= List of compositions by Carl Nielsen =

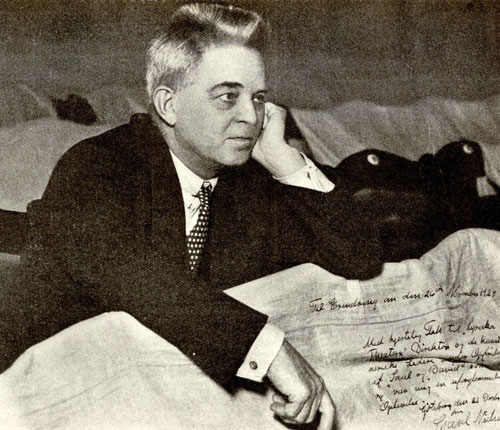
Carl Nielsen

This table of works by the Danish composer Carl Nielsen initially lists them by genre and composition date within a genre.

== History ==
Nielsen wrote music in many genres, notably symphonies, concertos and choral music, but also operas and incidental music, chamber music, solo works for violin, piano and organ as well as a considerable number of songs.

Nielsen assigned an opus number only to selected compositions, from Op 1 for the Suite for String Orchestra in 1888 to Op 58 for the organ work Commotio (1930–1931). The opus number 59 was assigned posthumously to three piano pieces Tre Klaverstykker (1928).

The FS catalogue was first compiled in 1965 by Dan Fog and Torben Schousboe. It is arranged roughly in chronological order in accordance with the publication date of the works, initially up to FS 161. Compositions discovered after 1965 were assigned higher numbers, in connection with the publication of a Nielsen CD in 1998.

The CNW (Catalogue of Carl Nielsen's Works), compiled by the Royal Danish Library, covers all of Nielsen's known works (419 in all). The CNW catalogue numbers link to the individual catalogue entries. Each entry gives a brief description of the work in English together with links to background information and scores from the Carl Nielsen Edition. In contrast to FS, CNW numbers each of Nielsen's songs individually instead of numbering the publications in which they appeared.

== Table of compositions ==
Works by Carl Nielsen
Title	Translation	Key	FS	Op.	Time	Genre	Text	CNW
Symphony No. 1		G minor	16	7	1892–1894	symphony		25
Symphony No. 2 De fire Temperamenter	The Four Temperaments		29	16	1901–1902	symphony		26
Symphony No. 3 Sinfonia espansiva			60	27	1910–1911	symphony		27
Symphony No. 4 Det Uudslukkelige	The Inextinguishable		76	29	1914–1916	symphony		28
Symphony No. 5			97	50	1921–1922	symphony		29
Symphony No. 6 Sinfonia semplice	Simple Symphony		116		1924–1925	symphony		30
Violin Concerto			61	33	1911	concerto		41
Flute Concerto			119		1926	concerto		42
Clarinet Concerto			129	57	1928	concerto		43
Saul og David	Saul and David		25		1898–1901	opera in four acts	E. Christiansen; after Books of Samuel	1
Maskarade	Masquerade		39		1904–1906	comic opera in three acts	V. Andersen; after the play by Holberg	2
En Aften paa Giske	An Evening at Giske		9		1889	incidental overture	A. Munch	3
Snefrid			17		1883, revised and expanded 1899	incidental	H. Drachmann	4
Atalanta			30		1901	incidental song	G. Wied; J. Petersen (Note: Jens Petersen (1856–1902).)	6
Hr. Oluf han rider	Sir Oluf Rides		37		1906	incidental	H. Drachmann	7
Tove			43		1906–1908	incidental	L. Holstein	10, Coll. 6
Willemoes			44		1907–1908	incidental	L. C. Nielsen	8, Coll. 7
Forældre	Parents		45		1908	incidental piano piece	O. Benzon	9
Ulvens Søn	The Wolf's Son		50		1909	incidental two songs	J. Aakjær	11
Hagbarth og Signe	Hagbarth and Signe		57		1910	incidental	A. Oehlenschlæger	12
Sankt Hansaftenspil	Midsummer Eve Play		65		1913	incidental	A. Oehlenschlæger	13
Fædreland	Native Land		71		1915	incidental song and chorus	E. Christiansen	14
Prologue to the Shakespeare Celebrations			80		1916	incidental	H. Rode	15
Løgneren	The Liar		88		1918	incidental song	J. Sigurjónsson	16
Aladdin			89	34	1918–1919	incidental	A. Oehlenschlæger	17, Coll. 13
Moderen	The Mother		94	41	1920	incidental	H. Rode	18
Cosmus			98		1921–1922	incidental two songs	E. Christiansen	19
Hyldest til Holberg	Homage to Holberg		102		1922	incidental	H. H. Seedorff Pedersen	20
Ebbe Skammelsen			117		1925	incidental	H. Bergstedt	21
Amor og Digteren	Cupid and the Poet		150	54	1930	incidental	S. Michaëlis	23
Paaskeaftensspil	Easter Evening Play		156		1931	incidental	N. F. S. Grundtvig	24
Andante tranquillo e Scherzo					1887	orchestral orchestration of movements from FS 3 (a–i, k–t, v)		31
Suite for String Orchestra			6	1	1888	orchestral		32
Symfonisk Rhapsodi	Symphonic Rhapsody		7		1888	orchestral		33
Helios Overture			32	17	1903	orchestral		34
Saga-Drøm	Saga Dream	C minor/major	46	39	1907–1908	orchestral overture		35
Marseillaise (Rouget de Lisle)			403		1909	orchestral orchestration of FS 403		B 2
Ved en ung Kunstners Baare	At the Bier of a Young Artist		58		1910	orchestral string orchestra, for the funeral of Oluf Hartmann		36
Nærmere Gud til dig	Nearer my God to Thee		63		1912	orchestral paraphrase for wind instruments		37
Pan og Syrinx	Pan and Syrinx		87	49	1918	orchestral		38
En Fantasirejse til Færøerne	An Imaginary Journey to the Faroe Islands		123		1927	orchestral rhapsodic overture		39
Bøhmisk-dansk Folketone	Bohemian-Danish Folk Songs		130		1928	orchestral paraphrase for string orchestra		40
Musik til fem Digte af J. P. Jacobsen	Music to Five Poems by J. P. Jacobsen		12	4	1891	vocal voice and piano		Coll. 1
Unpublished miscellaneous songs			13		1891	vocal voice and piano		285, 286, 287
Viser og Vers af J. P. Jacobsen	Songs and Verses by J. P. Jacobsen		14	6	1891	vocal voice and piano		Coll.2
German edition of selected songs from FS 12 & 14			15		1891	vocal voice and piano		Coll. 3
Six Songs to Texts by Ludvig Holstein; 1. "Du fine, hvide Æbleblomst" * 2. "Erindringens Sø" * 3. "Sommersang" * 4. "Sang bag Ploven" * 5. "I Aften" * 6. "Hilsen"	1. "You fine white apple blossom"; 2. "The Lake of Memories"; 3. "Summer Song"; 4. "Song Behind the Plow"; 5. "This Evening"; 6. "Greetings"		18	10	1895–1896	vocal voice and piano	L. Holstein	Coll. 4
Hymnus amoris	Hymn of Love		21	12	1897	vocal for soloists, choir and orchestra		100
Kom Blankeste Sol	Come, glistening sun		28		1901	vocal choral	A. Thura	374
Edderkoppens Sang	The Spider's Song		27		1899	vocal choral	A. Oehlenschlæger	373
Kantate til Lorenz Frølich-Festen	Cantata for the Lorenz Frølich Celebration		26		1900	vocal	A. Olrik	103
Kantate ved Studentersamfundets Bygnings Indvielse			31		1901	vocal	H. Drachmann	104
Søvnen	Sleep		33	18	1904	vocal for chorus and orchestra		101
Du danske Mand	Thou Danish Man		35		1906	vocal song	H. Drachmann	288
"Jeg synes om din lette Gang"	I truly like your easy gait		38		1906	vocal voice and piano		289
"Sidskensang"	The Song of the Siskin		40		1907	vocal unaccompanied choir	E. Aarestrup	348
"Kom Gudsengel, stille Død!"	Come Angel of God, Tranquil Death!		41		1907	vocal unaccompanied choir	E. Aarestrup	350
Strofiske Sange	Strophic Songs		42	21	1905–1907	vocal voice and piano		Coll. 5
Kantate ved Universitetets Aarsfest	Cantata for the Annual University Commenoration		47	24	1908	vocal	N. Møller	105
"Aftenstemning"	Evening Mood		48		1908	vocal unaccompanied choir	M. Claudius; C. Hauch	359
Kantate til Mindefesten i Anledning af 250-Aarsdagen for Stormen paa København	Cantata for the Commemoration of 11 February 1659, for the 250th anniversary of the storming of Copenhagen		49		1909	vocal	L. C. Nielsen	106
Enstemmige Sange til Brug for Højskoler, Gymnastik og Skytteforeninger	Songs arranged for unison chorus to be use at schools		51		1908	vocal		Coll. 27
"De Unges Sang"	Song of the Young		52		1909	vocal song	J. C. Hostrup	291
"Til Snapsen i 'Bel Canto'"	To the Schnapps in 'Bel Canto'		53		1909	vocal song	A. Berntsen	360
Aarhus Landsudstillings Aabnings-Højtidelighed 1909	Cantata for the National Exhibition of 1909 in Aarhus		54		1909	vocal	L. C. Nielsen; (composed with Emilius Bangert)	107, Coll. 8
"Afholdssang"	Temperance Song		55		1909	vocal song with piano	J. Moldberg-Kjeldsen (Note: Jens Moldberg-Kjeldsen (1878–?).)	290
Cantata for the Commemoration of P.S. Krøyer			56		1909	vocal	L. C. Nielsen	108
"Paaske-Liljen"	"The Daffodil"		59		1910	vocal for unaccompanied choir	N. F. S. Grundtvig	361
"Børnehjælpdagens Sang"	Song for the Children's Relief Day		62		1911	vocal choral	Johannes Jørgensen	293
"Ungdomssang"	Youth Song		66		1913	vocal	Johannes Jørgensen	294
Ak, Julesne fra Bethlehem	Oh, Christmas Snow From Bethlehem		67		1914	vocal soprano and male chorus	Johannes Jørgensen	362
Fredlys din Jord, du danske Mand!	"Protect Your Soil, Each Danish Man!"		69		1914	vocal male chorus	A. W. Holm (Note: Anders Wilhelm Holm (1878–1959).)	295
En Snes danske Viser	A Score of Danish Songs (Volume I Songs), collaboration with T. Laub		70		1913–1915	vocal songs		Coll. 9
"Barnets Sang/ Børnehjælpdagens Sang"	"Children's Song"		72		1915	vocal		301
"Hil dig, vor Fane!"	"Hail to Thee, Our Banner!"		73		1915	vocal patriotic song for male voices	N. F. S. Grundtvig	363
"In Memoriam Franz Neruda"	Franz Neruda in Memoriam		74		1915	vocal for reciter and orchestra	J. Clausen	109
Melodier til Borups Dansk Sangbog I	Songs, texts by contemporary authors		75		1915	vocal		Coll. 12
Three pieces for Langeleg			77		1918	vocal		71
En Snes danske Viser	A Score of Danish Songs (Volume II Songs), collaboration with T. Laub		78		1914–1917	vocal songs		Coll.11
"Studie efter Naturen"	Study on Nature		82		1916	vocal song	H. C. Andersen	303
Salmer og Aandelige Sange	Hymns and Sacred Songs		83		1912–1916	vocal		Coll. 10
"Blomstervise"	Flower Song		84		1917	vocal song	L. Holstein	305
Hymne til Mindefester paa Niels W. Gades 100-Aarsdag	Hymn for Niels W. Gade's Centenary		85		1917	vocal choral	P. Richardt	110
Kantate ved Grosserer-Societetets Hundredsaarsfest	Cantata for the Centenary of the Chamber of Commerce		86	31	1917	vocal	V. Rørdam	111
Christianshavn			90		1918	vocal song	O. Bauditz (Note: Ove Bauditz (1871–1936).)	306
Two Spiritual Songs; "Den store Mester kommer"; "Udrundne er de gamle Dage"	The Greatest Master Cometh; Gone are the days		92		1917–1918	vocal song		Coll. 14
"Gry"	Dawn		93		1919–1920	vocal song	H. Lorenzen (Note: Hansigne Lorenzen (1870–1952).)	308
Tyve folkelige Melodier	Twenty Folk Melodies		95		1917–1921	vocal songs	various	Coll. 15
"Sof sott, du lilla Sonja"	To My Little Friend Sonja [Helleberg]		99		1922	vocal song	C. Nielsen	309
Fynsk Foraar	Springtime on Funen		96	42	1921	vocal for soloists, choir and orchestra	A. Berntsen	102
Fire folkelige Melodier	Four Folk Melodies		101		1922	vocal songs		Coll. 16
Folkehøjskolens Melodibog	Songbook for the Folk High School		103		1922	vocal songs	various	Coll. 17, Coll. 18
"Sang for 'Dansk Arbejde"	Song for "Danish Labour"		105		1923	vocal song	V. Rørdam	310
"Himlen mørkner stor og stum"	The Heavens darken, vast and silent		106		1923	vocal Christmas song	M. Falck	313
"Kom jul til Jord"	"Come Yule to Earth"		107		1923	vocal Christmas song	J. Wiberg (Note: Johannes Wiberg (1894–?).)	312
"Hjemlige Jul"	"Christmas at Home"		108		1923	vocal Christmas song	E. Bønnelycke	314
"Balladen om Bjørnen"	"Ballad of the Bear"		109	47	1923	vocal voice and piano	A. Berntsen	315
"Der er et yndigt land"	"A fair and lovely land"		110		1924	vocal for unaccompanied choir	A. Oehlenschlæger	351
Sangbogen Danmark	A Danish Songbook for School and Home		111		1924	vocal	various	Coll. 19
"Det vi ved, at siden Slangens Gift"			112		1923–1924	vocal	J. C. Hostrup	316
"Hymne til Livet"	"Hymn to Life"		113		1923–1924	vocal choral	S. Michaëlis	376
Ti danske Smaasange	Ten Little Danish Songs		114		1923–1924	vocal		Coll. 20
Fire jydske sange	Four Jutlandish Songs		115		1923–1924	vocal	A. Berntsen	272, 273, 274, 275
"Foraarssang (Vaaren)"	"Spring Song"		118		1926	vocal choral	M. Børup	353
Nye Melodier til Borups Sangbog II	New Melodies for Johan Borup's Song Book		120		1926	vocal songs	various	Coll. 21
"Det är Höst"	"It is Autumn"		121		1929	vocal song	A. Rogberg (Note: Alma Rogberg (1870?–1939).)	335
"Dansk Vejr"	"Danish Weather"		122		1926–1927	vocal song	Ove Rode	325
Vocalise-Etude			124		1927	vocal soprano and piano	Ove Rode	317
Tillæg til Folkehøjskolens Melodibog	Supplement to the People's High School Songbook		125		1927	vocal songs	various	Coll. 22, Coll. 23
"Den trænger, ud til hvert et Sted"	It's spreading everywhere with us		126		1927	vocal song	J. C. Hostrup	326
"Guldfloden"	"The Golden River"		127		1927	vocal song	B. S. Ingemann	329
"Velkommen Lærkelil"	"Welcome Little Lark"		133		1928	vocal song	C. Richardt	408
"Island"	"Iceland"		134		1929	vocal for reciter and orchestra	Otto Lagoni (Note: Otto Lagoni (1882–1949).)	338
To Skolesange	Two School Songs		138		1929	vocal for unaccompanied choir	V. Stuckenberg	Coll. 25
Tre Motetter; * Afflictus sum (Psalm 38:9); * Dominus regit me (Psalm 23:1-2); * Benedictus Dominus (Psalm 31:22)	Three Motets		139	55	1929	vocal	Psalm verses selected by Carl Nielsen and Anne Marie Carl-Nielsen	Coll. 24
Kantate ved Polyteknisk Læreanstalts 100 Aars Jubilæum	Cantata for the Centenary of the Polytechnic High School		140		1929	vocal	H. H. Seedorff Pedersen	112
"Hymne til Kunsten"	"Hymn to Art"		141		1929	vocal choral	S. Michaëlis	113
"Hjemstavn"	"Homecoming"		142		1929	voca song	F. Poulsen	332
"Der gaar et stille Tog"	A Silent File will Reach		143		1929	vocal song	Bjørnstjerne Bjørnson	333
"Til min Fødeø"	"To My Native Island"		144		1929	vocal for unaccompanied choir	S. P. Raben-Korch (Note: S. P. Raben-Korch (1869–1957).)	364
"Fremtidens Land"	"Country to Come"		145		1929	vocal song	Bjørnstjerne Bjørnson	334
"Danmark nu blunder den lyse Nat"	"Denmark, Now Sleeps the Clear Night"		146		1929	vocal song	T. Larsen	336
"Vi Jyder"	"We of Jutland"		147		1929	vocal song to the play	V. F. Bartrumsen (Note: Vilhelm From Bartrumsen (1881–1967).)	22, 330
Sang for femstemmigt blandet Kor ved Dansk Ligbrændingsforenings Jubilæum den 23de marts 1931	Chorus for the 50th Anniversary of the Danish Cremation Union		149		1931	vocal	S. Michaëlis	354
"Gensyn"	"Retrospect"		151		1930	vocal song	F. Paludan-Müller	337
Six Canons (For Use in Schools and Training Colleges)			152		1930	vocal song	various	Coll. 26
Kantate ved Foreningen til unge Handelsmænds Uddannelses 50-Aars Jubilæum	Cantata for the 50th Anniversary of the Young Merchants' Education Association		153		1930	vocal	H. H. Seedorff Pedersen	114
"Sjølunds Sangere"	"The Singers of Sjølund"		154		1930	vocal choral	K. Elnegaard (Note: Karl Elnegaard (1871–1951).)	352
"Kvadet om Nordens Harpe"	"Lay of the Nordic Harp"		158		1931	vocal for male voice chorus	A. Berntsen	365
"Græshoppen sidder paa Engen"	Grasshopper sits in the meadow		161		1899	vocal choral	B. S. Ingemann	372
Digtning i Sang og Toner ved Svømmehallens Indvielse	Cantata for the Opening of the Swimming Baths		302		1930	vocal	H. H. Seedorff Pedersen	115
Cantata for the Inauguration of the Radium Station (Not by Nielsen; Arrangement by Valdemar Rørdam using two of Nielsen's songs: CNW 359 and 361)			303		1931	vocal	V. Rørdam	
"Morten Børups Majvise"	"Morten Børup's May Song"		305		1906	vocal female chorus SSA	M. Børup	375
Jephta (Arrangement of the Oratorio by Carissimi)			404		1922	vocal		B 1
Orchestration of Schubert's "Prometheus"			405		1923–1924	vocal		B 5
Kvartet for to violiner, bratsch og cello	String Quartet	D minor	3d		1882–1883	chamber		49
Various movements for string quartet			3c		1883–1887	chamber		52, 53, 54
String Quartet		F major	3k		1887	chamber		50, 51
String Quartet No. 1		G minor	4	13	1887–1888, revised 1900	chamber		55
String Quartet No. 2		F minor	11	5	1890	chamber		56
Sonate nr. 1 for violin og klaver	Sonata No. 1 for Violin and Piano	A major	20	9	1895	chamber		63
String Quartet No. 3		E♭ major	23	14	1897–1898	chamber		57
String Quartet No. 4 "Piacevolezza"		F major	36	44	1906, revised 1919	chamber		58
Sonata for violin and piano			64	35	1912	chamber		64
Sonata for violin and piano		G major	3b		1881	chamber		62
Duet for violins			3e		1880–1883	chamber		48
Various brass trios and quartets (not extant)			3a		1879–1883	chamber		412
Piano Trio		G major	3i		1883	chamber		68
String Quintet		G major	5		1888	chamber		59
Fantasistykker for obo og klaver	Fantasy Pieces for Oboe and Piano		8	2	1889	chamber		65
Fantasistykke for klarinet og klaver	Fantasy Piece for Clarinet and Piano		3h		1880	chamber		66
Ved en ung kunstners baare	At the Bier of a Young Artist				1910	chamber for string quintet		36
Serenata in vano			68		1914	chamber for clarinet, bassoon, horn, cello and double-bass		69
Wind Quintet			100	43	1922	chamber for flute, oboe (cor anglais), clarinet, horn and bassoon		70
Canto serioso			132		1913	chamber for French horn (or cello) and piano		67
Allegretto			157		1931	chamber Allegretto for two recorders		72
Romance		G major	304		1882–1883	chamber for violin and piano		60
Romance		D major				chamber for violin and piano		61
Polka		A major	1		1874	violin		44
Præludium og tema med variationer	Prelude and Theme with Variations		104	48	1923	violin		46
Grüss					1890	violin		45
Preludio e Presto			128	52	1927–1928	violin		47
Skomagerens Brudevals	Cobbler's Wedding Waltz		2		1878 (dubious)	piano		App. D
To karakterstykker for klaver	Two Character Pieces		3f		1882–1883	piano		73
Fem klaverstykker	Five Piano Pieces: 1. Folk Tune; 2. Humoresque; 3. Arabesque; 4. Mignon; 5. Elf-Dance		10	3	1890	piano		81
Symphonisk suite	Symphonic Suite		19	8	1894	piano		82
Humoreske Bagateller	Humoresque Bagatelles		22	11	1894–1897	piano		83
Fest-præludium ved Aarhundredskiftet	Festive Prelude for the New Century		24		1899	piano		84
Drømmen om "Glade Jul"	Dream about "Silent Night"		34		1905	piano		85
Chaconne			79	32	1916	piano		86
Thema med variationer	Theme with Variations		81	40	1917	piano		87
Piano Suite Den Luciferiske	The Luciferan		91	45	1919–1920	piano		88
Tre Klaverstykker	Three piano pieces		131	59 posth.	1928	piano		90
Klavermusik for Smaa og Store 2 volumes	Piano Music for Young and Old		148	53	1930	piano		92
Piano Piece in C			159		1931	piano		95
Norsk folkedans	Norwegian Folk Dance				1880–1890	piano		74
Andante					1884–1886	piano		75
Klavierstück	Piano Piece				1888–1891	piano		76
Bondedans (Polka)	Peasant Dance (Polka)				1896–1897	piano		77
Allegretto						piano		78
PIano Piece						piano		79
Menuet	Minuet					piano		80
Andantino						piano		91
29 smaa Praeludier	29 small preludes		136	51	1929	organ		96
To præludier	Two Preludes		137		1930	organ		98
Commotio			155	58	1930–1931	organ		99

== Details of collections ==
For some works, details are given below. The details of songs, such as collections and incidental music, are found in the List of songs composed by Carl Nielsen.

=== FS 3 ===
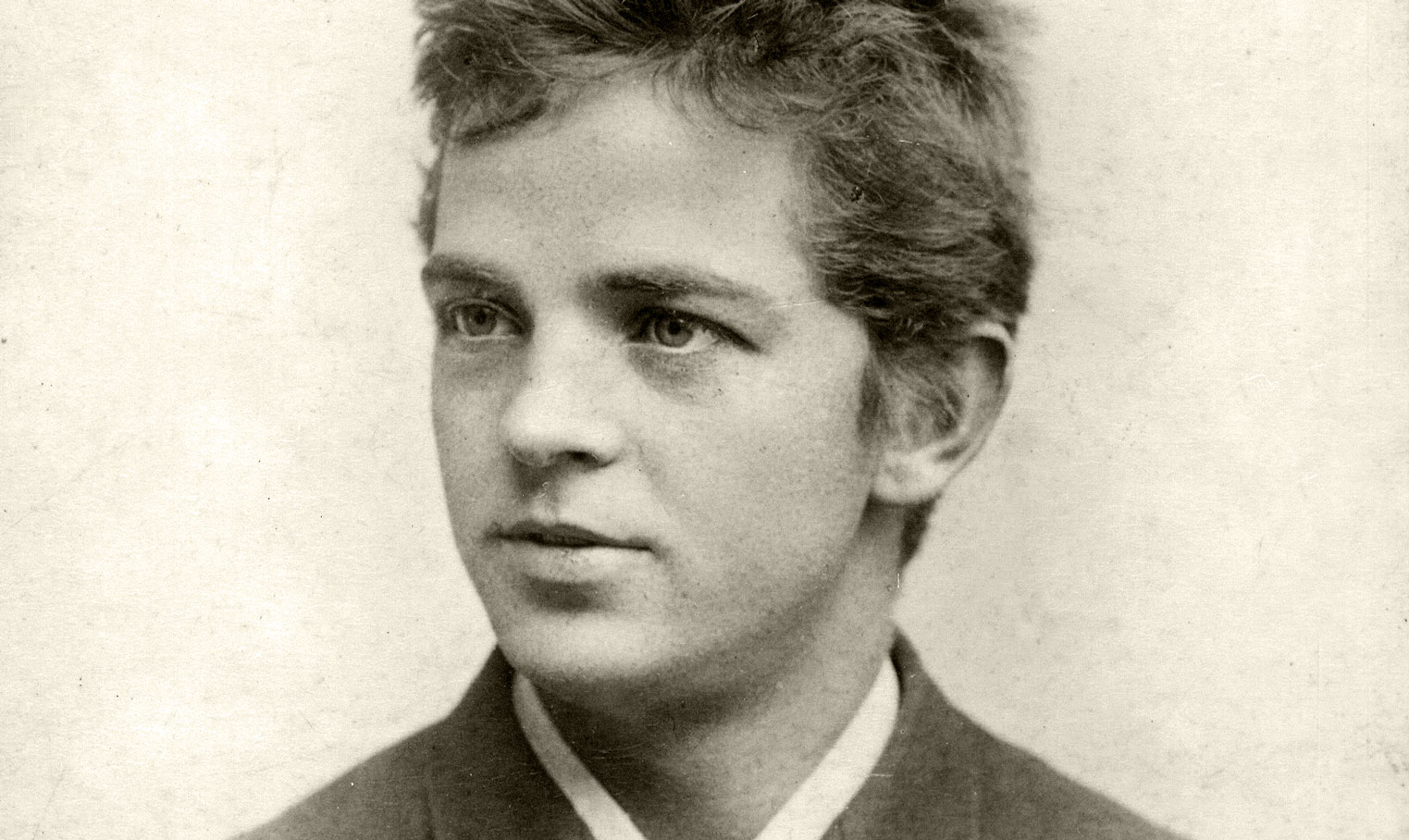
Nielsen in 1884

Miscellaneous unpublished early manuscripts in the Royal Library, Copenhagen

- 3a Various brass trios and quartets (1879–1983, lost)
- 3b Sonata No. 1 for violin and piano in G major (1881–1882)
- 3c Various movements for string quartet (1883–1887)
- 3d String Quartet in D minor (1882–1883).
- 3e Duo (in three movements) in A major for two violins (1882–1883).
- 3f Caractaerstykker (Two character pieces) for piano (1882–1883)
- 3g Vuggevise (Lullaby) (1883)
- 3h Fantasy Piece for clarinet and piano in G minor (1881 or 1883–1885)
- 3i Piano Trio in G major (1883)
- 3k String Quartet in F major (1887)
- 3l "Det bødes der for i lange Aar" (A moment of pleasure, an age of pain), song for men's choir, text by J. P. Jacobsen (1887)
- 3m "Længsel (I hvor jeg end slaaer Øjet hen)" (Jean (Of a' the airts the wind can blaw), song for men's choir, text by Robert Burns; translated by Caralis (1887)
- 3n-s Various songs on texts by E. Aarestrup, J. S. Welhaven, G. B. Byron, P. B. Shelley, J. J. Callanan, R. Burns; translated by Caralis, a pseudonym for C. Preetzman (1887)
- 3t "Byd mig at leve" (To Athenea, who may command him anything), song for men's choir, text by Robert Herrick; translated by Caralis (1887)
- 3u "For drømte jeg fast hver eneste Nat" (Earlier I dreamt every single night), song for men's choir, text by J. P. Jacobsen (1887)

=== FS 22 ===
Humoreske Bagateller. For piano. (1894–1897)

1. "Goddag, Goddag ("How do you do?")
2. "Sprællemanden ("The Jumping Jack")
3. "Snurretoppen ("The Spinning-top")
4. "En lille langsom Vals ("A Little Slow Waltz")
5. "Dukkemarche ("Doll's march")
6. "Spilleværket ("The Musical Box")

=== FS 51 ===
Songs arranged for unison chorus to be used at schools (FS 35, 42, 43, 44, 45, and Vi frie Folk, text by V. Rørdam, written for the Olympic Games in London, 1908)

== See also ==
- List of songs composed by Carl Nielsen

== Bibliography ==
Catalogues

- Foltmann, Niels Bo; et al. (2016). Catalogue of Carl Nielsen's Works. Copenhagen: Museum Tusculanum Press. ISBN 978-87-635-4405-4. Also online: "Catalogue of Carl Nielsen's Works". 2014..
- Jackson, Andrew (9 May 1999). "Chronological Catalogue of Compositions". Archived from the original on 6 November 2007. List compiled from Simpson (1979, pp. 251–257) and Lawson (1997, pp. 222–227).
- Lawson, Jack (1997). Carl Nielsen. London: Phaidon Press. ISBN 978-0-7148-3507-5. See pages 222–227, listed by genre with FS and opus numbers.
- Poroila, Heikki (2013). Unified Carl Nielsen: Teosten yhtenäistettyjen nimekkeiden ohjeluettelo [Unified Carl Nielsen: Works in the harmonized list of titles] (PDF) (in Finnish). Helsinki: Suomen musiikkikirjastoyhdistys [Finnish Music Library Association]. ISBN 978-952-5363-65-4. Listed by FS number.
- Simpson, Robert (1952). Carl Nielsen, Symphonist, 1865–1931 (1st ed.). London: J. M. Dent. ASIN B0000CIDKO. See pages 212–230, chronological list with opus numbers compiled by Torben Meyer. Reprinted by Hyperion Press ISBN 978-0-88355-715-0.
- Simpson, Robert (1979). Carl Nielsen, Symphonist (2nd ed.). London: Kahn & Averill. ISBN 978-0-900707-46-9. See pages 251–257, listed by FS number with opus numbers.

Other citations

- Hjordt-Vetlesen, Inger-Lise (2012). "Lorenzen, Hansigne". In Mai, Anne-Marie (ed.). Hansigne Lorenzen. The History of Nordic Women's Literature (Digital ed.). Copenhagen: KVINFO.
