= List of songs composed by Carl Nielsen =

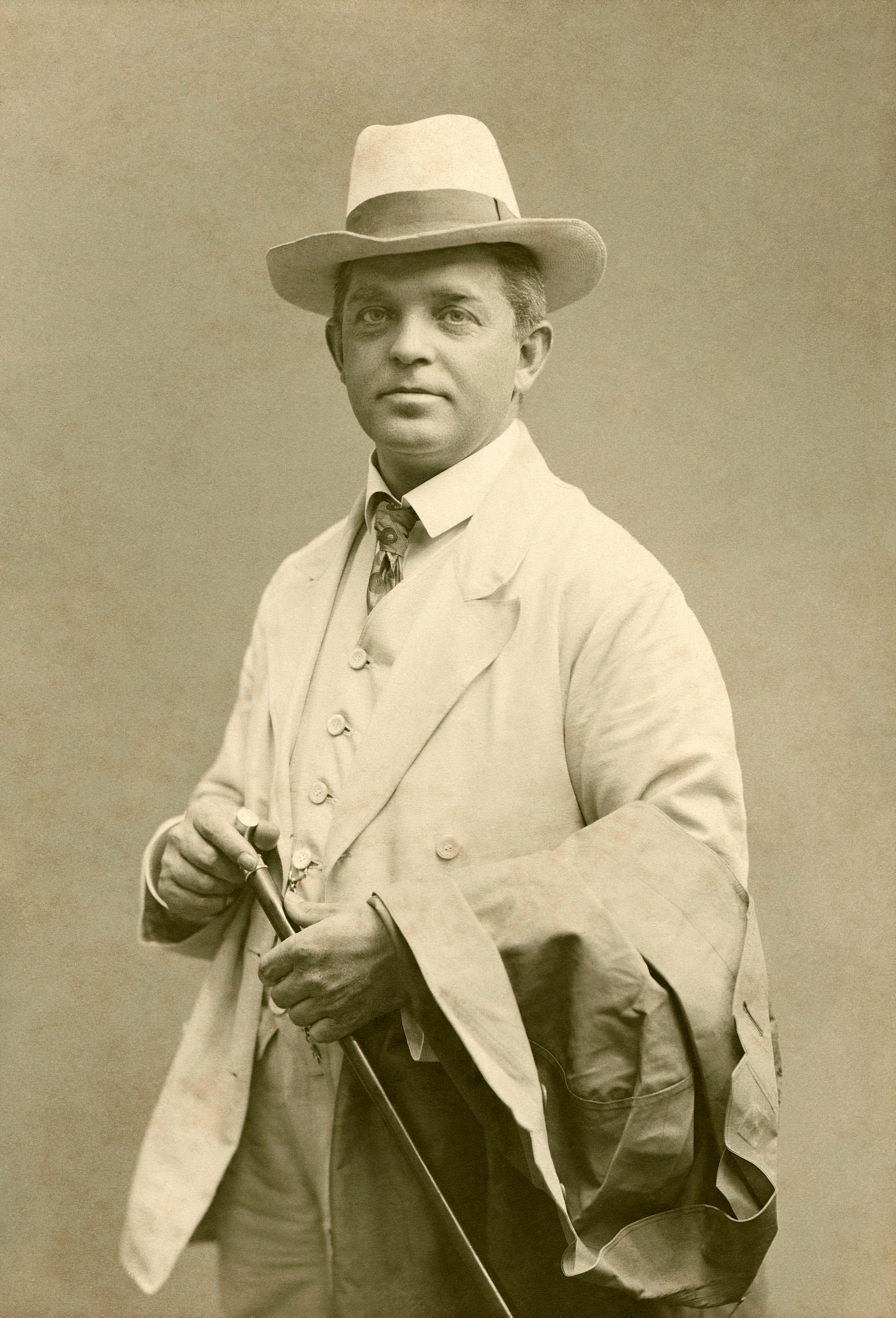
Carl Nielsen, c. 1908

This is a list of the songs and hymns composed by Carl Nielsen.

== Songs with piano ==
=== Solo voice and piano ===
FS 12 (Op. 4)

Musik til fem Digte af J. P. Jacobsen (Music to Five Poems by J. P. Jacobsen) for voice and piano (1891)

1. "Solnedgang" ("Sunset")
2. "I Seraillets Have" ("In the Harem Garden")
3. "Til Asali" ("To Asali")
4. "Irmelin" ("Irmelin")
5. "Har dagen sanket al sin Sorg" ("Has the Day Gathered All its Sorrow")

FS 13

Unpublished miscellaneous songs (1891)

1. "Aldrig hans Ord kan jeg glemme" (Paludan-Müller)
2. "I Drømmenes Land" (Jacobsen)
3. "Solnedgang" (Jacobsen)

FS 14 (Op. 6)

Viser og Vers af J. P. Jacobsen (Songs and Verses by J. P. Jacobsen) for voice and piano (1891)

1. "Genrebillede" ("Genre Piece")
2. "Seraferne" ("The Seraphs")
3. "Silkesko over gylden Læst" ("Silken Shoes on a Golden Last")
4. "Det bødes der for i lange Aar" ("A Moment of Pleasure, an Age of Pain")
5. "Vise af 'Mogens" ("Song from [the short story] 'Mogens'")

FS 18 (Op. 10). Seks Sange til Tekster af Ludvig Holstein (Six Songs on Texts by Ludvig Holstein) (1895–96)

1. Du fine, hvide Æbleblomst (You apple blossom fine and white)
2. Erindringens Sø (Lake of Memories)
3. Sommersang (Summer Song)
4. Sang bag Ploven (Song behind the Plough)
5. I Aften (Tonight)
6. Hilsen (Greeting)

FS 37. Hr. Oluf han rider (Sir Oluf Rides). Texts by Holger Drachmann (1906)

- I. Hellelidens Sang (Helleliden's Song)
- II. Hr. Olufs Sang (Sir Oluf's Song)
- III. Dansevise (Dancing Ballad)

FS 42 (Op. 21). Strofiske Sange (Strophic Songs) (1905–07)

- Volume 1
  - I. Skal Blomsterne da visne (Shall flowers, then, all wither?). Text by Helge Rode
  - II. Høgen (Hawk). Text by Jeppe Aakjær
  - III. Jens Vejmand (Jens the Roadman). Text by Jeppe Aakjær
- Volume 2
  - IV. Sænk kun dit Hoved du Blomst (Lay down, sweet flower, your head). Text by Johannes Jørgensen
  - V. Den første Lærke (The larks are coming). Text by Jeppe Aakjær
  - VI. Husvild (Vagrant). Text by Johannes Vilhelm Jensen
  - VII. Godnat (Good Night). Text by Johannes Vilhelm Jensen

FS 43

Tove. Incidental music for the play by Ludvig Holstein. (1906–1908) The Score is lost, only the following four songs have survived:

1. "Vi Sletternes Sønner" (We sons of the plains)
2. "Fuglefængervisen" (Bird-catcher's song)
3. "Toves Sang" (Tove's song)
4. "Jægersang" (Hunter's song)

FS 44

Willemoes. Incidental music, text by L.C. Nielsen (1907–1908). Four songs were published:

1. "Havet omkring Danmark" (The ocean around Denmark)
2. "Vibekes Sang" (Vibeke's song)
3. "Fædreland" (Fatherland)
4. "Ja tag os, vor Moder" (Yes, take us, our mother)

FS 50. To Sange fra Jeppe Aakjærs Skuespil "Ulvens Søn" (Two Songs for Jeppe Aakjær's Play "Ulven's Son") (1909)

- I. Gamle Anders Røgters Sang (Song of Old Anders the Cattleman)
- II. Kommer I snart, I Husmænd! (Now Is the Time, Smallholders!)

FS 70 & FS 78. En Snes danske Viser (A Score of Danish Songs). Collaboration with Thomas Laub; 23 songs by Nielsen, 21 by Laub. In two Volumes.

- Volume 1 (1913–15)
  - I. De Refsnæsdrenge, de Samsøpiger (The Boys of Refsnæs, the Girls of Samsø). Text by Steen Steensen Blicher
  - III. Ud gaar du nu paa Livets Vej (Now you must find your path in life). Text by Steen Steensen Blicher
  - IVa. I Skyggen vi vanke (In shadows we wander). Text by Adam Oehlenschläger
  - V. Underlige Aftenlufte! (Odd and unknown evening breezes!). Text by Adam Oehlenschläger
  - VII. Naar Odin vinker (As Odin beckons). Text by Adam Oehlenschläger
  - IX. Vender sig Lykken fra dig (Fortune has lately left you). Text by Carsten Hauch
  - XI. Vor Verden priser jeg tusindfold (Our earth I magnify thousandfold). Text by Poul Martin Møller
  - XII. Rosen blusser alt i Danas Have (Rose is blooming now in Dana's borders). Text by Poul Martin Møller
  - XIV. Sov ind mit søde Nusseben! (Sleep tight, my ducky little dear!). Text by Poul Martin Møller
  - XVI. Farvel, min velsignede Fødeby! (Farewell, my respectable native town!). Text by Poul Martin Møller
  - XIX. Jeg bærer med Smil min Byrde (I take with a smile my burden). Text by Jeppe Aakjær
  - XX. Nu er Dagen fuld af Sang (Now the day is full of song). Text by Jeppe Aakjær
- Volume 2 (1914–17)
  - XXVI. Nu er da Vaaren kommen (At last the spring's upon us). Text by Adam Oehlenschläger
  - XXVII. Hvor sødt i Sommer-Aftenstunden (How sweet, as summer day is fading). Text by Adam Oehlenschläger
  - XXVIII. Tidt er jeg glad, og vil dog gerne græde (Oft am I glad, still may I weep from sadness). Text by Bernhard Severin Ingemann
  - XXXIII. Min lille Fugl, hvor flyver du (My little bird, where do you fly). Text by Hans Christian Andersen
  - XXXIV. Hun mig har glemt! min Sorg hun ej see! (Forget she did! my woe is in vain!). Text by Hans Christian Andersen
  - XXXV. Højt ligger paa Marken den hvide Sne (Snow covers the field, oh so deep and white). Text by Hans Christian Andersen
  - XXXVIII. Nu springer Vaaren fra sin Seng (Now, spring is leaping out of bed). Text by Viggo Stuckenberg
  - XL. Se dig ud en Sommerdag (Look about one summer day). Text by Jeppe Aakjær
  - XLI. Der dukker af Disen min Fædrenejord (There out of the fog looms my ancestors' land). Text by Jeppe Aakjær
  - XLII. Hør, hvor let dens Vinger smækker (Listen, how its pinions scuttle). Text by Jeppe Aakjær
  - XLIV. Der boede en Mand i Ribe By (There once lived a man in Ribe town). Traditional

FS 83. Salmer og Aandelige Sange, halvhundred nye Melodier for Hjem, Kirke og Skole (Hymns and Sacred Songs, Fifty New Melodies for Home, Church and School) (1912-1916)

- I. Ak, min Rose visner bort (Ah, my rose will fade away). Text by Hans Adolph Brorson
- II. Alt paa den vilde Hede (On moorland barren, level). Text by Nikolai Frederik Severin Grundtvig
- III. Denne er Dagen, som Herren har gjort! (This is the day that the Lord did create!). Text by Nikolai Frederik Severin Grundtvig
- IV. Den store, hvide Flok vi se (The great, white fl ock begins to show). Text by Hans Adolph Brorson
- V. Der er en Bøn paa Jorden (There is an earthly prayer). Text by Nikolai Frederik Severin Grundtvig
- VI. Der er en Vej, som Verden ikke kender (There is a way from mortals hid forever). Text by Nikolai Frederik Severin Grundtvig
- VII. Det er et Under paa Verdens Ø (A wondrous isle is the world, indeed). Text by Nikolai Frederik Severin Grundtvig
- VIII. Det koster ej for megen Strid (The strain is not too great). Text by Hans Adolph Brorson
- IX. Dig vil jeg elske, du min Styrke (Yea, I shall love Thee, Thou my vigour). Text by Hans Egede Glahn
- X. Drag, Jesus, mig (Oh Jesus, show me). Text by Hans Adolph Brorson
- XI. Dybt hælder Aaret i sin Gang (Well on the wane the passing year). Text by C.J. Boye
- XII. Et helligt Liv, en salig Død (A holy life, a blessed death). Text by Nikolai Frederik Severin Grundtvig
- XIII. Forunderligt at sige (How wonderful to ponder). Text by Nikolai Frederik Severin Grundtvig
- XIV. Fred med dig! og Fred med eder! (Peace with you! And with each being!). Text by Nikolai Frederik Severin Grundtvig
- XV. Fred og Glæde, for dem græde (Peace and pleasure). Text by Nikolai Frederik Severin Grundtvig
- XVI. Frisk op! endnu en Gang (Refresh yourself in song). Text by Hans Adolph Brorson
- XVII. Glæden hun er født i Dag (Happiness is born today). Text by Thomas Kingo
- XVIII. Guds Engle i Flok! (God's angels, unite!). Text by Nikolai Frederik Severin Grundtvig
- XIX. Guds Fred er mer end Englevagt (God's peace is more than angel guard). Text by Nikolai Frederik Severin Grundtvig
- XX. Gud skal al Ting mage (God, the great creator). Text by Hans Adolph Brorson
- XXI. Har Haand du lagt paa Herrens Plov (When you take up the Master's plough). Text by Nikolai Frederik Severin Grundtvig
- XXII. Har nogen Lyst at kende (You want to know the seasons). Text by Nikolai Frederik Severin Grundtvig
- XXIII. Herren siger: Er I trætte (Are you tired, says the Master). Text by Nikolai Frederik Severin Grundtvig
- XXIV. Herrens Røst var over Vandet! (Voice of God above the ocean!). Text by Nikolai Frederik Severin Grundtvig
- XXV. Hvi vil du dig saá klage (Why do you wail, complaining). Text by Nikolai Frederik Severin Grundtvig
- XXVI. Jeg fandt en Trøst (I found support). Text by Vilhelm Birkedal
- XXVII. Jeg raaber fast, o Herre (I call out loud, oh Master). Text by Steen Bille
- XXVIII. Jeg ved et lille Himmerig (I know a little paradise). Text by Nikolai Frederik Severin Grundtvig
- XXIX. Korsets Tegn og Korsets Ord (Sign and word of cross a shock). Text by Nikolai Frederik Severin Grundtvig
- XXX. Luk Øjne op, al Kristenhed! (Lift up your eyes, all Christian men!). Text by Nikolai Frederik Severin Grundtvig
- XXXI. Maria sad paa Hø og Straa (The Virgin Mary sat in hay). Text by Nikolai Frederik Severin Grundtvig
- XXXII. Min Jesus, lad mit Hjerte faa (My Jesus, let my heart obtain). Text by Nikolai Frederik Severin Grundtvig
- XXXIII. Naar jeg betænker Tid og Stund (As I consider time and day). Text by Niels-Henning Ørsted Pedersen
- XXXIV. Nu Sol i Øst oprinder mild (Now the sun arises in the East). Text by Carl Joakim Brandt
- XXXV. O, havde jeg dog tusind Tunger (A thousand tongues my pure desire). Text by Hans Adolph Brorson
- XXXVI. O Helligaand! mit Hjerte (Oh Holy Ghost, my passion). Text by Hans Adolph Brorson
- XXXVII. O hør os, Herre, for din Død (Oh hear us, Master, for your death). Text by Nikolai Frederik Severin Grundtvig
- XXXVIII. O Kristelighed! (Christianity, lo!). Text by Nikolai Frederik Severin Grundtvig
- XXXIX. Op al den Ting, som Gud har gjort (Rise, all that God created here). Text by Hans Adolph Brorson
- XL. Op, I Kristne, ruster eder! (Rise, ye Christians, and get ready!). Text by Hans Adolph Brorson
- XLI. O, sad jeg, som Maria sad (Oh if I sat as Mary sat). Text by Marie Wexelsen
- XLII. Paa alle dine Veje (Where'er your path may take you). Text by Nikolai Frederik Severin Grundtvig
- XLIII. Som den gyldne Sol frembryder (As the golden sun emerges). Text by Thomas Kingo
- XLIV. Ton det, Himmel, syng det, Jord (Sound it, heaven, sing it, earth). Text by Nikolai Frederik Severin Grundtvig
- XLV. Uforsagt, hvordan min Lykke (Unafraid whate'er my chances). Text by Ambrosius Stub
- XLVI. Under Korset stod med Smerte ('Neath the Cross of the departed). Text by Nikolai Frederik Severin Grundtvig
- XLVII. Utallige Blomster paa Jorderig gro (Though countless the flowers that grow on the earth). Text by Nikolai Frederik Severin Grundtvig
- XLVIII. Verdens Børn har mangt et Sted (Worldlings have so many sites). Text by Nikolai Frederik Severin Grundtvig
- XLIX. Vor Herre, han er en Konge stor (The Lord is a king, immensely great). Text by Nikolai Frederik Severin Grundtvig

FS 86 (Op. 31). To Sange fra Valdemar Rørdams "Kantate ved Grosserer-Societetets Hundredaarsfest" (Two Songs from Valdemar Rørdam's "Cantata for the Centenary of the Chamber of Commerce") (1917)

- I. Købmands-Vise (Merchant Song)
- II. Hymne til Danmark (Hymn to Denmark)

FS 89 (Op. 34). Tre Sange fra Adam Oehlenschlägers Skuespil "Aladdin eller den forunderlige Lampe" (Three Songs from Adam Oehlenschläger's Play "Aladdin and the Wonderful Lamp") (1918–19)

- I. Cithar! Lad min Bøn dig røre (Zither! Touched by this my prayer)
- II. Visselulle nu, Barnlil! (Hushaby now, baby li'l!)
- III. Alt Maanen oprejst staar bag sorte Skove (Beyond black woods the moon)

FS 92. To aandelige Sange (Two Spiritual Songs) (1917–18)

- I. Den store Mester kommer (The greatest master cometh). Text by Bernhard Severin Ingemann
- II. Udrundne er de gamle Dage (Gone are the days, they're past and olden). Text by Nikolai Frederik Severin Grundtvig

FS 94 (Op. 41). Otte Sange fra Helge Rodes Skuespil "Moderen" (Eight Songs from Helge Rode's Play "The Mother") (1920)

- I. Vildt gaar Storm mod sorte Vande (Wild the storm on blackened waters)
- II. Min pige er saa lys som Rav (Like golden amber is my girl)
- III. Dengang Ørnen var flyveklar (When the Eagle would fly to rule)
- IV. Ved Festen fik en Moder Bud (A mother at the feast was told)
- V. Tidselhøsten tegner godt (Thistle crop looks promising)
- VI. Saa bittert var mit Hjerte (My heart was truly bitter)
- VII. Dengang Døden var i Vente (Testament, as he was dying)
- VIII. Som en rejselysten Flaade (There's a fleet of floating islands)

FS 95. Tyve folkelige Melodier (Twenty Folklike Melodies) (1917–21)

- I. På det jævne, på det jævne! (Simple-rooted, simple-rooted!). Text by Hans Vilhelm Kaalund
- II. Derfor kan vort øje glædes (Wherefore do our eyes feel pleasure). Text by Christian Richardt
- III. Jeg så kun tilbage (I only looked back). Text by Bernhard Severin Ingemann
- IV. Morgendug der, sagte bæver (Morning dew that slightly trembles). Text by Carsten Hauch
- V. Jord, i hvis favn (Earth, whose embrace). Text by Christian Richardt
- VI. Den store Mester kommer! (The greatest master cometh!). Text by Bernhard Severin Ingemann
- VII. Der sad en fisker så tankefuld (There sat a fisherman deep in thought). Text by Nikolai Frederik Severin Grundtvig
- VIII. St. St. Blicher (Steen Steensen Blicher). Text by Carl Ploug
- IX. Dér, hvor vi stred og sang (Where we would fight and sing). Text by Jens Christian Hostrup
- X. Når Somrens sang er sungen (When summer song is finished). Text by Jens Christian Hostrup
- XI. De snækker mødtes i kvæld på hav (The barques would meet on a sunset wave). Text by Nikolai Frederik Severin Grundtvig
- XII. Naturens ædle dyrker (The noble nature student). Text by Carsten Hauch
- XIII. Tunge, mørke natteskyer (Heavy, gloomy clouds of night). Text by Jakob Knudsen
- XIV. Som dybest Brønd gir altid klarest Vand (Like purest waters rise from deepest spring). Text by Jeppe Aakjær
- XV. Det danske Brød paa Sletten gror (The Danish bread, it grows on plains). Text by Jeppe Aakjær
- XVI. Udrundne er de gamle Dage (Gone are the days, they're past and olden). Text by Nikolai Frederik Severin Grundtvig
- XVII. Betragt mit svage spind (melodi a) (Behold my web, how frail (Melody a)). Text by Adam Oehlenschläger
- XVIII. Frihed er det bedste guld (Freedom is the purest gold). Text by Thomas av Strängnäs
- XIX. Nu lyser Løv i Lunde (The greenwood leaves are light now). Text by Johannes Jørgensen
- XX. Syndfloden (The Flood). Text by Nikolai Frederik Severin Grundtvig

FS 101

Fire folkelige Melodier, "Four Folklike Melodies". Songs, texts by C. Richardt (1), B. Bjørnson (2,) C. Hostrup (3), N. F. S. Grundtvig (1922)

1. "Lær mig, Nattens Stjerne" ("Teach Me, Oh Stars of the Night") Text by Christian Richardt
2. "Sangen har Lysning" ("The Song Casts Light") Text by Bjørnstjerne Bjørnson
3. "Hvad synger du om?" ("Of What do You Sing") Text by Jens Christian Hostrup
4. "Nu skal det aabenbares" ("Now Shall it be Revealed"). Text by Nikolai Frederik Severin Grundtvig

FS 103

Folkehøjskolens Melodibog, The Folk High School Melody Book. Collection of Songs, ed. by Thorvald Aagaard, in collaboration with Carl Nielsen, Th. Laub, and O. Ring (1922).

- Den store Mester kommer! (The greatest master cometh!). Text by Bernhard Severin Ingemann
- Påskeblomst! (The Daffodil). Text by Nikolai Frederik Severin Grundtvig
- Udrundne er de gamle Dage (Gone are the days, they're past and olden). Text by Nikolai Frederik Severin Grundtvig
- Betragt mit svage spind (Behold my web, how frail). Text by Adam Oehlenschläger
- Jord, i hvis favn (Earth, whose embrace). Text by Christian Richardt
- Jeg så kun tilbage (I only looked back). Text by Bernhard Severin Ingemann
- Derfor kan vort øje glædes (Wherefore do our eyes feel pleasure). Text by Christian Richardt
- Naturens ædle dyrker (The noble nature student). Text by Carsten Hauch
- Når Somrens sang er sungen (When summer song is finished). Text by Jens Christian Hostrup
- Dér, hvor vi stred og sang (Where we would fight and sing). Text by Jens Christian Hostrup
- Vi fik ej under tidernes tryk (The stress of years could not jade our mind). Text by Jens Christian Hostrup
- På det jævne, på det jævne! (Simple-rooted, simple-rooted!). Text by Hans Vilhelm Kaalund
- Syndfloden (The Flood). Text by Nikolai Frederik Severin Grundtvig
- Der sad en fisker så tankefuld (There sat a fisherman deep in thought). Text by Nikolai Frederik Severin Grundtvig
- De snækker mødtes i kvæld på hav (The barques would meet on a sunset wave). Text by Nikolai Frederik Severin Grundtvig
- St. St. Blicher (Steen Steensen Blicher). Text by Carl Ploug
- Morgendug der, sagte bæver (Morning dew that slightly trembles). Text by Carsten Hauch
- Underlige Aftenlufte! (Odd and unknown evening breezes!). Text by Adam Oehlenschläger
- Rosen blusser alt i Danas Have (Rose is blooming now in Dana's borders) [only stanzas 1, 4-5, 7-9, 11-12]. Text by Poul Martin Møller
- Tunge, mørke natteskyer (Heavy, gloomy clouds of night). Text by Jakob Knudsen
- Jeg bærer med Smil min Byrde (I take with a smile my burden). Text by Jeppe Aakjær
- Du danske mand! af al din magt syng (Sing, Danish man! With all your might). Text by Holger Drachmann
- Vender sig Lykken fra dig (Fortune has lately left you). Text by Carsten Hauch
- Som dybest Brønd gir altid klarest Vand (Like purest waters rise from deepest spring). Text by Jeppe Aakjær
- Nu er Dagen fuld af Sang (Now the day is full of song). Text by Jeppe Aakjær
- Nu springer Vaaren fra sin Seng (Now, spring is leaping out of bed). Text by Viggo Stuckenberg
- Nu lyser Løv i Lunde (The greenwood leaves are light now). Text by Johannes Jørgensen
- De Refsnæsdrenge, de Samsøpiger (The Boys of Refsnæs, the Girls of Samsø). Text by Steen Steensen Blicher
- Farvel, min velsignede Fødeby! (Farewell, my respectable native town!). Text by Poul Martin Møller
- Se dig ud en Sommerdag (Look about one summer day). Text by Jeppe Aakjær
- I Skyggen vi vanke (In shadows we wander). Text by Adam Oehlenschläger
- Som en rejselysten Flaade (There's a fleet of floating islands). Text by Helge Rode

FS 114

1. "Ti dansk Smaasange" (Ten Little Danish Songs") Texts by various authors (1923–24)
2. "Jeg ved en Lærkerede" (I Know a Lark's Nest") (H. Bergstedt)
3. "Solen er saa rød Mor" (The Sun is So Red, Mother") (H. Bergstedt)
4. "Tyst som Aa i Engen rinder" (As Quietly as the Stream Runs in the Meadow") (H. Rode)
5. "Spurven sidder stum bag Kvist" (The Sparrow Sits in Silence Behind the Gable") (J. Aakjær)
6. "Den Spillemand spiller paa Strenge" (The Musician is Playing his Fiddle") (M. Damm)
7. "Naar Smaabørn klynker ved Aftentide" (When Small Children Whimper at Eventide") (C. Dabelsteen)
8. "Grøn er Vaarens Hæk" (Green in the Hedge in Spring") (P. Martin Møller)
9. "Jeg lægger mig saa trygt til ro" ("I Settle Down to Sleep so Snugly") (Chr. Winter)
10. "O, hvor jeg er glad i dag" ("Oh, Today I am so Happy") (M. Rosing)
11. "Den danske Sang" ("The Danish Song") (K. Hoffmann). Ti danske Smaasange (Ten Little Danish Songs) (1923–24)

FS 115

Fire jydske sange (Four Jutlandish Songs). Texts by A. Berntsen (1924–25)

1. "Jens Madsen aa An-Sofi" ("Jens Madsen to An-Sofi")
2. "Wo dætter" ("Our Daughter")
3. "Den jen aa den anden" ("One and the Other")
4. "Ae Lastrae" ("The Haypole")

FS 125. Tillæg til Folkehøjskolens Melodibog (Supplement to the Folk High School Melody Book)

- Lær mig, nattens stjærne (Teach me, star, precisely). Text by Christian Richardt
- Sangen har lysning (Singing illumines). Text by Bjørnstjerne Bjørnson
- Hvad synger du om så højt i det blå? (Of what do you sing up there in the blue?). Text by Jens Christian Hostrup
- Danevang med grønne bred (Denmark with your verdant shore). Text by Bernhard Severin Ingemann
- Nu skal det åbenbares (This is the revelation). Text by Nikolai Frederik Severin Grundtvig
- Jens Vejmand (Jens the Roadman). Text by Jeppe Aakjær
- Vi nævner et navn (We mention a name). Text by Knut Hamsun
- Havets Sang (Song of the Sea). Text by Laurits Christian Nielsen
- Vi sletternes sønner har drømme i sind (We, sons of the plains carry dreams in our minds). Text by Ludvig Holstein
- Der dukker af Disen min Fædrenejord (There out of the fog looms my ancestors' land). Text by Jeppe Aakjær
- Kan I mærke, det lysner af solskin i sindet (Do you feel how your mind from the sunshine grows lighter). Text by Jonas Gudlaugsson
- Frydeligt med jubelkor (Jubilation, shouts of glee). Text by Morten Børup
- Vinden er så føjelig (Winds are so employable). Text by Holger Drachmann
- Mit hjem, hvor mine fædres fjed (My home, where my forefathers' tread). Text by Peder Rasmussen Møller
- Der er en gammel rønne her udenfor vor by (There is a hoary hovel just outside this our town). Text by Mads Hansen
- Om strømmen mod dig bruser – vov at stå! (If torrents rush against you – dare resist!). Text by Steen Steensen Blicher
- Ud gaar du nu paa Livets Vej (Now you must find your path in life). Text by Steen Steensen Blicher
- Sang bag Ploven (Song behind the Plough). Text by Ludvig Holstein

==== Separate songs ====
FS	Danish title	English title	Author	Year composed
3n	Angst	Anxiety	Emil Aarestrup	1887
3o	Til mit Hjertes Dronning	To the Queen of my Heart	Percy Bysshe Shelley / Caralis (Christian Preetzmann)	1887
3p	Vejviseren synger	The Song of the Guide	J.S. Welhaven	1887
3q	Serenade	Serenade	Jeremiah Joseph Callanan / Caralis	1887
3r	Tag Jer i agt for Anna!	Bonnie Ann (Ye gallants bright, I rede ye right)	Robert Burns / Caralis	1887
3s	Min Sjæl er mørk	My soul is dark	Lord Byron / Caralis	1887
?	Den gamle Skovvei huer mig vel (a)	The ancient woodland road I like well (a)	Christian Richardt	?
?	Den gamle Skovvei huer mig vel (b)	The ancient woodland road I like well (b)	Christian Richardt	?
?	Alle de voksende Skygger	All the developing shadows	J.P. Jacobsen	?
13/1	Aldrig hans Ord kan jeg glemme	Ne'er may his words be forsaken!	Frederik Paludan-Müller	1891
13/2	I Drømmenes Land	The Realm of Dreams	J.P. Jacobsen	1891
35	Fædrelandssang	Danish Patriotic Song	Holger Drachmann	1906
38	Jeg synes om din lette Gang	I truly like your easy gait	Carl Nielsen?	1906
?	Alfholdssangen	Temperance Song	Moldberg-Kjeldsen	?
52	De Unges Sang	Song of the Young	Jens Christian Hostrup	1909
57	Halloges Sang	Halloge’s Song	Adam Oehlenschläger	1910
59	Paaske-Liljen	The Daffodil	Nikolai Frederik Severin Grundtvig	1910/?
62	Børnehjælpsdagens Sang	Child Welfare Day Song	Johannes Jørgensen	1911/?
66	Katholsk Ungdomssang	Catholic Song of Youth	Johannes Jørgensen	1913
69	Fredlys din Jord, du danske Mand!	Preserve your soil, each Danish man!	Anders W. Holm	1914/?
72	Barnets Sang	Children's Song	Johannes Dam	1915
75	Og jeg vil drage	The South I'm leaving	Holger Drachmann	1915/?
80	Ariels Sang	Ariel's Song	Helge Rode	1916
82	Studie efter Naturen	Study on Nature	Hans Christian Andersen	1916
83/2	Alt paa den vilde Hede	On moorland barren, level	Nikolai Frederik Severin Grundtvig	1912-16
84	Blomstervise	Flower Lay	Ludvig Holstein	1917
?	Est du modfalden	Are you discouraged	Nikolai Frederik Severin Grundtvig	1919
?	Som dug paa slagne Enge	As dew on grassy acre	Nikolai Frederik Severin Grundtvig	?
90	Christianshavn	Christianshavn	Ove Bauditz	1918
93	Gry	Dawn	Hansigne Lorenzen	1919-20
95/15	Det danske Brød paa Sletten gror	The Danish bread, it grows on plains	Jeppe Aakjær	1917-21
106	Julesang	Christmas Carol	Mogens Falck	1923
107	Julesang	Christmas Carol	Johannes Wiberg	1923
108	Hjemlige Jul	Homely Noel	Emil Bønnelycke	1923
109 (Op. 47)	Balladen om Bjørnen	Ballad of the Bear	Aage Berntsen	1923
110	Der er et yndigt Land	There is a lovely country	Adam Oehlenschläger	1924/?
111/9	Danmark (a)	Denmark (a)	Axel Juel	1923/?
?	Sof sött, du lilla Sonja!	Sleep sweetly, little Sonja!	Carl Nielsen?	?
?	Sang for Dansk Arbejde	Song for Danish Labour	Valdemar Rørdam	?
?	Du frie, danske Tunge	Free language of our mother	Johan Brydegaard	?
?	Lad en og anden have Ret	Let people, just a few, be right	Peter Faber	?
111/9	Danmark (b)	Denmark (b)	Axel Juel	1923/?
?	Kær est du, Fødeland, sødt er dit Navn	So dear my native land, thy name so sweet	Steen Steensen Blicher	?
112	Det vi véd, at siden slangens gift	This we know that since the poison	Jens Christian Hostrup	1923-24
114/2	Solen er saa rød, Mor	Look! The sun is red, mum	Harald Bergstedt	1923-24
114/3	Tyst som Aa i Engen rinder	Silent as a stream's meander	Helge Rode	1923-24
114/6	Naar Smaabørn klynker ved Aftentide	When babies whimper before the candle	Christian Dabelsteen	1923-24
114/9	O, hvor jeg er glad i Dag!	Oh, how glad I am today!	Michael Rosing	1923-24
?	Byg paa Sletten, ej paa Tin den	Build on lowland, not above it	Zakarias Nielsen	?
?	Vældige Riger rives om Jorden	Mighty the realms that rend earth asunder	Ahrent Otterstrøm	?
120	Morgenhanen atter gol	Morning cock again did crow	Nikolai Frederik Severin Grundtvig	1926/?
120	Ind under Jul, hvor er det trist	Nigh to Noel, how very sad	Jonas Lie	1926/?
120	I kølende Skygger (a)	In shadows so bracing (a)	Johannes Ewald	1926/?
120	I kølende Skygger (b)	In shadows so bracing (b)	Johannes Ewald	1926/?
120	Den gamle Husmand staar ved Gavl	An old smallholder at his ground	Johan Skjoldborg	1926/?
120	Hver har sit, du har dit og jeg har mit	You and I, everyone must qualify	Laurits Christian Nielsen	1926/?
120	Jeg kører frem gennem Straalefryd	I drive along in a splendent spell	Bjørnstjerne Bjørnson	1926/?
120	Dannebrog, vift med din Vinge	Dannebrog, fl ag in a fl utter	Steen Steensen Blicher	1926/?
120	Har I nu Tænder i Riven sat	Now, did the rake get its latter prong	Jeppe Aakjær	1926/?
121	Det är höst	Autumn's near	Alma Rogberg	1926
122	Dansk Vejr	Danish Weather	Ove Rode	1927
124	Vocalise-Étude	Vocalise-Étude	-	1927
126	Den trænger ud til hvert et sted	It's spreading everywhere with us	Jens Christian Hostrup	1927
?	Jeg gik i marken og vogtede får	Out in the fields I was watching the sheep	Nikolai Frederik Severin Grundtvig	1927
?	Apostlene sad i Jerusalem	Apostles convened in Jerusalem	Nikolai Frederik Severin Grundtvig	?
127	Guldfloden	River of Gold	Bernhard Severin Ingemann	1927-28
?	Nu ruger paa Reden i Fjer og Straa	On straw and on feather the brooding call	Ludvig Holstein	?
142	Hjemstavn	Homecoming	Frederik Poulsen	1929
143	Der går et stille tog	A silent file will reach	Bjørnstjerne Bjørnson	1929
145	Fremtidens Land!	Country to come!	Bjørnstjerne Bjørnson	1929
146	Danmark, nu blunder den lyse Nat	Denmark, now slumbers the Northern night	Thøger Larsen	1929
147	Vi Jyder	We of Jutland	Vilhelm From Bartrumsen	1929-30
?	Tanker skal tændes og skride	Thoughts must be lit, then exceeded	Hans Hartvig Seedorff Pedersen	?
151	Gensyn	Retrospect	Frederik Paludan-Müller	1930

=== Recitation and piano (or orchestra) ===
FS 134. Island (Iceland) (1929). Text by Otto Lagoni.

=== Choir and piano ===
FS 65. To Sange fra Adam Oehlenschlägers "Sanct Hansaftenspil" (Two Songs from Adam Oehlenschläger's "Midsummer Eve Play") (1913)

- I. I Skyggen vi vanke (In shadows we wander), for SSAA choir and piano
- II. I Maaneskin titter (As moonlight entrances), for SSATTBB choir and piano

== Songs with instrumental ensemble ==
FS 42, No. 4. Sænk kun dit Hoved du Blomst (Lay down, sweet flower, your head), for voice and orchestra. Text by Johannes Jørgensen (1906)
FS 110. Der er et yndigt land (There is a lovely country), for voice and orchestra. Text by Adam Oehlenschläger (1924)
FS 114, No. 5. Den Spillemand spiller paa Strenge (The fiddler is playing his fiddle), for voice and three violins. Text by Mads Damm (1923/1924)

== Songs for a cappella choir ==
=== Mixed choir ===
==== Collections ====
FS 54. To Sange fra "Kantate ved Aarhus Landsudstillings Aabnings-Højtidelighed 1909" (Two Songs from "Cantata for the Opening Ceremony of the National Exhibition of 1909 in Aarhus"), for SATB choir. Text by Laurits Christian Nielsen (1909)

- I. Skummende laa Havet (Foaming high, the waters rushed heavily ashore)
- II. Danmark, du kornblonde Datter (Denmark, ye corn-golden daughter)

FS 138

To Skolesange (Two School Songs) for unaccompanied choir, text by V. Stuckenberg (1929)

1. "Blomsterstøv fra Blomsterbæger" ("Pollen from the Calyx")
2. "Nu er for stakket tid forbi" ("Now for a Brief Time it's Over"')

FS 139 (Op. 55). Tre Motetter (Three Motets). Texts selected by Carl Nielsen and Anne Marie Carl-Nielsen (1929)

- I. Afflictus sum, (Psalm 38:9, Danish and French Psalm 37), for ATTB choir
- II. Dominus regit me, (Psalm 23:1-2, Danish and French Psalm 22), for SATB choir
- III. Benedictus, benedictus Dominus, (Psalm 31:22, Danish and French Psalm 30), for SSATB choir

==== Separate songs ====
FS	Danish title	English title	Choir formation	Author	Year composed
35	Fædrelandssang (Du danske mand! af al din magt syng)	Danish Patriotic Song (Sing, Danish man! With all your might)	SATB	Holger Drachmann	1906
40	Sidskensang	Siskin Song	SSAT	Emil Aarestrup	1907
?	Serenade (Gerne vi lytter, naar Stræangene bringer)	Serenade (Gladly we listen when music may carry)	SATB	Hother Ploug	1907
41	Kom, Gudsengel, stille Død	Come, God's angel, silent Death	ATB	Emil Aarestrup	1907
44/2	Ja, tag os, vor Moder	Yea, take us, our mother	SATB	Laurits Christian Nielsen	1908
62	Børnehjælpsdagens Sang (Vi Børn, vi Børn, vi vaagner)	Child Welfare Day Song (We boys and girls we waken)	SATB	Johannes Jørgensen	1911
?	Sangen til Danmark	Song to Denmark	SATB	Helge Rode	?
110	Der er et yndigt Land	There is a lovely country	SATTB	Adam Oehlenschläger	1924
110	Der er et yndigt Land	There is a lovely country	SATB	Adam Oehlenschläger	1924
70/5	Hjemvee (Underlige Aftenlufte!)	Homesickness (Odd and unknown evening breezes!)	SATB	Adam Oehlenschläger	1913/?
70/19	Jeg bærer med Smil min Byrde	I take with a smile my burden	SATB	Jeppe Aakjær	1915/?
154	Sjølunds Sangere	Zealand Singers	SATTB	Karl Elnegaard	1930
92/2	Udrundne er de gamle Dage	Gone are the days, they're past and olden	SATB	Nikolai Frederik Severin Grundtvig	1918/?
120	Vaaren – Vaaren er i Brudd!	Springtime – Springtime breaking through!	SATB	Morten Børup / Marinus Børup	1926/?
149	Sang for femstemmigt blandet Kor ved Dansk Ligbrændingsforenings Jubilæum den 23de Marts 1931	Song for Five-Part Mixed Chorus for the Anniversary of the Danish Cremation Society on 23 March 1931	SSATB	Sophus Michaëlis	1930

=== Male choir ===
FS	Danish title	English title	Author	Year composed
3m	Længsel (I hvor jeg end slaaer Øjet hen)	I Love My Jean (Of a' the airts the wind can blaw)	Robert Burns / Caralis	1887
3t	Byd mig at leve	Bid me to live, and I will live	Robert Herrick / Caralis	1887
14/4	Det bødes der for i lange Aar	You suffer throughout an age of pain	J.P. Jacobsen	1891/?
12/3	Til Asali	To Asali	J.P. Jacobsen	1891/?
28	Kom blankeste Sol!	Come, glistering sun!	Albert Thura	1901
35	Fædrelandssang (Du danske mand! af al din magt syng)	Danish Patriotic Song (Sing, Danish man! With all your might)	Holger Drachmann	1906
48	Aftenstemning	Evening	Matthias Claudius / Carsten Hauch	1908
52	De unges Sang	Song of the Young	Jens Christian Hostrup	1909/?
53	Til Snapsen i "Bel Canto"	To the Schnapps in "Bel Canto"	Aage Berntsen	1909
59	Paaske-Liljen	The Daffodil	Nikolai Frederik Severin Grundtvig	1910
62	Vi Børn, vi Børn, vi vaagner	We boys and girls we waken	Johannes Jørgensen	1911
67	Ak, Julesne fra Bethlehem	Ah, Bethlehem, your Christmas snow	Johannes Jørgensen	1914
69	Fredlys din Jord, du danske Mand!	Preserve your soil, each Danish man!	Anders W. Holm	1914
73	Hil dig vor Fane!	Banner, we hail thee!	Nikolai Frederik Severin Grundtvig	1915
110	Der er et yndigt land	There is a lovely country	Adam Oehlenschläger	1924
114/10	Den danske Sang er en ung, blond Pige	The Danish song is a fair young maiden	Kai Hoffmann	1924/?
144	Til min Fødeø	To My Native Island	S.P. Raben-Korch	1929
158	Kvadet om Nordens Harpe	Lay of the Nordic Harp	Aage Berntsen	1931

=== Equal voices ===
FS 111

Sangbogen Danmark (Songbook Denmark); a collection of Danish and Scandinavian songs, includes a foreword and some new songs by Nielsen; edited by Carl Nielsen and Hakon Andersen (every song is scored for soprano and alto) (1924)

- I. Danevang med grønne bred (Denmark with your verdant shore). Text by Bernhard Severin Ingemann
- II. Der er et yndigt land (There is a lovely country). Text by Adam Oehlenschläger
- III. Rosen blusser alt i Danas Have (Rose is blooming now in Dana's borders). Text by Poul Martin Møller
- IV. Lad en og anden have Ret (Let people, just a few, be right). Text by Peter Faber
- V. Morgendug der, sagte bæver (Morning dew that slightly trembles). Text by Carsten Hauch
- VI. Se dig ud en Sommerdag (Look about one summer day). Text by Jeppe Aakjær
- VII. Fædrelandssang (Du danske mand! af al din magt syng) (Danish Patriotic Song (Sing, Danish man! With all your might)). Text by Holger Drachmann
- VIII. Du gav os de Blomster, som lyste imod os (You gave us the flowers that glistened to show us). Text by Helge Rode
- IX. Danmark (Denmark). Text by Axel Juel
- X. Som en rejselysten Flaade (There's a fleet of floating islands). Text by Helge Rode
- XI. Kær est du, Fødeland, sødt er dit Navn (So dear my native land, thy name so sweet). Text by Steen Steensen Blicher
- XII. Der dukker af Disen min Fædrenejord (There out of the fog looms my ancestors' land). Text by Jeppe Aakjær
- XIII. Hjemvee (Underlige Aftenlufte!) (Homesickness (Odd and unknown evening breezes!)). Text by Adam Oehlenschläger
- XIV. Den kedsom Vinter gik sin Gang (The tedious winter went its course). Text by Ambrosius Stub
- XV. Frydeligt med jubelkor (Jubilation, shouts of glee). Text by Morten Børup
- XVI. Grøn er Vaarens Hæk (Springtime hedge is green). Text by Poul Martin Møller
- XVII. Nu er Dagen fuld af Sang (Now the day is full of song). Text by Jeppe Aakjær
- XVIII. I Skyggen vi vanke (In shadows we wander). Text by Adam Oehlenschläger
- XIX. Nu lyser Løv i Lunde (The greenwood leaves are light now). Text by Johannes Jørgensen
- XX. O, hvor jeg er glad i Dag! (Oh, how glad I am today!). Text by Michael Rosing
- XXI. Nu Sol i Øst oprinder mild (Now the sun arises in the East). Text by Carl Joakim Brandt
- XXII. Jeg lægger mig saa trygt til ro (In peace, I lay me down to sleep). Text by Christian Winther
- XXIII. Tyst som Aa i Engen rinder (Silent as a stream's meander). Text by Helge Rode
- XXIV. Sol er oppe! Skovens Toppe (Sun arises! Treetop guises). Text by Nikolai Frederik Severin Grundtvig
- XXV. De snækker mødtes i kvæld på hav (The barques would meet on a sunset wave). Text by Nikolai Frederik Severin Grundtvig
- XXVI. Søndret Folk er vokset sammen (Grown together, sundered nation). Text by Helge Rode
- XXVII. Udrundne er de gamle Dage (Gone are the days, they're past and olden). Text by Nikolai Frederik Severin Grundtvig
- XXVIII. De Unges Sang (Song of the Young). Text by Jens Christian Hostrup
- XXIX. Hymne til Danmark (Hymn to Denmark). Text by Valdemar Rørdam
- XXX. Er din Stue lav og trang (Is your dwelling low and tight). Text by Laurits Christian Nielsen
- XXXI. På det jævne, på det jævne! (Simple-rooted, simple-rooted!). Text by Hans Vilhelm Kaalund
- XXXII. Byg paa Slet ten, ej paa Tin den (Build on lowland, not above it). Text by Zakarias Nielsen
- XXXIII. Vi fri Folk fra Norden (We free Nordic nation). Text by Valdemar Rørdam
- XXXIV. Vældige Riger rives om Jorden (Mighty the realms that rend earth asunder). Text by Ahrent Otterstrøm
- XXXV. Havets Sang (Song of the Sea). Text by Laurits Christian Nielsen
- XXXVI. Når Somrens sang er sungen (When summer song is finished). Text by Jens Christian Hostrup
- XXXVII. Sov, mit Barn, sov længe (Sleep, my child, sleep sweetly). Text by Christian Richardt
- XXXVIII. Spurven sidder stum bag Kvist (Sparrows hushed behind the bough). Text by Jeppe Aakjær
- XXXIX. Farvel, min velsignede Fødeby! (Farewell, my respectable native town!). Text by Poul Martin Møller
- XL. Ud gaar du nu paa Livets Vej (Now you must find your path in life). Text by Steen Steensen Blicher (only stanzas 1, 3-5)
- XLI. Jeg ved en Lærkerede (Two larks in love have nested). Text by Harald Bergstedt
- XLII. Solen er saa rød, Mor (Look! The sun is red, mum). Text by Harald Bergstedt
- XLIII. Den Spillemand spiller paa Strenge (The fiddler is playing his fiddle). Text by Mads Damm
- XLIV. Naar Smaabørn klynker ved Aftentide (When babies whimper before the candle). Text by Christian Dabelsteen

FS 152

60 Danske Kanoner (60 Danish Canons); six of them by Nielsen (1930), for unaccompanied choir, texts by Carl Nielsen (1), H. C. Andersen (2), Holberg (3 and 4, translated by S. Muller), Book of Job (5), Carl Nielsen (6, his motto to the Helios Overture) (1930)

1. "Bokserne" ("The Boxers")
2. "Traaden brister" ("The Thread Snaps")
3. "Vægter, jeg beder" ("Watchman I Beg You")
4. "Ikke det altid slaar til" ("It Isn't Always So")
5. "Du skal le ad Ødelæggelse" ("At Destruction and Famine Thou Shalt Laugh")
6. "Stilhed og Mørke" ("Silence and Dark")

==== Separate songs ====
Every song scored for soprano and alto.

FS	Danish title	English title	Author	Year composed
27	Edderkoppens Sang af "Aladdin" (Betragt mit svage spind)	The Spider's Song from "Aladdin" (Behold my web, how frail)	Adam Oehlenschläger	1899
28	Kom blankeste Sol! (a)	Come, glistering sun! (a)	Albert Thura	1901
28	Kom blankeste Sol! (b)	Come, glistering sun! (b)	Albert Thura	1901
34a	Morten Børups Majvise (Frydeligt med jubelkor)	Morten Børup's Song of May (Jubilation, shouts of glee)	Morten Børup / Frederik Moth	1906
34	Børnehjælpdagens Sang (Vi Børn, vi Børn, vi vaagner)	Child Welfare Day Song (We boys and girls we waken)	Johannes Jørgensen	1911
35	Fædrelandssang (Du danske mand! af al din magt syng)	Danish Patriotic Song (Sing, Danish man! With all your might)	Holger Drachmann	1906/?
72	Barnets Sang (Kom, i Dag maa alle synge)	Children's Song (Come today and join the chorus)	Johannes Dam	1915
94/2	Min pige er saa lys som Rav	Like golden amber is my girl	Helge Rode	1920/?
110	Der er et yndigt land	There is a lovely country	Adam Oehlenschläger	1924
111/19	Hymne til Danmark	Hymn to Denmark	Valdemar Rørdam	1917/1923
111/23	Tyst som Aa i Engen rinder	Silent as a stream's meander	Helge Rode	1923/1924
113	Hymne til Livet	Hymn to Life	Sophus Michaëlis	1923-24
146	Danmark, nu blunder den lyse Nat (a)	Denmark, now slumbers the Northern night (a)	Thøger Larsen	1929/?
146	Danmark, nu blunder den lyse Nat (b)	Denmark, now slumbers the Northern night (b)	Thøger Larsen	1929/?
161	Græshoppen	Grasshopper	Bernhard Severin Ingemann	1899
?	Jeg har båret lærkens vinge	Skylark wings I used to carry	Michael Rosing	?
?	Jeg kører frem gennem Straalefryd	I drive along in a splendent spell	Bjørnstjerne Bjørnson	?
?	Nu ruger paa Reden i Fjer og Straa	On straw and on feather the brooding call	Ludvig Holstein	?

=== Unison songs ===
==== Collections ====
FS 75. Melodier til Johan Borups Sangbog (Melodies for Johan Borup's Song Book) (1915)
FS 120. Nye Melodier til Johan Borups Sangbog (New Melodies for Johan Borup's Song Book) (1926)

- Morgenhanen atter gol (Morning cock again did crow). Nikolai Frederik Severin Grundtvig
- Vaaren, Vaaren er i Brud (Springtime, Springtime breaking through). Text by Morten & Marinus Børup
- Grøn er Vaarens Hæk (Springtime hedge is green). Text by Poul Martin Møller
- Ind under Jul, hvor er det trist (Nigh to Noel, how very sad). Text by Jonas Lie
- Nu spinder vi for Dittemor (We're spinning now for Lizzy Lass). Text by Martin Andersen Nexø
- Undrer mig paa, hvad jeg faar at se (Wonder whatever I get to see). Text by Bjørnstjerne Bjørnson
- Spurven sidder stum bag Kvist (Sparrows hushed behind the bough). Text by Jeppe Aakjær (only stanzas 1, 5, 7-8)
- I kølende Skygger (In shadows so bracing). Text by Johannes Ewald
- En Sømand med et modigt Bryst (A sailor with a plucky breast). Text by Johannes Ewald
- Den gamle Husmand staar ved Gavl (An old smallholder at his ground). Text by Johan Skjoldborg
- Hver har sit, du har dit og jeg har mit (You and I, everyone must qualify). Text by Laurits Christian Nielsen
- Jeg kører frem gennem Straalefryd (I drive along in a splendent spell). Text by Bjørnstjerne Bjørnson
- Dannebrog, vift med din Vinge (Dannebrog, flag in a flutter). Text by Steen Steensen Blicher
- Jeg er saa glad i Grunden (I'm really so delighted). Text by Bjørnstjerne Bjørnson
- Den Magt som gav mig min lille Sang (This force which gave me my little song). Text by Bjørnstjerne Bjørnson
- Har I nu Tænder i Riven sat (Now, did the rake get its latter prong). Text by Jeppe Aakjær

==== Separate songs ====
FS	Danish title	English title	Author	Year composed
3g	Vuggevise	Lullaby	Carl Nielsen?	1883
51	Vi frie Folk fra Norden	We sov'reign Nordic nation	Valdemar Rørdam	1924
?	Student-Tanker i en Gymnastiksal	Student Thoughts in the Gymnasium	Ernesto Dalgas	?
83/19	Guds Fred er mer end Englevagt	God's peace is more than angel guard	Nikolai Frederik Severin Grundtvig	1912-16
75	Og jeg vil drage fra Sydens Blommer	The South I'm leaving	Holger Drachmann	1915
120	Vaaren, Vaaren er i Brud!	Springtime, Springtime breaking through!	Morten Børup / Marinus Børup	1926
133	Velkommen Lærkelil	My welcome, little lark	Christian Richardt	1928

== See also ==
- List of compositions by Carl Nielsen
