= Symphony No. 6 (Nielsen) =

1925 symphony by Carl Nielsen

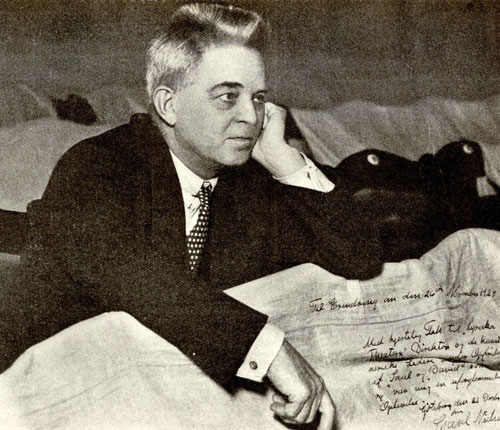
Carl Nielsen in 1928

Symphony No. 6 "Sinfonia semplice" (no opus number), FS 116, was Danish composer Carl Nielsen's last symphony.

== History ==
He began working on it in August 1924 and by the end of October wrote to Carl Johan Michaelsen:

As far as I can see, it will on the whole be different from my other symphonies: more amiable and smooth, or how shall I put it, but it is impossible to tell as I do not know at all what currents I may run into during the voyage.

The first movement was finished at the end of November while he was in Copenhagen, and the second movement was composed during Christmas. At the end of January 1925 he traveled to the French Riviera with his wife.

While he had been in Copenhagen, Nielsen had composed the third movement, but he now had to put the symphony aside to work on a commission for incidental music to Ebbe Skammelsøn, which was to be performed at the Open Air Theatre in the deer park. He completed the Ebbe Skammelsøn score immediately before his sixtieth birthday on June 9. While traveling to Damgaard (Note: Fanning 1997, p. 97: Damgaard was the home of Nielsen's friend Charlotte Trap de Tygeson in Jutland.) in the middle of July 1925, Nielsen was able to continue work on his symphony.

The last movement was finally completed on December 5, 1925. The first performance was given by the Chapel Royal Orchestra on December 11. The Copenhagen reviewers were confused by the style of the new Symphony. Nielsen had called it "Sinfonia semplice" (Simple Symphony). It has remained the least performed of all six symphonies.

== Instrumentation ==
Woodwinds

2 flutes (1st doubling piccolo)
2 oboes
2 clarinets in A (later in B♭)
2 bassoons

Brass

4 horns in F
2 trumpets in F
3 trombones (2 tenor, 1 bass)
tuba

Percussion

timpani

glockenspiel
xylophone
triangle
cymbals
snare drum
bass drum

Strings

violins I
violins II
violas
cellos
double basses

== Description ==
There are four movements:

1. Tempo giusto
2. Humoreske: Allegretto
3. Proposta seria: Adagio
4. Tema con variazioni: Allegro

According to Robert Simpson, from the second edition of his book on Nielsen, this work may be partially autobiographical; the composer had just experienced a tremendous success with his Fifth symphony, but had also suffered a series of heart attacks. He was to write several more works, but in the remaining six years of his life, the atmosphere of his works began to change.

As with many other works by Nielsen starting as early as his first symphony, this symphony uses "progressive tonality", not only starting in one key (G major), and ending in another (B♭), but making the change part of the drama of the work.

=== I. Tempo giusto ===
The chiming of a glockenspiel opens the symphony, followed by a melody in octaves played by the violins. This is followed in turn by active and very characteristic figures in the winds.

As in the fifth symphony there is an early hint of the key B♭ in which the symphony will eventually close, since the wind response hits that B♭ as an on-and-off note in an otherwise G major passage. The mood of the opening gives way to fugal unrest and, eventually, two chaotic and disturbing outbursts (Simpson believes these reflect Nielsen's heart attacks, in a manner of speaking, though he does not claim that the piece is programmatic), before again quieting, to a lightly scored but unsettled close in A♭.

=== II. Humoreske ===
The Humoreske is for winds and percussion alone. In the notes Nielsen wrote for the symphony's premiere, he said that wind and percussion in the movement "quarrel, each sticking to his own tastes and inclinations"; Nielsen went on to liken this to the musical world of the time.

=== III. Proposta seria ===
Proposta seria. To paraphrase Simpson, again, several passages in this movement circle around as though snakes chasing for-the-moment lost tails.

=== IV. Tema con variazioni ===
Fanfare, theme and variations, fanfare-reprise and coda, on a fairly unstable theme in B♭. The ninth variation, just before the fanfare-reprise and coda, has a sound and affect like that of the Humoreske — Simpson likens it to a grinning skeleton; as in many sets of variations, it is preceded by a minor key variation (a variation in the parallel minor), but one that is so protracted that when its last minor cadence arrives it is difficult to grasp as one whole variation. The critic Robert Layton has described this as a lament.

The last note of the piece is a sustained low B♭ played loudly on two bassoons.

== Sources ==
- Fanning, David (1997). Nielsen: Symphony No. 5. Cambridge University Press. ISBN 978-0-521-44088-2 – via Internet Archive.
- Simpson, Robert (1979). Carl Nielsen, Symphonist, 1865–1931 (2nd ed.). London: Kahn & Averill. pp. 112–136. ISBN 978-0-900707-46-9.
