= Symphony No. 2 (Nielsen) =

Symphony by Carl Nielsen

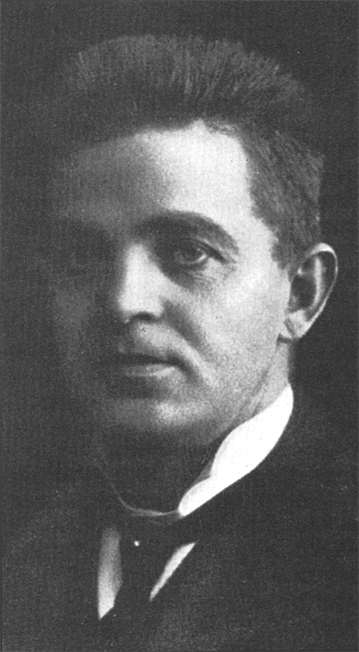
Carl Nielsen, composer of Symphony No. 2

Symphony No. 2 De fire Temperamenter ("The Four Temperaments"), Op. 16, FS 29, is the second symphony by Danish composer Carl Nielsen, written in 1901–1902 and dedicated to Ferruccio Busoni. It was first performed on 1 December 1902 for the Danish Concert Association, with Nielsen himself conducting. As indicated in the subtitle, each of its four movements is a musical sketch of a humor of the four temperaments: choleric, phlegmatic, melancholic, and sanguine. Despite its apparent concept of program music, the work is a fully integrated symphony in traditional symphonic structure.

== Background ==
Nielsen began on the Second Symphony while the work on his first opera, Saul and David was still in progress. The first movement was finished on 28 December 1901 but after this the composition made slow progress. The composer only finished his work at the last moment. The fourth movement is dated 22 November 1902, just a week before the first performance.

Nielsen himself describes the background to the symphony in a programme note for a performance at the Konsertföreningen (Concert Society) in Stockholm shortly before he died in 1931.

I had the idea for ‘The Four Temperaments’ many years ago at a country inn in Zealand. On the wall of the room where I was drinking a glass of beer with my wife and some friends hung an extremely comical coloured picture, divided into four sections in which ‘the Temperaments’ were represented and furnished with titles: ‘The Choleric’, ‘The Sanguine’, ‘The Melancholic’ and ‘The Phlegmatic’. The Choleric was on horseback. He had a long sword in his hand, which he was wielding fiercely in thin air; his eyes were bulging out of his head, his hair streamed wildly around his face, which was so distorted by rage and diabolical hate that I could not help bursting out laughing. The other three pictures were in the same style, and my friends and I were heartily amused by the naivety of the pictures, their exaggerated expression and their comic earnestness. But how strangely things can sometimes turn out! I, who had laughed aloud and mockingly at these pictures, returned constantly to them in my thoughts, and one fine day I realized that these shoddy pictures still contained a kind of core or idea and – just think! – even a musical undercurrent! Some time later, then, I began to work out the first movement of a symphony, but I had to be careful that it did not fence in the empty air, and I hoped of course that my listeners would not laugh so that the irony of fate would smite my soul.

== Music ==
Its movements and their respective temperament illustrated are:

1. Allegro collerico (Choleric)
2. Allegro comodo e flemmatico (Phlegmatic)
3. Andante malincolico (Melancholic)
4. Allegro sanguineo — Marziale (Sanguine)

The composer's inspiration for the symphony came from a four-part comical picture of the temperaments in a village pub in Zealand during a visit with his wife and friends. In his account of the symphony (quoted in full in Simpson 1979, pp. 53–55), Nielsen gave a detailed outline of his vision for each temperament in each of the four movements. For example, in the phlegmatic temperament of the second movement, the composer visualized a young teenager who is loved by all:

His real inclination was to lie where the birds sing, where the fish glide noiselessly through the water, where the sun warms and the wind strokes mildly round one's curls. He was fair; his expression was rather happy, but not self-complacent, rather with a hint of quiet melancholy, so that one felt impelled to be good to him... I have never seen him dance; he wasn't active enough for that, though he might easily have got the idea to swing himself in a gentle slow waltz rhythm, so I have used that for the movement, Allegro comodo e flemmatico, and tried to stick to one mood, as far away as possible from energy, emotionalism, and such things.

Whereas the finale symbolizes a cheerful man:

I have tried to sketch a man who storms thoughtlessly forward in the belief that the whole world belongs to him, that fried pigeons will fly into his mouth without work or bother. There is, though, a moment in which something scares him, and he gasps all at once for breath in rough syncopations: but this is soon forgotten, and even if the music turns to minor, his cheery, rather superficial nature still asserts itself.

Progressive tonality is demonstrated in the symphony, progressing from B minor to A major; the first three movements are in descending thirds: B minor, G major, and E♭ minor, and the final movement springs out in the D major chord. The second symphony, like the first, still belongs to the tradition of Brahms and Dvořák, but is more compact and concentrated, with a simple but powerful ending that takes the form of an A major march.

== Reception ==
Nielsen himself conducted the first performance of The Four Temperaments in a concert at the Dansk Koncertforening on 1 December 1902, just three days after he had conducted the premiere of Saul and David at the Royal Theatre. The symphony was well received by the audience, and the press was generally positive. But not all the reviews were good. Writing in the Danish newspaper Dannebrog, composer and music critic Leopold Rosenfeld commented: "Carl Nielsen’s new work should, I suppose, rather be called a suite of moods for orchestra than designated as what we understand by a symphony. But aside from the name, this new work by the highly fêted composer again bears favourable testimony to its author’s uncommon ability to give expression to characteristic sound painting through a considerable orchestral technique. Whether one really dares call these constructed orchestral sounds music is another question again. What is especially captivating about these musical illustrations is the composer’s ability to mix colours, which neglects no opportunity to exercise the listening ear. Sometimes, though, the colours are very brutal and in their crudeness easily cross the aesthetic line."

In January 1903 Carl Nielsen and his friend the pianist Henrik Knudsen travelled to Germany to stir up interest in both the new symphony and Saul and David. When in Berlin, they showed the symphony to Ferruccio Busoni whom Nielsen had known since 1891. Busoni took an interest in the work and promised to put it on the programme in the series of concerts of new and rarely heard music that he was giving at this time with the Berlin Philharmonic. It was probably out of gratitude for this gesture that Nielsen dedicated the work to Busoni. On 5 November 1903 the symphony was performed in Berlin, with Nielsen conducting. As Busoni had warned, the work was not very well received.

The symphony did, however, gain increasing popularity, quickly becoming one of Nielsen’s best loved orchestral works. By 1928, the composer had conducted at least 13 performances in Denmark, Norway (Oslo and Bergen), Sweden (Gothenburg) and Germany (Berlin). In 1921, it was also performed in London under Sir Henry Wood and, in 1927, by the Pasdeloup Orchestra in Paris conducted by Frederik Schnedler-Petersen.

The first recording (the first commercial recording of any Nielsen symphony) was made by Thomas Jensen with the Danish Radio Symphony Orchestra in 1944 but was not released due to noisy test pressings; but in 1947 the same forces recorded it again, this being released on HMV Z7000/03.

== Instrumentation ==
- 3 flutes, 3rd flute doubles piccolo
- 2 oboes, 2nd oboe doubles English horn
- 2 clarinets in A, B♭
- 2 bassoons
- 4 French horns in F
- 3 trumpets in F
- 3 trombones (2 tenor, 1 bass)
- tuba
- timpani
- strings

The symphony also exists in a version for piano four hands by Knudsen.
