= Serenata in vano =

1914 quintet by Carl Nielsen

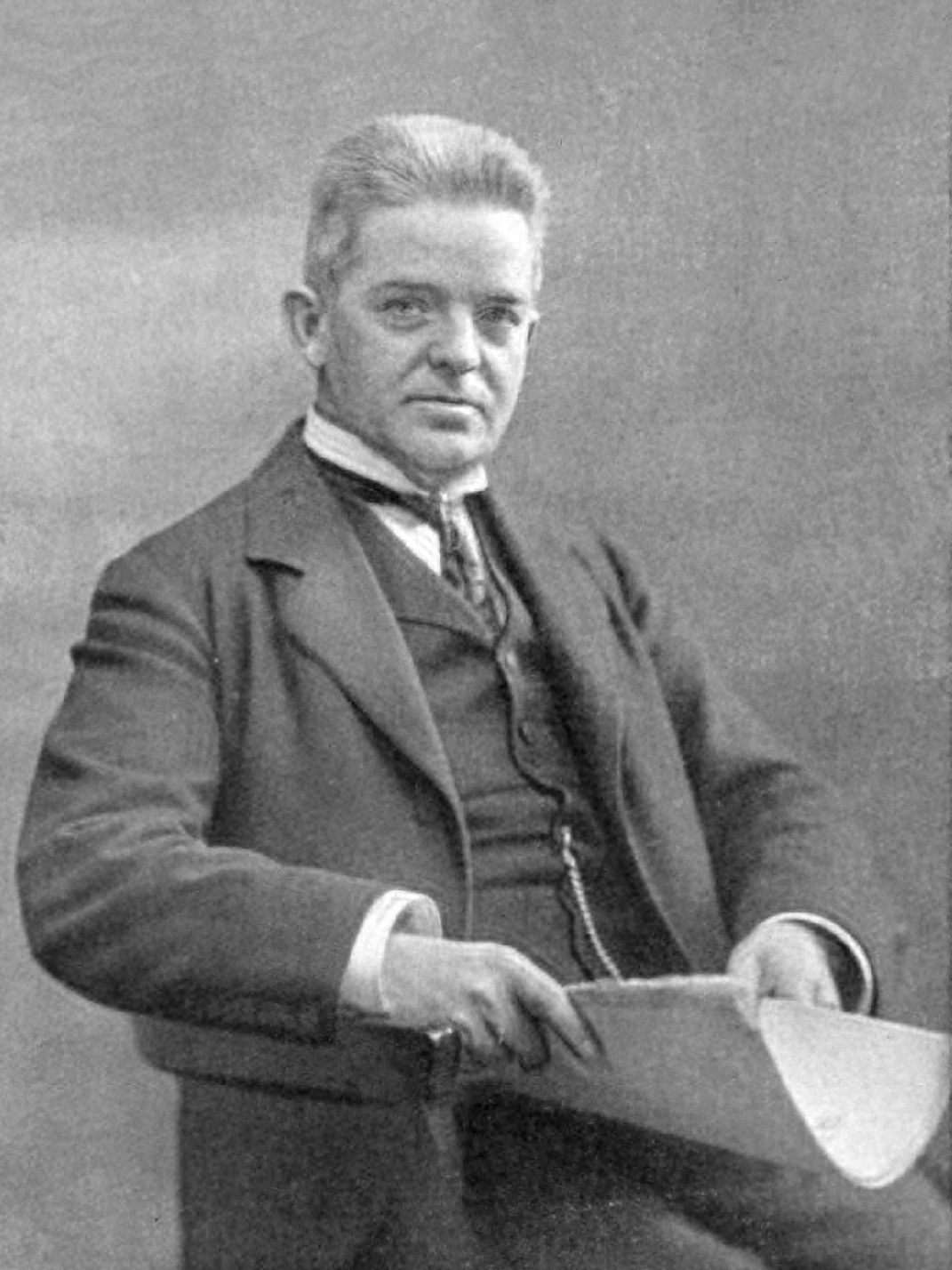
Carl Nielsen in 1917

Carl Nielsen's Serenata in vano, a quintet for clarinet, bassoon, horn, cello and double-bass, FS 68, was composed in 1914. It was apparently written at short notice, commissioned by Ludvig Hegner of the Royal Theatre for a tour of the Danish provinces.

== Background ==
The year 1914 was not a pleasant one for Nielsen. Georg Høeberg had been engaged as conductor at the Royal Theatre although Nielsen had been deputy conductor for six years. This led him to hand in his resignation at the end of the 1913–14 season. He apparently composed the little quintet Serenata in vano in May, before he embarked on his fourth symphony. The probability that it was written for a tour is supported by a letter from Henrik Knudsen who reported: "Once when I went to see him a printed programme for a tour in the provinces lay there. On it was written: Carl Nielsen – Serenade. It was to be held in about a week. ‘What is that’, I said. ‘Serenade, I don’t know that one.’ ‘Nor do I,’ he said. But it was composed and fully rehearsed within a week."

== Reception ==
The tour began on 3 June 1914 in Nykøbing Falster and ended on 30 June in Skanderborg. On 4 June, the Nykjøbing Dagblad reported: "Yesterday evening the Music Society held its fourth concert of the season. It was the Hegner tour, consisting of members of the Royal Orchestra and Messrs. Dietzmann and Espersen, who visited the society. The programme was Mozart ’s Divertissemento, a serenade by Carl Nielsen – it was performed yesterday evening for the first time – and Beethoven’s Septet. On 8 June the concert was repeated in Horsens. The programme shows that the serenade was played by the members of the Royal Orchestra: Carl Skjerne (clarinet), Peter Robertson (French horn), Ludvig Hegner (double-bass), the bassoonist Carlos Espersen and the cellist Rudolf Dietzmann. Horsens Folkeblad commented that Nielsen could hardly live up to the other composers although: "his Serenato in vano is actually an amusing effort – in particular the instrumentation in the peculiar configuration clarinet, bassoon, French horn, cello and double-bass is adroit. But it cannot be denied that yesterday evening it gave a slightly heavy and strained impression." The other reviews of piece later in the tour were no more enthusiastic.

The Serenata was first performed in Copenhagen on 13 April 1915 in the smaller hall of the Odd Fellows Mansion. According to the programme, the musicians were N.P.S. Nørlund (clarinet), August Devald (bassoon), K.V. Sørensen (French horn), Dr. Carl Meyer (violoncello) and Anton Petersen (double-bass). The reviews of this concert concentrated on the performance of Nielsen's songs, the main item, while the quintet was only briefly mentioned despite Berlingske Tidende's assertion that "it was a success, and the final movement, which was the best, had to be repeated."

== Later performances ==
Between 1917 and 1928, concert programmes show that the serenade was performed at least ten times.

== Music ==
"Serenata in vano is a humorous trifle," Nielsen wrote. "First the gentlemen play in a somewhat chivalric and showy manner to lure the fair one out onto the balcony, but she does not appear. Then they play in a slightly languorous strain (Poco adagio), but that hasn't any effect either. Since they have played in vain (in vano), they don't care a straw and shuffle off home to the strains of the little final march, which they play for their own amusement."
