= Symphony No. 1 (Nielsen) =

1894 Symphony by Carl Nielsen

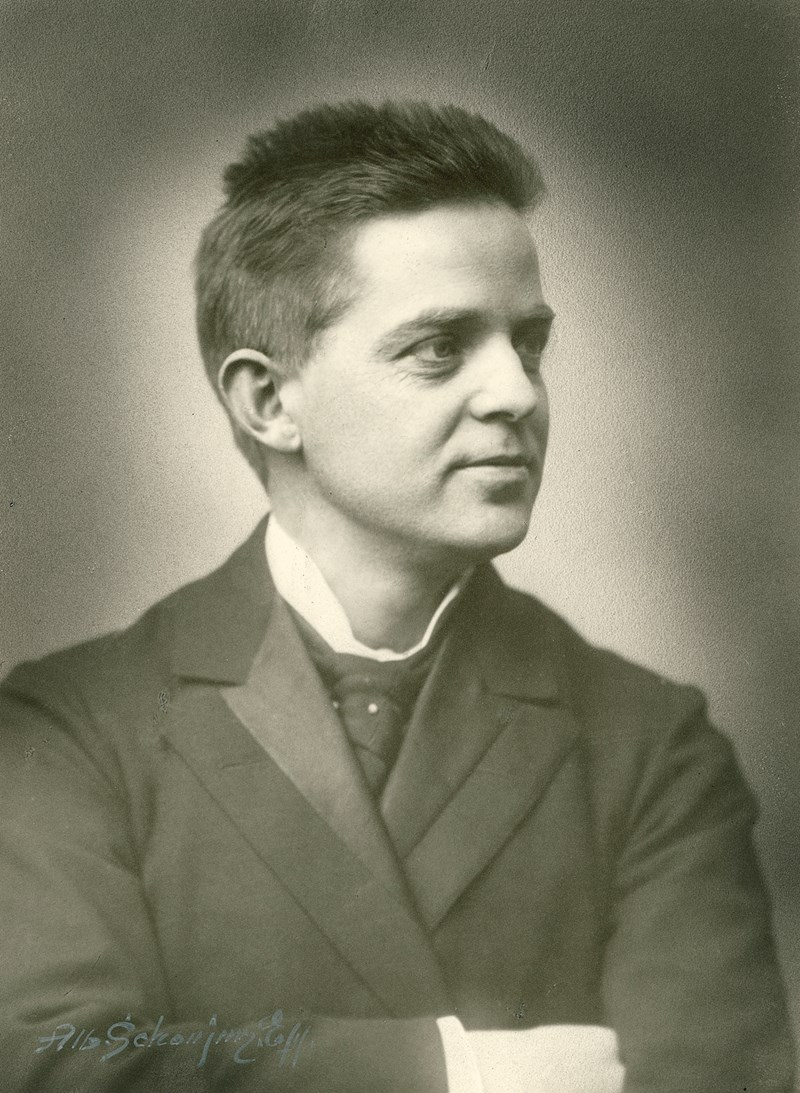
Carl Nielsen in 1901

Symphony No. 1 in G minor, Op. 7, FS 16, is the first symphony of Danish composer Carl Nielsen. Written between 1891 and 1892, it was dedicated to his wife, Anne Marie Carl-Nielsen. The work's première, on 14 March 1894, was performed by Johan Svendsen conducting the Chapel Royal Orchestra (Royal Danish Orchestra), with Nielsen himself among the second violins. It is one of two symphonies by Nielsen without a subtitle (the other being his Symphony No. 5).

== Structure ==
The symphony is in the standard four movements:

1. Allegro orgoglioso
2. Andante
3. Allegro comodo – Andante sostenuto – Tempo I
4. Finale. Allegro con fuoco

A typical performance takes approximately 35 minutes.

The symphony's melodies have a distinctive Danish flavour and are imbued with Nielsen's personal style. Nielsen scholar Robert Simpson describes the composer's symphonic debut as "probably the most highly organized first symphony ever written by a young man of twenty-seven."

The work opens in G minor, and closes with a rousing peroration in C major. This tendency to move away from the original key to C major is the basis of the whole symphony's tonal structure, and displays for the first time Nielsen's hallmark compositional device, "progressive tonality." (Nielsen at one stage even thought of calling the work "Symphony in C".) Simpson states "it is possibly the first symphony to end in a key other than that in which it started".

== Instrumentation ==
- 3 flutes, flute 1 doubles piccolo in movement IV
- 2 oboes
- 2 clarinets in B♭
- 2 bassoons
- 4 horns (1 and 2 in E♭, G, and C basso; 3 and 4 in B♭ basso and F)
- 2 trumpets in E♭ and C
- 3 trombones (2 tenor, 1 bass)
- timpani
- strings
