= Progressive tonality =

Music that starts and ends in different keys

Progressive tonality is the music compositional practice whereby a piece of music does not finish in the key in which it began, but instead 'progresses' to an ending in a different key or tonality. In this connection 'different key' means a different tonic, rather than merely a change to a different mode: (Note: See Picardy third and List of major/minor compositions) Gustav Mahler's Second Symphony (1888–94), for example, which moves from a C minor start to an E♭ major conclusion, exhibits 'progressive tonality'—whereas Ludwig van Beethoven's Fifth Symphony (1804–08), which begins in C minor and ends in C major, does not. A work which ends in the key in which it began may be described as exhibiting 'concentric tonality'. The terms 'progressive' and 'concentric' were both introduced into musicology by Dika Newlin in her book Bruckner, Mahler, Schoenberg (1947).

== Instrumental and orchestral ==
In instrumental and orchestral music, progressive tonality is a development of the later nineteenth century, but its seeds are already evident in the early part of the century. One of the results of Franz Schubert's creation of the four-movement fantasy (in such works as the Wanderer Fantasy and the Fantasy in F minor) was that individual movements no longer ended in the key in which they began but rather in the key of the immediately following movement. Other composers became increasingly fascinated with ending movements in unstable ways.

Fanny Hensel, Robert Schumann, and Frédéric Chopin all employed, at one point or another, the technique of avoiding a full cadence on the tonic in the last measure of a piece to create a sense of ambiguous closure (examples of this are: Hensel's lied 'Verlust,' published by Felix Mendelssohn as Op. 9, No. 10; Schumann's lied 'Im wunderschönen Monat Mai' from Dichterliebe, Op. 48, No. 1; Chopin's Mazurka in A minor, Op. 17, No. 4). Chopin explored progressive tonality in his instrumental music as well (see his second ballade, beginning in F major and ending in A minor) and efforts by him and other progressive composers such as Hector Berlioz and Franz Liszt (whose 1855 Dante Symphony begins in D minor and ends in B major), had a profound effect on later composers, such as Richard Wagner, whose harmonic developments in Tristan und Isolde and Der Ring des Nibelungen were altogether different from the use of tonal language by previous composers. Charles-Valentin Alkan also contributed several pieces, such as his Grande sonate 'Les quatre âges' (beginning in D major and ending in G♯ minor), his Symphony for Solo Piano (beginning in C minor and ending in E♭ minor), and his Concerto for Solo Piano (beginning in G♯ minor and ending in F♯ major).

Progressive tonality in the late nineteenth century no doubt reflects the increasingly programmatic and narrative orientation of 'late Romantic' music. Thus it occurs in five of the symphonies of Mahler (nos. 2, 4, 5, 7, and 9) but never at all in the symphonies of his predecessors Brahms or Bruckner. As Mahler's 7th Symphony shows, 'progressive tonality' may occur within an individual movement (the work's first movement 'progresses' from an implied B minor to an explicit E major) as well as across an entire multi-movement design (the symphony ends with a C major finale).

== Vocals ==
Vocal music, with its explicit and verbally defined narrative and programmatic allegiances, perhaps featured the initial exploration of 'progressive tonality.' While J.S. Bach in his instrumental and orchestral suites would often place every movement in the same key (see, for example, the solo cello Suites, BWV 1007-1012 or the equally homotonal A minor solo flute partita BWV 1013), in a work like his St Matthew Passion he felt able to 'progress' from an E minor start to an ending in C minor, and his Mass in B minor actually ends in D major. Nor, after the establishment of opera, did composers feel compelled to end even individual operatic acts and scenes in the starting key. Single operatic 'numbers' which (usually for some discernible dramatic and expressive purpose) fail to return to their original tonics can also be found—while in the quartets, symphonies and sonatas of the time such a practise was exceedingly uncommon.

As in his symphonies, Mahler took the idea of 'progressive tonality' in the song cycle to an extreme of refinement: each of his four Lieder eines fahrenden Gesellen ends in a key other than its original tonic. The four songs 'progress' as follows: (1) D minor to G minor; (2) D major to F♯ major; (3) D minor to E♭ minor; (4) E minor to F minor.

== Schenker ==
For musical analysts of a Schenkerian orientation, progressive tonality presents a challenge. Heinrich Schenker's concept of the 'background' Ursatz (fundamental structure), rooted as it is in a metaphysically elaborated appreciation of the acoustic resonance of a single tone, inclines towards a severely monotonal approach to musical structure: either the opening or the closing key of a progressive tonal structure will frequently not be considered to be a true tonic.

By contrast, Graham George developed a theory of 'interlocking tonal structures', in which two tonal 'axes' could coexist, with the second emerging after the first was established, and persisting after it was abandoned. Later generations of Schenkerians, following Harald Krebs have begun to identify "background conglomerates" in works that permanently change tonics: in this approach, two fundamental structures (Ursätze) are held to be present in the background of such works, one of them being the so-called elided fundamental structure (Ursatz).

== Keller and others ==
In British post-World War II musicology, 'progressive tonality' was sometimes contrasted with 'regressive tonality' (e.g. in the analytic and critical writings of Hans Keller). The distinction was not one of chronological or stylistic 'advancedness', but rather a means of distinguishing between tonal motions that could either be reckoned as 'up' or 'down' around a circle of fifths construed as intersecting with the original tonic. By this measure, Mahler's 4th Symphony would exhibit 'progressive tonality' (it begins in G and ends in E, three fifths 'higher')—while the same composer's 5th Symphony would display 'regressive tonality' (it begins in C♯ and ends in D, five fifths 'lower').

The same period showed a quickening of interest in 'progressive tonality' as displayed in the music of Carl Nielsen, in which it plays a particularly significant role. In Nielsen's Fourth Symphony, for example, the initial tonal focus of D minor (clashing with C) issues at the end of the work in a firm E major. In the two-movement Fifth Symphony, more radical in this regard, the first movement begins in F and rises by fifths to a conclusion in G, while the second begins on B, with an opposing pull to F, and while tending towards A major works round instead, by a similar tritone opposition, to a triumphant close in E♭. The tonal workings of these symphonies were analysed with particular clarity by the British composer and writer Robert Simpson in his book Carl Nielsen, Symphonist (first edition 1952), which gave the whole conception of 'progressive tonality' something like popular currency in the English-speaking world; and similar principles, partly derived from Nielsen, infuse the tonal workings of Simpson's own early symphonies and quartets.

A significant earlier example of the use of 'progressive tonality' by a British composer is the First Symphony (The Gothic) by Havergal Brian. This huge six-movement, two-part work begins with a sonata movement in D minor whose second-subject area is initially D♭, becoming C♯; this moves to E in the matching portion of the recapitulation. This is a harbinger of E's later importance. Part I of the symphony closes in D major (end of movement 3), and Part II begins there, but during movement 4 the tonality shifts to E major, which for the remainder of Part II is opposed by its relative minor C♯ until the unequivocal E major of the final a cappella bars.

One notable comment about this subject was made by the American 20th-century composer Charles Ives. Looking back at the conservative musical establishment who would often insist a musical piece had to eventually return to its original key, Ives drew an analogy and stated to the effect that this made as much sense as being born and dying in the same place.

"Dramatic key symbolism" is another term used to indicate directional tonality.

== Examples of compositions exhibiting progressive tonality ==
- Bach: St Matthew Passion (e-c)
- Amy Beach: Variations on Balkan Themes (1936 revision)
- Brahms: Schicksalslied (1871)
- Handel: Messiah (e-D)
- Liszt: Hungarian Rhapsody No. 1 (c♯-E), No. 6 (D♭-B♭)
- Mahler: 2nd (1895, c-E♭), 4th (1900, G-E), 5th (1902, c♯-D), 7th (1905, e-C), and 9th (1909, D-D♭) Symphonies
- Carl Nielsen: Symphony No. 1, op.7 (g-C) (1892)
- Schumann: String Quartet in A minor, op.41 no.1, i (a-F) (1842)
- Ravel: Sonata for Violin and Cello (a-C) (1922)

== Bibliography ==
- George, Graham (1970). Tonality and Musical Structure. London.
- MacDonald, Malcolm (1974). The Symphonies of Havergal Brian Volume I: Symphonies 1-12. London.
- Newlin, Dika (1978). Bruckner, Mahler, Schoenberg (rev. ed.). New York.
- Simpson, Robert (1979) [1952]. Carl Nielsen, Symphonist (rev. ed.). London.
