= Symphony No. 3 (Nielsen) =

Symphony by the Danish composer Carl Nielsen

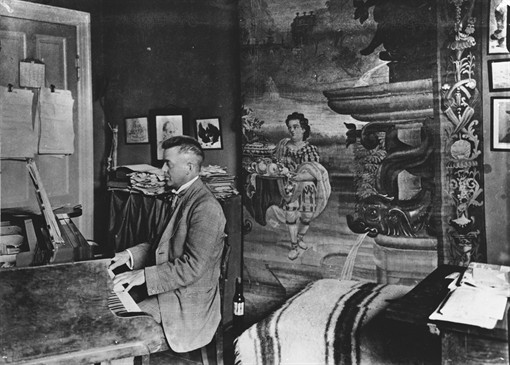
Nielsen's workroom on Vodroffsvej where he completed the Sinfonia Espansiva in 1911

The Danish composer Carl Nielsen wrote his Symphony No. 3 "Sinfonia Espansiva", Op. 27, FS 60, between 1910 and 1911. Around 35 minutes in length, it is unique in his symphonic output for having vocal parts, specifically wordless solos for soprano and baritone in the second movement.

The symphony followed Nielsen's tenure as bandmaster at the Royal Danish Opera in Copenhagen. Nielsen himself conducted the premiere of the work, along with the premiere of his Violin Concerto, on February 28, 1912 with Copenhagen's Royal Danish Orchestra.

Within two months of its premiere the symphony was in the repertoire of the Royal Concertgebouw Orchestra in Amsterdam, and by 1913 it had seen performances in Germany (Stuttgart), Sweden (Stockholm) and in Finland (Helsinki). It did not receive a public performance in the United Kingdom until 1962, under Bryan Fairfax.

== Composition ==
In an interview Nielsen gave to the Nationaltidende newspaper in 1918, he said that:

Det kan hænde, at et Tema melder sig fuldt færdigt. Saaledes husker jeg, at Hovedtemaet til et af mine større Arbejder kom til mig en Dag, jeg stod bag paa en Sporvogn. Og det kom med saa stor Paatrængenhed, at jeg i en Fart maatte kradse det ned dels paa en Lap Papir, jeg havde i Lommen, dels paa min ene Manchet.
Sometimes, a theme can come to me fully formed. I remember, for instance, that the main theme for one of my larger works came to me one day while I was standing on the back of a tram. And it came with such urgency that I had to quickly jot it down partly on a scrap of paper I had in my pocket and partly on one of my cuffs.

— "Hvorledes man bærer sig ad med at komponere", Carl Nielsen

It is not known what work Nielsen was alluding to with "one of my larger works", but it is claimed to be his 3rd Symphony, Espansiva.

=== I. Allegro espansivo ===
The character designation of the first movement (Allegro espansivo) serves as the symphony's subtitle, but it is not clear what Nielsen meant by 'espansiva'. Composer Robert Simpson wrote that it suggests the "outward growth of the mind's scope". Nielsen himself wrote of the first movement that it 'begins with some strong unisono jerks which gradually take on rhythmic form until the following subject, as if under great pressure, breaks out'. (Danish: "begynder med nogle stærke unisone Ryk som efterhaanden antager rytmisk Form indtil følgende Tema, ligesom ved et voldsomt pres, springer frem"). He worked on this first movement until 13 April 1910.

=== IV. Allegro expanso ===
The theme of the fourth movement of Carl Nielsen's Symphony No. 3 is not directly based on a known folk song, although it does possess a strong, energetic, and almost "folk-like" character that reflects a celebration of life and work, which is considered the movement's overall theme; it's more about capturing a feeling of Danish folk spirit rather than directly quoting a specific folk melody.

== Score and publishing ==
The symphony was published by C.F. Kahnt Nachfolger in Leipzig in 1913, and it was also published in the Carl-Nielsen Edition. Nielsen had sent the original manuscript to the publishing house in Leipzig in 1913. The publishing house closed during the GDR period and moved to West Germany. At some point, the publisher's materials were packed up and stored in a basement in Leipzig until they were found in 1977 and sent to the Saxon State Archive. Here, the manuscript was identified by Knud Martner, but the information did not get passed on. In 2000, the manuscript came to attention again. Until then, Carl Nielsen experts had believed that the original copy of the manuscript had been lost during World War II.

Nielsen received 5,000 marks (1,100$ USD at the time) for publishing rights by C.F. Kahnt, Leipzig, a sum significantly higher than he usually received from his publishers.

== Recordings ==
It was the first of Nielsen's symphonies to be commercially released on record, with Erik Tuxen conducting the Danish Radio Symphony Orchestra. Notably the symphony was recorded by the Royal Danish Orchestra in 1965 with Leonard Bernstein as conductor.

Between 2022 and 2023 Deutsche Grammophon released 3 CD's each containing 2 of Nielsen's symphonies. Releasing all 6 symphonies in April 2023 with the Danish National Symphony Orchestra with Fabio Luisi conducting. Other orchestra's such as the New York Philharmonic, London Symphony Orchestra and the Vienna Philharmonic have also recorded the symphony.

== Movements ==
1. Allegro espansivo
2. Andante pastorale
3. Allegretto un poco
4. Finale: Allegro

== Instrumentation ==
- 3 flutes, 3rd flute doubles piccolo
- 3 oboes, 3rd oboe doubles English horn
- 3 clarinets in A and B♭
- 3 bassoons, 3rd bassoon doubles contrabassoon
- 4 French horns in F
- 3 trumpets in F
- 3 trombones (2 tenor, 1 bass)
- Tuba
- Timpani
- Soprano solo, 2nd movement only (replaceable by 4th clarinet)
- Baritone solo, 2nd movement only (replaceable by 4th trombone)
- Strings

== Sources ==
Books

- Simpson, Robert (1952). Carl Nielsen, Symphonist, 1865–1931 (1st ed.). London: J. M. Dent. ASIN B0000CIDKO. See pages 105–123. Reprinted by Hyperion Press ISBN 978-0-88355-715-0.
  - Meyer, Torben (1952). "Appendix I: Biographical". Carl Nielsen, Symphonist, 1865–1931. Translated by Harald Knudsen. pp. 183–211. in Simpson 1952.
- Simpson, Robert (1979). Carl Nielsen, Symphonist (2nd ed.). London: Kahn & Averill. ISBN 978-0-900707-46-9. See pages 112–136.
  - Meyer, Torben (1979). "Appendix I: A Biographical Sketch". Carl Nielsen, Symphonist. Translated by Harald Knudsen. pp. 225–250. In Simpson 1979.

Scores

- Symphony No. 3 (Nielsen): Scores at the International Music Score Library Project
