= Tre Klaverstykker =

- Piano pieces by Carl Nielsen
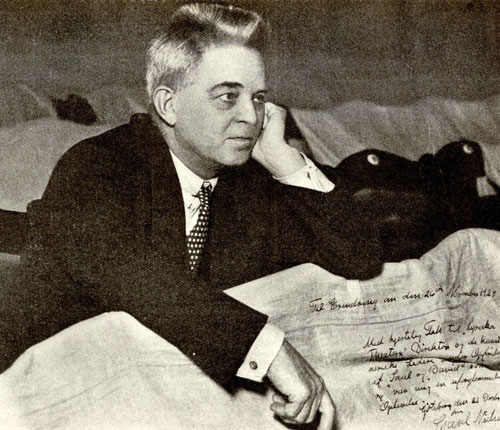
- The composer in 1928
- Catalogue: FS 131
- Opus: 59
- Composed: 1928
- Published: 1937

Tre Klaverstykker (Three Piano Pieces), FS 131, Op. 59, is a sequence of three pieces for solo piano by Carl Nielsen. Among the composer's last works, they were published in 1937 in Copenhagen.

== History ==
Nielsen composed the first two movements in January and February 1928, dating the second 1 March 1928. He turned then to the composition of the Clarinet Concerto, and finished the third piano movement on 6 November 1928. The first two pieces were initially performed in April 1928. The three pieces were published after his death in 1937 by Edition Dania in Copenhagen.

== Structure and music ==
The three pieces are marked:

1. Impromptu: Allegro fluento
2. Adagio
3. Allegro non troppo

The beginning is reminiscent of Impressionism, but moves to "more abrupt and dissonant material", according to the musicologist Chris Morrison. Nielsen commented on the last pages: "Think of a tipsy fellow trying to keep his dignity and upright position by holding on to a lamp-post!" Morrison writes that the Adagio shows "sudden outbursts" in mostly "tender and haunting music". In the last movement, which he describes as "tough-minded, forceful", Nielsen at times approaches atonality. The pieces are related to the music of Bartók and Schönberg's early twelve-tone music. The musicologist Daniel Grimley notes that the pieces convey a "dual sense of childlike innocence and devilish improvisation".

== Selected recordings ==
The pieces have been recorded in collections of Nielsen's works, such as a 1980 recording by pianist Elisabeth Westenholz, Carl Nielsen: The Complete Piano Music, a 1996 album Carl Nielsen / Keyboard works", and a 2008 collection Carl Nielsen: Complete Piano Music with pianist Martin Roscoe. Mina Miller played them on a 2007 recording of piano music by Nielsen.

== Sources ==
- 3 Klaverstykker, Op.59: Scores at the International Music Score Library Project
