= Einar Christiansen =

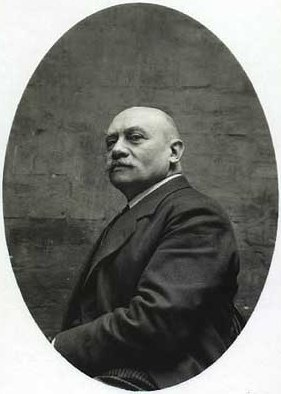
Einar Christiansen

Arne Einar Christiansen (20 July 1861 – 25 September 1939) was a Danish journalist, critic and titular professor. He was best known as a writer and theatre director.

He was born in Copenhagen, the son of Captain Eduard Christiansen and Karen Margrethe White. He graduated from the Metropolitan School in 1878 and studied theology at the University of Copenhagen graduating with his degree in 1886.

He was editor of the journal Illustreret Tidende (Illustrated Times) from 1892 to 1899. From 1899 to 1909 Christiansen was the artistic director of the Royal Danish Theatre and orchestra. Between 1912 and 1924 he served as co-director of the Folketeatret (People's Theatre). He wrote two librettos and numerous novels and plays.

He was awarded a Knight of the Order of Dannebrog in 1903 and became a Man of Honor of the Dannebrog in 1922. In 1909 he became titular professor.

He died in Copenhagen and is buried at Hellebæk Cemetery.
