= Morten Børup =

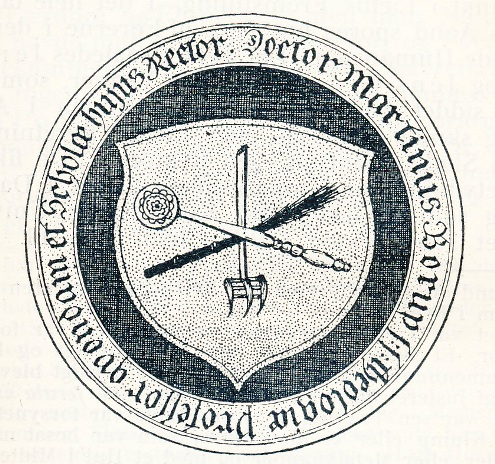
Morten Børup's crest, copied from his tombstone

Morten Børup (1446–1526) was a Danish educator, cathedral cantor and Latin poet.

== Early life and education ==
Born in Skanderborg, he first worked as a farm labourer, suffering considerable abuse. When he was 27 he fled to Aarhus, where he managed to enter the cathedral school. Supported by his teachers and by Archdean Morten Krabbe, he attended the newly founded Copenhagen University where he graduated in theology. Børup continuing his studies at the University of Cologne after that in 1487, receiving a doctorate.

== Career ==
On returning to Denmark, he became principal of the Aarhus cathedral school around 1490, where he gained an excellent reputation. He remained school principal until 1520. Among his students, were the Lutheran reformers Jørgen Sadolin and Hans Tausen. Børup wrote a number of Latin plays for the benefit of his students and they are among the first publicly performed plays in Denmark (1501). He is also said to have composed a choral dance (dåredansen), which was performed over 50 years after his death for the christening of Christian IV. In later life, he became the cantor of Aarhus Cathedral, managing all the church music and probably composing hymns and poetry in Latin. One of his best known works is Carmen vernale (Spring Song) written for his school's annual May festival. The work was adopted by many other schools in both Denmark and Sweden and later inspired various composers, including Carl Nielsen.
