= Emil Bønnelycke =

Danish poet, novelist

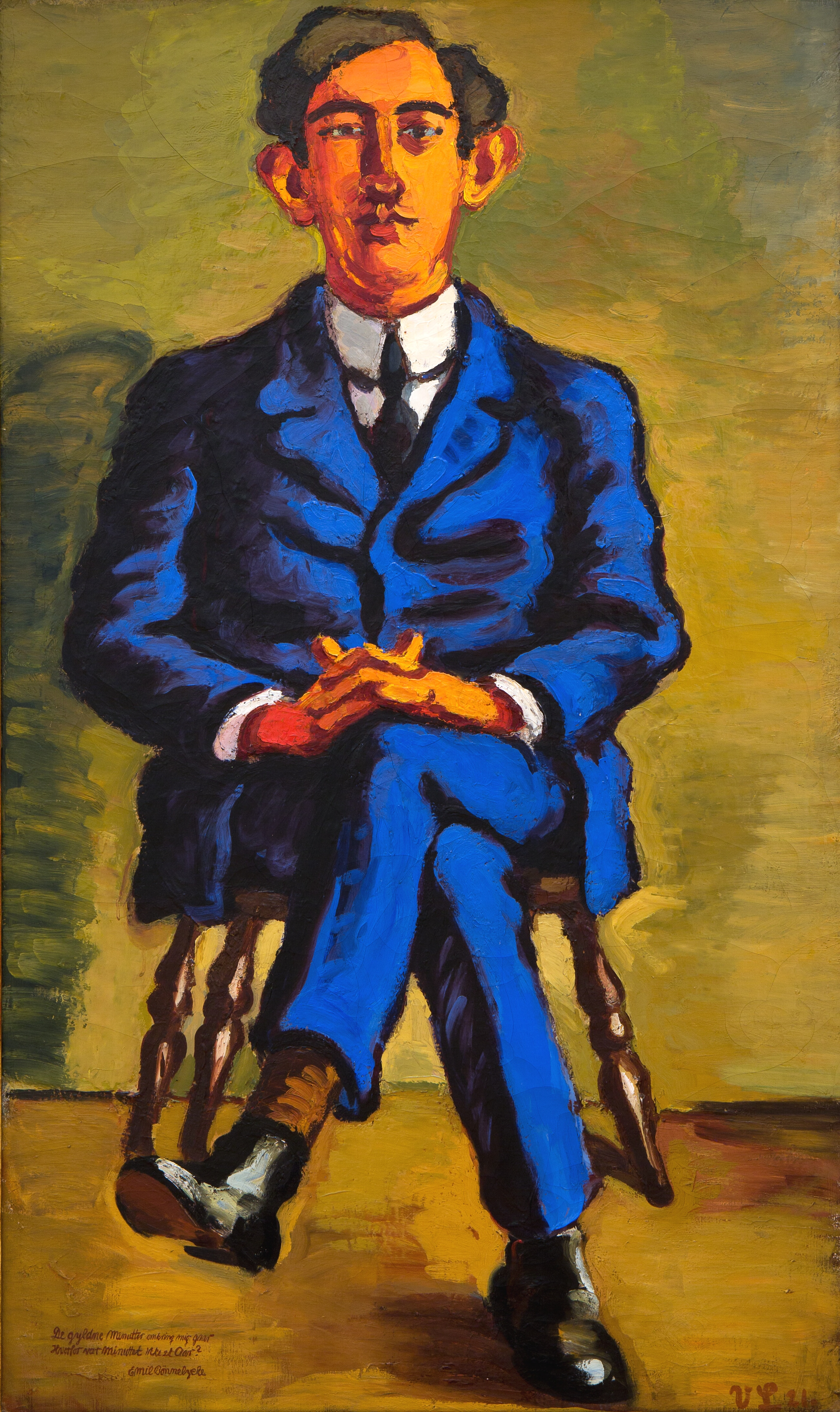
Emil Bønnelycke

Emil Christian Theodor Bønnelycke (21 March 1893 – 27 November 1953) was a Danish poet. Born in Aarhus, he was brought up in Copenhagen but as a young man also lived in Norway. Having worked as a clerk, scaffolding worker, and bricklayer's assistant, he focused on writing from 1919. He had his debut in 1917 with a collection of poems called Ild og Ungdom (Youth and Fire), written while he was living in Kristiania.

A prolific writer of poetry, novels, plays and short stories, Bønnelycke is remembered in particular for his futuristic poem, Aarhundredet (The Century) from 1918 and his Københavnske Poesier (Copenhagen Poems), in praise of the city, which brought him a wide, appreciative readership. He is also remembered, however, for firing blank cartridges after having read an acclamatory poem in honour of Rosa Luxemburg at Politikens Hus.

He died in Söndrum, near Halmstad, Sweden in 1953 and was buried at Vestre Kirkegård in Copenhagen.
