= Symphony No. 4 (Nielsen) =

1916 symphony by Carl Nielsen

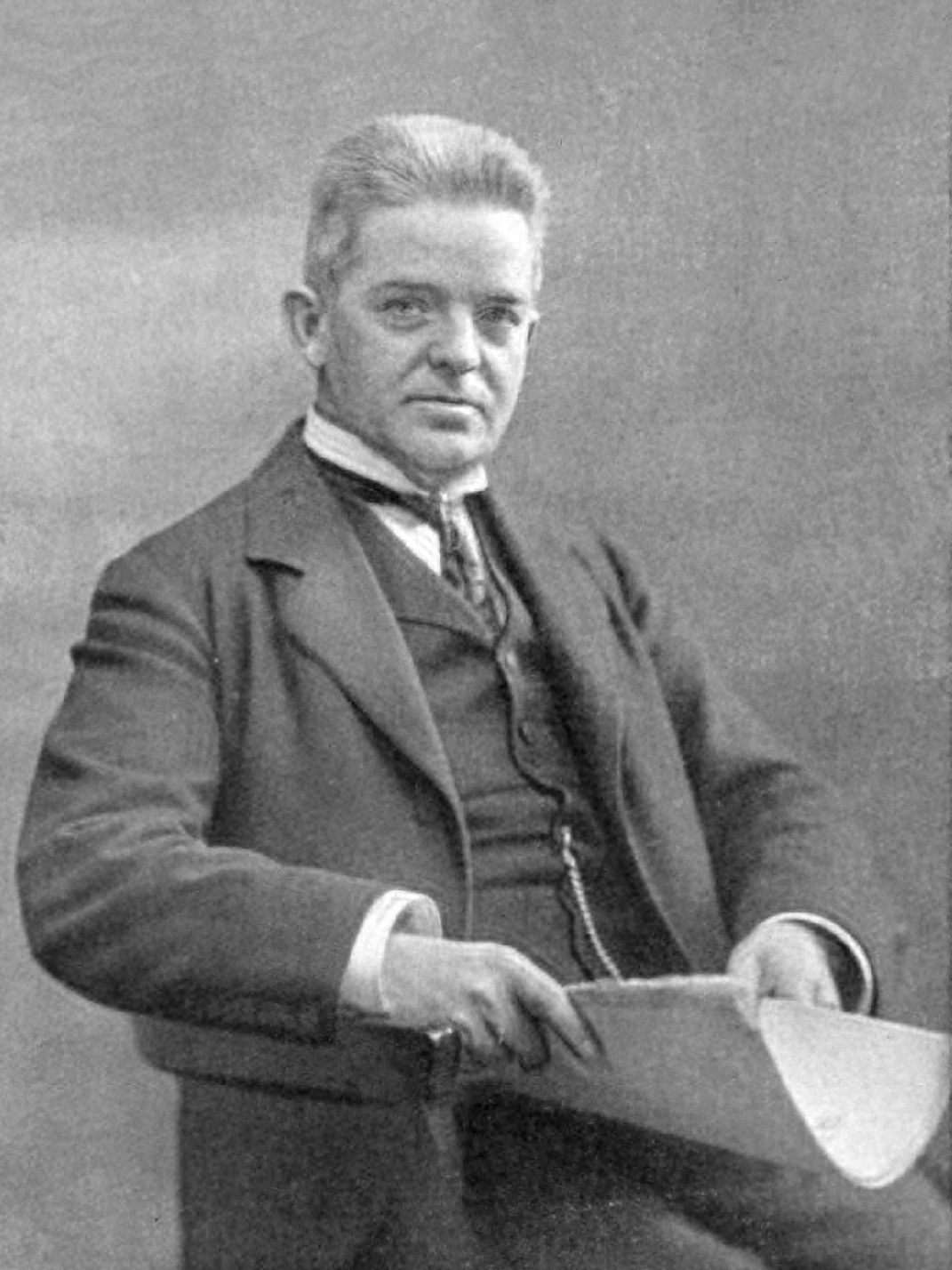
Carl Nielsen in 1917

Symphony No. 4, Op. 29, FS 76, also known as "The Inextinguishable" (Danish: Det Uudslukkelige), was completed by Danish composer Carl Nielsen in 1916. Composed against the backdrop of World War I, this symphony is among the most dramatic that Nielsen wrote, featuring a "battle" between two sets of timpani.

== Origin ==
Nielsen was thinking about a new symphony in 1914, and in May he wrote to his wife (who was in Celle):

I have an idea for a new composition, which has no programme but will express what we understand by the spirit of life or manifestations of life, that is: everything that moves, that wants to live ... just life and motion, though varied – very varied – yet connected, and as if constantly on the move, in one big movement or stream. I must have a word or a short title to express this; that will be enough. I cannot quite explain what I want, but what I want is good.

Nielsen concentrated on this until 1916, and named his 4th symphony "The Inextinguishable" (Det Uudslukkelige). The name does not apply to the symphony itself, but rather to "that which is inextinguishable". In his notes for the symphony, Nielsen refers to "the elemental will to live".

== Form ==
The symphony is scored for 3 flutes (one doubling piccolo), 3 oboes, 3 clarinets, 3 bassoons (one doubling contrabassoon), 4 horns in F, 3 trumpets in C, 3 trombones, tuba, 2 sets of timpani, and strings.

The symphony's four movements are played without breaks – attacca subito (literally "join quickly; suddenly"). The first movement begins with a fierce tutti pitting D minor against its flat seventh, C, in an almost antiphonal manner. After the tutti, the clarinets introduce in A major the lyrical theme that will culminate the work. The second movement, for woodwind in G major, is more an intermezzo than the expected adagio. That function is fulfilled by the third movement, which opens with a cantilena from unison violins, then builds to a climax before concluding with a single oboe playing over trills in the upper strings. The clashes of the first movement reappear in the final movement, in which two sets of timpani duel from either side of the orchestra. This passage calls on the two timpanists to change the pitch of the timpani while playing. At the very end E major emerges as the key to conclude the work.

The most recorded of Nielsen's symphonies, No. 4 presents some unique problems to the interpreter. In the revised version of his analysis, Robert Simpson devotes nearly a page to "features that can lead the exhibitionist conductor astray", mostly relating to matters of tempo.

The contrabassoon (played by the third bassoonist) has only one note to play in the symphony: the single, held note is a written B2 (the second line of the staff for contrabassoon, sounding an octave lower) and opens the coda of the fourth movement accompanied by timpani. The remainder of the third bassoon part, in contrast, occupies the player with many notes.

=== Movements ===
1. Allegro –
2. Poco allegretto –
3. Poco adagio quasi andante –
4. Allegro

== Discography ==
Notable recordings include:

- Danish National Radio Symphony Orchestra / Thomas Jensen (Danacord)
- Danish National Radio Symphony Orchestra / Launy Grøndahl (Dutton)
- Danish National Radio Symphony Orchestra / Michael Schønwandt (Dacapo)
- Royal Stockholm Philharmonic Orchestra / Sakari Oramo (BIS, 2013)
- Royal Danish Orchestra / Igor Markevitch (Deutsche Grammophon)
- Chicago Symphony Orchestra / Jean Martinon (RCA)
- San Francisco Symphony / Herbert Blomstedt (Decca)
- Royal Scottish National Orchestra / Sir Alexander Gibson (Chandos)
- Royal Scottish National Orchestra / Bryden Thomson (Chandos)
- Hallé Orchestra / Sir John Barbirolli (D Classics; EMI)
- Berlin Philharmonic / Herbert von Karajan (Deutsche Grammophon, 1982)
- Swedish Radio Symphony Orchestra / Esa-Pekka Salonen / (Sony Classical, 1986 & 2016)
- Göteborg Symphony Orchestra / Neeme Järvi (Deutsche Grammophon, 2011)
- New York Philharmonic / Leonard Bernstein (Sony Classical)
- Los Angeles Philharmonic Orchestra / Zubin Mehta (Decca)
- Bergen Philharmonic Orchestra / Edward Gardner (Chandos, 2023)

== Performances today ==
On the basis of information from the Carl Nielsen Society, Symphony No. 4 is one of Nielsen's most widely performed works.
