= Symphony No. 5 (Nielsen) =

Symphony composed by Carl Nielsen

- by Carl Nielsen
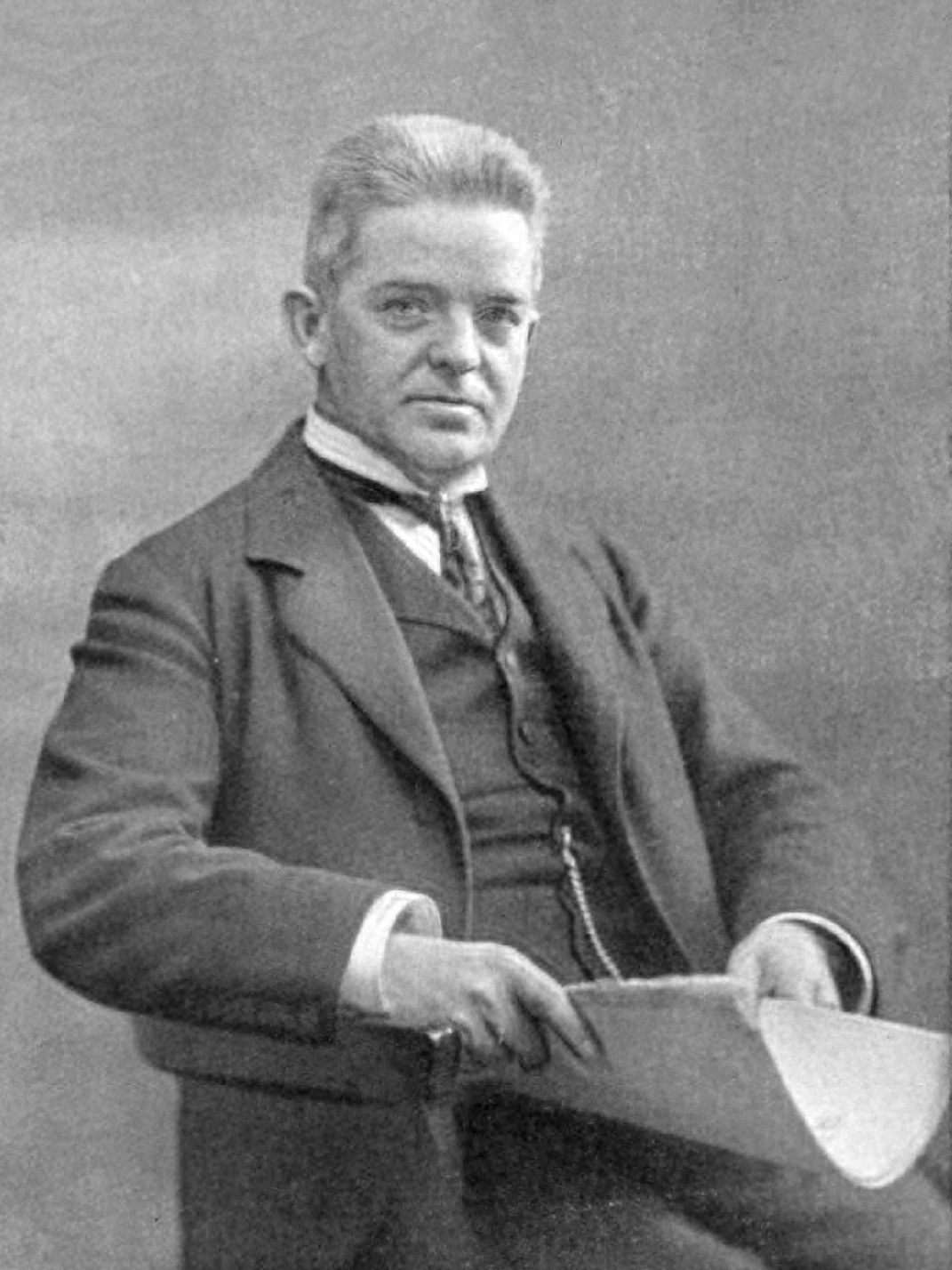
- The composer in 1917
- Catalogue: FS 97
- Opus: 50

Premiere
- Date: 24 January 1922

Symphony No. 5, Op. 50, FS 97 is a symphony composed by Carl Nielsen in Denmark between 1920 and 1922. It was first performed in Copenhagen on 24 January 1922 with the composer conducting. It is one of two of Nielsen's six symphonies lacking a subtitle, the other being his Symphony No. 1.

The Fifth Symphony has a non-customary structure, comprising two movements instead of the common three or four. Written in a modern musical language, it draws on the theme of contrast and opposition. The post-World War I composition is also described as having elements of war.

== Composition ==
There is no documentation of what inspired Nielsen to write his Fifth Symphony or when he started to write it, but it is generally understood that the first movement was composed in Humlebæk during the winter and spring of 1921. He stayed at his summer house at Skagen in the early summer. At the end of July he moved to a friend's home at Damgaard to compose the cantata Springtime on Funen, and was therefore only able to resume working on the second movement of the symphony in September, during his free time from his conducting work in Gothenburg.

The whole symphony was finished on 15 January 1922, as dated on the score. He dedicated the new symphony to his friends Vera and Carl Johan Michaelsen. Having insufficient rehearsal time, the premiere took place only nine days later, conducted by the composer himself at the music society Musikforening in Copenhagen.

== Score ==
A work from the early 20th century, the Fifth Symphony is regarded as a modernistic musical piece. The symphony draws on all of the "deformation procedures" suggested by James Hepokoski regarding musical modernism: breakthrough deformation, introduction-coda frame, episodes within developmental space, various strophic/sonata hybrids and multi-movement forms in a single movement. Its fragmented nature, unpredictable character and sudden synchronization at the ending also point towards a self-conscious modernist aesthetic, though as in most of Nielsen's early and middle works, non-modernist devices, including organicism and diatonicism, play some essential roles.

As written in the original 1926 edition of the score, the Fifth Symphony is scored for 3 flutes (third doubling piccolo), 2 oboes, 2 clarinets, 2 bassoons, 4 horns, 3 trumpets, 3 trombones, tuba, timpani, cymbals, triangle, tambourine, snare drum, celesta, and strings. Some optional doublings are added in the 1950 edition of the score revised by Emil Telmányi and Erik Tuxen; these include the third flute doubling flute in G and the second bassoon doubling contrabassoon. These optional doublings are discarded in the latest 1998 Carl Nielsen Edition score, which was produced as a co-operation between the Danish Royal Library and Edition Wilhelm Hansen.

The Fifth Symphony has two movements instead of the usual four, which is the only time Nielsen used this structure. Nielsen explained jokingly in an interview that it was not difficult to write the first three movements of a symphony but by the finale most composers had run out of ideas. The work has a craggy profile as "it is littered with false climaxes at every turn". The first movement climaxes in a battle between the orchestra and a renegade snare-drummer, who can only be silenced by the full forces of his colleagues in the final bars. The second movement continues the struggle with shivers of anxiety, building through repetitions and detours to the final victorious grand explosion.

=== I. Tempo giusto – Adagio non troppo ===
The opening of the Tempo giusto section of the first movement

The first movement begins with violas softly oscillating between the C and A notes; after four bars of the single, minimally-inflected line, a pair of bassoons enters with the initial theme. The beginning has been described by Nielsen scholar Robert Simpson as like being "in outer space"; the subsequent wave-like line "appears from nowhere, as if one were suddenly made aware of time as a dimension". The very first theme ends at b. 20 with a descending scale, followed by a fortissimo interruption from violas and a subsequent horn and flute dialogue. The prominent feature of instrumental pairing does not lead to any permanent thematic or textural stability, but contrarily grows into a persistent textural sparseness.

After an emotionless string passage which encloses another brief warning from violas, woodwinds cry out amid a percussive background. While the monotonous rhythm of snare drum continues, violins respond tortuously, only to be overwhelmed by the mood of the "savage and destructively egotistical" (Simpson's description) clarinet and flute. The turmoil continues as the bass struggles to rise from the tonic (C) to the dominant (G), invoking a new clash with the percussion; the attempt at struggle fails as the bass is foiled at G♭ when the ominous violin melody is distorted and disintegrates. The huge incongruity between harmonic and melodic parameters threatens the music with fracture and collapse. After gloomy phrases from various woodwinds, the music fades, leaving a feebly pulsing D with tiny hints of percussion sounds.

The opening of the Adagio non troppo section of the first movement

An oboe triplet figure then reveals the warm theme in G major of the Adagio non troppo section, a contrast to the prior cold landscape. The texture expands contrapuntally for the first time; the tonality brightens to B major and, after a climax, wanes to G major again. The full strings are soon disturbed by an "evil" motif on woodwinds, playing the shivering element from the work's opening; tension between wind and strings intensifies as tonality shifts within instrumental groups in their respective directions. With a further clash, the music is menaced by the snare drum at a tempo (quarter note ♩=116) faster than that of the orchestra, and at its climax comes the composer's instruction to the snare drummer to improvise "as if at all costs he wants to stop the progress of the orchestra". (This instruction is not included in the 1950 edition of the score, being replaced by a written rhythmic line and instruction "cad. ad lib." after a few bars.) The warm theme eventually triumphs in a sustaining grandeur, as is affirmed by the snare drum actually joining the orchestral fanfare. When all subsides, echoes in woodwinds are heard and a solitary clarinet is left to mourn in a tragic atmosphere, recapturing ideas from the whole movement: "Who would have thought that so much could have come out of a gently waving viola line in empty space?"

=== II. Allegro – Presto – Andante un poco tranquillo – Allegro ===
The opening theme on 1st violin of the second movement

The second movement in four sections consists of an "exposition", a fast fugue, a slow fugue and a brief coda. The music bursts in (in B major, despite the A major key-signature), and continues with great conflicts between instruments, until a broad, calm theme is found in the slow fugue. At the close it pivots on B♭, the dominant of E♭ major; various elements collide and “fall together” into an uplifting 23-bar conclusion.

This movement was portrayed by Robert Simpson as arising from the ashes and ruins left by the conflict in the first movement. In the first edition of his book he expressed hesitation over analysing this part, feeling that it either requires a very deep analysis, or should be described in the fewest possible words. Jack Lawson, founder and president of The Carl Nielsen Society of Great Britain, commented that in the second movement, the listener "inhabits a world reborn, at first calm but a world which produces new struggles and menacing dangers" and "transports the listener through the depths or above the heights of more standard musical perceptions".

== Interpretation ==
Though the Fifth Symphony bears no title, Nielsen affirmed that, like his previous symphonies, it presents "the only thing that music in the end can express: resting forces in contrast to active ones". In a statement to one of his students, Ludvig Dolleris, Nielsen described the symphony as "the division of dark and light, the battle between evil and good" and the opposition between "Dreams and Deeds". To Hugo Seligman he described the contrast between "vegetative" and "active" states of mind in the symphony. The symphony is widely stated to be a work about contrast and opposition.

The "evil" motif as it first appears in the Adagio non troppo section in the first movement. The motif borrows materials from the Tempo giusto section.

The composer asserted that he was not conscious of the influence of World War I when he was composing the symphony, but added that "not one of us is the same as we were before the war". Simon Rattle also described the Fifth Symphony, rather than the Fourth as proclaimed by the composer, as being Nielsen's war symphony. In fact, the phrase "dark, resting forces, alert forces" can be found on the back cover of the pencil draft score. Nielsen may have considered it an encapsulation of the contrast both between and within the two movements of the symphony. Nielsen also wrote to Dolleris about the presence of the "evil" motif in the first movement of the symphony:

Then the "evil" motif intervenes – in the woodwind and strings – and the side drum becomes more and more angry and aggressive; but the nature-theme grows on, peaceful and unaffected, in the brass. Finally the evil has to give way, a last attempt and then it flees – and with a strophe thereafter in consoling major mode a solo clarinet ends this large idyll-movement, an expression of vegetative (idle, thoughtless) Nature.

Although Nielsen asserted that the symphony is non-programmatic, he once expressed his views on it thus:

I'm rolling a stone up a hill, I'm using the powers in me to bring the stone to the top. The stone lies there so still, powers are wrapped in it, until I give it a kick and the same powers are released and the stone rolls down again. But you mustn't take that as a programme!

== Reception ==
The immediate reception of the press to the symphony was generally positive, especially the first movement. Axel Kjerulf wrote that in the Adagio section, he heard a Dream giving way to a "Dream about Deeds... Carl Nielsen has maybe never written more powerful, beautiful, fundamentally healthy and genuine music than here." However, critics were more hesitant towards the second movement. In August Felsing's review, he commented that "Intellectual art is what the second part is, and it is a master who speaks. But the pact with the eternal in art which shines forth in the first part is broken here." Musicians' opinions were divided. Victor Bendix, a long-time supporter and friend, wrote to Nielsen the day after the premiere, calling the work a "Sinfonie filmatique, this dirty trenches-music, this impudent fraud, this clenched fist in the face of a defenceless, novelty-snobbish, titillation-sick public, commonplace people en masse, who lovingly lick the hand stained with their own noses' blood!"

A Swedish performance on 20 January 1924, under the baton of Georg Schnéevoigt, caused quite a scandal; the Berlingske Tidende reported that some in the audience could not take the modernism of the work:

Midway through the first part with its rattling drums and 'cacophonous' effects a genuine panic broke out. Around a quarter of the audience rushed for the exits with confusion and anger written over their faces, and those who remained tried to hiss down the 'spectacle', while the conductor Georg Schnéevoigt drove the orchestra to extremes of volume. This whole intermezzo underlined the humoristic-burlesque element in the symphony in such a way that Carl Nielsen could certainly never have dreamed of. His representation of modern life with its confusion, brutality and struggle, all the uncontrolled shouts of pain and ignorance—and behind it all the side drum's harsh rhythm as the only disciplining force—as the public fled, made a touch of almost diabolic humour.

For decades, Nielsen's music did not win recognition outside Denmark. The first recording was in 1933: Georg Høeberg with the Danish Radio Symphony Orchestra for Dancord. The first live recording was produced in 1950 with Erik Tuxen conducting the same orchestra at the Edinburgh Festival. An international breakthrough was made only when Leonard Bernstein recorded the symphony with the New York Philharmonic in 1962 for CBS. This recording helped Nielsen's music to achieve appreciation beyond his home country, and is considered one of the finest recorded accounts of the symphony.
