= Pan and Syrinx =

Symphonic poem by Carl Nielsen

- Symphonic poem by Carl Nielsen
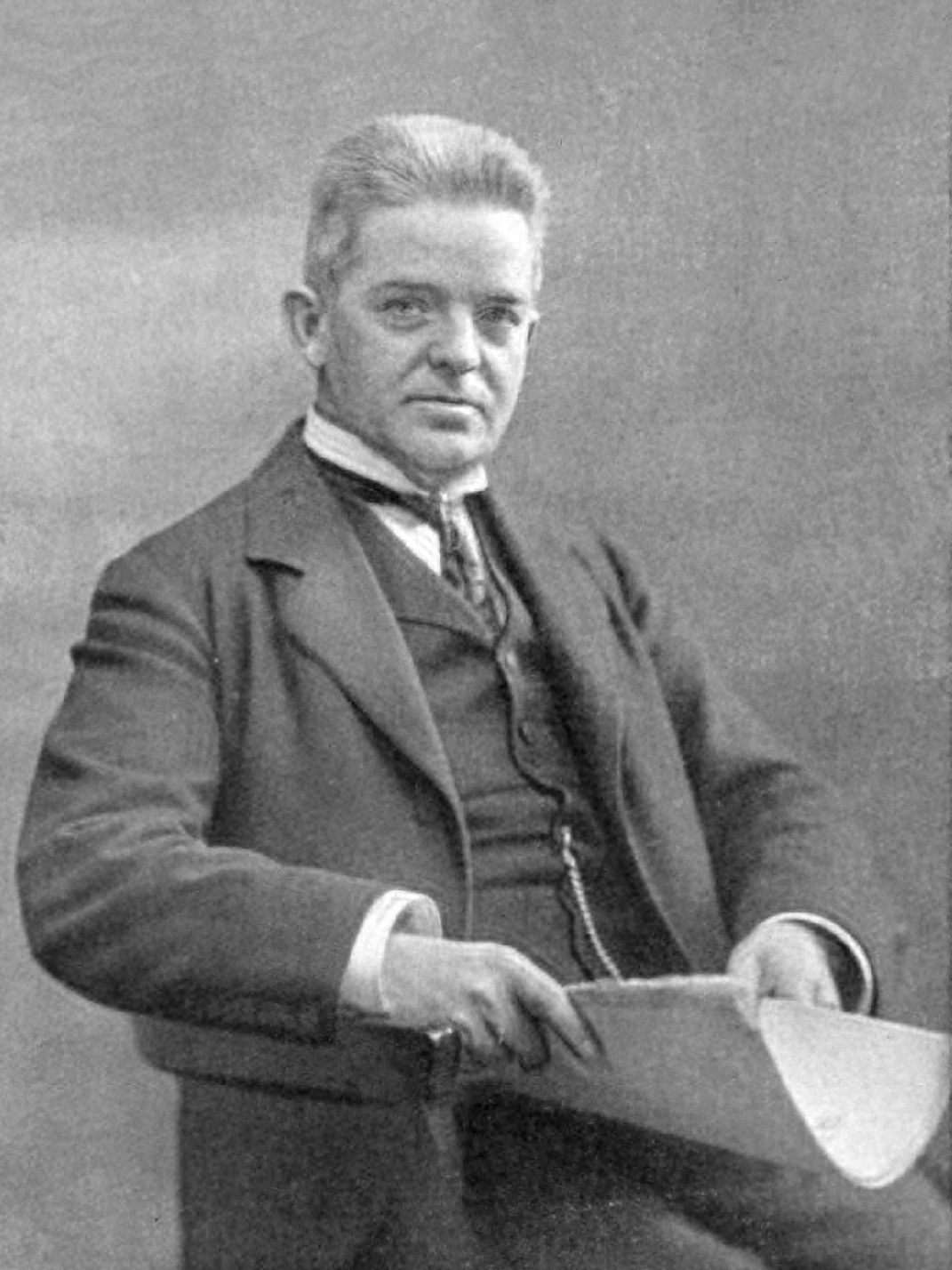
- The composer (1917)
- Native name: Pan og Syrinx
- Catalogue: FS 87; CNW 38
- Opus: 49
- Composed: 1917–1918
- Publisher: Hansen (1926)
- Duration: 8–9 mins.

Premiere
- Date: 11 February 1918
- Location: Copenhagen, Denmark
- Conductor: Carl Nielsen
- Performers: Orchestra of the Music Society

Pan and Syrinx (in Danish: Pan og Syrinx; subtitled "Pastoral Scene for Orchestra"; in Danish: "Naturscene for orkester"), Op. 49 (FS 87; CNW 38), is a symphonic poem for orchestra written from 1917 to 1918 by the Danish composer Carl Nielsen. The piece received its premiere at the Odd Fellows Mansion in Copenhagen on 11 February 1918, with Nielsen conducting Orchestra of the Music Society (Musikforeningen).

== Background ==
As late as 23 January 1918, in a letter to Swedish composer Wilhelm Stenhammar, Nielsen explained that although he had included Pan and Syrinx in his concert on 11 February, he had not yet written a single note. It appears, however, that he had been thinking about the piece for some time, ever since he and his wife Anne Marie had discussed Ovid's Metamorphoses the previous year, inspiring him to compose the music. He did however manage to complete the score by 6 February.

In addition to Pan and Syrinx, the concert which was devoted to works by Nielsen over almost 20 years, included the prelude to Act Two of Saul and David, Sleep and the Fourth Symphony, all conducted by Nielsen himself, as well as Chaconne for Piano played by Christian Christiansen.

== Reception ==
Pan and Syrinx was particularly well received. Writing in Politken, Charles Kjerulf first alluded to its "Gallic, quite Debussyesque" quality before praising its feeling of renewal, development and mastery. He ended even more gushingly: "For each note that was added it became more and more sublime. And when in the end the very highest and very lowest notes of the orchestra were sounded right up against each other in the violin harmonics and double-basses... then the rejoicing broke out quite spontaneously." The other reviews were also positive.

The work was frequently played in Scandinavia during Nielsen's lifetime. When the composer planned a concert programme, he often chose to perform Saga Dream and Pan and Syrinx on the same occasion.

== Instrumentation ==
Pan and Syrinx is scored for the following instruments, organized by family (woodwinds, brass, percussion, and strings):

- 2 flutes (one doubling piccolo), 2 oboes (one doubling cor anglais), 2 clarinets, and 2 bassoons
- 4 horns, 2 trumpets, and 2 trombones
- Timpani, bass drum, snare drum, cymbals, tambourine, triangle, raganella, glockenspiel, and xylophone
- Violins (I and II), violas, cellos, and double basses

== Music ==
The nine-minute symphonic poem is based on the ancient legend which tells how the amorous god Pan invented the pan flute when following the nymph Syrinx. Syrinx ran to the river's edge and asked for assistance from the river nymphs. In answer, she was transformed into hollow water reeds that made a haunting sound when the god's frustrated breath blew across them. Pan cut the reeds to fashion the first set of pan pipes, which were thenceforth known as syrinx.

As the piece features Syrinx it obviously has major parts for woodwind solos. The music was written at the height of Nielsen's powers as a composer, shortly after he finished the Fourth Symphony. It is a vigorous, pretty, and poetic work.

== Discography ==
The table below lists commercially available recordings of Pan and Syrinx:

No.	Conductor	Ensemble	Rec. (Note: Refers to the year in which the performers recorded the work; this may not be the same as the year in which the recording was first released to the general public.)	Time	Recording venue	Label	Ref.
1	Thomas Jensen (1)	Danish Radio Symphony Orchestra (1)	1956	7:19	Danish Radio Concert Hall	Danacord	
2	Thomas Jensen (2)	Danish Radio Symphony Orchestra (2)	1959	7:16	Danish Radio Concert Hall	Danacord	
3	Eugene Ormandy	Philadelphia Orchestra	1967	8:14	Town Hall, Philadelphia	Sony Classical	
4	Herbert Blomstedt	Danish Radio Symphony Orchestra (3)	1975	8:36	Danish Radio Concert Hall	EMI Classics	
5	Sir Alexander Gibson	Scottish National Orchestra	1979	8:43	Glasgow City Hall	Chandos	
6	Sir Simon Rattle	City of Birmingham Symphony Orchestra	1984	8:26	Warwick Arts Centre	EMI Classics	
7	Tamás Vetö	Odense Symphony Orchestra (1)	1988	8:36	Odense Concert Hall	Regis	
8	Esa-Pekka Salonen	Swedish Radio Symphony Orchestra	1989	8:30	Berwald Hall	CBS Masterworks	
9	Gennady Rozhdestvensky	Danish National Symphony Orchestra (4)	1993	8:33	Danish Radio Concert Hall	Chandos	(Note: G. Rozhdestvensky–Chandos (CHAN 9287) 1994)
10	Edward Serov	Odense Symphony Orchestra (2)	1994	9:24	[Unknown] (Note: The liner notes to this release do not contain information on the venue(s) at which the work was recorded.)	Kontrapunkt	
11	Jan Caeyers	Beethoven Academie	1994	8:08	deSingel	Harmonia Mundi	
12	Neeme Järvi	Gothenburg Symphony Orchestra	1995	8:59	Gothenburg Concert Hall	Deutsche Grammophon	
13	Niklas Willén	South Jutland Symphony Orchestra	2002	9:10	Musikhuset, Sønderborg	Naxos	
14	Lance Friedel	Aarhus Symphony Orchestra	2004	8:46	Frichsparker, Aarhus	MSR Classics	
15	Douglas Bostock	Czech Chamber Philharmonic	2005	7:28	Philharmonie, Pardubice	Classico	
16	Osmo Vänskä	Lahti Symphony Orchestra	2006	7:49	Sibelius Hall	BIS	
17	Thomas Dausgaard	Danish National Symphony Orchestra (5)	2006	8:43	Danish Radio Concert Hall	Dacapo	
18	Edward Gardner	Bergen Philharmonic Orchestra	2023	8:29	Grieg Hall	Chandos	(Note: E. Gardner–Chandos (CHSA 5312) 2024)
