= Helios Overture =

Concert overture by Carl Nielsen

- Concert overture by Carl Nielsen
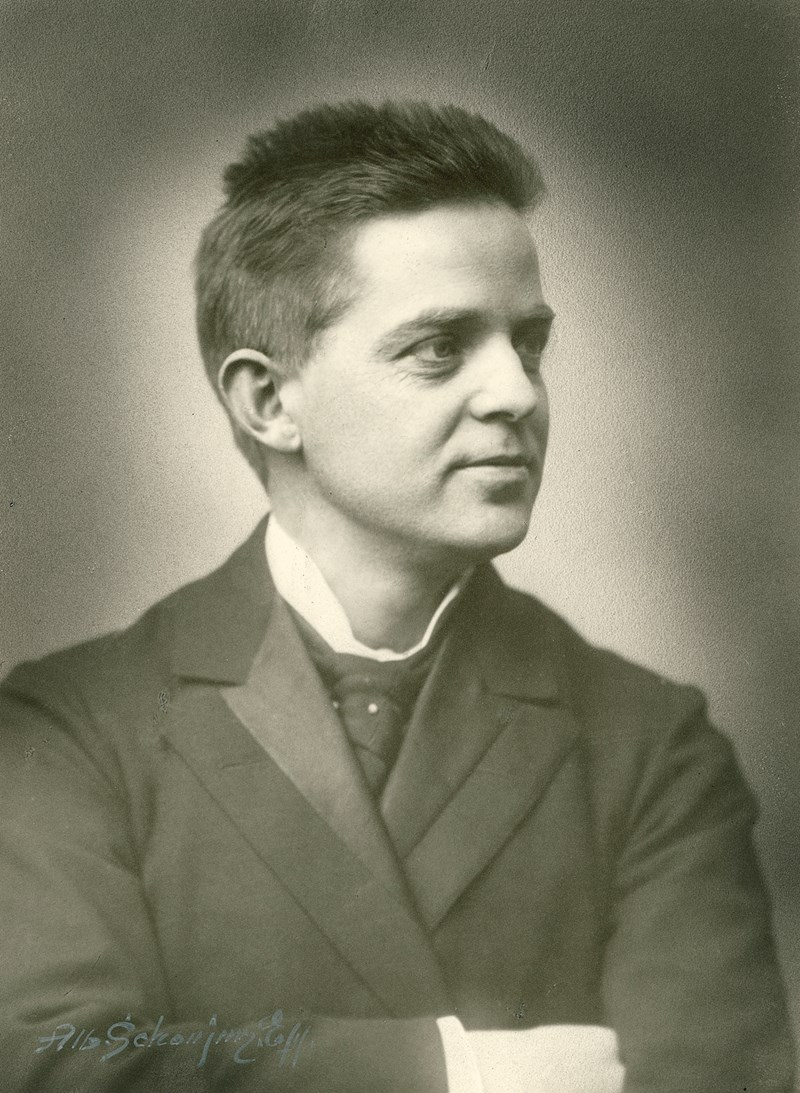
- The composer (1901)
- Native name: Ouverture Helios
- Catalogue: FS 32; CNW 34
- Opus: 17
- Composed: 1903
- Publisher: Hansen (1905)
- Duration: 8–9 mins.

Premiere
- Date: 8 October 1903
- Location: Copenhagen, Denmark
- Conductor: Johan Svendsen
- Performers: Royal Danish Orchestra

The Helios Overture (in Danish: Ouverture Helios), Op. 17 (FS 32; CNW 34), is a concert overture for orchestra written in 1903 by the Danish composer Carl Nielsen. The piece received its premiere at the Odd Fellows Mansion in Copenhagen on 8 October 1903, with Johan Svendsen conducting the Royal Danish Orchestra.

== Overview ==
Besides his well-known six symphonies, the Danish composer Carl Nielsen wrote many short orchestral works, one of the most famous being the Helios Overture. In 1902, Nielsen signed a contract with the publisher Wilhelm Hansen, which allowed him to go to Athens, Greece, to join his wife Anne Marie Carl-Nielsen, who was one of the first sculptors allowed to make copies of the bas-reliefs and statues in the Acropolis Museum.

Anne Marie, who had been granted the Ancker Award, was studying Greek art, while Nielsen, being a man of many interests, was interested in archaeology. The local conservatory placed a study room with a piano at Carl Nielsen's disposal. Here he could sit and compose when he was not on excursions in the surrounding mountains with or without Anne Marie. Nielsen's stay in Athens gave him the inspiration of a work depicting the sun rising and setting over the Aegean Sea, an overture which he called Helios. He began work on it in March 1903, and finished it on April 23 the same year.

The score is written for three flutes, two oboes, two clarinets, two bassoons, four horns, three trumpets, three trombones, tuba, timpani, and strings.

The work begins as the sun ascends over the Aegean Sea, while strings, divided horns and woodwind sound a melody. This rises out of the darkness to a full orchestra, where fanfaring French horns begin a striding theme, which returns later in the piece. From there woodwinds begin a graceful tune, from which brass sound. Strings begin to play, which draws the orchestra into a reprise of the striding theme and its fanfare. In the final measures, the music subsides as the sun sinks over the horizon of the sea. The average playing time is between ten and twelve minutes.

On the score, Nielsen wrote:

"Silence and darkness,
The sun rises with a joyous song of praise,
It wanders its golden way
and sinks quietly into the sea."

After a trip to Turkey, Carl and Anne Marie Nielsen traveled through Italy and reached Copenhagen by the end of July. The Helios Overture was successfully performed in Copenhagen on 8 October 1903, with Johan Svendsen conducting, though the reviews were mixed. Carl Nielsen performed Helios several times. The first was an evening concert dedicated to his compositions at the Odd Fellow Mansion on 11 November 1905 and the last performance was on 12 February 1930 in Gothenburg, Sweden. He also played the overture in Helsinki, Stockholm and Berlin.

Being a great showpiece for orchestra, it has been one of Nielsen's most famous works ever since.

On the basis of information from the Carl Nielsen Society, the Helios Overture is currently one of Nielsen's most widely performed works.

== Instrumentation ==
The Helios Overture is scored for the following instruments, organized by family (woodwinds, brass, percussion, and strings):

- 2 flutes (one doubling piccolo), 2 oboes, 2 clarinets, and 2 bassoons
- 4 horns, 3 trumpets, 2 tenor trombones, 1 bass trombone, and tuba
- Timpani
- Violins (I and II), violas, cellos, and double basses

== Discography ==
The table below lists commercially available recordings of the Helios Overture:

No.	Conductor	Ensemble	Rec. (Note: Refers to the year in which the performers recorded the work; this may not be the same as the year in which the recording was first released to the general public.)	Time	Recording venue	Label	Ref.
1	Fritz Busch	Danish Radio Symphony Orchestra	1934	12:49	Stærekassen, Copenhagen	(live) Danacord	
2	Thomas Jensen	Royal Danish Orchestra	1942	10:57	-	Odeon - Danacord	
3	Erik Tuxen	Danish State Radio Symphony Orchestra	1952	10:50	Danish Radio Concert Hall	Decca	
4	Eugene Ormandy	Philadelphia Orchestra	1967	10:03	Town Hall, Philadelphia	Sony Classical	
5	Herbert Blomstedt	Danish Radio Symphony Orchestra (1)	1975	12:01	Danish Radio Concert Hall	EMI Classics	
6	Sir Alexander Gibson	Scottish National Orchestra	1978	11:45		Chandos	
7	Esa-Pekka Salonen	Swedish Radio Symphony Orchestra	1986	10:00	Berwald Hall	CBS Masterworks	
8	Edward Serov	Odense Symphony Orchestra	1992	14:25	[Unknown] (Note: The liner notes to this release do not contain information on the venue(s) at which the work was recorded.)	Kontrapunkt	
9	Gennady Rozhdestvensky	Danish National Symphony Orchestra (2)	1993	14:02	Danish Radio Concert Hall	Chandos	
10	Neeme Järvi	Gothenburg Symphony Orchestra	1995	9:13	Gothenburg Concert Hall	Deutsche Grammophon	
11	Douglas Bostock	Royal Liverpool Philharmonic Orchestra		12:07	Liverpool Philharmonic Hall	Classico	
12	Niklas Willén	South Jutland Symphony Orchestra	2002	9:54	Musikhuset, Sønderborg	Naxos	
13	Lance Friedel	Aarhus Symphony Orchestra	2004	12:20	Frichsparker, Aarhus	MSR Classics	
14	Dorrit Matson	New York Scandia Symphony	2005	12:50	Trinity Church	Centaur	
15	Osmo Vänskä	Lahti Symphony Orchestra	2006	10:58	Sibelius Hall	BIS	
16	Thomas Dausgaard	Danish National Symphony Orchestra (3)	2006	11:55	Danish Radio Concert Hall	Dacapo	
