= Discography of Nielsen symphony cycles =

Recordings of works by Carl Nielsen

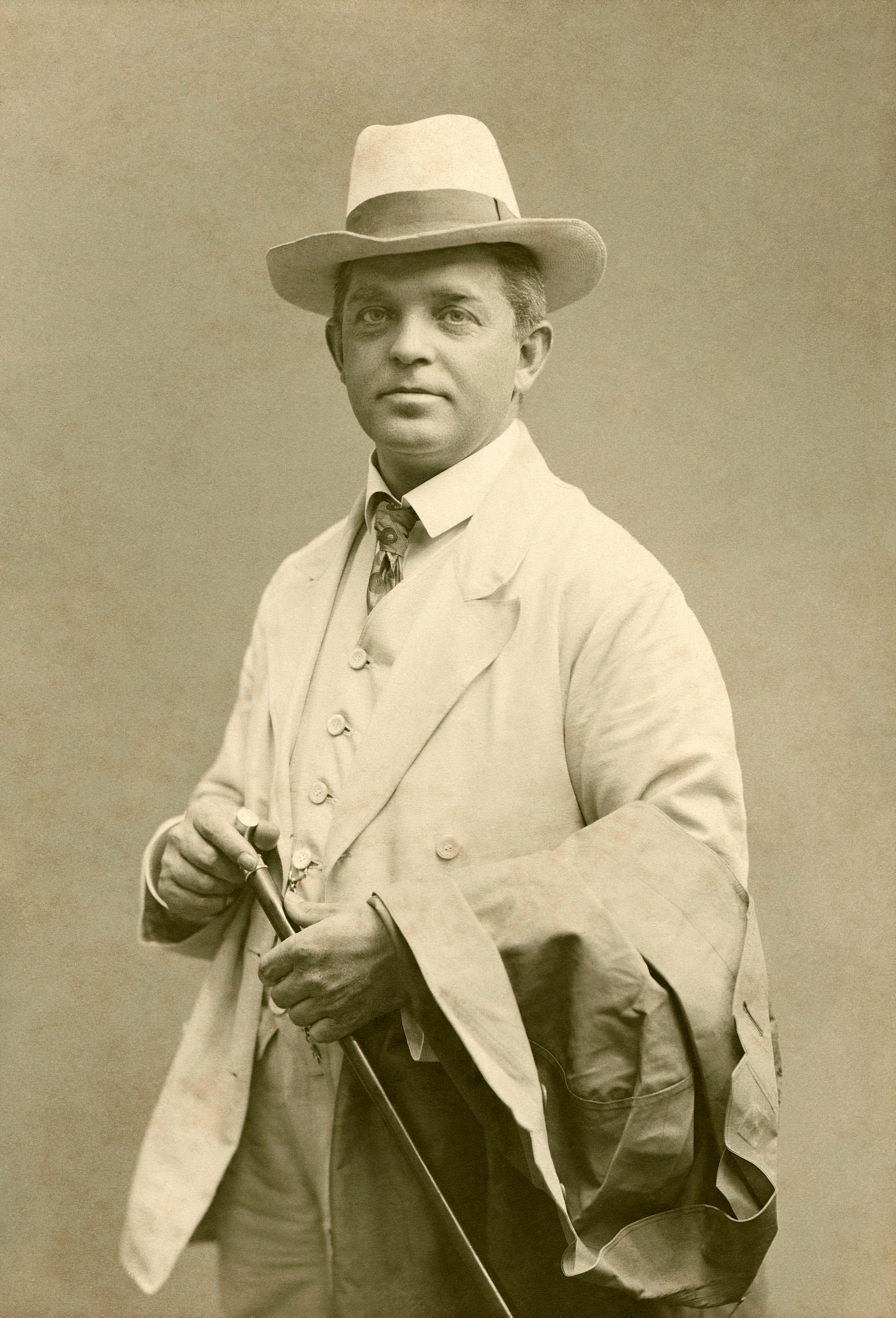
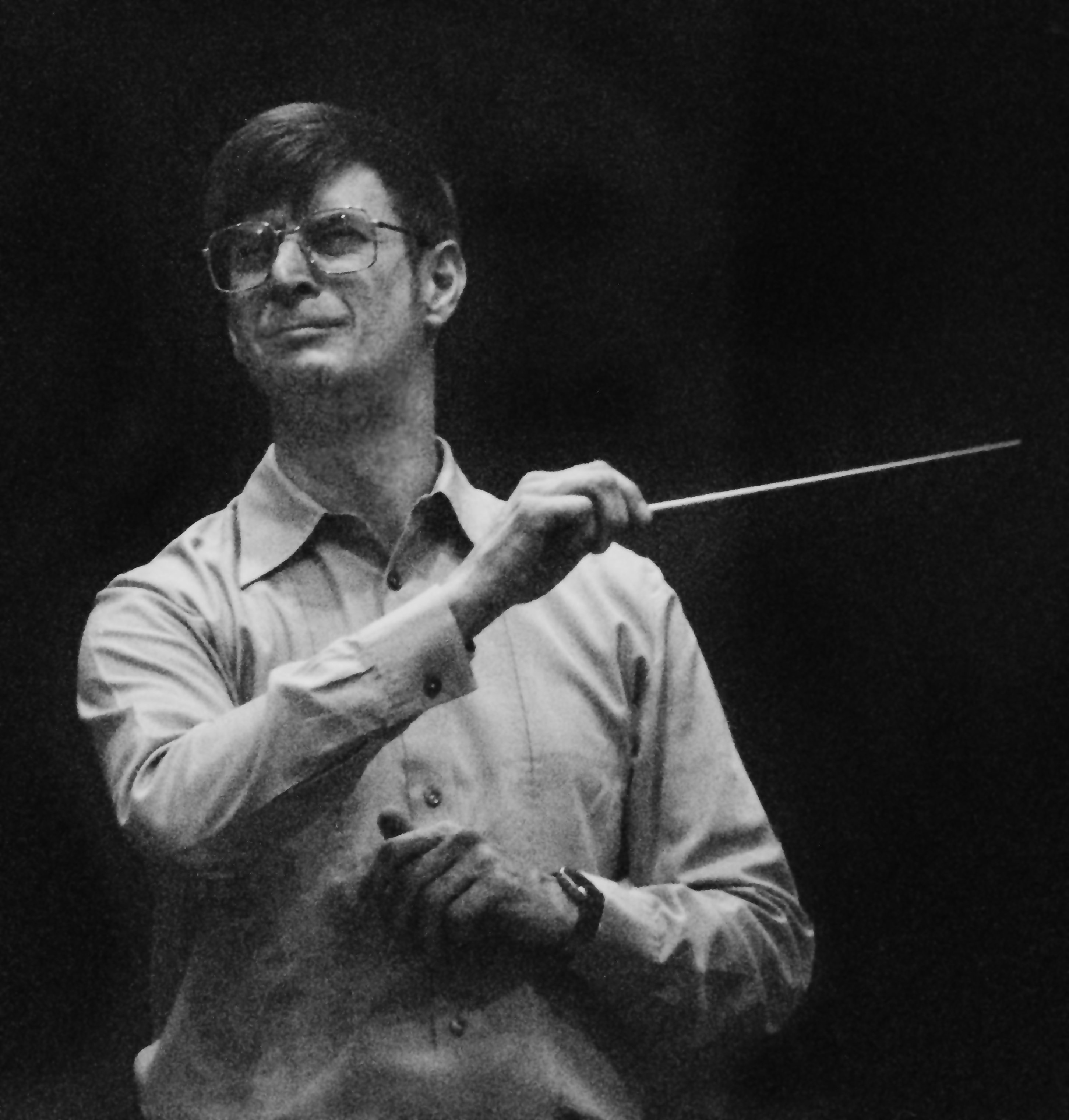
Nielsen (left) composed six symphonies from 1892–1925. In 1974, the conductor Herbert Blomstedt (right) and the Danish Radio Symphony Orchestra completed one of the first recorded Nielsen cycles.

The Danish composer Carl Nielsen (1865–1931) was one of the most important symphonists of the early twentieth century: his six symphonies, written between 1892 and 1925, are the core of his oeuvre. Many of classical music's conductor–orchestra partnerships have recorded the complete set, colloquially known as the "Nielsen cycle". Specifically, the standard cycle includes:

- Symphony No. 1 in G minor, Op. 7; FS 16 (1892)
- Symphony No. 2, The Four Temperaments (De fire Temperamenter), Op. 16; FS 29 (1902)
- Symphony No. 3, Sinfonia espansiva, Op. 27; FS 60 (1911)
- Symphony No. 4, The Inextinguishable (Det Uudslukkelige), Op. 29; FS 76 (1916)
- Symphony No. 5, Op. 50; FS 97 (1922)
- Symphony No. 6, Sinfonia semplice, FS 116 (1925)

As of as of November 2024, the Nielsen cycle been recorded 22 times. The most recently completed cycle, finished in 2022, is by Fabio Luisi and the Danish National Symphony Orchestra; an additional projected twenty-third cycle is in progress, according to press releases. Two conductors have tackled the project more than once: Herbert Blomstedt (1974, 1989) and Michael Schønwandt (2000, 2000) recorded the Nielsen cycle two times. Among ensembles, the Danish National Symphony Orchestra has recorded the cycle a record four times.

== Precursors ==
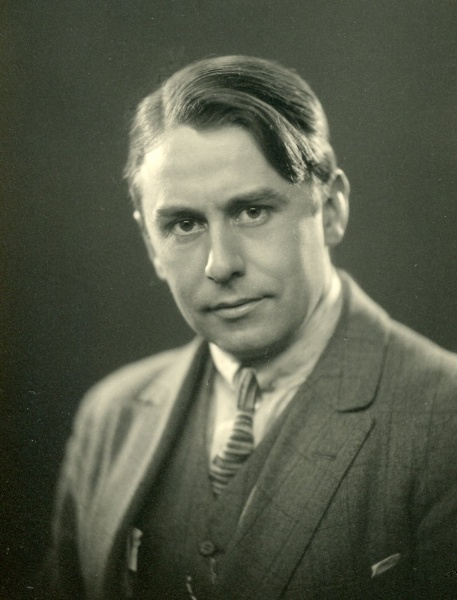
The Danish conductor Thomas Jensen pioneered an unofficial Nielsen cycle via piecemeal recordings from 1947–1959

Several Danish conductors associated with Danish Radio performed Nielsen's symphonies. Most notably, Thomas Jensen recorded the complete cycle with the Danish Radio Symphony Orchestra from 1947 to 1959: Symphonies Nos. 1 and 5 for Decca, No. 6 for Tono (Mercury in the U.S., World Record Club in the U.K.), and No. 2 for His Master's Voice (UK), as well as live broadcast recordings of Nos. 3 and 4. These have since been collected into an informal Nielsen cycle and re-released by Danacord.

Complete Nielsen cycles: 1974–present
Conductor	Orchestra	Years (Note: Refers to the timespan over which the conductor-orchestra pairing recorded the work(s); this may not be the same as the year(s) in which the recordings were first released to the general public.)	Symphony runtime (Note: All runtimes are official, as printed on CD or LP liner notes. For some recordings, the notes only provide runtimes for a symphony's constituent movements; in these cases, the movement runtimes were added to obtain a total duration.)						Recording venue	Label	Ref.
Conductor	Orchestra	Years	1	2	3	4	5	6	Recording venue	Label	Ref.
Thomas Jensen	Danish Radio Symphony Orchestra	1947–1959	32:52	31:05	34:51	33:16	33:30	32:44	Danish Radio Concert Hall	Danacord	

== Complete Nielsen cycles: 1974–present ==
=== Complete cycles ===
Complete Nielsen cycles: 1974–present
No.	Conductor	Orchestra	Years	Symphony runtime						Recording venue	Label	Ref.
No.	Conductor	Orchestra	Years	1	2	3	4	5	6	Recording venue	Label	Ref.
1	Ole Schmidt	London Symphony Orchestra (1)	1973–1974	34:34	31:55	38:26	34:02	35:43	35:02	Church of St. Giles, Cripplegate	Unicorn, Regis	
2	Herbert Blomstedt (1)	Danish Radio Symphony Orchestra (1)	1973–1974	35:52	33:46	35:58	34:09	35:35	35:12	Danish Radio Concert Hall	EMI Classics, Warner Classics	
3	Paavo Berglund	Royal Danish Orchestra	1987–1989	31:28	32:12	35:23	33:11	36:35	32:41	Odd Fellows Hall	RCA Red Seal	
4	Herbert Blomstedt (2)	San Francisco Symphony	1987–1989	32:57	32:21	35:23	36:13	35:34	34:01	Davies Symphony Hall	Decca	
5	Esa-Pekka Salonen	Swedish Radio Symphony Orchestra	1986–1990	32:21	32:27	37:57	36:07	36:52	32:19	Berwald Hall	CBS Masterworks, Sony Classical	
6	Bryden Thomson	Royal Scottish National Orchestra	1989–1991	32:10	30:15	36:18	35:41	35:02	33:48	Henry Wood Hall, Glasgow ^{(1–2)} Glasgow City Halls ^{(3, 5)} Caird Hall ^{(4, 6)}	Chandos	
7	Neeme Järvi	Gothenburg Symphony Orchestra	1990–1992	30:20	32:38	37:43	33:56	33:54	32:26	Gothenburg Concert Hall	Deutsche Grammophon	
8	Gennady Rozhdestvensky	Royal Stockholm Philharmonic Orchestra (1)	1992–1994	37:01	35:32	42:02	37:04	36:45	34:52	Stockholm Concert Hall	Chandos	
9	Adrian Leaper	National Symphony Orchestra of Ireland	1992–1994	33:08	32:23	35:51	36:28	37:04	34:25	National Concert Hall	Naxos	
10	Edward Serov	Odense Symphony Orchestra	1992–1995	36:08	?	37:47	36:24	35:41	35:51	[Unknown] (Note: The liner notes to this release do not contain information on the venue(s) at which the symphonies were recorded.)	Kontrapunkt	
11	Michael Schønwandt (1)	Danish National Radio Symphony Orchestra (2)	1999–2000	34:00	33:55	37:16	36:28	38:21	34:34	Danish Radio Concert Hall	Dacapo, Naxos	
12	Michael Schønwandt (2)	Danish National Radio Symphony Orchestra (3)	2000–2000	33:30	34:45	37:55	35:59	37:39	36:50	Danish Radio Concert Hall	Dacapo	
13	Jukka-Pekka Saraste	Finnish Radio Symphony Orchestra	1997–2001	31:06	32:10	36:22	36:37	34:48	31:37	Sibelius Hall ^{(1–2)} Kulttuuritalo ^{(3–6)}	Finlandia	
14	Douglas Bostock	Royal Liverpool Philharmonic Orchestra	1999–2001	31:21	31:19	35:40	34:45	33:11	33:33	Philharmonic Hall, Liverpool	Classico	
15	Osmo Vänskä	BBC Scottish Symphony Orchestra	1999–2002	35:45	33:41	36:14	35:31	36:40	33:44	Glasgow City Halls	BIS	
16	Theodore Kuchar	Janáček Philharmonic Orchestra	2005–2005	33:11	32:06	36:49	34:00	34:40	34:48	Janáček Hall	Brilliant Classics	
17	Sir Colin Davis	London Symphony Orchestra (2)	2009–2011	33:20	31:54	34:41	31:21	35:17	34:51	Barbican Centre	LSO Live (Note: This orchestra records under its in-house label.)	
18	Paavo Järvi	Frankfurt Radio Symphony	2009–2013	33:59	33:39	37:19	35:00	37:03	33:16	Friedrich-von-Thiersch-Saal, Wiesbaden Kurhaus ^{(1)} Großer Saal, Alte Oper ^{(2–6)}	RCA Red Seal	
19	Sakari Oramo	Royal Stockholm Philharmonic Orchestra (2)	2012–2014	33:50	31:21	37:48	35:15	33:50	32:32	Stockholm Concert Hall	BIS	
20	Alan Gilbert	New York Philharmonic	2011–2014	33:18	35:08	37:15	35:57	36:57	34:28	Avery Fisher Hall	Dacapo	
21	John Storgårds	BBC Philharmonic	2012–2015	33:20	33:09	37:57	35:08	36:00	35:18	MediaCityUK	Chandos	
22	Fabio Luisi	Danish National Symphony Orchestra (4)	2019–2022	33:51	34:56	39:22	36:31	35:45	35:38	DR Koncerthuset	Deutsche Grammophon	

== Incomplete Nielsen cycles: 1962–present ==
=== Projected cycles in progress ===
As of as of May 2026, there is one new Nielsen cycle in progress, by Edward Gardner and the Bergen Philharmonic Orchestra. Once completed, this will be a record fourth Nielsen cycle for Chandos.

Incomplete cycles no longer in progress
Conductor	Orchestra	Years	Symphony runtime						Recording venue	Label	Ref.
Conductor	Orchestra	Years	1	2	3	4	5	6	Recording venue	Label	Ref.
Edward Gardner	Bergen Philharmonic Orchestra	2022–	–	–	34:57	34:25	34:23	–	Grieg Hall	Chandos	

=== Incomplete cycles no longer in progress ===
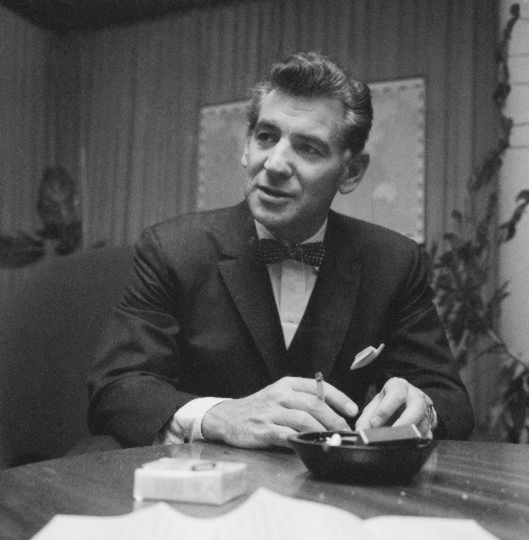
Leonard Bernstein recorded the four middle Nielsen symphonies, omitting bookends Nos. 1 and 6.

In addition to the 22 completed Nielsen cycles, there are a number of incomplete traversals available to the public. The sortable table below includes these incomplete cycles for which a conductor recorded with the same orchestra at least three of the six symphonies:

Incomplete cycles no longer in progress
Conductor	Orchestra	Years	Symphony runtime						Recording venue	Label	Ref.
Conductor	Orchestra	Years	1	2	3	4	5	6	Recording venue	Label	Ref.
Leonard Bernstein	New York Philharmonic	1962–1973	–	34:36	37:21	40:10	33:13	–	CBS 30th Street Studio ^{(2)} Odd Fellows Hall ^{(3)} Avery Fisher Hall ^{(4)} Manhattan Center ^{(5)}	Sony Classical (Note: Since the 19yys, Sony Classical has packaged the Bernstein–New York Philharmonic recordings of Symphonies Nos. 2–5 with recordings of Nos. 1 and 6 by the Hungarian-American conductor Eugene Ormandy, who in yyyy and yyyy recorded with Philadelphia Orchestra.)	
Myung-Whun Chung	Gothenburg Symphony Orchestra	1983–1989	33:55	34:11	37:30	–	33:05	–	Gothenburg Concert Hall	BIS (Note: Since 1993, BIS has packaged the Chung–Gothenburg SO recordings of Symphonies Nos. 1–3 and 5 with recordings of Nos. 4 (September 1990) and 6 (March 1992) by the same orchestra, albeit with the Estonian-American conductor Neemi Järvi. From 1990–92, Järvi recorded a complete cycle for Deutsche Grammophon, again with the Gothenburg Symphony Orchestra.)	
Thomas Dausgaard (Note: On 3 January 2022, Dausgaard resigned as musical director of the Seattle Symphony. As such, the planned third volume of his Nielsen cycle—which would have included Symphonies Nos. 5–6—likely is no longer in progress.)	Seattle Symphony	2015–2020	33:00	30:03	36:34	34:07	–	–	Benaroya Hall	Seattle Symphony Media	

== Notes, references, and sources ==
=== Sources ===
==== Liner notes ====
- Thomas Jensen Legacy, Volume 4: Carl Nielsen Symphonies 1 & 2 / Danish Orchestral Music by Koppel, Holmboe, Tarp, Schierbeck (CD booklet). Thomas Jensen & Danish Radio Symphony Orchestra. Dacacord. 2021. DACOCD 914.
- Thomas Jensen Legacy, Volume 6: Carl Nielsen Symphonies 3 & 4 / Sibelius Symphony 3 / Niels Viggo Bentzon Symphony 4 (CD booklet). Thomas Jensen & Danish Radio Symphony Orchestra. Dacacord. 2021. DACOCD 916.
- Thomas Jensen Legacy, Volume 13: Carl Nielsen Symphonies 5 & 6 / Sibelius Symphonies 1 & 4 (CD booklet). Thomas Jensen & Danish Radio Symphony Orchestra. Dacacord. 2022. DACOCD 923.
- Carl Nielsen: Complete Symphonies 1–6 (CD booklet). Ole Schmidt & London Symphony Orchestra. Regis. 2001. RRC 3002. OCLC 51491535
- Nielsen: Symphonies Nos. 1–6 (CD booklet). Herbert Blomstedt & Danish Radio Symphony Orchestra. Warner Classics. 2007. 50999 5 00829 2 6.
- Paavo Berglund Conducts Nielsen: Symphonies Nos. 1–6 (CD booklet). Paavo Berglund &Royal Danish Orchestra. RCA Red Seal. 2015. 88875052182. OCLC 45705881
- Nielsen: The Symphonies, Nos. 1–3 (CD booklet). Herbert Blomstedt & San Francisco Symphony. Decca. 1999. 460 985–2. OCLC 44657608
- Nielsen: The Symphonies, Nos. 4–5 (CD booklet). Herbert Blomstedt & San Francisco Symphony. Decca. 1999. 460 988–2.
- Nielsen: Symphony No. 4, "The Inextinguishable" / Helios Overture (CD booklet). Esa-Pekka Salonen & Swedish Radio Symphony Orchestra. CBS Masterworks. 1986. MK 42093. OCLC 13941964
- Nielsen: Symphony No. 1 (CD booklet). Esa-Pekka Salonen & Swedish Radio Symphony Orchestra. CBS Masterworks. 1987. MK 42321. OCLC 16876493
- Nielsen: Symphony No. 5 / Masquerade (Overture – Prelude – Dance) (CD booklet). Esa-Pekka Salonen & Swedish Radio Symphony Orchestra. CBS Masterworks. 1988. MK 44547. OCLC 20090123
- Nielsen: Symphony No. 2, "Four Temperaments" / Pan & Syrinx, Op. 49 / Aladdin Suite (CD booklet). Esa-Pekka Salonen & Swedish Radio Symphony Orchestra. CBS Masterworks. 1989. MK 44934. OCLC 25827799
- Nielsen: Symphonies No. 3 & 6 (CD booklet). Esa-Pekka Salonen & Swedish Radio Symphony Orchestra. Sony Classical. 1991. SK 46500. OCLC 25331790
- Nielsen: Complete Symphonies (CD booklet). Bryden Thomson & Royal Scottish Orchestra. Chandos. 1993. CHAN 9163–5. OCLC 28577373
- Nielsen: Complete Symphonies (CD booklet). Neeme Järvi & Gothenburg Symphony Orchestra. Deutsche Grammophon. 2005. E4775514.
- Carl Nielsen: Symphonies (CD booklet). Gennady Rozhdestvensky & Royal Stockholm Philharmonic Orchestra. Chandos. 2004. CHAN 10271(3) X. OCLC 58994049
- Nielsen: Symphony No. 4, "The Inextinguishable" / Symphony No. 5 (CD booklet). Adrian Leaper & National Symphony Orchestra of Ireland. Naxos. 1994. 8.550743. OCLC 31364800
- Nielsen: Symphony No. 2, "The Four Temperaments" / Symphony No. 3, "Sinfonia espansiva" (CD booklet). Adrian Leaper & National Symphony Orchestra of Ireland. Naxos. 1994. 8.550825. OCLC 36741004
- Nielsen: Symphony No. 1 / Symphony No. 6, "Sinfonia simplice" (CD booklet). Adrian Leaper & National Symphony Orchestra of Ireland. Naxos. 1995. 8.550826. OCLC 36741202
- Symphony No. 1 / Saul & David Suite / Helios Overture (CD booklet). Edward Serov & Odense Symphony Orchestra. Kontrapunkt. 1993. 32157. OCLC 31216905
- Carl Nielsen: Symphony No. 5 / Bohemian-Danish Folk Tune / Symphonic Rhapsody (CD booklet). Edward Serov & Odense Symphony Orchestra. Kontrapunkt. 1993. 32171. OCLC 30909784
- Carl Nielsen: Symphony No. 2 / Overture to Cupid and the Poet / Snefrid Suite (CD booklet). Edward Serov & Odense Symphony Orchestra. Kontrapunkt. 1994. 32178. OCLC 33858618
- Carl Nielsen: Symphony No. 4 / Pan and Syrinx / At the Bier of a Young Artist / Saga-Dream (CD booklet). Edward Serov & Odense Symphony Orchestra. Kontrapunkt. 1994. 32193. OCLC 34029965
- Carl Nielsen: Symphony No. 3 / Andante tranquillo–Scherzo / Maskarade Suite (CD booklet). Edward Serov & Odense Symphony Orchestra. Kontrapunkt. 1995. 32203. OCLC 34027540
- Carl Nielsen: Symphony No. 6 / Overture 3rd Act from Willemoes / Rhapsodic Overture / The Mother Suite (CD booklet). Edward Serov & Odense Symphony Orchestra. Kontrapunkt. 1995. 32210. OCLC 873441172
- Carl Nielsen: Symphony No. 2, "The Four Temperaments" / Symphony No. 3, "Sinfonia espansiva" (CD booklet). Michael Schønwandt & Danish National Radio Symphony Orchestra. Dacapo. 2000. 8.224126. OCLC 1040075865
- Carl Nielsen: Symphony No. 4, "The Inextinguishable" / Symphony No. 5 (CD booklet). Michael Schønwandt & Danish National Radio Symphony Orchestra. Dacapo. 2000. 8.224156. OCLC 45072324
- Carl Nielsen: Symphony No. 1 / Symphony No. 6, "Sinfonia simplice" (CD booklet). Michael Schønwandt & Danish National Radio Symphony Orchestra. Dacapo. 2000. 8.224169. OCLC 45916289
- Carl Nielsen: Complete Symphonies (DVD booklet). Michael Schønwandt & Danish National Radio Symphony Orchestra. Dacapo. 2006. 2.110403–05. OCLC 72848621
- Nielsen: Symphonies 4 & 5 (CD booklet). Jukka-Pekka Saraste & Finnish Radio Symphony Orchestra. Finlandia. 1998. 3984–21439–2. OCLC 40044656
- Nielsen: Symphonies 3 & 6 (CD booklet). Jukka-Pekka Saraste & Finnish Radio Symphony Orchestra. Finlandia. 2000. 3984–29714–2. OCLC 45656642
- Nielsen: Symphonies 1 & 2 (CD booklet). Jukka-Pekka Saraste & Finnish Radio Symphony Orchestra. Finlandia. 2001. 8573–85574–2. OCLC 308701403
- Carl Nielsen, Vol. 1: Symphony No. 2, "The Four Temperaments" / Symphony No. 5 (CD booklet). Douglas Bostock & Royal Liverpool Philharmonic Orchestra. Classico. 1999. CLASSCD 296. OCLC 46998302
- Carl Nielsen, Vol. 2: Symphony No. 3, "Sinfonia espansiva" / Helios / Songs / Paraphrase (CD booklet). Douglas Bostock & Royal Liverpool Philharmonic Orchestra. Classico. 1999. CLASSCD 297. OCLC 58481479
- Carl Nielsen, Vol. 3: Symphony No. 4, "The Inextinguishable" / Cupid and the Poet / Songs / Symphonic Rhapsody (CD booklet). Douglas Bostock & Royal Liverpool Philharmonic Orchestra. Classico. 1999. CLASSCD 298. OCLC 48505133
- Carl Nielsen, Vol. 4: Symphony No. 1 / Symphony No. 6, "Sinfonia simplice" / Andante tranquilo e Scherzo (CD booklet). Douglas Bostock & Royal Liverpool Philharmonic Orchestra. Classico. 1999. CLASSCD 299. OCLC 52032367
- Carl Nielsen: Symphony No. 1 / Symphony No. 6, "Sinfonia simplice" (CD booklet). Osmo Vänskä & BBC Scottish Symphony Orchestra. BIS. 2002. CD–1079. OCLC 49861136
- Carl Nielsen: Symphony No. 3, "Sinfonia espansiva" / Symphony No. 4, "The Inextinguishable" (CD booklet). Osmo Vänskä & BBC Scottish Symphony Orchestra. BIS. 2002. CD–1209. OCLC 52042963
- Carl Nielsen: Symphony No. 2, "The Four Temperaments" / Symphony No. 5 (CD booklet). Osmo Vänskä & BBC Scottish Symphony Orchestra. BIS. 2003. CD–1289. OCLC 53023779
- Nielsen: The Symphonies (Complete) (CD booklet). Theodore Kuchar & Janáček Philharmonic Orchestra. Brilliant Classics. 2012. 92885. OCLC 71515878
- Nielsen: Symphonies Nos. 1–6 (CD booklet). Sir Colin Davis & London Symphony Orchestra. LSO Live. 2015. LSO0789.
- Nielsen: The Complete Symphonies 1–6 (CD booklet). Paavo Järvi & Frankfurt Radio Symphony. RCA Red Seal. 2015. 88875178802. OCLC 1013699945
- Carl Nielsen: Symphony No. 4, "The Inextinguishable" / Symphony No. 5 (CD booklet). Sakari Oramo & Royal Stockholm Philharmonic Orchestra. BIS. 2013. BIS–2028 SACD. OCLC 870341006
- Carl Nielsen: Symphony No. 1 / Symphony No. 3, "Sinfonia espansiva" (CD booklet). Sakari Oramo & Royal Stockholm Philharmonic Orchestra. BIS. 2014. BIS–2048 SACD. OCLC 903286540
- Carl Nielsen: Symphony No. 2, "The Four Temperaments" / Symphony No. 6, "Sinfonia simplice" (CD booklet). Sakari Oramo & Royal Stockholm Philharmonic Orchestra. BIS. 2013. BIS–2128 SACD. OCLC 910345821
- Carl Nielsen: Symphony No. 3, "Sinfonia espansiva" / Symphony No. 2, "The Four Temperaments" (CD booklet). Alan Gilbert & New York Philharmonic. Dacapo. 2012. 6.220623. OCLC 844087341
- Carl Nielsen: Symphony No. 4, "The Inextinguishable" / Symphony No. 1 (CD booklet). Alan Gilbert & New York Philharmonic. Dacapo. 2014. 6.220624. OCLC 890322133
- Carl Nielsen: Symphony No. 5 / Symphony No. 6, "Sinfonia simplice" (CD booklet). Alan Gilbert & New York Philharmonic. Dacapo. 2014. 6.220625. OCLC 903375057
- Nielsen: Complete Symphonies (CD booklet). John Storgårds & BBC Philharmonic. Chandos. 2015. CHAN 10859(3). OCLC 910981885
- Carl Nielsen: The Symphonies (CD booklet). Fabio Luisi & Danish National Symphony Orchestra. Deutsche Grammophon. 2023. 4863471.
- Nielsen: Violin Concerto / Symphony No. 4, "The Inextinguishable" (CD booklet). Edward Gardner & Bergen Philharmonic Orchestra. Chandos. 2023. CHSA 5311.
- Nielsen: Flute Concerto / Symphony No. 3, "Sinfonia espansiva" / Pan and Syrnix (CD booklet). Edward Gardner & Bergen Philharmonic Orchestra. Chandos. 2024. CHSA 5312.
- Nielsen: Clarinet Concerto / Helios / Symphony No. 5 (CD booklet). Edward Gardner & Bergen Philharmonic Orchestra. Chandos. 2025. CHSA 5314.
- Nielsen: Symphony No. 2, "The Four Temperaments" / Symphony No. 4, "The Inextinguishable" (CD booklet). Leonard Bernstein & New York Philharmonic. Sony Classical. 1993. SMK 47597 (The Royal Edition, No. 59/100). OCLC 29010179
- Nielsen: Symphony No. 3, "Sinfonia espansiva" / Symphony No. 5 (CD booklet). Leonard Bernstein & New York Philharmonic. Sony Classical. 1993. SMK 47598 (The Royal Edition, No. 60/100). OCLC 29547226
- Carl Nielsen: The Six Complete Symphonies / The Three Concertos (CD booklet). Myung-Whun Chung & Gothenburg Symphony Orchestra. BIS. 1993. CD–614/616. OCLC 29570028
- Nielsen: Symphony No. 3, "Sinfonia espansiva" / Symphony No. 4, "The Inextinguishable" (CD booklet). Thomas Dausgaard & Seattle Symphony. Seattle Symphony Media. 2017. SSM1017. OCLC 1022190725
- Nielsen: Symphony No. 1 / Symphony No. 2, "The Four Temperaments" (CD booklet). Thomas Dausgaard & Seattle Symphony. Seattle Symphony Media. 2020. SSM1024. OCLC 1160050646

==== News articles ====
- Hernández, Javier (11 January 2022). "Seattle Maestro Resigns by Email and Says He Felt 'Not Safe'". The New York Times.
