= Saga-Drøm =

Symphonic poem by Carl Nielsen

Saga Dream
- Symphonic poem by Carl Nielsen
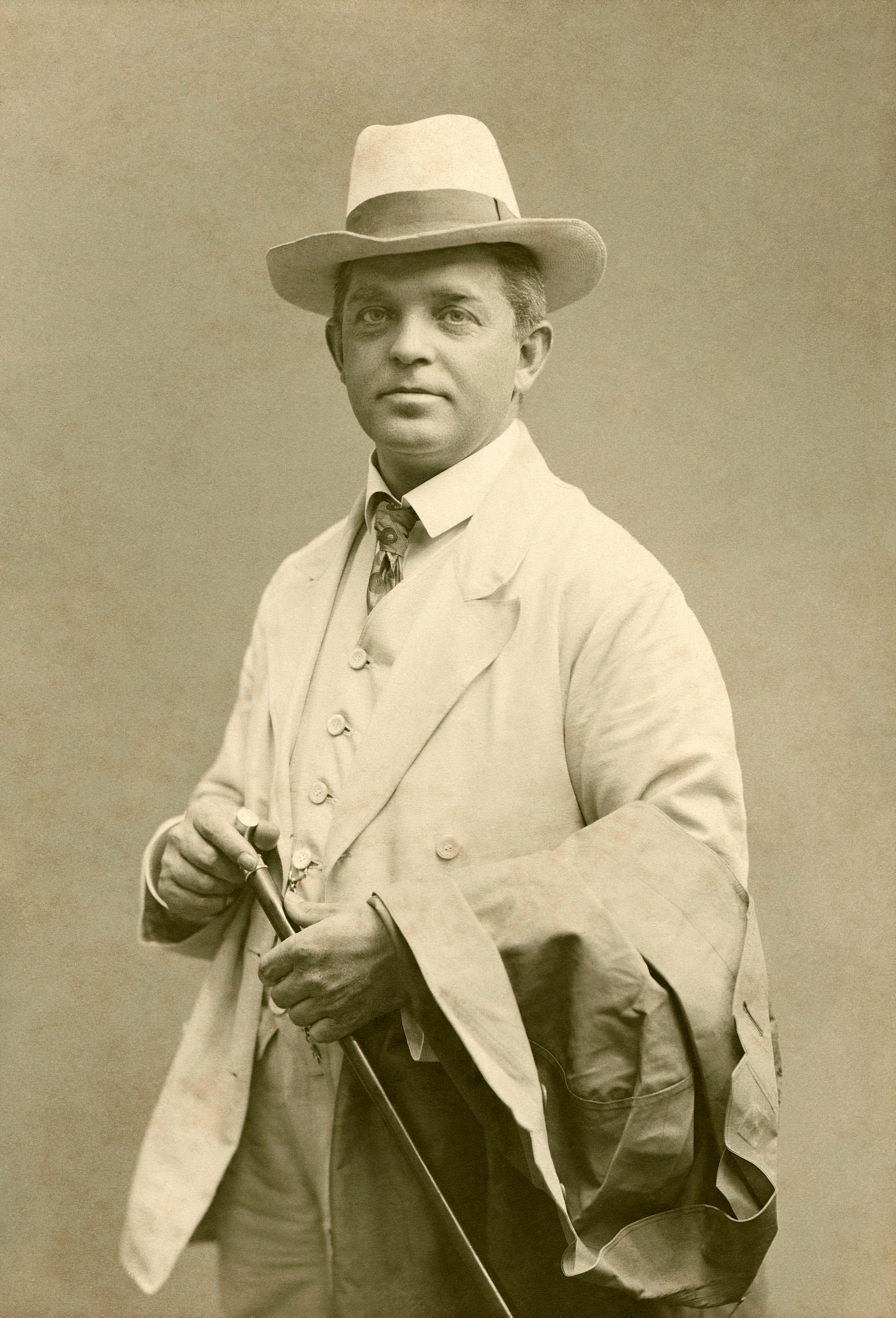
- The composer (1908)
- Native name: Saga-Drøm
- Catalogue: FS 46; CNW 35
- Opus: 39
- Composed: 1907–1908
- Publisher: Hansen (1920)
- Duration: 8–9 mins.

Premiere
- Date: 6 April 1908
- Location: Copenhagen, Denmark
- Conductor: Carl Nielsen
- Performers: Orchestra of the Music Society

Saga Dream (in Danish: Saga-Drøm), Op. 39 (FS 46; CNW 35), is a symphonic poem for orchestra written from 1907 to 1908 by the Danish composer Carl Nielsen. The piece, which is based on the thirteenth-century Icelandic saga Njála, received its premiere at the Odd Fellows Mansion in Copenhagen on 6 April 1908, with Nielsen conducting Orchestra of the Music Society (Musikforeningen).

== Background ==
While working on the music for Ludvig Holstein's drama Tove in the winter of 1907–08, Nielsen started to think about writing an orchestral piece based on Njal's Saga. The first traces of the introductory theme for clarinet and viola are to be found in a draft of Tove where it is played by a French horn. On April 1, 1908, just after completing Tove, Nielsen signed off the fair copy of Saga Drøm, only a few days before its scheduled performance.

Nielsen no doubt learned of Njal's Saga and the piece's motto "Now Gunnar dreams; let him enjoy his dream in peace" from the translation by N.M. Petersen. The saga tells how Gunnar, on his way out of the country with Kolskeg and Hjort after being sentenced to exile, is so tired that he calls for a stop and falls into a troubled sleep. Hjort asks whether they should rouse him but Kolskeg replies, "No, let him enjoy his dream." In his dream, Gunnar imagines they are being attacked by wolves. He and Kolskeg manage to defend themselves but Hjort is killed. The others see Gunnar is having a nightmare but Kolskeg still insists that he should not be disturbed.

== Reception ==
The reviews of the initial performance at the Music Society on April 6, 1908 were not very favorable. Dannebrog maintained:

"It is not music at all, nothing but juxtapositions of sounds and an eternal build-up from pianissimo to fortissimo." William Behrend, writing in Illustreret Tidende concluded that though the piece had a "highly stimulating effect... it seems to lack proportions — to be at once too short and too long, as dreams after all can be."

Robert Henriques, writing in Vort Land said:

"It is as much the daydreaming of a fantasist as a sleeping dream that the composer wanted to depict. The entire piece presents a clash between the reality of life (the fugato movement) and life as a preparatory stage for an afterlife (the chorale). In the middle of the piece Carl Nielsen has tried definitively to paint the confusion that seizes us when one idea after another rushes through our heads. He has done so very originally in a free cadenza of flute, oboe and clarinet, later joined by bassoon, violins and a few cymbal tremolos. Saga Dream once more shows the talented composer’s ability to intertwine fine fibres of atmosphere into a tissue of notes that expresses the depth-seeking imagination of a distinctive personality. In this music there is nothing specious, although it does not easily always find a straight path to the listener’s immediate understanding. But this music is not to be dismissed as it speaks its own serious, penetrating language."

== Instrumentation ==
Saga Dream is scored for the following instruments, organized by family (woodwinds, brass, percussion, and strings):

- 3 flutes, 2 oboes, 2 clarinets, and 2 bassoons
- 4 horns, 3 trumpets, 2 tenor trombones, 1 bass trombone, and tuba
- Timpani, suspended cymbal, and glockenspiel
- Violins (I and II), violas, cellos, and double basses

== Music ==
The unusual insertion of a free cadenza half way through the work may well explain why several of the reviewers were hesitant in condoning the piece. Kristeligt Dagblad referred specifically to "an intermezzo of a kind that can hardly be described in musical terms: it sounded more like an orchestra tuning up for a concert." However, this compositional approach is echoed in Nielsen's "The Market in Ispahan" of Aladdin Op. 34 (1918–19) where partitions of the orchestra build upon one another.

In an interview in Politiken published a few years later, Nielsen explained his work in some detail:

"I am so fond of the work myself. It is kept almost piano all the time and musically it is very radical. It depicts the dream of Gunnar of Hlidarende, this marvellous figure from Njal’s Saga who plundered and slaughtered, yet was still made of finer stuff and was ahead of his time. He dreams of a brighter, better future for mankind, and I have tried, in muted tones, to give voice to the strange ideas engendered in the dream. There are among other things four cadenzas for oboe, clarinet, bassoon and flute which run quite freely alongside one another, with no harmonic connection, and without my marking time. They are just like four streams of thought, each going its own way — differently and randomly for each performance — until they meet in a point of rest, as if flowing into a lock where they are united."

== Discography ==
The table below lists commercially available recordings of Saga Dream:

No.	Conductor	Ensemble	Rec. (Note: Refers to the year in which the performers recorded the work; this may not be the same as the year in which the recording was first released to the general public.)	Time	Recording venue	Label	Ref.
1	Tor Mann	Royal Stockholm Philharmonic Orchestra				Danacord	
2	Egisto Tango	Royal Danish Orchestra (1)				Danacord	
3	Erik Tuxen	Danish Radio Symphony Orchestra (1)	1957	9:03	Danish Radio Concert Hall	Danacord	
4	Thomas Jensen	Danish Radio Symphony Orchestra (2)	1961	8:49	Danish Radio Concert Hall	Danacord	
5	Igor Markevitch	Royal Danish Orchestra (2)	1966	9:05	Danish Radio Concert Hall	Heliodor, Turnabout	
6	Jascha Horenstein	New Philharmonia Orchestra	1969		Barking Assembly Hall	Unicorn-Kanchana	
7	Herbert Blomstedt	Danish Radio Symphony Orchestra (3)	1975	9:01	Danish Radio Concert Hall	EMI Classics	
8	Gennady Rozhdestvensky	Danish National Symphony Orchestra (4)	1993	10:12	Danish Radio Concert Hall	Chandos	(Note: G. Rozhdestvensky–Chandos (CHAN 9287) 1994)
9	Edward Serov	Odense Symphony Orchestra	1994	10:26	[Unknown] (Note: The liner notes to this release do not contain information on the venue(s) at which the work was recorded.)	Kontrapunkt	
10	Neeme Järvi	Gothenburg Symphony Orchestra	1995	8:43	Gothenburg Concert Hall	Deutsche Grammophon	
11	Niklas Willén	South Jutland Symphony Orchestra	2002	9:48	Musikhuset, Sønderborg	Naxos	
12	Lance Friedel	Aarhus Symphony Orchestra (1)	2004	9:07	Frichsparker, Aarhus	MSR Classics	
13	Osmo Vänskä	Lahti Symphony Orchestra	2006	7:43	Sibelius Hall	BIS	
14	Douglas Bostock	Aarhus Symphony Orchestra (2)	2007	9:33	[Unknown], Ålborg	CDKlassisk	
