= Louis Glass =

Danish composer (1864–1936)

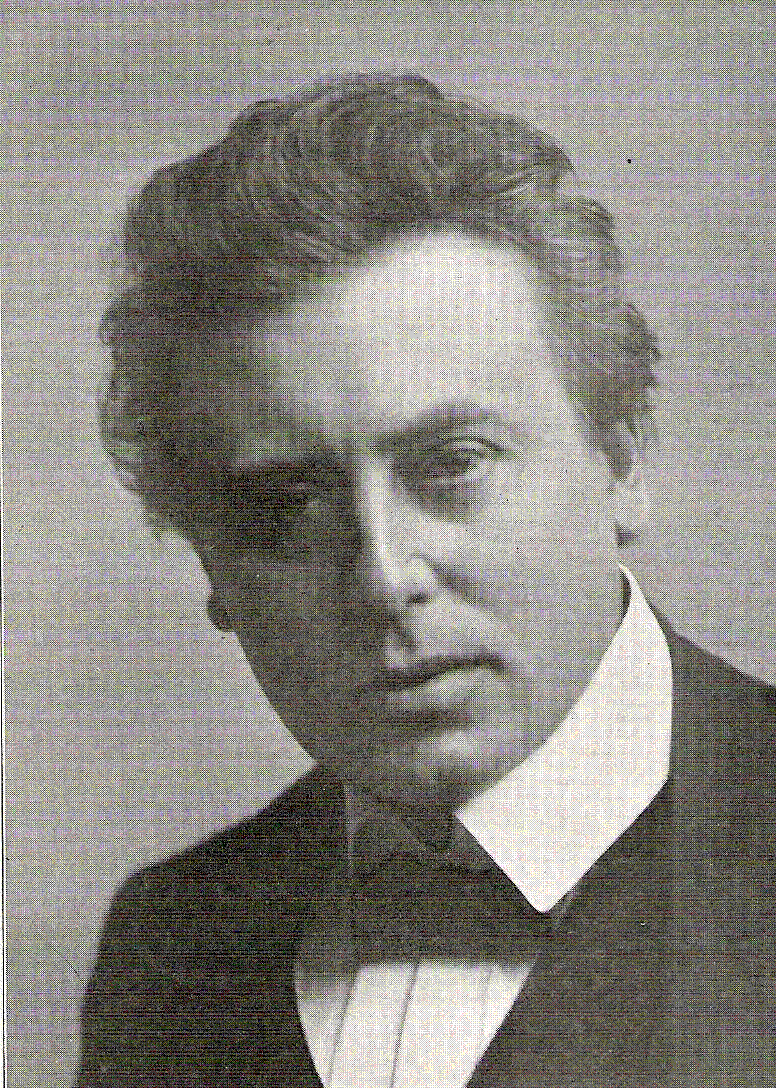
- Born: Louis Christian August Glass; 23 March 1864; Copenhagen, Denmark
- Died: 22 January 1936 (aged 71); Copenhagen, Denmark
- Occupation: Composer

Louis Christian August Glass (23 March 1864 – 22 January 1936) was a Danish composer. Glass, born in Copenhagen, was an almost exact contemporary of Carl Nielsen and, like Nielsen, was a student of Niels Gade. However, Glass also studied at the Brussels Conservatory, where he became enamored of the music of César Franck and Anton Bruckner, both of whom stylistically influenced his writing. For several years, he was one of Denmark's leading concert pianists until a paralysis in one arm made him retire from the stage. He then devoted himself primarily to composing. He composed in most genres and wrote several chamber music works of worth, including four string quartets, a string sextet, a piano trio, a piano quintet and several instrumental sonatas.

He wrote six symphonies (1893–1926), which have been recorded on the Danacord and CPO record labels, while some chamber music has been recorded on Da Capo.

Glass died in Copenhagen.

== Symphonies ==
- Symphony No. 1 in E-major, Op. 17 (1894)
- Symphony No. 2 in C-minor, Op. 28 (1899)
- Symphony No. 3 in D-major, Op. 30 "Forest symphony" (1901)
- Symphony No. 4 in E-minor, Op. 43 (1911)
- Symphony No. 5 in C-major, Op. 57 "Sinfonia Svastika" (1919) - Note on the title: This work celebrates the swastika as a Vedic good fortune or Sun symbol. At the time of composition in 1918–1919, the Nazi movement had not been established.
- Symphony No. 6 "Skjoldungeæt" (The Birth of Scyldings), Op.60 (1924)

=== Recordings ===
Between 1999 and 2001, conductor Nayden Todorov and the Plovdiv Philharmonic Orchestra recorded all six symphonies for the Danish label Danacord, released across four CDs (DACOCD 541–544), together with the Fantasia for Piano and Orchestra, Op. 47. This constitutes the first complete recording of the symphonies in any format. The final disc in the series (DACOCD 544) also contains the premiere recording of Symphony No. 1, which had never previously been commercially released. The individual discs were reviewed by MusicWeb International upon their original release between 2000 and 2001.

A second complete cycle was subsequently recorded by conductor Daniel Raiskin and the Staatsorchester Rheinische Philharmonie for the German label CPO, released in multiple volumes from 2014 onwards (CPO 777 525-2, CPO 777 494-2, CPO 777 898-2). The series also includes shorter orchestral works by Glass, some in world premiere recordings.
