= Søvnen =

Choral composition by Carl Nielsen

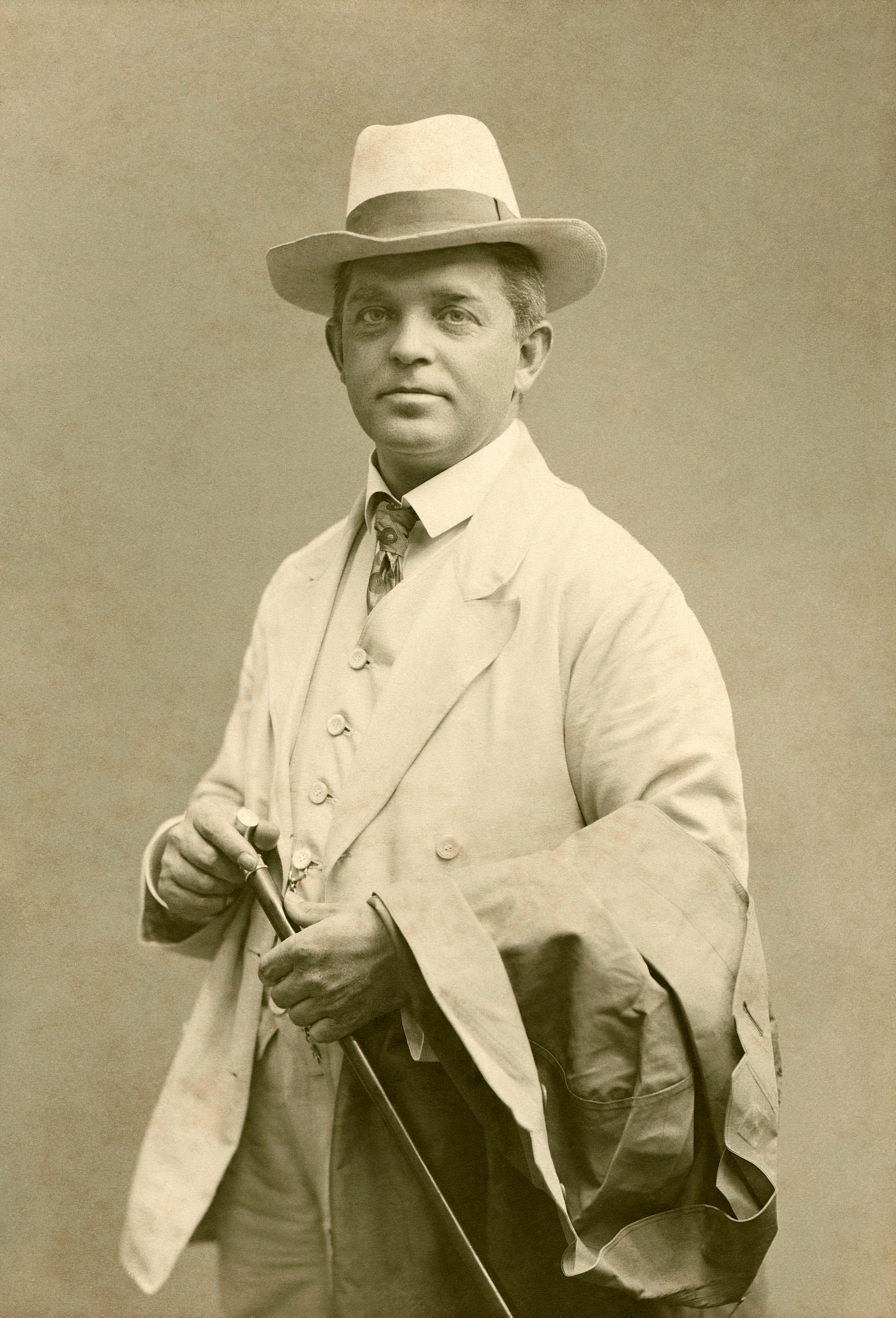
Carl Nielsen circa 1908.

Søvnen (The Sleep), for chorus and orchestra, Opus 18, is Carl Nielsen's second major choral work. It was first performed at the Music Society (Musikforeningen) in Copenhagen on 21 March 1905 under the baton of the composer.

== Background ==
The idea of writing Søvnen occurred to Nielsen in Athens shortly after he had composed the Helios Overture in early 1903. He asked Julius Lehmann whether he would like to write the text for the work but Lehmann declined. As a result, Nielsen began to write a text himself. Although he did not get very far with it, the idea behind the work comes across as calm sleep evolves into a nightmare: "The sons of Sleep, the Dreams, and their sisters, the Dream Sisters, rise up sleepily one by one. They are chained under the crown of the balm tree where first lazily, then attentively, they lift their heads and look in front of them... The whole world shakes and everything seems about to explode. Some voices shout for murder and blood."

However, Nielsen had difficulty in advancing with the work. On 26 November 1903, in a letter to his friend Henrik Knudsen, he explains: "Today I have begun work on ‘Sleep’. It is indeed high time I did begin, for tomorrow it is the 28th of November and thus just a year since Saul and David was played for the first time, and in all that time I have only managed to produce the Helios Overture." In his memoirs, Svend Godske-Nielsen tells of how Nielsen appeared to escape from his difficulties when he "managed to write his beautiful melody for the poem Sænk kun dit Hoved, du Blomst (Lower thy head, o flower)." Johannes Jørgensen, who wrote the text of the song on 8 December 1903, also wrote the text for Søvnen although it is not clear how closely the two are related.

In a letter to Johannes Jørgensen dated 25 July 1903, Nielsen explains:

I would like to portray sleep in music, a sort of hymn to its glory. Sleep heals all wounds and alleviates all troubles, it is the greatest good for all living creatures and the blissful state where nothing is hard and palpable but everything swims along in a long, golden eternity. Sleep has its dreams, both good and bad, but they must each return to their own quarters: for sleep can probably be disturbed but it never can be killed. (Macbeth).

It might therefore be a kind of poem in three parts. But do not be alarmed: there need not be many words and lines in each part, because unlike the other arts, music has of course the faculty of slowing down and speeding up whenever necessary. Perhaps you find the idea is not poetic or suitable for poetic treatment. But do whatever you can, dear friend, for I assure you that it is musically poetic in the highest degree.

I wish I was talented enough myself. But now permit me to explain what I would have written if I had been in a position to write the poems and shape the piece myself, though I recognize I do not have the slightest ability to do so. Just the raw ingredients, which you obviously should not take too seriously, but they will convey the direction in which I wish to go. I suggest:

I. Quietly and dreamily, the cloud veers off to the west.

Fluffily, it rolls down below the earth's dark curve
And the sun's last dark-red glow
kisses — between long, lingering shadows —
The green moss on great trees and stones
And everything opens up and breathes long
and deep in a tired smiling fight
For a wealth of balm and manna and joy.

II. But out on the distant horizon

Come
- Dreams of bliss
- Of evil
- Of terror

Help!

III. Great inquiring human eyes

lower two by two
their soft dull heavy lids
and close like sleeping calyces
who have drunk in the sun's bright crimson rays
a day of dreams
And sleep's soft wide waters
flow over the whole world:

And then there might even be a look at the last long slumber.

So, dear John Jorgensen:
I. some words that express the joy of sleep
II.something that disturbs it
III.the first mood with perhaps an allusion to death.

If you would do this for me, I just do not know what I could do for you. You certainly will not regret it, because in addition to your fees, my gratitude and my friendship will certainly make a contribution. Please accept sincere greetings from my wife. She asks me to write to you that she is looking forward to meeting you and your wife in the near future, as we have to tell you about Greece and talk about Rome and many other wonderful places.

But a few days later, a second letter from Nielsen to Jørgensen shows that he was not happy with the poet's first attempt. He had to explain that there was a big difference between composing for soloists and for choirs. He said that all he needed was just a few lines, similar to what those in old church compositions such as the Gloria or the Creed. Jørgensen apparently was not offended and on 21 November 1903 provided a new, more suitable text which formed the basis for Nielsen's composition although Nielsen did make a few further changes.

Carl Nielsen’s rough draft for the cantata is dated 10 November 1904 while his fair copy is dated 27 November 1904.

== Reception ==
During the rehearsals for the first performance, Nielsen confidently wrote to his wife Anne Marie: "I consider it my most noteworthy and fully conceived work so far and I think I have fully succeeded in expressing what I wanted." The reviews for the first performance at the Music Society on 21 March 1905, however, were not quite as positive. Dannebrog commented: "In this work one again finds much of the strange and affected and the decided inclination to pile up jarring sound effects that is peculiar to this highly gifted composer. To some extent, though, these devices are justified by the words and tendency of the poetry. After an introduction that exhibits great beauty and tellingly paints the bliss of rest, 'as by the great and silent rivers that flow in peace and darkness', the composer makes a highly characteristic transition to the horrors of the night, the pernicious visions that grow into horrific hallucinations and culminate in a scream of mortal dread. This growth is carried off with considerable dramatic power and the composer really achieves the intended goal. The last section should be shortened; after the great strain the long ending, which repeats the words and mood of the introduction, has a rather fatiguing effect. Choir and orchestra performed this interesting new work excellently, and Mr. Carl Nielsen, who himself conducted, was acclaimed with a storm of applause and several curtain calls."

Socialdemokraten described the work as "a peculiar and atmospheric piece of musical poetry" but also picked out the beauty of "the gentle string textures in the prelude and the first strophes of the choir with their soothing descent into the wondrous peace of sleep." Dagens Nyheder went so far as to say that the composer "actually seems to want to make his music cacophonous", while Københavns Adresseavis comments that "the composer’s striving to find fully realistic expression in music, combined with his penchant for originality, leads him into a chaos of distorted, disharmonic note combinations." But Vort Land seems to have understood Nielsen's intentions: "All credit must go to this music, because it testifies to both an urge towards independence and a decided honesty. And at bottom this choral work possesses a shuddering authenticity which can only move, because it comes from a true artist’s heart..."

When the work was subsequently performed at a concert of Nielsen's works on 12 November 1905, Socialdemokraten called the piece "one of Carl Nielsen’s most beautiful works" but Charles Kjerulf, writing in Politiken is far more critical: "The gravest charge against the composer in this respect was in the central section of Søvnen, the one that depicts the nightmare. This mare rides along literally in the wildest hunt of the falsest notes, which the choir cannot even hit. Every instant one gets different false notes instead, but it has no great influence on the result. During the minutes such a movement lasts, even the most well-intentioned Danish music-lover is on the point of renouncing Carl Nielsen and all his works."

When the work was performed some 13 years later on 11 February 1918, Dagbladet wrote: "Søvnen probably sounded rather inoffensive to those who have become used to the far freer and more personal expression that Carl Nielsen’s imagination finds today; all the same it is such a beautiful and evocative work that one was glad to see it unearthed from the archives."

== Music ==
Søvnen is a work in three movements. The first and last describe in which the composer's elysian Brahmsian style is present depict gentle and restful sleep free of worry. This blissfulness is contrasted in the middle movement by an eldritch cabalistic rite revealing the terror of a nightmare that is associated with claustrophobia and other fears of being held captive, or falling down a deep chasm. The cantata ends in a murmurous glow. Nielsen's study of the music of Max Reger greatly influenced this composition, particularly the nightmare section.
