= Danacord =

Danish classical music record label

Danacord is a Danish classical music record label founded in 1979 in Copenhagen by Jesper Buhl. Danacord has made many premiere recordings of lesser known Danish music. Among the label's historical projects is Kai Laursen plays 26 Danish Violin Concertos, a ten-CD anthology of Danish violin concertos performed by violinist Kai Laursen (1924-1996) with the Danish Radio Symphony Orchestra and other Danish ensembles under conductors including Launy Grøndahl, Thomas Jensen, Mogens Wöldike, John Frandsen and Ole Schmidt. The collection is covering 200 years, in 10 volumes and includes concertos by composers such as Niels Gade, Hakon Børresen, P. E. Lange-Müller, Rued Langgaard, Vagn Holmboe, Knudåge Riisager and Ib Nørholm.

Danacord issued a complete symphonic cycle of Rued Langgaard, released as The Complete Symphonies, performed by the Artur Rubinstein Philharmonic Orchestra and Choir under conductor Ilya Stupel, with soloists including Roma Owsińska, Tadeusz Chmielewski and Jan Wolański.

The label has also released recordings of the complete symphonies of Victor Bendix, performed by the Omsk Philharmonic Orchestra under Evgeny Shestakov.

Another large-scale Danish composer project was Danacord's complete recording of the six symphonies of Louis Glass, performed by the Plovdiv Philharmonic Orchestra under Bulgarian conductor Nayden Todorov.

Niels Gade has been represented in Danacord's catalogue through chamber and piano projects, including Complete Works for Trio, performed by the Copenhagen Trio, and recordings of Gade's complete works for piano duet performed by Piano Duo Diga, Tanja Zapolski and Rikke Sandberg.

Danacord has also issued multi-volume recordings of the complete piano music of J.P.E. Hartmann, performed by Danish pianist Thomas Trondhjem.

The label's catalogue also includes recordings devoted to Ludolf Nielsen, including symphonies and orchestral works performed by the Moscow Symphony Orchestra under conductor Igor Golovschin.

Danacord has recorded and issued Danish chamber and instrumental music by Fini Henriques, including Works for Violin and Piano, performed by violinist Johannes Søe Hansen and pianist Christina Bjørkøe, and piano music performed by Christina Bjørkøe.

Danacord has additionally released large historical collections devoted to Carl Nielsen, including the Carl Nielsen On Record series of vintage and historical recordings. The series includes performances by conductors such as Launy Grøndahl, Erik Tuxen and Thomas Jensen, and documents Nielsen's symphonic, orchestral, vocal and choral music in early Danish recordings.

Danacord's catalogue also includes historical recordings of Danish late-Romantic symphonic repertoire, including works by Louis Glass, Rudolph Simonsen, Hakon Børresen and Herman Sandby performed by the Danish Radio Symphony Orchestra under Launy Grøndahl.
