= Erik Tuxen =

Danish conductor (1902–1957)

Erik Oluf Tuxen (4 July 1902 – 28 August 1957) was a Danish conductor, composer, bandleader, and arranger. He worked for most of his life in Denmark. From 1936 until his death in 1957, he was a conductor at the Danish National Symphony Orchestra of Danish Radio.

Along with Thomas Jensen and Launy Grøndahl, Tuxen pioneered performances and recordings of Carl Nielsen's music. Tuxen was also a prolific film arranger, responsible for the musical direction for many Danish films in the 1930s and 1940s. He was also a jazz bandleader.

He gave the British premiere of Nielsen's Fifth Symphony at the 1950 Edinburgh International Festival where it created a sensation. Later that year, he conducted the symphony's first commercial recording.
