= Berwald Hall =

Concert hall in Stockholm, Sweden

Coordinates: 59°20′00″N 18°06′02″E

- Berwaldhallen
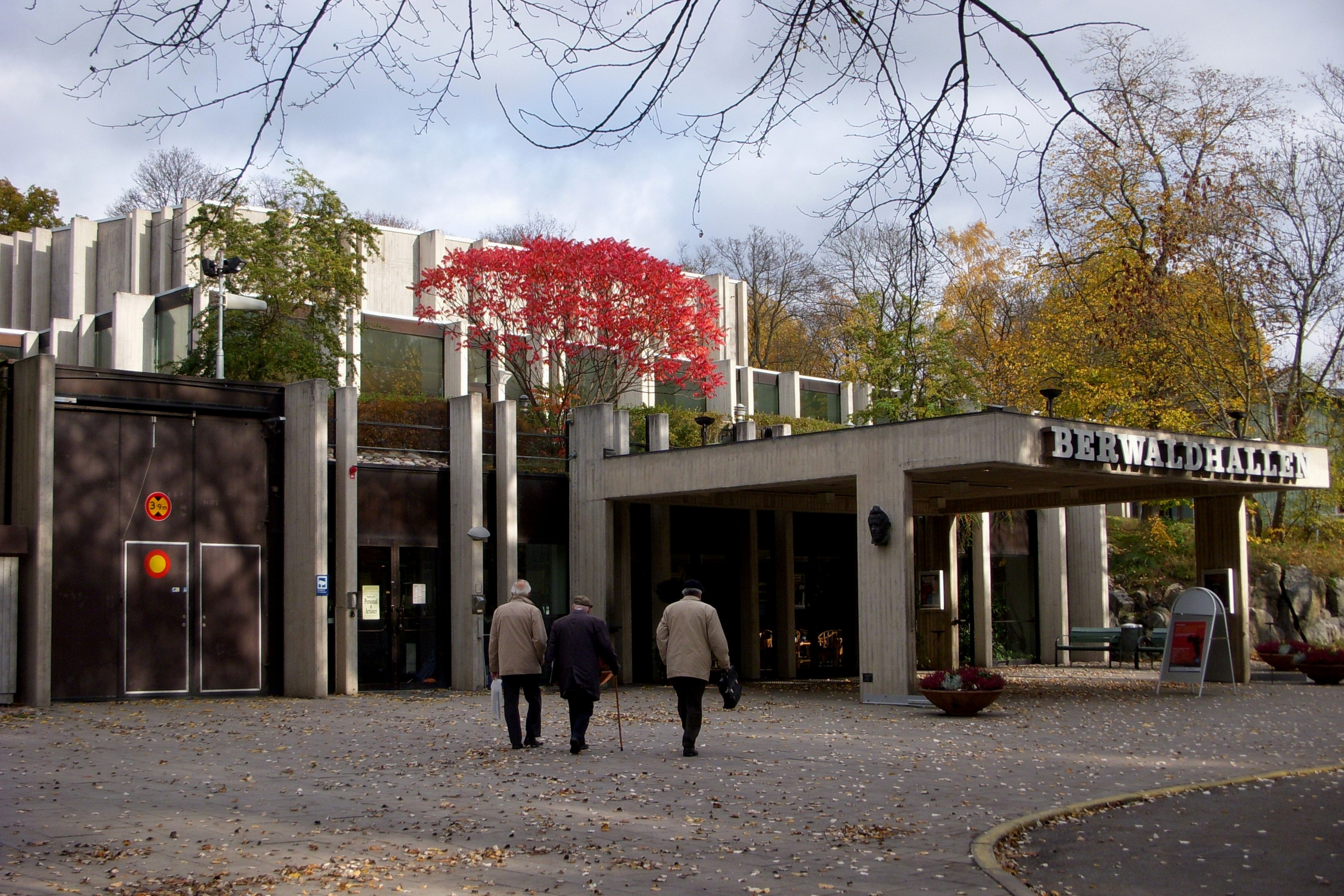
- Berwald Hall in the autumn of 2008
- Interactive map of the Berwald Hall area

General information
- Location: Stockholm, Sweden
- Groundbreaking: 1976
- Opened: 30 November 1979

The Berwald Hall (Swedish: Berwaldhallen) is a concert hall situated in a park landscape at Dag Hammarskjölds väg 3 in the Östermalm district of Stockholm, Sweden. Construction on the building began in 1976 based on a design by architects Erik Ahnborg and Sune Lindström. The hall is shaped as a hexagon.

The seating is 1,302 places, of which 482 are in the stalls. The hall won a Europa Nostra architecture award as an "admirably sensitive designed concert hall".

== History ==
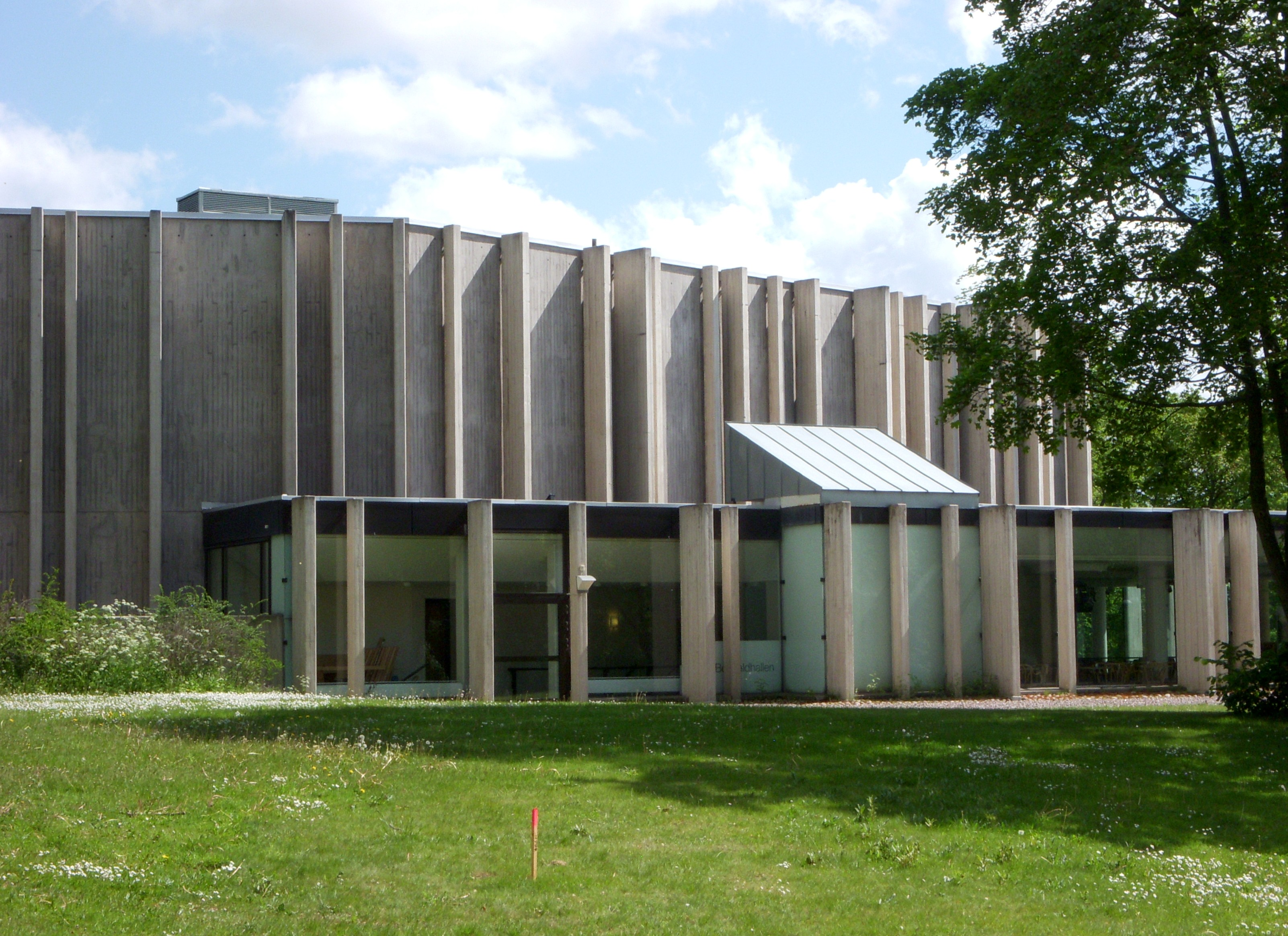
Western elevation

In 1966, the head of Swedish radio Olof Rydbeck and director of music Karl-Birger Blomdahl approached the then Minister of Transport and Communications Olof Palme about the need for a new home for the national radio orchestra where they could rehearse, record and give concerts in the same hall. Plans began in the 1970s.

The hall was originally supposed be located at the end of the Karlavägen esplanade but was moved further along the water. The site was selected to allow the hall to merge with nature and was positioned in the rock so it would not look too large. The interior hexagonal shape was partly for acoustic reasons, but the hall had to be acoustically adjusted several times subsequently. Gaps between the wood panels were adjusted to control the reverberation time.

== Concert activity ==
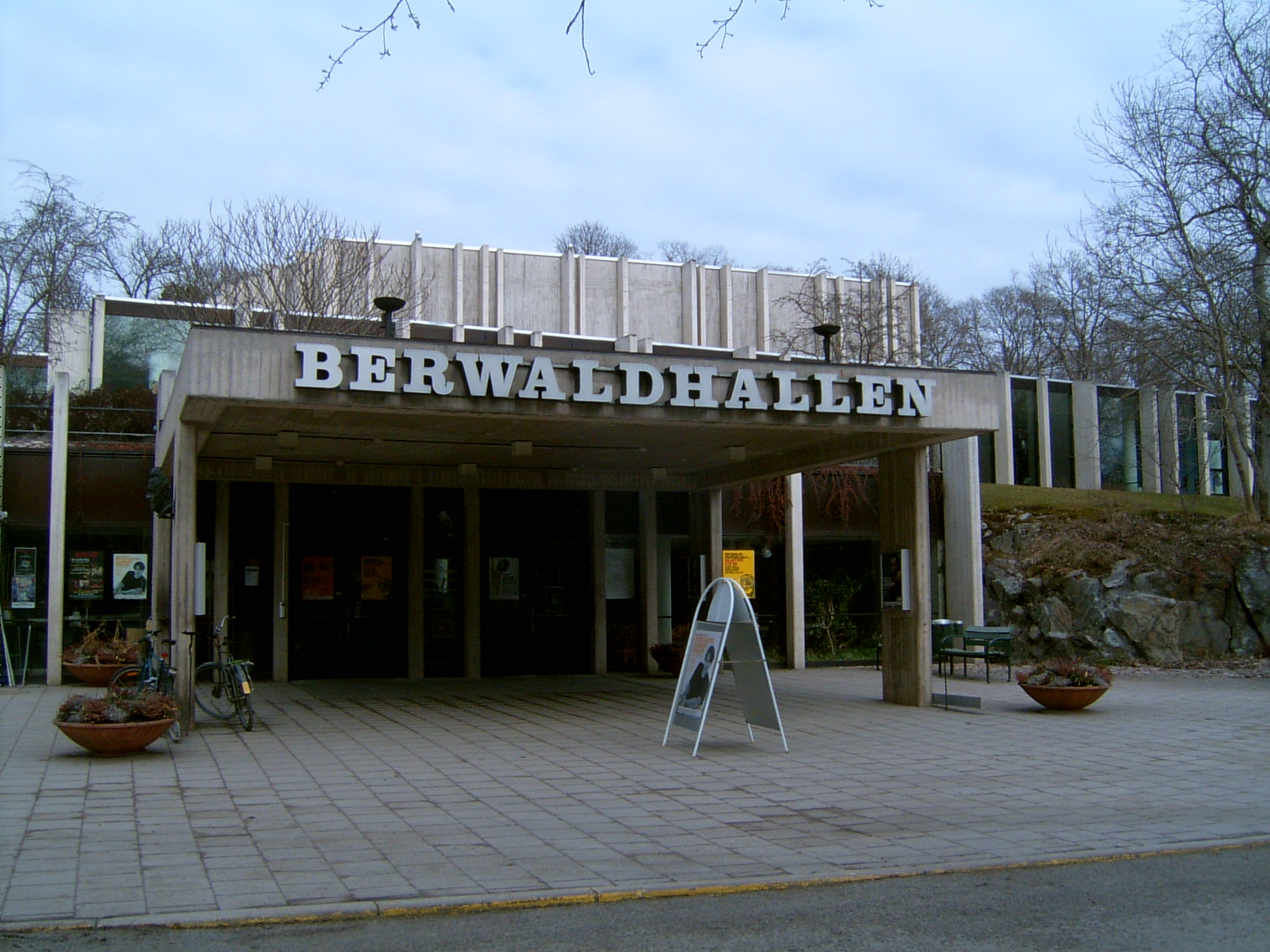
Berwaldhallen main entrance

The inaugural concert was on 30 November 1979. Herbert Blomstedt conducted the Swedish Radio Symphony Orchestra and Choir in Franz Berwald's Sinfonie singulière, a commission from Sven-Erik Bäck - the cantata 'Vid havets yttersta gräns' (words by Östen Sjöstrand), and the Symphonie fantastique by Berlioz.

Since 1979, the Berwald Hall has been home not only to the Swedish Radio Symphony Orchestra, but also to the Swedish Radio Choir. It also welcomes guest orchestras from Sweden and abroad. Most SRSO concerts at the hall are broadcast live nationally on P2 while others are also broadcast via the European Broadcasting Union.

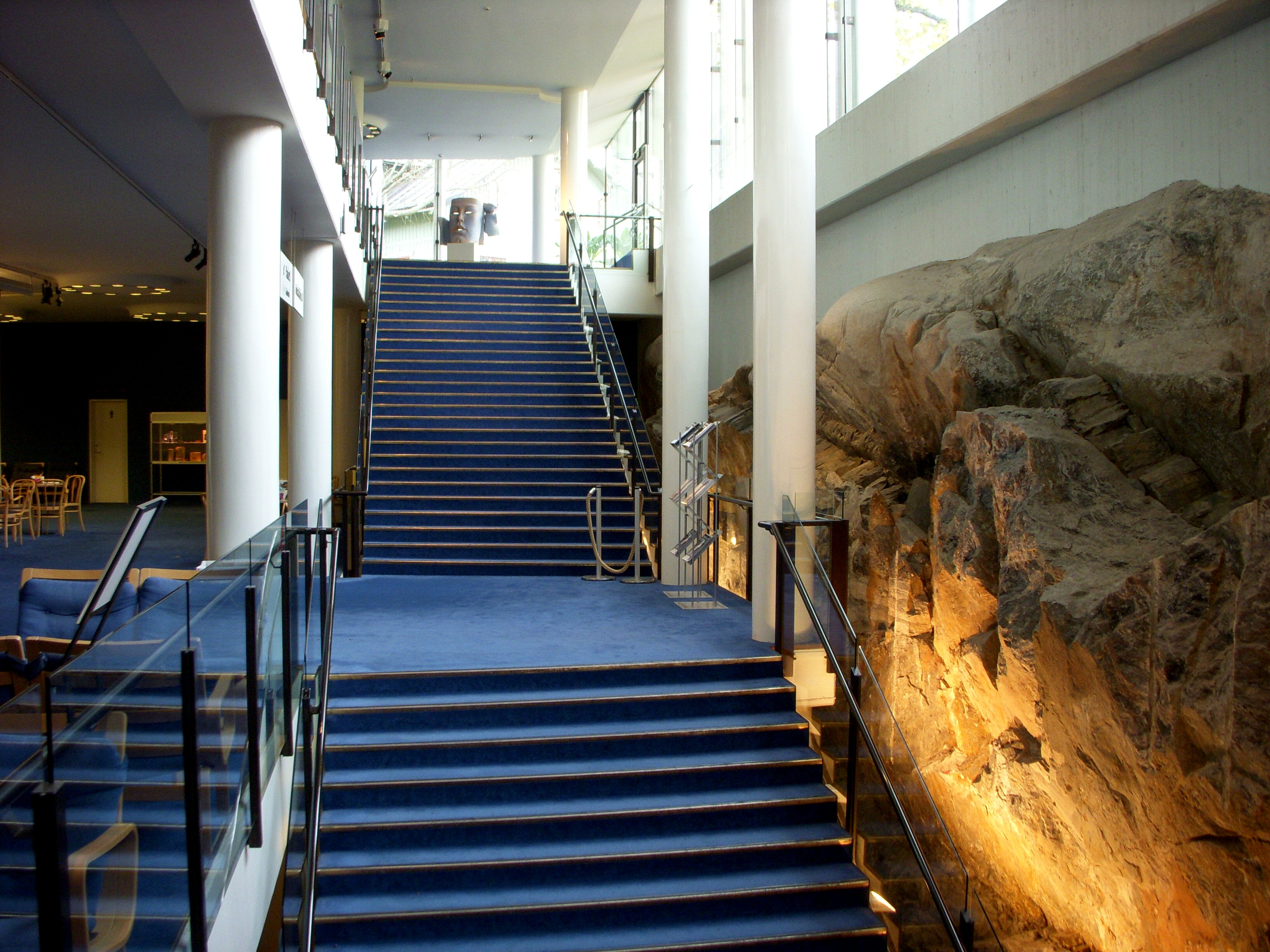
Foyers, showing the rock

The Berwald Hall is named after Franz Berwald one of Sweden's foremost composers of the 19th century. At the main entrance to the concert hall there is a sculpture of Berwald by the Swedish artist Carl Eldh.

Since 2003, the Östersjöfestivalen (Baltic Sea Festival) in late summer each year is based at the Berwald Hall for a series of events. Orchestras from around the Baltic and northern Europe participate, including youth ensembles.

The building is sometimes casually called "the mine" (gruvan) in reference to the hall's location partially underground. Diplomatstaden and the American embassy are located next to the Berwald Hall.
