= Aarhus Symphony Orchestra =

Danish orchestra founded in 1935

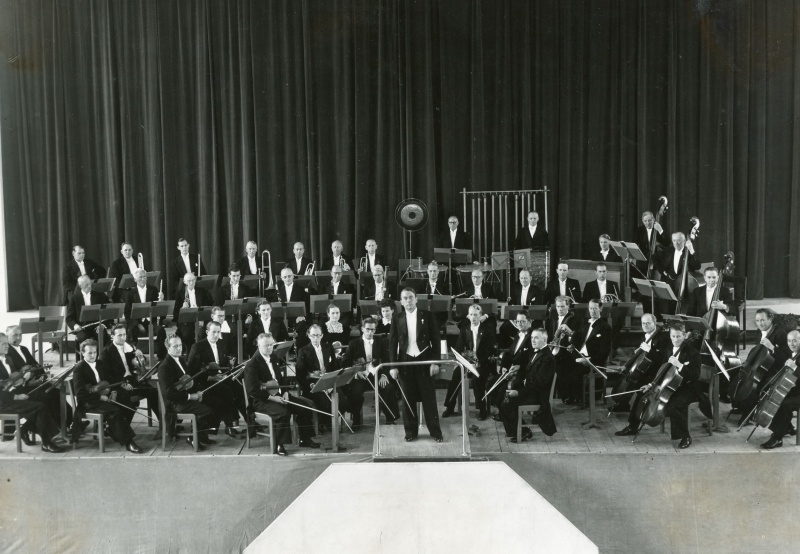
Aarhus By-orkester, c. 1945

The Aarhus Symfoniorkester (transl. Aarhus Symphony Orchestra) is the principal orchestra for the Danish city of Aarhus and one of Denmark's five regional orchestras.

Every year, the orchestra performs about 35 concerts in an around Aarhus. It also gives performances of chamber music, participates in school concerts, and is the orchestra for the Jyske Opera.

== History ==
The orchestra was established in 1935 as Aarhus By-Orkester (transl. Aarhus City Orchestra) by Thomas Jensen and Gustav Albeck. Albeck was an academic who then became the orchestra's long-time deputy chairman and chairman. Jensen was the conductor of the Aarhus Theatre and served as the orchestra's conductor-in-residence until 1957. Because of Jensen's association with the theatre, the orchestra initially found work playing at its theatrical productions. As time went on, their obligation to play for a considerable part of the year for the theatre became a hinderance.

Initially, the orchestra had no permanent venue or rehearsal facilities, giving concerts at the Aarhus Theatre, Aarhus Stadium, and the Scandinavian Center. In 1982, the By-Orkester began performing the majority of its concerts at Musikhuset Aarhus. The Symphony Hall was built at Musikhuset especially for the orchestra, which then became its permanent venue in 2007.

The ensamble formally changed its name from Aarhus By-Orkester to Aarhus Symfoniorkester in 1983. At the time it was established, the orchestra consisted of 26 musicians. Today, it has 66 musicians.

== Conductors ==
- Thomas Jensen (1935–1957)
- Per Dreier (1957–1971)
- Jorma Panula (1973–1976)
- Ole Schmidt (1978–1985)
- Norman Del Mar (1985–1988)
- Eri Klas (1991–1996)
- James Loughran (1996–2003)
- Giancarlo Andretta (2003–2012)
- Marc Soustrot (2015–2023)
- Dmitry Matvienko (2024–)
