= Danish National Symphony Orchestra =

Danish orchestra

- Radio orchestra
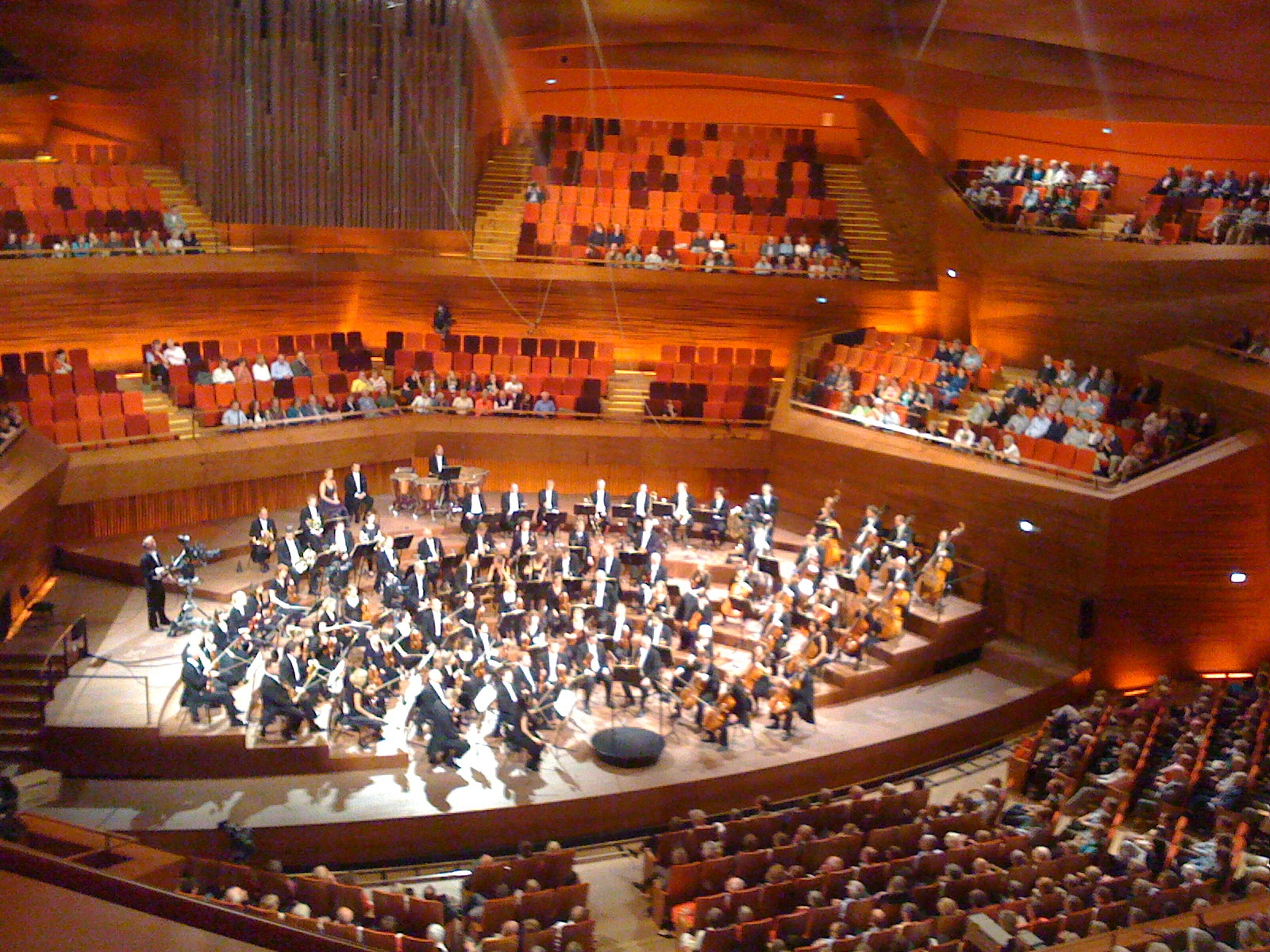
- Copenhagen Concert Hall
- Native name: DR Symfoniorkestret
- Founded: 1925; 101 years ago
- Location: Copenhagen, Denmark
- Concert hall: Copenhagen Concert Hall
- Principal conductor: Fabio Luisi
- Website: Official website

The Danish National Symphony Orchestra (DNSO; Danish: DR Symfoniorkestret), is a Danish orchestra based in Copenhagen. The DNSO is the principal orchestra of DR (Danish Broadcasting Corporation). The DRSO is based at the Koncerthuset (lit. 'The Concert House') concert hall in Copenhagen.

== History ==
The roots of the orchestra date back to the singer Emil Holm, who expressed a wish to establish a full-time symphony orchestra in Denmark. In collaboration with fellow musicians Otto Fessel, Rudolf Dietzmann, Folmer Jensen, and Wells King, the orchestra was founded in 1925, with 11 players in the ensemble and conductor Launy Grøndahl having a leadership role, though without a formal title. The orchestra grew to 30 players within a year. The orchestra performed its first public concert in 1927, and began to give weekly concerts in 1928. In 1930, Holm recruited Nikolai Malko to a key role similar to that of Grøndahl, as a conductor of the orchestra, though again without a formal title. Early concerts were at the Axelborg building. In 1931, the orchestra began to give concerts at the Stærekassen hall of the Royal Danish Theatre. After going into exile from Germany in the 1930s, Fritz Busch worked extensively as a major conductor of the orchestra in parallel with Malko, though again with no formal title. By 1948, the orchestra had attained membership of 92 musicians.

The first conductor to have the formal title of principal conductor with the orchestra was Herbert Blomstedt, from 1967 to 1977. His recording work with the orchestra included recordings of the orchestral works of Carl Nielsen. Blomstedt now has the title of æresdirigent (honorary conductor) with the DNSO. The second principal conductor, after an interregnum of 9 years, was Lamberto Gardelli, from 1986 to 1988. Thomas Dausgaard, who was the DNSO's principal guest conductor from 2001 to 2004, became principal conductor of the DNSO in 2004, the first Danish conductor to hold the title. In October 2009, Dausgaard chose to conclude his principal conductorship of the DNSO at the close of the 2010–2011 season and to take the title of æresdirigent. Past principal guest conductors of the DRSO, besides Dausgaard, have included Yuri Temirkanov, Michael Schønwandt, and Dmitri Kitaenko.

In 2010, the orchestra appointed Søren Nils Eichberg as its first-ever composer-in-residence. The orchestra has performed compositions by Eichberg such as the premiere of his Symphony No 3.

In February 2011, the DNSO announced the appointment Rafael Frühbeck de Burgos as principal conductor, effective with the 2012–2013 season, with an initial contract of three years through 2015. On 4 June 2014, Frühbeck de Burgos resigned as chief conductor of the orchestra, with immediate effect, in parallel with his retirement from conducting, because of health problems. In August 2014, the orchestra appointed Fabio Luisi as its next principal conductor, effective in 2017, with an initial contract through 2020. In May 2018, the orchestra announced the extension of Luisi's contract through 2023. In August 2020, the orchestra announced a further extension of Luisi's contract through 2026. In August 2023, the DNSO announced an additional extension of Luisi's contract, through 2029. In August 2026, the DNSO announced the newest extension of Luisi's contract, through 2032.

The orchestra has recorded commercially for such labels as DaCapo and Chandos, including music of Danish composers such as August Enna, Niels Gade, Rued Langgaard, and Per Nørgård. The orchestra has also commercially recorded such composers as Johannes Brahms.

== Principal conductors ==
- Herbert Blomstedt (1967–1977)
- (In the period 1977 - 1986, the orchestra was without a chief conductor)
- Lamberto Gardelli (1986–1988)
- Leif Segerstam (1988–1995)
- Ulf Schirmer (1995–1998)
- Gerd Albrecht (2000–2004)
- Thomas Dausgaard (2004–2011)
- Rafael Frühbeck de Burgos (2012–2014)
- Fabio Luisi (2017–present)

== Conductors laureate ==
- Herbert Blomstedt

== Danish Radio conductors affiliated with the orchestra ==
- Launy Grøndahl (1925–1956)
- Emil Reesen (1927–1936)
- Erik Tuxen (1936–1957)
- Mogens Wöldike (1950–1976)
- Thomas Jensen (1957–1963)
