= Thomas Jensen (conductor) =

Danish conductor (1898–1963)

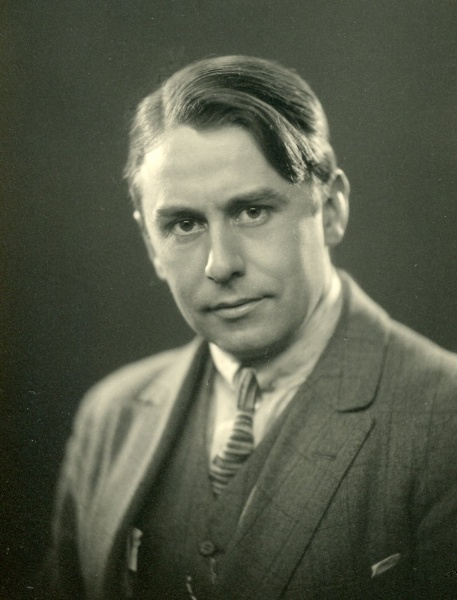
- Thomas Jensen photographed in 1931
- Born: Thomas Johannes Jensen; 25 October 1898; Copenhagen, Denmark
- Died: 13 November 1963 (aged 65); Frederiksberg, Denmark
- Education: Royal Danish Academy of Music
- Honours: Order of the Dannebrog (1943); Ingenio et arti (1952)

Thomas Jensen (Copenhagen, 25 October 1898 – Frederiksberg, 13 November 1963) was a Danish orchestra conductor and cellist. He helped found the Aarhus Byorkester, which he conducted until 1957. He then conducted the Danish National Symphony Orchestra from 1957 until his death.

Jensen initially studied and performed as a cellist, before transitioning to work as a conductor. As a student, he trained with Carl Nielsen and his style as a conductor is said to have closely resembled that of Nielsen's. In 1952, Jensen received the Ingenio et Arti award from Fredrik IX. He received the Läkerols kulturpris in 1961.

== Personal life ==
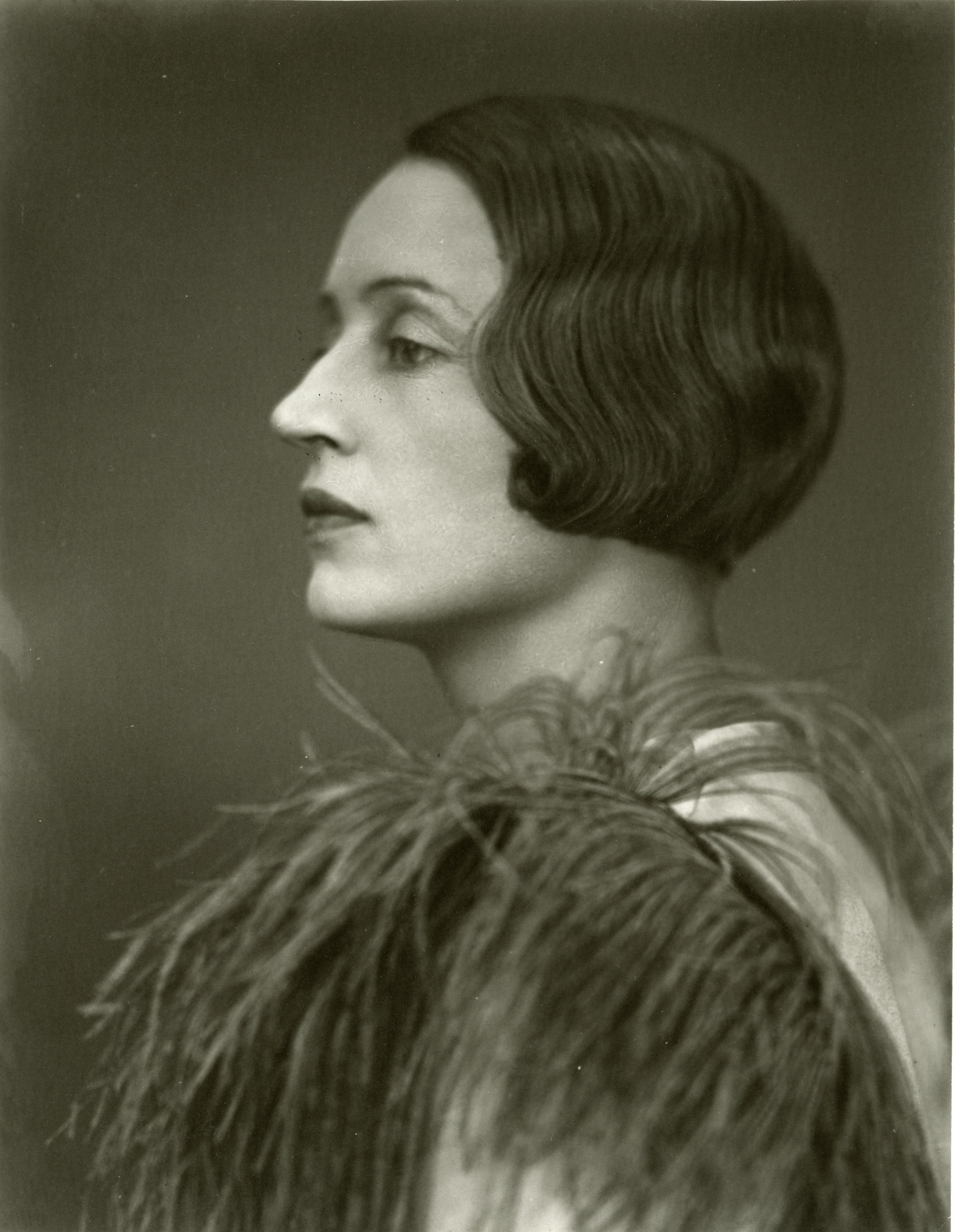
Photograph of Jensen's wife, Besse Giersing, from 1933

Thomas Johannes Jensen was born on 25 October 1898 in Copenhagen to Astrid Corta Mary Nielsen and machinist Niels Peder Jensen. In 1912, he was admitted to the Danish Conservatory of Music. There, he studied the organ and cello under the tutelage of Otto Malling and Carl Nielsen, among others.

On 21 December 1928, he married Besse Giersing in Aarhus. She was a painter who was an actress at Aarhus Theatre at the time they met. Giersing died in 1944.

== Career ==
Jensen's first permanent position as a musician was with the Nordvästra Skånes Orkesterförening in Helsingborg, where he was a solo cellist from 1917 to 1919. In 1920, be became one of three permanent cellists with the Tivoli Concert Hall Orchestra. While performing in ensambles as a cellist, Jensen also began conducting for amateur orchestas like Eufrosyne, as well as Nørrebros Theater. He also traveled to Dresden and Paris for brief periods of study.

In 1927, he left his position at the Tivoli Concert Hall to formally become a conductor in Aarhus. Initially, he worked as the conductor for the orchestra of the Aarhus Theatre. In 1935, he founded the Aarhus Byorkester (transl. Aarhus City Orchestra) alongside Gustav Albeck, an academic. He was then conductor-in-residence of the orchestra until 1957. Initially, the orchestra struggled. It couldn't afford many musicians and was only modestly funded by local politicians. Because of his association with Aarhus Theatre, the orchestra initially found work playing at its theatrical productions. In 1947 he had also helped establish Den Jyske Opera.

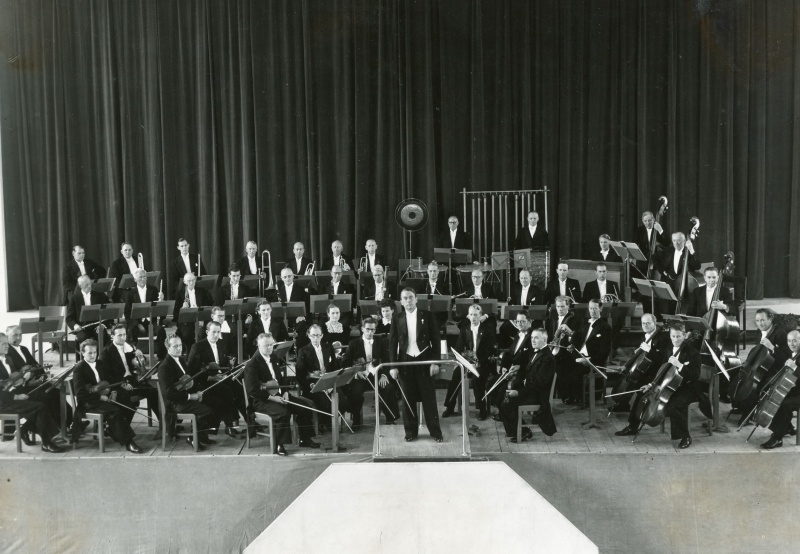
Jensen as conductor for the Aarhus By-Orkester, c. 1945

Despite having received offers for permanent conducting positions in Copenhagen, he elected to remain in Aarhus with the Byorkester. During this period, he guest-conducted the Royal Danish Orchestra and the Danish National Symphony Orchestra, and was the second conductor of the Tivoli Concert Hall Orchestra. In 1957, a dispute over the Aarhus Byorkester's venue and the musician's poor compensation led Jensen to resign in frustration and return to Copenhagen.

Back in Copenhagen, he was offered a position as the conductor of the Danish National Symphony Orchestra. When the orchestra travelled to Paris in October 1962, he fell gravely ill on the train journey, causing hearing loss. His hearing became a recurring issue for the orchestra, and Jensen privately considered resigning. Because of his failing health, the last few years of his career saw him conduct only a quarter of the orchestra's regular concerts. He remained in his position until his death in on 3 November 1963 at his home in Frederiksberg. He was buried at Solbjerg Park Cemetery.

== Style and legacy ==
Jensen is best remembered (with Erik Tuxen and Launy Grøndahl) as one of the pioneers of the music of Carl Nielsen. As an orchestral cellist he took part in the first performances of Nielsen's 4th and 5th symphonies, and also sat in on many rehearsals of Nielsen. Nielsen's daughters held that Jensen was the conductor whose performances came closest to Nielsen's own. He also played in the orchestra when Sibelius conducted his own music in the Danish capital in 1924 and 1926.

Jensen made his recording debut in 1937 with lighter music by Knudåge Riisager and the year later led Svendsen's Romance, with Carlo Andersen playing the solo violin part. From 1937 to 1943 Jensen recorded over 60 sides of music for HMV, Odeon and Tono. In Aarhus he recorded works by Kuhlau, Tarp, Elgar, Massenet, Møller, Debussy, Tchaikovsky and Smetana. His first recordings of Nielsen date from 1941 (the Suite for String Orchestra) with the Helios overture and orchestral opera extracts in the following year. Many of Jensen's classical pieces were inspired from the greats before him such as Mozart and his personal favourite, Ludwig van Beethoven.

Cultural offices
Preceded by no predecessor	Principal Conductor, Aarhus Symphony Orchestra; 1935–1957	Succeeded by Per Dreier
