= Herbert Blomstedt =

Swedish conductor (1927–2026)

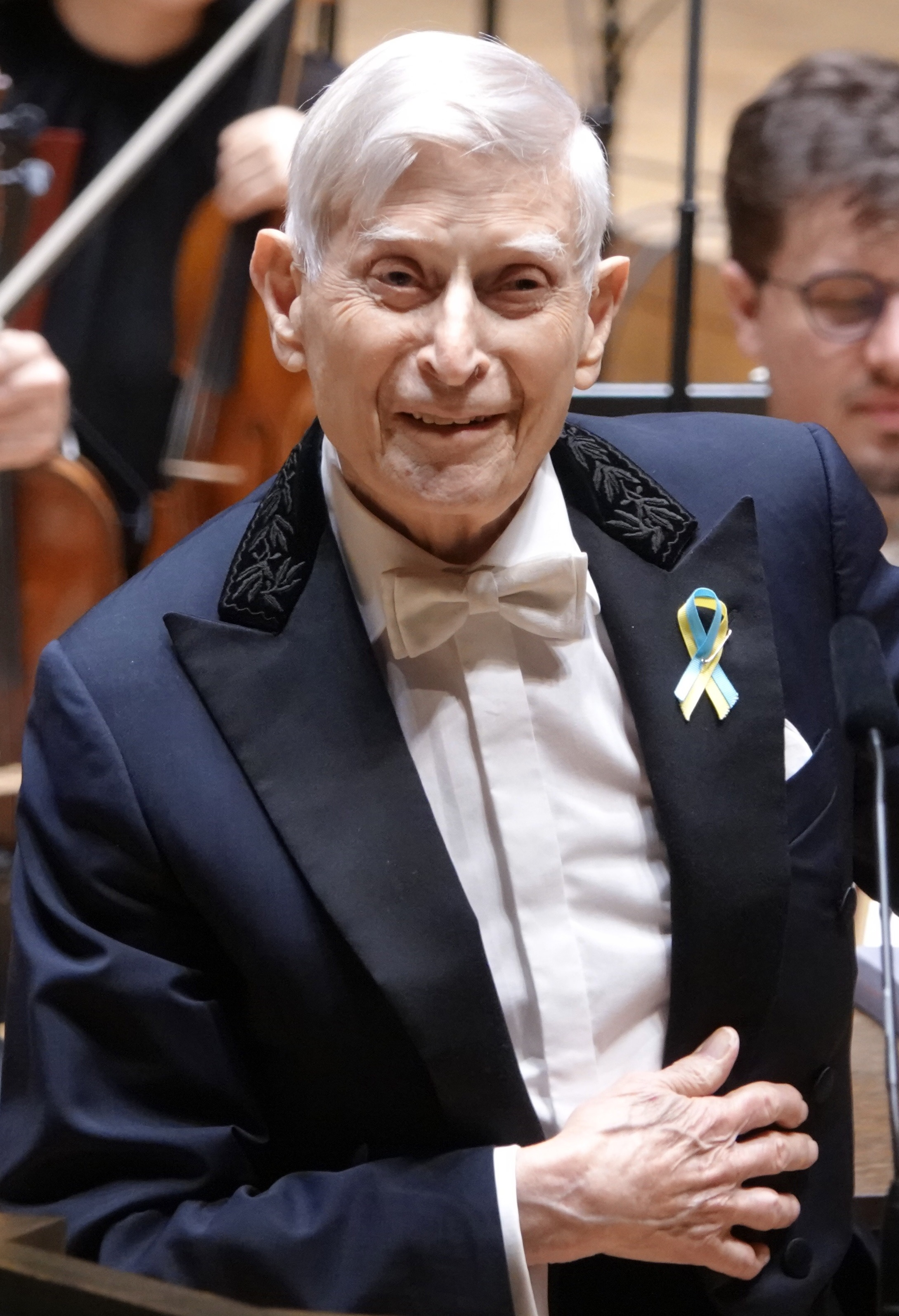
- Blomstedt in 2023
- Born: Herbert Thorsson Blomstedt; 11 July 1927; Springfield, Massachusetts, U.S.
- Died: 4 November 2026 (aged 99); Gothenburg, Sweden
- Citizenship: Sweden; United States
- Education: Stockholm Royal College of Music; University of Uppsala; Juilliard School
- Occupation: Conductor
- Organizations: Norrköping Symphony; Staatskapelle Dresden; San Francisco Symphony; Gewandhaus Orchestra
- Spouse: Waltraud Regina Peterson (m. 1955; died 2003)
- Awards: Léonie Sonning Music Prize; Opus Klassik; Praemium Imperiale

Herbert Thorsson Blomstedt (Swedish: [ˈhæ̌rːbɛʈ ˈblʊ̌mːstɛt]; 11 July 1927 – 4 November 2026) was a Swedish and American conductor. Over the course of his 70-year career, he served as the principal conductor of orchestras, first in Scandinavia, where his first post was from 1954 with the Norrköping Symphony Orchestra, followed by tenures with the Oslo Philharmonic Orchestra, the Danish National Symphony Orchestra, and the Swedish Radio Symphony Orchestra. When he became principal conductor of the Staatskapelle Dresden in 1975, he was recognised internationally, and later led the San Francisco Symphony, the North German Radio Symphony Orchestra, and the Leipzig Gewandhaus Orchestra. He conducted his last concert in May 2026, at age 98.

Blomstedt was noted for his performances of symphonic works by German and Austrian composers including Beethoven, Anton Bruckner and Gustav Mahler, and for championing music by Scandinavian composers, especially Jean Sibelius and Carl Nielsen. He conducted "using minimal, refined gestures without a baton", believing that an orchestra needed "a musician to communicate with". Based on his faith, he maintained an attitude of "calmness, a long breath and serene kindness". Blomstedt received many awards for recordings and his life's work.

== Biography ==
=== Early life and education ===
Herbert Blomstedt was born on 11 July 1927 in Springfield, Massachusetts. His father, Adolf Blomstedt, was a Swedish Seventh-day Adventist missionary, and his mother, Alida Armintha Thorson, was a pianist from Golden, Colorado. He had an elder brother and a younger sister. Two years after his birth, the family returned to Europe, first briefly to Sweden and then for five years to Finland. In 1932 he accompanied his mother to Vienna, where she took lessons with Moritz Rosenthal. In 1935 the family returned to Sweden, settling in Gothenburg, where he took his first violin lessons with Lars Fermæus, principal violinist of the Gothenburg Symphony Orchestra. He listened regularly to German broadcasts of orchestral music on Sunday mornings, remembering one especially: Max Reger's Variations and Fugue on a Theme by Mozart, played by the Staatskapelle Dresden conducted by Karl Böhm. He was fascinated by the sound of the orchestra.

Blomstedt studied violin and organ at the Stockholm Royal College of Music and musicology at the University of Uppsala. He was a member of the choir at the Royal College, where he had a chance to conduct two movements from the Brahms Requiem. It made him interested in conducting. He studied further, contemporary music at the Darmstädter Ferienkurse in 1949, Baroque music with Paul Sacher at the Schola Cantorum Basiliensis, and further conducting studies with Igor Markevitch, Jean Morel at the Juilliard School, and Leonard Bernstein at Tanglewood's Berkshire Music Center.

=== Scandinavia ===
Blomstedt won the Koussevitzky Conducting Prize in 1953 and the Salzburg Conducting Competition in 1955. He conducted the Royal Stockholm Philharmonic Orchestra first in 1954, in a program with Bach's Orchestral Suite in B minor and Hindemith's Mathis der Maler.

Blomstedt was music director or principal conductor of the Norrköping Symphony Orchestra (1954–1962), Oslo Philharmonic Orchestra (1962–1968), Danish Radio Symphony (1967–1977), with whom he recorded symphonies and other orchestral music by Carl Nielsen, and Swedish Radio Symphony (1977–1982).

=== Staatskepelle Dresden ===
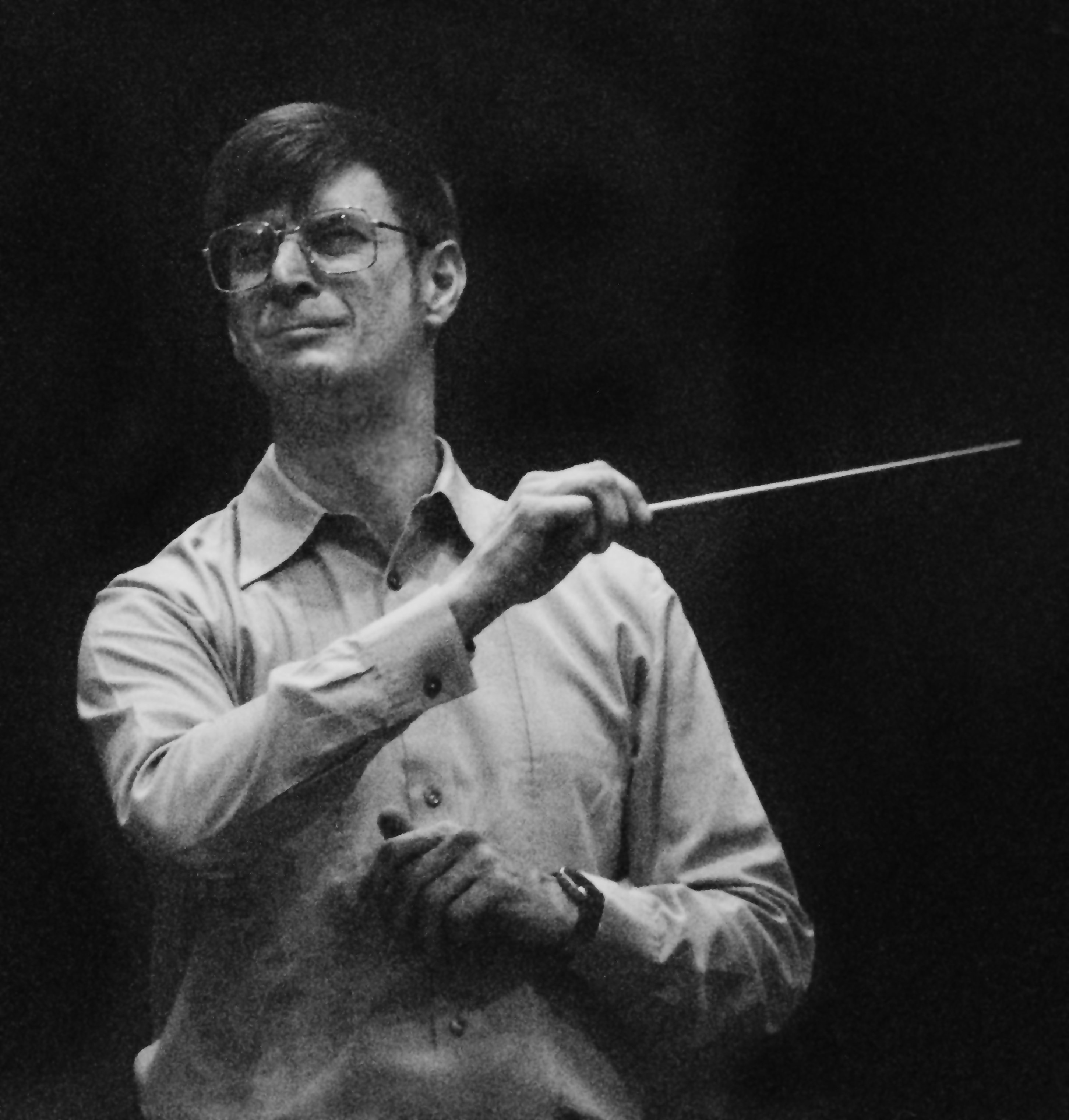
Blomstedt in rehearsal in Bamberg, 1982

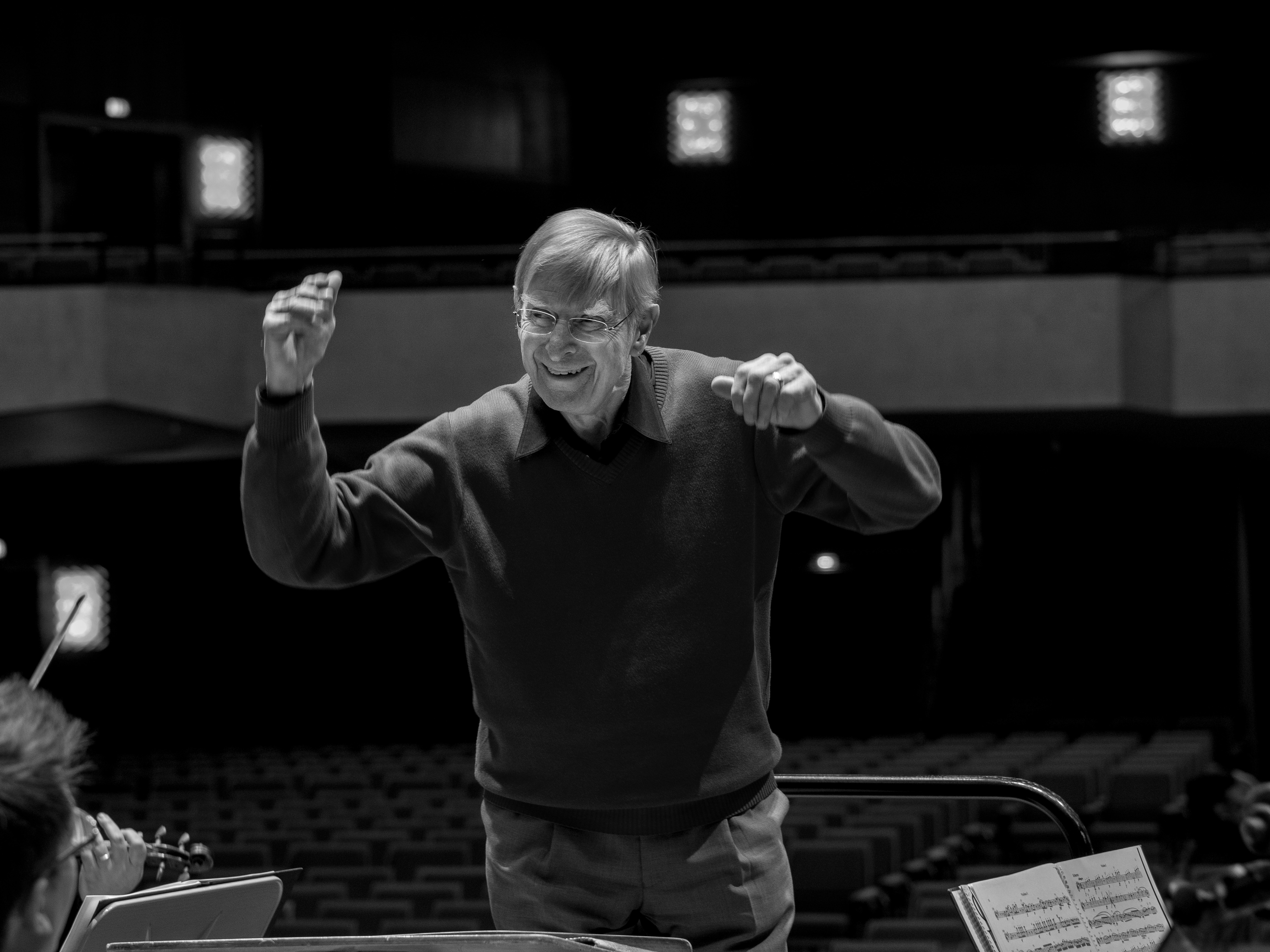
Blomstedt in rehearsal in Bamberg

Blomstedt conducted the Staatskapelle Dresden (SD) first in April 1969. He stepped in for the Czech conductor Martin Turnovský who had emigrated to Austria in protest of the Warsaw Pact invasion of Czechoslovakia ending the Prague Spring, and conducted his own program with music by Hindemith, Brahms and Nielsen. Blomstedt conducted his first staged opera with the orchestra, Beethoven's Fidelio, in 1973. When he was invited to become chief conductor of the Staatskapelle he thought about it for two years because he had never worked in a communist country. He knew that he wanted to keep his residence in Sweden, because his children should not be educated in socialist schools. Blomstedt took the position in 1975, with responsibility also for the Saxon State Opera, and remained until 1985. He felt that at the time he was still a beginner, in his late 40s, who had never conducted an opera. He saw that music offered a different world in an unfree country, and that the musicians played with "existential absoluteness", "almost obsessed with their own musical standards".

Blomstedt conducted the SD in a wide repertoire, including their specialties, works by Richard Wagner and Richard Strauss, but expanded to both their baroque tradition and world premieres. On 27 October 1983 he conducted the Staatskapelle in the world premiere of Jörg Herchet's Komposition für Horn und Orchester with Peter Damm as the horn soloist. In Dresden he conducted new productions of Mozart's Die Entführung aus dem Serail (1976, with Carolyn Smith-Meyer as Konstanze), Debussy's Pelléas et Mélisande (1978), and Tchaikovsky's Eugene Onegin (1980), directed by Harry Kupfer.

Blomstedt and the Staatskapelle made many well-regarded recordings, including works by Strauss and the complete Beethoven and Schubert symphonies. Blomstedt led the orchestra on international tours including to countries of the Eastern Bloc. In 1983 they toured the United States for the first time, both to New York City and to small provincial towns. Blomstedt travelled by bus with the musicians. Blomstedt conducted the first concert at the rebuilt Semperoper, the traditional Palm Sunday concert with Beethoven's Ninth Symphony on 30 March 1985,

Blomstedt's first concert with the Berlin Philharmonic was in 1976, also the debut there of the pianist Krystian Zimerman. He appeared as a guest with the Vienna Philharmonic in the mid 1980s, programming Beethoven, Bruckner and Franz Berwald's Sinfonie singulière.

=== San Francisco Symphony ===
Blomstedt was music director of the San Francisco Symphony from 1985 to 1995, leading the orchestra on regular tours of Europe and Asia. They made numerous recordings for London/Decca. They received a Gramophone Award in 1991 for Nielsen's Symphonies Nos. 2 and 3. Robert Layton wrote then:

These are quite simply the best performances of either symphony to have appeared for a very long time … the San Francisco orchestra plays with all the enthusiasm of first discovery and there is splendid concentration and fire. Throughout both symphonies it is the underlying current on which this music is borne along that is so expertly judged. Affirmative, powerful readings, very well balanced by the Decca engineers.

Two recordings earned a Grammy Award for Best Choral Performance, in 1993 Orff's Carmina Burana with the San Francisco Boys Chorus and the San Francisco Girls Chorus, and in 1996 the Brahms Requiem. Other recordings received a Grand Prix du Disque, as well as awards from Belgium, Germany, and Japan.

=== North German Radio Symphony, Gewandhausorchester ===
Blomstedt was principal conductor of the North German Radio Symphony from 1996 to 1998, and of the Leipzig Gewandhaus Orchestra from 1998 to 2005. Wolfgang Stähr noted in the Neue Zürcher Zeitung that he developed the orchestra's "approach to performance, technique, artistic identity, sound and freedom of expression". He felt that sound is defined by tempo, and differentiated the school of Mendelssohn of brisk, lively tempos and Richard Wagner's cult of sublime slowness, which he followed a while in Dresden, but soon changed back, especially in Leipzig as a successor of Mendelssohn as Gewandhauskapellmeister. Blomstedt introduced music by Nielsen and Wilhelm Stenhammar, and they recorded the complete symphonies by Beethoven and Bruckner.

=== Honours, style ===
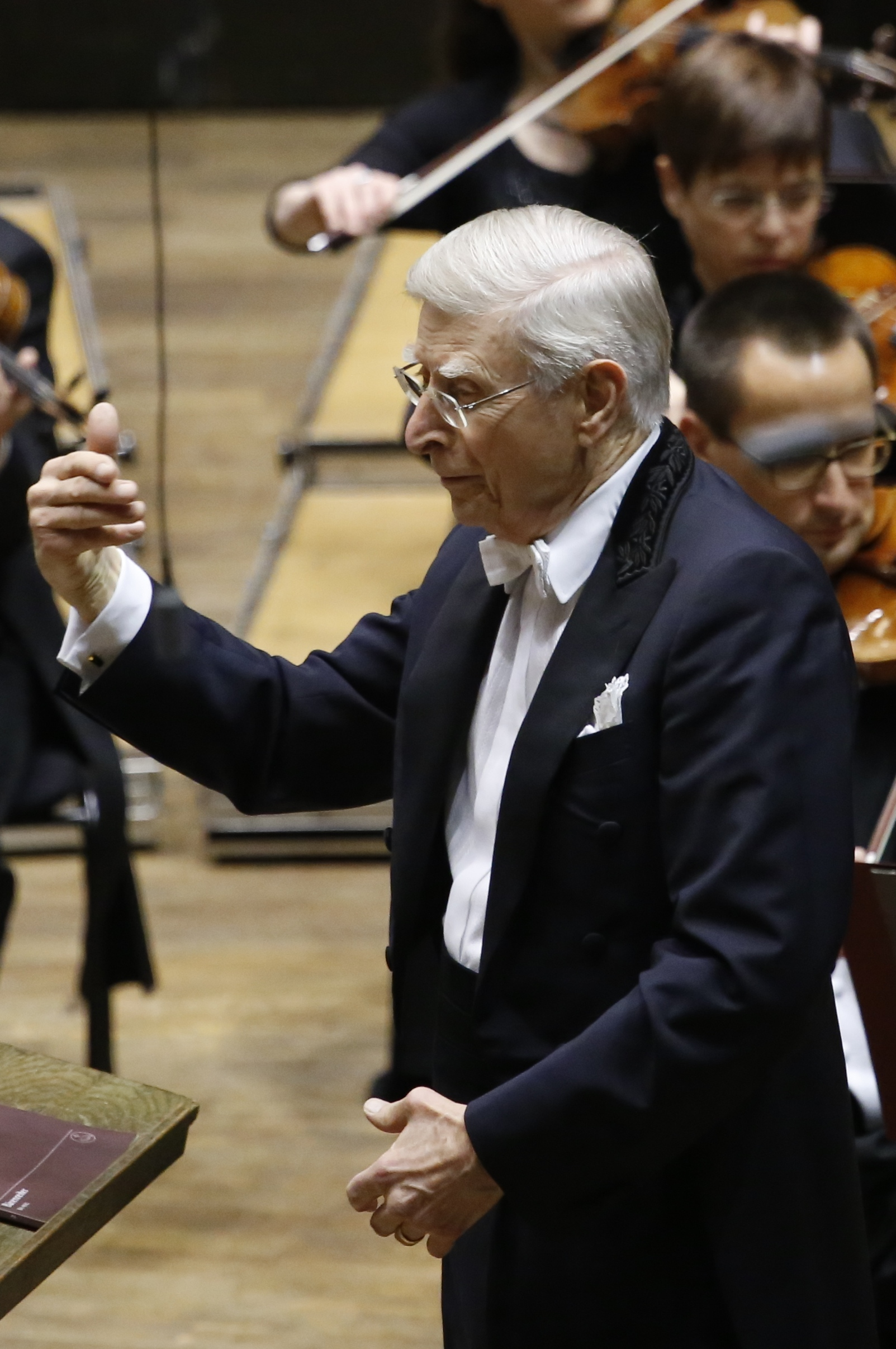
Blomstedt at the Gewandhaus, 2015

Blomstedt held the title of conductor laureate with the San Francisco Symphony and was honorary conductor of the Bamberg Symphony, Danish National Symphony Orchestra, NHK Symphony, Swedish Radio Symphony, Leipzig Gewandhaus Orchestra, Staatskapelle Dresden, Oslo Philharmonic Orchestra and the Norrköping Symphony Orchestra. Blomstedt was most noted for his performances of German and Austrian composers, such as Beethoven, Schubert, Felix Mendelssohn, Johannes Brahms, Anton Bruckner, Strauss and Paul Hindemith, and also as a champion of Scandinavian composers, such as Berwald, Nielsen, Edvard Grieg, and Jean Sibelius. David Hurwitz of Classics Today has called Blomstedt's recordings of the Schubert symphonies with the Staatskapelle Dresden and of the Sibelius symphonies with the San Francisco Symphony "reference recordings."

A devout Seventh-day Adventist, Blomstedt did not rehearse on Friday nights or Saturdays, the Sabbath in Seventh-day Adventism. He conducted concerts without that restriction, as he considered performances to be an expression of his religious devotion. He began to conduct without a baton in his later years, after he had come to a rehearsal accidentally without a baton and found it too embarrassing to return and get it, and discovered that it worked well. He studied the score for every piece again before a performance even if he knew it from memory. His conducting style has been described as "disciplined and serene, using minimal, refined gestures without a baton, as he believes the orchestra needs a musician to communicate with". Gerald Felber wrote in his obituary for the Frankfurter Allgemeine Zeitung that he conducted with "calmness, a long breath and serene kindness", which served the epic-narrative works by Nielsen and Sibelius and also Bruckner's "cosmic conceptions" well. He said about orchestra players: "Mysterious abilities lie dormant within musicians; one ought to treat them a little like angels. They are messengers of something divine."

=== Later career ===
In 2023 Blomstedt conducted the Gewandhausorchester in Bruckner's Seventh Symphony for the closing concert of the Rheingau Musik Festival at Eberbach Abbey. In his last concert in London, in 2024, he conducted Mahler's Ninth Symphony with the Philharmonia Orchestra. A reviewer for Classic FM described him as "in complete control", using "contained but crystal-clear gestures" to "communicate his expressive thoughts". Reviewer Martin Kettle wrote for The Guardian:

Yes, it took a while to get into its irresistible stride, and the ländler second movement briefly lost momentum. But the hurtling rondo was terrifyingly vivid and the final adagio Olympian. It was one of the finest Mahler Ninths one is likely to hear.

At age 98, he continued to conduct, and in February 2025, he completed a series of concerts with the San Francisco Symphony. In October 2025, he conducted a series of concerts with the NHK Symphony Orchestra in Tokyo. In April 2026 Blomstedt conducted the Berlin Philharmonic in three concerts of Bruckner's Seventh Symphony. In May 2026 he conducted two performances of Mahler's Ninth Symphony with the Detroit Symphony at Orchestra Hall. Also in May 2026, he returned to San Francisco to perform a series of three concerts with the same symphony. Blomstedt conducted the first of the series. In the third movement, the music came to a halt; he was given a different seat with armrests, and was able to resume the performance. It became his last concert as he was advised not to complete the series.

=== Personal life ===
Blomstedt married Waltraud "Traute" Peterson in 1955. They had four daughters and later seven grandchildren. He described his wife as a music lover who usually travelled with him to concerts. They had a residence in Lucerne from the 1980s. Blomstedt was a vegetarian and a bibliophile. Stähr noted that he "read Descartes and Kierkegaard and had taken the Bible to heart, admired the entomologist Jean-Henri Fabre and was fascinated by the migratory behaviour of swifts". He liked to play the organ in church services. His wife died in 2003. He later moved back to Sweden, to a house in Bengtstorp, where the family had spent their summers for half a century, and an apartment in Gothenburg.

Blomstedt died in Gothenburg, Sweden, on 4 November 2026, at the age of 99.

== Awards ==
Blomstedt received an honorary doctorate from the University of Gothenburg in 1999.

In 2026, Blomstedt was honored with a bust at Berwaldhallen in Stockholm.

- 1993 and 1996 Grammy Award for Best Choral Performance
- 2007 Knight of the Order of the Dannebrog
- 2014 Rolf Schock Prize – Musical arts
- 2016 Léonie Sonning Music Prize
- 2017 Brahms Prize
- 2022 Rheingau Musik Preis
- 2022 Knight Commander's Cross of the Order of Merit of the Federal Republic of Germany
- 2023 Opus Klassik for life's work
- 2026 Praemium Imperiale in the category Music

=== Memberships ===
- 1965 Royal Swedish Academy of Music
- 2019 Honorary member of the Vienna Philharmonic
- 2026 Honorary member of the Sächsische Akademie der Künste

== Legacy ==
The Royal Swedish Academy of Music established on Blomstedt's 80th birthday the SEK 50,000 Herbert Blomstedt Scholarship, given biennially to young Swedish conductors. Blomstedt passed most of his extended library of around 35,000 volumes to the Gothenburg University Library.

== Recordings ==
- Herbert Blomstedt – Complete Decca recordings, Decca, [London], 2023, 33 CDs OCLC 1381342550

Cultural offices
Preceded by Heinz Freudenthal	Principal Conductor, Norrköping Symphony Orchestra; 1954–1962	Succeeded by Everett Lee
Preceded by Fritz Busch	Chief Conductor, Danish National Symphony Orchestra; 1967–1977	Succeeded by Lamberto Gardelli
Preceded by Sergiu Celibidache	Principal Conductor, Swedish Radio Symphony Orchestra; 1977–1982	Succeeded by Esa-Pekka Salonen
Preceded by John Eliot Gardiner	Principal Conductor, North German Radio Symphony Orchestra; 1996–1998	Succeeded by Christoph Eschenbach
