= Kontrapunkt =

Danish classical music record label

Edition Kontrapunkt (the Danish, Swedish, Norwegian and also German word for counterpoint) is a Danish classical music record label based in Klampenborg and founded in 1987. The label is owned by Steeplechase Records, the Danish jazz label.

The label has made the first recordings of many major works by Danish composers, including the first recordings of Ib Nørholm's symphonies in 1993.
