= Douglas Bostock =

English conductor (born 1955)

- Born: 1955 (age 70–71); Cheshire, England
- Occupation: conductor
- Website: http://www.douglasbostock.net

Douglas Bostock (born 1955) is a British classical music conductor.

== Education ==
Douglas Bostock was born in Cheshire, England. He was educated at Sheffield University and in London with Sir Adrian Boult. He was one of the last private pupils of Adrian Boult during his final years.

== Career ==
Douglas Bostock is currently the Principal Conductor of the Aargau Symphony Orchestra in Switzerland and Principal Guest Conductor of Czech Chamber Philharmonic. He was the Principal Conductor of Tokyo Kosei Wind Orchestra from 2000 to 2006.

He was Music Director and Principal Conductor of the Carlsbad Symphony Orchestra in the Czech Republic from 1991 to 1998. He has served as the Principal Guest Conductor of the Czech Chamber Philharmonic (1992 to 2009) and the Munich Symphony Orchestra (1999 to 2006). Since 2003, he has been Music Director of the Hallwyl Opera Festival in Switzerland.

In April 2012, Maestro Bostock took up the position as Guest Professor and Conductor at the Tokyo University of the Arts. He was invited to conduct a concert with the Geidai Symphony Orchestra in the presence of the Emperor and Empress of Japan for the third time.
