= Dacapo Records =

- Founded: 1989
- Distributor: Naxos
- Genre: Classical, jazz, experimental
- Country of origin: Denmark
- Location: Copenhagen
- Official website: www.dacapo-records.dk/en/

Dacapo Records is a Danish classical music and new music record label. It was founded in 1989 to promote the classical and new music of Denmark and represents itself as "the Danish National label" ("Danmarks nationale pladeselskab"). The board includes university and Danish Radio appointees. Dacapo also produces jazz and experimental music.

== Major projects ==
Dacapo's publications have included several large recording projects, in particular the Danmarks Nationale Musikantologi, and Den danske sangskat (Treasury of Danish Songs).

== Dacapo music store ==
Dacapo Records' web store offers the label's full catalogue in various formats, including as mp3 format and the superior 24-bit digital audio.

== Artists ==
The label's artists include:

- David Abell
- Anne Marie Fjord Abildskov
- Hans Abrahamsen
- Matthias Aeschbacher
- David Alberman
- Jens Albinus
- Aldubarán
- Rinaldo Alessandrini
- Alpha
- Birgitte Alsted
- Frode Andersen
- Kai Normann Andersen
- Stig Fogh Andersen
- Karl-Gustav Andersson
- Mogens Andresen
- Ole Edvard Antonsen
- Arditti String Quartet
- Arild String Quartet
- Bodil Arnesen
- Ars Nova Copenhagen
- Art of Brass Copenhagen
- Max Artved
- Britt Marie Aruhn
- Lars Arvidson
- Signe Asmussen
- Athelas Sinfonietta Copenhagen
- Musica Ficta
