= Fynsk Foraar =

Choral composition by Carl Nielsen

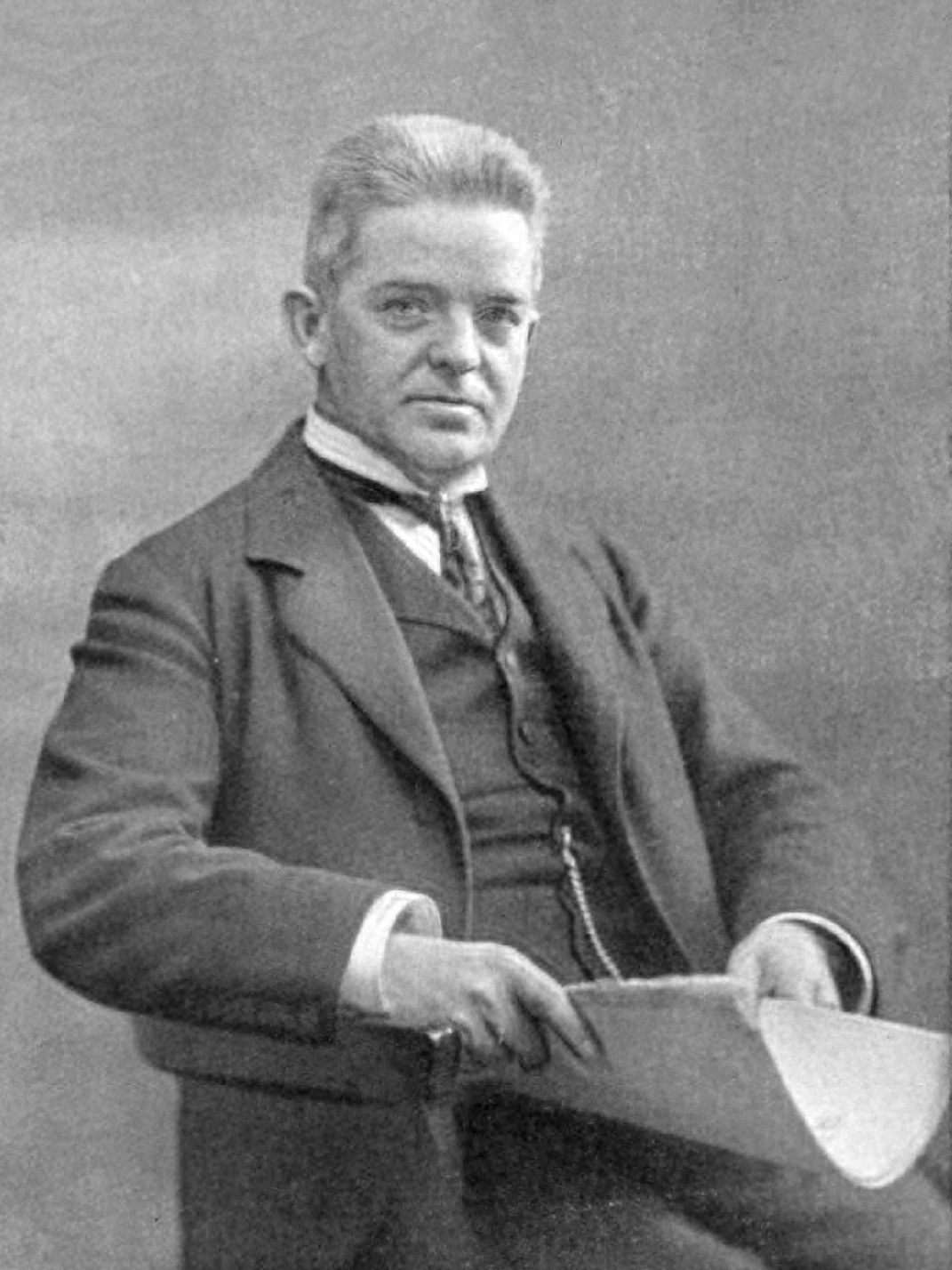
Carl Nielsen in 1917

Fynsk Foraar (Springtime on Funen), for soloists, chorus and orchestra, Opus 42, is Carl Nielsen's last major choral work. Written to accompany a prizewinning text by Aage Berntsen, it was first performed in Odense's Kvæghal (Cattle Hall) on 8 July 1922 where it was conducted by Georg Høeberg.

== Background ==
Aage Berntsen, a medical doctor and a writer, was the winner of a competition arranged around 1917 by the Dansk Korforening (Danish Choral Society) for a text on Danish history or landscape which would subsequently be set to music by Carl Nielsen. Several years went by before the composer could find the time or inclination to work on the piece, especially as he was in the middle of composing his Fifth Symphony. Indeed, on 19 August 1921, he wrote: "For some time I have not felt very comfortable because I could not get started on the choral work which I must have done by 1 September, and every day I considered throwing it away and informing the board of all these combined societies that I had to beg off... But then one day I found the tone and the style, which will be a light mixture of lyricism and humour, and now it is well in hand and will soon be finished.

Only with the help of his pupil Nancy Dalberg, who had helped with fair-copying the large score for Aladdin, was he able to meet his deadline. On 3 September 1921, he wrote to his wife: "My new choral piece has turned out to be a really big piece of work (42 pages in the piano arrangement) and has now actually been delivered on time. But I have also worked a lot and with a certain lightness. The poet has called it Springtime on Funen but I also give it a subtitle, Lyrical Humoresque, which suggests that the style is light and lively... Now I will continue with my interrupted symphony."

== Reception ==
The first performance of Fynsk Foraar was at the opening concert of Third National Choral Festival which took place on 8 July 1922 in the huge Odense Kvæghal (Cattle Hall), specially renamed Markedshallen (Market Hall) for the occasion. The circumstances were not ideal. While Nielsen had envisaged the work for a fairly small orchestra and choir, there were 80 in the orchestra and several hundred in the choirs from Funen and Copenhagen. The hall itself could accommodate up to 10,000 people.

The day after the concert, Politiken commented: "Enthusiastic applause rewarded the choral work. The composer and poet were called for in vain. Neither was present." Nielsen had in fact explained a few days earlier that he was not feeling up to travelling to Odense. Most reviewers agreed that the work had not been performed in the right venue. N.O. Raasted, writing for a local newspaper Fyns Tidende was frank: "So light and graceful, so witty and veiled is the language spoken here that several of the work's beautiful passages could only be lost in a performance under such circumstances! We look forward to hearing it all again in the not too distant future if the work can be presented in circumstances that are more favourable to its appreciation."

Another local newspaper Fyens Stiftstidende commented on the work's regional tone: "There was the greatest interest in the next item in the concert, Aage Berntsen’s and Carl Nielsen’s never-before-performed work for soloists, choir and orchestra, Springtime on Funen. Rarely have a poet and composer been so fortunate in finding the fullest expression of the distinctive atmosphere and emotional life of a Danish region. The Funen islanders totally lack the capacity to take themselves too seriously. As true sons of the Funen soil, Berntsen and Carl Nielsen have therefore made Springtime on Funen a humoresque; but no less distinctively, the humoresque bears the stamp of the lyrical, for among the Danes the people of Funen remain those who abandon themselves most easily to the play of the emotions."

In the meantime, Nielsen was planning his own performance of the work at the Music Society (Musikforeningen) in Copenhagen. In a letter dated 29 June 1922 to the composer Rudolf Simonsen, he describes how he would like it performed under his own baton: "III myself: Springtime on Funen small orchestra: light and gay and graceful as my humble talents can manage." The work was indeed presented by the Music Society at the first concert of the season on 21 November 1922.

Axel Kjærulf, writing in Politiken, was full of praise for the work: "It is enchantingly formed, so light and bright, so full and fertile, so simple and inward. In each strophe one recognizes Carl Nielsen’s Danish tone, but here sweeter and truer than before. He is intimate with everything — and the rest of us get as close as possible to this often so inaccessible man — and grow fond of him."

== Music ==
Fynsk Foraar is often considered Nielsen's most popular choral work, especially in Denmark. Nielsen gave it the subtitle "lyric humoresque", aptly describing its simple, folk-like idiom and its compact form. Scored for a four-part chorus, soprano, tenor, and baritone soloists, a children's chorus and a small chamber orchestra, the 18-minute cantata consists of several independent sections tied together with orchestral transitions. The choral writing is largely diatonic and homophonic. The solo melodies contain frequent alternations between major and minor tonalities.

This work is often cited as the most Danish of all Nielsen's compositions; this seems borne out as the chorus and soloists extol a countryside replete with grass, water lilies, and gnarled apple trees blooming.

The cantata is divided into the following sections:

- Som en græsgrøn plet (Like a grass-green spot)
- Å se, nu kommer våren (O see, spring is coming)
- Den milde dag er lys og lang (The mild day is bright and long)
- Der har vi den aldrende sol igen (There we see the ageing sun again)
- Til dansen går pigerne arm i arm (To the dance, girls walk arm in arm)
- Jeg tænder min pibe i aftenfred (I light my pipe in the evening's peace)
- Og månen jeg ser (And I see the moon)
- Den blinde spillemand (The blind fiddler)
- Nu vil vi ud og lege (Now we will go and play)
- De gamle (The old folk)
- Dansevisen (Dance song)
