= Nancy Dalberg =

Danish female composer (1881–1949)

Nancy Dalberg (born Nancy Hansen, 6 July 1881 – 28 September 1949) was a Danish composer. Born into a wealthy family, she studied under notable composers such as Johan Svendsen and Carl Nielsen, the latter becoming a good friend and a significant figure in her life. In addition to the orchestral works mentioned, she wrote around fifty songs, including three for voice and orchestra.

== Life ==
Nancy Dalberg was born at the estate Mullerup on the Danish island of Funen (Fyn), where she was raised in a manor house. Her father, Christian D. A. Hansen, was a well-off manufacturer as the founder of Chr. Hansen, a factory for chemical products for the food industry, which is still one of Denmark's leading companies. The family was always well-off financially, which meant that Nancy didn't have to worry about her income, which her music most of the time couldn't promise.

From a young age she was steered toward a musical career, partly due to her acquaintance with the composer Hilda Sehested, who was twenty years her senior and from the nearby Broholm estate. As was customary, she received private piano instruction from Ove Christensen, making her debut in 1907. Unfortunately her father refused her wish to study at the Royal Conservatory in Copenhagen.

Following her marriage in 1901 and relocation to Copenhagen, she continued her piano studies with Ove Christiansen. Unfortunately, apart from her father's hindrance, her promising career was never to be because she suffered chronic tenosynovitis. From 1909 to 1911, she studied music theory and composition under Johan Svendsen, shortly with Fini Henriques and from 1913 onwards with Carl Nielsen, who became a significant figure in her life. Nielsen played in the ensemble at the first private performance of Dalberg's debut string quartet in 1914 at her home. He also conducted the premieres of three of her orchestral works: Scherzo for String Orchestra Op. 6, the Symphony in C-sharp minor (1917), and Capriccio for Orchestra (1918). Nielsen trusted her technical skills and allowed her to orchestrate parts of his operas Aladdin and Springtime on Funen (Fynsk Foraar).

Most of her works were written between 1914 and 1935. Among these was Marianne Sinclair's song, intended for an opera based on Selma Lagerlöf's Gösta Berling's Saga. However, since the opera rights had already been granted to another party, the project was abandoned. Her chamber music includes several small pieces for violin and piano, as well as for cello and piano, but it is her three string quartets that have received the most recognition.

She was the first Danish woman composer to write a symphony. It was premiered to critical acclaim although it was noted with surprise that Dalberg was a woman. The two strongest influences that can be heard in her music are those of Svendsen and Nielsen although she writes entirely with her own voice.

Nancy Dalberg is often remembered more for her role as Nielsen's assistant than for her own compositions. This may be attributed to the traditional female role she was compelled into by her social environment and seemingly accepted. Her works were not evaluated on their own merits but often viewed as skillful enough that even a man might have produced them. Additionally, caring for her mentally ill husband increasingly drained her energy in the last two decades of her life. In this respect, her fate mirrors that of her fellow female composer Tekla Wandall. However, unlike Wandall, there was no social necessity forcing Dalberg to pursue music. She stopped composing during the 1930s.

Her chamber music has received the most attention and one of her three string quartets, her Second String Quartet in G minor, Op.14 has entered the repertoire of many Scandinavian ensembles and was recorded on a Dacapo CD in 1999. (Dacapo 8.224138) The parts and score to this work were republished by Edition Silvertrust in June 2007.

== Works ==
=== String Quartet No. 1 in D minor (1914) ===
Nancy Dalberg's debut quartet premiered privately at her home with Carl Nielsen playing one of the parts. This performance marked her first public debut as a composer, although the quartet was not published during her lifetime. Its quality is on par with her later quartets. Hearing this piece reveals her keen interest in and proficiency with polyphonic part-writing.

==== Overview ====
1. Allegro appassionato
2. Scherzo: Allegretto grazioso
3. Adagio
4. Finale: Vivace

==== Analysis ====
The sonata form in the first movement is evident, with the main theme introduced by the second violin, followed by the first violin after four bars. The melody has a touch of a fugue theme, and it will sure enough be treated in imitative counterpoint. he principal area is not long. Transition begins already after 16 bars. It is based on triplets in interplay between the middle strings. The second theme in B flat major/G minor starts after a ritardando and a short pause. Initially, the theme is accompanied by pizzicato in the other instruments. The second group is extensive, ending with a closing theme that echoes the second theme. Notice the dotted phrases in the examples, which will reappear in the coda. The development section is lengthy, primarily exploring the first theme through intricate polyphonic variations, and fades out before the recapitulation. In the recapitulation, the second theme appears in D major. The coda revolves around the quaver phrases from bars 3–4 of the second theme, previously heard in the closing theme (bar 7–8, dolce), but with extended note values. The first six notes dominate the coda.

The short Scherzo is in ternary form. It begins with the violins playing the scherzo theme as a canon, one bar apart. The viola and cello then repeat this, with the violins providing accompaniment. The inventive theme alternates between staccato and legato.

The brief Trio contrasts sharply, featuring a soothing theme introduced by the violins. Emphasis on the third beat and grace notes at the start of each measure (not shown in the example) enhance this effect. The lively, rhythmic opening section returns to close the movement.

The third movement also follows a ternary ABA form. The A theme is introduced in unison by the violins in G minor, possibly derived from a subsidiary theme of the first movement. The B section offers a stark contrast with a switch to 3/4 time, an increased tempo, and a more contrapuntal texture, making it nearly twice as long as the A section and beginning in G major. When the A section returns, the theme is played by the cello. The final movement, notable for its use of irregular time signatures such as 5/4 and 7/4, is a standout. Such meters are rare in Western art music and often used to evoke folk influences, but here Dalberg likely uses 5/4 to showcase her compositional prowess. The rapid tempo and the musicians' ability to perform this challenging rhythm naturally are impressive. The movement follows a sonata form. A syncopated theme appears next in the primary area, continuing after four bars with a new theme in the lower instruments. The meter shifts to 4/4 at the end of the primary area. As the second group begins, the tempo slows, and a slow melody in F minor is introduced, followed by another theme in F major.

The extended development section reintroduces the 5/4 meter, focusing solely on the first group's themes. A highlight is a melody reminiscent of theme 3 in the viola and cello. In the recapitulation, themes 3 and 4 are absent, with the second theme now in D major. A coda based on the principal theme concludes this remarkable movement, blending rapid rhythm with a touch of slow poetry.

=== String Quartet No. 2 in G minor, Op. 14 (1921–1922) ===
The Quartet, published in 1926, received praise from many critics, including Wilhelm Altmann. Yet, as was often the case at the time, there was surprise that a woman could achieve such a high level of composition. Dedicated to The Breuning-Bache Quartet, the piece begins with a mysterious introduction reminiscent of Mozart’s "Dissonance" Quartet, with each part entering successively. These initial dissonances are resolved into a more tonal theme, as illustrated by the two violin parts.

==== Overview ====
1. Moderato
2. Allegro scherzando
3. Andante con moto e cantabile
4. Allegro molto e con spirit

==== Analysis ====
The opening Moderato transitions into an Allegro vivace through an accelerando and crescendo, presenting a theme considered the principal one. Triplet figures reappear, though each part diverges, with the viola now playing a line from the previous dolce espressivo theme. This theme tapers off in diminuendo and rallentando, with numerous tempo shifts characterizing the movement. The subsidiary section, marked Tranquillo, introduces its theme in the first violin, accompanied by significant viola commentary.

In the development section (Allegro vivace), the triplet and quintuplet figures from the dolce espressivo theme are revisited, and the first theme is elaborated alongside various earlier motives. In the middle section, the cello plays the dolce espressivo theme at a slower tempo (poco meno). The first theme reappears, and the eighth-note figure from earlier examples concludes the development in diminuendo. The recapitulation starts with the Moderato introduction, with the primary group shortened and the second group (marked 14) condensed compared to the exposition. The dolce espressivo theme returns (mark 15), leading to an explosive reprise of the first theme's initial motive in fortissimo (mark 16), played con fuoco. The coda revolves around the eighth-note figures from the introduction, recreating the movement's initial mysticism and showcasing impressive polyphonic instrumentation.

The second movement, a scherzo in ternary form, opens with bird-like chirping from the second violin and viola, soon joined by a cantabile melody in the first violin. These three motives dominate the A section. The B section, or Trio, is a fugato, with parts entering sequentially every 2, 4, and 6 bars. A short segment with an augmented variant of the fugato theme transitions back to the A section, designated Pesante and in 4/4 time, bringing the movement to a close.

The third movement, Andante con moto e cantabile, has an unusual structure for a slow movement, featuring seven parts alternating between 3/2 and 2/2 time in an A-E1-A-E2-A-E3-A pattern. It resembles a rondo with a recurring ritornello and independent episodes, but also contains sonata form elements, as E1 changes key and E2 has a developmental character. The stately ritornello theme (A) flows forward with even quarter notes. In the extended E1 episode, a waving theme emerges after a brief introduction, followed by a key change and a new theme. The ensuing dialogue hints at future developments. E2 (rehearsal mark 45) is shorter, featuring motives from E1, such as inverted syncopated figures in the viola and eighth-note phrases in the second violin, treated imitatively starting with the first violin. A descending phrase at the end of E2 builds up to episode E3, followed by the final ritornello.

The finale, Allegro molto e con spirito, appears to follow a sonata form. The main theme, rhythmic and sharp, is introduced in the first violin, showcasing Dalberg's characteristic style. After a gradual tempo reduction, the extended second group begins, meant to be played calmly. The development focuses mainly on the first theme, and even as the second theme appears (rehearsal mark 57), it is not in the tonic, indicating ongoing development and further elaboration of the principal theme. A brief Pesante poco episode (just before 58) transitions to the recapitulation, which focuses solely on the principal theme. Omitting the second theme in a recapitulation is unusual, but Dalberg draws from Carl Nielsen’s precedent in his first quartet in G minor Op. 13, reflecting a departure from traditional tonal conventions.

Wilhelm Altmann wrote of Dalberg's String Quartet No.2 (in Walter Willson Cobbett's Cyclopedic Survey of Chamber Music):

"Nancy Dalberg published this work without giving her forename, and, had I not learned by chance that it was composed by a woman, considering also the austerity and native strength of her music, it would never have occurred to me that it was a woman speaking to us. Her mastery of the technique of composition is remarkable, and she has something definite to say."

=== String Quartet No. 3, Op. 20 (1927) ===
Like her first quartet, this piece wasn't published during Dalberg's lifetime. In 1946, she decided to fund the printing herself, but the process was delayed, and the quartet was only published in 1950, a year after her death. It was dedicated to her mentor and friend, Carl Nielsen, who died in 1931 but had the opportunity to hear it performed in 1928 and 1929.

==== Overview ====
1. Allegro Con passio
2. Allegretto semplice
3. Tempo giusto

==== Analysis ====
The first movement has an arch structure in an A-B-C-B-A pattern, which can be seen as a variant of the sonata form. Here, A and B serve as the exposition, C functions as the development, and the recapitulation presents B and A in reverse order. Dalberg, influenced by Bartók, anticipated the symmetrical designs seen in his fourth and fifth quartets, composed in 1928 and 1934, respectively. Interestingly, her work predated Bartók's use of similar arch forms by several years.

The main theme (A) is more rhythmic than melodic and dominates the movement. This theme is soon complemented by a passage of steady quarter notes, acting as a counterpoint to the rhythm of the main theme. These quarter notes hint at the lyrical theme in the second group, introduced by the first violin and later repeated in the high register of the cello. The development section (C) elaborates on both themes, showing an arch form itself, with the main theme's motives developed throughout and the second theme providing a counterpoint in the first violin and cello. In the recapitulation, themes appear in reverse order—first B, then A. The movement concludes with a coda in alla breve (2/2), rich in chromaticism, and ends on an F major chord without a clear tonal center.

The middle movement, Allegretto semplice, in D minor, has a ternary form dominated by two themes. The A theme features small interval changes similar to the main theme of the first movement, with phrases circulating between the parts. In the B section, the time signature changes to 3/4, and the tempo slows slightly. A 16-bar theme in two-part canon, first presented by the violin and cello, repeats four times, with the cello initially in a high register just an octave below the violin. The middle parts then take over, while the first violin and cello contribute sparse comments. The texture thickens with counter-melodies in the middle parts, and the canon concludes with a one-bar displacement, marked pianissimo espressivo and misterioso. A shortened reprise of the A section ends this movement on a D major chord.

The finale, Tempo giusto, also follows a ternary form. Dalberg connects the coda to the first movement, similar to Nielsen’s approach in the final movement of his String Quartet in G minor, Op. 13. The principal motives are evident in the initial bars of part A, where the opening motive appears in the cello and viola, and later gains prominence. The sixteenth notes in the first violin are seen as the main theme, with even eighth notes in the viola and cello serving as important counterpoints throughout. The second violin, initially resting, joins in at bar 12 with a counterpoint to the main theme in the viola and pizzicato in the cello. The main theme transitions into one based on the opening motives, showing similarities to the violin theme. In the B section, both time and key change, with triplet figures in the violins dominating the theme while the lower strings progress more slowly.

The A part returns, and the movement concludes with an alla breve coda, beginning with the quarter-note phrases from the first movement, now in the violin and cello using imitative techniques. The main theme's motive from the initial movement then appears in a more regular form. This cyclical structure recalls the techniques of Beethoven and later composers like Mendelssohn and many late 19th-century French composers, culminating in an A major triad.

=== Scherzo for String orchestra, Op. 6 (1914) ===
In 1915 her Scherzo for String orchestra Op. 6 (1914) was premiered, being conducted by Carl Nielsen. The Scherzo claimed great success but was never published in her lifetime.
