= Nørre Lyndelse =

- Town
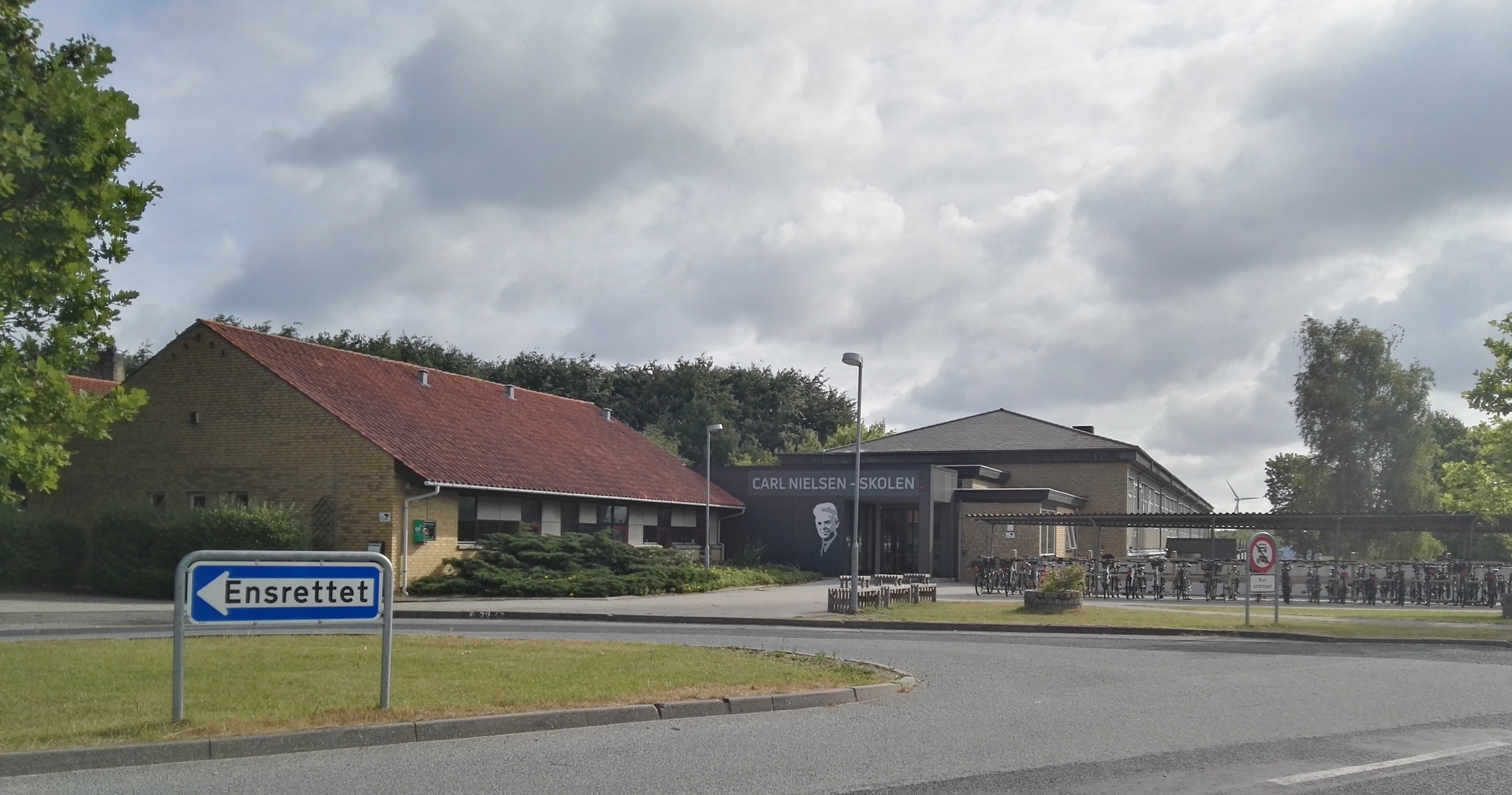
- The Carl Nielsen School in Nørre Lyndelse

- Location in Denmark Nørre Lyndelse (Region of Southern Denmark)
- Coordinates: 55°18′19″N 10°23′33″E
- Country: Denmark
- Region: Southern Denmark
- Municipality: Faaborg-Midtfyn

Area
  - Urban: 1.5 km^{2} (0.58 sq mi)

Population (2026)
  - Urban: 2,340
  - Urban density: 1,600/km^{2} (4,000/sq mi)
  - Gender: 1,157 males and 1,183 females
- Time zone: UTC+1 (CET)
  - Summer (DST): UTC+2 (CEST)
- Postal code: DK-5792 Årslev

Nørre Lyndelse is a town on the Danish island of Funen. It is located in Faaborg-Midtfyn Municipality, Region of Southern Denmark and has a population of 2,340 (1 January 2026).

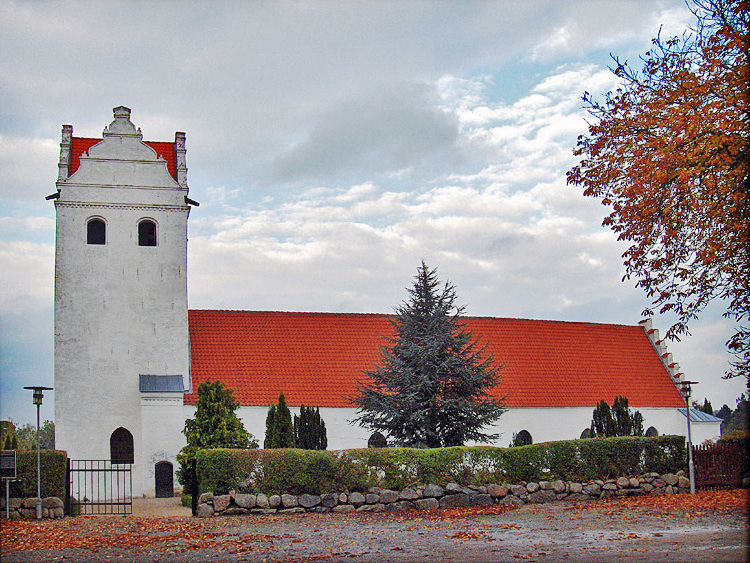
Nørre Lyndelse Church

Nørre Lyndelse Church is located in the town. It was originally built of granite at the end of the 12th century and extended 1525–53 with a new chancel to the east and a tower at the west.

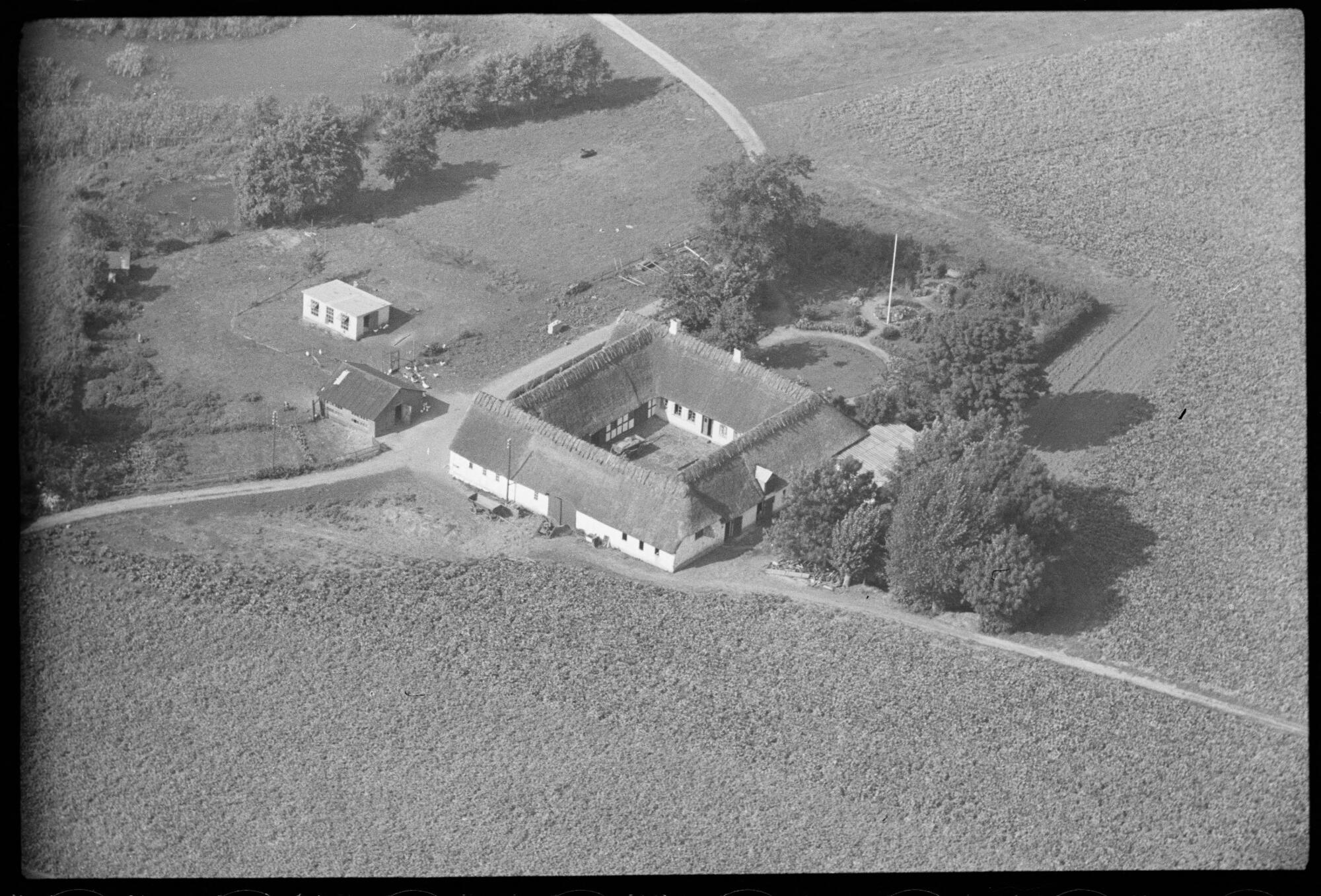
Carl Nielsen's second childhood home in Sortelung - now demolished

The danish composer Carl Nielsen was born in Sortelung near Nørre Lyndelse. His third and final childhood home, located between Nørre Lyndelse and the village of Nørre Søby, was converted into a museum in 1956.

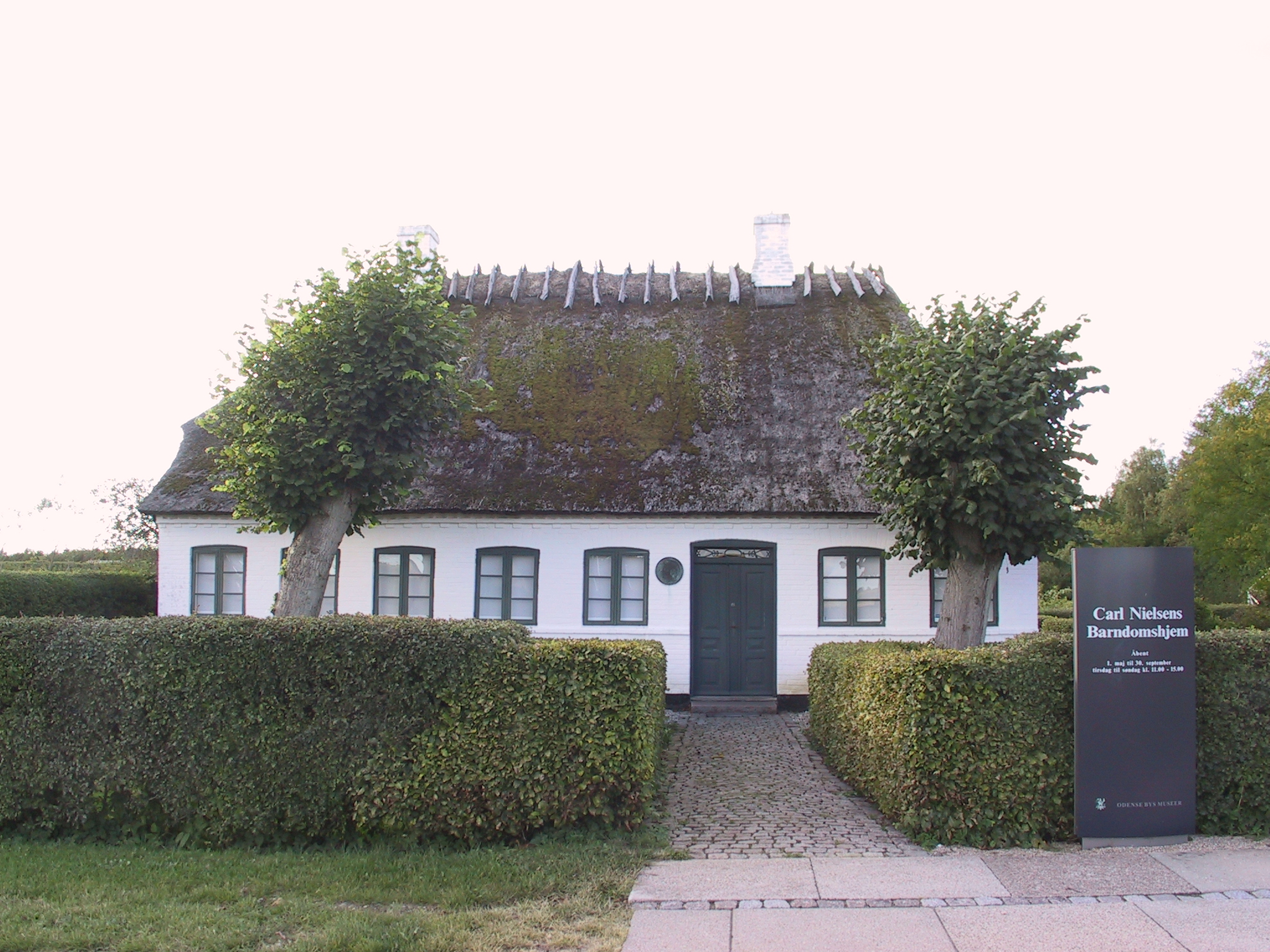
Carl Nielsen's third childhood home - now museum
