= My Childhood =

My Childhood may refer to:

- My Childhood (1972), the first in a trilogy of autobiographical films by Scottish filmmaker Bill Douglas
- Min Fynske Barndom (1927), by Carl Nielsen, translated into English as My Childhood or as My Childhood Symphony
- My Childhood (Gorky book), Detstvo (1914), by Maxim Gorky

== See also ==
- Detstvo (1852), by Leo Tolstoy, translated into English as Childhood
