= Schousboe =

Schousboe is a Danish surname. Notable people with the surname include:

- Peter Schousboe (1766–1832), Danish botanist
- Torben Schousboe (1937–2017), Danish music researcher and writer
