= Sortelung =

Settlement on the island Funen in Denmark

Coordinates: 55°18′41″N 10°24′52″E

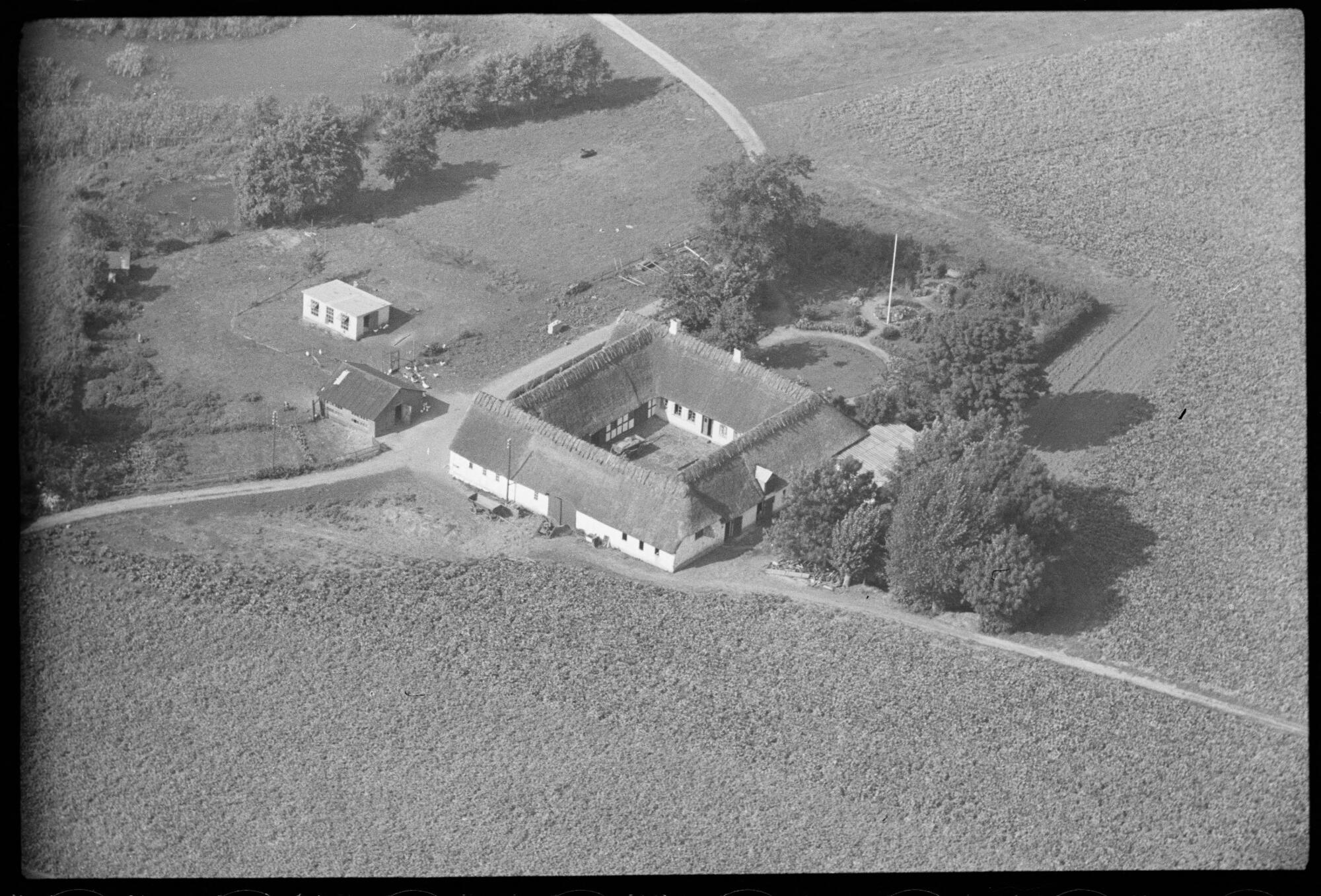
Arvensminde farmhouse in 1939, Sortelung.

Sortelung (colloquially det Sorte, meaning "the black one") is a small settlement on the Danish island of Funen. It is located near Nørre Lyndelse and south of the city of Odense.

== History ==
The settlement of Sortelung is approximately 1300 metres long and 400 metres wide. Until the 19th century maps referred to the northern portion as Sorte Long or Gammel Long ("Black-" or "Old Moor"), while the southern portion was called Sorte Sø ("Black Lake"). The nominal lake was drained around 1800, leading to the creation of a peat bog. The northern area was dug up for clay, which was burned into bricks at the local brickworks – many of the workers there were migrants from the county of Lippe-Detmold in Germany; three of these workers – Conrad Stuckenbrock, Conrad Siekmann and Wilhelm Grotegut – were tasked with leading the team of seven or eight workers there at different times between 1854 and 1868.

In 1870 there were 22 dwellings in Sortelung, 8 of which were home to two families. The population numbered 121 people, half of which were children. Of the men, half were (day) labourers, three were farmers and some more were skilled craftsmen; additionally there was one musician (Niels Jørgensen) and one millwright. The women were housewives who occasionally did work on the surrounding farms.

== Birthplace of Carl Nielsen ==
=== Uglehuset ===
In 1865 the composer Carl Nielsen was born in Sortelung as the seventh of twelve children. His birthhouse was called Uglehuset ("the Owl House") – his father Niels Jørgensen rented half of the house from W. A. Langskilde, lord of Bramstrup manor, between June 1861 and 1873; the other half was rented by a farmworker called Store Hans Jensen, who also lived there with his wife and children. The 5 metre wide house with walls made of clay and pine timber-framing as well as a thatched roof contained an entry room, a utility room, two chambers and an attached chicken coop; the surrounding garden contained cherry trees. A 1862 fire insurance assessment had deemed the house dangerous, which led to its demolition in 1873. The former location of the Uglehuset is marked with a flagpole, a commemorative stone (reading "Here laa Carl Nielsens barndomshjem") and an info-sign.

=== Arvensminde ===
As necessitated by their previous home's destruction, Nielsen's family moved to the nearby Arvensminde ("Pimpernel's memory") – a four-sided courtyard farm. It was also around this time that young Carl Nielsen went out to do paid labour for the first time: at eight or nine years old he herded geese at Bramstrup manor, in later years he worked at the Sortelung brickworks. The family rented Arvensminde until around 1878, when Niels Jørgensen purchased the house called Petersborg in Nørre Lyndelse, which presently houses the Carl Nielsen Childhood Home museum (Carl Nielsens Barndomshjem). Arvensminde burned down in 1970.

== Notable people ==
- Carl Nielsen (1865 in Sortelung – 1931) a Danish composer, conductor and violinist. He described his childhood in his autobiography Min Fynske Barndom (My Childhood on Funen), published in 1927.
