= Lars Tofte =

Lars Tofte may refer to:

- Lars Løberg Tofte, Norwegian musician in Heroes & Zeros
- Valdemar Tofte (1832–1907), Danish violinist
