= Carl Nielsen Edition =

The Carl Nielsen Edition (Danish: Carl Nielsen-udgaven) includes all of Carl Nielsen's works in a bilingual practical-scientific version on a music philological basis. The project started in 1993 under the auspices of the Royal Library in Copenhagen, where the majority of the source material is available.

The first two volumes appeared in 1997 and since then more than 50 additional volumes (including variant editions) have been published. The Edition completed its work in March 2009, and comprehensively covers all Carl Nielsen's works making them available to researchers and musicians in revised scientific edition. A thematic-bibliographic list of all works, sources and literature was finished in 2014.

In 2014 to continue the Edition's work, the Danish Centre for Music Publishing began the Carl Nielsen Works Catalogue (CNW), a digital, thematic-bibliographic complete listing of all works, sources, and literature (including different versions of the same work).
