= Debashish Chaudhuri =

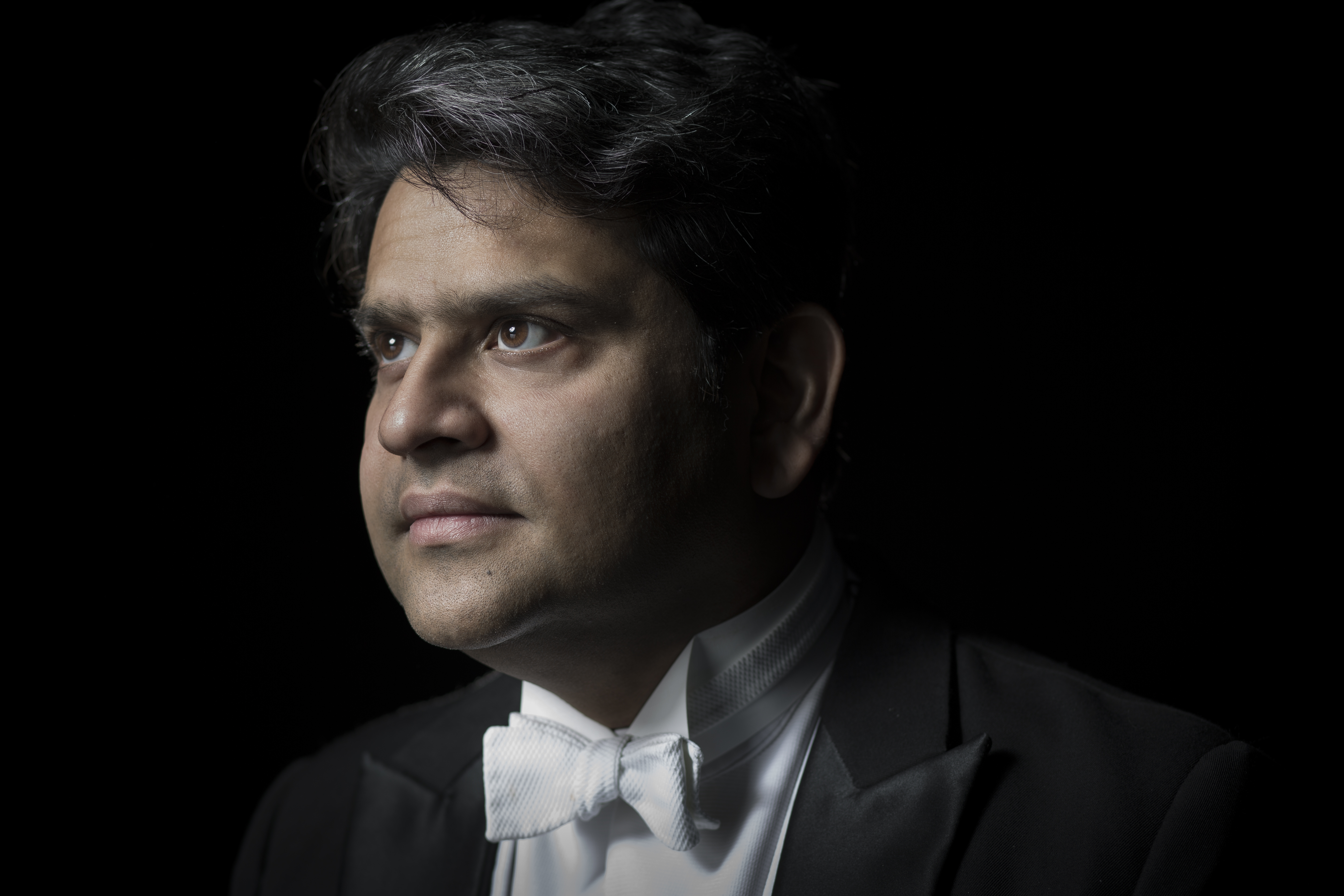
- Debashish Chaudhuri in 2018

Debashish Chaudhuri (born 14 October 1975) is an Indian symphonic conductor of Western classical music. Since 2000 he has been based in the Czech Republic. He serves on the governing body of The Antonín Dvořák Music Festival and is part of PETROF ART Family. In 2016 he led the concert tour of the Bohuslav Martinů Philharmonic as the first Czech orchestra in India after 57 years. In 2021 he was awarded the Pravasi Bharat Samman Award by the President of India for his contributions to music, the highest award for non-resident Indians. He was also awarded the prestigious Distinguished Contribution to Diplomacy Medal by the Czech Republic in 2021.

== Background ==
Chaudhuri was born into a Bengali family in Calcutta to Samir and Sadhona Chaudhuri. As a result of his father's frequent postings, Chaudhuri studied in Delhi, Mumbai and Calcutta as well as in the United States and Singapore.

== Conducting career ==
In 1995 he was appointed as music teacher at St. James' School. He conducted their four choirs. He founded the St. James' School Orchestra and the Calcutta School of Music Chamber Orchestra. In 2000 he moved to Prague, and was the first Indian to have studied at the Prague Conservatory. It is there his close contact with the family of Antonín Dvořák started. Under maestro Gianluigi Gelmetti he studied symphonic conducting at Chigiana Academy of Music in Siena, Italy. This allowed Chaudhuri to follow the footsteps of Zubin Mehta. Following the lineage, Gianluigi Gelmetti himself studied closely under Sergiu Celibidache, Franco Ferrara and Hans Swarovsky.

Chaudhuri has worked with various orchestras, including Bohuslav Martinů Philharmonic Orchestra, Brno Philharmonic, PKF-Prague Philharmonia, Pilsen Philharmonic, Moravian Philharmonic Olomouc, Janacek Philharmonic Ostrava, Prague Philharmonia, Hradec Kralove Philharmonic, Chamber Philharmonic Orchestra Pardubice, The South Czech Philharmonic, Karlovy Vary Philharmonic Orchestra, Stratus Chamber Orchestra (USA), The Imperial College Sinfonietta, Žilina State Chamber Orchestra (Slovakia), The BBC National Orchestra of Wales etc. He is invited to conduct their seasonal concerts with a repertoire ranging from Elgar, Nielsen, Roussel, Rachmaninoff, Ravel, Schubert, Dvořák, Wanhal, V. Blodek, Liszt, Rimsky-Korsakov etc. to John Mayer, Jean-Michel Jarre and Blatny.

He rediscovered the original orchestral score of Czech composer J.B Foerster's song cycle based on Rabindranath Tagore's "Gitanjali". The subsequent recording received great acclaim by the BBC in London. His CDs with the BBC showcasing rare works by John and Johnathan Mayer also received a lot of attention.

He serves on the governing body of Antonín Dvořák Music Festival, is a PETROF Family Artist and artistic advisor of The International Festival of Young Concert Artists Talentinum.

== Special projects ==
In 2006 he initiated a special annual concert for The Lions Club Bohemia, honoring visually handicapped people, which he conducted for 10 seasons. Among many others, he invited soloists like Václav Hudeček, Igor Ardašev, Jana Chaudhuri and Pavel Sporcl.

His passion for the search of symphonic music that is either inspired by India and Asia or written by Asian composers has enabled him to premiere several original works. He was invited by the Indian ambassador in 2012 to conduct a special symphonic concert for 150th anniversary of Rabindranath Tagore as well as a symphonic concert for 150th anniversary of Swami Vivekananda one year later. In 2006 and 2013 he created orchestral concerts entitled Asian Inspirations showcasing Asian inspired works. The Namaste India philharmonic project he envisaged in 2013 brought together the sitar and the tabla as solo instruments with the Pilsen Philharmonic Orchestra in addition to the Czech premiere of John Mayer's Shiva Nataraj. In June 2015 he conducted a concert at The Antonín Dvořák Music festival introducing the premiere of Mayer's Hiawatha's Song based on Dvořák's 9th Symphony. In 2016 he led the concert tour of the Bohuslav Martinu Philharmonic (65 musicians) as the first Czech orchestra in India after 57 years. The concert tour was repeated in January 2018 in New Delhi, Mumbai, Goa and Kolkata on the occasion of celebration 70 years of Indo-Czech diplomatic relations.

== Personal life ==
He is married to Czech pianist Jana Chaudhuri. His brother Rajat Chaudhuri is an artist in Denver, USA, and his parents live in Kolkata, India.
