= Suite for String Orchestra (Nielsen) =

- by Carl Nielsen
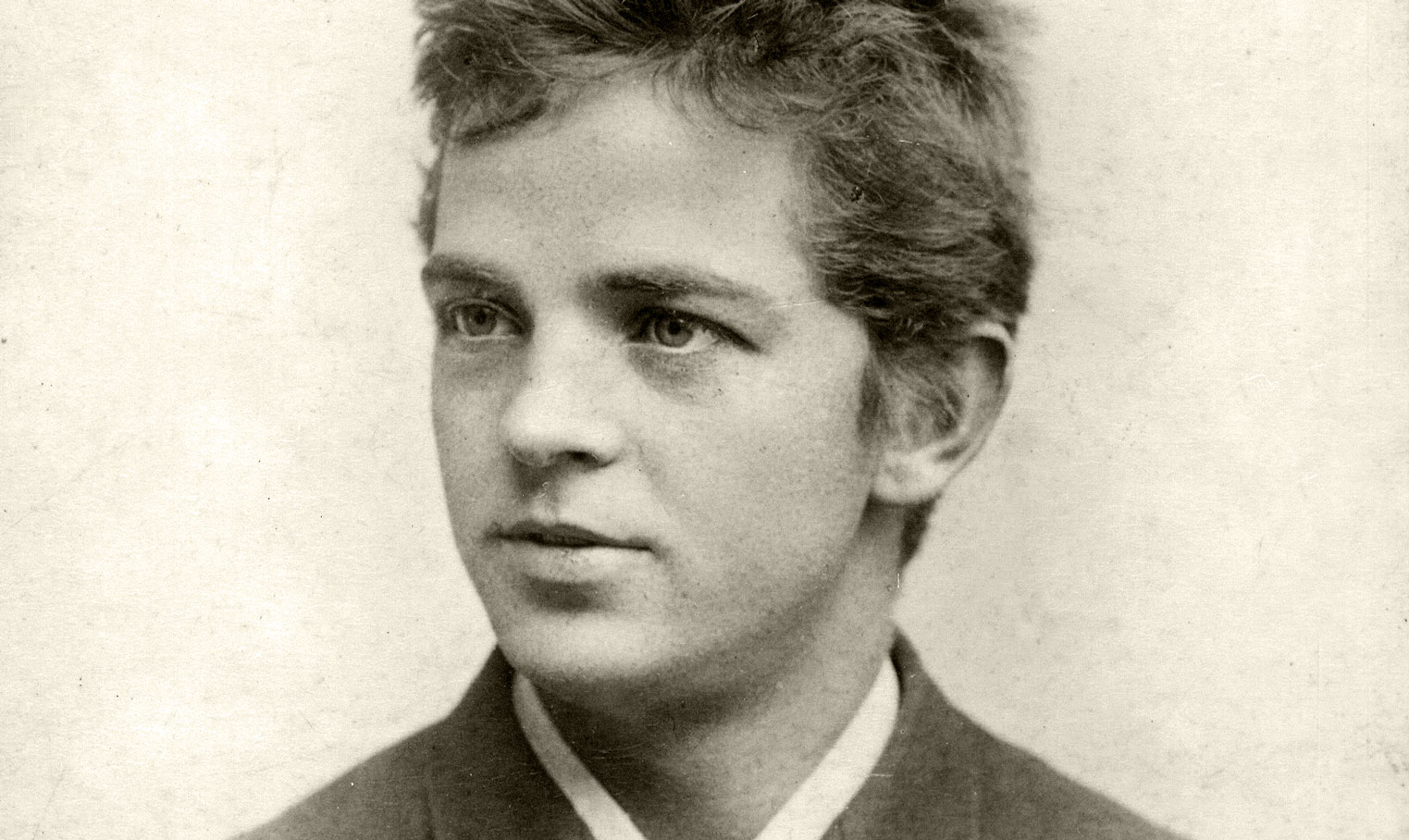
- The composer in 1884
- Catalogue: FS 6
- Opus: 1
- Scoring: String orchestra

Premiere
- Date: 9 September 1888
- Location: Tivoli Hall, Copenhagen

Carl Nielsen's Suite for String Orchestra was one of the composer's earliest works and was first performed at the Tivoli Hall on 8 September 1888.

== Background ==
Nielsen composed the Suite for String Orchestra when he was only 22 and was still studying composition with Orla Rosenhoff, his former teacher at the Conservatory. It was first performed on 8 September 1888 at the Tivoli Hall in Copenhagen where the Tivoli Orchestra was conducted by Balduin Dahl, a recognised supporter of young talent. It was a great success. Nielsen, who played in the orchestra, was called back several times and the middle movement was played as an encore. Press reviews were mixed, but Avisen was very positive: "The young man obviously has a great deal on his musical mind that he wants to say, and what he told us on Saturday was presented in a beautiful, concise form, modestly and attractively, with excellent part-writing and an appealing fullness of sound that reveals an excellent eye for the string material." The work marked an important milestone in Nielsen's career as it was not only his first real success but it was also the first of his pieces he conducted himself when it was played in Odense a month later.

In an interview with Pressens Magasin in 1918, Nielsen said that the movements had subtitles: "The Danaids", "The Dance of the Charites" and "The Bacchus Procession".

The Suite for String Orchestra was published by Wilhelm Hansen in 1890 with alterations by Nielsen, especially in the third movement.

== Music ==
The suite's rather short elegiac first movement is reminiscent of Scandinavian Romanticism as expressed by Grieg and Svendsen. The Intermezzo, a waltz, gives a hint of the composer's love of triple time, and features the occasional flat seventh grace notes that would later become so characteristic of Nielsen's music. The comparatively expansive Finale opens solemnly with the elegy theme but soon breaks loose into an animated sonata form in which Nielsen reintroduces the opening theme.

== Performances today ==
On the basis of information from the Carl Nielsen Society, the Suite for Strings is currently one of Nielsen's most widely performed works, both in Scandinavia and the rest of the world.
