= Niels Otto Raasted =

Danish composer (1888–1966)

Niels Otto Raasted (November 26, 1888, in Copenhagen – December 31, 1966) was a Danish composer and organist at Copenhagen Cathedral. He was founder and leader of the Danish Bach Association from 1925–1945 and his choral works are strongly influenced by Bach, Reger and Renaissance music.

He studied at the Copenhagen Conservatory and with Max Reger in Leipzig.

== Works, editions and recordings ==
- Sonatas for solo violin op.18 Nr.1-3 & op.30 Nr.1 & 2 Johannes Soe Hansen, Dacapo Records, 2010
- Works for organ, Ulrik Spang-Hanssen, Helikon Records, 2005
