= Carl Nielsen =

Danish composer (1865–1931)

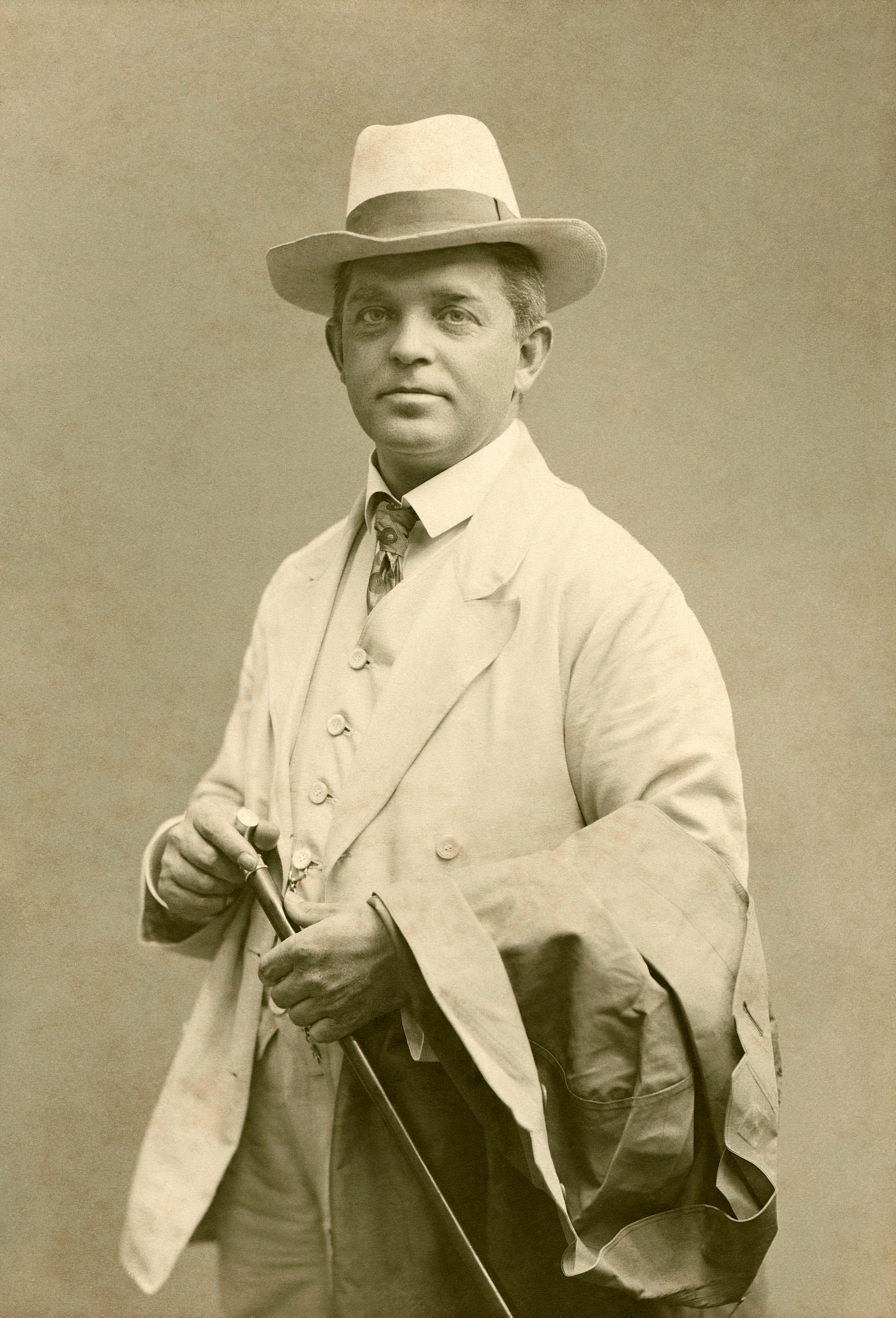
- Nielsen, c. 1908
- Born: 9 June 1865; Sortelung, Denmark
- Died: 3 October 1931 (aged 66); Copenhagen, Denmark
- Occupations: Composer, conductor, and violinist
- Works: List of compositions

Carl August Nielsen (Danish: [ˈkʰɑˀl ˈne̝lsn̩]; 9 June 1865 – 3 October 1931) was a Danish composer, conductor, and violinist, widely recognized as his country's most prominent composer.

Brought up by poor yet musically talented parents on the island of Funen, he demonstrated his musical abilities at an early age. He initially played in a military band before attending the Royal Danish Academy of Music in Copenhagen from 1884 until December 1886. He premiered his Op. 1, Suite for Strings, in 1888, at the age of 23. The following year, Nielsen began a 16-year stint as a second violinist in the Royal Danish Orchestra under the conductor Johan Svendsen, during which he played in Verdi's Falstaff and Otello at their Danish premieres. In 1916, he took a post teaching at the Royal Danish Academy and continued to work there until his death.

Although his symphonies, concertos and choral music are now internationally acclaimed, Nielsen's career and personal life were marked by many difficulties, often reflected in his music. The works he composed between 1897 and 1904 are sometimes ascribed to his "psychological" period, resulting mainly from a turbulent marriage with the sculptor Anne Marie Brodersen. Nielsen is especially noted for his six symphonies, his Wind Quintet and his concertos for violin, flute and clarinet. In Denmark, his opera Maskarade and many of his songs have become an integral part of the national heritage. His early music was inspired by composers such as Johannes Brahms and Edvard Grieg, but he soon developed his own style, first experimenting with progressive tonality and later diverging even more radically from the standards of composition still common at the time. Nielsen's sixth and final symphony, Sinfonia semplice, was written in 1924–25. He died from a heart attack six years later, and is buried in Vestre Cemetery, Copenhagen.

Nielsen maintained the reputation of a musical outsider during his lifetime, both in his own country and internationally. It was only later that his works firmly entered the international repertoire, accelerating in popularity from the 1960s through Leonard Bernstein and others. In Denmark, Nielsen's reputation was sealed in 2006 when four of his works were listed by the Danish Ministry of Culture amongst the greatest pieces of Danish classical music. For many years, he appeared on the Danish hundred-kroner banknote. The Carl Nielsen Museum in Odense documents his life and that of his wife. Between 1994 and 2009 the Royal Danish Library, sponsored by the Danish government, completed the Carl Nielsen Edition, freely available online, containing background information and sheet music for all of Nielsen's works, many of which had not been previously published.

== Life ==
=== Early years ===
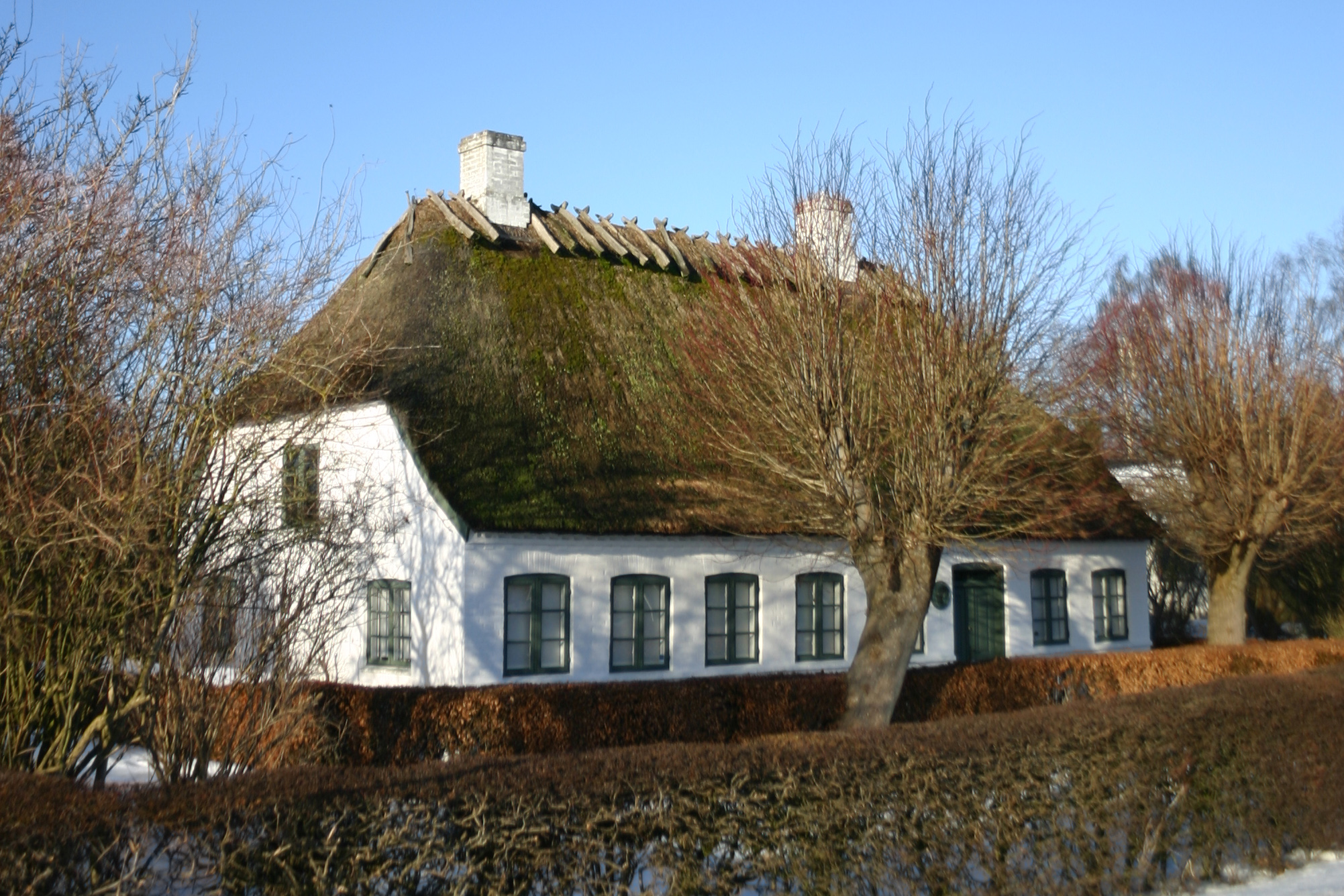
Nielsen's childhood home at Sortelung near Nørre Lyndelse

Nielsen was born on 9 June 1865, the seventh of twelve children in a poor peasant family, at Sortelung near Nørre Lyndelse, south of Odense on the island of Funen. The surname Nielsen was originally a patronymic meaning 'son of Niels'. His father, Niels Jørgensen, was a house painter and traditional musician who, with his abilities as a fiddler and cornet player, was in strong demand for local celebrations. Nielsen described his childhood in his autobiography Min Fynske Barndom (My Childhood on Funen). His mother, whom he recalls singing folk songs during his childhood, came from a well-to-do family of sea captains, while one of his half-uncles, Hans Andersen, was a talented musician.

Nielsen gave an account of his introduction to music: "I had heard music before, heard father play the violin and cornet, heard mother singing, and, when in bed with the measles, I had tried myself out on the little violin." He had received the instrument from his mother when he was six. He studied violin and piano as a child, and wrote his earliest compositions at the age of eight or nine: a lullaby, now lost, and a polka that he mentions in his autobiography. As his parents did not believe he had any future as a musician, they apprenticed him to a shopkeeper in a nearby village when he was fourteen. The shopkeeper went bankrupt by midsummer and Nielsen had to return home. After learning to play brass instruments, on 1 November 1879 he became a bugler and alto trombonist in the band of the army's 16th Battalion in Odense.

Nielsen did not give up the violin during his time with the battalion, continuing to play it when he went home to perform at dances with his father. The army paid him three kroner and 45 øre and a loaf of bread every five days for two and a half years, after which his salary was raised slightly, enabling him to buy the civilian clothes he needed to perform at barn dances.

=== Studies and early career ===
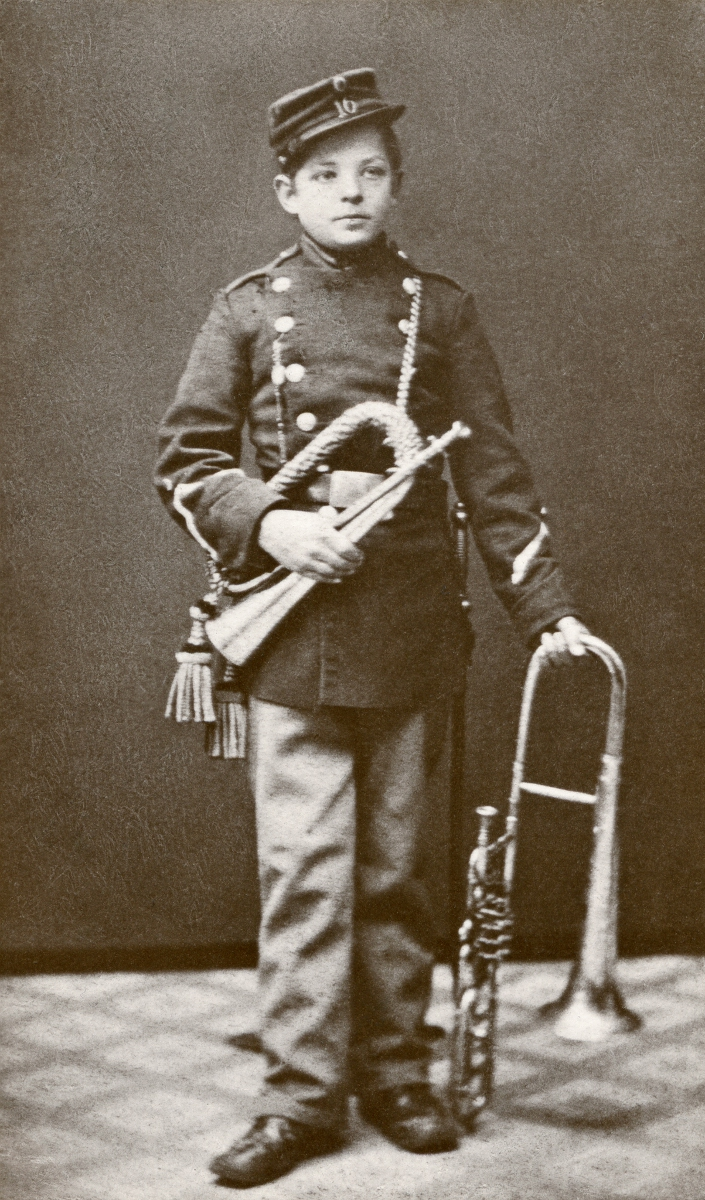
Nielsen, aged about 14, in Odense, 1879

In 1881, at the age of 16, Nielsen began to take his violin playing more seriously, studying privately under Carl Larsen, the sexton at Odense Cathedral. It is not known how much Nielsen composed during this period, but from his autobiography, it can be deduced that he wrote some trios and quartets for brass instruments, and that he had difficulty in coming to terms with the fact that brass instruments were tuned in different keys. Following an introduction to Niels W. Gade, the director of the Royal Academy in Copenhagen, by whom he was well received, Nielsen obtained his release from the military band at short notice, and studied at the Academy from the beginning of 1884.

Though not an outstanding student and composing little, Nielsen progressed well in violin under Valdemar Tofte (1832–1907), and received a solid grounding in music theory from Johan Peter Emilius Hartmann as well as from Orla Rosenhoff (1844–1905), who would remain a valued adviser during his early years as a professional composer. He also studied composition under Gade, whom he liked as a friend but not for his music. Contacts with fellow students and cultured families in Copenhagen, some of whom would become lifelong friends, became equally important. The patchy education resulting from his country background left Nielsen insatiably curious about the arts, philosophy and aesthetics. But, in the opinion of the musicologist David Fanning, it also left him "with a highly personal, common man's point of view on those subjects". He left the Academy at the end of 1886, after graduating with good but not outstanding marks in all subjects. He then went to stay with the retired Odense merchant Jens Georg Nielsen (1820–1901) and his wife at their apartment on Slagelsegade as he was not yet in a position to pay his own way. While there, he fell in love with their 14-year-old daughter Emilie Demant. The affair was to last for the next three years.

On 17 September 1887, Nielsen played the violin in the Tivoli Concert Hall when his Andante tranquillo e Scherzo for strings was premiered. Shortly afterwards, on 25 January 1888, his String Quartet in F major was played at one of the private performances of the Privat Kammermusikforening (Private Chamber Music Society). While Nielsen considered the Quartet in F to be his official debut as a professional composer, a far greater impression was made by his Suite for Strings. Performed at Tivoli Gardens, Copenhagen on 8 September 1888, it was designated by Nielsen as his Op. 1.

By September 1889 Nielsen had progressed well enough on the violin to gain a position with the second violins in the prestigious Royal Danish Orchestra which played at Copenhagen's Royal Theatre, then conducted by Johan Svendsen. In this position he experienced Verdi's Falstaff and Otello at their Danish premieres. Although this employment sometimes caused Nielsen considerable frustration, he continued to play there until 1905. After Svendsen's retirement in 1906, Nielsen increasingly served as conductor (being officially appointed assistant conductor in 1910). Between graduation and attaining this position, he made a modest income from private violin lessons while enjoying the continuing support of his patrons, not only Jens Georg Nielsen but also Albert Sachs (born 1846) and Hans Demant (1827–1897) who both ran factories in Odense. After less than a year at the Royal Theatre, Nielsen won a scholarship of 1,800 kroner, giving him the means to spend several months travelling in Europe.

=== Marriage and children ===
While travelling, Nielsen discovered and then turned against Richard Wagner's music dramas, heard many of Europe's leading orchestras and soloists and sharpened his opinions on both music and the visual arts. Although he revered the music of Bach and Mozart, he remained ambivalent about much 19th-century music. In 1891 he met the composer and pianist Ferruccio Busoni in Leipzig; they were to maintain a correspondence for over thirty years. Shortly after arriving in Paris in early March 1891 Nielsen met the Danish sculptor Anne Marie Brodersen, who was also travelling on a scholarship. They toured Italy together and married in St Mark's English Church, Florence, on 10 May 1891 before returning to Denmark. According to Fanning, their relationship was not only a "love match", but also a "meeting of minds"; Anne Marie was a gifted artist and a "strong-willed and modern-minded woman, determined to forge her own career". This determination would strain the Nielsens' marriage, as Anne Marie would spend months away from home during the 1890s and 1900s, leaving Carl, who pursued extramarital affairs with other women in her absence, to raise their three young children in addition to composing and fulfilling his duties at the Royal Theatre.

Nielsen sublimated his anger and frustration over his marriage in a number of musical works, most notably between 1897 and 1904, a period which he sometimes called his "psychological" period. Fanning writes, "At this time his interest in the driving forces behind human personality crystallized in the opera Saul and David and the Second Symphony (The Four Temperaments) and the cantatas Hymnus amoris and Søvnen". Carl suggested divorce in March 1905 and had considered moving to Germany for a fresh start, but despite several extended periods of separation the Nielsens remained married for the remainder of the composer's life.

Nielsen had five children, two of them illegitimate. He had already fathered a son, Carl August Nielsen, in January 1888, before he met Anne Marie. In 1912, an illegitimate daughter was born – Rachel Siegmann, about whom Anne Marie never learned. With his wife Nielsen had two daughters and a son. Irmelin, the elder daughter, studied music theory with her father and in December 1919 married Eggert Møller (1893–1978), a medical doctor who became a professor at the University of Copenhagen and director of the polyclinic at the National Hospital. The younger daughter Anne Marie, who graduated from the Copenhagen Academy of Arts, married the Hungarian violinist Emil Telmányi (1892–1988) in 1918; he contributed to the promotion of Nielsen's music, both as a violinist and a conductor. Nielsen's son, Hans Børge, was disabled as a result of meningitis and spent most of his life away from the family. He died near Kolding in 1956.

=== Mature composer ===
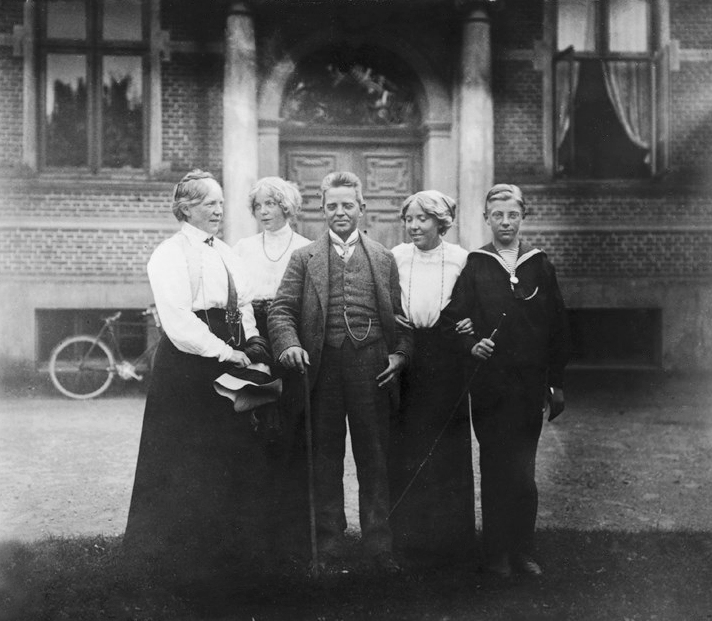
Nielsen and his family at Fuglsang Manor, c. 1915

At first, Nielsen's works did not gain sufficient recognition for him to be able to support himself. During the concert which saw the premiere of his First Symphony on 14 March 1894 conducted by Svendsen, Nielsen played in the second violin section. The symphony was a great success when played in Berlin in 1896, contributing significantly to his reputation. He was increasingly in demand to write incidental music for the theatre as well as cantatas for special occasions, both of which provided a welcome source of additional income. Fanning comments on the relationship which developed between his programmatic and symphonic works: "Sometimes he would find stageworthy ideas in his supposedly pure orchestral music; sometimes a text or scenario forced him to invent vivid musical imagery which he could later turn to more abstract use."

Nielsen's cantata Hymnus amoris for soloists, chorus and orchestra was first performed at Copenhagen's Musikforeningen (The Music Society) on 27 April 1897. It was inspired by Titian's painting Miracle of the Jealous Husband which Nielsen had seen on his honeymoon in Italy in 1891. On one of the copies, he wrote: "To my own Marie! These tones in praise of love are nothing compared to the real thing."

Beginning in 1901, Nielsen received a modest state pension – initially 800 kroner per annum, growing to 7,500 kroner by 1927 – to augment his violinist's salary. This allowed him to stop taking private pupils and left him more time to compose. From 1903, he also had an annual retainer from his principal publisher, Wilhelm Hansen Edition. Between 1905 and 1914 he served as second conductor at the Royal Theatre. For his son-in-law, Emil Telmányi, Nielsen wrote his Violin Concerto, Op. 33 (1911). From 1914 to 1926, he conducted the Musikforeningen orchestra. In 1916, he took a post teaching at the Royal Danish Academy of Music in Copenhagen, and continued to work there until his death.

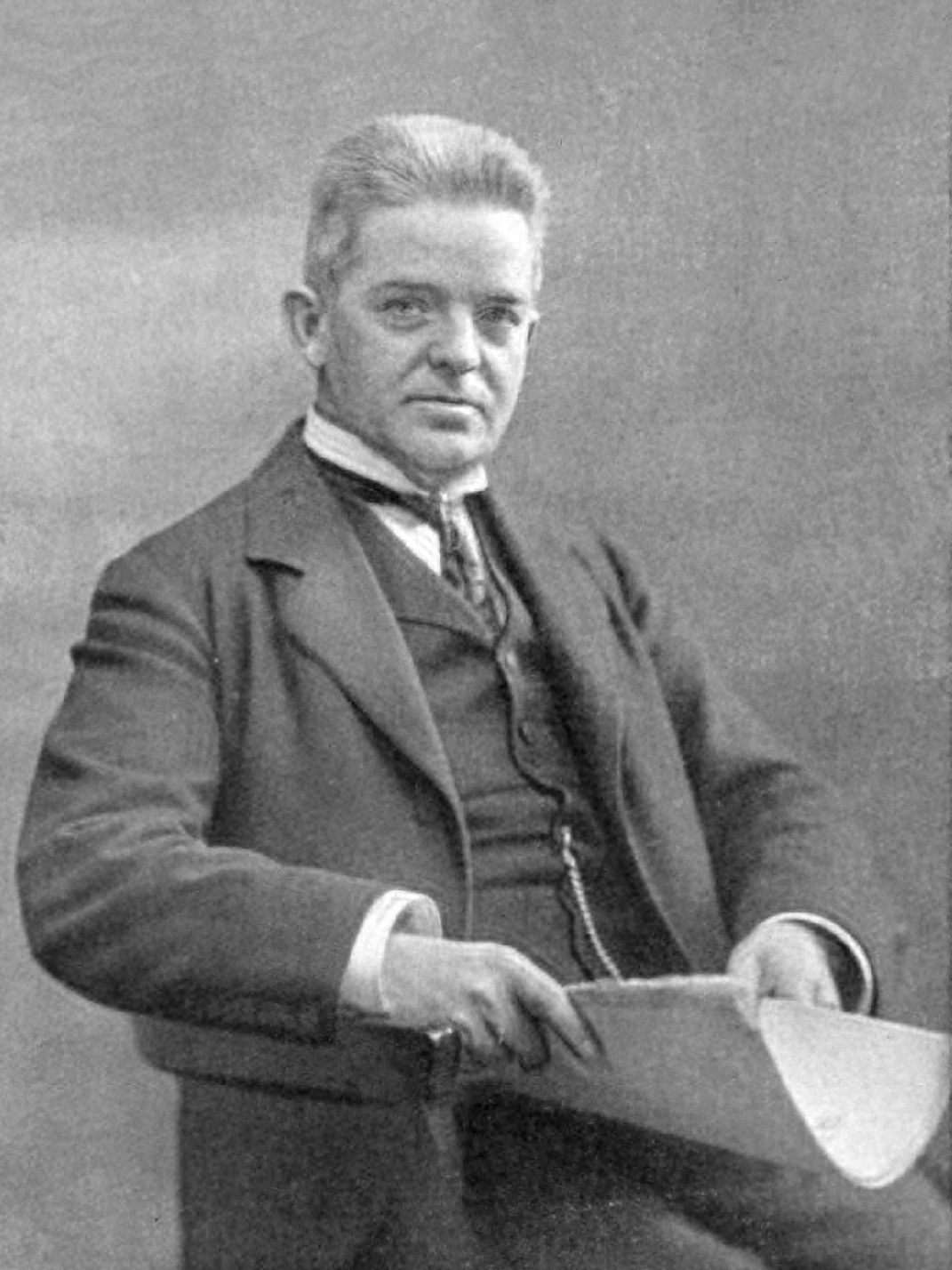
Nielsen in 1917

The strain of dual careers and constant separation from his wife led to an extended breach in his marriage. The couple began separation proceedings in 1916, and separation by mutual consent was granted in 1919. In the period 1916–22, Nielsen often lived on Funen, regularly retreating also to the Damgaard and Fuglsang estates, or worked as a conductor in Gothenburg. The period was one of creative crisis for Nielsen which, coinciding with World War I, would strongly influence his Fourth (1914–16) and Fifth symphonies (1921–22), arguably his greatest works according to Fanning. The composer was particularly upset in the 1920s when his long-standing Danish publisher Wilhelm Hansen was unable to undertake publication of many of his major works, including Aladdin and Pan and Syrinx.

The sixth and final symphony, Sinfonia semplice, was written in 1924–25. After suffering a serious heart attack in 1925, Nielsen was forced to curtail much of his activity, although he continued to compose until his death. His sixtieth birthday in 1925 brought many congratulations, a decoration from the Swedish government, and a gala concert and reception in Copenhagen. The composer, however, was in a dour mood; in an article in Politiken on 9 November 1925 he wrote:

If I could live my life again, I would chase any thoughts of Art out of my head and be apprenticed to a merchant or pursue some other useful trade the results of which could be visible in the end ... What use is it to me that the whole world acknowledges me, but hurries away and leaves me alone with my wares until everything breaks down and I discover to my disgrace that I have lived as a foolish dreamer and believed that the more I worked and exerted myself in my art, the better position I would achieve. No, it is no enviable fate to be an artist.

=== Final years and death ===
Nielsen's final large-scale orchestral works were his Flute Concerto (Nielsen) (1926) and the Clarinet Concerto (1928), of which Robert Layton writes: "If ever there was music from another planet, this is surely it. Its sonorities are sparse and monochrome, its air rarefied and bracing." Nielsen's last musical composition was the organ work Commotio.

During his final years, Nielsen produced a short book of essays entitled Living Music (1925), followed in 1927 by his memoir Min Fynske Barndom. In 1926 he wrote in his diary "My home soil pulls me more and more like a long sucking kiss. Does it mean that I shall finally return and rest in the earth of Funen? Then it must be in the place where I was born: Sortelung, Frydenlands parish".

However, this was not to be. Nielsen was admitted to Copenhagen's National Hospital (Rigshospitalet) on 1 October 1931 following a series of heart attacks. He died there at ten minutes past midnight on 3 October, surrounded by his family. His last words to them were "You are standing here as if you were waiting for something".

He was buried in Copenhagen's Vestre Cemetery; all the music at his funeral, including the hymns, was the work of the composer. After his death, his wife was commissioned to sculpt a monument to him, to be erected in central Copenhagen. She wrote: "I wanted to take the winged horse, eternal symbol of poetry, and place a musician on its back. He was to sit there between the rushing wings blowing a reed pipe out over Copenhagen." Dispute about her design and a shortfall in funding meant that erection of the monument was delayed and that Anne Marie herself ended up subsidising it. The Carl Nielsen Monument was finally unveiled in 1939.

== Music ==
Nielsen's works are sometimes referred to by CNW numbers, based on the Catalogue of Carl Nielsen's Works (CNW) published online by the Danish Royal Library in 2015. The CNW catalogue is intended to replace the 1965 catalogue compiled by Dan Fog and Torben Schousboe (FS numbers).

=== Musical style ===
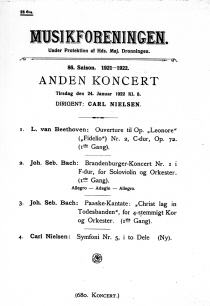
Poster for premiere of Carl Nielsen's Fifth Symphony, 1922

In his Lives of the Great Composers, the music critic Harold C. Schonberg emphasizes the breadth of Nielsen's compositions, his energetic rhythms, generous orchestration and his individuality. In comparing him with Jean Sibelius, he considers he had "just as much sweep, even more power, and a more universal message". The Oxford University music professor Daniel M. Grimley qualifies Nielsen as "one of the most playful, life-affirming, and awkward voices in twentieth-century music" thanks to the "melodic richness and harmonic vitality" of his work. Anne-Marie Reynolds, author of Carl Nielsen's Voice: His Songs in Context, cites Robert Simpson's view that "all of his music is vocal in origin", maintaining that song-writing strongly influenced Nielsen's development as a composer.

The Danish sociologist Benedikte Brincker observes that the perception of Nielsen and his music in his home country is rather different from his international appreciation. His interest and background in folk music had special resonance for Danes, and this was intensified during the nationalistic movements of the 1930s and during World War II, when singing was an important basis for the Danes to distinguish themselves from their German enemies. Nielsen's songs retain an important place in Danish culture and education. The musicologist Niels Krabbe describes the popular image of Nielsen in Denmark as being like "the ugly duckling syndrome" – a reference to the tale of the Danish writer Hans Christian Andersen – whereby "a poor boy ... passing through adversity and frugality ... marches into Copenhagen and ... comes to conquer the position as the uncrowned King".

While outside Denmark Nielsen is largely thought of as a composer of orchestral music and the opera Maskarade, in his own country he is more of a national symbol. These two sides were officially brought together in Denmark in 2006 when the Ministry of Culture issued a list of the twelve greatest Danish musical works, which included Nielsen's opera Maskarade, his Fourth Symphony, and a pair of his Danish folk songs. Krabbe asks the rhetorical question: "Can 'the national' in Nielsen be demonstrated in the music in the form of particular themes, harmonies, sounds, forms, etc., or is it a pure construct of reception history?"

Nielsen himself was ambiguous about his attitudes to late Romantic German music and to nationalism in music. He wrote to the Dutch composer Julius Röntgen in 1909 "I am surprised by the technical skills of the Germans nowadays, and I cannot help thinking that all this delight in complication must exhaust itself. I foresee a completely new art of pure archaic virtue. What do you think about songs sung in unison? We must go back ... to the pure and the clear." On the other hand, he wrote in 1925 "Nothing destroys music more than nationalism does ... and it is impossible to deliver national music on request."

Nielsen studied Renaissance polyphony closely, which accounts for some of the melodic and harmonic content of his music. This interest is exemplified in his Tre Motetter (Three Motets, Op. 55). To non-Danish critics, Nielsen's music initially had a neo-classical sound but became increasingly modern as he developed his own approach to what the writer and composer Robert Simpson called progressive tonality, moving from one key to another. Typically, Nielsen's music might end in a different key from that of its commencement, sometimes as the outcome of a struggle as in his symphonies. There is debate as to how much such elements owe to his folk music activities. Some critics have referred to his rhythms, his use of acciaccaturas or appoggiaturas, or his frequent use of a flattened seventh and minor third in his works, as being typically Danish. The composer himself wrote "The intervals, as I see it, are the elements which first arouse a deeper interest in music ... [I]t is intervals which surprise and delight us anew every time we hear the cuckoo in spring. Its appeal would be less if its call were all on one note."

Nielsen's philosophy of music style is perhaps summed up in his advice in a 1907 letter to the Norwegian composer Knut Harder: "You have ... fluency, so far, so good; but I advise you again and again, my dear Mr. Harder; Tonality, Clarity, Strength."

=== Symphonies ===
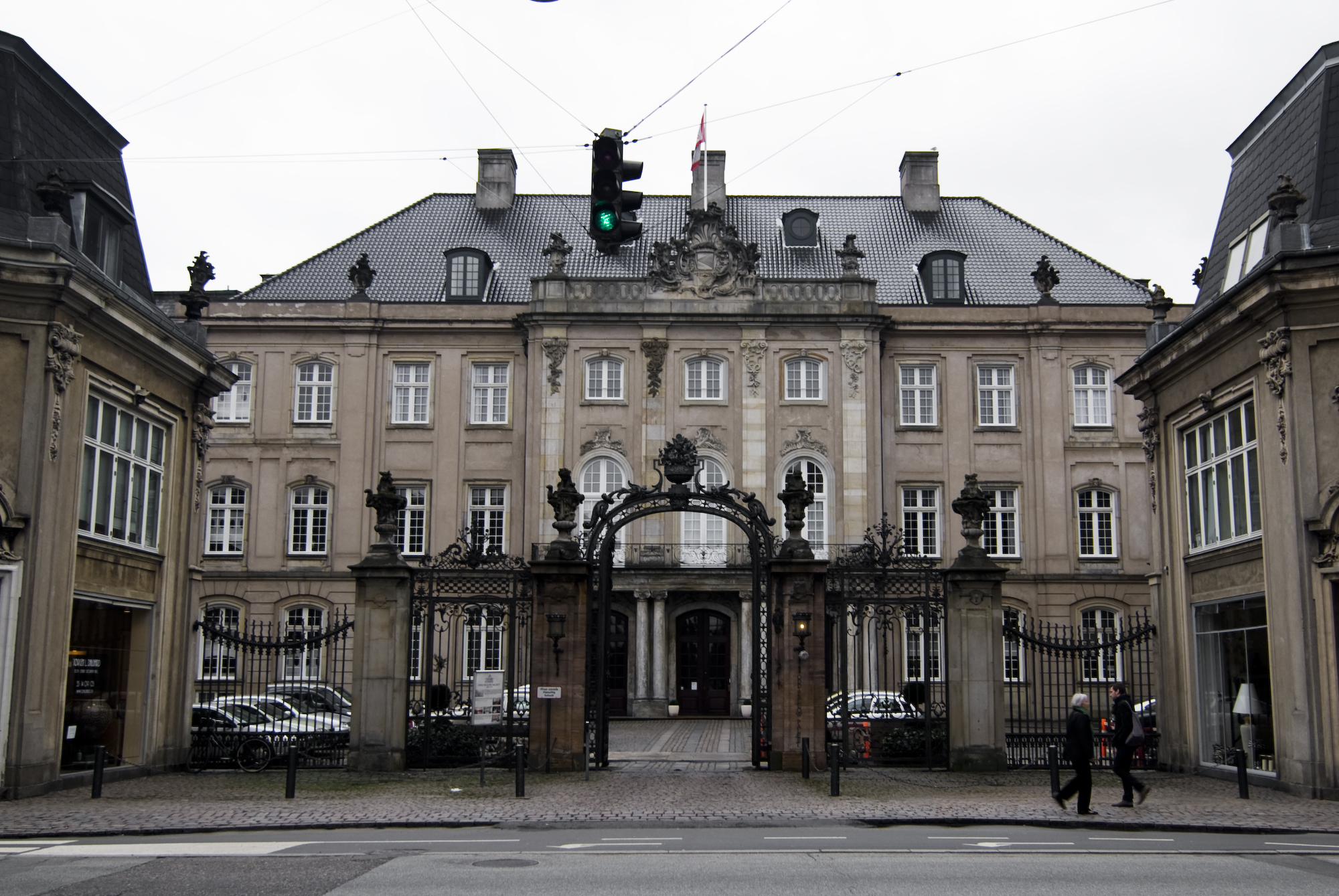
Odd Fellows Mansion in Copenhagen where many of Nielsen's compositions were premiered

Nielsen is perhaps most closely associated outside Denmark with his six symphonies, written between 1892 and 1925. The works have much in common: they are all just over 30 minutes long, brass instruments are a key component of the orchestration, and they all exhibit unusual changes in tonality, which heighten the dramatic tension. From its opening bars, Symphony No. 1 (Op. 7, 1890–92), while reflecting the influence of Grieg and Brahms, shows Nielsen's individuality. In Symphony No. 2 (Op. 16, 1901–02), Nielsen embarks on the development of human character. Inspiration came from a painting in an inn depicting the four temperaments (choleric, phlegmatic, melancholic, and sanguine).

The title of Symphony No. 3, Sinfonia Espansiva (Op. 27, 1910–11), is understood by the English composer Robert Simpson to refer to the "outward growth of the mind's scope". It fully exploits Nielsen's technique of confronting two keys at the same time and includes a peaceful section with soprano and baritone voices, singing a tune without words. Symphony No. 4, The Inextinguishable (Op. 29, 1914–16), written during World War I, is among the most frequently performed of the symphonies. In the last movement two sets of timpani are placed on opposite sides of the stage undertaking a kind of musical duel. Nielsen described the symphony as "the life force, the unquenchable will to live". It premiered in February 1916 in Copenhagen, two weeks after its completion, and was performed in Warsaw, London, Paris, and St Louis the following year.

Also frequently performed is the Symphony No. 5 (Op. 50, 1921–22), presenting another battle between the forces of order and chaos. A snare drummer is given the task of interrupting the orchestra, playing ad libitum and out of time, as if to destroy the music. Performed by the Danish Radio Symphony Orchestra conducted by Erik Tuxen at the 1950 Edinburgh International Festival, it caused a sensation, sparking interest in Nielsen's music outside Scandinavia. In Symphony No. 6 (without opus number), written 1924–25, and subtitled Sinfonia Semplice (Simple Symphony), the tonal language seems similar to that in Nielsen's other symphonies, but the symphony develops into a sequence of cameos, some sad, some grotesque, some humorous.

=== Operas and cantatas ===
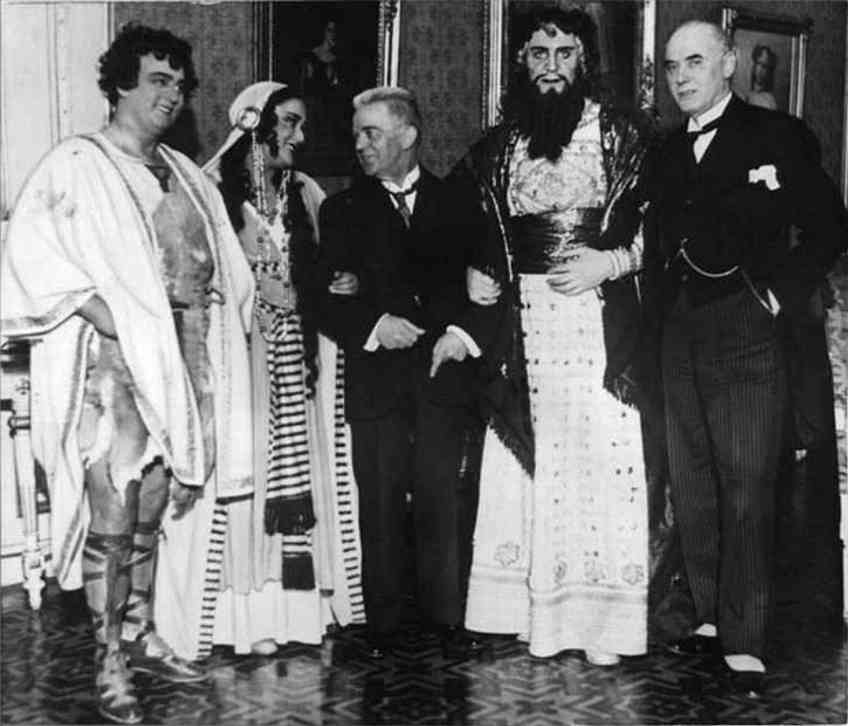
Nielsen with the cast of Saul og David, Stockholm, 1931

Nielsen's two operas are very different in style. The four-act Saul og David (Saul and David), written in 1902 to a libretto by Einar Christiansen, tells the Biblical story of Saul's jealousy of the young David while Maskarade (Masquerade) is a comic opera in three acts written in 1906 to a Danish libretto by Vilhelm Andersen, based on the comedy by Ludvig Holberg. Saul and David received a negative press when it was premiered in November 1902 and did no better when it was revived in 1904. By contrast, in November 1906 Masquerade was a resounding success with an exceptional run of 25 performances over its first four months. Generally considered to be Denmark's national opera, in its home country it has enjoyed lasting success and popularity, attributable to its many strophic songs, its dances and its underlying "old Copenhagen" atmosphere.

Nielsen wrote a considerable number of choral works but most of them were composed for special occasions and were seldom reprised. Three fully-fledged cantatas for soloists, orchestra and choir have, however, entered the repertoire. Nielsen composed Hymnus amoris (Hymn of Love), Op. 12 (1897) after studying early polyphonic choral style. Writing in the newspaper Dannebrog, Nanna Liebmann referred to the work as "a decisive victory" for Nielsen, and Angul Hammerich of Nationaltidende welcomed its improved clarity and purity. But the Berlingske Tidende reviewer H.W. Schytte thought Nielsen had been pretentious presenting the lyrics in Latin rather than Danish. Søvnen (The Sleep), Op. 18, Nielsen's second major choral work, sets to music the various phases of sleep including the terror of a nightmare in its central movement which, with its unusual discords, came as a shock to the reviewers at its premiere in March 1905. Fynsk Foraar (Springtime on Funen), Op. 42, completed in 1922, has been cited as the most Danish of all Nielsen's compositions as it extols the beauty of Funen's countryside.

=== Concertos ===
Nielsen wrote three concertos: the Violin Concerto, Op. 33 is a middle-period work, from 1911, which lies within the tradition of European classicism, whereas the Flute Concerto (without opus number) of 1926 and the Clarinet Concerto, Op. 57 which followed in 1928 are late works, influenced by the modernism of the 1920s and, according to the Danish musicologist Herbert Rosenberg, the product of "an extremely experienced composer who knows how to avoid inessentials." Unlike Nielsen's later works, the Violin Concerto has a distinct, melody-oriented neo-classical structure. The Flute Concerto, in two movements, was written for the flautist Holger Gilbert-Jespersen, a member of the Copenhagen Wind Quintet which had premiered Nielsen's Wind Quintet (1922). In contrast to the rather traditional style of the Violin Concerto, it reflects the modernistic trends of the period. The first movement, for example, switches between D minor, E-flat minor and F major before the flute comes to the fore with a cantabile theme in E major. The Clarinet Concerto was also written for a member of the Copenhagen Wind Quintet, Aage Oxenvad. Nielsen stretches the capacities of instrument and player to the utmost; the concerto has just one continuous movement and contains a struggle between the soloist and the orchestra and between the two principal competing keys, F major and E major.

The wind concertos present many examples of what Nielsen called objektivering ("objectification"). By this term he meant giving instrumentalists freedom of interpretation and performance within the bounds set out by the score.

=== Orchestral music ===
Nielsen's earliest work composed specifically for orchestra was the immediately successful Suite for Strings, Op. 1 (1888), which evoked Scandinavian Romanticism as expressed by Grieg and Svendsen. The work marked an important milestone in Nielsen's career as it was not only his first real success but it was also the first of his pieces he conducted himself when it was played in Odense a month later.

The Helios Overture, Op. 17 (1903) stems from Nielsen's stay in Athens which inspired him to compose a work depicting the sun rising and setting over the Aegean Sea. The score is a showpiece for orchestra, and has been amongst Nielsen's most popular works. Saga-Drøm (Saga Dream), Op. 39 (1907–08) is a tone poem for orchestra based on the Icelandic Njal's Saga. In Nielsen's words:

There are among other things four cadenzas for oboe, clarinet, bassoon and flute which run quite freely alongside one another, with no harmonic connection, and without my marking time. They are just like four streams of thought, each going its own way – differently and randomly for each performance – until they meet in a point of rest, as if flowing into a lock where they are united.

At the Bier of a Young Artist (Ved en ung Kunstners Baare) for string orchestra was written for the funeral of the Danish painter Oluf Hartmann in January 1910 and was also played at Nielsen's own funeral. Pan and Syrinx (Pan og Syrinx), a vigorous nine-minute symphonic poem inspired by Ovid's Metamorphoses, was premiered in 1911. The Rhapsodic Overture, An Imaginary Trip to the Faroe Islands (En Fantasirejse til Færøerne), draws on Faroese folk tunes but also contains freely composed sections.

Among Nielsen's orchestral works for the stage are Aladdin (1919) and Moderen (The Mother), Op. 41 (1920). Aladdin was written to accompany a production of Adam Oehlenschläger's fairy tale at The Royal Theatre in Copenhagen. The complete score, lasting over 80 minutes, is Nielsen's longest work apart from his operas, but a shorter orchestral suite consisting of the Oriental March, Hindu Dance and Negro Dance is often performed. Moderen, written to celebrate the reunification of Southern Jutland with Denmark, was first performed in 1921; it is a setting of patriotic verses written for the occasion.

=== Chamber music ===
Nielsen composed several chamber music works, some of them still high on the international repertoire. The Wind Quintet, one of his most popular pieces, was composed in 1922 specifically for the Copenhagen Wind Quintet. Simpson, explaining that Nielsen's fondness of wind instruments was closely related to his love of nature, writes: "He was also intensely interested in human character, and in the Wind Quintet composed deliberately for five friends; each part is cunningly made to suit the individuality of each player."

Wind Quintet, Op. 43
I. Allegro ben moderato

II. Menuetto

III. Praeludium: Adagio. Tema con variazioni: Un poco andantino
Performed by James Galway (flute) with the Carion quintet

Nielsen wrote four string quartets. The First String Quartet No. 1 in G minor, Op. 13 (1889, revised 1900) contains a "Résumé" section in the finale, bringing together themes from the first, third and fourth movements. The Second String Quartet No. 2 in F minor, Op. 5 appeared in 1890 and the Third String Quartet in E-flat major, Op. 14 in 1898. The music historian Jan Smaczny suggests that in this work "the handling of texture is confident and far less derivative than in earlier works ... [the quartet] prompts the most regret that Nielsen did not pursue the genre further ... to parallel his later symphonic development". The Fourth String Quartet in F major (1904) initially received a mixed reception, with critics uncertain about its reserved style. Nielsen revised it several times, the final version in 1919 being listed as his Op. 44.

The violin was Nielsen's own instrument and he composed four large-scale chamber works for it. The departures from standard procedures in the First Sonata, Op. 9 (1895), including its often sudden modulations and its terse thematic material, disconcerted Danish critics at its first performance. The Second Sonata, Op. 35 of 1912 was written for the violinist Peder Møller who earlier that year had premiered the composer's Violin Concerto. The work is an example of the composer's progressive tonality since, although it is stated to be in the key of G minor, the first and final movements end in different keys. The critic Emilius Bangert wrote of the premiere (which was given by Axel Gade), "The overall impression was of a beautiful, unbroken line – a flow of notes – where in particular a wonderful second subject in the first part and the pure, high sphere of the last part were captivating". Two other works are for violin solo. The Prelude, Theme and Variations, Op. 48 (1923) was written for Telmányi, and, like Nielsen's Chaconne for piano, Op. 32, was inspired by the music of Johann Sebastian Bach. The Preludio e Presto, Op. 52 (1928) was written as a tribute for the sixtieth birthday of the composer Fini Henriques.

=== Keyboard works ===
Although Nielsen came to compose mainly at the piano, he only composed directly for it occasionally over a period of 40 years, creating works often with a distinctive style which slowed their international acceptance. Nielsen's own piano technique, an echo of which is probably preserved in three wax cylinders marked "Carl Nielsen" at the State Archives in Aarhus, seems to have been mediocre. Reviewing the 1969 recording of works by the pianist John Ogdon, John Horton commented on the early pieces: "Nielsen's technical resources hardly measure up to the grandeur of his designs", whilst characterising the later pieces as "major works which can stand comparison with his symphonic music". The anti-romantic tone of the Symphonic Suite, Op. 8 (1894) was described by a later critic as "nothing less than a clenched fist straight in the face of all established musical convention". In Nielsen's words, the Chaconne, Op. 32 (1917) was "a really big piece, and I think effective". It is not only inspired by the work of Bach, especially the chaconne for solo violin, but also by the virtuoso piano arrangements of Bach's music by composers such as Robert Schumann, Johannes Brahms and Ferruccio Busoni. Also on a large scale, and from the same year, is the Theme and Variations, Op. 40, in which critics have discerned the influences of Brahms and also of Max Reger, of whom Nielsen had earlier written to a friend "I think that the public will be utterly unable to grasp Reger's work and yet I am a lot more sympathetic towards his efforts than towards ... Richard Strauss".

All Nielsen's organ works were late compositions. The Danish organist Finn Viderø suggests that his interest was prompted by the Orgelbewegung (Organ reform movement), and the renewal of the front pipes of the Schnitger organ in the St. Jacobi Church, Hamburg, from 1928 to 1930. Nielsen's last major work – Commotio, Op. 58, a 22-minute piece for organ – was composed between June 1930 and February 1931, only a few months before his death.

=== Songs and hymns ===
Forunderligt at sige ("How wonderful to ponder")
Christmas hymn played on piano, lyrics by N. F. S. Grundtvig omitted (0:44)

Grøn er Vaarens Hæk ("Green in the Hedge in Spring")
Played on piano, lyrics by Poul Martin Møller omitted (0:25)

Se dig ud en Sommerdag ("Look about one summer day")
Played on piano, lyrics by Jeppe Aakjær omitted (0:27)

Over the years, Nielsen wrote the music for over 290 songs and hymns, most of them for verses and poems by well-known Danish authors such as N. F. S. Grundtvig, Ingemann, Poul Martin Møller, Adam Oehlenschläger and Jeppe Aakjær. In Denmark, many of them are still popular today both with adults and children. They are regarded as "the most representative part of the country's most representative composer's output". In 1906, Nielsen had explained the significance of such songs to his countrymen:

With certain melodic inflections we Danes unavoidably think of the poems of, for example, Ingemann, Christian Winther or Drachmann, and we often seem to perceive the smell of Danish landscapes and rural images in our songs and music. But it is also clear that a foreigner, who knows neither our countryside, nor our painters, our poets, or our history in the same intimate way as we do ourselves, will be completely unable to grasp what it is that brings us to hear and tremble with sympathetic understanding.

Of great significance was Nielsen's contribution to the 1922 publication, Folkehøjskolens Melodibog (The Folk High School Songbook), of which he was one of the editors together with Thomas Laub, Oluf Ring and Thorvald Aagaard. The book contained about 600 melodies, of which about 200 were composed by the editors, and was intended to provide a repertoire for communal singing, an integral part of Danish folk culture. The collection was extremely popular and became embedded in the Danish educational system. During the German occupation of Denmark in World War II, mass song gatherings, using these melodies, were part of Denmark's "spiritual re-armament", and after the war in 1945 Nielsen's contributions were characterised by one writer as "shining jewels in our treasure-chest of patriotic songs". This remains a significant factor in Danish assessment of the composer.

=== Editions ===
Between 1994 and 2009 a complete new edition of Nielsen's works, the Carl Nielsen Edition, was commissioned by the Danish Government (at a cost of over 40 million kroner). For many of the works, including the operas Maskarade and Saul and David, and the complete Aladdin music, this was their first printed publication, copies of manuscripts having previously been used in performances. The scores are now all available for download free of charge at the website of the Danish Royal Library (which also owns most of Nielsen's music manuscripts).

== Reception ==
Unlike that of his contemporary, the Finn Jean Sibelius, Nielsen's reputation abroad did not start to evolve until after World War II. For some time, international interest was largely directed towards his symphonies while his other works, many of them highly popular in Denmark, have only recently started to become part of the world repertoire. Even in Denmark, many of his compositions failed to impress. It was only in 1897 after the first performance of Hymnus amoris that he received support from the critics, to be substantially reinforced in 1906 by their enthusiastic reception of Masquerade.

Within two months of its successful premiere at the Odd Fellows Concert Hall in Copenhagen on 28 February 1912, the Third Symphony (Espansiva) was in the repertoire of the Amsterdam Concertgebouw, and by 1913 it had seen performances in Stuttgart, Stockholm and Helsinki. The symphony was the most popular of all Nielsen's works during his lifetime and was also played in Berlin, Hamburg, London and Gothenburg. Other works caused some uncertainty, even in Denmark. After the premiere of the Fifth Symphony (1922) one critic wrote: "The treasure of Danish symphonies and Carl Nielsen's own output have been enriched by a strange and highly original work." Another, however, described it as a "bloody, clenched fist in the face of an unsuspecting snob audience", also qualifying it as "filthy music from trenches".

At the end of the 1940s two major biographies of Nielsen appeared in Danish, dominating opinion of the composer's life and work for several decades. Robert Simpson's book Carl Nielsen, Symphonist (first edition 1952) was the earliest large-scale study in English.

An international breakthrough came in 1962 when Leonard Bernstein recorded the Fifth Symphony with the New York Philharmonic for CBS. The recording helped Nielsen's music to achieve appreciation beyond his home country and is considered one of the finest recorded accounts of the symphony. Nielsen's centenary in 1965 was widely celebrated, both in terms of performances and publications, and Bernstein was awarded the Sonning Prize for his recording of the Third Symphony. In 1988 Nielsen's diaries and his letters to Anne Marie were published, and these, together with a 1991 biography by Jørgen Jensen using this new material, led to a revised objective assessment of the composer's personality. Writing in The New York Times on the occasion of Nielsen's 125th anniversary in 1990, the music critic Andrew Pincus recalled that 25 years earlier Bernstein had believed the world was ready to accept the Dane as the equal of Jean Sibelius, speaking of "his rough charm, his swing, his drive, his rhythmic surprises, his strange power of harmonic and tonal relationships – and especially his constant unpredictability" (which Pincus believed was still a challenge for audiences). Biographies and studies in English in the 1990s helped to establish Nielsen's status worldwide, to the point at which his music has become a regular feature of concert programming in Western countries.

Writing in The New Yorker in 2008, the American music critic Alex Ross compares the "brute strength" of Nielsen's symphonies to Beethoven's Eroica and Fifth Symphony but explains that only now were the Americans slowly beginning to appreciate the Danish composer.

Nielsen did not record any of his works. However, three younger contemporary conductors who had worked with him, Thomas Jensen, Launy Grøndahl, and Erik Tuxen, did record his symphonies and other orchestral works with the Danish Radio Symphony Orchestra between 1946 and 1952. Jensen also made the first LP recording of the Fifth Symphony in 1954. Work carried out by the recently published complete Carl Nielsen Edition has revealed that the scores used in these recordings often differ from the composer's original intentions and thus the supposed authenticity of these recordings is now debatable.

There are now numerous recordings of all Nielsen's major works, including complete cycles of the symphonies conducted by, amongst others, Sir Colin Davis, Herbert Blomstedt and Sakari Oramo. Over 50 recordings have been made of Nielsen's Wind Quintet.

== Legacy ==
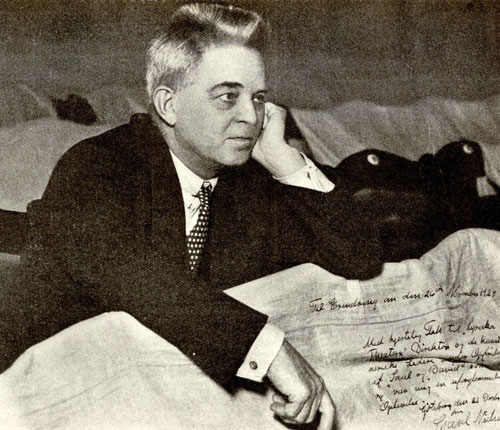
Nielsen at a 1928 rehearsal of Saul og David in Gothenburg.

From 1916, Nielsen taught at the Royal Academy where he became director in 1931, shortly before his death. He also had private students in his earlier days in order to supplement his income. As a result of his teaching, Nielsen has exerted considerable influence on classical music in Denmark. Among his most successful pupils were the composers Thorvald Aagaard, remembered in particular for his songs, Harald Agersnap, both a conductor and orchestral composer, and Jørgen Bentzon who composed choral and chamber music mainly for his folk music school (Københavns Folkemusikskole). Among his other students were the musicologist Knud Jeppesen, the pianist Herman Koppel, the academy professor and symphony composer Poul Schierbeck, the organist Emilius Bangert who played at Roskilde Cathedral, and Nancy Dalberg, one of Nielsen's private students who helped with the orchestration of Aladdin. Nielsen also instructed the conductor and choirmaster Mogens Wöldike, remembered for his interpretations of Baroque music, and Rudolph Simonsen, the pianist and composer who became director of the Academy after Nielsen's death.

The Carl Nielsen Society maintains a listing of performances of Nielsen's works, classified by region (Denmark, Scandinavia, Europe apart from Scandinavia and outside Europe) which demonstrates that his music is regularly performed throughout the world. The concerti and symphonies feature frequently in these listings. The Carl Nielsen International Competition commenced in the 1970s under the auspices of the Odense Symphony Orchestra. A four-yearly violin competition has been held there since 1980. Flute and clarinet competitions were later added, but these have now been discontinued. An international Organ Competition, founded by the city of Odense, became associated with the Nielsen competition in 2009, but from 2015 will be organized separately, based in Odense Cathedral.

In his home country, the Carl Nielsen Museum, in Odense, is dedicated to Nielsen and his wife, Anne Marie. The composer is featured on the 100 kroner note issued by the Danish National Bank from 1997 to 2010. His image was selected in recognition of his contribution to Danish music compositions such as his opera Maskarade, his Espansiva symphony and his many songs including "Danmark, nu blunder den lyse nat".

Several special events were scheduled on or around 9 June 2015 to commemorate the 150th anniversary of Nielsen's birth. In addition to many performances in Denmark, concerts were programmed in cities across Europe, including London, Leipzig, Kraków, Gothenburg, Helsinki and Vienna, and even further afield in Japan, Egypt and New York. For 9 June, Nielsen's birthday, the Danish National Symphony Orchestra presented a programme in Copenhagen's DR Concert Hall featuring Hymnus amoris, the Clarinet Concerto and Symphony No. 4 for a broadcast extending across Europe and the United States. The Danish Royal Opera has programmed Maskarade and a new production (directed by David Pountney) of Saul og David. During 2015, the Danish Quartet scheduled performances of Nielsen's string quartets in Denmark, Israel, Germany, Norway and the UK (at the Cheltenham Music Festival). In the UK, the BBC Philharmonic prepared a concert series on Nielsen beginning on 9 June in Manchester. Nielsen's Maskarade overture was also the first item for the opening night of the 2015 BBC Promenade Concerts in London, while his compositions featured in five other concerts of the Prom season. The city of Odense, which has strong connections with Nielsen, developed an extensive programme of concerts and cultural events for the anniversary year.

Minor planet 6058 Carlnielsen is named in his honor.
