= Aladdin (Nielsen) =

Theatre score and suite by Carl Nielsen

Aladdin, or the Wonderful Lamp
- Theatre score & suite by Carl Nielsen
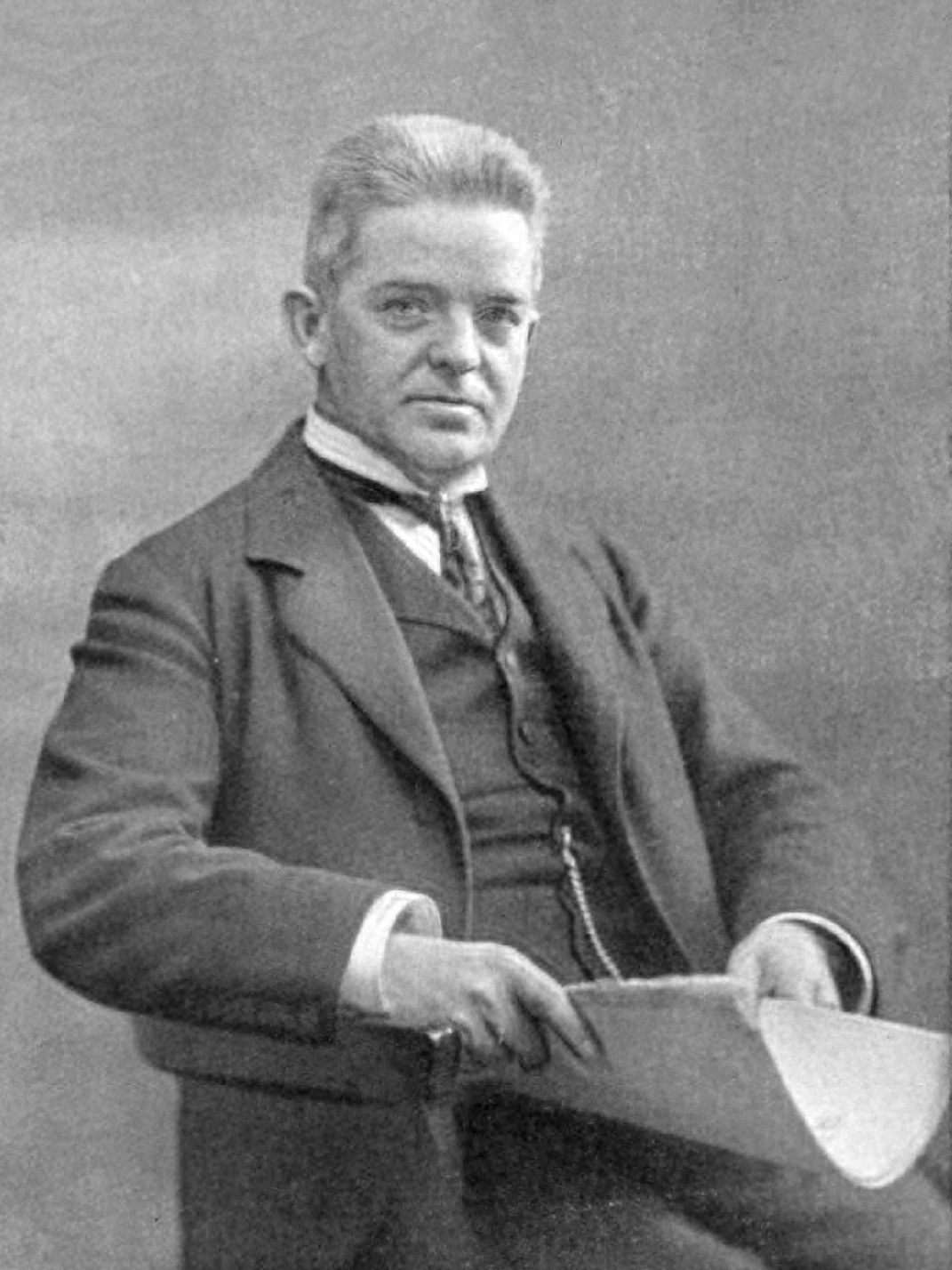
- The composer (1917)
- Native name: Aladdin, eller Den forunderlige Lampe
- Catalogue: FS 89; CNW 17
- Opus: 34
- Text: play by Adam Oehlenschläger (1805)
- Language: Danish
- Composed: 1917–1919

Premiere
- Date: 15 February 1919 (Part I); 22 February 1919 (Part II)
- Location: Royal Danish Theatre; Copenhagen, Denmark
- Conductor: Ferdinand Hemme
- Performers: Royal Danish Orchestra

Aladdin, or the Wonderful Lamp (in Danish: Aladdin, eller Den forunderlige Lampe; typically shortened to just Aladdin), Op. 34 (FS 89; CNW 17), is theatre music for soloists, mixed choir, and orchestra written from 1917 to 1919 by the Danish composer Carl Nielsen to accompany the Danish playwright Adam Oehlenschläger's 1805 "dramatic fairy tale" ("dramatisk eventyr") of the same name. The play is a five-act retelling of the "Aladdin" story from the Middle Eastern folklore anthology, One Thousand and One Nights.

The play, albeit divided into two parts, received its premiere at the Royal Danish Theatre in Copenhagen, respectively on 15 February and 22 February 1919; Ferdinand Hemme conducted the Royal Danish Orchestra. For each act, Nielsen provided extensive original music, and the complete score is the composer's third longest work, exceeded only by to his operas, Saul and David (Saul og David; 1902) and Maskarade (1905).

== Background ==
Nielsen composed much of the music in Skagen during the summer of 1918, completing it after returning to Copenhagen in January 1919. He experienced major difficulties with the work as the director, Johannes Poulsen, had used the orchestra pit for an extended stage, leaving the orchestra cramped below a majestic staircase on the set. When Poulsen cut out large parts of the music during final rehearsals and changed the sequence of dances, Nielsen demanded that his name be removed from the posters and the programme. In fact, the theatre production in February 1919 was not very successful and was withdrawn after only 15 performances.

== Music ==
=== Complete score ===
The complete score, lasting over 80 minutes, is Nielsen's longest work apart from his operas. Demonstrating great inventiveness, Nielsen's enriched style can be observed in the musical language he used for the exotic dances, paving the way for his Fifth Symphony. In May 1992 a recording of virtually the entire score was made by the Danish Radio Symphony Orchestra and Chamber Choir with Gennady Rozhdestvensky.

=== Aladdin suite ===
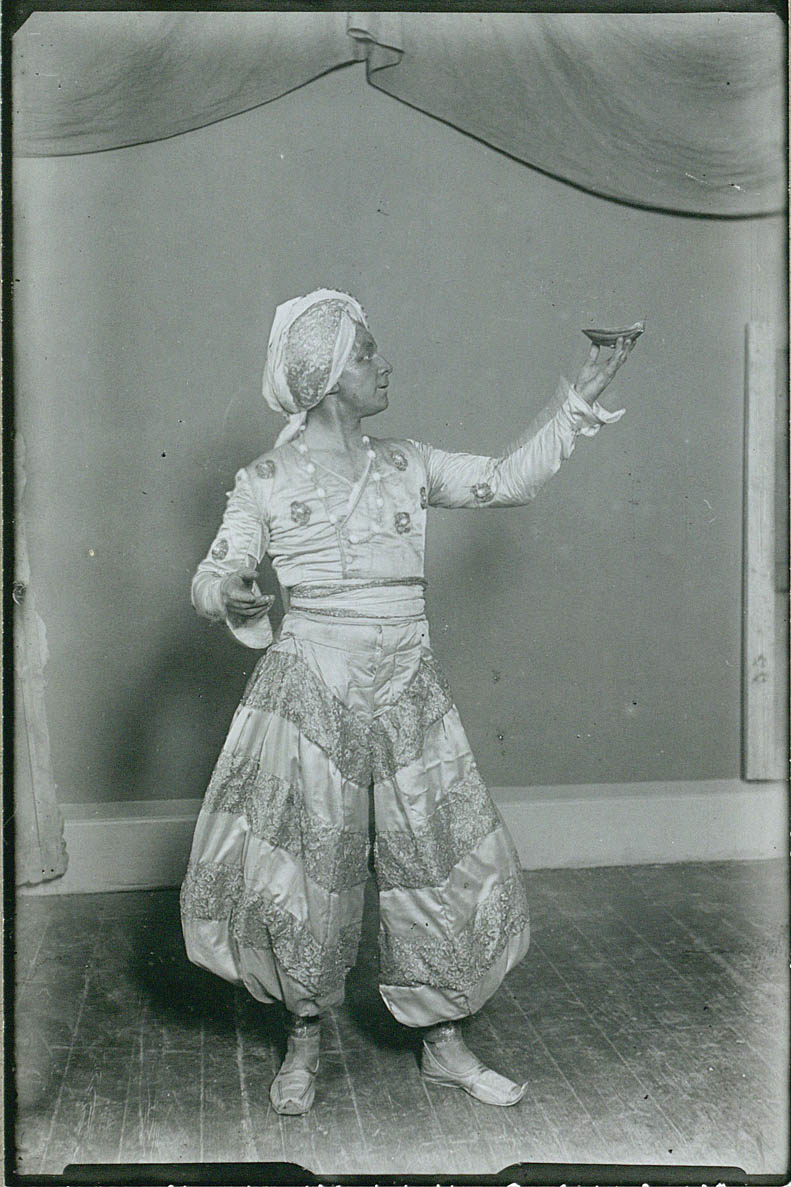
Johannes Poulsen as Aladdin at the Royal Theatre in Copenhagen

Nielsen frequently conducted extracts from Aladdin to great popular acclaim both in Denmark and abroad. The music was successfully presented at London’s Queen's Hall on 22 June 1923 and at 12 performances of Aladdin at the Deutsches Schauspielhaus in Hamburg in November and December 1929. Nielsen had been scheduled to conduct extracts with the Radio Symphony Orchestra on 1 October 1931 when he suffered a major heart attack. Lying on a hospital bed, he was nevertheless able to listen to the Oriental March, Hindu Dance and Negro Dance on a crystal set before he died the following day. The extracts were published in 1940 as the Aladdin suite. Its seven parts are:

- Oriental Festival March
- Aladdin's Dream/Dance of the Morning Mist
- Hindu Dance
- Chinese Dance
- The Marketplace in Isphahan
- Dance of the Prisoners
- Negro Dance

A transcription for piano of the Oriental Festival March was published by Borup's Musikforlag in Copenhagen in 1926. On the basis of information from the Carl Nielsen Society, the Aladdin Suite is currently one of Nielsen's most widely performed works.

=== Three songs ===
Nielsen published Aladdin, three songs from the play by A. Oehlenschlæger in 1919 as his Opus 34. The songs are:

- Cithar, lad min Bøn dig røre
- Visselulle nu, Barnlil!
- Alt Maanen oprejst staar

== Discography ==
The table below lists commercially available recordings of the complete Aladdin Suite:

No.	Conductor	Ensemble	Rec. (Note: Refers to the year in which the performers recorded the work; this may not be the same as the year in which the recording was first released to the general public.)	Time	Recording venue	Label	Ref.
1	Myung-Whun Chung	Gothenburg Symphony Orchestra (1)	1983	21:27	Gothenburg Concert Hall	BIS	
2	Tamás Vetö	Odense Symphony Orchestra	1985	25:18	Odense Concert Hall	Unicorn-Kanchana	
3	Esa-Pekka Salonen	Swedish Radio Symphony Orchestra	1989	23:11	Berwald Hall	CBS Masterworks	
4	Herbert Blomstedt	San Francisco Symphony	1989	25:01	Davies Symphony Hall	Decca	
5	Neeme Järvi	Gothenburg Symphony Orchestra (2)	1995	23:18	Gothenburg Concert Hall	Deutsche Grammophon	
6	Niklas Willén	South Jutland Symphony Orchestra	2002	24:55	Musikhuset, Sønderborg	Naxos	
7	Douglas Bostock	Royal Liverpool Philharmonic Orchestra	2003	26:02	Philharmonic Hall, Liverpool	Classico	
8	Lance Friedel	Aarhus Symphony Orchestra (1)	2004	24:16	Frichsparker, Aarhus	MSR Classics	
9	Dorrit Matson	New York Scandia Symphony	2005	25:56	Trinity Church	Centaur	
10	Paavo Järvi	Philharmonia Orchestra	2016	26:35	Henry Wood Hall, London	Signum Classics	
11	Debashish Chaudhuri	Karlovy Vary Symphony Orchestra	?	?	ArcoDiva Studio	ArcoDiva	
12	Ensemble Midtvest	Ensemble Midtvest	2018	27:19 (Excerpts, Arr. M.O. Jones)	Den Jyske Sangskole, Herning, Denmark	First Hand Records	
