= Torben Schousboe =

Danish music researcher and writer

Torben Schousboe (October 6, 1937-December 9, 2017 Odense) was a Danish music researcher and writer. After completing organ studies in 1960, he graduated from Copenhagen University, where he taught from 1972 to 1996. He is known above all for his work on Carl Nielsen. In 1983 he published, in collaboration with Nielsen's daughter Irmelin Eggert Møller, the composer's diaries and correspondence with his wife Anne Marie Carl-Nielsen.

Schousboe was organist and cantor in Copenhagen's Emdrup Church from its opening in 1961 until 1996. He taught at the University of Copenhagen's Musicology Institute, specializing in the history of music and music theory. He catalogued the works of Carl Nielsen in collaboration with Dan Fog: Carl Nielsen: Kompositioner, en bibliografi (1965).

== Publications ==
- Schousboe, Torben, ed. (1983). Dagbøger og brevveksling med Anne Marie Carl-Nielsen [Diaries and exchange of letters with Anne Marie Carl-Nielsen] (in Danish). Selected in collaboration with Irmelin Eggert Møller (née Carl-Nielsen). Copenhagen: Gyldendal. ISBN 978-87-00-03901-8. Two volumes.
