= Valdemar Tofte =

Danish violinist

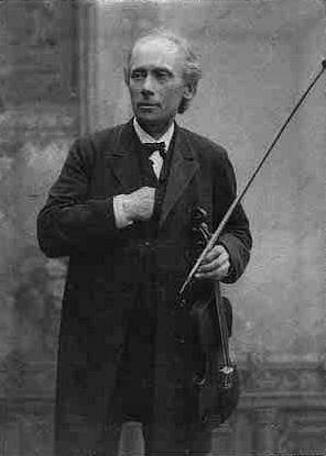
- Born: Lars Valdemar Tofte; 21 October 1832; Copenhagen, Denmark
- Died: 28 May 1907 (aged 74); Copenhagen, Denmark
- Occupation: Classical violinist
- Years active: 1856–1904

Lars Valdemar Tofte (21 October 1832 – 28 May 1907) was a Danish violinist who taught for a half century and trained over 300 of Denmark's violinists.

== Biography ==
Tofte was born on 21 October 1832 in Copenhagen, Denmark, to distiller Hans Larsen Tofte (1798–1857) and Mathilde Pedersen (1812–1867). The father, who loved music and was a good violinist, wanted his son to become a musician, particularly a violin virtuoso. To that end, he took Tofte at a young age to concerts to hear great artists like Miska Hauser, Hubert Léonard, Carl Moeser and François Prume. He also found skilled teachers: first Carl T. Petersen, violinist in Hans Christian Lumbye's orchestra, known for his beautiful bowing, and then Julius Semler of the Royal Danish Orchestra. In the fall of 1850, when the Music Society formed its own orchestra under the direction of Niels W. Gade, Tofte was one of its early violinists. Gade's recommendation was for Tofte to study with the "violin king" Joseph Joachim in Hannover. Tofte followed the advice and went to study with Joachim from 1853 to 1856; occasionally he studied with Louis Spohr in Kassel.

== Career ==
After his return, he made his debut in May 1856 with great acclaim in the Music Society Orchestra. He worked in this association as a soloist and performed chamber music concerts with a quartet consisting of Christian Schiørring, Vilhelm Christian Holm and Franz Neruda. In 1863 he was hired for the Royal Danish Orchestra, as a member and a soloist. He alternated as a soloist with Christian Schiørring, until his resignation in 1893.

When the Royal Danish Academy of Music was established in 1867, Tofte was appointed as the first violin teacher. For his long and important career he was in 1893 honored with the title of professor. He taught until 1904, training an entire school of violinists in Denmark. It is estimated that he taught over 300 violinists and almost two generations of artists, including Anton Svendsen, Frederik Hilmer, Frida Schytte, Fini Henriques, Frederik Rung, Victor Bendix, Carl Nielsen, and Georg Høeberg.

== Personal life ==
On 3 March 1866 in Trinity Church, Tofte married Ane Kirstine Pauline Willumsen (May 23, 1838 in Copenhagen – August 17, 1914 in Frederiksberg, daughter of haulage Jørgen Willumsen (1801–1854) and Marie Elisabeth Poulsen (1802–1879).

He died 28 May 1907 in Copenhagen and was buried at the Vestre Cemetery, with a gravestone in the Art Nouveau style designed by Thorvald Bindesbøll and erected in 1908.
