= Fini Henriques =

Danish composer and violinist

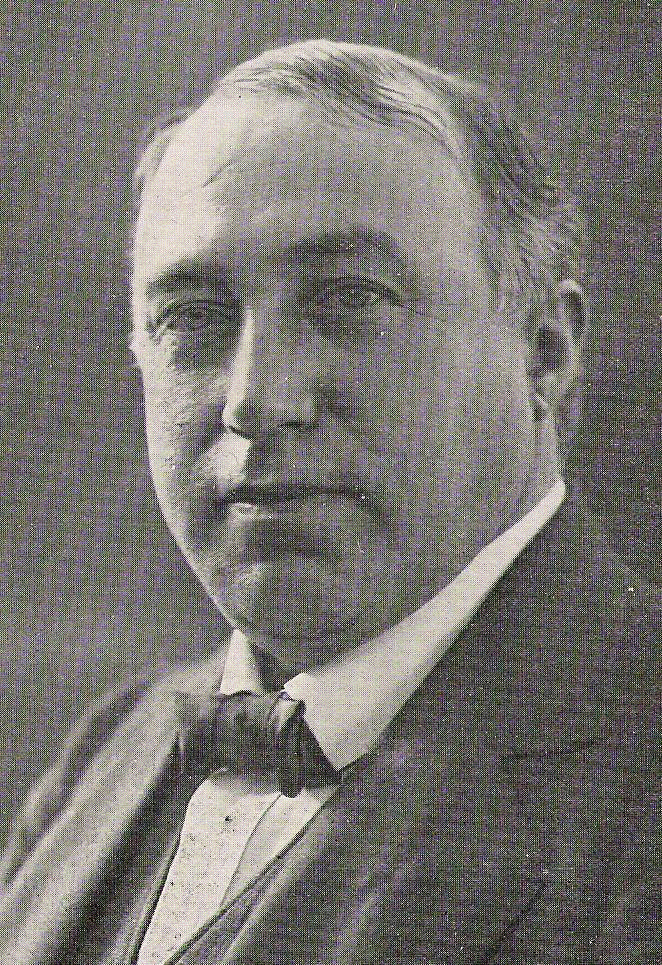

Valdemar Fini Henriques (baptized Finni) (20 October 1867 - 27 October 1940) was a Danish composer and violinist.

Henriques was born in Frederiksberg, Denmark. His parents were hospital inspector and justice counsel Vilhelm Moritz Henriques (1828-1889), who was of Jewish origin, and Marie Christine Rasmussen (1826-1913). He was brother-in-law to the doctor and philosopher Severin Christensen. Fini Henriques' son, musician Johan Henriques, was the concert master of the 2nd violin group in the Royal Chapel, where his father had worked for almost four years as a violinist.

He died in 1940 in Copenhagen, Denmark.

== Career ==
Henriques became a private student of the violinist Valdemar Tofte, who was the concert master of the chapel and professor at the Conservatory of Music, and of the chief director of the Royal Chapel, Johan Svendsen, after Niels W. Gade had advised him to go through the Conservatory of Music. From 1888 to 1891, he was in Berlin, where he studied with violinist Joseph Joachim and composer Woldemar Bargiel, who was half-brother to Clara Schumann and himself a student of Niels W. Gade. After his time in Copenhagen, he returned for one year to Germany and Austria. At the time of his return, he was employed in the Royal Chapel in 1892, initially as a violist and later as a violinist. After a clash with Frederik Rung, he resigned in 1896 to live a free life as a composer, educator, and concert violinist, a career that soon made him a popular figure. As a young man he developed a friendship with Carl Nielsen, which lasted until Nielsen's death in 1931.

His teacher Joseph Joachim was the greatest violinist of the day, but Fini Henriques concentrated more on the smaller forms. He formed his own string quartet and founded the chamber music association Musiksamfundet, which he chaired until 1931. He also traveled as a concert soloist, chamber musician, and conductor numerous times in the Nordic countries as well as to Paris and Berlin. He sat on the board of the Danish Composers' Society and was Knight of Dannebrog (1921) and Dannebrogsmand (1937).

== Music ==
Henriques' music is considered open and welcoming, and was very popular in his lifetime. He wrote mostly for his own instrument—the violin—in addition to songs and piano music. In addition to various pieces for chamber crews and smaller orchestral works, Henriques has written symphonies and ballets. His works include The Little Mermaid (1909) and Tata, as well as a lot of other stage music, including the opera Stærstikkeren (1927) with text by CM Norman-Hansen and Vølund Smed (composed 1896) with text by Aage Barfoed after Holger Drachmann.

== See also ==
- List of Danish composers
