= Culture of Denmark =

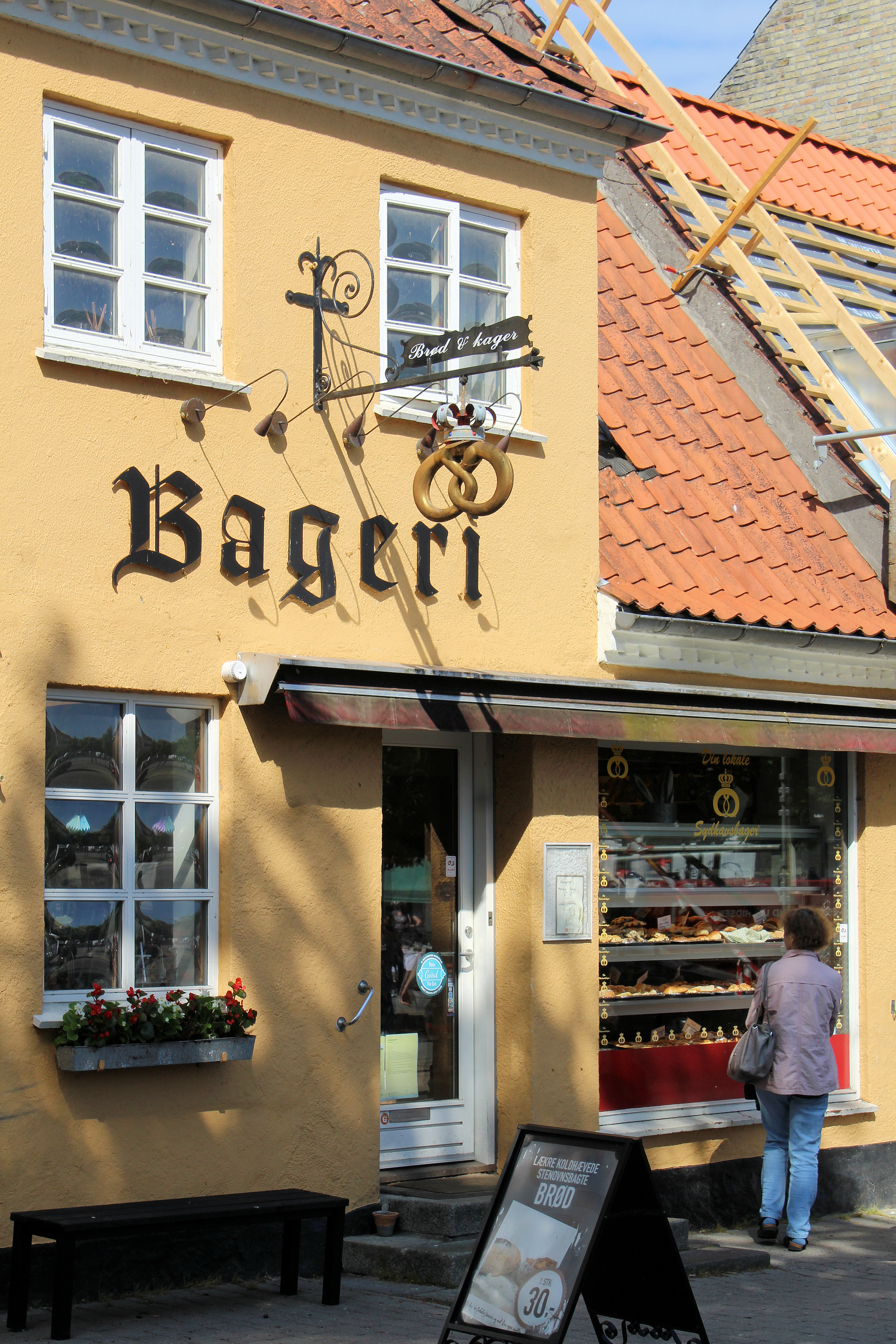
Danish bakery in Maribo

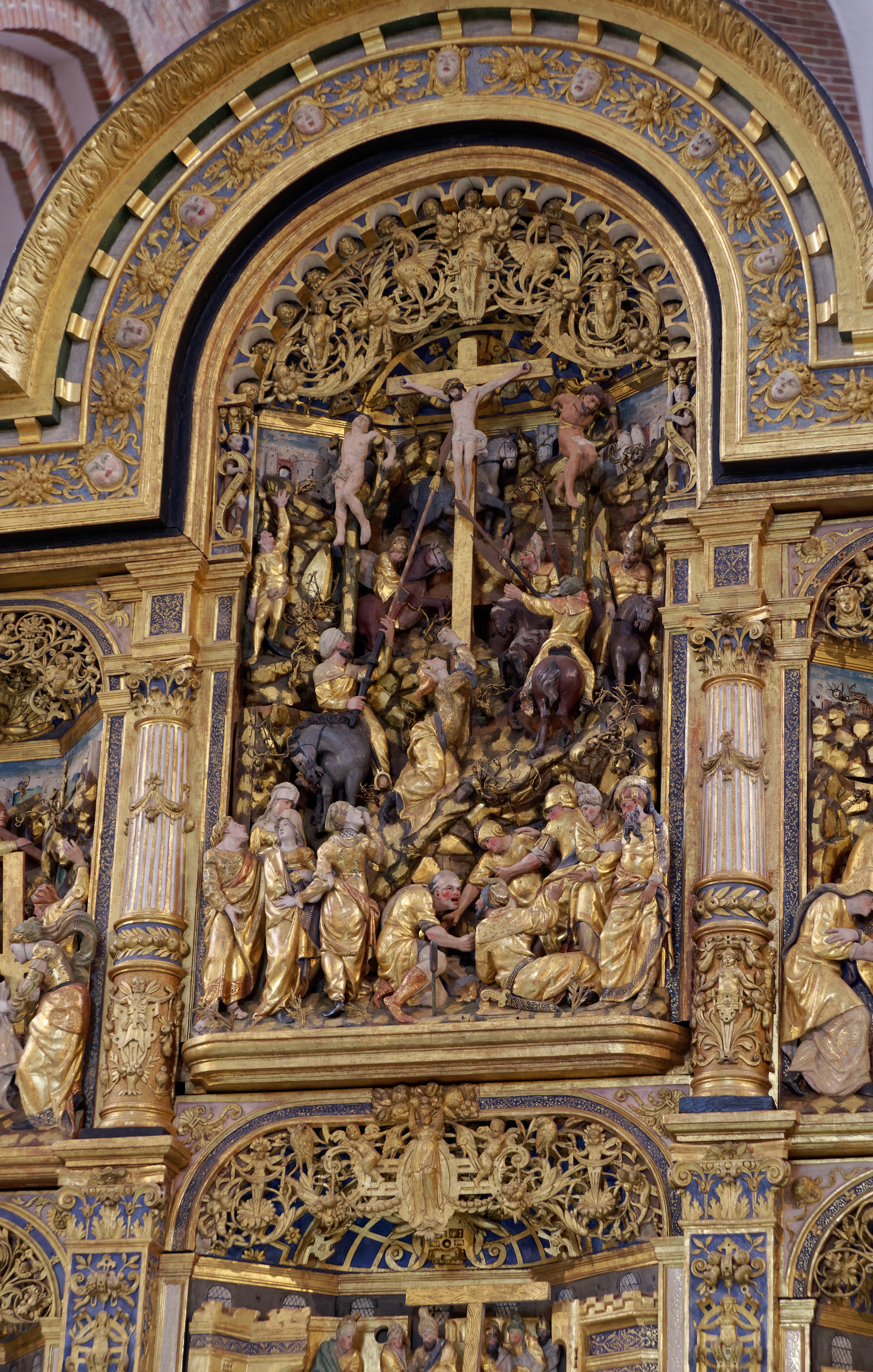
Altar of Roskilde Cathedral

The culture of Denmark has a rich artistic and scientific heritage. The fairy tales of Hans Christian Andersen (1805–1875), the philosophical essays of Søren Kierkegaard (1813–1855), the short stories of Karen Blixen, penname Isak Dinesen, (1885–1962), the plays of Ludvig Holberg (1684–1754), modern authors such as Herman Bang and Nobel laureate Henrik Pontoppidan and the dense, aphoristic poetry of Piet Hein (1905–1996), have earned international recognition, as have the symphonies of Carl Nielsen (1865–1931).

From the mid-1990s, Danish films have attracted international attention, especially those associated with Dogme 95 like those of Lars Von Trier. Denmark has had a strong tradition of movie making and Carl Theodor Dreyer has been recognised as one of the world's greatest film directors. The astronomical discoveries of Tycho Brahe (1546–1601), Ludwig A. Colding's (1815–1888) neglected articulation of the principle of conservation of energy, and the foundational contributions to atomic physics of Niels Bohr (1885–1962); in this century Lene Vestergaard Hau (born 1959) in quantum physics involving the stopping of light, advances in nano-technology, and contributions to the understanding of Bose-Einstein Condensates, demonstrate the range and endurance of Danish scientific achievement.

Culture and the arts thrive as a result of the proportionately high amount of government funding they receive, much of which is administered by local authorities so as to involve citizens directly. Thanks to a system of grants, Danish artists are able to devote themselves to their work while museums, theatres, and the film institute receive national support.

Copenhagen, the capital, is home to many famous sites and attractions, including Tivoli Gardens, Amalienborg Palace (home of the Danish monarchy), Christiansborg Palace, Copenhagen Cathedral, Rosenborg Castle, Opera House, Frederik's Church (Marble Church), Thorvaldsens Museum, Rundetårn, Nyhavn and The Little Mermaid sculpture.

== Hygge ==
Similar to other Scandinavian cultures, a fundamental aspect of Danish culture is hygge. Hygge, meaning "snug"; is a concept that evokes a "cosiness" that cannot be easily described due to being more of a mood, particularly when relaxing with good friends or loved ones. Christmas time is a true moment of hygge, as is grilling a pølse (Danish sausage) and drinking a beer on a long summer evening. It is suspected the concept of hygge is part of the reason Danes and other Scandinavians score high on happiness.

== Danish Christmas ==
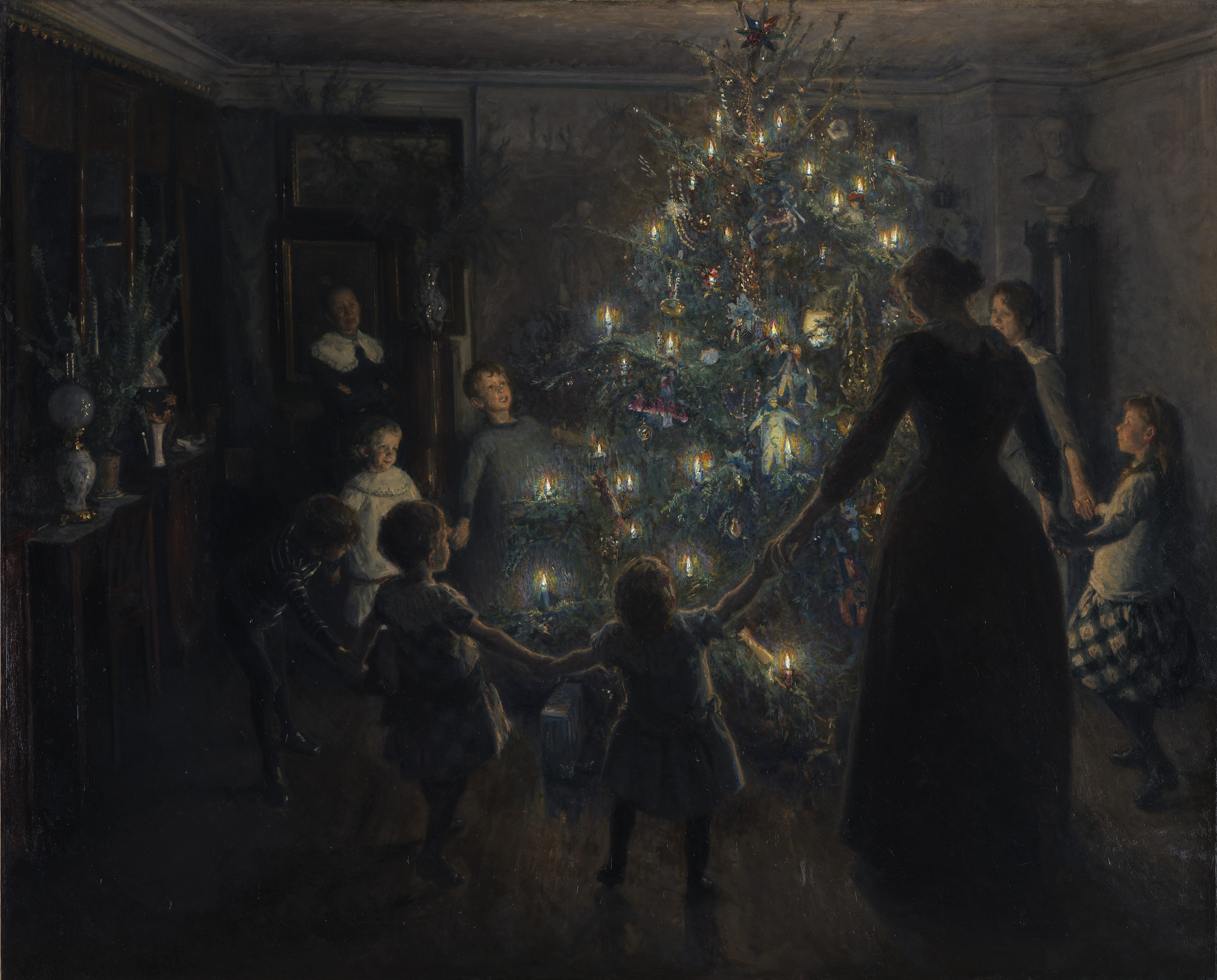
Viggo Johansen: Happy Christmas (1891)

The Danish word for the Christmas holiday is Jul, from the Old Norse jól, the term for "midwinter", itself cognate with the English word, yule. Midwinter celebrations were an important part of Scandinavian culture since prehistoric times, and the term was retained to refer to "Christmas" after Christianization. In many countries Christmas is celebrated on 25 December, but in Denmark, and in the other Scandinavian countries, the most important day for celebrations is Christmas Eve on the 24th when the family comes together. The morning can be spent in various ways but most often it is the time when preparations are made for the evening. Juleaften (Danish for Christmas Eve) or Yule Eve starts around 6 p.m. when a traditional dinner (Julemiddag) is served. Afterwards, the candles on the Christmas tree are lit and the family dance around it singing Christmas songs and carols and subsequently exchange presents.

== Folklore ==
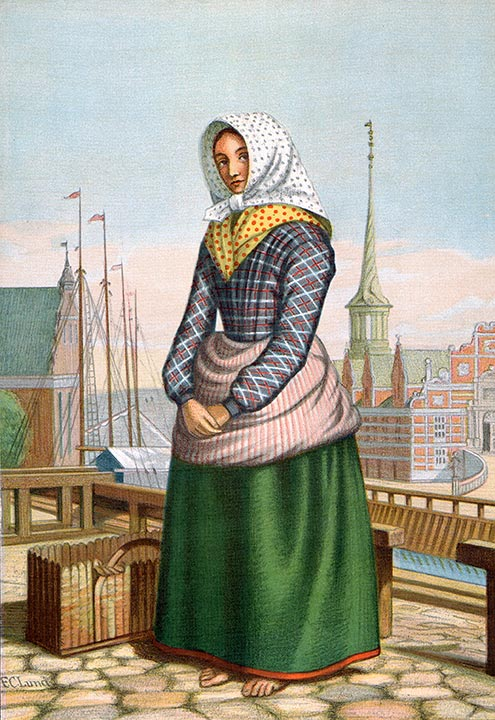
Frederik Christian Lund: Girl from Skovshoved

Danish folklore is made up of folk tales, legends, songs, music, dancing, popular beliefs and traditions, mostly communicated by the inhabitants of towns and villages across the country. Many of these were passed on from generation to generation by word of mouth. As in neighbouring countries, interest in folklore grew with an emerging feeling of national consciousness in 19th-century Denmark. Researchers travelled across the country collecting innumerable folktales, songs and sayings while observing traditional dress in the various regions. Folklore today is part of the national heritage, represented in particular by national and local traditions, songs, folk dances and literature.

Today's folk dancing in Denmark dates back to the beginning of the 20th century, when there was renewed interest in the national heritage. A number of groups began to revive the music, dances and costumes of past generations. In 1901, the Society for the Promotion of Danish Folk Dancing (Foreningen til Folkedansens Fremme) was founded in Copenhagen, leading to local dancing societies throughout the country. Today there are more than 12,000 folk dancers in 219 local clubs, providing courses in music, dancing and dressmaking.

The traditional costumes of Denmark, though varying from region to region, date back roughly to the period between 1750 and 1900 when clothes were often home-made from yarn spun from wool or flax. In rural communities, the fabrication of garments for both family members and servants was an important part of everyday life. The artist Frederik Christian Lund, who had travelled across Denmark as a soldier in the First Schleswig War, took an interest in sketching people in local costumes in various parts of the country. He completed his collection of 31 coloured sketches in 1864, publishing them as coloured lithographs in Danske Nationaldragter (Danish National Costumes).

Numerous Danish folktales contain a range of mythical figures such as trolls, elves, goblins and wights as well as figures from Nordic mythology like giants and lygtemænd (hobby lanterns). The nisse is a particularly well known legendary figure in Danish folklore, apparently dating back to pre-Christian times when it was believed there were household gods. Traditionally each farm had its own nisse living on the loft or in a stable. Dressed in grey with a pointed red cap, he was no taller than a 10-year-old boy. The nisse would be helpful if treated well, for instance by offering him a bowl of porridge with a clump of butter at night, but, failing good treatment, he could become quite troublesome and mean.

Today, nisser are associated with Christmas, with some of them being portrayed as Santa Claus's helpers on Greenland. Whilst the superstition regarding the nisse has faded, it is still traditional for households with children to pretend that a nisse lives in the attic, or elsewhere in the house, and to offer it porridge in December. The parents will then, for the duration of the month, play mischievous, but harmless, jokes on the children. The nisse also provides daily gifts, that are laid in a sock, which is hung op on a wall at the start of the month.

== Cuisine ==
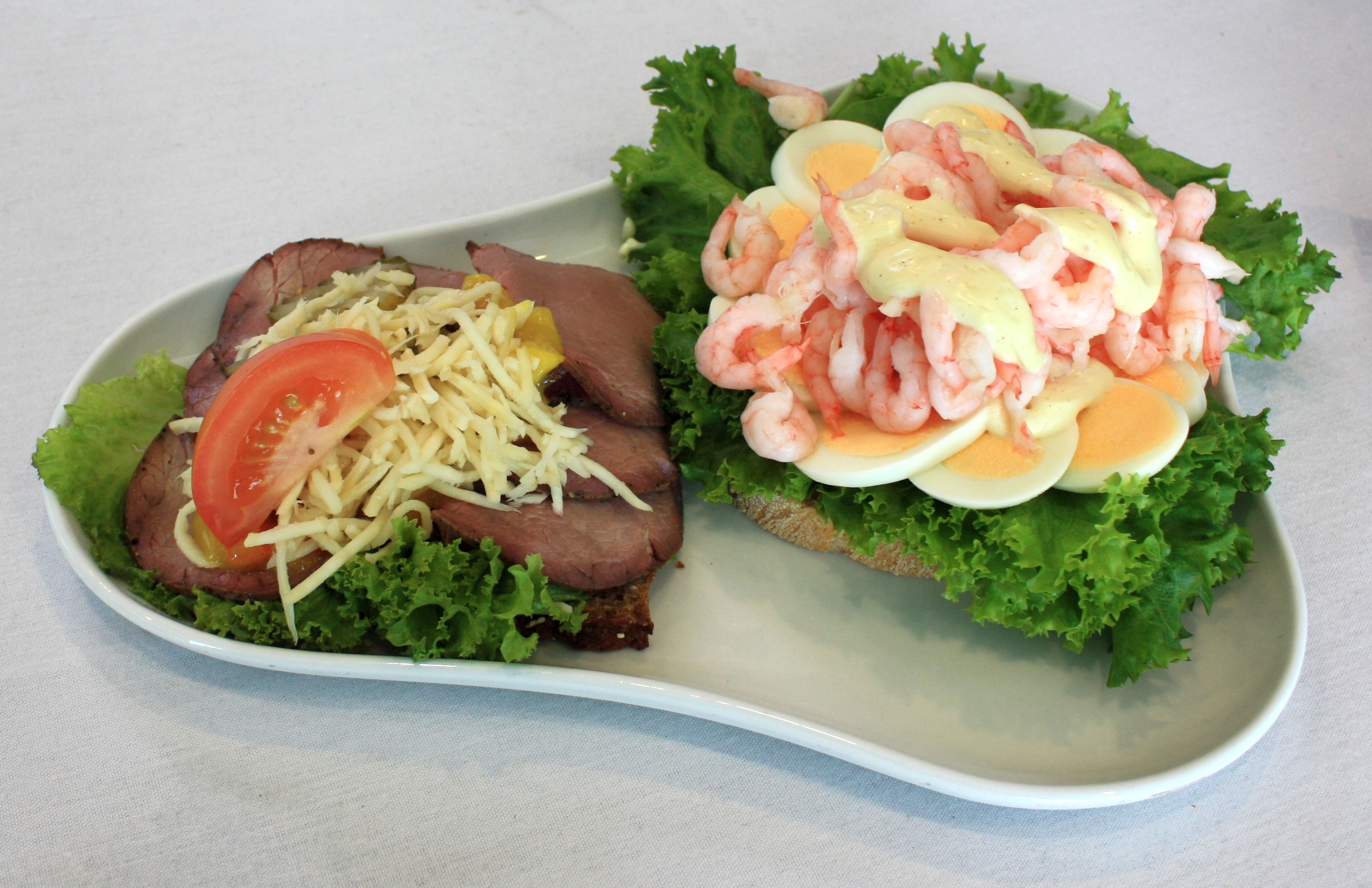
Smørrebrød (open sandwich). Left: roast beef with remoulade, grated horseradish and tomato on Danish rye bread. Right: egg, prawns, lemon and mayonnaise on white bread.

Perhaps the most typically Danish contribution to the meals of the day is the traditional lunch or smørrebrød consisting of open sandwiches, usually on thinly sliced rugbrød. The meal usually begins with seafood such as marinated herring, smoked eel, crab, or breaded plaice filets with remoulade and moves on with slices of roast pork or beef, frikadeller (meatballs), hams and liver pâté. The sandwiches are richly garnished with onion rings, radish slices, cucumbers, tomato slices, parsley, remoulade or mayonnaise. The meal is mostly accompanied by beer, on occasion also by shots of ice-cold snaps or akvavit.

In the evening, hot meals are usually served. Traditional dishes include fried fish, roast pork with red cabbage, pot-roasted chicken, pot-roast and slow cooked beef, meat balls, or pork chops. Game is sometimes served in the autumn. Steaks are now increasingly popular, but is a modern addition.

A popular traditional Danish dessert, especially around Christmas, consists of æbleskiver, rather like small pancake doughnuts which are fried in butter in a special pan and are served hot with jam and sugar. Traditionally, they were made with small pieces of apple in the middle which is why they are called æbleskiver, literally "apple slices".

In recent years, development of the New Danish cuisine based on the rediscovery of local ingredients presented in interesting new recipes has led to a significant number of new, highly acclaimed restaurants in Copenhagen and the provinces, several with Michelin stars. This in turn has led to new developments in food production with a series of new products based on organic farming.

== Sports ==
Sports are popular in Denmark, and its citizens participate in and watch a wide variety. The national sport is football (soccer), with the most notable results being qualifying for the European Championships six times in a row (1984–2004) and winning the Championship in 1992. Other significant achievements include winning the Confederations Cup in 1995 and reaching the quarter-final of the 1998 World Cup.

Denmark's numerous beaches and resorts are popular locations for fishing, canoeing, kayaking and a broad-range of other water-themed sports.

In speedway racing Denmark has won several world championships, including the Speedway World Cup in 2006 and 2008. Other popular sports include golf, mostly popular among the older demographic; tennis, in which Denmark is successful on a professional level; Danish Rugby Union, which dates back to 1950; and indoor sports such as badminton, handball and various forms of gymnastics.

As of January 2012, the national handball team are the current reigning European champions and the team with most medals won in European championship history on the men's side with a total of five medals, those being two gold medals (2008, 2012), and three bronze medals (2002, 2004 & 2006). And in 2016 Denmark's handball team won the gold medal for men at the Olympics in Rio.

=== Cycling ===
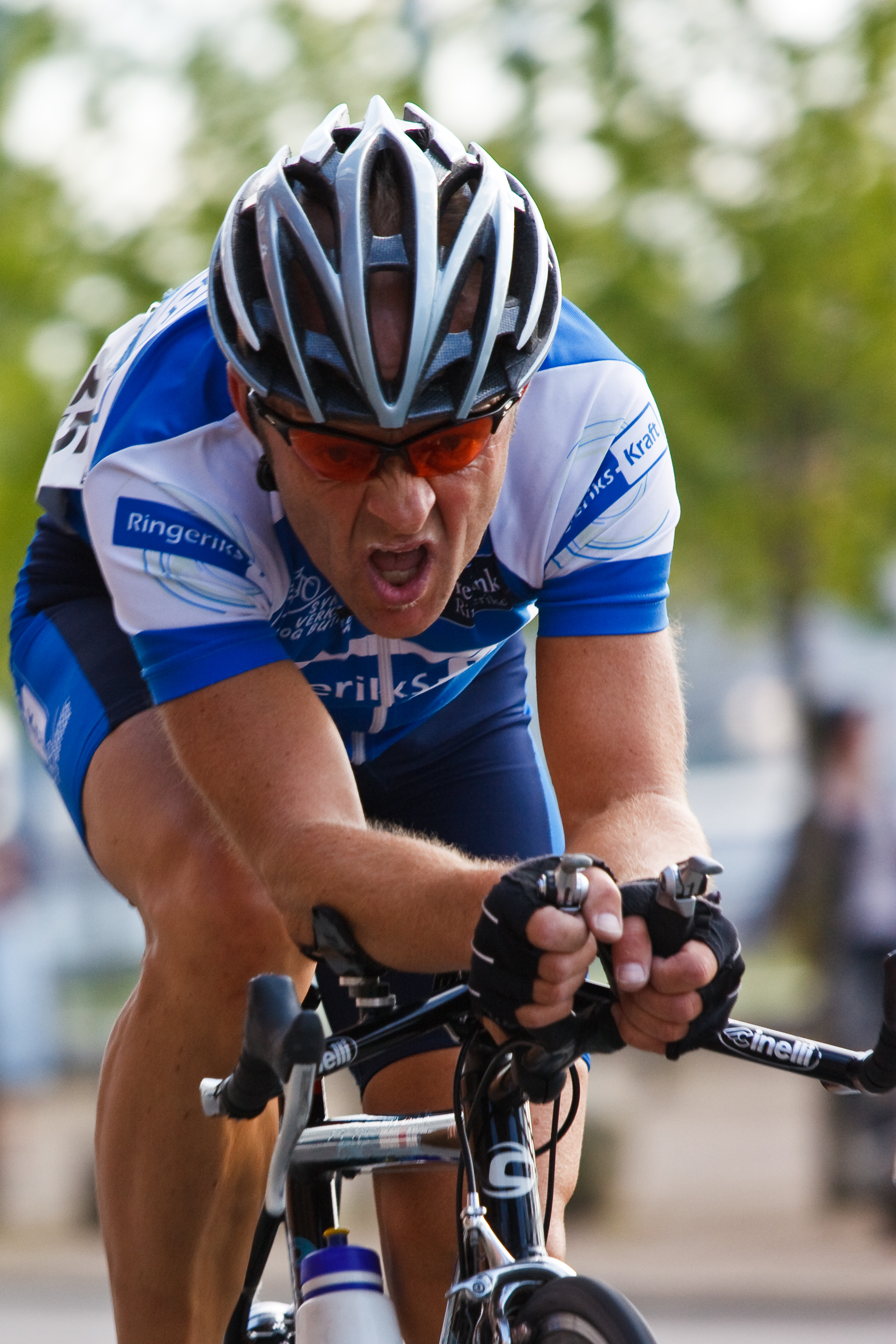
Cycling trial at the Copenhagen World Outgames

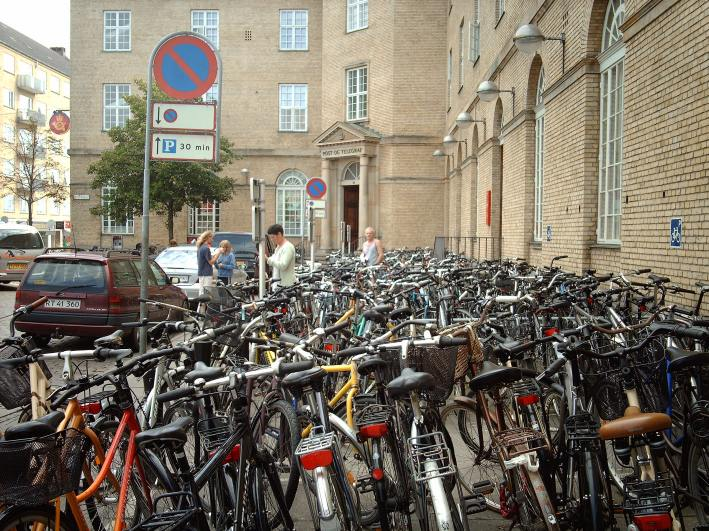
Bikes parked in the centre of Aarhus

In recent years, Denmark has made a mark as a strong cycling nation, with Bjarne Riis winning Tour de France in 1996, and Michael Rasmussen reaching King of the Mountains status, in the Tour 2005 and 2006. The Tour d’France has been won for two consecutive years (2022 and 2023) by Jonas Vingegaard.

Most Danes are active cyclists, often using their bikes to commute to work or to go off on trips at the weekend. With its well-engineered cycle paths, Copenhagen is especially suited to city cycling. Every day 1.3 million km are cycled in the city, with 36% of all citizens commuting to work, school or university by bicycle. Cycling is generally perceived as a healthier, environmentally friendlier, cheaper and often quicker way around town than by public transport or car and it is therefore municipal policy for the number of commuters by bike to go up to 40% by 2012 and 50% by 2015.

Odense has been named the "bicycle city of the year" because of the great number of bicycle lanes in the city. A complete network of 350 km all-weather serviced lanes exists in the town.

During the summer months, there are free "City Bikes" stationed at various spots in the downtown area of Copenhagen, Aarhus and Aalborg. The idea is that anyone can take a bike from one of the spots, ride it to one of the other spots and leave it there for the next person. There are many National and regional bicycle routes throughout Denmark. They are all marked and include rest areas with benches and other necessities.

== Fine arts ==
=== Painting ===
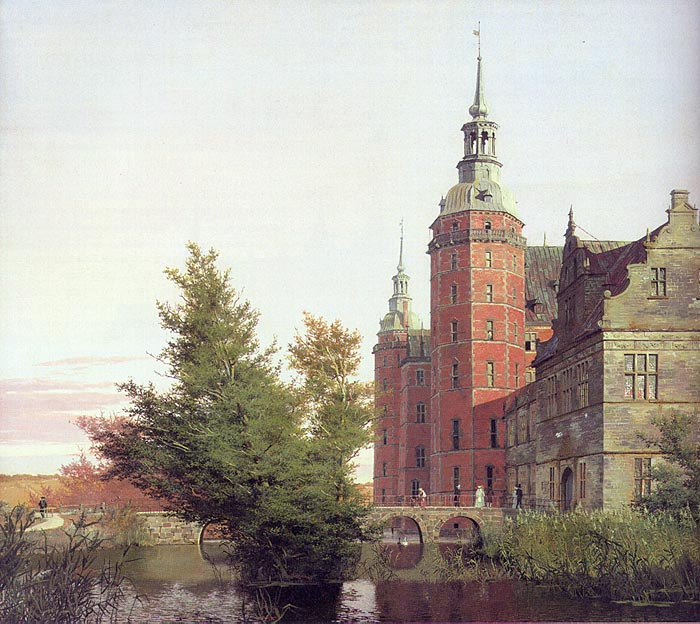
Frederiksborg Castle by Christen Købke, 1836

Danish painting goes back hundreds of years. Earlier work is often manifested in churches, for example in the form of frescos such as those from the 16th-century artist known as the Elmelunde Master. But it was not until the beginning of the 19th century that the Golden Age of Danish Painting emerged with a marked increase in truly Danish art inspired by the country itself with its lifestyle and traditions. Christoffer Wilhelm Eckersberg was an important influence on the following generation's study of nature, in which landscape painting came to the fore. He had many successful students, including Wilhelm Bendz (1804–1832), Christen Købke (1810–48), Martinus Rørbye (1803–1848), Constantin Hansen (1804–1880), Jørgen Roed (1808–1888), Wilhelm Marstrand (1810–1873), C. A. Jensen (1792–1870), J. Th. Lundbye (1818–1848), and P. C. Skovgaard (1817–1875).

Some years later, a number of painters including P. S. Krøyer (1851–1909) and Michael (1849–1927) and Anna Ancher (1859–1935) moved to Skagen in the far north of Jylland to paint the natural surroundings and local people. In due course, the town developed into an artists' colony. A little later, a similar phenomenon developed on Fyn with artists such as Johannes Larsen (1867–1961). Vilhelm Hammershøi is another known painter.

Collections of modern art enjoy unusually attractive settings at the Louisiana Museum north of Copenhagen, at the North Jylland Art Museum in Aalborg and at the ARoS art museum in Aarhus. The National Museum of Art and the Glyptotek, both in Copenhagen, contain treasures of Danish and international art.

=== Sculpture ===
The Little Mermaid statue in Langelinie

Danish sculpture as a nationally recognized art form can be traced back to 1752 when Jacques Saly was commissioned to execute King Frederick V of Denmark while on horseback. While Bertel Thorvaldsen (1770–1844) was undoubtedly the country's most prominent contributor of his time, many other sculptors also produced notable works in the areas of Neoclassicism, Realism, and Historicism, the latter resulting from a growing consciousness of a national identity. From modern times, many notable works of Surrealism and Modernism has been produced, inspired by European trends, especially those from Paris. Present notable Danish sculptors includes Michael Kvium, Hein Heinsen and Bjørn Nørgaard, but the field holds many skilled practitioners and the styles has diversified greatly.

=== Literature ===
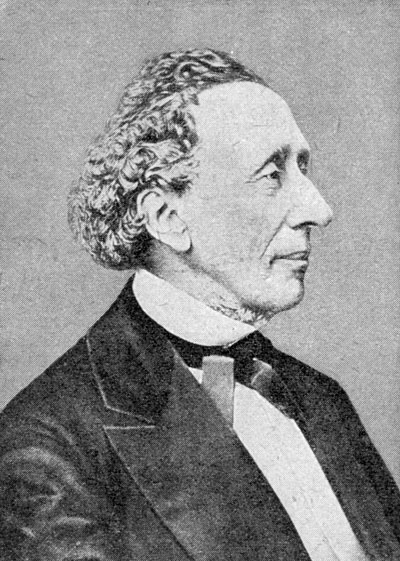
Hans Christian Andersen

The principal contributors to Danish literature are undoubtedly Hans Christian Andersen (1805–1875) with his fairy tales, the philosopher Søren Kierkegaard (1813–1855), storyteller Karen Blixen (1885–1962), playwright Ludvig Holberg (1684–1754), and modern authors such as Henrik Pontoppidan and Herman Bang.

Among today's Danish writers, probably the best-known to international readers is Peter Høeg (Smilla's Sense of Snow; Borderliners). Benny Andersen wrote poems, short stories, and music. Poems by both writers have been translated into English by the Curbstone Press. Klaus Rifbjerg has published over 100 novels as well as poetry, short stories and TV plays. Two of his works have been translated into English: Witness to the Future and War. Kirsten Thorup's novel Baby, winner of the 1980 Pegasus Prize, is published in English by the University of Louisiana Press. The psychological thrillers of Anders Bodelsen also appear in English as do some of the novels of intrigue by Leif Davidsen. Suzanne Brøgger and Vita Andersen focus largely on the changing roles of women in society.

=== Architecture ===
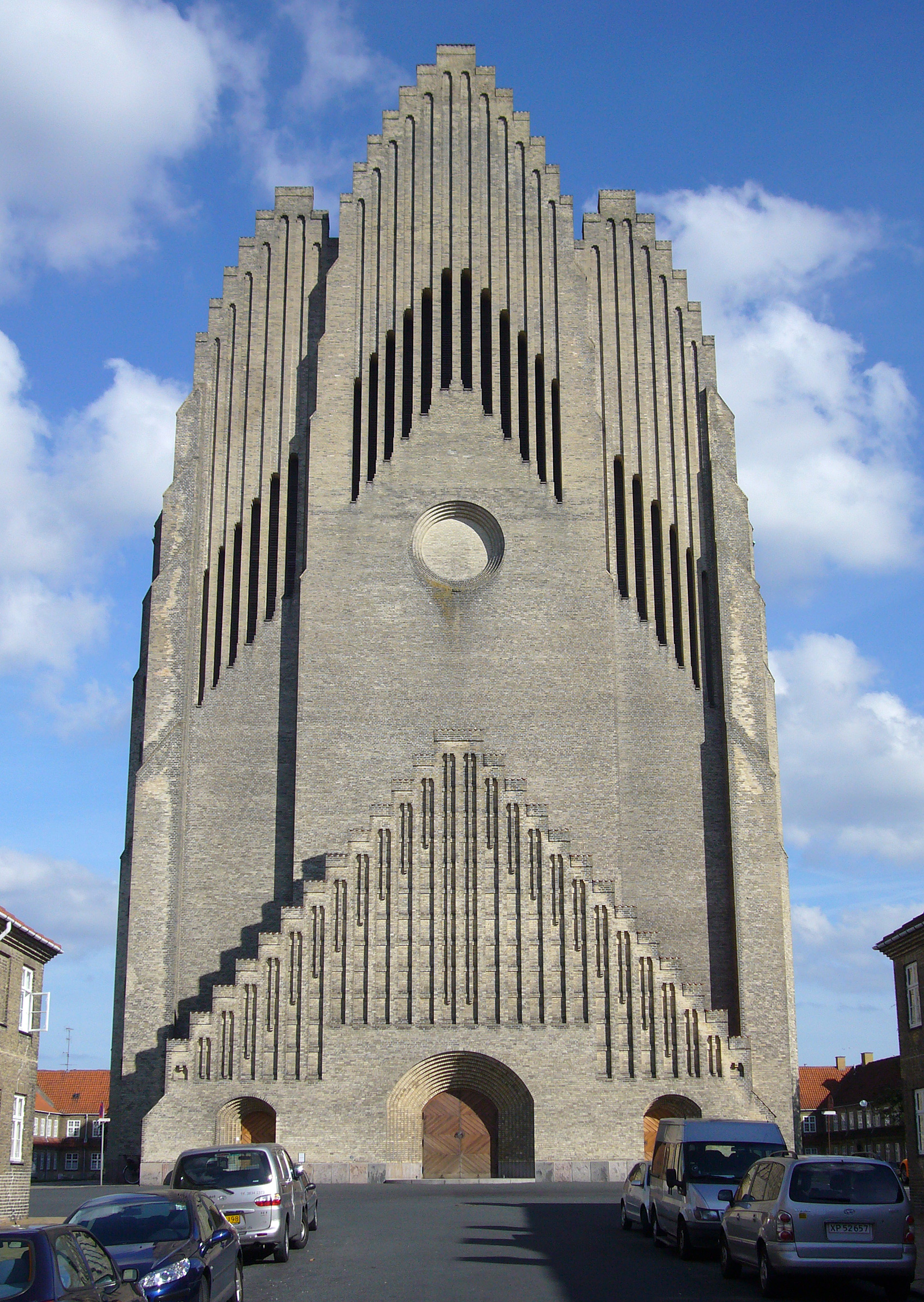
Grundtvig's Church, Copenhagen. Brick is a widely used building material in Danish architecture.

The architecture of Denmark has changed and evolved since prehistoric times, but the oldest buildings to have survived the ravages of time dates to the early Middle Ages when bricks was introduced as building material around 1150 AD and the first Romanesque, then Gothic churches and cathedrals sprang up across the country. Brick is still a locally produced, affordable, durable and widely used building material in today's architecture of Denmark. Inspired by French castles and with the assistance of Dutch designers, architecture during the Renaissance flourished with magnificent royal palaces. Neoclassicism came to Denmark from France and, in the 19th century, slowly merged into the National Romantic style when Danish designers came into their own. It was, however, not until the last half of the 20th century that Danish architects entered the world scene with their highly successful Functionalism. This, in turn, has evolved into more recent world-class designers such as Johann Otto von Spreckelsen who designed the Grande Arche in Paris. Internationally, perhaps the most celebrated of all is the architect who designed the iconic Sydney Opera House, Jørn Utzon, but within Danish borders, it is the architect Arne Jacobsen who is perhaps held in highest esteem for developing the 'Danish Modern' style and furniture/interior design, such as the now world-famous and much sought-after Swan and Egg chairs. A new wave of young Danish architects are rising into international prominence, like Bjarke Ingels with works such as the Danish National Pavilion at the Shanghai 2010 Expo.

=== Photography ===
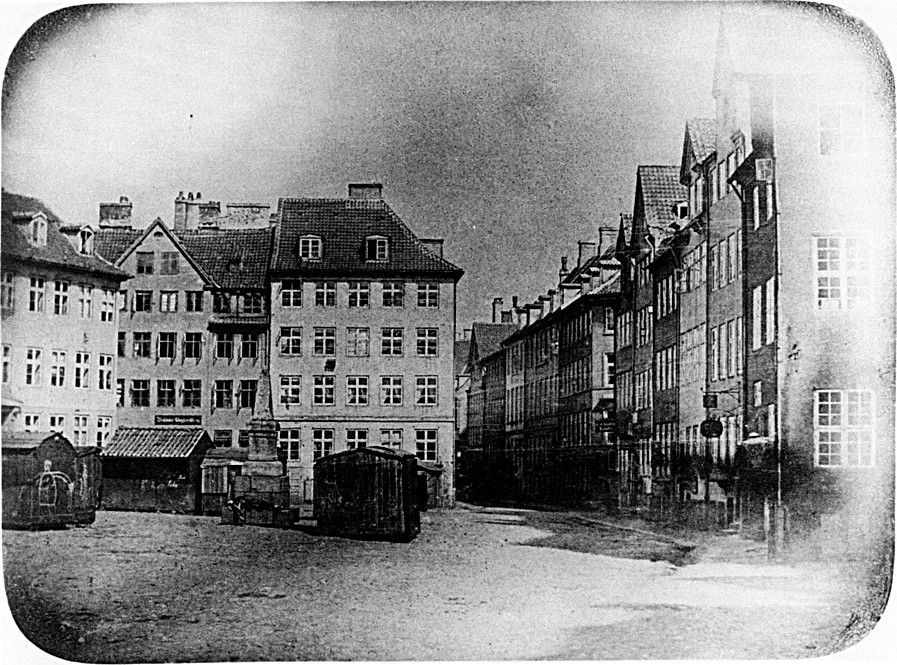
Peter Faber: Ulfeldts Plads, Copenhagen (1840). Denmark's oldest photograph.

Photography in Denmark has developed from strong participation and interest in the very beginnings of the art in 1839 to some of the strongest contemporary photography in Europe today. Pioneers such as Mads Alstrup and Georg Emil Hansen paved the way for a rapidly growing profession during the last half of the 19th century while both artistic and press photographers have since made internationally recognised contributions. Today Danish photographers such as Astrid Kruse Jensen and Jacob Aue Sobol are active both at home and abroad, participating in key exhibitions around the world.

=== Design ===
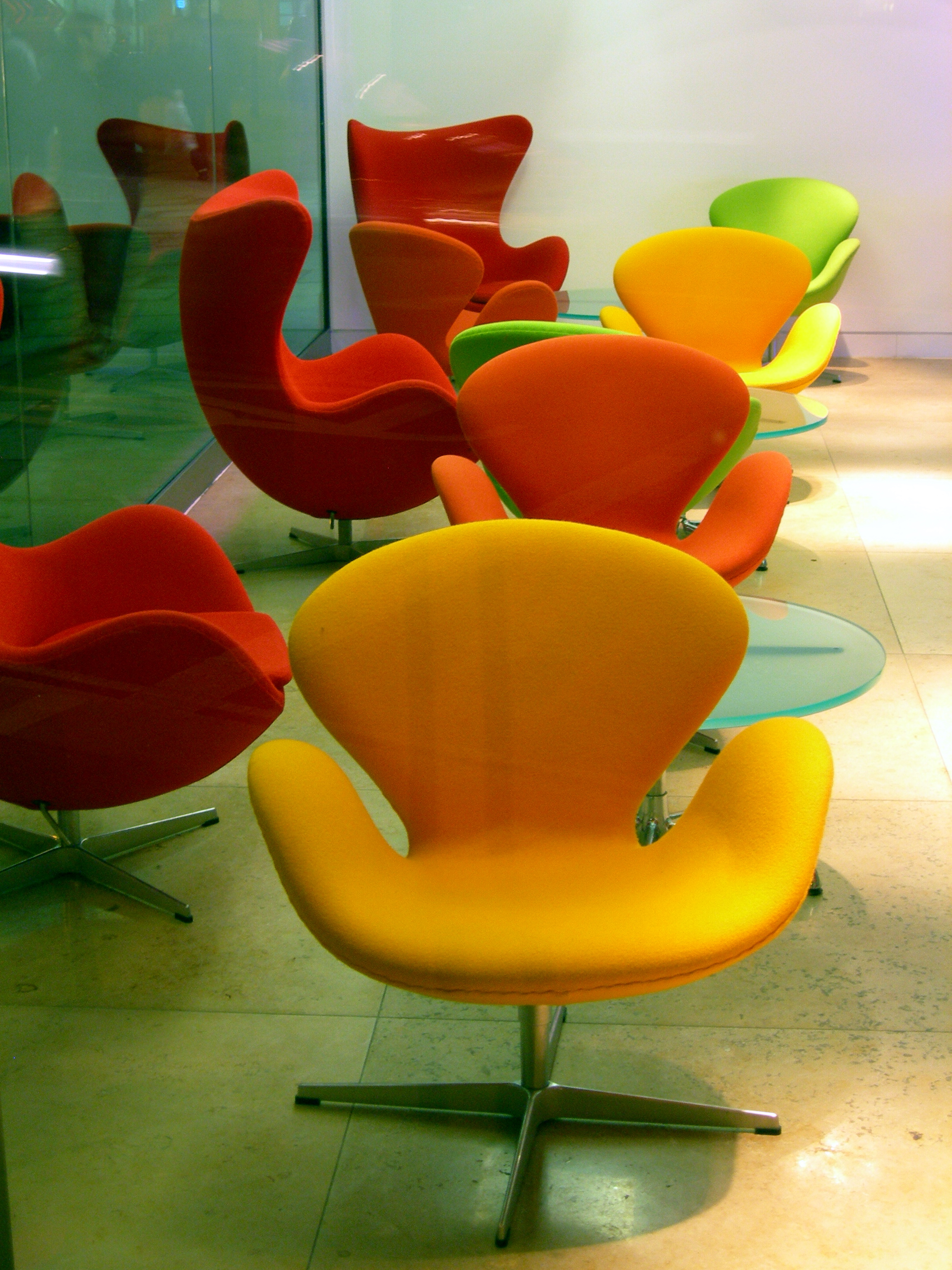
Arne Jacobsen's The Swan and the Egg

Danish design is a term often used to describe a style of functionalistic design and architecture that was developed in mid-20th century, originating in Denmark. Danish design is typically applied to industrial design, furniture and household objects, which have won many international awards.

The Danish Porcelain Factory ("Royal Copenhagen"), including Bing & Grøndahl, is famous for the quality of its ceramics and export products worldwide. Danish design is also a well-known brand, often associated with world-famous designers and architects such as Børge Mogensen (1914–1972), Finn Juhl (1912–1989), Hans Wegner (1914–2007), Arne Jacobsen (1902–1971), Poul Kjærholm (1929–1980), Poul Henningsen (1894–1967) and Verner Panton (1926–1998). Georg Jensen (1866–1935) is known the world over for modern design in silver.

Other designers of note include Kristian Solmer Vedel (1923–2003) in the area of industrial design, Jens Harald Quistgaard (1919–2008) for kitchen furniture and implements and Ole Wanscher (1903–1985) who had a classical approach to furniture design.

The Danish Museum of Art & Design in Copenhagen exhibits the best in Danish design.

== Performing arts ==
=== Music ===
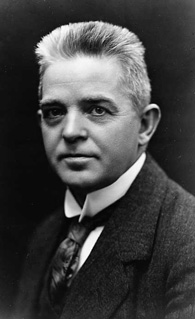
Carl Nielsen (1865–1931)

Denmark's most famous composer of classical music is Carl Nielsen who is best known outside of Denmark for his six symphonies, but whose melodies for popular songs are cherished among Danes. Other well-known pieces of his are the incidental music for Adam Oehlenschläger's drama Aladdin (Nielsen), the operas Saul og David and Maskarade, the concertos for flute, violin, and clarinet, the Wind Quintet, and the Helios Overture, which depicts the passage of the sun in the sky from dawn to nightfall. The Royal Danish Ballet specializes in the work of Danish choreographer August Bournonville (1805–79). Hans Abrahamsen, Per Nørgård and Poul Ruders are successful composers of contemporary classical music. Danish interest in classical music is exemplified by the prestigious Opera House completed in 2000. Strategically set on Copenhagen's waterfront, it has presented operas and musicals to full houses ever since its opening.

Danes have also distinguished themselves in rhythmical music, with world-famous jazz musicians such as Svend Asmussen, Niels-Henning Ørsted Pedersen, Niels Lan Doky and Marilyn Mazur. The Copenhagen Jazz Festival has acquired an international reputation.

The modern pop and rock scene has produced some bands of note like Aqua, Dizzy Mizz Lizzy, D-A-D, The Raveonettes, Michael Learns to Rock, Alphabeat, Medina, Oh Land, Kashmir, Mew, Outlandish and Dúné. All together, Lars Ulrich, drummer of the band Metallica, has become the first Danish musician to be inducted into the Rock and Roll Hall of Fame.

=== Cinema ===
In recent years, Danish films have gained increasing recognition at home and abroad. Gabriel Axel's film based on Karen Blixen's Babette's Feast was awarded an Oscar in 1987. In 1988, Bille August also received an Oscar with Pelle the Conqueror based on the novel by Martin Andersen Nexø. In 1992, August went on to win the Palme d'Or in Cannes with Ingmar Bergman's autobiography, The Best Intentions.

Since the late 1990s, the Dogme movement and figures such as Lars von Trier, Thomas Vinterberg, Søren Kragh-Jacobsen and Lone Scherfig have continued to contribute to the international success of Danish cinema. In 2011, Susanne Bier's In a Better World won the Academy Award for Best Foreign Language Film.

=== Theatre ===
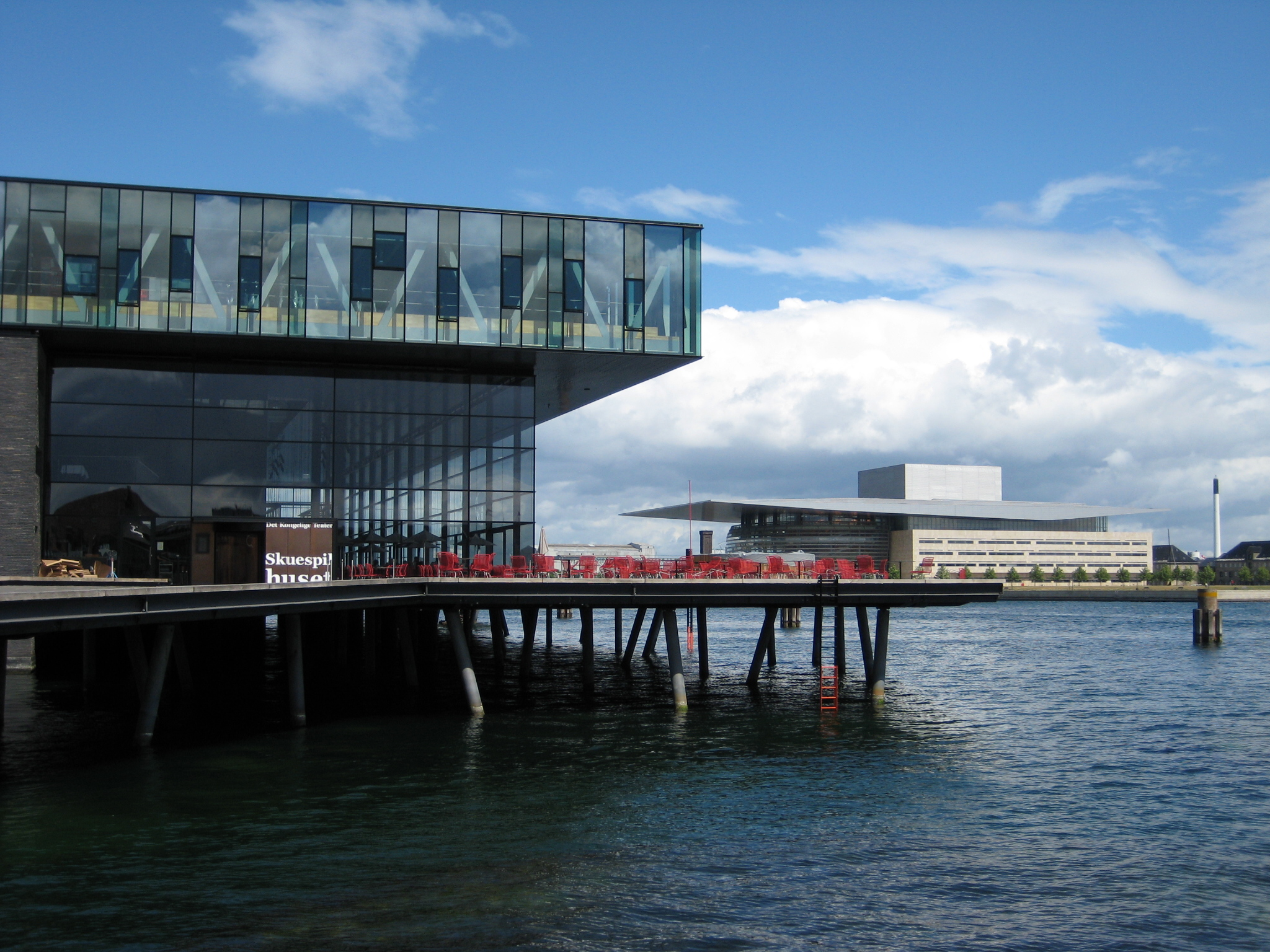
Royal Playhouse (left) and Copenhagen Opera House (background, right)

The theatre in Denmark continues to thrive thanks to the many theatres across the country which put on a wide variety of Danish and foreign performances. The flagship Royal Danish Theatre presents drama, opera, ballet and music. Since the 18th century, Danish playwrights have been successful in attracting wide public interest.

Ludvig Holberg (1684–1754) is considered by many to be the founder of the Danish theatre. Satirical comedies such as Jean de France and Jeppe of the Hill are still performed today.

Adam Oehlenschläger (1779–1850) introduced romanticism to the Danish theatre. Especially successful was his Earl Hakon the Mighty, premiered in 1808.

The Norwegian Henrik Ibsen (1828–1906) also travelled to Copenhagen where he produced numerous plays such as A Doll's House (1879).

In recent years, there has been something of a revival in Danish theatre. Many new playwrights and producers have appeared including Astrid Saalbach (born 1955), winner of the Nordic Drama Award in 2004, and Peter Asmussen (born 1957), who wrote the film script for Lars von Trier's Breaking the Waves. Danish musicals have also been a particularly successful feature of the modern theatre. Knud Christensen, commonly known as Sebastian, was particularly successful with Cyrano (1992), based on Rostand's play and Klokkeren fra Notre Dame (The Hunchback of Notre Dame) (2001). Bent Fabricius-Bjerre's musical Matador (2007) is based on a successful TV series of the same name.

Another popular Danish theatrical tradition is the revue which has been thriving since the mid-19th century. Today revues are performed every summer to full houses in theatres across Denmark, poking fun at the politics of the day and even the monarchy. Among the most popular are Circusrevyen in Copenhagen with Lisbet Dahl, and the Nykøbing Revy directed by Flemming Krøll in Nykøbing Falster.

To this day, Denmark also has a large tradition for children and youth theater, as it hosts the largest annual children and youth theater event in the world, Aprilfestivallen, every year.

=== Television ===
Danish television has also contributed to drama with a number of successful series since the 1970s. Perhaps the most notable domestic and international successes have been the political drama Borgen and the three series of Forbrydelsen (The Killing, 2007–2012). Forbrydelsen attracted more than a 30% audience share, when originally broadcast in Denmark and both series have been widely sold around the world.

== Science ==
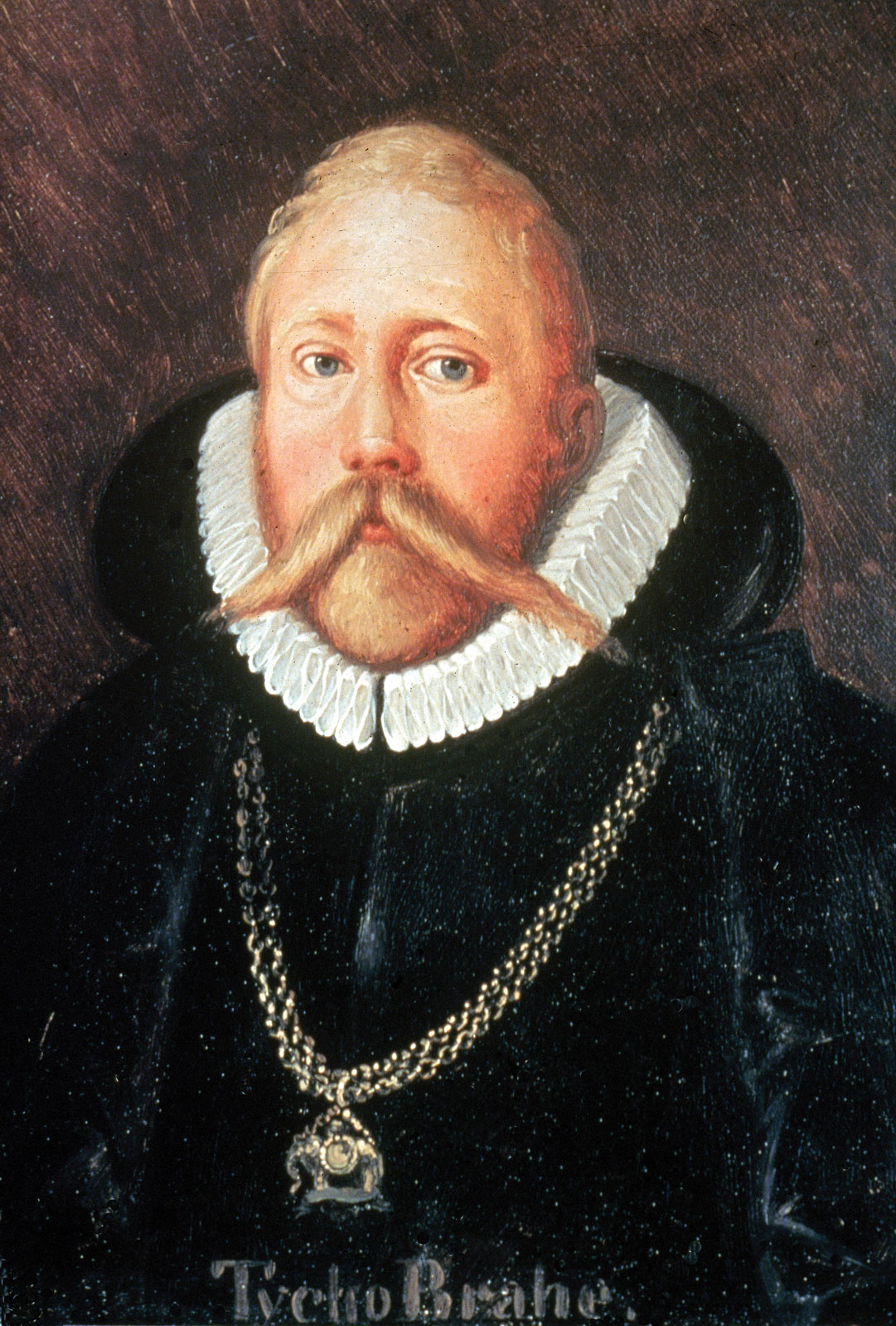
Tycho Brahe was well known in his lifetime as an astronomer, astrologer and alchemist, and has been described more recently as "the first competent mind in modern astronomy to feel ardently the passion for exact empirical facts."

Denmark has a long tradition for scientific engagement in all fields, often with fundamental discoveries. The intelligentsia was involved in the European Scientific Revolution of the renaissance early on, with prominent scientists such as Tycho Brahe (1546–1601), Ole Worm (1588–1655), Nicolas Steno (1638–1686) and Ole Rømer (1644–1710).

The contributions to science has steadily continued through the ages, with the fundamental discoveries of Hans Christian Ørsted (1777–1851), the contributions to linguistics by Rasmus Rask (1787–1832), the neglected articulation of the principle of conservation of energy by Ludwig A. Colding's (1815–1888), Vilhelm Thomsen (1842–1927), Otto Jespersen (1860–1943) and others, into modern times with the brilliant contributions to atomic physics of Niels Bohr (1885–1962).

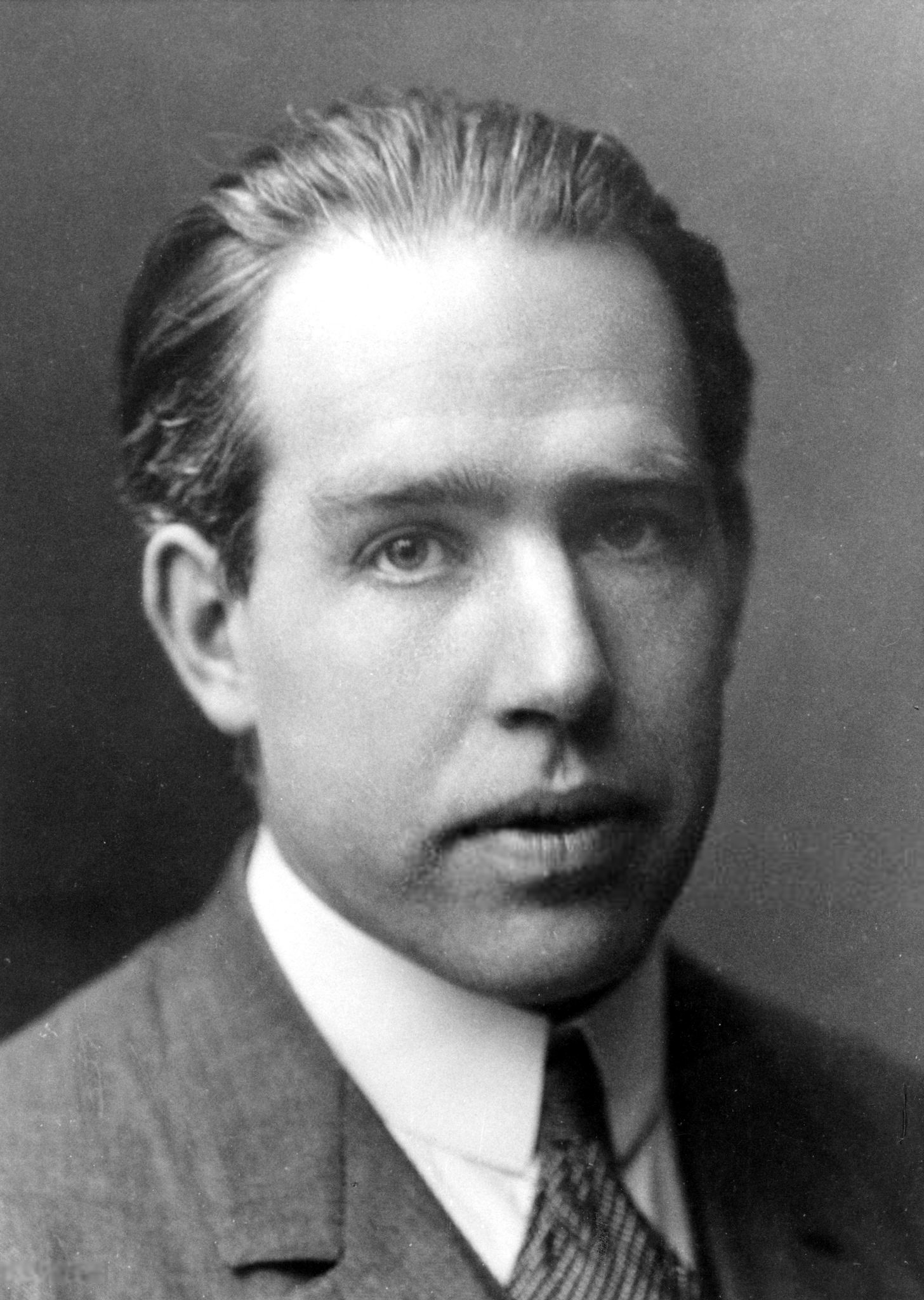
Niels Bohr was a renowned Danish physicist, specializing in atomic and quantum physics. He has been described as one of the most influential scientists of the 20th century. He was also involved in the Manhattan Project.

Niels Bohr founded several institutions in relation to quantum physics and both attracted and stimulated an important international and lasting scientific milieu in the country. This has since produced many important discoveries and advancements in physics, astrophysics, chemistry, mathematics and engineering, particularly in the areas of quantum physics, quantum optics and lately nano-technology. Although an international environment, notable Danish scientists from this milieu includes Bengt Strömgren (1908–1987), Aage Bohr (1922–2009), Holger Bech Nielsen (born 1941) and Lene Vestergaard Hau (born 1959).

The sciences of geology and geophysics has benefited from Danish scientists who have been - and are - heavily involved in the description and understanding of the geology of Greenland, one of the most important regions in the world to study the geological evolution of Earth. The Geological Survey of Denmark and Greenland (GEUS) was founded in 1888 and Inge Lehmann (1888–1993) revealed that Earth have a solid inner core in 1936, by the use of seismology. In the 1960s, Willi Dansgaard was the first to understand and describe how to use ice core drills to gain knowledge about Earth's paleoclimate, now a widely used method to understand climate changes. Lately, Greenland-born geologist Minik Rosing and his team, unravelled groundbreaking knowledge about the early evolution of life through studies of Greenland's geology in the 2000s.

Danish scholars have made foundational contributions to the field of archaeology. In the 19th century, Christian Jürgensen Thomsen developed the three-age system, dividing prehistory into the Stone Age, Bronze Age, and Iron Age. Subsequent Danish archaeologists, including Sophus Müller, Georg F.L. Sarauw, Jens Jacob Asmussen Worsaae, and Peter Glob, advanced archaeological methods through the study of kitchen middens and bog bodies.

Danish research defined several key prehistoric cultures of the Nordic region, including the Maglemosian, Kongemose, and Ertebølle cultures, as well as developments in Viking Age archaeology. Through interdisciplinary collaboration with fields such as anthropology, geology, and botany, Danish archaeologists have conducted field research internationally, including in the Middle East, the Mediterranean region, the Americas, and the Arctic.

Danes have made significant contributions to the field of computer science. Some notable figures include: Per Brinch Hansen, known for concurrent programming theory; Bjarne Stroustrup, who invented the C++ programming language; Janus Friis, the co-inventor of Skype; Jens and Lars Rasmussen, the co-founders of Google Maps; and Peter Naur, a contributor to ALGOL 60 and a recipient of the Turing Award.

== LGBT ==
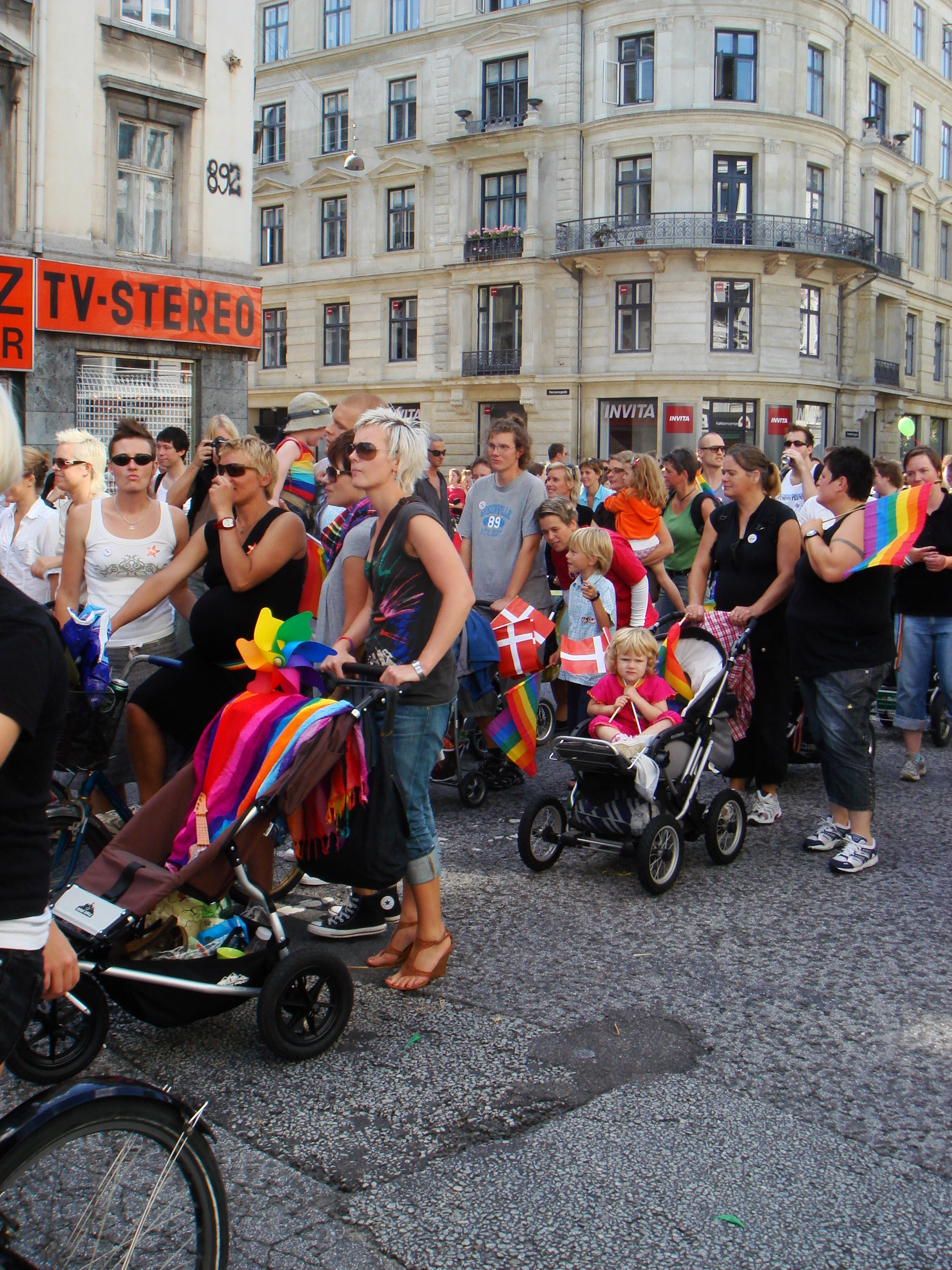
Copenhagen gay pride parade, 2008

Social equality, including sexual equality, is relatively high in modern Denmark. Danes are somewhat tolerant towards sexual minorities.

Public displays of affection between gay partners are less likely to provoke disapproval, even as compared to other liberal Western countries. As such, Copenhagen is a popular destination for homosexual and bisexual travellers. The main gay and lesbian festivals of the year are the Copenhagen Pride Parade and the Gay & Lesbian Film Festival. Copenhagen has been host to the 2009 World Outgames.

In 1989 Denmark became the first country in the world to offer same-sex couples most of the same legal rights as heterosexual couples, in the form of "registered partnerships.". In March 2009 adoption was legalized for same-sex couples. Same-sex marriage became legal in 2012, after both the parliament and the Church of Denmark voted for it.

== See also ==
- Law of Jante
- Scandinavia
- Danish Golden Age
- List of libraries in Denmark
- List of museums in Denmark
- List of World Heritage Sites in Northern Europe (including Denmark)
- Culture of the Faroe Islands
- Danish Culture Canon
