= Holger Gilbert-Jespersen =

Danish musician (1890–1975)

- Born: 22 September 1890; Ordrup, Denmark
- Died: 30 July 1975 (aged 84); Vig Lyng, Holbæk Municipality, Denmark
- Occupations: Flutist; Academic teacher
- Years active: 1917–1962
- Organizations: Royal Danish Orchestra; Royal Danish Academy of Music

Holger Gilbert-Jespersen (22 September 1890 – 30 July 1975) was a Danish flutist, orchestral musician and academic flute teacher. In 1926, Carl Nielsen's Flute Concerto was written for, dedicated to, and first performed by Gilbert-Jespersen in Paris. He was a member of the Royal Danish Orchestra from 1927 to 1956 as well as a professor at the Royal Danish Academy of Music from 1927 to 1962, where he trained generations of flutists.

== Biography ==
Holger Gilbert-Jespersen was born on 22 September 1890 in Ordrup, Denmark, the son of the physician Gilbert Lauri Jespersen (1851–1929) and the artist Anne Marie Schack Bruun (1849–1925). Gilbert-Jespersen studied the flute from 1908 to 1911 at the Royal Danish Academy of Music. His primary instructor was Frederik Storm of the Royal Danish Orchestra. After a few years of employment in a casino orchestra he went to London, where he studied with Albert Fransella. From 1913 to 1914, Gilbert-Jespersen was in Paris, studying flute with Adolphe Hennebains, the principal flute of the Grand Opéra in Paris, and was employed occasionally in the opera orchestra. When World War I broke out in 1914, he returned to Denmark to enter the security force.

== Career ==
In 1917 Gilbert-Jespersen started working as part of the Tivoli Concert Hall Orchestra and the Palace orchestra. In 1922, he made his debut as a member of the Copenhagen Wind Quintet performing Carl Nielsen's Wind Quintet. Nielsen was so taken with their performance that he began to compose a solo concerto for each member of the quintet.

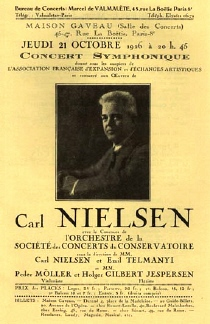
Front page of the program for the premiere of Nielsen's Flute Concerto on 21 October 1926 in Paris

Gilbert-Jespersen soon returned to Paris to study flute with Philippe Gaubert, the conductor of the Grand Opéra. Nielsen wrote his Flute Concerto for him and dedicated it to him. Gilbert-Jespersen played the first performance in Paris in 1926. His playing was characterized as delicate and light, inspired by the French style of his instructors. Nielsen's health began to deteriorate, so only one more of the proposed solos for the members of the Copenhagen Wind Quintet was finished: the Clarinet Concerto for Aage Oxenvad, which was completed in 1928.

From 1927 to 1956, Gilbert-Jespersen was a member of the Royal Danish Orchestra, a soloist in the wind quintet from 1929, and played in the Danish Quartet from 1935. Simultaneously, Gilbert-Jespersen was a professor at the Royal Danish Academy of Music from 1927 to 1962, where he trained legions of Danish flutists, including Johan Bentzon, Poul Birkelund, Franz Lemsser, and Erik Thomsen.

During his career, he received many honors. He was awarded the Carl Nielsen Prize in 1954, the Danish Gramophone Record Prize in 1955, the Cultural Foundation's Honorary Award in 1958, the Schytte's Honorary Award in 1960, and the Vera and Carl Johan Michaelsen's Honorary Award in 1960.

== Personal life ==
Gilbert-Jespersen was married for the first time on 15 May 1922, to the milliner and textile designer Birte Elise Borgen Petersen (9 May 1902 – 14 September 1987), but they were divorced in 1927. Three years later, on 8 November 1930 in Copenhagen, he married Ellinor Agnete Engman (30 April 1909– 3? January 1994 (found murdered)). The marriage was dissolved 1941. His third wife was a nurse, Katherine Marie "Misse" Richter (18 September 1908 – 9 August 1958), whom he married on 7 May 1948 in Copenhagen.

He died on 30 July 1975 in Vig Lyng, Holbæk Municipality, and was buried at Vig Cemetery.

== Discography ==
- 1936 Carl Nielsen: Wind Quintet, with Royal Orchestra Wind Quintet (Clarinet Classics – CC 0002)
- 1954 Carl Nielsen: Fløjtekoncert, with Radiosymfoniorkestret and Thomas Jensen (Dutton Laboratories – CDLXT2505)
