= Ulla Miilmann =

Danish flutist

Ulla Miimann is a Danish flutist. She is principal flutist of the National Danish Radio Symphony Orchestra and an associate professor of flute at the Royal Danish Academy of Music.

In 1994 Miilmann was appointed principal flutist at The Danish National Symphony Orchestra at the age of 22. Since then she has had an extensive career in orchestra and chamber music as well as in teaching. In 2007 she was a US Grammy nominee in the category ”Best instrumental Soloist Performance with Orchestra” for the recording of Ole Schmidt’s Flute Concerto. Since 2009 she has been part of the flute faculty at The Royal Danish Academy of Music in Copenhagen. In 2021 she was appointed associate professor of flute at the institution. Mrs. Miilmann has received the Jacob Gade Honorary Award, the Danish Music Critic’s Prize and the Peter Warming Memorial Prize, the latter awarded for her artistic contribution to the Danish National Symphony Orchestra greatly helping the orchestra to reach the high international standard of today. In 2017 she received the largest honorary award in Denmark, The Carl Nielsen Award for her outstanding musicianship and contribution to the Danish music and cultural life for the past 25 years.

In 2023, she recorded the Nielsen flute concerto for Deutsche Grammophone, which won the BBC Music Magazine “Best Concerto Album of the Year”

== Biography ==
Miilmann was brought up in Vemmedrup near Køge in the south of Zealand. Her interest in the flute started at the age of eight when she the saw instrument being played on a television programme. Two years later, her parents gave her a flute for her birthday. When they saw how interested she had become in playing it, they arranged for her to have music lessons in Hillerød, driving her there every Saturday. Her parents' interest in her progress encouraged her, motivating her to practice for several hours a day. She progressed quickly, winning the Berlingske Music Competition in 1988 and playing as a soloist with the Copenhagen Philharmonic in 1990.

In the 1980s, it became fashionable for teenagers to go to America as exchange students. Miilmann received a place at the School of the Arts in North Carolina. She quickly adapted to the school's intensive curriculum, practising every day from 5 a.m., then following classes until late in the afternoon. She remained at the school until she was 20, successfully completing her education with a bachelor's degree in 1992.

The years she had spent there had however been quite a strain. As a result, when she returned to Denmark at the age of 20, she took on a job as a postman. But when she saw an advertisement for a post with the Royal Danish Orchestra, she immediately started to practise again, gaining admission when she was just 21. The following year, she became solo flautist with the Danish National Symphony Orchestra attached to Danmarks Radio, a position she still holds today.

Miilmann also plays in the Danish Radio Woodwind Quintet which she helped to establish in 1999. She has appeared as a soloist with all the major orchestras in Denmark and has played with other notable soloists including the pianist Katrine Gislinge and the violinist Gidon Kremer. In 2002, she appeared with the Philharmonia Moment Musical at a Danish music event in Taipei.

In February 2006, Miilmann received a Grammy nomination for "Best Soloist Performance with Orchestra" for her recording of Ole Schmidt's Concerto for Flute and Orchestra. Although she did not win the award, the nomination and her treatment at the event in Los Angeles encouraged her to stick to playing the flute at a time when she had been considering moving into another profession.

In January 2014, Miilmann was the soloist in Carl Nielsen's Flute Concerto which she first played when she was about 13 years old. "It's only over the past four or five years that I have really begun to understand it... The older I get, the more I am ready to follow my inner feelings, even though they may not be in line with the accepted traditions. In this way, for the first time I can see I am beginning to understand Carl Nielsen's Flute Concerto."
