= Katrine Gislinge =

Danish pianist

Katrine Gislinge (born 1969) is a Danish pianist.

She began taking piano lessons at the age of six. After taking her diploma in 1990 at the Royal Danish Academy of Music in Copenhagen, she studied with, among others, Seymour Lipkin in New York City, Boris Berman at Yale, and Peter Feuchtwanger in London.

In recent years, Gislinge has embarked upon endeavours including chamber music collaborations with international musicians such as violinist Gidon Kremer, the German Petersen String Quartet, the cellist Jian Wang, cellist Marc Coppey, the flautist Emmanuel Pahud, the violinist Augustin Dumay and the violist Gérard Caussé, and solo concerts at international festivals, such as the Festival Internacional Cervantino in Mexico, Festival de Radio France et Montpellier and Lockenhaus Chamber Music Festival, soloist performances conducted by among others Eri Klas, Hiroyuki Iwaki, Michael Schønwandt, Okko Kamu, Heinrich Schiff, Kurt Sanderling, Ádám Fischer, Sylvain Cambreling and Gustavo Dudamel.

In 1999 Katrine Gislinge recorded the cd "piano works" on Deutsche Grammophon, being the first Danish pianist to record on this label. Katrine Gislinge is known for work in the classic repertoire, including all concertos by Mozart and Beethoven, but she is also a romantic pianist, playing the concerts by Schumann, Chopin and Tchaikovsky.

Katrine Gislinge has been a jury member at international piano competitions, - in 2006 and 2008 at the Tivoli International Piano Competition.

She has appeared on several TV shows and movies, e.g., the Danish TV-program Smagsdommerne.

== Awards and recognitions ==
- Gold medal, Berlingske Tidende Music Competition,
- The Gade Prize,
- The Hafnia Prize (w. Trio Amando),
- The Simon Spies Honorary Award,
- Noilly Prat Prize,
- van Hauen's Music Award,
- Walther Schröders Piano Prize,
- Music Rewievers Society Award,
- Merete & Helge Finsen Honorary Award

== Repertoire ==
Haydn Concerto in D major

Mozart All concertos

Beethoven No. 1 in C major No. 2 in B flat major No. 4 in G major No. 5 in E♭ major Triple concerto in C major

Kuhlau Concerto in C major

Weber Konzertstück in F minor

Schumann Concerto in A minor

Grieg Concerto in A minor

Chopin Concertos

Bartók Concerto no. 3

Shostakovich Concerto for piano, trumpet and strings

Tschaikowski Concerto no. 1

Sergei Rachmaninoff Rhapsody on a Theme of Paganini

Britten Concerto for piano and strings

Manuel de Falla Concerto for piano (cembalo), fl., ob., cl., vn. and vc.

Repertoire piano solo:

J. C. Bach Sonatas

J. S. Bach Toccata in C minor Preludes/fuges Concerto in Italian style

Haydn All Sonatas

Mozart All sonatas

Beethoven Bagatelles Op. 33 Sonata no. 8 in C minor “Pathétique” Sonata no. 14 Op. 27 no. 2 in C sharp minor “Moonlight” Sonata no. 15 Op. 28 in D major “Pastorale” Sonata no. 23 Op. 57 in F minor op. 57 “Appassionata”

Schubert Sonata in A minor Sonata nr. 23 in B flat major D960 4 Impromptus Op. 90 D899

Schumann Kinderszenen Op. 15 Arabesque Op. 18 Kreisleriana Op. 16 Sonate no. 2 in G minor Op. 22 Carnaval Op. 9

Mendelssohn Lieder ohne Worte

Chopin Fantaisie in F minor Op. 49 Fantaisie-Impromptu Op. 66 Ballade in G minor Ballade in A flat major Ballade in F major Scherzo in B minor Scherzo in B flat minor Polonaises Mazurkas Valses Nocturnes Etudes

Brahms Klavierstücke Op. 119 2 Rhapsodies Op. 79

Mussorgsky Pictures at an Exhibition

Grieg Norwegian Dances Op. 72 Ballade in G minor Op. 24

Debussy Images Book I L’Ile joyeuse

Janacêk Sonate I.X.1905 “In the mist”

Manuel de Falla Fantasía Baética

Bartók Danses populaires roumaines

Erkki Melartin Der traurige Garten

David Monrad Johansen Nordlandsbilleder

Danish composers: N. W. Gade (1817–1890) Aquarelles

Carl Nielsen (1865–1931) Three Piano Pieces Op. 59 Five Piano Pieces Op. 3 Chaconne

Tage Nielsen (born 1929) Two Nocturnes

Per Nørgaard (born 1932) “Turn”

Erik Nordby (born 1936) 'Passacaglia'

A Nordentoft (born 1956) 'Behind'

P.E. Lange-Müller Dæmpede melodier

Thomas Blachman Star Music Opus 1

Christian Skeel Klavermusik
