= Hafnia Chamber Orchestra =

The Hafnia Chamber Orchestra is a string orchestra from Copenhagen, Denmark.

The ensemble was formed by young musicians from different international professional orchestras as well as talented students from the Soloist Class at the Royal Danish Academy of Music in Copenhagen.

The ensemble focuses on a varied repertoire for string orchestra, ranging from baroque to contemporary.

The orchestra toured Vietnam in November 2007 and Israel and the Palestinian Territories in February 2008.
