= Paul Chiang =

Paul Chiang may refer to:

- Paul Chiang (conductor), Taiwanese conductor
- Paul Chiang (politician) (born 1960), Canadian politician
- Paul Chun (born 1945), Hong Kong actor
