= Pelle Gudmundsen-Holmgreen =

Danish composer

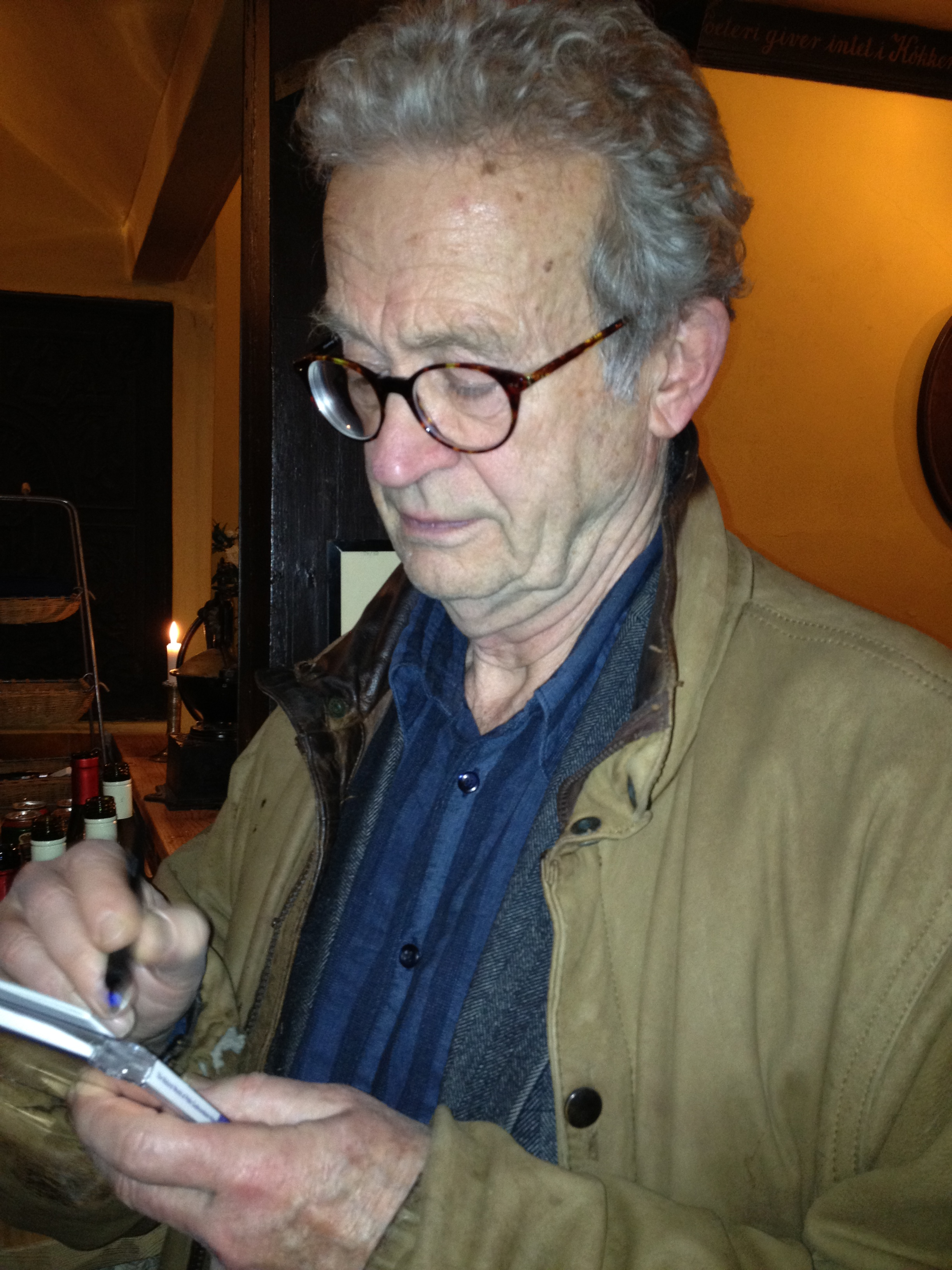
Pelle Gudmundsen-Holmgreen (2012)

Pelle Gudmundsen-Holmgreen (21 November 1932 – 27 June 2016) was a Danish composer.

== Biography ==
Pelle Gudmundsen-Holmgreen was born in Copenhagen, Denmark, and was the son of the sculptor Jørgen Gudmundsen-Holmgreen. He studied at the Royal Danish Academy of Music in Copenhagen, with Finn Høffding, Svend Westergaard, Bjørn Hjelmborg, and Vagn Holmboe (instrumentation), graduating in 1958.

Amongst other works, he composed fourteen string quartets and a Concerto Grosso for string quartet and orchestra, written for the Kronos Quartet, which he referred to as "Vivaldi on Safari."

He won the Nordic Council Music Prize in 1980 for his Symfoni/Antifoni.

Gudmundsen-Holmgreen died of cancer on 26 June 2016.

== Sources ==
- Cornelius, Jens. 2016. "Nekrolog: En stor original i dansk musik er død". DR.dk (28 June) (accessed 29 June 2016).
- Lohse, Gregers. 2016. "Stor dansk komponist er død af kræft". DR.dk (28 June) (accessed 29 June 2016).
- Wright, Katy. 2016. "Pelle Gudmundsen-Holmgreen (21 November 1932 – 27 June 2016)" Rheingold.co.uk (28 June) (accessed 16 October 2019).
