= Royal Danish Academy =

Royal Danish Academy may refer to:

- The Royal Danish Academy of Music
- The Royal Danish Academy of Sciences and Letters
- The Royal Danish Academy of Fine Arts
