= Colding =

Colding can refer to any of the following Danish people:

- Aage Colding, Danish actor
- Henrik Colding-Jørgensen, contemporary Danish composer
- Ludwig A. Colding, Danish civil engineer and physicist
- Søren Colding, Danish football player
- Tobias Colding, Danish mathematician
