= Chaconne (Nielsen) =

Piano composition by Carl Nielsen

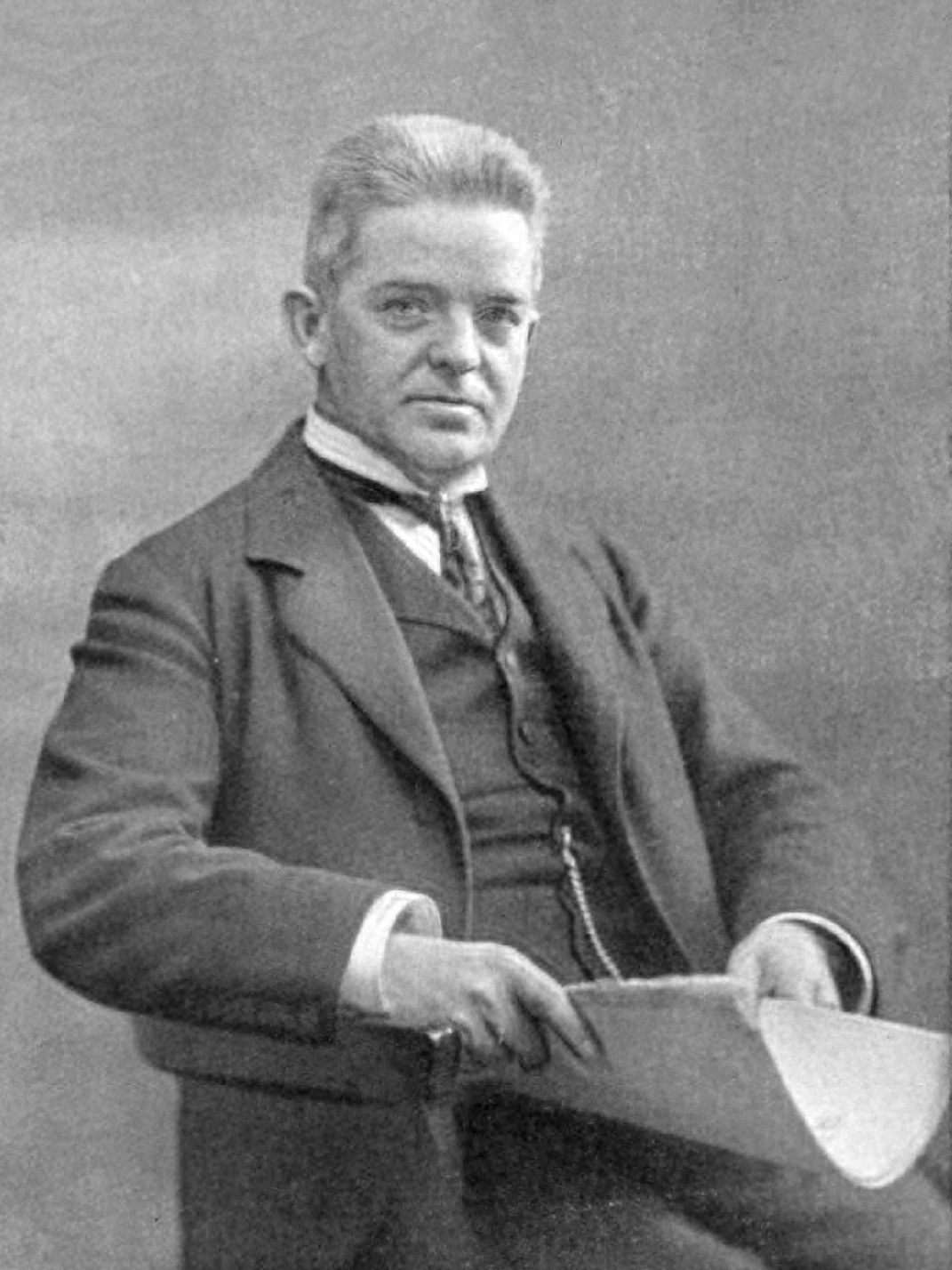
Carl Nielsen in 1917

Carl Nielsen's Chaconne, Op. 32, is among the composer's most frequently played compositions for piano.

== Background ==
In a letter to his daughter Irmelin dated 19 December 1916, Nielsen, who was spending Christmas alone because of difficulties in his marriage with Anne Marie, wrote that he was composing a large Chaconne for piano. "You probably know," he explained, "that the passacaglia and chaconne forms are more or less the same: a fundamental theme or bass that is varied in numerous ways." He hoped with his work for the piano would emulate Bach's beautiful Chaconne for solo violin. On 18 January 1917, he informed Irmelin that the work was finished, telling her he thought it was "a really big piece, and I think effective."

== Premiere and reception ==
The piece was premiered by Alexander Stoffregen on 13 April 1917 at a concert primarily devoted to Nielsen's songs. Nielsen considered this first performance "a great success". The reviews were generally positive. Vort Land spoke of "an interesting work, but one which needs to be heard several times before one can become completely familiar with its details." Axel Kjerulf in Politiken qualified it as "a fresh and characterful work" but Emilius Bangert, writing in Hovedstaten, found it "very heavy and rather stale, not least in its abstruse piano writing". The most enthusiastic praise came from Gustav Hetsch in Nationaltidende: "It held the audience’s attention the whole time with its many surprises, especially at the beginning, which we would like to have heard again in order to gain a better appreciation of the connections and details. Unfortunately, however, it was not the beginning but the much more easily assimilable conclusion that was repeated after the applause. This much is nevertheless clear: that Nielsen has here produced an interesting and original work in a new field for him."

On 11 February 1918, Christian Christiansen received an ovation when he played the piece during a concert of Nielsen's orchestral works. Charles Kjerulf described the work as "a genuine Carl Nielsen piano experiment... Everything is just calligraphy, lines, and curves, but it’s the most attractive, neatest, old-fashioned ornamentation."

== Music ==
The Chaconne, an extremely dynamic work, was Nielsen's first piano composition in 16 years. Following a simple opening theme, always in constant motion, the piece develops through a crescendo, finally winding down at the end. The 20 variations forming the composition's core have an extensive range, sometimes reflecting Bach's influence but more often presenting highly complex contrasts. The duration of the piece is approximately 9 minutes.
