= Valerie Pitts =

British television presenter (1937–2021)

Valerie Pitts, Lady Solti
- Valerie Pitts, Lady Solti - British TV presenter and arts patron
- Born: Ann Valerie Pitts; 19 August 1937; Leeds, England
- Died: 31 March 2021 (aged 83); London, England
- Occupations: presenter; philanthropist; actress
- Spouse(s): James Sargant (m. 1960; div. 1966) Georg Solti (m. 1967; died 1997)
- Children: 2

Ann Valerie, Lady Solti (née Pitts; 19 August 1937 – 31 March 2021) was a British television presenter, actress and arts journalist, patron and philanthropist, who was one of the BBC's original team of presenters during the 1950s. She left the programme in 1960 to marry James Sargant who was stage manager of the Sadler's Wells Opera Company (the precursor of the English National Opera). She also worked at Granada Television. She later married the Hungarian-British conductor Sir Georg Solti.

== Life and career ==
In 1961 Pitts appeared as a patient in the comedy film Dentist on the Job. She met Georg Solti in September 1964 when she interviewed him, fortuitously, as a last minute alternative to replace a missing news item. Solti pursued her romantically and finally persuaded her to leave her husband. They married on 11 November 1967, and had two daughters, Gabrielle and Claudia. She appeared on children's television, as a presenter of Play School and then at Granada a series for older children, ExtraOrdinary, which covered strange-but-true stories from science and the arts. She gave up her career as a presenter, though she continued to appear occasionally on television (such as on the quiz show, Face The Music) and worked with Solti for various charities.

Pitts was the patroness of the World Orchestra for Peace, which her husband founded and whose first concert at the United Nations he conducted. In addition, she has devoted time to other cultural organizations, including the Sadler's Wells Theatre Trust, the Mariinsky Theatre Trust, the Chicago Symphony Orchestra, Musica Nel Chiostro, Batignano Italy, the Hungarian Cultural Centre (London), Liszt Academy (Budapest), the Harrogate International Festivals as Vice Patron, and the W11 Opera children's opera company in London.

After Sir Georg Solti's death on 5 September 1997, Pitts and her two daughters began The Solti Foundation to assist young musicians. In 2002, a website dedicated to Georg Solti was launched, under the instigation of Lady Solti.

Lady Solti died at home in London in March 2021 at the age of 83.

== See also ==
- Petites Promenades (CSO Children's Concert Series)
- Sir Georg Solti International Conductors' Competition

== Archives ==
- Unpublished sound recordings (C1227) at the British National Archives
