= Shi-Yeon Sung =

South Korean classical conductor (born 1975)

- Born: 1975 (age 50–51); Busan
- Occupation: Classical conductor
- Employer: Gyeonggi Philharmonic Orchestra
- Known for: First woman to win first prize in the Sir Georg Solti International Conductors Competition

Korean name
- Hangul: 성시연
- RR: Seong Siyeon
- MR: Sŏng Siyŏn

Shi-Yeon Sung (born 1975, in Busan) is a South Korean classical conductor. In 2006, she became the first woman to win first prize in the Sir Georg Solti International Conductors' Competition. In 2007, she won second prize in Bamberg's Gustav Mahler Conducting Competition (no first prize was given that year). That year, she became the first female assistant conductor of the Boston Symphony Orchestra, a post she held through 2010. Among the orchestras she has conducted are the Los Angeles Philharmonic, Royal Stockholm Philharmonic Orchestra, Swedish Radio Symphony Orchestra and the National Symphony Orchestra of Washington, D.C. She was the associate conductor of the Seoul Philharmonic from 2009 to 2013. She served as the artistic director and chief conductor of Gyeonggi Philharmonic Orchestra from January 2014 until 2017. In 2022, she was appointed to the role of Principal Guest Conductor of the Auckland Philharmonia Orchestra.
