= Sir Georg Solti International Conductors' Competition =

German competition for conductors

Alte Oper

The Sir Georg Solti International Conductors' Competition was a German competition for conductors that took place biennially in Frankfurt, at the Alte Oper, from 2002 to 2020. The cooperating music organisations were the Frankfurter Opern- und Museumsorchester and the hr-Sinfonieorchester. The competition was founded in memory of Sir Georg Solti, who led the Frankfurt Opera during 1952–1961. The patroness of the competition for many years was Valerie, Lady Solti, who died in 2021, the widow of Sir Georg Solti. A Hungarian competition with the same name was held in 2026.

== Prize winners ==
Year	Edition	First Prize	Second Prize	Third Prize
2002	1	Not awarded	Tomáš Netopil (Czech Republic)	Paul Chiang (Taiwan); Ruben Gazarian (Armenia)
2004	2	James Gaffigan (United States); Ivo Venkov (Bulgaria)	Johannes Gustavsson (Sweden)	Not awarded
2006	3	Shi-Yeon Sung (Korea)	Shizuo Z Kuwahara (United States)	Matthew Coorey (Australia)
2008	4	Shizuo Z Kuwahara (United States)	Eugene Tzigane (United States)	Andreas Hotz (Germany)
2010	5	José Luís Gómez Ríos (Spain)	Kevin Griffiths (United Kingdom)	Tito Muñoz (United States)
2012	6	Daye Lin (China)	Daniel Smith (Australia)	Brandon Keith Brown (United States)
2015	7	Not awarded	Tung-Chieh Chuang (Taiwan) (Audience award); Elias Grandy (Germany)	Toby Thatcher (Australia)
2017	8	Valentin Uryupin (Russia) (Audience award)	Wilson Ng (Hong Kong)	Farkhad Khudyev (Turkmenistan)
2020	9	Tianyi Lu (New Zealand)	Gábor Hontvári (Hungary); Johannes Zahn (Germany) (Audience award)	Not awarded

== Prize money ==
As of 2020 the prize money was:

- 1st prize €15,000
- 2nd prize €10,000
- 3rd prize €5,000
- Audience award

The audience award was linked to the symbolic handover of an original conducting baton from Sir Georg Solti from his time in Frankfurt.

The winners of the first and second prizes were given the prospect of conducting the Frankfurt Opera and Museum Orchestra (concert and opera) and the Frankfurt Radio Symphony. Other orchestras held out the prospect of hosting guest conductors or assistance.

== Budapest Solti International Conducting Competition ==
=== 2026 ===
The Hungarian Solti International Conducting Competition launched 2026 in Budapest, organized by Müpa. It was held between 1 and 10 October 2026, under the new patronage of Ken-Ichiro Kobayashi, with the jury chaired by Pinchas Steinberg, currently chief conductor of the Budapest Philharmonic Orchestra. Other jury members included György Vashegyi, Anu Tali, Mikko Franck, and Roberto Abbado.

==== Recipients ====
- 1st Prize: Not awarded
- 2nd Prize: Drummado Wijnhamer
- 3rd Prize: Yu-Te Wu
