= Flute Concerto (Nielsen) =

Concerto by Carl Nielsen

- by Carl Nielsen
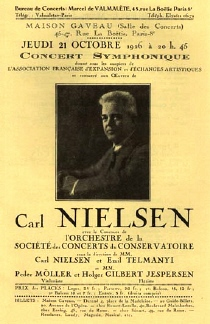
- Front page of the programme for the premiere on 21 October 1926 in Paris
- Catalogue: FS 119
- Dedication: Holger Gilbert-Jespersen
- Performed: 21 October 1926: Paris
- Scoring: flute; orchestra

Carl Nielsen's Concerto for Flute and Orchestra (FS 119) was written in 1926 for Holger Gilbert-Jespersen, who succeeded Paul Hagemann as flautist of the Copenhagen Wind Quintet. The concerto, in two movements, was generally well received at its premiere in Paris in October 1926 where Nielsen had introduced a temporary ending. The first complete version was played in Copenhagen the following January. The flute concerto has become part of the international repertoire.

== Background ==
In 1921, Nielsen heard the Copenhagen Wind Quintet rehearsing music by Mozart and was struck by the group's tonal beauty and musicianship. That same year, he wrote his Wind Quintet expressly for this ensemble. The last movement of the wind quintet is a theme and variations depicting in music the personalities of the five players and their respective instruments, much in the manner that Elgar portrayed his friends in the Enigma Variations. Promising he would write a concerto for each member of the quintet, he started with the flautist Holger Gilbert-Jespersen (1890-1975). As a result of poor health, he was only able to complete one more concerto before his death, the Clarinet Concerto, for the group's clarinetist, Aage Oxenvad, which he completed in 1928.

Nielsen began work on the flute concerto while travelling in Germany and Italy in August 1926, intending it to be performed in Paris at a concert devoted to four of his works on 21 October. Unfortunately, as a result of a prolonged stomach complaint, he did not complete the work in time and had to introduce a temporary ending for its Paris premiere.

== Reception ==
The work was positively received at its premiere in Paris at the Maison Gaveau on 21 October 1926, with the Orchestre de la Société des Concerts du Conservatoire and with his son-in-law, Emil Telmányi, conducting. Paul Le Flem wrote in Comoedia: "The Concerto for flute and orchestra, outstandingly performed by M. Holger-Gilbert Jespersen, is the most recent work by Mr Nielsen. It has piquancy, drive and does not lack humour." But Jan Meyerheim, writing in the Paris Telegram did not agree: "The Concerto for flute, well played by M. Jespersen, I did not care for at all; it was beyond my comprehension." Nielsen said that the premiere, with the performers completely dedicated to the work, was one of the "greatest experiences" of his life. Both Maurice Ravel and Arthur Honegger were reported to be in attendance, the latter being recorded as saying "the famous Conservatory Orchestra played great and the flute concerto was performed in a masterly manner and with a delicate tone - there was a standing ovation and soloist Gilbert Jespersen "flûtiste de grande classe" - was called in several times."

It was not until 25 January 1927 that the first complete version was performed at the Music Society in Copenhagen. The flute concerto has become part of the international Nielsen repertoire.

== Music ==
Besides its solo flute, the concerto is scored for two oboes, two clarinets, two bassoons, two horns, bass trombone, timpani and strings. An advance from the rather traditional style of Nielsen's Violin Concerto, it reflects the modernistic trends of the 1920s and lacks tonal stability. The work is generally neoclassical in style, but includes only two movements instead of three, as in classical concerto form.

1. Allegro moderato
2. Allegretto un poco – Adagio ma non troppo – Allegretto – Poco adagio – Tempo di marcia

The 11-minute Allegro moderato first movement varies between D minor, E♭ minor and F major. Solo passages, dialogues between solo flute and orchestra, and a clarinet and bassoon conversation characterize the music. After an unexpected bass trombone disruption, the flute comes to the fore with a cantabile theme in E major. An orchestral cadenza leads back into the opening themes before terminating calmly in a key approximating G♭ major. Much of the content of this movement resembles chamber music between the flute and various instruments.

Nielsen describes the opening of the 7-minute second movement as having "a little nastiness in some notes cast forth by the orchestra, but the atmosphere quickly relaxes again, and, when the solo flute enters, it does so with childish innocence." The movement's melodious start fluctuates between Allegretto and Adagio before settling into a Tempo di marcia variation on the melodic opening. The bass trombone introduces a final series of playful slides, bringing the work to an end.

== Sources ==
- Flute Concerto, FS 119: Scores at the International Music Score Library Project
