= Matthew Coorey =

Australian conductor

- Born: October 25, 1973 (age 52)
- Website: matthewcoorey.com

Matthew Coorey (born 25 October 1973) is an Australian conductor based in the United Kingdom.

He began his conducting career in 2002 when he took up the position of Junior Fellow (under Sir Mark Elder) at the Royal Northern College of Music. In the same year he was a finalist in the Maazel-Vilar Conducting Competition and later a prize-winner at the Sir Georg Solti International Conductors' Competition. In 2003 he was appointed Assistant Conductor to Gerard Schwarz and the Royal Liverpool Philharmonic Orchestra where he later became Conductor in Residence.

He has worked with orchestras such as The Philharmonia, the Hallé, the London Mozart Players, the London Philharmonic, the BBC Concert Orchestra, the Orchestra of Opera North, the Sydney Symphony, the West Australian Symphony Orchestra, the Tasmanian Symphony Orchestra, the Victorian Opera (Melbourne), the New Zealand Symphony Orchestra, the Seattle Symphony and the Festival Orchestras on Schleswig-Holstein and Tanglewood.

In addition to the standard repertoire he regularly conducts Baroque music (with a particular interest in the music of Rameau) as well as much contemporary music - György Ligeti, Claude Vivier and György Kurtág are particular favourites. His wide range of musical interests is often reflected in a single programme usually connecting music from different periods by a single theme.

He has recorded the music of Georges Lentz for Naxos.

== Sources ==
- Philharmonia Orchestra
- Naxos
