= Christian Christiansen (musician) =

Danish pianist and organist

Christian Christiansen was Danish pianist and organist born in 1884.

He was known as a strong supporter of Carl Nielsen's music and used to perform it while touring in Europe. Nielsen's Wind Quintet was allegedly inspired when Nielsen overheard four members of the Copenhagen Wind Quintet practicing Mozart's Sinfonia Concertante in the background of a phone call he made to Christiansen in the autumn of 1921.

Christiansen also headed Royal Danish Academy of Music in 1947–1953. Niels Viggo Bentzon was among his pupils.

He died in 1955.
