= Paul Chiang (conductor) =

Taiwanese conductor

- Occupation: Conductor

Paul Chiang or Chiang Ching-po (also known as Po-Po Chiang; Chinese: 江靖波) is a Taiwanese symphony orchestra conductor, producer, chamber musician and violinist. He recently made his New York debut on June 19, 2007, at Carnegie Hall, conducting the New England Symphonic Ensemble in a programme featuring Beethoven and Mozart. His other major professional forthcoming engagements in Europe include a concert at the historic Teatro Olimpico in Vicenza, Italy, conducting the theatre's orchestra, as well as an appearance with another of Italy's professional orchestras the Magna Grecia Symphony Orchestra in Taranto, Italy. Chiang is also the Founder and artistic director of Philharmonia Moments Musicaux of Taipei, Taiwan.

In 2002, Danish Radio produced a special program focusing on Chiang and the orchestra he established and conducted since 1998. Danish Radio consequently aired throughout Denmark as well as Scandinavia an entire concert recorded live in Taipei, which included works by Atterberg and Nielsen, and Sibelius' profound 5th Symphony. Chiang and his ensemble Philharmonia Moments Musicaux were also featured in a special article by the London published, International Arts Manager Magazine, as one of Taiwan's most dynamic ensembles.

In September 2002, Chiang received a request to participate in the inaugural Sir Georg Solti International Conductors' Competition in Frankfurt, Germany, where some of the world's finest future conductors were present. Chiang was awarded third prize.
