= Aage Oxenvad =

Danish clarinetist (1884–1944)

Aage Oxenvad (16 January 1884 – 13 April 1944) was a Danish clarinetist who played in the Royal Danish Orchestra from 1909. Carl Nielsen wrote his Clarinet Concerto for Oxenvad who played at its premiere in 1928.

== Early life ==
Aage Oxenvad was born in the little village of Gettrup, in southern Jutland on 16 January 1884. As a child, he played the flute for dances with his father, the local musician, until he took up the clarinet when he was 12. He travelled every two weeks to Copenhagen to study with Carl Skjerne, the solo clarinetist with the Royal Danish Orchestra, who had studied under Richard Mühlfeld. Oxenvad studied at the Royal Conservatory (1903–1905) and for a short period in Paris.

== Career ==
Oxenvad joined the Royal Danish Orchestra in 1909 where he was the first to play the Boehm clarinet rather than the Oehler which Skjerne preferred. He was solo clarinetist from 1919 until his death in 1944. In an interview published in connection with his 60th birthday, Oxenvad explained he preferred living in a small house in the suburbs rather than in a flat in the centre where he worked. There he could chat with the local farmers and keep his own garden. He described the clarinet as "a living being, and must be treated like a woman, with a gentle yet firm hand...also unpredictable, like a woman...the clarinet is somber and expressive, and it possesses passion..."

In 1921, after being asked whether he could recommend Oxenvad, Carl Nielsen replied: "Mr. Oxenvad’s abilities and talent are highly exceptional in this country; not only his rare talent and skill as an instrumentalist, but his creative powers and theoretical knowledge are also uncommon. To this I can add that since he is responsive and understanding and his taste is flawless both in old and new art, it can hardly come as a surprise that I give him my very warmest recommendation". Oxenvad also greatly admired Carl Nielsen: "I loved Carl Nielsen above all...he is Denmark's greatest composer." Perhaps the affinity was based on their similar roots, both being brought up by poor parents living in the country.

He was member of the Copenhagen Wind Quintet. The first public performance of Nielsen's Wind Quintet by the Copenhagen Wind Quintet was on 9 October 1922.

A reviewer of the Clarinet Concerto's premiere on 14 September 1928 noted the great debt the work owed Oxenvad: "Hardly a more homogenous interpretation of this work could be imagined. Oxenvad has made a pact with trolls and giants. He has a temper, a primitive force harsh and clumsy, with a smattering of blue-eyed Danish amenity. Surely Carl Nielsen heard the sound of his clarinet when he wrote the Concerto."

== Assessment ==
On Oxenvad's death in 1944, his colleague Christian Felumb wrote of the great loss to the Royal Orchestra, the Conservatory and to Danish lovers of chamber music: "There was always a great festive spirit when Aage played chamber music... He was the undisputed centre of our old wind quintet, whether he was angry or happy... Carl Nielsen's Clarinet Concerto was not just a composition for the clarinet, it was also a concerto for Aage Oxenvad... No words can express what he conveyed in his music. It tells everything about Aage and his clarinet..."
