= Philharmonia Moment Musical =

The Philharmonia Moment Musical (PMM; Chinese: 樂興之時管絃樂團; pinyin: Yuèxīng Zhīshí Guǎnxián Yuètuán) is a non-professional symphony orchestra in Taiwan. It was founded in February 1999 by the Taiwanese conductor Po-Po Chiang. From 2002, PMM was selected as quality group of performing arts by Taiwan Council for Cultural Affairs in five consecutive years.

== Affiliates ==
- Youth Moment Musical - youth orchestra
- A Capella Moment Musical - women's choir

== See also ==
- List of symphony orchestras in Taiwan
