= Svend Westergaard =

Danish composer

- Born: October 8, 1922
- Died: June 22, 1988 (aged 65)
- Occupations: Composer; music theorist
- Known for: Teacher of Pelle Gudmundsen-Holmgreen

Svend Westergaard (8 October 1922 – 22 June 1988) was a Danish composer and music theorist. He was a teacher of the composer Pelle Gudmundsen-Holmgreen.

== See also ==
- List of Danish composers
