= Clarinet Concerto (Nielsen) =

Concerto by Carl Nielsen

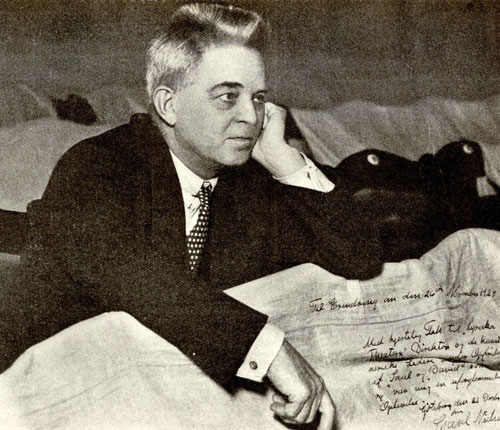
Carl Nielsen in 1928

Carl Nielsen's Concerto for Clarinet and orchestra, op. 57 [D.F.129] was written for Danish clarinetist Aage Oxenvad in 1928. The concerto is presented in one long movement, with four distinct theme groups.

== History ==
In 1921, Nielsen heard the Copenhagen Wind Quintet rehearsing some music by Mozart. He was struck by the tonal beauty and musicianship of this group, and he soon became intimately acquainted with its members. That same year, he wrote his Wind Quintet expressly for this ensemble. The last movement of this work is a theme and variations depicting in music the personalities of the five players and their respective instruments, much in the manner that Elgar portrayed his friends in the Enigma Variations.

Nielsen planned to carry the idea further; he wanted to write a concerto for each of his five friends. Only two of these compositions ever came into being. For Gilbert Jespersen, who succeeded Paul Hagemann as flautist of the Copenhagen Quintet, he wrote his Flute Concerto in 1926; two years later, he composed his Clarinet Concerto for the group's clarinettist, Aage Oxenvad. The latter work, completed August 15, 1928, was first heard in a private concert at the summer home of Carl Johan Michaelsen, in Humlebaek, on September 14, with Oxenvad as soloist and Emil Telmányi conducting. The same performers gave the premiere in Copenhagen on October 11 of that same year, when it met with a decidedly mixed reception. Since that time, it has gained much wider acceptance.

The Clarinet Concerto was conceived during the most difficult period in Nielsen's life. He was sixty-three, and had achieved considerable renown throughout Scandinavia; yet he was disappointed that his music had not reached a wider audience, he was deeply concerned with the unsettled state of the world, and he knew that his days were numbered. Perhaps this accounts for the bitter struggle which occurs throughout this concerto—a war between the tonalities of F major and E major. Every time hostilities seem to be at an end, a snare drum incites the combatants to renewed conflict. Another explanation for this is that the clarinetist for whom he was writing the concerto had a bi-polar disorder. Therefore, the concerto was poking fun at his constant mood swings.

This is how things went according to sources close to Nielsen:

Carl Nielsen’s friend Carl Johan Michaelsen had to urge him several times before he started composing a second concerto for a member of the Copenhagen Wind Quintet. This time it revolved around clarinettist Aage Oxenvad. Nielsen started composing in the spring of 1928. On 15 August he completed the score at Damgaard. Emil Telmányi had already started on an arrangement for piano for the benefit of Oxenvad, who grumbled that Nielsen must be able to play the clarinet since he had systematically used the notes that are most difficult to play.

The Concerto was performed for the first time on 14 September at a private concert in Carl Johan Michaelsen’s summer villa Højtofte, in Humlebæk, north of Copenhagen. The soloist was Oxenvad, to whom the Concerto is dedicated. Twenty-two members of the Chapel Royal were conducted by Emil Telmányi. The first public performance took place in Copenhagen on 11 October with the same players, and received a generally positive reception. Politiken wrote:

“... he has liberated the soul of the clarinet, not only the wild animal aspect but also its special brand of ruthless poetry.... This work could hardly have found a more homogeneous interpretation. Oxenvad’s sonority is in tune with the trolls and the giants, and he has soul, a rough and stocky primordial force mixed with naive Danish mildness. Certainly Carl Nielsen must have had his particular clarinet sound in mind while composing this Concerto.”

== Structure ==
Eschewing the large classical concerto form, Nielsen has cast the Clarinet Concerto in one continuous movement. It begins with a firm Allegretto un poco, relieved by a somewhat more songful second theme. There is much stormy strife between the soloist and the orchestra and between the two principal competing keys. This is followed by a Poco adagio, interrupted several times by quicker, more disturbed sections. The final part is an energetic Allegro vivace, but a return to the Adagio brings the work to what Robert Simpson calls an ending of "calm severity," with the key of F major ultimately triumphant.

In his admirably thorough study of Carl Nielsen and his music, Robert Simpson points out what inventive use the composer made of tonality, and this at a time when other composers threw it over for atonality.

Despite the storm and stress in the concerto, the composer has kept his forces down almost to chamber music proportions. In addition to the solo clarinet, the only other instruments called for in the score are two bassoons, two horns, snare drum and strings. Because of the prominence of the snare drum line in the piece, a snare drum is still called for in the piano reduction.

== Celebration concert ==
The Clarinet Concerto was one of the three items chosen for the gala concert in Copenhagen celebrating the 150th anniversary of Carl Nielsen's birth. Accompanied by Danmark Radio's Symphony Orchestra conducted by Juanjo Mena, the soloist was the Finnish clarinetist Olli Leppäniemi (born 1980).

== Sources ==
- Liner notes by Paul Affelder from the Louis Cahuzac recording, John Frandsen conducting the Copenhagen Royal Opera Orchestra, Columbia Records.
- Bingham, Ann Marie: Carl Nielsen's koncert for Klarinet og Orkester, opus 57 (1928): A performance guide, D.M.A. diss., University of Kentucky 1990, 220 p.
- Master Class with Burt Hara at University of Iowa, Fall 2006.

Very interesting further reading is provided by posts by Eric Nelson on 9 and 11 February 1997 on the Klarinet reflector .

Further interesting reading challenging the popular view that the Concerto is primarily about Aage Oxenvad and his personality can be found at: Monroe, Douglas C: Conflict and Meaning in Carl Nielsen's Concerto for Clarinet and Orchestra, Op. 57 (1928). D.M.A. diss., The Ohio State University 2008, 90 pp.

== Discography ==
=== Recordings on 78RPM ===
- Louis Cahuzac. Nielsen, Columbia LDX 7000-02 © 1947, (p) 1947

=== Recordings on LP ===
- Louis Cahuzac. Nielsen, Columbia ML-2219 © 1947, (p) 1947
- Josef Deak. Carl Nielsen, Turnabout Vox TV34261 © 1969, (p) 1969
- Stanley Drucker. CBS 72639, Columbia MS-7028, (p) 1967
- Ib Eriksson. clarinet Concerto, Decca LXT-2979, Decca ACL-292, London LL-1142 © 1954, (p) 1954
- Benny Goodman. Nielsen..., RCA SB-6701, RCA LSC-2920 (p) 1966
- John McCaw. Nielsen, Unicorn UNS-239 © 1971, (p) 1971
- Albert Sandström. Clarinet Concerto, Primo 011 © 1979, (p) 1979
- Kjell-Inge Stevensson. Nielsen, EMI SLS-5027 (c) 1975, (p) 1975
- Kalev Velthut. Clarinet Concerto, Melodija C10 28491 002 © 1989

=== Recordings available on CD ===
- Kevin Banks. Concerto, Naxos 8.554189 © 1998, (p) 1997
- François Benda. Feuerwerke, FONO FSM FCD 97 212 © 1995, (p) 1995 (1993 recording)
- François Benda. GENUIN GEN88128 © 2008, (p) 2008 (reissue of 1993 recording)
- Walter Boeykens. Nielsen, Harmonia Mundi 901489 © 1994, (p) 1994
- Louis Cahuzac. Nielsen, the Historic Recordings, Clarinet Classics cc0002 © 1992, (p) 1947
- Philippe Cuper. Copland/Francaix/Nielsen, ADDA 581315 © 1993, (p) 1992
- Stanley Drucker. The Royal Edition no 61 of 100, Sony Classical SMK 47599 © 1993 (p) 1967
- Ib Eriksson. clarinet Concerto, Dutton Laboratories CDLXT 2505 (c) 1954, (p) 1954
- Martin Fröst. Nielsen & Aho clarinet concertos, BIS SACD-1463 (c) 2007, (p) 2007
- Benny Goodman. Nielsen..., RCA Classics (Classical Navigator 88) 74321 29255 2 (c) 1995, (p) 1966
- Janet Hilton. Concertos, Chandos CHAN 8618, (c) 1988 (p) 1988
- Kojo Kullervo. Nielsen/Eglund/Crusell, Finlandia 4509-95873-2 (c) 1993, (p) 1993
- John Kruse. Nielsen, Kontrapunkt 32254 (c) 1997, (p) 1997
- John McCaw. Nielsen, The concertos, Regis RRC1208, s.d. (re-issue of Unicorn 1971)
- Spyros Mourikis. Nielsen, P2musik DR ISCR DK-QHA—98-001 (c) 1997 (p) 1997
- Arne Møller. Nielsen, Classico CLASSCD 514 (in album CLASSCD 514–15) (c) 1965, (p) 1965
- Robert Plane. Clarinet Concerto, BBC MM205 (c) 1999, (p) 1999
- Håkan Rosengren. Clarinet Concerto, Sony SK 53 276 (c) 1991, (p) 1991
- Olle Schill. Concerto, BIS CD-616 (in album CD-614-16) (c) 1985 (p) 1985
- Kjell-Inge Stevensson. Nielsen, EMI Classics 0946 3 81503 2 9 (c) 1975, (p) 1975
- Andreas Sundén. Carl Nielsen Solo Concertos, Daphne 1056 (c) 2018, (p) 2018
- Richard Stoltzman. Lutoslawski/Nielsen/Prokofiev, RCA Victor Red Seal 09026-63836-2 (c) 2001, (p) 2001
- Niels Thomsen. Nielsen, Chandos CHAN 8894, (c) 1990, (p) 1990
- John Bruce Yeh. clarinet Concerto Centaur CRC 2024, (c) 1985, (p) 1985
- Sabine Meyer. Carl Nielsen: Clarinet & Flute Concertos; Wind Quintet, Warner Classics, 2007
- Sebastian Manz. "Nielsen & Lindberg Clarinet Concertos" Berlin Classics 0301351BC © 2020, (p) 2019
- Daniel Ottensamer. Nielsen・Grieg, Sony Classical 19658801812, (c) 2023, (p) 2023

=== Recordings on SACD ===
- Martin Fröst. Nielsen & Aho clarinet concertos, BIS SACD-1463 (c) 2007, (p) 2007

=== First recording ===
- Louis Cahuzac, Nielsen, the Historic Recordings, Clarinet Classics cc0002 (c) 1992, (p) 1947
