= Ludwig A. Colding =

Danish engineer and physicist (1815–1888)

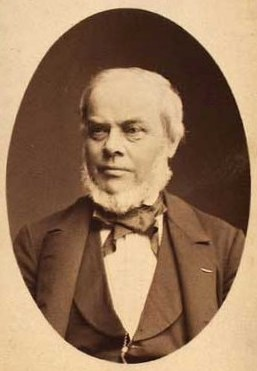
Ludwig A. Colding

Ludwig August Colding (13 July 1815 – 21 March 1888) was a Danish civil engineer and physicist who articulated the principle of conservation of energy contemporaneously with, and independently of, James Prescott Joule and Julius Robert von Mayer though his contribution was largely overlooked and neglected.

== Life ==
Born in Holbæk, Denmark, his father, Andreas Christian, had been an officer in the Danish privateer service. Ludwig's mother, Anna Sophie, was the daughter of a clergyman and imbued the household with a deeply religious sentiment. Around the time of Ludwig's birth, his father retired from seafaring and took up a position as a farm manager. He seems to have been particularly unsuited to such a profession and this, together with the upheavals of the Napoleonic Wars in Denmark, subjected the young Ludwig to a rather irregular childhood and schooling.

Hans Christian Ørsted was an old family friend and arranged for Colding to serve an apprenticeship under a craftsman in Copenhagen, Colding achieving the status of journeyman in 1836. Ørsted had, by this stage, become something of a mentor to the young Colding and encouraged him to enroll at the Copenhagen Polytechnic Institute. The Institute had been founded at Ørsted's initiative and he offered continual advice and support to the young Colding. At the polytechnic Colding showed the most undaunted diligence and the most conscientious precision and in 1839 Ørsted engaged Colding to assist on some exacting measurements of the release of heat by compressed water.

Colding graduated in 1841 and worked as a teacher before being appointed inspector of roads and bridges in Copenhagen in 1845. Colding's importance and influence grew until he was appointed state engineer for Copenhagen in 1857. He oversaw a vast range of public housing, transport, lighting and sanitation projects and gained a high reputation throughout Denmark and internationally. He retired from professional engineering in 1886.

== Scientific work ==
Colding found time for private scientific work in fluid mechanics, hydrology, oceanography and meteorology as well as electromagnetism and thermodynamics. He was largely responsible for founding the Danish Meteorological Institute in 1872. However, he is best remembered for what he himself termed the "principle of imperishability of the forces of nature." Colding was influenced by D'Alembert's principle of "lost forces", by Hans Christian Ørsted, by the Naturphilosophie to which Ørsted subscribed and by his own religious upbringing.

My first thought concerning the imperishability of the forces of nature I have ... borrowed from the view that the forces of nature must be related to the spiritual in nature, to the eternal reason as well as to the human soul. Thus it was the religious philosophy of life that led me to the concept of the imperishability of forces. By this line of reasoning I became convinced that just as it is true that the human soul is immortal, so it must also surely be a general law of nature that the forces of nature are imperishable.

Colding first fulfilled his ambition to work alongside Ørsted, who was conducting experiments on the compressibility of water, in 1839. He summarised this work with a review of other data on compression and friction of various materials in his first published scientific paper. In this work, he went on to state that "the quantities of heat evolved are, in every case, proportional to the lost moving forces" though he did not calculate a mechanical equivalent of heat as Joule was to do in the same year.

With Ørsted's support, a further series of quantitative experiments was sponsored by the Royal Danish Academy of Sciences and Letters, culminating in a report in 1847. By 1850, Colding had obtained a value for the mechanical equivalent of heat, some 14% lower than the modern value (4.1860 J·cal^{−1}) at a time when Joule had measured 4.159 J·cal^{−1}. A subsequent calculation by Colding in 1852 yielded a value only 3% below modern values.

== Works ==
- 1856: Scientific reflections on the relationship between intellectual life’s activity and the general forces of nature
- 1863: On the History of the Principle of the Conservation of Energy, Philosophical Magazine, Series 4, 27: 56–64 via Biodiversity Heritage Library
- 1871: On the Universal Powers of Nature and their Mutual Dependence, Philosophical Magazine, Series 4, 42: 1–20

== Legacy ==
Colding's thermodynamic work was neglected both in his native Denmark and internationally though, from a historical perspective, he seems to deserve no less credit in the development of the concept of energy than Joule or Mayer. However, his contributions to meteorology and the built environment of Copenhagen are notable in themselves.

== Honours ==
- Elected a member of the Royal Swedish Academy of Sciences in 1875.
- Cross of Honour of the Order of the Dannebrog, (1886)
