= Wind Quintet (Nielsen) =

- by Carl Nielsen
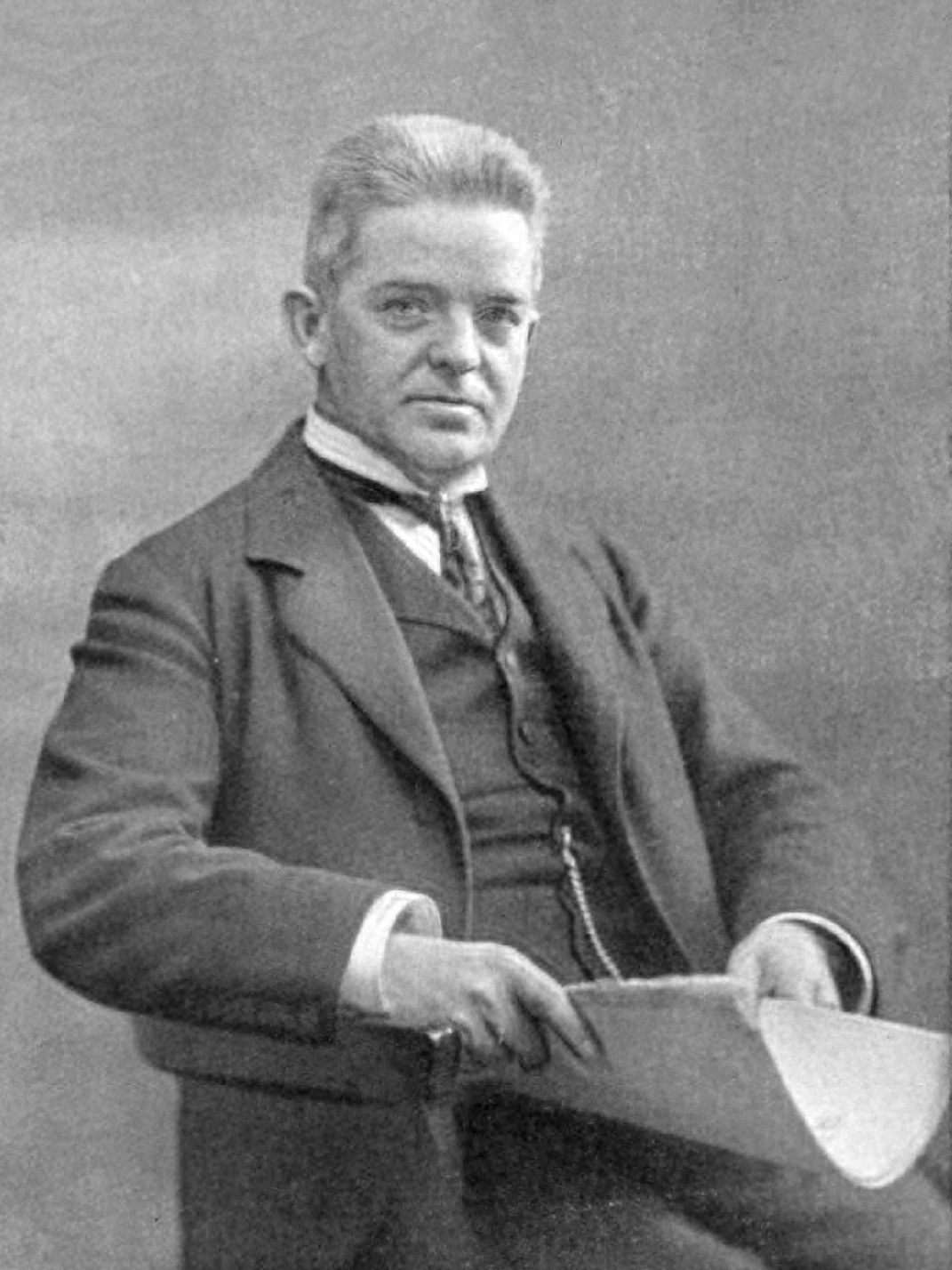
- The composer in 1917
- Catalogue: FS 100; CNW 70; Op. 43
- Dedication: Copenhagen Wind Quintet
- Published: 1923: Copenhagen
- Publisher: Wilhelm Hansen
- Scoring: flute; oboe (english horn); clarinet; horn; bassoon

Premiere
- Date: 9 October 1922
- Location: Odd Fellows Mansion, Copenhagen
- Performers: Copenhagen Wind Quintet

Carl Nielsen's Wind Quintet, or as indicated by the original score, the Kvintet for Fløjte, Obo, Klarinet, Horn og Fagot, Op. 43, was composed early in 1922 in Gothenburg, Sweden, where it was first performed privately at the home of Herman and Lisa Mannheimer on 30 April 1922. The first public performance was on 9 October 1922 in the smaller hall at the Odd Fellows Mansion in Copenhagen. It is considered a staple of the repertoire for wind quintet.

== Background ==
According to his biographer Torben Meyer, Carl Nielsen started composing the wind quintet in the autumn of 1921 after hearing four members of the Copenhagen Wind Quintet (flautist: Paul Hagemann, oboist: Svend C. Felumb, clarinettist: Aage Oxenvad, hornist: Hans Sørensen, bassoonist: Knud Lassen) rehearsing the Sinfonia Concertante by Mozart with the pianist Christian Christiansen, whom Nielsen was having a telephone conversation with while the winds rehearsed. It was these musicians he specifically had in mind when he wrote the piece.

British composer and biographer Robert Simpson writes, "Nielsen’s fondness of wind instruments is closely related to his love of nature, his fascination for living, breathing things. He was also intensely interested in human character, and in the Wind Quintet composed deliberately for five friends, each part is cunningly made to suit the individuality of each player."

== Music ==
In a programme note, Nielsen himself provided a description of the work:

The quintet for winds is one of the composer’s latest works, in which he has attempted to render the characters of the various instruments. At one moment they are all talking at once, at another they are quite alone. The work consists of three movements: a) Allegro, b) Minuet and c) Prelude – Theme with Variations. The theme for these variations is the melody for one of C.N.’s spiritual songs, which has here been made the basis of a set of variations, now merry and quirky, now elegiac and serious, ending with the theme in all its simplicity and very quietly expressed.

Overall, the piece combines aspects of neo-classicism and modernism. The first movement is in sonata form, the second is a minuet with a rustic quality and the third opens with a short praeludium followed by a set of variations.

=== I. Allegro ben moderato ===
The first movement begins with a statement of the theme in the bassoon in E followed by a reply in the upper winds before being repeated by the horn in the key of A major, which is then followed by fragmentations of the theme. The second theme enters in D minor and is played first by the horn, followed by the oboe and bassoon, all the while being accompanied by triplet figures in the flute and clarinet. The development begins after a restatement of the first theme. The recapitulation begins in E major and the second theme is in B minor and is now harmonized in thirds with the horn and bassoon. The movement eventually ends in the key of E. Overall, the movement appears to be written in the key of E, the dominant of the following two movements which are predominantly in the key of A.

=== II. Menuet ===
The second movement is fairly neoclassical and scores the horn lightly, allowing the player to rest. The first theme is presented as a duet between the bassoon and clarinet, and similarly, the second theme is also presented as a duet between the flute and oboe. This material is fairly simple, and all instruments are present when the first theme recaps. The trio, played by the bassoon, oboe, and flute, is canonic and contrapuntal in nature, contrasting with the simpler first and second themes.

=== III. Praeludium – Theme with Variations ===
In the Praeludium, the oboe is replaced by the cor anglais, providing a different tone colour to an already colourful work. This change is thought to have been inspired by oboist Felumb's cor anglais solo during a performance of Hector Berlioz's Symphonie fantastique that Nielsen conducted in Bremen. The variations are based on Nielsen's own chorale tune Min Jesus, lad min Hjerte faa en saaden Smag paa dig (My Jesus, make my heart to love thee). The variations are the most complex part of the piece and consist of the theme, 11 variations, and a final restatement of the theme.

== Reception ==
Wind Quintet, Op. 43
I. Allegro ben moderato

II. Menuetto

III. Praeludium: Adagio. Tema con variazioni: Un poco andantino
Performed by James Galway (flute) with the Carion Quintet

The first public performance was on 9 October 1922 in the smaller hall at the Odd Fellows Mansion in Copenhagen. It was performed by the five musicians mentioned in the Copenhagen Wind Quintet. The reviews were positive. Berlinske Tidende mentioned the work's "manly seriousness, rhythmic grace, fertile humour... The theme [of the third movement] turned out to be Carl Nielsen's beautiful melody for the hymn My Jesus, let my heart receive (Min Jesus, lad mit Hjerte faa from Halvthundrede Salmer) – only one line of music, but the longing and devotion of a mind are released in these few bars." It concluded that "the members of the Wind Quintet gave the new work an excellent performance and were rewarded with the warmest applause."

Nielsen scholar Robert Simpson said the following about the Quintet.

It is more than arguable that his Wind Quintet is the subtlest and finest ever written, that the Flute Concerto is much the best there is, and that the Clarinet Concerto is the greatest since Mozart. These are not extravagant claims. It is perhaps a curious thing that Nielsen, who was a violinist (though he played cornet in his youth) often wrote with greater perspicacity for wind than for strings. Nielsen shows great imagination and ingenuity in conjuring a surprising variety of sonorities and blends from the wind quintet; few would suppose from this work that one of the chief difficulties of this combination is the fact that the five instruments do not blend.

The wind quintet was frequently played during the composer's lifetime, including a performance at the International Music Week in Berlin on 29 March 1923. It was also performed at his funeral in 1931.

== Performances today ==
On the basis of information from the Carl Nielsen Society, the Wind Quintet is one of Nielsen's most widely performed works, both in Scandinavia and the rest of the world.
