= Royal Danish Academy of Music =

Music education institution in Copenhagen, Denmark

- Det Kongelige Danske Musikkonservatorium
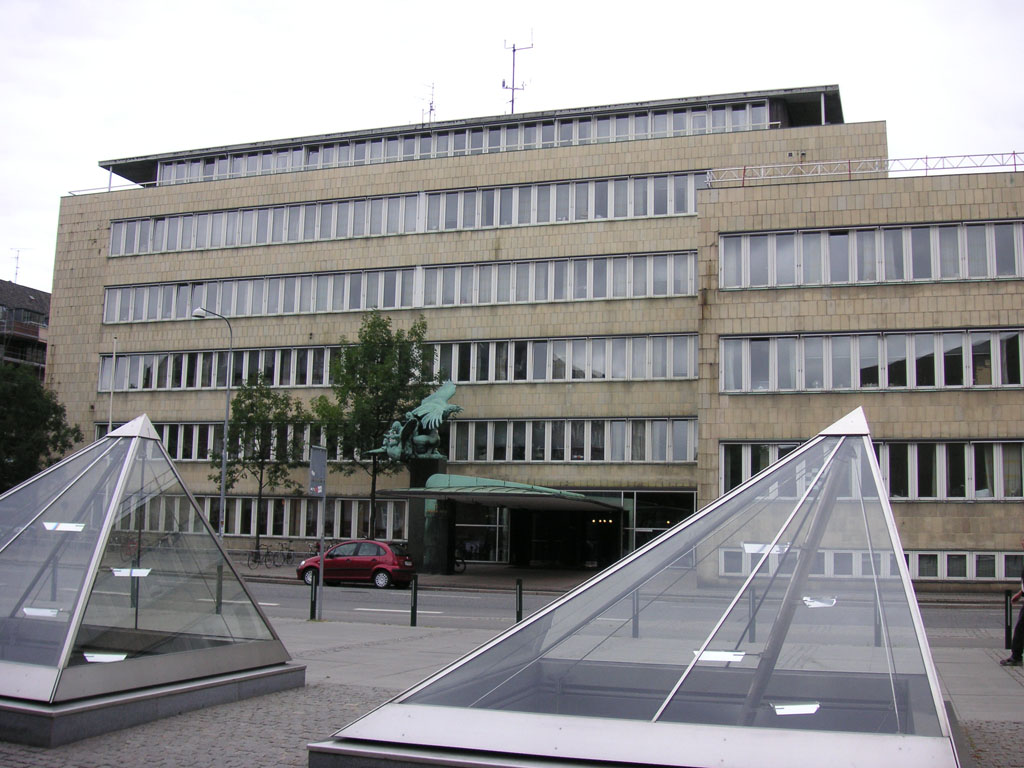
- Former names: Kjøbenhavns Musikkonservatorium
- Type: Public
- Established: 1867; 159 years ago
- Founders: P.W. Moldenhauer, Niels Gade, J.P.E. Hartmann, Holger Simon Paulli
- Rector: Uffe Savery
- Students: 400
- Location: Copenhagen, Denmark
- Website: https://english.dkdm.dk

The Royal Danish Academy of Music, or Royal Danish Conservatory of Music (Danish: Det Kongelige Danske Musikkonservatorium), in Copenhagen is the oldest professional institution of musical education in Denmark as well as the largest, with approximately 400 students. It was established in 1867 as Kjøbenhavns Musikkonservatorium by Niels Gade – who was also the first rector –, J.P.E. Hartmann and Holger Simon Paulli on the basis of a testamentary gift from the jeweler P.W. Moldenhauer, and with inspiration from the Leipzig Conservatory and a conservatory founded by Giuseppe Siboni in Copenhagen in 1827. Carl Nielsen was a teacher in the period 1916–1919 and the rector during the last year of his life.

The academy was renamed to Det Kongelige Danske Musikkonservatorium in 1902 and became a national state institution in 1949. Queen Margrethe II of Denmark is Protector of the institution.

Originally located on H.C. Andersens Boulevard, it relocated into Radiohuset, the former headquarters of the Danish national radio broadcasting corporation DR, on 1 September 2008 and took over the concert hall under the name Konservatoriets Koncertsal.

== Administration ==
Rectors of the academy:

- 1867–1890: Niels Gade
- 1890–1899: Johan Peter Emilius Hartmann
- 1899–1915: Otto Malling
- 1915–1930: Anton Svendsen
- 1930–1931: Carl Nielsen
- 1931–1947: Rudolph Simonsen
- 1947–1954: Christian Christiansen
- 1954–1955: Finn Høffding
- 1956–1967: Knudåge Riisager
- 1967–1971: Svend Westergaard
- 1971–1975: Poul Birkelund
- 1976–1979: Friedrich Gürtler
- 1979–1986: Anne-Karin Høgenhaven
- 1992–2007: Steen Pade
- 2007–2019: Bertel Krarup
- Since 2019: Uffe Savery
