= Finlandia Prize =

Literary award

- Awarded for: Outstanding Finnish literary work
- Location: Helsinki
- Country: Finland
- Presented by: Finnish Book Foundation
- Rewards: A monetary award of 30,000 EUR, originally 100,000 FIM
- First award: 1984; 42 years ago
- Website: kirjasaatio.fi/en/finlandia-prizes

The Finlandia Prize (Finnish: Finlandia-palkinto; Swedish: Finlandiaprisen) is a set of Finnish literary prizes awarded by the Finnish Book Foundation to "celebrate reading and highlight new Finnish first-rate literature." Considered the most prestigious in the nation, they are awarded annually in three categories: fiction, non-fiction and children's and youth literature. The prize was first awarded in 1984.

The award sum (as of 2022) is 30,000 euros (originally 100,000 Finnish Marks). According to the Finnish Ministry of Finance, this is tax-exempt income for the author. Only publishers can submit books to nomination and the books may be in Finnish or Swedish and also works in other languages may be considered. Prior to 2010 only works written by citizens of Finland were allowed but the rules were changed when Alexandra Salmela, a citizen of Slovakia, was nominated.

Since 1984, in addition to the fiction category, the Little Finlandia Prize (Finnish: Pikku-Finlandia-palkinto/Swedish: Finlandia Junior) for the best student essay on literature has been administered by the Finnish Language Teachers’ Union in cooperation with the Finnish Book Foundation.

== Finlandia Prize in Fiction ==
The Finlandia Prize in Fiction, the oldest of the three categories, has been awarded for an outstanding Finnish work of fiction since 1984. Since 1993, however, the prize has been awarded exclusively to novels.

Year	Author	Chooser	Work	Language
1984	Erno Paasilinna		Yksinäisyys ja uhma	Finnish
1985	Jörn Donner		Far och son	Swedish
1986	Sirkka Turkka		Tule takaisin, pikku Sheba	Finnish
1987	Helvi Hämäläinen		Sukupolveni unta	Finnish
1988	Gösta Ågren		Jär	Swedish
1989	Markku Envall		Samurai nukkuu	Finnish
1990	Olli Jalonen		Isäksi ja tyttäreksi	Finnish
1991	Arto Melleri		Elävien kirjoissa	Finnish
1992	Leena Krohn		Matemaattisia olioita tai jaettuja unia	Finnish
1993	Bo Carpelan	Kai Laitinen	Urwind	Swedish
1994	Eeva Joenpelto	Tellervo Koivisto	Tuomari Müller, hieno mies	Finnish
1995	Hannu Mäkelä	Maria-Liisa Nevala	Mestari	Finnish
1996	Irja Rane	Aki Kaurismäki	Naurava neitsyt	Finnish
1997	Antti Tuuri	Lassi Nummi	Lakeuden kutsu	Finnish
1998	Pentti Holappa	Liisamaija Laaksonen	Ystävän muotokuva	Finnish
1999	Kristina Carlson	Erkki Liikanen	Maan ääreen	Finnish
2000	Johanna Sinisalo	Auli Viikari	Ennen päivänlaskua ei voi	Finnish
2001	Hannu Raittila	Claes Andersson	Canal Grande	Finnish
2002	Kari Hotakainen	Lasse Pöysti	Juoksuhaudantie	Finnish
2003	Pirkko Saisio	Mervi Kantokorpi	Punainen erokirja	Finnish
2004	Helena Sinervo	Jukka Sarjala	Runoilijan talossa	Finnish
2005	Bo Carpelan	Paavo Lipponen	Berg	Swedish
2006	Kjell Westö	Jyrki Nummi	Där vi en gång gått	Swedish
2007	Hannu Väisänen	Kaisu Mikkola	Toiset kengät	Finnish
2008	Sofi Oksanen	Pekka Tarkka	Puhdistus	Finnish
2009	Antti Hyry	Tuula Arkio	Uuni	Finnish
2010	Mikko Rimminen	Minna Joenniemi	Nenäpäivä	Finnish
2011	Rosa Liksom	Pekka Milonoff	Hytti nro 6	Finnish
2012	Ulla-Lena Lundberg	Tarja Halonen	Is	Swedish
2013	Riikka Pelo	Asko Sarkola	Jokapäiväinen elämämme	Finnish
2014	Jussi Valtonen	Anne Brunila	He eivät tiedä mitä tekevät	Finnish
2015	Laura Lindstedt	Hector	Oneiron	Finnish
2016	Jukka Viikilä	Baba Lybeck	Akvarelleja Engelin kaupungista	Finnish
2017	Juha Hurme	Elisabeth Rehn	Niemi	Finnish
2018	Olli Jalonen	Seppo Puttonen	Taivaanpallo	Finnish
2019	Pajtim Statovci	Merja Ylä-Anttila	Bolla	Finnish
2020	Anni Kytömäki	Hannu Lintu	Margarita	Finnish
2021	Jukka Viikilä	Zaida Bergroth	Taivaallinen vastaanotto	Finnish
2022	Iida Rauma	Mari Leppänen	Hävitys: Tapauskertomus	Finnish
2023	Sirpa Kähkönen	Jorma Uotinen	36 uurnaa - Väärässä olemisen historia	Finnish
2024	Pajtim Statovci	Alma Pöysti	Lehmä synnyttää yöllä	Finnish
2025	Monika Fagerholm	Maija Vilkkumaa	Döda trakten/Kvinnor i revolt	Swedish

== Finlandia Prize in Children's and Youth Literature ==
The Finlandia Prize in Children's and Youth Literature (formerly the Finlandia Junior Prize) is awarded for children's and youth literature.

Year	Author	Title	Title English	Elector	Language
1997	Alexis Kouros	Gondwanan lapset	Gondwana's Children		Finnish
1998	Leena Laulajainen	Kultamarja ja metsän salaisuudet	The Golden Berry and the Secrets of the Forest		Finnish
1999	Kari Levola	Tahdon	I Do		Finnish
2000	Tomi Kontio	Keväällä isä sai siivet	In the Spring, Father Got Wings	Riitta Uosukainen	Finnish
2001	Kira Poutanen	Ihana meri	The Wonderful Sea	M. A. Numminen	Finnish
2002	Raili Mikkanen	Ei ole minulle suvannot		Päivi Lipponen	Finnish
2003	Arja Puikkonen	Haloo kuuleeko kaupunki		Kirsti Mäkinen	Finnish
2004	Riitta Jalonen	Tyttö ja naakkapuu		Jukka Kajava	Finnish
2005	Tuula Korolainen	Kuono kohti tähteä		Matti Ranin	Finnish
2006	Timo Parvela	Keinulauta	Seesaw	Jukka Virtanen	Finnish
2007	Aino Havukainen and Sami Toivonen	Tatun ja Patun Suomi		Inkeri Näätsaari	Finnish
2008	Esko-Pekka Tiitinen	Villapäät		Maria Kaisa Aula	Finnish
2009	Mari Kujanpää	Minä ja Muro		Marko Vuoriheimo	Finnish
2010	Siri Kolu	Me Rosvolat		Hannu-Pekka Björkman	Finnish
2011	Vilja-Tuulia Huotarinen	Valoa, valoa, valoa		Paula Vesala	Finnish
2012	Christel Rönns	Det vidunderliga ägget		Mari Rantasila	Swedish
2013	Kreetta Onkeli	Poika joka menetti muistinsa		Jarno "Jarppi" Leppälä	Finnish
2014	Maria Turtschaninoff	Maresi. Krönikor från det röda klostret	Maresi: the Red Abbey Chronicles	Johanna Vuoksenmaa	Swedish
2015	Nadja Sumanen	Rambo		Heikki Harma	Finnish
2016	Juuli Niemi	Et kävele yksin		Vuokko Hovatta	Finnish
2017	Sanna Mander	Nyckelknipan		Anna Puu	Swedish
2018	Siiri Enoranta	Tuhatkuolevan kirous		Riku Rantala	Finnish
2019	Marisha Rasi-Koskinen	Auringon pimeä puoli		Olavi Uusivirta	Finnish
2020	Anja Portin	Radio Popov		Christoffer Strandberg	Finnish
2021	Anne-Maija Aalto	Mistä valo pääsee sisään		Perttu Pölönen	Finnish
2022	Sofia Chanfreau & Amanda Chanfreau	Giraffens hjärta är ovanligt stort		Ernest Lawson	Swedish
2023	Magdalena Hai	Sarvijumala		Herra Ylppö	Finnish
2024	Päivi Lukkarila	Skutsi		Maria Veitola	Finnish
2025	Tomi Kontio & Elina Warsta	Kissa hyvästelee ystävän		Mustafe Muuse	Finnish

Note: English title column may reflect a published book, or just a translated title.

== Finlandia Prize in Non-Fiction ==
The Finlandia Prize in Non-Fiction is considered Finland's most significant non-fiction award.

Year	Author	Chooser	Work	Language
1989	Erik Tawaststjerna		Jean Sibelius 1–5	Finnish
1990	Markku Löytönen		Matka-arkku. Suomalaisia tutkimusmatkailijoita	Finnish
1991	Olli Marttila, Tari Haahtela, Hannu Aarnio, Pekka Ojalainen		Suomen päiväperhoset	Finnish
1992	Jukka Salo, Mikko Pyhälä		Amazonia	Finnish
1993	Erik Wahlström, Tapio Reinikainen, Eeva-Liisa Hallanoro		Ympäristön tila Suomessa	Finnish
1994	Heikki Ylikangas		Tie Tampereelle. Dokumentoitu kuvaus Tampereen antautumiseen johtaneista sotatapahtumista Suomen sisällissodassa	Finnish
1995	Matti Sarmela		Suomen perinneatlas	Finnish
1996	Pekka Kivikäs		Kalliomaalaukset – muinainen kuva-arkistomme	Finnish
1997	Fabian Dahlström, Erkki Salmenhaara, Mikko Heiniö		Suomen musiikin historia 1–4	Finnish
1998	Hannu Karttunen	Leena Palotie	Vanhin tiede. Tähtitiedettä kivikaudesta kuulentoihin	Finnish
1999	Kari Enqvist		Olemisen porteilla	Finnish
2000	Anu Kantola et al.		Maailman tila ja Suomi	Finnish
2001	Heikki Paunonen, Marjatta Paunonen		Tsennaaks Stadii, bonjaaks slangii. Stadin slangin suursanakirja	Finnish
2002	Esko Valtaoja	Metropolitan Ambrosius	Kotona maailmankaikkeudessa	Finnish
2003	Antti Helanterä, Veli-Pekka Tynkkynen	Astrid Gartz	Maantieteelle Venäjä ei voi mitään	Finnish
2004	Elina Sana	Hannu Taanila	Luovutetut. Suomen ihmisluovutukset Gestapolle	Finnish
2005	Sami Koski, Mika Rissanen, Juha Tahvanainen	Kari Raivio	Antiikin urheilu	Finnish
2005	Jari Leskinen, Antti Juutilainen	Helena Ranta	Jatkosodan pikkujättiläinen	Finnish
2006	Erkki Tuomioja	Raimo Väyrynen	Häivähdys punaista. Hella Wuolijoki ja hänen sisarensa Salme Pekkala vallankumouksen palveluksessa. English title: A Delicate Shade of Pink	English
2007	Peter von Bagh	Matti Apunen	Sininen laulu	Finnish
2008	Marjo T. Nurminen	Veikko Sonninen	Tiedon tyttäret	Finnish
2009	Henrika Tandefelt	Björn Wahlroos	Borgå 1809. Ceremoni och fest	Swedish
2010	Vesa Sirén	Sinikka Salo	Suomalaiset kapellimestarit	Finnish
2011	Soili Stenroos, Teuvo Ahti, Katileena Lohtander, Leena Myllys	Alf Rehn	Suomen jäkäläopas	Finnish
2012	Elina Lappalainen	Janne Virkkunen	Syötäväksi kasvatetut – Miten ruokasi eli elämänsä	Finnish
2013	Ville Kivimäki	Maija Tanninen-Mattila	Murtuneet Mielet. English title: Broken Minds	Finnish
2014	Mirkka Lappalainen	Heikki Hellman	Pohjolan Leijona – Kustaa II Adolf ja Suomi 1611–1632	Finnish
2015	Tapio Tamminen	Arto Nyberg	Kansankodin pimeämpi puoli	Finnish
2016	Mari Manninen	Jörn Donner	Yhden lapsen kansa - Kiinan salavauvat, pikkukeisarit ja hylätyt tyttäret	Finnish
2017	Riitta Kylänpää	Matti Rönka	Pentti Linkola - Ihminen ja legenda	Finnish
2018	Seppo Aalto	Virpi Suutari	Kapina tehtailla – Kuusankoski 1918	Finnish
2019	Anssi Jokiranta, Pekka Juntti, Anna Ruohonen & Jenni Räinä	Sixten Korkman	Metsä meidän jälkeemme	Finnish
2020	Marko Tikka & Seija-Leena Nevala	Nasima Razmyar	Kielletyt leikit – Tanssin kieltämisen historia Suomessa 1888–1948	Finnish
2021	Osmo Tapio Räihälä	Katri Makkonen	Miksi nykymusiikki on niin vaikeaa	Finnish
2022	Ville-Juhani Sutinen	Hanna Nohynek	Vaivan arvoista. Esseitä poikkeuskirjallisuudesta	Finnish
2023	Antti Järvi	Linda Liukas	Minne katosi Antti Järvi?	Finnish
2024	Sofia Tawast & Riikka Leinonen	Pekka Haavisto	Suuri valhe vammaisuudesta	Finnish
2025	Paavo Teittinen	Antti Kuronen	Pitkä vuoro. Kuinka moderni orjuus juurtui Suomeen	
