= Nordic Business Forum =

Finnish organization

- Founded: 2008
- Headquarters: Jyväskylä, Finland
- Region served: Worldwide
- CEO: Priit Liiv
- Website: www.nbforum.com

Nordic Business Forum (NBF) is a Finnish company, based in Jyväskylä. The company is best known for its eponymous business and leadership conference in Helsinki.

Nordic Business Forum is part of Nordic Business Group, which employs 31 people across Finland, Sweden, Norway, and Estonia. The current managing director is Priit Liiv. Nordic Business Forum is also a part of Business Forum Group which oversees the activities of Nordic Business Forum, Oslo Business Forum, and Amsterdam Business Forum.

The annual main event, Nordic Business Forum, gathers together over 7500 attendees from over 40 countries, 17.4% of the attendees being CEOs.

== Organisation and history ==
Nordic Business Forum is a subsidiary of the Nordic Business Group, which was founded in 2008 by Hans-Peter Siefen and Jyri Lindén. It was originally known as the Finnish Community of Entrepreneurship before changing its name in 2011.

The first Nordic Business Forum conference was held in October 2010. The following year, the first high-profile international speakers—former US Vice President Al Gore and motivational speaker Les Brown—were added to the lineup.

In 2013, Nordic Business Forum added a professional board of directors and held its first event outside of Finland—Sales Master Day in Tallinn, Estonia—featuring sales guru Brian Tracy.

The first Nordic Business Forum Sweden event was held in Stockholm in 2017, with a Nordic Business Forum Norway event being added in Oslo the following year.

In 2016, Nordic Business Group reported revenue of €15 million, with Nordic Business Forum generating €6.13m of the total.

Nordic Business Forum reported revenues of €7.39 million in 2017.

In March 2018, Finnish marketing executive Aslak de Silva took over as CEO of Nordic Business Forum from co-founder Hans-Peter Siefen, who remains active with the company as the chairman of the board.

In February 2022, Aslak de Silva left the company, and Nordic Business Forum partner and long time employer, Priit Liiv, stepped in as the interim managing director. A few months later, Priit Liiv was named CEO.

== Awards and recognitions ==
- Central Finland Marketing Deed Award 2011
- ICT Product of the Year 2014
- Evento Company Event of the Year 2016
- National Entrepreneur Award by the Federation of Finnish Enterprises in 2018

== Event descriptions ==
=== Nordic Business Forum ===
The company’s signature event is the Nordic Business Forum held annually in Helsinki, Finland since 2010. The 2018 event attracted more than 7,500 visitors and featured former US President Barack Obama as the main keynote speaker.

=== Nordic Business Forum Sweden ===
Held in Stockholm since 2016, Nordic Business Forum Sweden mirrors the format of the Helsinki event but is smaller in scale. In 2018, the one-day event attracted around 1,000 attendees from 19 different countries.

=== Nordic Business Forum Norway ===
Held for the first time in 2018, the Nordic Business Forum Norway takes place in Oslo and largely replicates the event held in Stockholm. The inaugural event attracted nearly 550 attendees.

=== Speaker Contest ===
Ahead of the 2018 Nordic Business Forum in Helsinki, the organization launched its first Speaker Contest. More than 170 people applied, from which 24 candidates were chosen to speak at qualifying rounds held in Helsinki, Oslo, and Stockholm.

Eight finalists were then invited back to Stockholm in August 2018, from which one speaker was chosen by a jury of audience members and Nordic Business Forum representatives. The winner, James Hewitt, was added to Nordic Business Forum 2018 speaker lineup and received a €30,000 speaking fee for the engagement.

== Event archive ==
=== Nordic Business Forum 2011: Strength from Responsible Choices ===
Nordic Business Forum 2011 concentrated on responsibility. The main topic was Strength from Responsible Choices and all the 1800 seats were sold out. The main speaker was the former Vice President of U.S. Al Gore.

=== Nordic Business Forum 2012: Growth ===
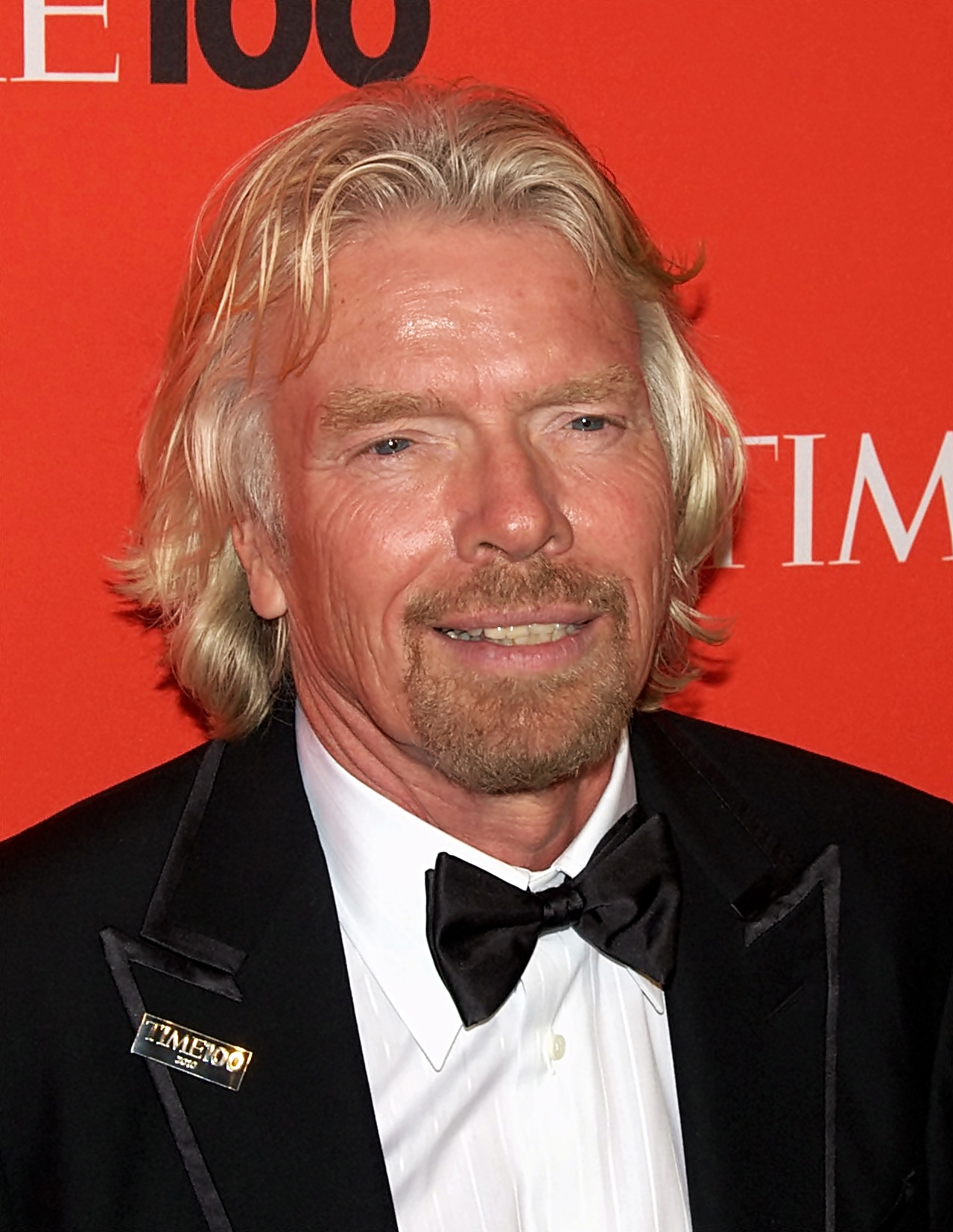
Richard Branson

In 2012 the main theme of Nordic Business Forum was growth, with sub-themes business growth, personal growth and growth of well-being.

The speakers included:

- Richard Branson
- Brian Tracy
- Daniel Pink
- Hans Rosling
- Peter Vesterbacka
- Taneli Tikka
- Jari Sarasvuo
- Anne Berner
- Esa Saarinen

=== Nordic Business Forum 2013: Leadership ===
Nordic Business Forum 2013 gathered over 3,300 guests under one roof. The seminar was sold out already by the end of February 2012, 7 months prior to the actual event date.

The main theme of Nordic Business Forum 2013 was Leadership. Sub-topics included self-leadership, sales leadership and innovation leadership.

The speakers included:

- Jack Welch
- Tom Peters
- Jimmy Wales
- Malcolm Gladwell
- Lynda Gratton
- Vijay Govindarajan
- Alexander Stubb
- Alf Rehn
- Jari Sarasvuo
- Petri Parvinen
- Henkka Hyppönen

=== Nordic Business Forum 2014: Forward ===
Nordic Business Forum 2014 gathered over 5,300 guests to the Exhibition & Convention Center in Helsinki. This was the first time the seminar was organized in Helsinki. The seminar was sold out already 4 months prior to the event. In addition to the attendees on the spot, there were also hundreds of people watching the seminar through live stream.

The main theme of Nordic Business Forum 2014 was Forward. Sub-topics included Choosing Excellence, Building the Future and Growing with Purpose.

The speakers included:

- James C. Collins
- Arnold Schwarzenegger
- Alex Ferguson
- Dambisa Moyo
- Ken Robinson
- Matti Alahuhta
- Tony Fernandes
- Soulaima Gourani

=== Nordic Business Forum 2015: Impact ===
The Nordic Business Forum 2015 is held 1–2 October, in the Helsinki Exhibition and Convention Center, in Finland.

The speakers include:

- Ben Bernanke
- Arianna Huffington
- Simon Sinek
- Guy Kawasaki
- Keith J. Cunningham
- Garry Kasparov
- Nilofer Merchant
- John C. Maxwell

=== Nordic Business Forum 2016: Advantage ===
Nordic Business Forum 2016 was held on 6 and 7 October and focused on the theme advantage. In addition to the 5,700 conference attendees, around 10,000 people watched the event via the live stream broadcast.

Speakers included:

- Ed Catmull
- Amy Chua
- Dick Costolo
- Peter Diamandis
- Scott Galloway
- Seth Godin
- Tony Hawk
- Jessica Jackley
- Vinad Nayar
- Des Traynor
- Gary Vaynerchuk

=== Nordic Business Forum Sweden 2017 – The Future of Leading People and Growth ===
The first Nordic Business Forum Sweden took place on 16 January at the Stockholm Waterfront Conference Centre. The event attracted nearly 1,000 attendees from 19 countries.

Speakers included:

- Linda Liukas
- Kjell A. Nordström
- Sheila Heen
- Chip Conley
- Ida Backlund
- Chad Hurley
- Andre Agassi

=== Nordic Business Forum 2017 – Responsibility, Purpose, and Leadership ===
Nordic Business Forum 2017 was attended by 7,500 guests from more than 40 countries. In addition, the live stream broadcast was viewed by 15,000 people.

Speakers included:

- Will Smith
- Richard Branson
- Adam Grant
- Rachel Botsman
- Patrick Lencioni
- James Hansen
- Severn Cullis-Suzuki
- Nick Vujicic
- Stéphane Garelli
- Petteri Taalas
- Mika Anttonen
- Boyan Slat
- Selina Juul
- Richard Quest

=== Nordic Business Forum Norway 2018 – Lead Lean ===
The first Nordic Business Forum Norway took place on 22 January in Oslo. The event attracted nearly 550 attendees.

Speakers included:

- Eric Ries
- Seth Godin
- Alex Osterwalder
- Dan Toma
- Anita Krohn Traaseth
- Hans-Petter Nygård Hansen
- Sabinije von Gaffke
- Alf Rehn

=== Nordic Business Forum Sweden 2018 – Lead Lean ===
Nordic Business Forum Sweden 2018 took place on 24 January in Stockholm. The event attracted nearly 1,000 attendees from 19 countries.

Speakers included:

- Eric Ries
- Steve Wozniak
- Seth Godin
- Anita Krohn Traaseth
- Lena Apler
- Cheri Tree

=== Nordic Business Forum 2018 – Strategy, Peak Performance and Artificial Intelligence ===
Nordic Business Forum 2018 was held at the Helsinki Expo & Convention Center on 26 and 27 September, attracting 7,500 attendees from more than 40 countries. The live stream was viewed by approximately 20,000 people, with an additional 20,000 watching a free broadcast of President Barack Obama’s conversation with Niklas Zennström.

Speakers included:

- President Barack Obama
- Marcus Buckingham
- Steven Kotler
- Andrew McAfee
- Don Tapscott
- Susan Cain
- Gary Hamel
- Aswath Damodaran
- John Mackey
- Amy Cuddy
- James Hewitt
- Niklas Zennström
- Sheila Heen

=== Nordic Business Forum Sweden 2019 – Leadership and Marketing ===
Nordic Business Forum Sweden 2019 will take place on 7 May in Stockholm.

Scheduled speakers include:

- Simon Sinek
- Ryan Holiday
- Sahar Hashemi
- Isabella Löwengrip

=== Nordic Business Forum Norway 2019 – Leadership and Marketing ===
Nordic Business Forum Norway 2019 will take place on 9 May in Oslo.

Scheduled speakers include:

- Simon Sinek
- Sahar Hashemi
- Isabella Löwengrip
- Morten Hansen
- Avinash Kaushik
- Camilla Hessellund Lastein

=== Nordic Business Forum 2019 – Growth ===
The tenth Nordic Business Forum will be held at the Helsinki Expo & Convention Center on 9 and 10 October.

Scheduled speakers include:

- George Clooney
- Randi Zuckerberg
- Steve Wozniak
- Brené Brown
- Daniel Pink
- Sara Blakely
- Alex Osterwalder
- Anssi Rantanen
- Donald Miller
- Juliet Funt
- Costas Markides
- Carla Harris

=== Nordic Business Forum 2022 – Future-Focused Leadership ===
The eleventh Nordic Business Forum was held in Helsinki, Finland on 20 & 21 September.

Scheduled speakers include:

- Yuval Noah Harari
- Amy Edmondson
- Rutger Bregman
- Erin Meyer
- Joseph Stiglitz
- Jitske Kramer
- Martin Lindstrom
- Zoe Chance
- Petter Stordalen
- Duncan Wardle
- Kristel Kruustuk
- Miki Kuusi

=== Nordic Business Forum 2023 – Be: Change ===
The twelfth Nordic Business Forum is scheduled was held on 27 and 28 of September in Messukeskus, Helsinki, where speakers include Malala Yousafzai and Tim Ferriss.

Other scheduled speakers of Nordic Business Forum 2023:

- Patrick Lencioni
- Rebecca Henderson
- Nicolai Tangen
- Amy Webb
- Scott Galloway (professor)
- Mikko Hyppönen
- Mo Gawdat
- Sheena Iyengar
- Jos de Blok
- Maryna Saprykina

=== Nordic Business Forum 2024 – Courageous Leadership ===
The thirteenth Nordic Business Forum was held on 25 and 26 of September in Messukeskus, Helsinki, where speakers include Brené Brown, Adam Grant, Mario Draghi, and Bozoma Saint John.

Other scheduled speakers of Nordic Business Forum 2024:

- Christopher Voss
- Liz Wiseman
- Will Guidara
- Morten Hansen
- Björn Wahlroos
- Kim Scott
- Steven van Belleghem
- Sanna Suvanto-Harsaae

=== Nordic Business Forum 2025 – Moving Forward ===
The thirteenth Nordic Business Forum was held on 24 and 25 of September in Messukeskus, Helsinki, where speakers include Simon Sinek, Rick Rubin, and Angela Ahrendts.

Other scheduled speakers of Nordic Business Forum 2025:

- Jonah Berger
- Risto Siilasmaa
- Howard Yu
- Peter Hinssen
- Milda Mitkute
- Gianpiero Petriglieri
- April Rinne
- Sukhinder Singh Cassidy
- Diana Kander

=== Nordic Business Forum 2026 – The Human Edge ===
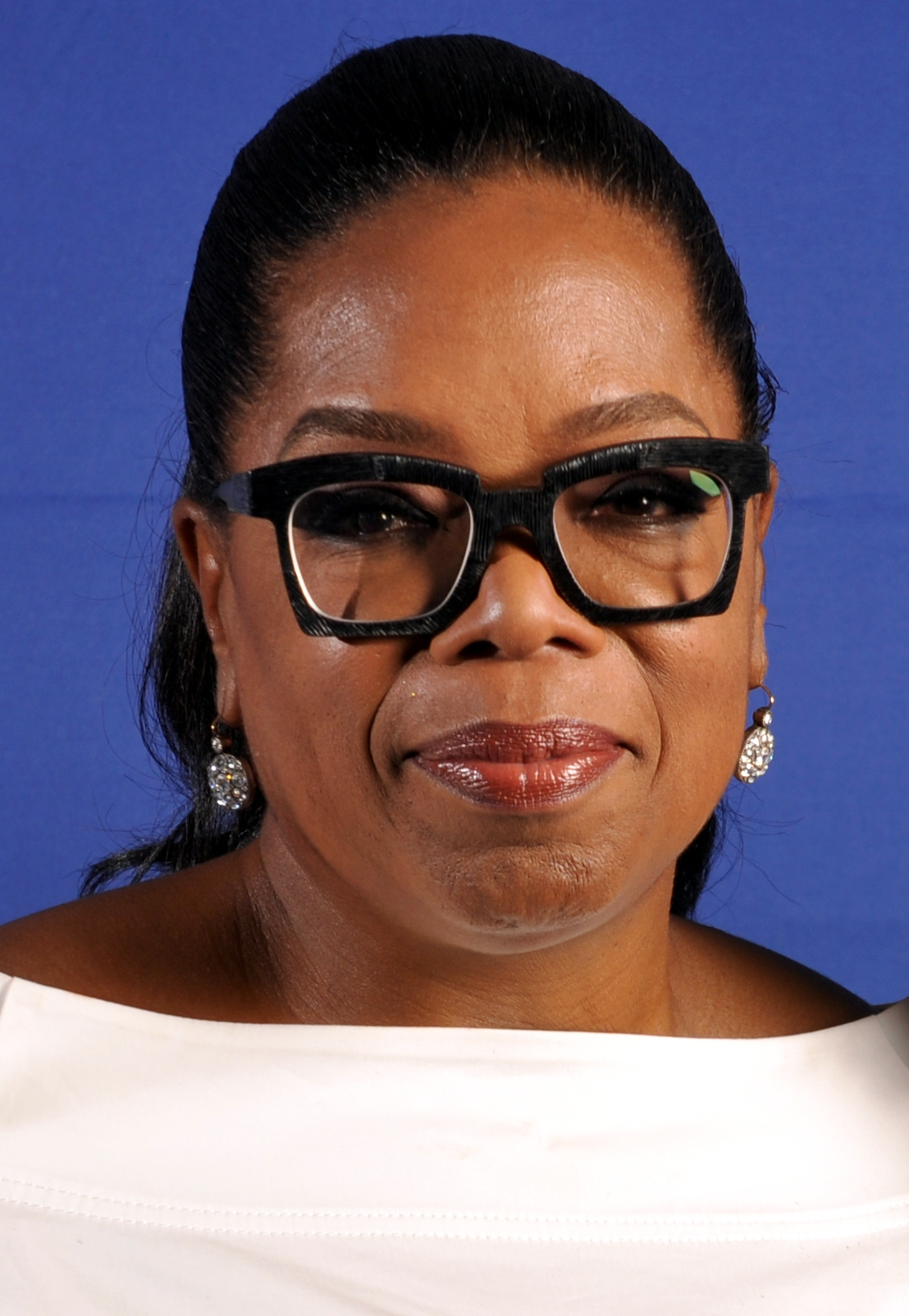
Oprah Winfrey

The fourteenth Nordic Business Forum is scheduled to be held on 16 and 17 of September in Messukeskus, Helsinki, where speakers include Oprah Winfrey, Steven Bartlett (businessman), and Angela Duckworth.

Other scheduled speakers of Nordic Business Forum 2025:

- Paul Polman
- Patty McCord
- Kjell A. Nordström
- Michael Beckley (political scientist)
- Rahaf Harfoush
