= Daniel Olin (TV program) =

Finland Swedish television talk show

- Swedish: Daniel Olin
- Presented by: Daniel Olin
- Country of origin: Finland
- Original language: Swedish
- No. of seasons: 4
- No. of episodes: 68

Production
- Production company: Yle

Original release
- Network: Yle
- Release: April 6, 2019 – April 17, 2022

Daniel Olin, is a Finland Swedish talk show produced and broadcast by Finland's national public broadcast company Yle from 2019 to 2022. In the talk show, the host Daniel Olin is visited by a well-known and socially significant person. The conversation focuses on the guest's life, career and personal experiences. The first program was broadcast on 6 April 2019 and the last on 17 April 2022.

The program was nominated for a Golden Venla (in Finnish Kultainen Venla) for best talk show in 2019.

== Episodes ==
| Season | Episode | Guest | Publication date |
|---|---|---|---|
| 1 | 1 | Sixten Korkman | 2019-04-06 |
| 1 | 2 | Sophia Jansson | 2019-04-13 |
| 1 | 3 | Satu Huber | 2019-04-20 |
| 1 | 4 | Martin Scheinin | 2019-04-27 |
| 1 | 5 | Sture Udd | 2019-05-04 |
| 1 | 6 | Kaj Kunnas | 2019-05-11 |
| 1 | 7 | Tua Forsström | 2019-05-18 |
| 1 | 8 | Mirjam Kalland | 2019-06-01 |
| 1 | 9 | Christoffer Strandberg | 2019-06-08 |
| 1 | 10 | Christoffer Taxell | 2019-06-15 |
| 1 | 11 | Thomas Elfgren | 2019-10-12 |
| 1 | 12 | Alf Rehn | 2019-10-19 |
| 1 | 13 | Elisabeth Rehn | 2019-10-26 |
| 1 | 14 | Heidi Avellan | 2019-11-02 |
| 1 | 15 | Anders Wiklöf | 2019-11-09 |
| 1 | 16 | Sören Lillkung | 2019-11-16 |
| 1 | 17 | Maria Turtschaninoff | 2019-11-23 |
| 1 | 18 | Anna-Maria Helsing | 2019-11-30 |
| 1 | 19 | Anna-Maja Henriksson | 2019-12-07 |
| 1 | 20 | Pekka Lundmark | 2019-12-14 |
| 2 | 1 | Pär Stenbäck | 2020-02-29 |
| 2 | 2 | René Nyberg | 2020-03-07 |
| 2 | 3 | Moira von Wright | 2020-03-14 |
| 2 | 4 | Jannica Fagerholm | 2020-03-21 |
| 2 | 5 | Jan Vapaavuori | 2020-03-28 |
| 2 | 6 | Peter Vesterbacka | 2020-04-04 |
| 2 | 7 | Björn Vikström | 2020-04-11 |
| 2 | 8 | Alma Pöysti | 2020-04-25 |
| 2 | 9 | Marcus Rosenlund | 2020-05-02 |
| 2 | 10 | Kjell Westö | 2020-05-09 |
| 2 | 11 | Carl Haglund | 2020-05-16 |
| 2 | 12 | Linda Sällström | 2020-05-23 |
| 2 | 13 | Henrik Meinander | 2020-10-11 |
| 2 | 14 | Mikael Backman | 2020-10-18 |
| 2 | 15 | Ann-Luise Bertell | 2020-10-25 |
| 2 | 16 | Mårten Mickos | 2020-11-01 |
| 2 | 17 | Heidi Hautala | 2020-11-08 |
| 2 | 18 | Peter Strang | 2020-11-15 |
| 2 | 19 | Mika Salminen | 2020-11-22 |
| 2 | 20 | Jan Mosander | 2020-11-29 |
| 2 | 21 | Stina Ekblad | 2020-12-13 |
| 3 | 1 | Jutta Zilliacus | 2021-03-07 |
| 3 | 2 | Erja Yläjärvi | 2021-03-14 |
| 3 | 3 | Casper von Koskull | 2021-03-21 |
| 3 | 4 | John Webster | 2021-03-28 |
| 3 | 5 | Tapani Ritamäki | 2021-04-04 |
| 3 | 6 | Krister Höckerstedt | 2021-04-11 |
| 3 | 7 | Gideon Bolotowsky | 2021-04-25 |
| 3 | 8 | Nina Kopola | 2021-05-02 |
| 3 | 9 | Cecilia Sahlgren | 2021-05-09 |
| 3 | 10 | Merete Mazzarella | 2021-05-16 |
| 3 | 11 | Asko Järvinen | 2021-05-23 |
| 3 | 12 | Björn Wahlroos | 2021-11-07 |
| 3 | 13 | Arja Saijonmaa | 2021-11-14 |
| 3 | 14 | Annica Bresky | 2021-11-21 |
| 3 | 15 | Tim Sparv | 2021-11-28 |
| 3 | 16 | Ralf Friberg | 2021-12-05 |
| 3 | 17 | Bengt Ahlfors | 2021-12-12 |
| 3 | 18 | Risto E. J. Penttilä | 2021-12-19 |
| 4 | 1 | Klaus Törnudd | 2022-02-06 |
| 4 | 2 | Ole Norrback | 2022-02-13 |
| 4 | 3 | Gunvor Kronman | 2022-02-20 |
| 4 | 4 | Juhana Vartiainen | 2022-02-27 |
| 4 | 5 | Sam Huber | 2022-03-06 |
| 4 | 6 | Kerstin Kronvall | 2022-03-13 |
| 4 | 7 | Nils Torvalds | 2022-04-03 |
| 4 | 8 | Erik Bonsdorff | 2022-04-10 |
| 4 | 9 | Petra Theman | 2022-04-17 |
