= Mosander =

Mosander is a Swedish surname. Notable people with the surname include:

- Carl Gustaf Mosander (1797–1858), Swedish chemist
- Jan Mosander (born 1944), Swedish journalist and author
- Ingalill Mosander (born 1943), Swedish journalist, wife of Jan
