= Rissanen =

Rissanen is a Finnish surname. Notable people with the surname include:

- Taavi Rissanen (1864–1934), Finnish schoolteacher and politician
- Oskari Rissanen (1893–1957), Finnish track and field athlete
- Antti Rissanen (born 1931), Finnish sport shooter
- Jorma Rissanen (1932–2020), information theorist
- Kari Rissanen (1966–present), Finnish former footballers
- Mika Rissanen (born 1978), Finnish history researcher and author
- Jaakko Rissanen, Finnish ice hockey player
- Rasmus Rissanen (born 1991), Finnish ice hockey player
