= Poutanen =

Poutanen is a surname. Notable people with the surname include:

- Elias Poutanen, Australian-born Finnish host/computer-game critic
- Kira Poutanen (born 1974), Finnish writer, translator and actress
- Reino Poutanen (1928–2007), Finnish rower

== See also ==
- Meanings of minor planet names: 3001–4000#760
