= Skepsis ry =

Finnish skeptical organization

Skepsis
- Founded: 1987
- Type: Scientific non-profit organization
- Purpose: Skepticism, public understanding of science
- Location: Helsinki, Finland
- Method: Education, outreach, and advocacy
- Members: 1,800
- Chair: Otto Mäkelä
- Website: skepsis.fi

Skepsis is a scientific skepticism organization of Finland founded in 1987.

== Purpose ==
Its mission is to promote objective, impartial and critical investigation of paranormal claims and pseudoscience. Skepsis organizes public lectures and publishes articles and books related to skepticism, including a quarterly magazine Skeptikko. Skepsis works in collaboration with other scientific skepticism organizations and is a member of the European Council of Skeptical Organisations (ECSO). Skepsis is known for its annual Huuhaa ("humbug") Prize which is awarded to a person or an organization that has diligently promoted pseudo- or fringe science, and for its Socrates Prize which is awarded for work promoting Socratic, rational thinking. Skepsis also offers a prize of €10,000, sponsored by the astronomer Hannu Karttunen and the magician Iiro Seppänen, to anybody in Finland who can produce paranormal phenomena under satisfactory observing conditions. The same sum is also offered as an ET scholarship to anyone who can prove that she/he/it is an extraterrestrial by providing a DNA (or equivalent) sample for investigation.

== Huuhaa Prize ==
The Huuhaa Prize has been given annually by Skepsis since 1989 to a person or an organization who has actively promoted pseudoscience. The recipients since 2004 are the following:

- 2004: Helsinki University of Technology's (nowadays Aalto University) Bioprocess Engineering Laboratory for presenting creationism as a natural science seminar
- 2005: The folk high school of Varsinais-Suomi for including pseudoscientific topics in its curriculum
- 2006: All those pharmacies and pharmacy organizations who promote the sales of homeopathic products and offer them as alternatives for science-based medicine
- 2007: Suomen Kinesiologiayhdistys (a Finnish kinesiology association) for successfully promoting applied kinesiology
- 2008: Publisher Uusi Tie for promulgating pseudoscience by publishing books by Finnish intelligent design supporter Tapio Puolimatka
- 2009: Rokotusinfo for promoting one-sided and pseudoscientific claims on vaccines
- 2010: The Power Balance bracelet and its Finnish importers and retailers
- 2011: Kärkkäinen retail store for publishing the free weekly newspaper Magneettimedia that promotes pseudoscience and conspiracy theories
- 2012: Valkee Oy (a Finnish company) for successfully marketing a poorly researched bright light headset which they claim cures a multitude of symptoms such as jet lag, migraine and seasonal affective disorder
- 2013: GMO-Vapaa Suomi, a non-governmental organization promoting the ban of GMO crops from Finland. The price was given for twisting scientific knowledge and their fear-mongering style of discussion.
- 2014: Suomen Terveysjärjestö for divulging misleading information about health issues such as nutrition, vaccination and homeopathy

== Socrates Prize ==
The group's Socrates Prize is given annually to a person or an organization who has actively promoted rational thinking or public understanding of science. Recipients include:

- 2007: Docent Marjaana Lindeman and her research team for promoting critical thinking
- 2008: Journalist Kirsi Virtanen for promoting critical thinking in her radio programs
- 2009: Academy professor Kari Enqvist for promoting the public understanding of science
- 2010: Professor, astronomer and author Esko Valtaoja for meritorious promotion of a scientific worldview

== Chairs ==
- Ville Aarnikko 2024-
- Denis Galkin 2020-2021
- Otto Mäkelä 2013–2019, 2022-2023
- Pertti Laine 2008–2012
- Matias Aunola 2004–2007
- Jukka Häkkinen 1999–2003
- Ilpo V. Salmi 1995–1998
- Veli Toukomies 1994
- Lauri Gröhn 1993
- Nils Mustelin 1989–1992
- S. Albert Kivinen 1987–1989
