= Ingalill =

Ingalill is a Nordic feminine given name. Notable people with the name include:

- Ingalill Mosander (born 1943), Swedish journalist
- Ingalill Olsen (born 1955), Norwegian politician
