= Pelo =

Pelo may refer to:

== Surname ==
- Brad Pelo (born 1963), American businessman
- Dimitri Pelo (born 1985), French rugby league player
- Riikka Pelo (born 1972), Finnish writer
- Vincent Pelo (born 1988), French rugby union player

== Given name ==
- Pelo Madueño (born 1968), Peruvian musician and actor

== Other uses ==
- PELO, a protein
