= Kreetta Onkeli =

Finnish writer

Kreetta Onkeli (born 1970, Jyväskylä, Finland) is a Finnish writer. Her breakthrough novel Ilonen talo (A Happy House) was published in 1996, and it received the Kalevi Jäntti award. After that she did not publish any books for seven years. Then she published short stories, columns, and three more novels, and since 2013 she has published two books for children. One of them received the Finlandia Junior Award.

Before publishing her first novel, she was studying dramaturgy at the Helsinki Theatre Academy, but she dropped out to become a freelance writer. In 2016 she enrolled in nursing school.

Her first novel, Ilonen talo, is partly autobiographical, and it tells about the writer's mother, who was an alcoholic.
