= Siri Kolu =

Finnish author and playwright

Siri Kolu (born 18 July 1972 in Kouvola) is a Finnish writer and playwright, best known for her novel Me Rosvolat (2010), which won her a Finlandia Junior Award and was subsequently adapted into a film in 2015. The book 'Me and the Robbersons' (in Finnish 'Me Rosvolat) is part of a children's bookserie. Kolu won several prizes such as the Finlandia Junior Award, the Laivakello Prize and the Zilveren Griffel in the Netherlands.

The bookseries contains 8 books:

- Me Rosvolat (2010)

- Me Rosvolat ja konnakaraoke (2011)

- Me Rosvolat ja iso-Hemmin arkku (2012)

- Me Rosvolat ja vaakunaväijy (2013)

- Me Rosvolat ja ryöväriliitto (2014)

- Karkkikumous! (2016)

- Tariataistelu

- Me Rosvolat ja nolo fani (2023)
