= Juha Kärkkäinen =

Finnish businessman and publisher

Juha Matti Kärkkäinen (born 31 March 1967) is a Finnish businessman and publisher who owns the Kärkkäinen chain of stores. In addition to this, he publishes the KauppaSuomi free-distribution magazine. In 2013, he was found guilty of incitement against an ethnic group for his antisemitic writings. He is also a supporter of the neo-Nazi Nordic Resistance Movement and the neo-fascist Blue-and-Black Movement.

== Life and career ==
Kärkkäinen, born into a farming family in Kiuruvesi, started his business career in 1988 as a travelling merchant. He opened his first store in Ylivieska in 1991. Today, Kärkkäinen Oy is the fourth largest discount store chain in Finland. In addition, Kärkkäinen owns restaurants, car service centres, a real estate development company and free-distribution magazine. Kärkkäinen acts as an investor. His investment partners include the former prime minister Juha Sipilä.

== Views ==
Helsingin Sanomat described Kärkkäinen's view as "extreme right". He was radicalized in the United States, and once he returned to Finland he founded the Magneettimedia newspaper whose editor-in-chief he was. Later, he began to work together with neo-nazis.

In 2013, Kärkkäinen was sentenced to a fine for incitement against an ethnic group due to anti-Jewish writings published in Magneettimedia. At the Rovaniemi Court of Appeal, Kärkkäinen's witness was Juuso Tahvanainen, the leader of the Finnish resistance movement at the time. With the verdict, Kärkkäinen gave up Magneettimedia and founded a new KauppaSuomi free distribution magazine instead, which has also published anti-Jewish articles. Magneettimedia continued as an online publication, and in 2015 Kärkkäinen handed over its rights to the Finnish resistance movement. Due to the verdict, Kärkkäinen also resigned from his company's CEO position for four months, but returned again in October 2013 after the new CEO fired himself. In January 2017, it was revealed that Kärkkäinen had delivered products from different manufacturers for sale to the online store of the Finnish resistance movement.

Kärkkäinen's department stores have sold the well-known propaganda book Jewish supremacism by the American anti-Semite and supporter of white supremacy David Duke. Israel's ambassador to Finland and the American Simon Wiesenthal Center, which studies anti-Semitism, have also taken a stand on the anti-Jewish texts published by Kärkkäinen, who demanded a statement from the President of the Republic of Finland, Sauli Niinistö.

In 2021, Kärkkäinen urged his department store employees in an internal email not to take the coronavirus vaccine. The same year, he also publicly denied the Holocaust and claimed that President of Finland Sauli Niinistö was affiliated with the New World Order.

== Awards ==
In 2014, the city of Ylivieska awarded Kärkkäinen for his merits with the Pro Ylivieska medal.
