= Magneettimedia =

Finnish free and online newspaper

- Type: Online newspaper
- Publisher: Pohjoinen Perinne
- Editor-in-chief: Markku Juutinen
- Language: Finnish
- Country: Finland

Magneettimedia is a Finnish free and online newspaper. It was initially published by retail chain J. Kärkkäinen but currently it is published by Pohjoinen Perinne, a society linked with the Finnish Resistance Movement, a pan-Nordic Neo-Nazi movement.

== Controversies ==
In 2011 Skepsis ry, a society of Finnish sceptics, awarded J. Kärkkäinen a Huuhaa Prize, a prize for promoting pseudo-science, for publishing Magneettimedia. Skepsis accused Magneettimedia of promoting alternative medicine and conspiracy theories.

In 2013, the Simon Wiesenthal Centre asked President Niinistö to condemn Magneettimedia newspaper circulated to some 660,000 households. The newspaper published articles denying the Holocaust and articles such as "Zionist terrorism" and "CNN, Goldman Sachs and Zionist Control" translated from David Duke, former grand wizard of the Ku Klux Klan.

In October 2013, Magneettimedia's editor-in-chief Juha Kärkkäinen and the J. Kärkkäinen company were convicted of agitation against an ethnic group. This verdict was given due to antisemitic articles on Magneettimedia. For example, Magneettimedia has denied the Holocaust and accused Jews and Zionists of plotting to rule over the world. After the verdict, Magneettimedia ceased being published in paper form, but the company's articles were published as online newspapers. However, in April 2015 a new paper edition of Magneettimedia was published.

As of 2015, Magneettimedia did not identify its editor-in-chief, which is illegal under Finnish law.

== See also ==
- MV-media
