= Där vi en gång gått =

2006 novel by Kjell Westö

Where We Once Went
- Finnish edition cover
- Author: Kjell Westö
- Original title: Där vi en gång gått
- Language: Swedish
- Genre: Historical novel
- Publisher: Otava
- Publication date: 2006
- Publication place: Finland
- Pages: about 600

Där vi en gång gått is a novel written by Finnish author and journalist Kjell Westö, published by Otava publishers. Westö won the prestigious Finlandia Prize for it.

It is a historical novel set in Helsinki in the period from 1905 until 1944. Among its motifs is the often vain search for happiness, love and prosperity. It tells the stories of the aristocratic Lilliehjelm family, the middle-class Widing family and the poor Kajander family from Finland's independence through the Civil War and the Roaring Twenties, and ending during the Second World War.

== Main characters ==
- Lucie Lilliehjelm, rebellious society beauty
- Eccu Widing, sensitive photographer, in love with Lucie
- Allan Kajander, working-class football hero
- Cedric Lilliehjelm, Lucie's hot-tempered brother, member of the White Guard
- Ivar Grandell, controversial journalist
- Aina Gadolin, Eccu's wife
- Rurik Lilliehjelm, Lucie's conservative father
- Marie Lilliehjelm, Lucie's mother
- Sigrid Lilliehjelm, Lucie's sister, masterful tennis player
- Enok Kajander, Allan's father, member of the Red Guard
- Vivan Kajander, Allan's mother
- Jarl Widing, Eccu's father
- Atti Widing, Eccu's sick mother
- Nita Widing, Eccu's sister, later Cedric's wife
- Mandi Salin, Allan's beau
- Henning Lund, Cedric and Eccu's friend
- Henriette Hultqvist, actress, Grandell's mistress
- Olga, Lilliehjelms' housekeeper
