= Kärkkäinen (chain store) =

Finnish department store chain

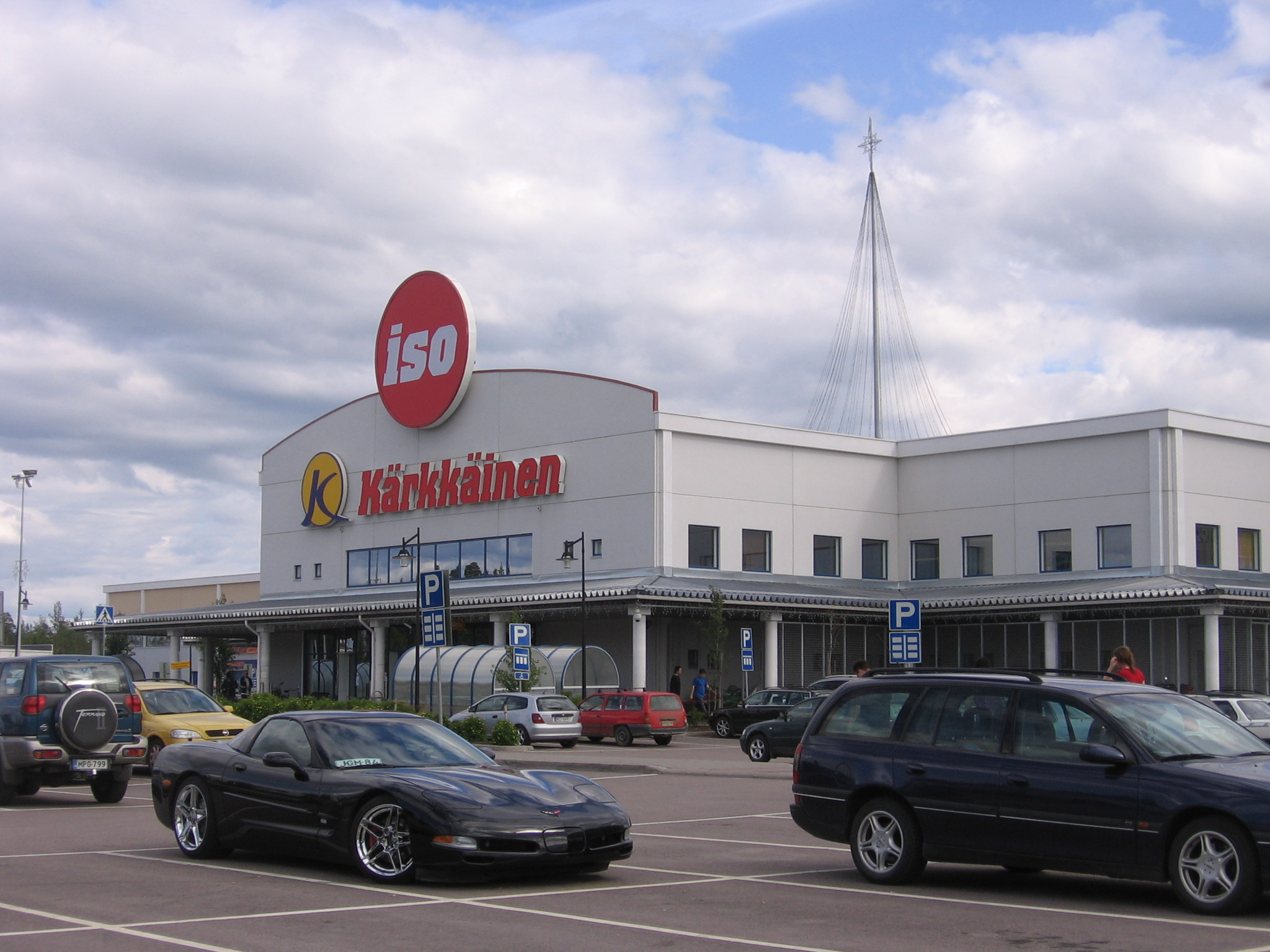
Ylivieska's Kärkkäinen store in 2007

Kärkkäinen (Finnish: [ˈkærkːæi̯nen]; formerly J. Kärkkäinen) is a department store chain in Ylivieska, Finland. It was established in 1988. In 2016, it was the fourth largest discount store chain in Finland after Tokmanni, HalpaHalli and Motonet. In addition to Ylivieska, the company has also stores in Oulu, Ii, Lahti, Jyväskylä and Seinäjoki, the company also owns an online store.

The company's founder is Juha Kärkkäinen. In 2024, Pasi Lämpsä began serving as the company’s CEO.

== History ==
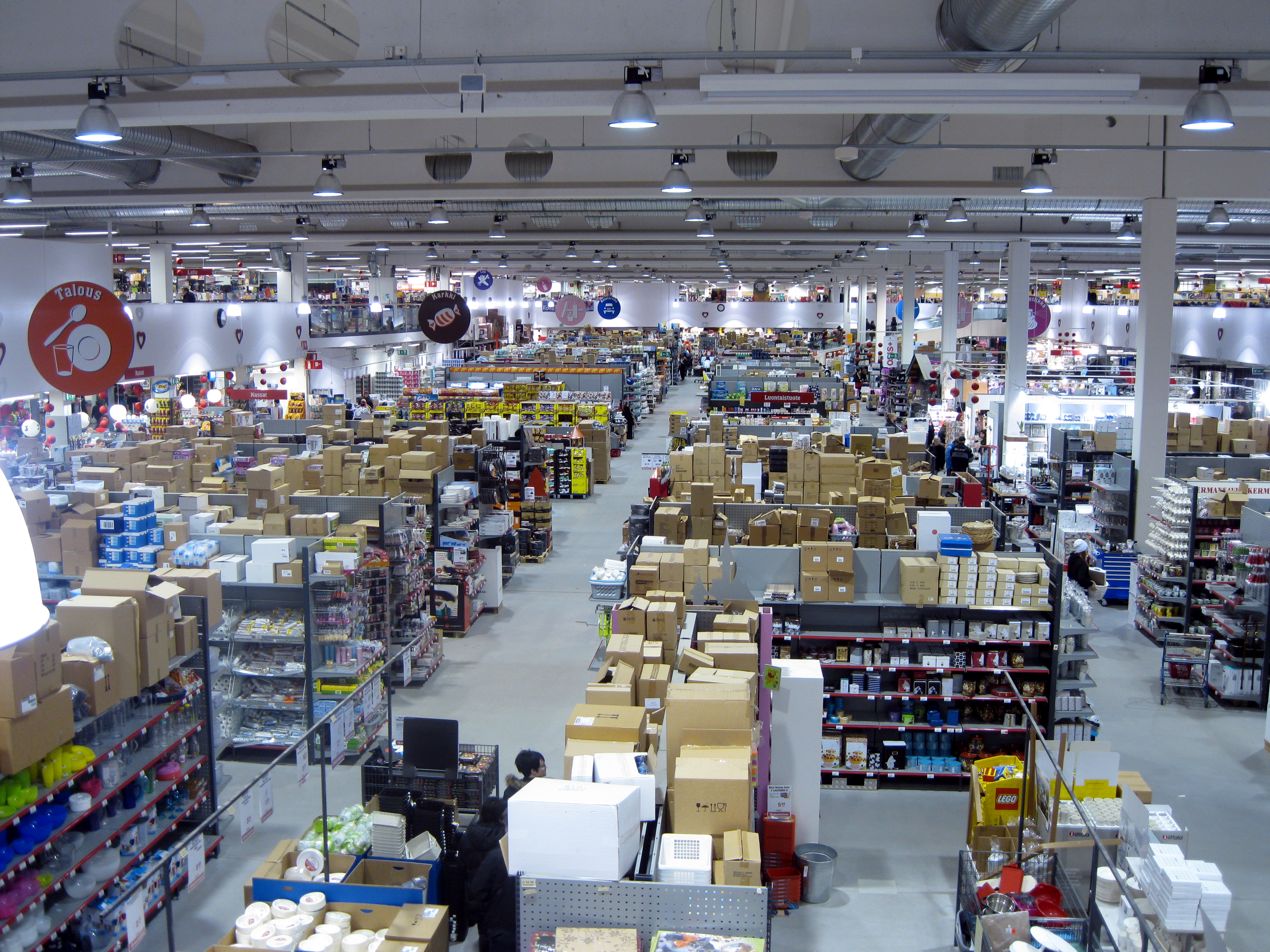
Interior of Kärkkäinen in 2014

Juha Kärkkäinen founded the company in 1988. In its early years, the company operated from a mobile shop vehicle. In 1991, the company acquired its first business premises in Ylivieska. Later, the company expanded, and today it operates a 30,000 m² department store called Iso Kärkkäinen in its founding city of Ylivieska.

In addition, the company has a 5,000 m² department store in the Limingantulli district of Oulu. In December 2007, a new 10,000 m² Kärkkäinen Express department store was opened in Ii along Highway 4. In spring 2009, a 32,000 m² department store was opened in Lahti. On April 6, 2017, a new store was opened in the Palokka Home Center in Jyväskylä.

In 2010, Kärkkäinen applied for corporate restructuring, because the company had a total of more than EUR 37 million in restructuring debt. The district court drew up a ten-year repayment program for the company. The corporate restructuring program ended in August 2020.

== Controversies ==
In 2013, the regular print publication of Magneettimedia ended, and in 2015 J. Kärkkäinen transferred its publication to the Finnish Resistance Movement. Although Juha Kärkkäinen distanced himself from Magneettimedia, as late as 2016 J. Kärkkäinen still owned the domain name www.isomagneetti.fi, which redirected to the Magneettimedia website.

In a brand valuation survey conducted by Markkinointi & Mainonta in 2018, Kärkkäinen was the least valued of the seven discount store brands. This is widely thought to be due to the controversy surrounding the company and its CEO, which stemmed from anti-Semitic articles in the company’s free newspaper distribution, including in Magneettimedia. The connections of the free newspaper distribution to the neo-Nazi organization Finnish Resistance Movement have also been detrimental to the company's reputation. Largely due to the uproar, many companies do not sell their products in Kärkkäinen's stores; Finlayson, Fiskars and Otava, among others, have terminated the cooperation.

In 2021, Juha Kärkkäinen urged his employees in an internal email not to take the coronavirus vaccine. The message was accompanied by a link to MV-media's website.
