= Hannu Väisänen =

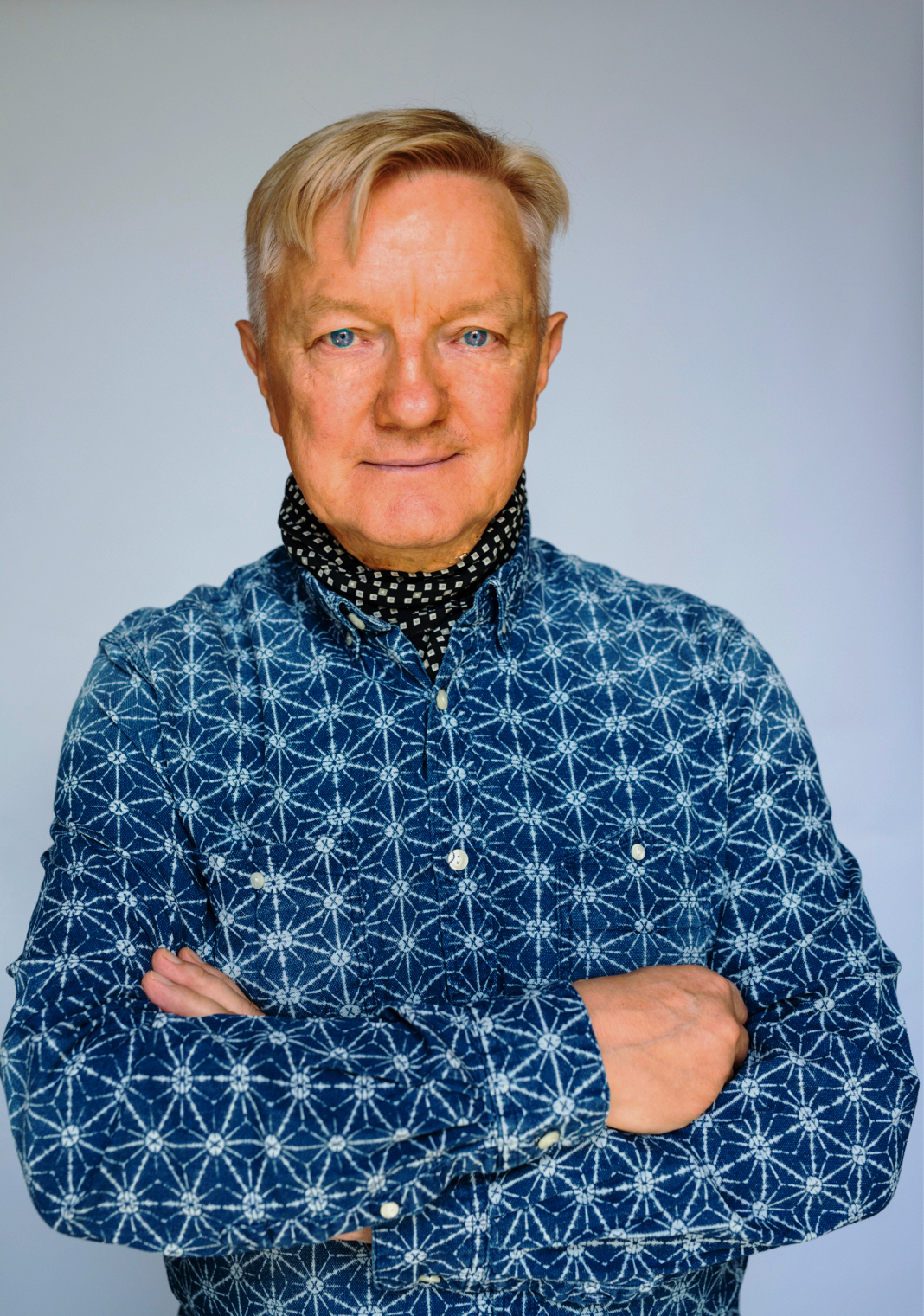

Hannu Pekka Antero Väisänen (born 2 October 1951) is a graphic artist, painter and writer from Finland. He now lives in France, and his work has been shown in numerous European countries.

As an artist he is known for his aesthetic eye.

Väisänen has written a series of partially autobiographical novels, describing the young boy Antero growing up in a garrison area in a small town in Northern Finland, leaving his home, gradually opening himself up to the world, and becoming an artist.

Väisänen received the Finlandia Prize for literature in 2007 for the second novel in the series, Other Shoes. He also won the State Prize for Visual arts in 2008 and the State Price for literature in 2015.

Väisänen has lived in France since 1989, and he also holds French citizenship.
