= Iida Rauma =

Finnish writer (born 1984)

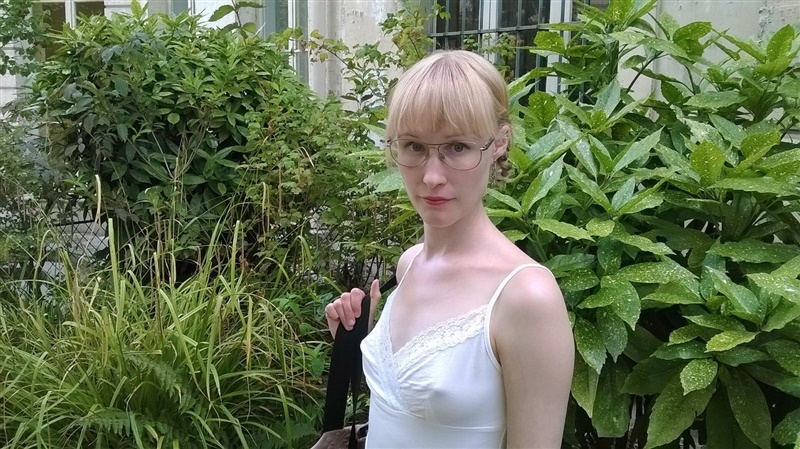
Iida Rauma

Iida Rauma (born 1984) is a Finnish writer. She studied political science at university. She has written three novels. She lives in Turku.

== Selected works ==
- The Book of Disappearances (2011), nominated for the Helsingin Sanomat Literature Prize
- Of Sex and Mathematics (2015), nominated for the EU Prize for Literature, winner of the Kalevi Jäntti Prize and the Torch-Bearer Prize.
- Destruction, winner of the Finlandia Prize, nominated for the Runeberg Prize, special mention for the EUPL
