= Little Finlandia Prize =

Literary award

- Awarded for: Outstanding essays on literature by upper secondary school students.
- Country: Finland
- Presented by: Finnish Language Teachers’ Union
- Reward: A monetary award of 1000 EUR
- First award: 1984; 42 years ago
- Website: kirjasaatio.fi/muut-palkinnot/pikku-finlandia

The Little Finlandia Prize (Finnish: Pikku-Finlandia-palkinto; Swedish: Lilla Finlandia-priset) is a Finnish literary prize which recognizes outstanding essays on Finnish and world literature written by upper secondary school students. It is administered by the Finnish Language Teachers’ Union in cooperation with the Finnish Book Foundation. The prize was first awarded in 1984.

The winner is announced annually at the Helsinki Book Fair. Each recipient receives a monetary award, a diploma, and the works nominated for the Finlandia Prize in Fiction of the year.

== Finalists and winners ==
Year	Finalist	Hometown
1984	Fredrik Hertzberg	Ekenäs
1985	Hanna Suutela	Joensuu
1986	Heikki Koistinen	Joensuu
1986	Jouni Räisänen	Joensuu
1986	Petri Räisänen	Joensuu
1987	Hanna Säntti	Laihia
1988	Samuli Saastamoinen	Helsinki
1989	Maria Santalo	Oulu
1990	Katariina Heilala	Ruukki
1991	Juha-Heikki Tihinen	Muhos
1992	Janne Suutarinen	Helsinki
1993	Matti Eräsaari	Jyväskylä
1993	Esko Vesala	Oulu
1994	Wilhelm Bargum	Helsinki
1995	Sanna Nyqvist	Helsinki
1996	Antti Hynönen	Helsinki
1997	—	
1998	Vesa Kotilainen	Turku
1999	Laura Maanavilja	Helsinki
2000	Olli Sinivaara	Tampere
2001	Petteri Kokko	Kempele
2002	Maija Ronkainen	Helsinki
2003	Harry Salmenniemi	Jyväskylä
2004	Tomi Lounio	Helsinki
2005	Viivi Kaakinen	Helsinki
2006	Sarianne Kankkunen	Helsinki
2007	Ina Mutikainen	Helsinki
2008	Harry Mäcklin	Mänttä
2009	Milka Sormunen	Helsinki
2010	Tiia Kähärä	Espoo
2011	Eeva Hiekkavuo	Helsinki
2012	Sofia Tiira	Turku
2013	Pauli Xu	Espoo
2014	Laura Jalonen	Tampere
2014	Lotta Pellas	Helsinki
2015	Emilia Laine	Helsinki
2016	Ella Holttinen	Tampere
2016	Heidi Storberg	Pori
2016	Vertti Luostarinen	Tampere
2016	Riina Niemi	Kouvola
2016	Jasmin Kuusela	Järvenpää
2016	Elisa Seppänen	Helsinki
2016	Viivi Huttunen	Oulu
2017	Siina Anttonen	Helsinki
2017	Niina Myllyniemi	Helsinki
2017	Aino Puhto	Mikkeli
2017	Hilla Ruuska	Tampere
2017	Eeva Tolonen	Helsinki
2018	Maria Bešlić	Oulu
2018	Eero Kaarsalo	Tampere
2018	Jefim Brodkin	Helsinki
2018	Juuso Huhtivuo	Vammala
2018	Kirmo Komulainen	Tampere
2018	Mona Martio	Helsinki
2018	Ruusa Tapper	Helsinki
2018	Veeti Varila	Rauma
2019	Pyry Vaismaa	Tampere
2019	Okko Hartikainen	Helsinki
2019	Arttu Jalonen	Orivesi
2019	Mairi Liukko	Helsinki
2019	Emilia Rantanen	Kuortane
2019	Adrian Sundberg	Hanko
2020	Adrian Sundberg	Hanko
2020	Milla Lahtela	Elimäki
2020	Niilo Miettinen	Helsinki
2020	Vilma Moilanen	Kuopio
2020	Selina Sarantila	Helsinki
2020	Kiisa Uusitalo	Helsinki
2020	Silma Virtanen	Tampere
2021	Elli-Amali Mäntymaa	Jyväskylä
2021	Katja Hulkkonen	Lahti
2021	Lauri Mentula	Espoo
2021	Riku Mentula	Espoo
2021	Miska Soininen	Helsinki
2021	Anna Väisänen	Tampere
2022	Tuuli Kankaansyrjä	Oulu
2022	Emil Borén	Vaasa
2022	Dea Hotanen	Helsinki
2022	Otso Keränen	Sipoo
2022	Siiri Rytilahti	Lammi
2023	Otso Miikkulainen	Helsinki
2023	Kaisla Hannuksela	Tampere
2023	Helmi Järvinen	Turku
2023	Anna Kaarina Kuivala	Turku
2023	Virva Mutikainen	Espoo
2024	Senja Ollikainen	Helsinki
2024	Taimi Immonen	Kuopio
2024	Hilkka Kuokkanen	Kuopio
2024	Kuisma Mäki	Oulu
2024	Ruusu Ropponen	Espoo
2024	Silja Salminen	Hämeenlinna
2025	Pietari Kantonen	Helsinki
