= Daniel Olin =

Finnish journalist

Daniel Olin (born in Turku, Finland) is a Finland Swedish journalist who has worked at the Finnish public broadcasting company Yle since 2005. Olin will be Svenska Yle's (English: Swedish Yle) news correspondent in the US from the beginning of August 2022. He is known as the host presenter of the talk show tv-program Daniel Olin and as a studio host for the daily TV-program TV-Nytt (English: TV news).

== Career ==
Olin grew up in Turku and graduated as a Master of Politics at Åbo Akademi University in 2008.

Olin started his career at Yle as a freelancer at Yle Sporten (English: Yle Sports). Olin worked at Yle Åboland 2004–2008 that covers news in the Turku region, and then as a news editor, studio host and producer at TV-Nytt.

Olin was a correspondent for Svenska Yle in Brussels 2015–2018.

Olin was the host of the TV discussion program Daniel Olin on Yle from 2019 to 2022. In the TV program series, he interviewed a total of 68 famous and socially significant people for 30 minutes each. The program was nominated for a Golden Venla (in Finnish Kultainen Venla) for best talk show in 2019.

From August 2022, Olin will be Svenska Yle's (English: Swedish Yle) news correspondent in the US.

Daniel Olin is married, has two children and a dog.
