= Helena Sinervo =

Finnish poet, novelist and translator (born 1961)

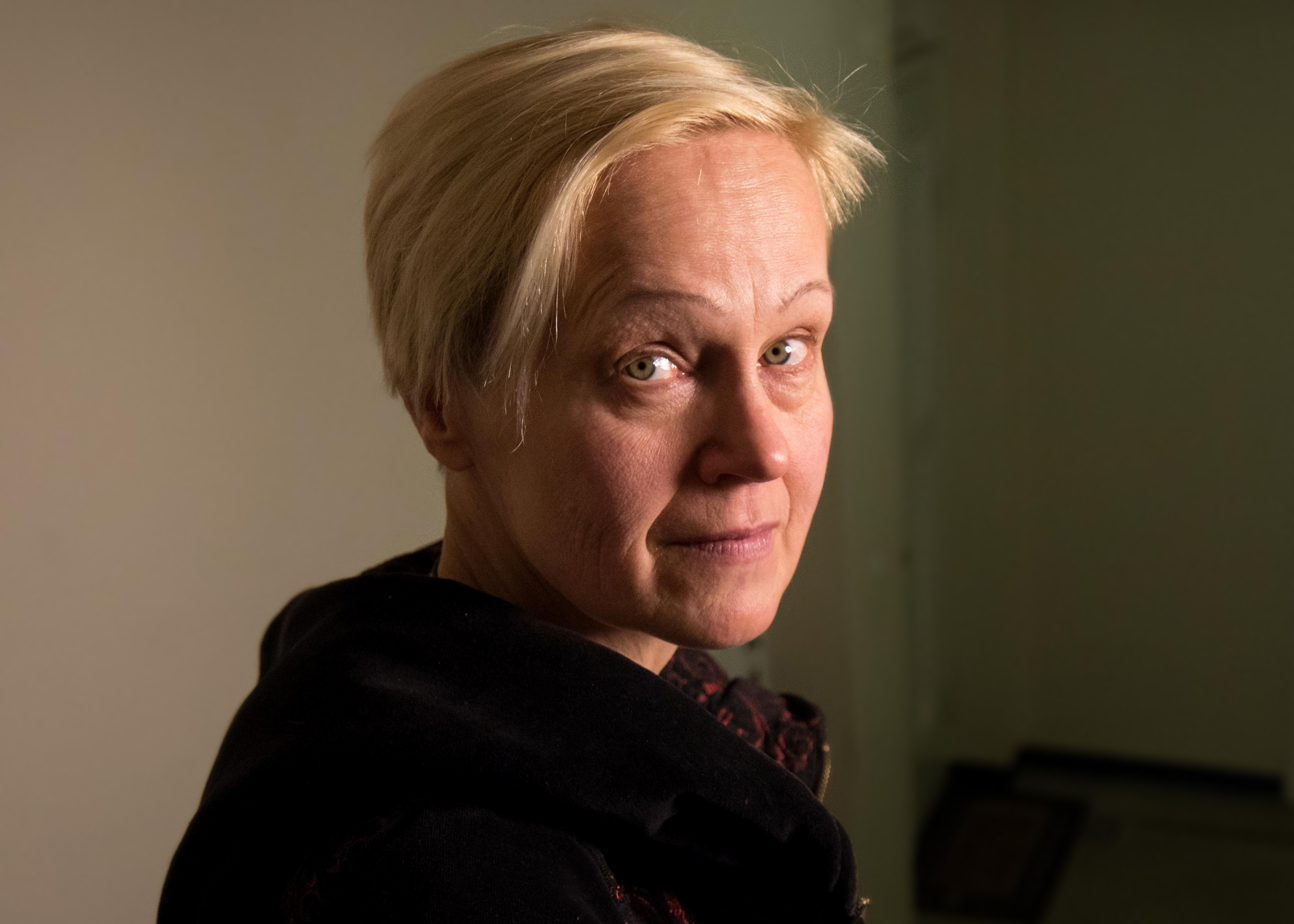
- Finnish poet, novelist and translator Helena Sinervo in 2017
- Born: 17 February 1961 (age 65); Tampere
- Known for: Finnish poet, novelist and translator
- Website: http://helenasinervo.fi/en

Helena Sinervo (born 17 February 1961) is a Finnish poet, novelist and translator. She has published three novels, eleven poetry collections and three children's books and her works has been translated into more than 25 languages. Sinervo was awarded the Finlandia Prize for Fiction in 2004.

== Life ==
Sinervo was born in the Finnish city of Tampere in 1961 and she studied the piano and music. She was at the Tampere Conservatoire where she qualified to teach piano. She obtained her doctorate at Helsinki University. She became a published poet in 1994.

Sinervo has translated poems by the American poet Elizabeth Bishop, the French poet Yves Bonnefoy, Maurice Blanchot and the symbolist poet Stéphane Mallarmé. Sinervo spent a further year studying in Paris in the 1990s.

She has written a novel based on the life of the Finnish poet Eeva-Liisa Manner who died in 1995.

She has written song lyrics for the first album by Liisa Lux in 2002.

Sinervo won the Finlandia Prize for Fiction in 2004.

== Works ==
=== Poetry collections ===
- Lukemattomiin (1994)
- Sininen Anglia (1996)
- Pimeän parit (1997)
- Ihmisen kaltainen (2000)
- Oodeja korvalle (2003)
- Tilikirja (2005)
- Täyttä ainetta (2007)
- Väärän lajin laulut (2010)
- Valitut runot (Selected Poems) (2011)
- Avaruusruusuja (2014)
- Merveli (2018)

=== Novels ===
- Runoilijan talossa (2004)
- Tykistönkadun päiväperho (2009)
- Armonranta (2016)

=== Children's books ===
- Akuvatus ja muita härveleitä & otuksia (2007)
- Prinssi Ahava ja riipuksen arvoitus (2012)
- Prinssi Ahava ja valtaistuimen salaisuus (2013)

=== Translated works ===
- Prins Sludvig og tronstolens hemmelighed (Turbino, Denmark 2016)
- Prins Sludvig og medaljonens gåde (Turbino, Denmark 2014)
- VERSschmuggel/SäkeenVERSoja: Finnisch-und deutschsprachige Gedichte (Wunderhorn/Poesia, Germany 2014)
- Gedichte aus Finnland: Poesiealbum - Sonderheft (Märkischer Verlag, Germany 2014)
- Snubblar till upprätt läge (Ellips, Finland 2014)
- Proyectos para un cielo nuevo. Poesía Nórdica Contemporánea (Práctica Mortal, México 2011)
- Trois poètes finlandais (Le Murmure Editions, France 2011)
- The Other Side of Landscape: An Anthology of Contemporary Nordic Poetry (Slope Editions, New York 2006)
- De Habla la luz con voz de corneja. Antología de poesía finlandesa actual. (Conaculta, México 2003)
- Les chaises (Club Zéro, France 2001)
