= Kari Enqvist =

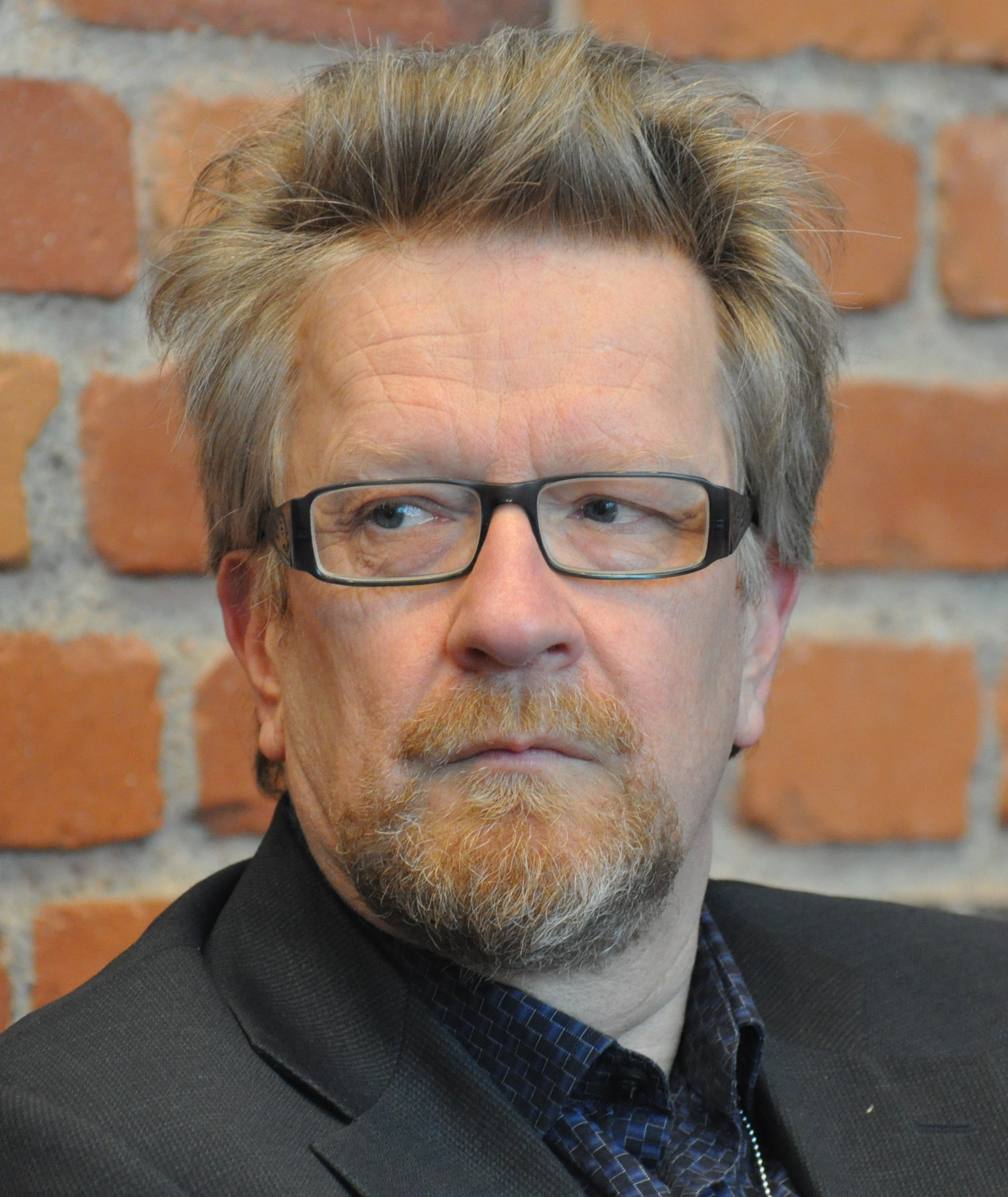
- Born: Kari-Pekka Enqvist; February 15, 1954 (age 72); Lahti, Finland
- Scientific career
- Fields: Cosmology
- Institutions: University of Helsinki

Kari-Pekka Enqvist (born February 16, 1954, in Lahti, Finland) is a professor of cosmology in the Department of Physical Sciences at the University of Helsinki. Enqvist was awarded his PhD in theoretical physics in 1983.

Enqvist is the chairman of the scientific advisory board of Skepsis ry (a Finnish sceptics' society) and has written many books that popularize physics.

In 1997 Enqvist was granted the Magnus Ehrnrooth Foundation Physics Award for his efforts in particle physics and cosmology.

In 1999, he was awarded the Tieto-Finlandia award, Finland's most significant award for non-fiction, for his book Olemisen porteilla ("At the gates of being").

Enqvist retired from the University of Helsinki in 2019.
