= Nemo Rossi =

Pen name of Mika Rissanen and Juha Tahvanainen

Nemo Rossi is the pen name of two Finnish authors, Mika Rissanen and Juha Tahvanainen.

Rossi is known for his young adult thrillers, Arkeomysteeri (Archeomystery) series. In the books, taking place either in contemporary Italy or Greece, three teenagers solve crime mysteries linked with ancient mythology and history. Rossi's novels discuss e.g. the legend of the Roman birth myth and the legacy of Alexander the Great.

== Bibliography ==
- Rooman sudet ("The Wolves of Rome"). Helsinki: WSOY. 2012. ISBN 978-951-039-159-4.
- Mafian linnut ("The Mafia Birds"). Espoo: Myllylahti. 2014. ISBN 978-952-202-498-5.
- Jumalista seuraava ("The next of Gods"). Espoo: Myllylahti. 2014. ISBN 978-952-202-547-0.
- Viimeinen etruski ("The Last Etruscan"). Espoo: Myllylahti. 2016. ISBN 978-952-202-745-0.
- Salainen veljeskunta ("The Secret Brotherhood"). Espoo: Myllylahti. 2018. ISBN 978-952-202-949-2.
