= Jacob Grandison =

Finnish-American basketball player

No. 21 – Élan Chalon
- Position: Shooting guard
- League: LNB Élite

Personal information
- Born: April 2, 1998 (age 28) San Francisco, California, U.S.
- Listed height: 6 ft 6 in (1.98 m)
- Listed weight: 190 lb (86 kg)

Career information
- High school: Berkeley (Berkeley, California); Phillips Exeter Academy (Exeter, New Hampshire)
- College: Holy Cross (2017–2019); Illinois (2020–2022); Duke (2022–2023)
- NBA draft: 2023: undrafted
- Playing career: 2021–present

Career history
- 2023–2024: Menorca
- 2024: Salon Vilpas
- 2025: PAOK Thessaloniki
- 2025–2026: Boulazac Basket Dordogne
- 2026–present: Élan Chalon

Jacob Alexander Grandison (born April 2, 1998) is a Finnish-American professional basketball player for Élan Chalon of the LNB Élite. He also represents the Finnish national team in international competition. Grandison played college basketball for the Holy Cross Crusaders, Illinois Fighting Illini, and the Duke Blue Devils.

== High school career ==
Grandison began his high school career playing for Berkeley High School. Grandison started his sophomore year on junior varsity, but he was elevated to the varsity team.

During the last two years Grandison was in Berkeley High School, he played basketball with private coaching, due to unethical environment and coaching methods in his school. Later Grandison has told in media about the situation, that it was not safe for him to play under the coach of Berkeley. When his father noted the school about those circumstances, he was threatened not to make it an issue, or else Grandison's life and health will be in danger. Since then, Grandison was escorted on his way to school, and his social life was forced to be limited.

He committed himself to continue to train with Chris Garlington at Overtime Sports Academy (CA). In May 2016, Grandison's senior year of high school, he was seen, by Team Lillard's head coach, Raymond Young, playing basketball on a non-sponsored AAU team. Coach Raym Young invited Grandison to play basketball on its Adidas sponsored AAU team supported by Oakland's very-own Damian Lillard. This experience permitted, for the first time, Division I coaches to see Grandison compete from May to July 2016, following his graduation from his public high school. During spring 2016, Grandison decided to attended a post-graduate high school year at Phillips Exeter Academy in Exeter, New Hampshire for the 2016–17 season. Grandison was named Third-team Class A All-New England Honors and led the Exonians to a NEPSAC Class A championship, where he scored 20 points in the final, championship game and was named MVP of the tournament. His success at Phillips Exeter led to Grandison being offered a Division-I scholarship to play for Holy Cross, where he ended up committing.

== College career ==
Grandison began his college career at Holy Cross, where he played in all 31 games and started 18 games his freshman year. During his first year, he averaged nine points a game and led his team in scoring six times and rebounding nine times. As a sophomore, Grandison started in all 33 games. He led the team in scoring with an average of 13.9 points per game, which was 11th in the Patriot League, and was second on the team in rebounding with five rebounds per game. Along with this, Grandison shot 36.5 percent from three with a team high of 69 three-pointers, which was eighth in the Patriot league. Some individual highlights for the season included scoring a double-double of 21 points and a career-high 10 assists against Stony Brook on November 16, 2018, a career-high of 25 points against Iona on December 30, 2018, and a double-double of 22 points and a career-high 16 rebounds against Lafayette on March 5, 2019. After two years at Holy Cross, Grandison transferred to Illinois.

After sitting out the 2019–20 season because of NCAA transfer rules, Grandison started his Illinois career as a bench player. However, after Illinois suffered consecutive losses to Maryland and Ohio State, Coach Brad Underwood decided to shake up his lineup and put Grandison in the starting lineup for their game against Penn State on January 19, 2021. This proved to be a successful change as Illinois beat the Nittany Lions 79–65, and Grandison started 15 of the final 16 games of the season. With Grandison in the lineup, Illinois moved from 22 to 2 in the AP poll and won the 2021 Big Ten men's basketball tournament. For the entire season, Grandison averaged 4.6 points and 3.4 rebounds a game. For his senior season, Grandison saw a more increased role as he started in 23 of the 30 games he played. On February 19, 2022, Grandison had his most points as an Illini with 24 points and tied a career-high in three pointers made in a game with six as he helped lead his team to a win against Michigan State 79–74. However, on March 3, 2022, Grandison sustained a shoulder injury against Penn State, which caused him to miss the last game of the regular season and the Big Ten tournament and limited his playing time in the NCAA tournament. Despite this, he averaged 9.6 points and 3.8 rebounds per game, which was fourth on the team for both, and earned an Academic All-Big Ten selection.

After graduating from Illinois, Grandison decided to use his final year of eligibility and transferred to Duke. While attending Duke, Jacob was selected to the All-ACC Academic Team.

== Professional career ==
On 16 August 2023, KK Cibona in Croatian League and ABA League announced the signing of Grandison, but the deal was eventually collapsed due to the club's financial problems.

On 27 October 2023, it was announced that Grandison had signed his first professional contract with Spanish club Menorca on a three-month deal.

On 27 February 2024, Grandison moved to Finland and signed with Salon Vilpas in Korisliiga for the rest of the 2023–24 season.

On 25 October 2024, Grandison joined the Santa Cruz Warriors of the NBA G League, but was waived three days later due to injury.

On 28 February 2025, Grandison signed with Greek club PAOK for the rest of the season, where they reached the domestic play-offs and FIBA Europe Cup finals.

On 14 September 2025, Grandison joined Boulazac Basket Dordogne in French LNB Élite.

== National team career ==
Grandison has a dual Finnish-American citizenship by birth. Grandison's Finnish citizenship permitted him to represent the Finland men's national basketball team in its summer training camp and their Olympic preparatory national team matches in 2021.

Grandison was also part of the Finland squad in World Cup preparatory games in Summer 2023. He was named in the Finland final squad in the 2023 FIBA World Cup tournament. Grandison also played in the 2024 FIBA Olympic qualifying tournament. He played for Finland at the EuroBasket 2025, where they historically reached the semi-finals and finished 4th in the tournament.

== Personal life ==
Grandison was born in San Francisco, California to a Swedish-speaking Finnish mother and an African-American father, and grew up in Oakland, California. His mother, Carina, is from Haaga, Helsinki, Finland, and she had met Grandison's father, James, in the United States, when she was a student in the U.S. He competitively swam growing up for the Oakland Undercurrents and competed in the 50 freestyle at the Junior Olympics. He graduated from the University of Illinois, Urbana-Champaign with his bachelor's (B.S.) degree in earth, society, and environmental sustainability in 2021, and graduated with his master's (M.S.) degree from the University of Illinois GIES School of Business in business management in May 2022.

Although being born and raised in the United States, Grandison visited Finland with his family during summers when he was younger. He does not speak Finnish, but understands some Swedish, which his mother spoke to him when he was a child.

Grandison's maternal grandfather was Nils Mustelin, a Finnish professor of physics and an astronomer, and a former member of the Helsinki city council.

== Career statistics ==
Legend
GP	Games played	GS	Games started	MPG	Minutes per game
FG%	Field goal percentage	3P%	3-point field goal percentage	FT%	Free throw percentage
RPG	Rebounds per game	APG	Assists per game	SPG	Steals per game
BPG	Blocks per game	PPG	Points per game	**Bold**	Career high

=== College ===
Year	Team	GP	GS	MPG	FG%	3P%	FT%	RPG	APG	SPG	BPG	PPG
2017–18	Holy Cross	31	18	27.5	.442	.317	.741	4.5	2.0	.8	.2	9.0
2018–19	Holy Cross	33	**33**	**34.6**	.429	.365	.800	**5.0**	**2.9**	**1.1**	**.3**	**13.9**
2019–20	Illinois	Redshirt										
2020–21	Illinois	30	16	15.3	**.526**	**.415**	**.957**	3.4	1.3	.5	.1	4.6
2021–22	Illinois	30	23	25.0	.455	.410	.824	3.8	2.3	.3	.2	9.6
2022–23	Duke	**34**	0	15.9	.397	.333	.889	2.1	1.4	.4	.1	4.4
Career		158	90	23.7	.442	.364	.814	3.8	2.0	.6	.2	8.3

=== National team ===
Team	Tournament	Pos.	GP	PPG	RPG	APG
Finland	2023 FIBA World Cup	21st	4	3.8	2.0	2.3
Finland	EuroBasket 2025	4th	8	4.4	2.5	1.5
