= Nils Mustelin =

Finnish professor of physics, astronomer and popular skeptic

Nils Olof Mustelin (11 August 1931 in Turku – 28 April 2004 in Helsinki) was a Finnish professor of physics, noted astronomer, and popular skeptic.

Mustelin was born in Turku, where he also went to school and attended university. He enrolled at the Åbo Akademi in 1949 and studied physics, graduating as a Ph.D. in 1963. He also studied theoretical physics for two years at MIT, the Massachusetts Institute of Technology in Cambridge, MA, USA. He worked in many places, including the University of Helsinki; Nordforsk, an institute for technological research collaboration among the Nordic countries (Finland, Sweden, Norway, Denmark, and Iceland); Tekes, Teknologian edistämiskeskus ("Center for Advancement of Technology") and COST. After retiring he was a member of the Helsinki city council, representing the Swedish People's Party.

Mustelin is known for his many scientific essays, articles, and books, primarily his astronomic book Liv Bland Miljarder Stjärnor, Civilisationer i Vintergatan och Därbortom? ("Life Among Billions of Stars, Civilizations in the Milky Way and Beyond?"). The book, published in 1978, discussed how life has emerged and evolved on Earth and how life could possibly exist on other planets and outside the Solar System. It was translated from Swedish to Finnish, Norwegian, and Danish. He is also famous for inventing tramology (Finnish sporalogia), a parody of astrology based on the scientific fact that trams exert a greater force of gravity on a city's inhabitants than planets because they are so much closer. He was the chairman of Skepsis ry, the Finnish Association of Skeptics, from 1989 to 1992.

Nils Mustelin was an expert on classical music, with vast knowledge about composers, musicians, and various facts, and could identify specific compositions by ear. For example, he memorized the entire catalog of Wolfgang Amadeus Mozart's work and could name the Köchel number of any of Mozart's compositions. Mustelin often appeared on TV and radio in various panels and competitions related to classical music, physics, mathematics, and astronomy.

Nils Mustelin had four children: Tomas Mikael (1960), Tove Carina (1962), and Tor Niklas (1966), all three with Nina Estelle Mustelin, born Costiander. He had a fourth child, Linda Marina Mustelin with his second wife, Eeva-Riitta Mustelin, née Kurki.

Nils Mustelin died of pancreatic cancer on 28 April 2004.

Mustelin was the maternal grandfather of Finnish-American basketball player Jacob Grandison.

== Sources ==
- Mustelin, Nils in Uppslagsverket Finland (in Swedish).
- Obituary for Nils Mustelin in Helsingin Sanomat (in Finnish).
- Obituary for Nils Mustelin in Hufvudstadsbladet (in Swedish).
- Nils Mustelin's web pages (mostly in Swedish and Finnish), created when Nils Mustelin was nominated as a candidate in the 1999 parliamentary election.
