= Mirage 38 =

2013 novel by Kjell Westö

The Wednesday Club
- First edition (Sweden)
- Author: Kjell Westö
- Original title: Hägring 38
- Language: Swedish
- Subject: Politics
- Set in: Helsinki, Finland 1938
- Published: 2013
- Publisher: Albert Bonniers förlag (Sweden); Schildts & Söderströms (Finland)
- Publication place: Finland
- Awards: Nordic Council's Literature Prize of 2014, Sveriges Radio's Novel Award of 2014

The Wednesday Club (Swedish: Hägring 38) is a 2013 novel by Finnish author Kjell Westö. It won the Nordic Council's Literature Prize in 2014. The novel tells about Helsinki in 1938.

== Plot ==
The story takes place over eight months in 1938 in Helsinki. The main character is lawyer Claes Thune and the book is set in a Finnish-Swedish bourgeois environment. He has been left by his wife Gabi, who has gotten together with his friend Lindemark. Banan and Lindemark meet in the discussion group Wednesday Club (Onsdagsklubben), which they have founded with old friends Arelius and Joachim Jary, to discuss politics and culture, but mostly to socialize and drink themselves senseless. The group gradually splits into a liberal section, to which Thune belongs, and a right-wing one. Adolf Hitler's expansionist policies arouse both anger and admiration. Joachim Jary suffers from insanity and is admitted to a mental hospital.

Thune becomes involved as a foreign policy writer in the daily press and is published in Svenska Pressen. In Thune's office, Matilda Wiik works as a newly hired secretary. She has tragic memories of the Finnish Civil War and the abuses committed against her in prison camps. One day, when the Wednesday Club meets in Thune's office, Matilda hears her tormented voice from the prison camp. The tormentor, "the Captain," who does not realize who Matilda is, begins to court her. Only at the end of the book does the reader learn who the "Captain" really is.

The book recounts the event at the opening of the Helsinki Olympic Stadium when Abraham Tokazier, who was of Jewish descent, crossed the finish line in the 100-metre race in first place. The official results only put him in fourth place, even though he had initially been declared the winner. In the book, Joachim Jary's nephew Salomon Jary is Tokazier.
