= Sixten Korkman =

Finnish economist

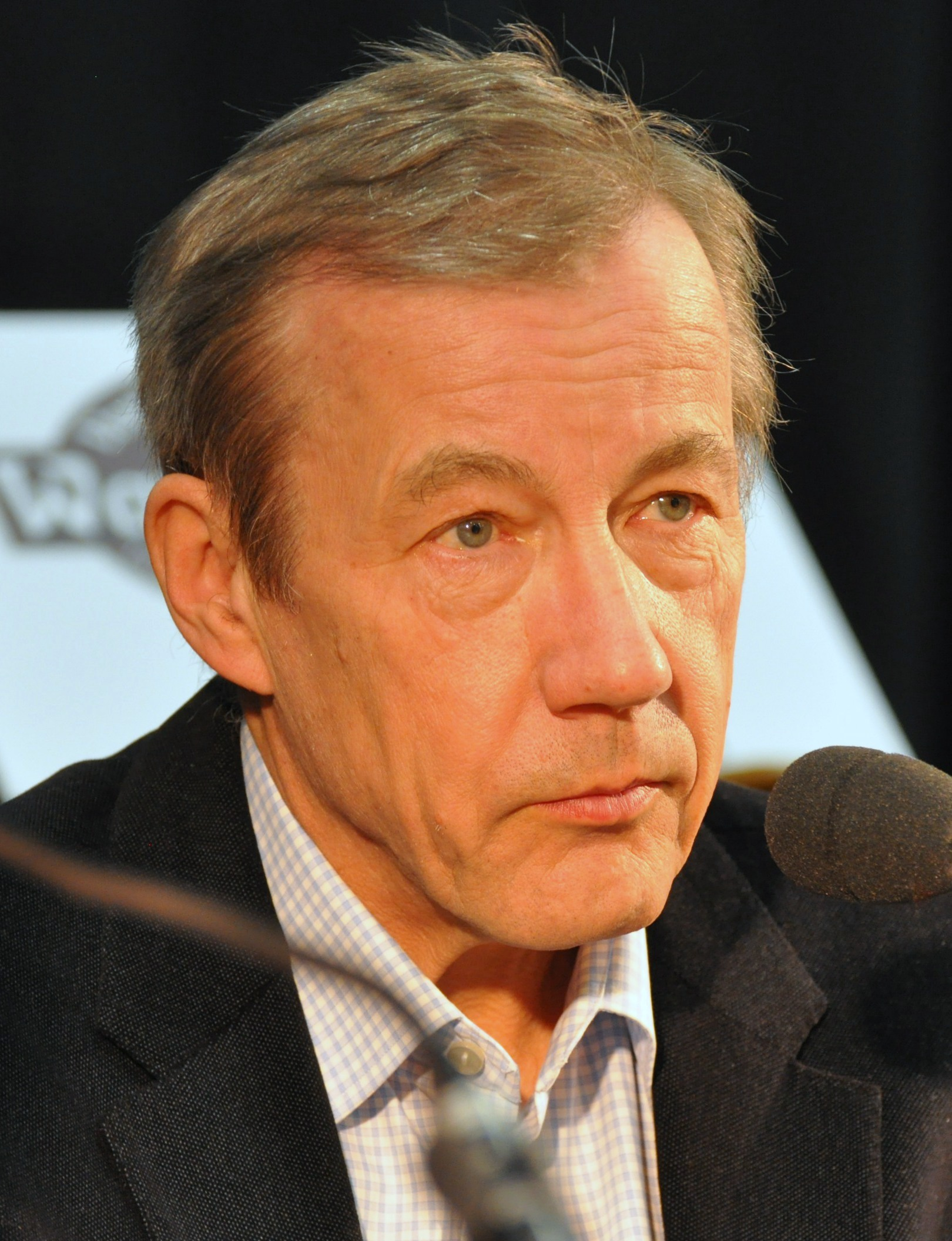
Sixten Korkman in 2013

Bror Sixten Korkman (born 3 February 1948) is a Finnish doctor of political science, an economist, former CEO of the Elinkeinoelämän tutkimuslaitos and a guest on the show Daniel Olin.

Korkman was born in Vaasa, Finland. When he was young, Korkman worked on Norwegian ocean liners. From 1981 to 1983, he was the head of the secretariat of the OECD in Paris, France. From 1995 to 2005, Korkman was the head of the Economic and Financial Affairs Council of the European Union.

== Personal life ==
Korkman is a Swedish-speaking Finn. He was once married to Marit Korkman from an unknown year to 2012. He has one child with her, Julia Korkman.

== Filmography ==
- Väärää politiikkaa (1994)
- Harmaa eminenssi (2013)
- Politiikka-Suomi (2021)

== Books ==
- Economic Policy in the European Union (published 10 November 2004)
