= Esko Valtaoja =

Finnish astronomer and writer

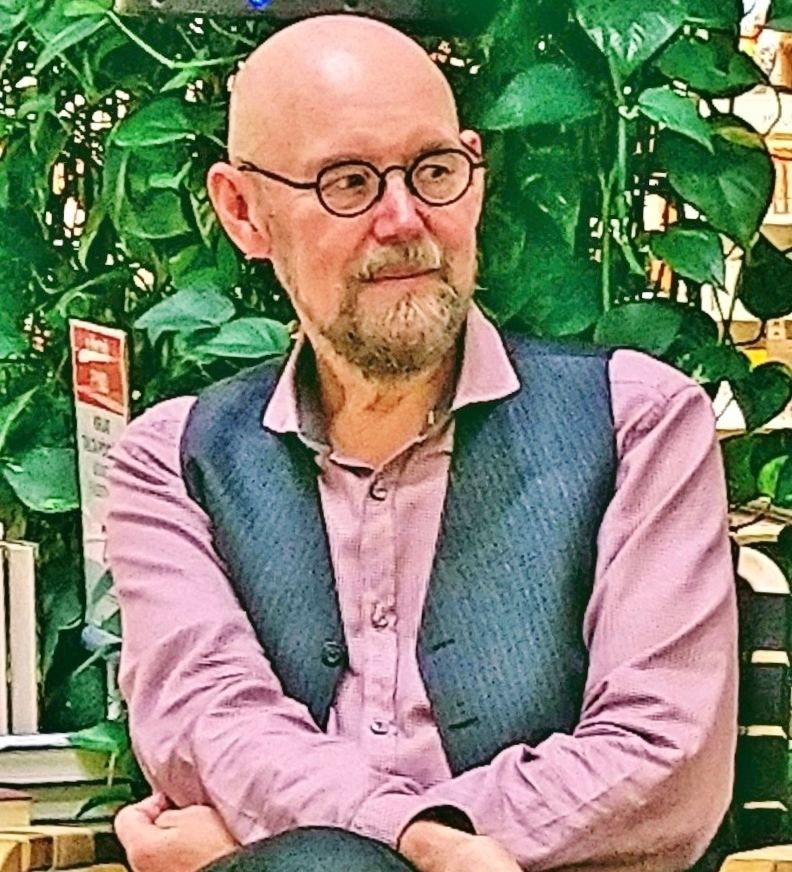
- Esko Valtaoja in 2020
- Born: 20 June 1951 (age 75); Kemi, Finland
- Employer: University of Turku
- Awards: Tieto-Finlandia 2002

Esko Jorma Johannes Valtaoja (pronounced [ˈesko ˈʋɑltɑˌojɑ]; born 20 June 1951) is a Finnish professional astronomer and writer. Valtaoja worked as a professor at the University of Turku where he studied quasars. Valtaoja retired in 2015 after holding a popular farewell lecture, that was also televised by Finnish national public broadcaster YLE.

According to the Finnish Science Barometer conducted in 2013, Esko Valtaoja was the most well known Finnish scientist in Finland.

Valtaoja was honored in 2019 when the town of Kemi decided to name a street, Valtaojankatu, after him. The naming of the street was a part of Kemi's 150th anniversary celebrations.

In 2002, his book Kotona maailmankaikkeudessa (At Home in the Cosmos, 2001) won the Finlandia Prize for the best non-fiction work. After this he became a guest-speaker at TV shows, science fiction conventions, and popular science seminars. Part of his popularity comes from his ability to present complex scientific theories and ideas in an understandable, entertaining manner to the general audience.

Since then, Valtaoja has written another book, Avoin tie (The Open Road, 2004), in which he explains his visions of the future. The book is written in a style similar to that of Kotona maailmankaikkeudessa, with the general audience in mind.

His latest book is Ihmeitä: kävelyretkiä kaikkeuteen (Wonders: Saunters to the Universe), published in October 2007. The book is the last part of his trilogy, which began with Kotona maailmankaikkeudessa, and is written in the same style as the two earlier books. As the first book is about the past and the second about the future, Valtaoja has said that it is natural to write the last about the present time.

In his free time he enjoys art and literature (especially science fiction). He is also an amateur biologist.

In 2019 Valtaoja was diagnosed with squamous cell carcinoma. The carcinoma was removed surgically, leaving Valtaoja's middle finger without a fingernail.
