= Isabella Löwengrip =

Swedish blogger (born 1990)

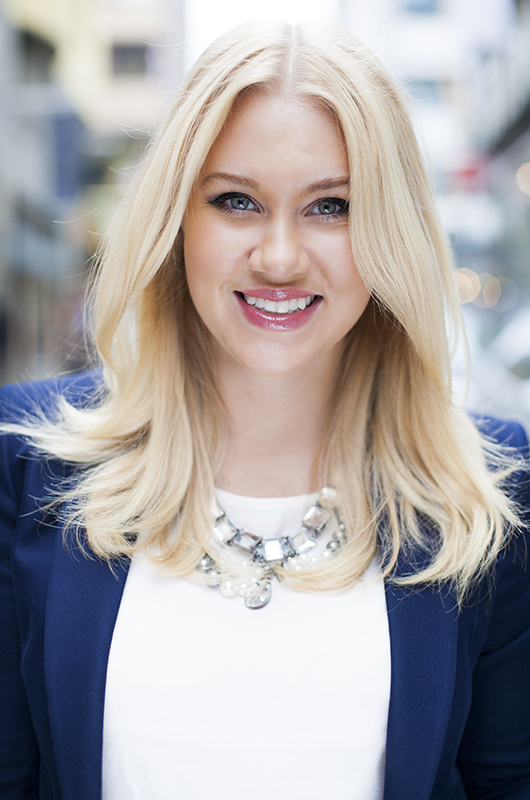
- Löwengrip in September 2012
- Born: October 21, 1990 (age 35); Stockholm, Sweden
- Occupation: Entrepreneur
- Spouse(s): Odd Spångberg (m. 2013-2017)
- Children: Gillis (b. 2013) Sally (b. 2015)

Isabella Desirée Löwengrip, also known as "Blondinbella", is a Swedish entrepreneur, author, lecturer and blogger.

== Life ==
Löwengrip was born in 1990 in Järfälla. Löwengrip attended secondary school at Jensen Gymnasium Norra in Stockholm. During her secondary school period she was politically active within the Moderate Youth League (Swedish: Moderata ungdomsförbundet, MUF). She has since left the Moderate Party.

In September 2005, at the age of 14, Löwengrip started the blog Blondinbella and thereby became one of Sweden's first social influencers. In 2010 Blondinbella.se was Sweden's largest private blog and Löwengrip was named Business Networker of the Year by Business Network International. Today Löwengrip has the biggest blog in the Nordics with more than one million visitors a month.

In 2007, at the age of 16, Löwengrip founded her first company, Bellme AB. She has since then been editor-in-chief for Egoboost Magazine and chairwoman of the board of Vj1890, played a role in the film Orion, and participated in a number of entertainment programmes, both as a host and guest.

In 2008, Löwengrip participated in the Swedish version of Dancing with The Stars, called Let's Dance, as one of the celebrity contestants. She was also an interviewer at the 2009 MTV Video Music Awards in New York City.

== Personal life ==
On August 31, 2013, Löwengrip married Odd Spångberg. The couple have two children together. On May 11, 2017, Löwengrip announced on her blog that she and Spångberg were getting a divorce.

In an interview on the television talk show Skavlan in October 2018, Löwengrip said she had been diagnosed with attention deficit hyperactivity disorder (ADHD) and Asperger syndrome.

== Awards ==
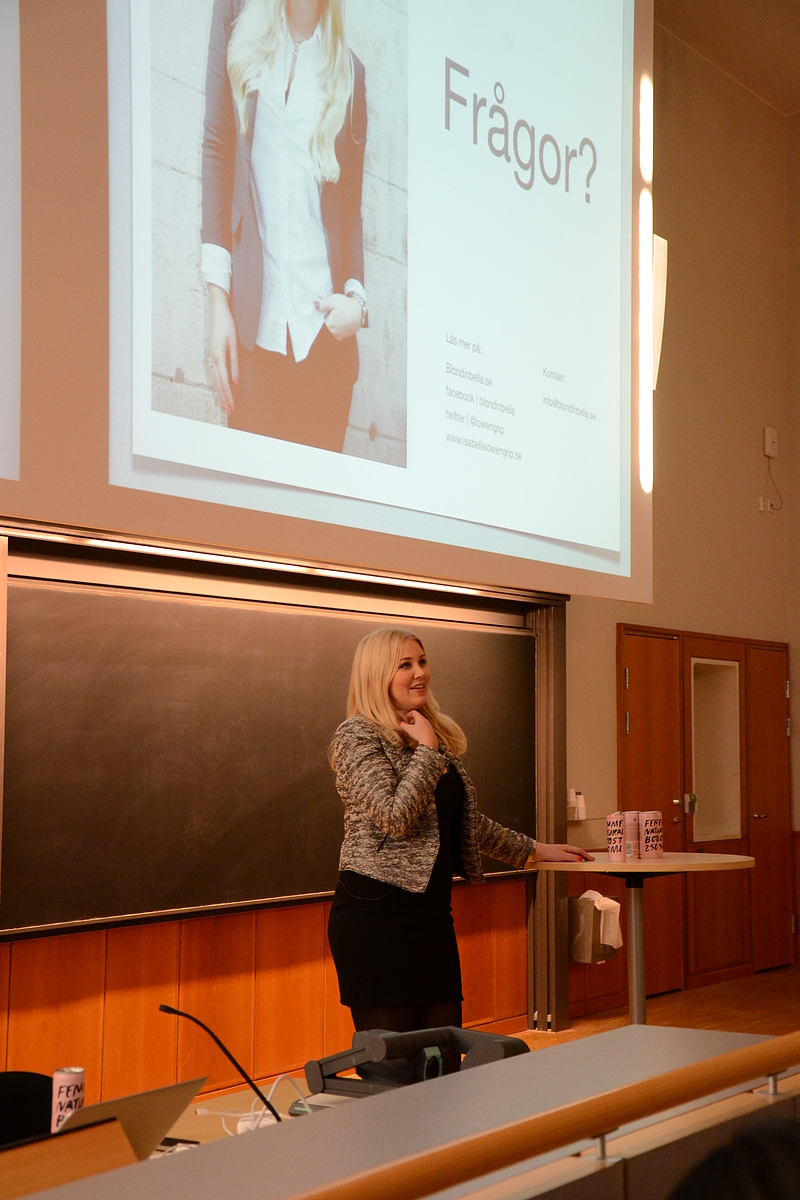
Löwengrip holding a lecture at the KTH Royal Institute of Technology in Stockholm in April 2012

- Business Networker of the Year (BNI) (2010)
- Communicator of the Year (Young Entrepreneurs of Sweden) (2011)
- Blog of the Year, business (Blog Awards, Veckorevyn) (2013)
- One of Sweden's most powerful mothers (magazine Mama) (2016)
- One of Sweden's Digital Super Influencer of the Year (Hammer & Hanborg) (2016)
