= Janne Virkkunen =

Finnish journalist (born 1948)

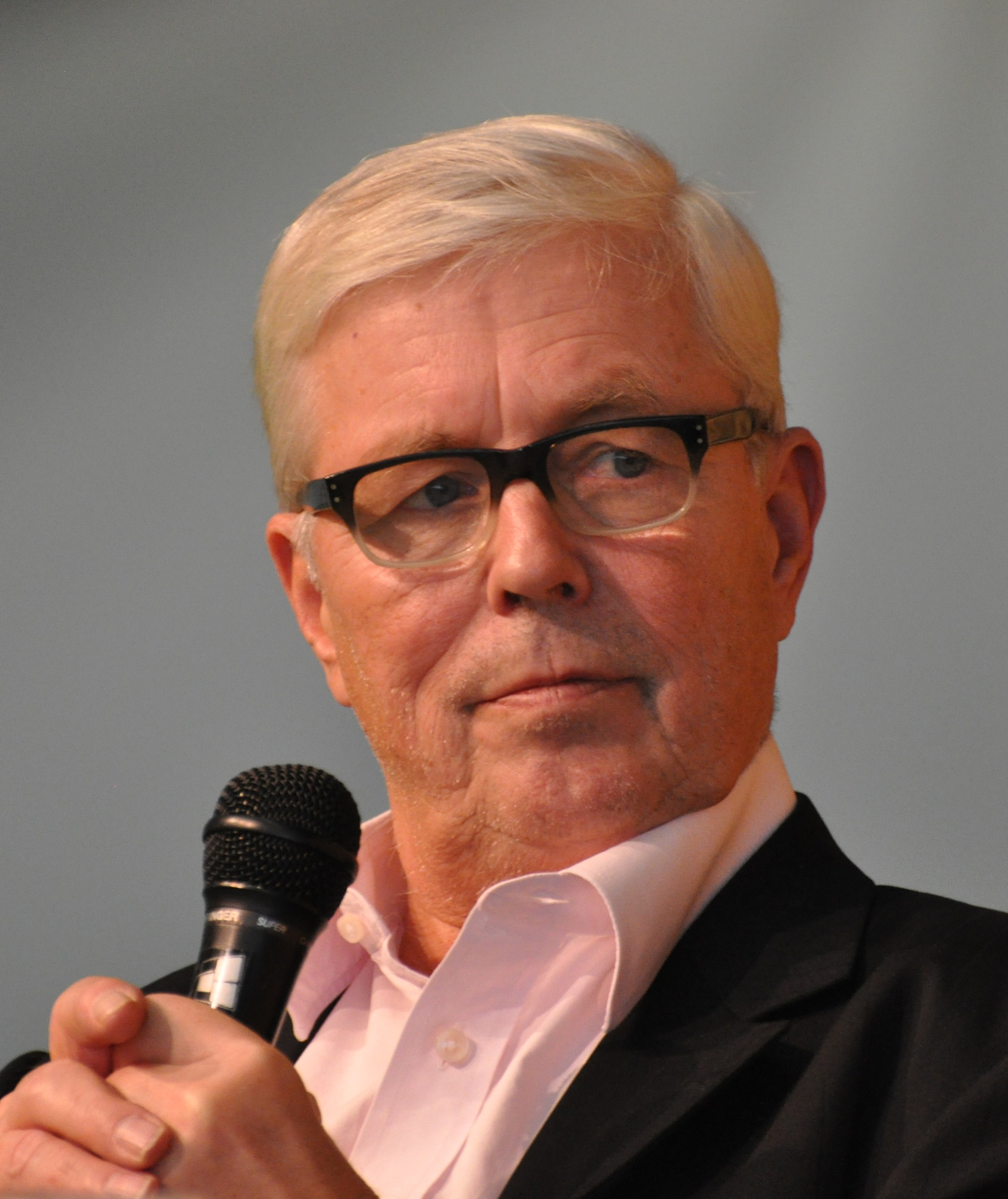
Janne Virkkunen

Janne Virkkunen (born 8 December 1948 in Helsinki) is a Finnish journalist. He was the editor-in-chief of the Helsingin Sanomat newspaper from 1991 until his retirement in 2010. Virkkunen was the chairman of the International Press Institute from 2008 to 2010.

In the early 1980s, Virkkunen co-authored the book Tamminiemen pesänjakajat, a controversial account of political power struggle in Finland towards the end of Urho Kekkonen's presidency.

Virkkunen is the greatgrandson of composer Jean Sibelius
