= Antti Juutilainen =

Finnish politician

Antti Juutilainen (15 January 1882, Ruskeala - 18 July 1951) was a Finnish farmer and politician. He was a member of the Parliament of Finland from 1916 to 1930, representing the Agrarian League.
