= Riikka Pelo =

Finnish author

Riikka Pelo (born 1972, in Helsinki) is a Finnish writer, best known for her novels Taivaankantaja (2006), which was nominated for a Runeberg Prize, and Jokapäiväinen elämämme (2013), for which she won a Finlandia Prize.

== A career and life ==
In 1998, Pelo received an honorable mention in J. H. Erko's writing competition. In 2002, he finished second in the competition.

In 2006, the first novel of Fear was published by the Heavenly Carrier, who told about Lestadianism from the perspective of a little girl. The book was nominated for the Runeberg Literature Prize and the Christian Book of the Year award. It was rewarded with the 2006 Brick Award. The English translation of the novel will be published in 2014.

Pelon Finlandia-Award-winning another novel Our daily life tells about Russian poet Marina Tsvetajeva and her daughter Ariadna Efron in the Soviet Union. In December 2013, it was also nominated for Runeberg.

Peli completes his doctoral dissertation at Aalto University for the Department of Film and Stage. He is a former chairman of the board of the Young Voima Federation. Peli lives in Roihuvuori in Helsinki. He has a man and two children.
