= Anita Krohn Traaseth =

Norwegian business executive and author (born 1971)

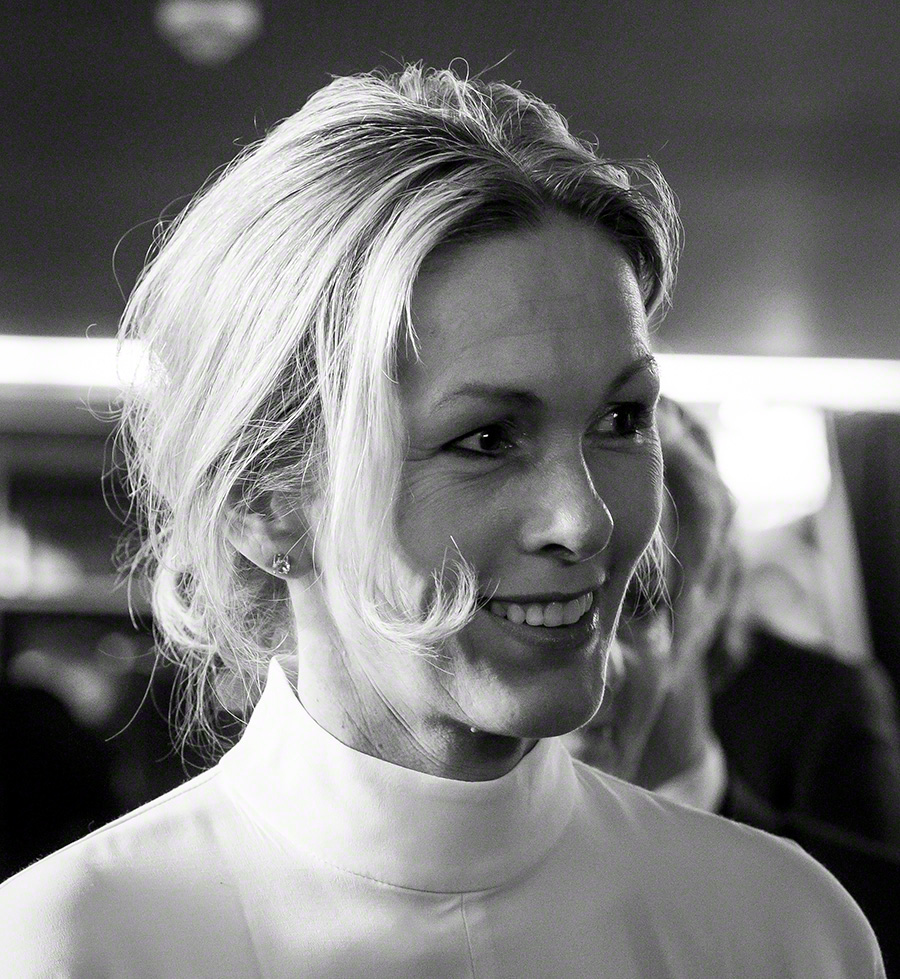
- Traaseth in 2016
- Born: December 16, 1971 (age 54); Sandefjord, Norway
- Occupations: Businessperson, author

Anita Krohn Traaseth (born 16 December 1971 in Sandefjord) is a Norwegian business executive and author. She was director of Innovation Norway from 2014 to 2018 and is currently chair of the board for a number of companies. She is a former managing director of Hewlett-Packard Norway. She lives in Oslo.

== Career ==
Krohn Traaseth started her career as a trainee in IBM Norge in 1996. She joined the Norwegian division of Hewlett-Packard (HP) in 2009 and in 2012 she became the first female managing director running a local branch of Hewlett-Packard in Scandinavia. She was the former CEO of the commercializing company Simula Innovation, and was director of strategy in DNV Software between 2002 and 2005. She has been a board member of KLP and since 2013 elected President of HP EMEA (Europe, Middle East, Africa) Women's Council.

Krohn Traaseth became well known for the Norwegian public when she published her application for the MD position of HP Norway in her private leadership blog Tinteguri (established 2012). She is inspired by John Kotter and implements his eight step for transformation in all operative job assignments. She was voted one of top Young business talents in Norway 2003, ranked amongst top 40 Leader potentials cross business, politics and science in Norway 2009 and received the awards for best female leader in the ICT industry in Norway 2012, ODA-awards. In 2013 she received the Social Media Personality of the Year Award from Kampanje.

She was director of Innovation Norway from 2014 to 2018. In that same period, Innovation Norway delivered 24% more services to Norwegians business, reduced operating costs by 6% and was awarded the Most Attractive Employer of the year by students three years in a row. She resigned in 2018 after delivering what the Norwegian newspaper Aftenposten described as "the best results for the company ever". Traaseth is currently chair of the board for a number of companies including Start Up Norway, Qvisten Animation, Skyfri and Bocuse d'Or Norway. She also sits on the board of the European Innovation Council with a mandate to advise on overall strategy for the EIC, identification of strategic portfolios of projects and actions to improve the European innovation ecosystem. In addition Traaseth runs what the business paper Kampanje has branded "Norways number one podcast on leadership" with over one million downloads.

== Published works ==
In March 2014, Krohn Traaseth published her first book Godt nok for de svina; it was published in English as Good Enough for the 'Bastards' in August of that year. She has since published the novel Kamel uten filter in 2019 and the leadership memoir Fisken på Disken in 2021.
