= Kira Poutanen =

Finnish writer, translator and actress (born 1974)

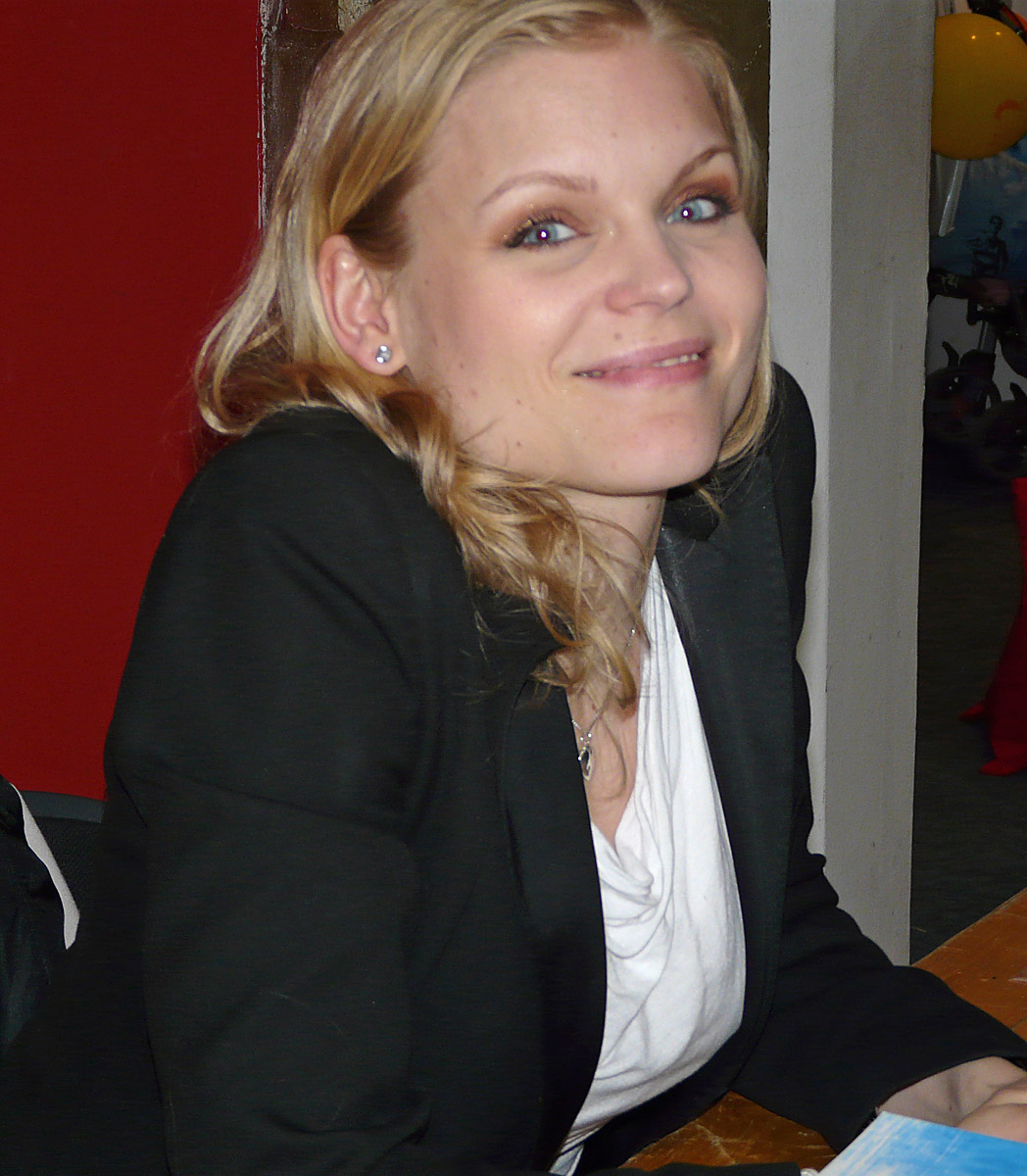
Finnish writer Kira Poutanen. 2011, International Bookfest in Budapest.

Kira Poutanen (born 1974) is a Finnish writer, translator and actress. She holds a Master of Philosophy and is currently living in France.

In 2001, Poutanen released her first novel, Ihana meri, which was awarded the Finlandia Junior Prize. The book tells the story of an anorexic girl named Julia and the novel has been translated into Danish, Dutch, Hungarian and Latvian.

== Bibliography ==
- Ihana meri (2001)
- Katso minua! (2004)
- Kotimatka (2009)
- Rakkautta au lait (2009)
- Rakkautta al dente (2010)
- Rakkautta on the rocks (2011)
- Rakkautta borealis (2012)
- Ibiza, original audiobook (2018)
- Surun kartta (2021)
