= Mika Rissanen =

Finnish researcher and writer (born 1978)

Mika Rissanen (born 1978) is a Finnish history researcher and author of non-fiction and young adult literature.

In 2005, Rissanen's book Antiikin Urheilu (Sports in Antiquity, co-written with Sami Koski and Juha Tahvanainen) won Tieto-Finlandia award for the best non-fiction book in Finland. In 2016 his non-fiction book Down Beer Street: History in a Pint Glass (co-written with Juha Tahvanainen) was published in English, in German and in Italian.

Rissanen has written his young adult thrillers, Arkeomysteeri series (Archeomystery) in co-operation with Juha Tahvanainen using the pseudonym Nemo Rossi.

Academic researches of Rissanen are focused in ancient history and European cultural history.

== Bibliography ==
=== Non-fiction books ===
- Antiikin Urheilu ("Sports in Antiquity") (2004)
- Hävityksen historiaa: Eurooppalaisen vandalismin vuosisadat ("A History of Destruction: European Vandalism through the Ages") (2007)
- Kuohuvaa historiaa: tarinoita tuopin takaa ("History of Europe in 24 Pints") (2014)
- Rooma, suden kaupunki ("Rome, a City of the Wolf") (2018)

=== Young adult literature ===
- Rooman sudet ("The Wolves of Rome") (2012)
- Mafian linnut ("The Mafia Birds") (2014)
- Jumalista seuraava ("Next to the Gods") (2014)
- Viimeinen etruski ("The Last Etruscan") (2016)
- Salainen veljeskunta ("The Secret Brotherhood") (2018)
