= Kjell Westö =

Finnish writer and journalist (born 1961)

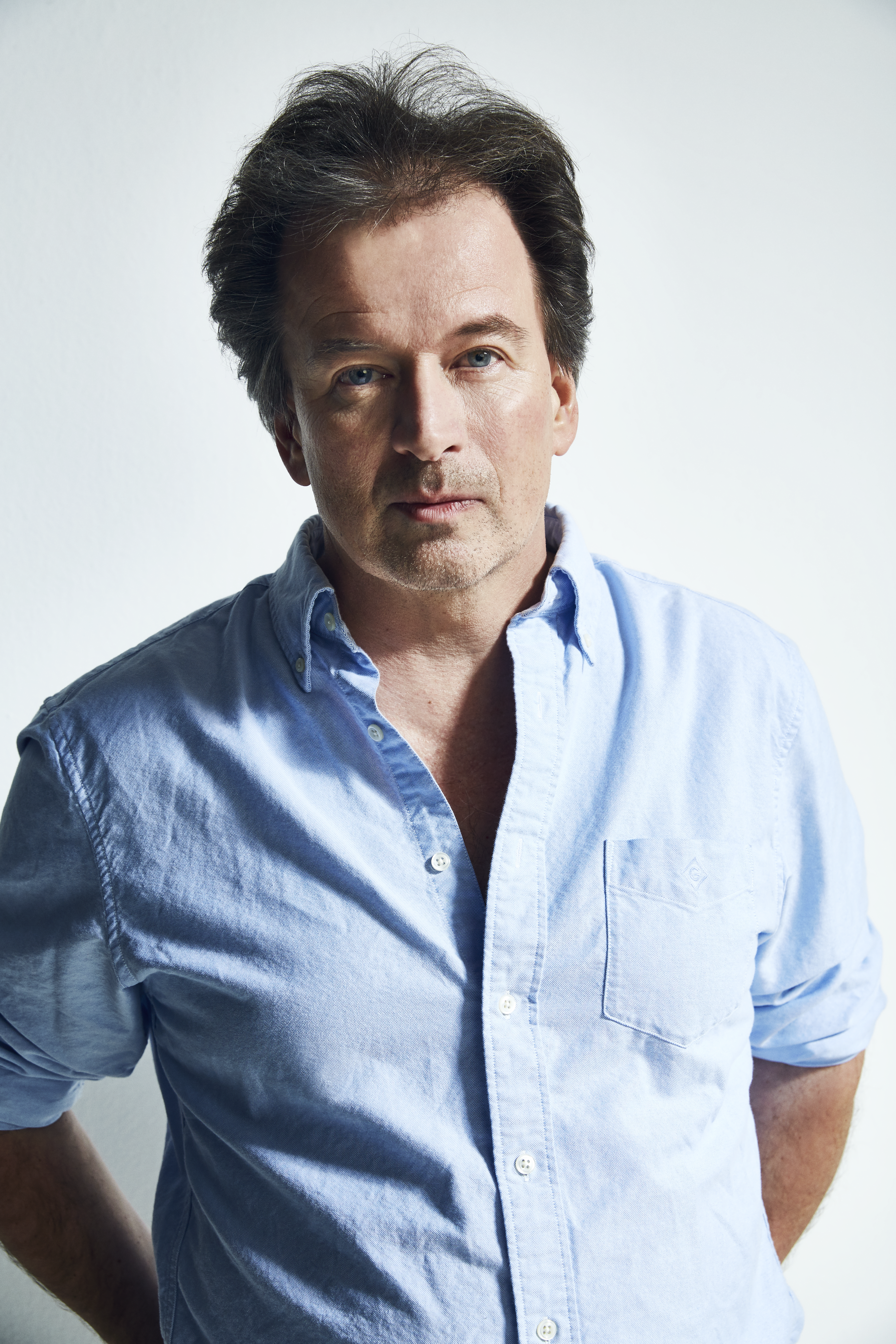
- Westö in 2017
- Born: 6 August 1961 (age 65); Helsinki, Finland
- Occupations: Author, journalist
- Writing career
- Language: Swedish
- Period: 1986–present
- Notable awards: Finlandia Prize Nordic Council Literature Prize
- Website: kjellwesto.com

Kjell Westö (born 6 August 1961) is a Finnish author and journalist. Westö writes in Swedish. Best known for his epic novels set in Helsinki, he has also written short stories, poetry, essays and newspaper columns.

== Biography ==
His family comes from Ostrobothnia. Kjell Westö studied journalism at the Swedish School of Social Science in Helsinki, and began his career as a journalist at Hufvudstadsbladet, Finland's largest Swedish-language newspaper, and at the politically left leaning magazine Ny Tid.

Kjell Westö made his literary debut as a poet in 1986. Three years later his first volume of prose, Utslag och andra noveller (Rasch and Other Stories), was published. It was a critical success and was nominated for the prestigious Finlandia Prize. Westö's earliest works provided glimpses of his future strengths, particularly an assured command of dialogue, setting and mood.

Kjell Westö's first novel, Drakarna över Helsingfors (Kites over Helsinki, 1996), made a huge impact on Swedish- and Finnish-speaking audiences in Finland. His next novels, Vådan av att vara Skrake (The Peril of Being a Skrake, 2000) and Lang (Lang, 2002), were nominated for the Finlandia Prize as well as the Nordic Council Literature Prize, and Lang was translated into thirteen languages. His fourth novel, Där vi en gång gått (Where We Once Walked, 2006), secured Kjell Westö's status as an author for all of Finland and won him the Finlandia Prize. Both its Swedish and Finnish editions were commercial successes in Finland and the novel was also Westö's breakthrough in Sweden. A stage adaptation was performed at Helsinki City Theatre, and the story was made into a film and TV series.

In his depictions of different eras, Kjell Westö portrays fragile, vulnerable individuals and the impact the big historical events have on them. This practice continues in his fifth novel, Gå inte ensam ut i natten (Do Not Go Alone Into the Night, 2009), and his sixth, Hägring 38 (Mirage 38, 2013). Like Westö's previous works, Hägring 38 is a Helsinki novel, a portrait of an era and of a social class. It was nominated for the Finlandia Prize and Sweden's August Prize, and was awarded the 2014 Nordic Council Literature Prize and the Swedish Radio Novel Prize. That same year Westö received two more awards from Sweden – the Aniara Prize and The Nine Society's Grand Prize – for his entire literary oeuvre.

Today, Kjell Westö's works have been translated into over 20 languages, and he is a seven-time recipient of awards from the Society of Swedish Literature in Finland. Den svavelgula himlen (The Sulphur-Yellow Sky) is his seventh novel. It was published in 2017 in Swedish, Finnish, Norwegian and Danish, with French, German and Dutch translation rights also sold; a film based on the novel was released in 2021.

In September 2017, the stage version of Hägring 38, adapted by Mikaela Hasan and Michael Baran and directed by Mikaela Hasan, had its Finnish-language premiere at the Finnish National Theatre in Helsinki.

In 2020, Westö's eighth novel Tritonus was published. It was followed in 2023 by Skymning 41, a historical novel set in the early 1940s during the Winter War and Continuation War in Finland.

== Bibliography ==
- Tango orange (1986)
- Epitaf över Mr. Nacht (1988)
- Avig-Bön (1989; under the pseudonym Anders Hed)
- Utslag och andra noveller (1989)
- Fallet Bruus. Tre berättelser (1992)
- Drakarna över Helsingfors (1996)
- Metropol (1998; with Kristoffer Albrecht)
- Vådan av att vara Skrake (2000)
- Lang (2002)
- Lugna favoriter (2004)
- Där vi en gång gått (lit. 'Where We Once Went', novel, 2006)
- Gå inte ensam ut i natten (2009)
- Sprickor: valda texter 1986–2011 (2011)
- Mirage 38 (Swedish: Hägring 38, novel, 2013)
- Den svavelgula himlen (2017)
- Tritonus (2020)
- Skymning 41 (2023)

== Awards ==
Kjell Westö has received several prestigious awards and acknowledgements. He has been nominated for the Finlandia Prize in 1989 (Utslag), 2000 (Vådan av att vara Skrake), 2002 (Lang) and 2013 (Hägring 38). He won the prize in 2006 for Där vi en gång gått.

Westö has also been nominated for the Nordic Council Literature Prize in 2001 (Vådan av att vara Skrake) and 2003 (Lang). He received the Nordic Council Literature Prize in 2014 for Hägring 38. The same year he received the Swedish Radio Novel Prize for Hägring 38 and two more awards from Sweden – the Aniara Prize and The Nine Society's Grand Prize – for his entire literary oeuvre. The Society of Swedish Literature in Finland has awarded Westö in 1987, 1990, 1997, 2001, 2007, 2010 and 2014.
