= Jan Mosander =

Swedish journalist and author (born 1944)

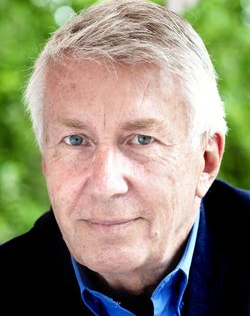
- Born: Jan Eric Gustaf Mosander; 13 August 1944 (age 82); Stockholm, Sweden
- Occupations: Journalist, author
- Spouses: Ulla Lemberg (m. 1975–1977) Ingalill Mosander (m. 1987)
- Awards: Stora journalistpriset (1987)

Jan Eric Gustaf Mosander (born 13 August 1944) is a Swedish journalist and author.

== Biography ==
Mosander was born in Stockholm and grew up in Helsinki, Finland. In Finland he worked as a reporter for the newspapers Västa Nyland in Ekenäs and Nya Pressen in Helsinki. In 1968, he had moved to Sweden and worked as a reporter for Expressen in Stockholm. He was a foreign correspondent in Germany for Expressen between 1970 and 1973, and for Sveriges Radio between 1994 and 1997. He has won Stora journalistpriset in 1987. Mosander worked at Aftonbladet between 1979 and 1983. He presented an episode of Sommar i P1 on 2 July 1987.

Between 1975 and 1977, he was married to photographer Ulla Lemberg, and since 1987 he is married to journalist Ingalill Mosander. He along with his wife survived the Costa Concordia disaster in 2012.
