= Ingalill Mosander =

Swedish journalist

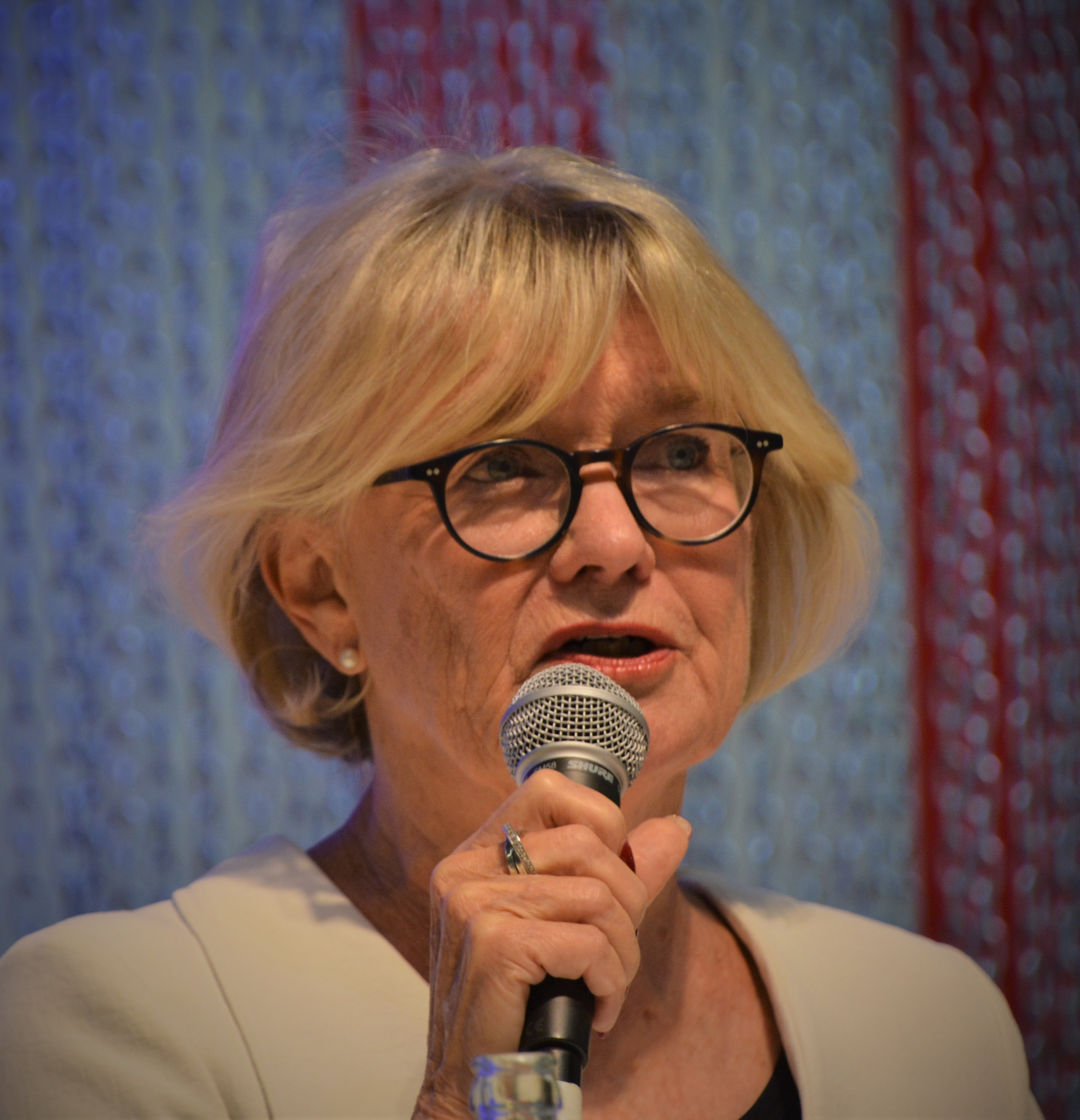
- Mosander in 2018
- Born: Ingalill Margareta Larsson; 17 July 1943 (age 82); Eskilstuna, Sweden
- Occupation: Journalist
- Spouses: Bo Eriksson (m. 1967–1974) Jan Mosander (m. 1987)

Ingalill Margareta Mosander (née Larsson; born 17 July 1943), is a Swedish journalist, known as a prolific book reviewer on television and in printed media.

== Biography ==
Mosander was born in Eskilstuna.

She has worked as a journalist at Dagens Nyheter, Vestmanlands Läns Tidning, Bildjournalen, Vecko-Journalen and Expressen, and at Aftonbladet since 1979. In 2006, the magazine Svensk bokhandel named her "Sweden's most influential journalist in the book business". She was the host of an episode of the Sommar radio show in June 2014, and she also reviews books for the website, Senioren. In 2004, she was awarded the Axel Liffner-stipend.

From 1999 until 2019, Mosander reviewed books weekly for the television show Go'kväll broadcast on SVT. In September 2019, SVT announced that they had decided not to keep Mosander's book review segment in the show, which led to criticism from many viewers. Mosander protested the decision.

== Personal life ==
Mosander was married to surgeon Bo Eriksson between 1967 and 1974. In 1987, she married journalist Jan Mosander. Ingalill Mosander and her husband were two of five Swedes that survived the Costa Concordia disaster in 2012. Mosander supported the conviction of the captain, Francesco Schettino.
