= Alf Rehn =

Finnish professor

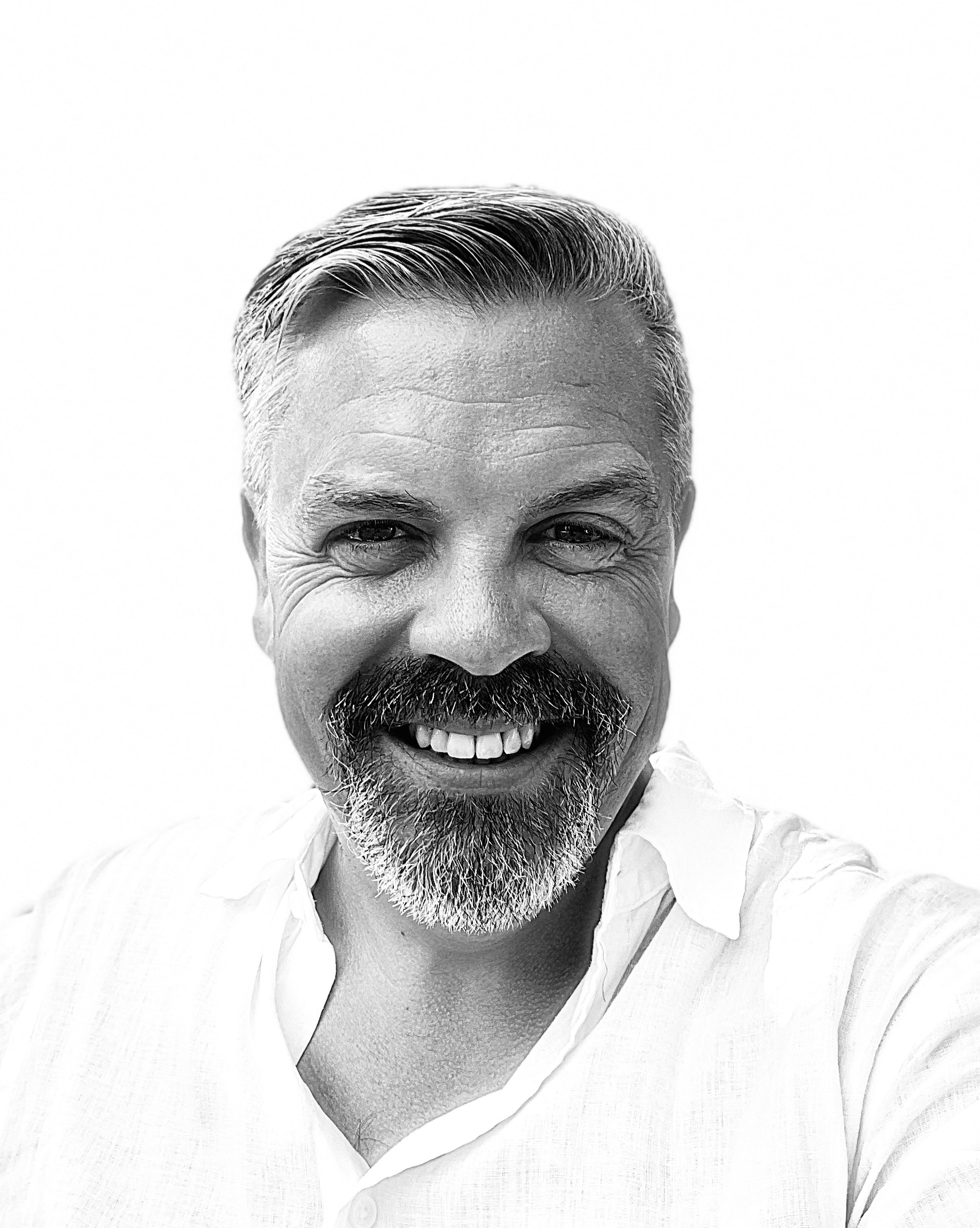
- Born: March 21, 1972 (age 54); Turku
- Education: Royal Institute of Technology
- Occupations: Professor, author, speaker
- Children: 3
- Website: alfrehn.com

Alf Rehn (born 1972) is a Finnish professor, author and speaker based in Denmark. He was previously the Chair of Management and Organization at Åbo Akademi University in Finland. Currently, he is a Professor of Innovation, Design, and Management at the University of Southern Denmark. Rehn works as a columnist, and sits on the board of directors for several companies, including Veikkaus.

Rehn was listed as #13 on the 2009 Thinkers 50, in the "Up and Coming Business Thinkers” list. He was listed for a second time in 2011.

== Career ==
After completing his doctorate in industrial management in 2002, he started teaching at the Royal Institute of Technology and later become the Stockholm School of Entrepreneurship Professor of Innovation and Entrepreneurship at the institute. Since 2004, he has been the chair of management and organization at Åbo Akademi University, and still holds the position. At the time, he was the youngest chair in Finland. Currently, he is a professor of innovation, design, and management at SDU-the University of Southern Denmark.

Rehn frequently keynotes corporate and other events, including TEDx-events and Ciudad de las Ideas. He is also a frequent columnist and media commentator.

== Books ==
Rehn has published several books, articles and columns. In 2011, he published the book Dangerous Ideas: When Provocative Thinking Becomes Your Most Valuable Asset, which discusses how creative ideas are perceived initially as dangerous and inappropriate. The book has been translated into eight languages. He published the Johtajuuden Ristiriidat in 2018, which is about leadership conflicts. In 2019, Rehn published a book Innovation for the Fatigued: how to build a culture of deep creativity.

== Personal life ==
He currently lives in Denmark. and has three children.

== Awards and honors ==
Rehn was listed as #13 on the 2009 Thinkers 50, in the "Up and Coming Business Thinkers” list. In 2011, he was named on the list for a second time. In the 2012 Finnish Thinkers 20-list, published by Nordic Business Report magazine, he was rated third among business thinkers in Finland. He was voted Speaker of the Year in Finland in 2010.

== Bibliography ==
- Polygonmakarna – Spelbranschens Högteknologiska Upplevelseekonomi (The Polygon Makers – The Gaming Industry as a High-tech Experience Economy) (2003)
- Resan, Jobbet Och Metafysiken – Projektledning Och Tidens Problem (Travel, Toil and Metaphysics – Project Management and the Problem of Time) (2004)
- The Serious Unreal – Notes on Business and Frivolity (2004)
- Företagsekonomin och “La Trahison des Clercs” (Business Studies and the Treason of the Intellectuals) (2006)
- The Scholar's Progress – Essays on Academic Life and Survival (2006)
- Gåvan Idag – Altruismen och den Moderna Ekonomin (The Gift Today – Altruism and Modern Economy) (2006)
- Vad är Företagsekonomi? (What is Business Studies?) (2007)
- För Företagsekonomin/Business, Rehnt ut Sagt (For Business Studies) (2009)
- Makt (Power) (2009)
- Farliga Idéer (Dangerous Ideas) (2011)
- Suunnaton Suomi (2012)
- Trendspotting – The Basics (2013)
- Frivolous Business – Essays on Excess, Play and Pataphysics in Economy (2013)
- Unelmien Talous (2014)
- Innovation. Malmö: Liber (2017)
- Johtajuuden ristiriidat Jyväskylä: Docendo (2018)
- Ledarskapsparadoxen. Stockholm: Volante (2019)
- Innovation for the Fatigued: How to Build a Culture of Deep Creativity (2019)
