= List of Nordic Council's Literature Prize winners and nominees =

This is a list of Nordic Council's Literature Prize winners and nominees. The first prize was awarded in 1962.

Year		English title	Original title	Author	Country
1962	Winner	The Days of His Grace	Hans nådes tid	Eyvind Johnson	Sweden
1962	Longlist		Gamaliels besættelse	William Heinesen	Denmark
1962	Longlist		Skygger på græsset	Karen Blixen	Denmark
1962	Longlist	Under the North Star 2: The Uprising	Täällä Pohjantähden alla 2	Väinö Linna	Finland
1962	Longlist		Hemkomst	Hagar Olsson	Finland
1962	Longlist		Paradísarheimt	Halldór Laxness	Iceland
1962	Longlist		Brannen	Tarjei Vesaas	Norway
1962	Longlist		Den rykende tande	Arnulf Øverland	Norway
1962	Longlist		Slottet i dalen	Åke Wassing	Sweden
1963	Winner	Under the North Star 3: Reconciliation	Täällä Pohjantähden alla 3	Väinö Linna	Finland
1963	Longlist	Arabia Felix	Det lykkelige Arabien	Thorkild Hansen	Denmark
1963	Longlist		Natten i ventesalen	Poul Ørum	Denmark
1963	Longlist		Tjurens år	Oscar Parland	Finland
1963	Longlist		Sonur minn Sinfjötli	Guðmundur Daníelsson	Iceland
1963	Longlist		År på en strand	Gunnar Reiss-Andersen	Norway
1963	Longlist		Felicias bryllup	Aksel Sandemose	Norway
1963	Longlist		En natt i Otoçac	Gunnar Ekelöf	Sweden
1963	Longlist		Finnas till	Sivar Arnér	Sweden
1964	Winner	The Ice Palace	Is-slottet	Tarjei Vesaas	Norway
1964	Longlist		Den onde lykke	Tove Ditlevsen	Denmark
1964	Longlist		Fern fra Danmark	Leif Panduro	Denmark
1964	Longlist		Lekar för enslingar	Eeva-Liisa Manner	Finland
1964	Longlist		Sujut	Veijo Meri	Finland
1964	Longlist		Stund og staðir	Hannes Pétursson	Iceland
1964	Longlist		Koloss	Finn Alnæs	Norway
1964	Longlist		Svärdfäktarna	Sven Fagerberg	Sweden
1964	Longlist		Tvärbalk	Sivar Arnér	Sweden
1965	Winner	The Good Hope	Det gode Håb	William Heinesen	Denmark
1965	Winner	From Hell to Paradise	Från helvetet till paradiset	Olof Lagercrantz	Sweden
1965	Longlist		Ariel	H. C. Branner	Denmark
1965	Longlist		Den blå modern	Christer Kihlman	Finland
1965	Longlist		Peiliin piirretty nainen	Veijo Meri	Finland
1965	Longlist		Húsið	Guðmundur Daníelsson	Iceland
1965	Longlist		Land og synir	Indriði G. Þorsteinsson	Iceland
1965	Longlist		Blåtind	Johan Borgen	Norway
1965	Longlist		Kometene	Finn Carling	Norway
1965	Longlist		Med fem diamanter	Sara Lidman	Sweden
1966	Winner	Diwan on the Prince of Emgion	Dīwān över Fursten av Emgión	Gunnar Ekelöf	Sweden
1966	Longlist		Formynderfortællinger	Villy Sørensen	Denmark
1966	Longlist		Jens Munk	Thorkild Hansen	Denmark
1966	Longlist		Madeleine	Christer Kihlman	Finland
1966	Longlist		Mörkrets kärna	Marianne Alopaeus	Finland
1966	Longlist		Tregaslagur	Jóhannes úr Kötlum	Iceland
1966	Longlist		Kongen. Mannen fra utskjæret	Kåre Holt	Norway
1966	Longlist		Nye noveller	Johan Borgen	Norway
1966	Longlist		Två dagar, två nätter	Per Olof Sundman	Sweden
1967	Winner		Nye noveller	Johan Borgen	Norway
1967	Longlist		Byen ligger skjult av lyset	Willy-August Linnemann	Denmark
1967	Longlist		Operaelskeren	Klaus Rifbjerg	Denmark
1967	Longlist		73 dikter	Bo Carpelan	Finland
1967	Longlist		Puut, kaikki heidän vihreytensä	Paavo Haavikko	Finland
1967	Longlist		Dægurvísa	Jakobína Sigurðardóttir	Iceland
1967	Longlist		Dúfnaveislan	Halldór Laxness	Iceland
1967	Longlist		Tids alder	Stein Mehren	Norway
1967	Longlist		Lotus i Hades	Lars Gyllensten	Sweden
1967	Longlist		Självporträtt av en drömmare med öppna ögon	Artur Lundkvist	Sweden
1968	Winner	Flight of the Eagle	Ingenjör Andrées luftfärd	Per Olof Sundman	Sweden
1968	Longlist		Byen ligger skjult af lyset	Willy-August Linnemann	Denmark
1968	Longlist		Der er æg i mit skæg	Jørgen Gustava Brandt	Denmark
1968	Longlist		Dikt	Rabbe Enckell	Finland
1968	Longlist		Och sanning?	Rabbe Enckell	Finland
1968	Longlist		Bak við byrgða glugga	Gréta Sigfúsdóttir	Iceland
1968	Longlist		Lauf og stjörnur	Snorri Hjartarson	Iceland
1968	Longlist		Frihetens øyeblikk	Jens Bjørneboe	Norway
1968	Longlist		Livstegn og speilinger	Odd Hølaas	Norway
1968	Longlist		Nattresa	Sven Delblanc	Sweden
1969	Winner	The Legionnaires	Legionärerna	Per Olov Enquist	Sweden
1969	Longlist		Ravnen	Thorkild Bjørnvig	Denmark
1969	Longlist	Ships of Slaves	Slavernes skibe	Thorkild Hansen	Denmark
1969	Longlist		Agricola ja kettu	Paavo Haavikko	Finland
1969	Longlist		Tapetdörren	Rabbe Enckell	Finland
1969	Longlist		Márus á Valshamri og meistari Jón	Guðmundur Gíslason Hagalín	Iceland
1969	Longlist		Þjófur í paradís	Indriði G. Þorsteinsson	Iceland
1969	Longlist		…født til kunstner	Hans Heiberg	Norway
1969	Longlist		Gemini	Finn Alnæs	Norway
1969	Longlist		Ändå	Lars Forssell	Sweden
1970	Winner	Anna, I, Anna	Anna (jeg) Anna	Klaus Rifbjerg	Denmark
1970	Longlist		Det	Inger Christensen	Denmark
1970	Longlist		Audun ja jääkarhu	Paavo Haavikko	Finland
1970	Longlist		Vaka	Tito Colliander	Finland
1970	Longlist		Hjartað í borði	Agnar Þórðarson	Iceland
1970	Longlist		Innlönd	Hannes Pétursson	Iceland
1970	Longlist		Kongen. Hersker og trell	Kåre Holt	Norway
1970	Longlist		Mot et hemmelig mål	Astrid Tollefsen	Norway
1970	Longlist		Inre	Werner Aspenström	Sweden
1970	Longlist		Slagskuggan	Sven Lindqvist	Sweden
1971	Winner	Coast of Slaves, Ships of Slaves and Islands of Slaves	Slavernes kyst, Slavernes skibe and Slavernes øer	Thorkild Hansen	Denmark
1971	Longlist		Hyrder	Peter Seeberg	Denmark
1971	Longlist		Jag går där jag går	Pentti Saarikoski	Finland
1971	Longlist		Minä, Olli ja Orvokki	Hannu Salama	Finland
1971	Longlist		Fljótt, fljótt sagði fuglinn	Thor Vilhjálmsson	Iceland
1971	Longlist		Leigjandinn	Svava Jakobsdóttir	Iceland
1971	Longlist		Aurora. Det niende mørke	Stein Mehren	Norway
1971	Longlist		Irr! Grønt!	Dag Solstad	Norway
1971	Longlist		Åminne	Sven Delblanc	Sweden
1971	Longlist		Palatset i parken	Lars Gyllensten	Sweden
1972	Winner		Sju ord på tunnelbanan	Karl Vennberg	Sweden
1972	Longlist		Fuglefri og fremmed	Elsa Gress	Denmark
1972	Longlist		Sæt verden er til	Svend Åge Madsen	Denmark
1972	Longlist		Katselen Stalinin pään yli ulos	Pentti Saarikoski	Finland
1972	Longlist		Nära	Tito Colliander	Finland
1972	Longlist		Himinbjargarsaga eða Skógadraumur	Þorsteinn frá Hamri	Iceland
1972	Longlist		Leigjandinn	Svava Jakobsdóttir	Iceland
1972	Longlist		Isfuglen	Hans Børli	Norway
1972	Longlist		Ved neste nymåne	Torborg Nedreaas	Norway
1972	Longlist		Dikter om ljus och mörker	Harry Martinson	Sweden
1973	Winner		Kersantin poika	Veijo Meri	Finland
1973	Longlist		Rubruk	Poul Vad	Denmark
1973	Longlist		Människan som skalv	Christer Kihlman	Finland
1973	Longlist		Norðan við stríð	Indriði G. Þorsteinsson	Iceland
1973	Longlist		Ný og nið	Jóhannes úr Kötlum	Iceland
1973	Longlist		Arild Asnes, 1970	Dag Solstad	Norway
1973	Longlist		Pass for dørene – dørene lukkes	Rolf Jacobsen	Norway
1973	Longlist		Det oavslutade språket	Göran Sonnevi	Sweden
1973	Longlist		Sjukdomen	Birgitta Trotzig	Sweden
1974	Winner		Uden mål – og med	Villy Sørensen	Denmark
1974	Longlist		Visse hensyn	Christian Kampmann	Denmark
1974	Longlist		Källan	Bo Carpelan	Finland
1974	Longlist		Korpraali Julin	Alpo Ruuth	Finland
1974	Longlist		Dómínó	Jökull Jakobsson	Iceland
1974	Longlist		Gunnar og Kjartan	Vésteinn Lúðvíksson	Iceland
1974	Longlist		Guds tjener	Tor Edvin Dahl	Norway
1974	Longlist		Pass for dørene – dørene lukkes	Rolf Jacobsen	Norway
1974	Longlist	The Animal Doctor	Djurdoktorn	P. C. Jersild	Sweden
1974	Longlist		Stenfågel	Sven Delblanc	Sweden
1975	Winner		Siinä näkijä missä tekijä	Hannu Salama	Finland
1975	Longlist		Her omkring	Jørgen Gustava Brandt	Denmark
1975	Longlist		Kun sandheden	Poul Ørum	Denmark
1975	Longlist		Rumskamrater	Claes Andersson	Finland
1975	Longlist		Yfirvaldið	Þorgeir Þorgeirsson	Iceland
1975	Longlist		Það sefur í djúpinu and Hermann og Dídí	Guðbergur Bergsson	Iceland
1975	Longlist		Haiene	Jens Bjørneboe	Norway
1975	Longlist		Kjærleikens ferjereiser	Edvard Hoem	Norway
1975	Longlist		Bokslut från LM	Göran Palm	Sweden
1975	Longlist		Vinteride	Sven Delblanc	Sweden
1976	Winner		Að laufferjum and Að brunnum	Ólafur Jóhann Sigurðsson	Iceland
1976	Longlist		Delfinen. Miljødigte 1970-75	Thorkild Bjørnvig	Denmark
1976	Longlist		Dinosaurusens sene eftermiddag	Peter Seeberg	Denmark
1976	Longlist		Dyre prins	Christer Kihlman	Finland
1976	Longlist		Kotimaa	Alpo Ruuth	Finland
1976	Longlist		Lifandi vatnið	Jakobína Sigurðardóttir	Iceland
1976	Longlist		Fortellinger om frihet	Bjørg Vik	Norway
1976	Longlist		Pusteøvelse	Rolf Jacobsen	Norway
1976	Longlist		Blåvalen	Werner Aspenström	Sweden
1976	Longlist		Häxringarna	Kerstin Ekman	Sweden
1977	Winner		I de mörka rummen, i de ljusa	Bo Carpelan	Finland
1977	Longlist		Mit hjerte i København, Jatháram and Regnansigt	Jørgen Gustava Brandt	Denmark
1977	Longlist		Tugt og utugt i mellemtiden 1, 2	Svend Åge Madsen	Denmark
1977	Longlist		Kökar	Ulla-Lena Lundberg	Finland
1977	Longlist		Eftirþankar Jóhönnu	Vésteinn Lúðvíksson	Iceland
1977	Longlist		Fuglaskottís	Thor Vilhjálmsson	Iceland
1977	Longlist		Inn i din tid	Sigurd Evensmo	Norway
1977	Longlist		Uår. Sweetwater	Knut Faldbakken	Norway
1977	Longlist	Children's Island	Barnens ö	P. C. Jersild	Sweden
1977	Longlist		Det omöjliga	Göran Sonnevi	Sweden
1978	Winner		Dalen Portland	Kjartan Fløgstad	Norway
1978	Longlist		Den hårde frugt	Tage Skou-Hansen	Denmark
1978	Longlist		Salamander	Elsa Gress	Denmark
1978	Longlist		Det har aldrig hänt	Ralf Nordgren	Finland
1978	Longlist		Tanssilattia vuorella	Pentti Saarikoski	Finland
1978	Longlist		Fátækt fólk	Tryggvi Emilsson	Iceland
1978	Longlist		Mánasigð	Thor Vilhjálmsson	Iceland
1978	Longlist		Det trettende stjernebilde	Stein Mehren	Norway
1978	Longlist		Din tjänare hör	Sara Lidman	Sweden
1978	Longlist		Slutförbannelser	Elsa Grave	Sweden
1979	Winner		Pubertet	Ivar Lo-Johansson	Sweden
1979	Longlist		De rejsende	Ole Sarvig	Denmark
1979	Longlist		Tilbage til Anholt	Vagn Lundbye	Denmark
1979	Longlist		J. L. Runeberg och hans vänner	Lars Huldén	Finland
1979	Longlist		Valkoinen kaupunki	Jorma Ojaharju	Finland
1979	Longlist		Fátækt fólk and Baráttan um brauðið	Tryggvi Emilsson	Iceland
1979	Longlist		Fiðrið úr sæng Daladrottningar	Þorsteinn frá Hamri	Iceland
1979	Longlist		S	Jan Erik Vold	Norway
1979	Longlist		Sønn av jord og himmel	Kåre Holt	Norway
1979	Longlist	House of Babel	Babels hus	P. C. Jersild	Sweden
1980	Winner		Vredens barn	Sara Lidman	Sweden
1980	Longlist		Hvis det virkelig var en film	Dorrit Willumsen	Denmark
1980	Longlist		Jorden under himlen	Erik Stinus	Denmark
1980	Longlist		Kuin kekäle kädessä	Eeva Joenpelto	Finland
1980	Longlist		Kansakunnan linja: kommentteja erään tuntemattoman kansan tuntemattomaan historiaan 1904-1975	Paavo Haavikko	Finland
1980	Longlist		Einkamál Stefaníu	Ása Sólveig	Iceland
1980	Longlist		Vatn á myllu kölska	Ólafur Haukur Símonarson	Iceland
1980	Longlist		En håndfull lengsel	Bjørg Vik	Norway
1980	Longlist		Pieter og jeg	Odd Eidem	Norway
1980	Longlist		Språk; verktyg; eld	Göran Sonnevi	Sweden
1981	Winner		Hauströkkrið yfir mér	Snorri Hjartarson	Iceland
1981	Longlist		Evas Ekko	Cecil Bødker	Denmark
1981	Longlist		Vinterens hjerte	Ivan Malinowski	Denmark
1981	Longlist		Främlingsstjärnan	Irmelin Sandman Lilius	Finland
1981	Longlist		Sataa suolaista vettä	Eeva Joenpelto	Finland
1981	Longlist		Undir kalstjörnu	Sigurður A. Magnússon	Iceland
1981	Longlist		Den salte åkeren and Stiene fører til havet	Idar Kristiansen	Norway
1981	Longlist		Dikt i samling	Olav H. Hauge	Norway
1981	Longlist	A Living Soul	En levande själ	P. C. Jersild	Sweden
1981	Longlist		Tidigt en morgon sent på jorden	Werner Aspenström	Sweden
1982	Winner		Samuels bok	Sven Delblanc	Sweden
1982	Longlist		Imellem os	Bente Clod	Denmark
1982	Longlist		Vejen til Lagoa Santa	Henrik Stangerup	Denmark
1982	Longlist		Asiaa tai ei	Pentti Saarikoski	Finland
1982	Longlist		Tillkortakommanden	Claes Andersson	Finland
1982	Longlist		Heimkynni við sjó	Hannes Pétursson	Iceland
1982	Longlist		Sagan af Ara Fróðasyni og Hugborgu konu hans	Guðbergur Bergsson	Iceland
1982	Longlist		Den usynlige regnbuen	Stein Mehren	Norway
1982	Longlist		Huset med den blinde glassveranda	Herbjørg Wassmo	Norway
1982	Longlist		Gheel: de galnas stad	Per Odensten	Sweden
1983	Winner		Om fjorten dage	Peter Seeberg	Denmark
1983	Longlist		Alfabet	Inger Christensen	Denmark
1983	Longlist		Eteisiin ja kynnyksille	Eeva Joenpelto	Finland
1983	Longlist		Kejsarstaden	Barbara Winckelmann	Finland
1983	Longlist		Lífsjátning	Ingólfur Margeirsson	Iceland
1983	Longlist		Tveggja bakka veður	Matthías Jóhannessen	Iceland
1983	Longlist		Gymnaslærer Pedersens beretning om den store politiske vekkelsen som har hjemsøkt vårt land	Dag Solstad	Norway
1983	Longlist		Snart er det høst	Bjørg Vik	Norway
1983	Longlist		Evighetens barnbarn	Elsa Grave	Sweden
1983	Longlist	The Way of a Serpent	Ormens väg på hälleberget	Torgny Lindgren	Sweden
1984	Winner	The Christmas Oratorio	Juloratoriet	Göran Tunström	Sweden
1984	Longlist		Hvad nu	Ivan Malinowski	Denmark
1984	Longlist		Marie	Dorrit Willumsen	Denmark
1984	Longlist		Kaksoiskuva	Lassi Nummi	Finland
1984	Longlist		September	Tua Forsström	Finland
1984	Longlist		Gefið hvort öðru…	Svava Jakobsdóttir	Iceland
1984	Longlist		Spjótalög á spegil	Þorsteinn frá Hamri	Iceland
1984	Longlist		Dagen som forsvant	Tormod Haugen	Norway
1984	Longlist		Timenes time	Stein Mehren	Norway
1984	Longlist		En stad av ljus	Kerstin Ekman	Sweden
1985	Winner	A Day in Ostrobothnia	Pohjanmaa	Antti Tuuri	Finland
1985	Longlist		84 Digte	Henrik Nordbrandt	Denmark
1985	Longlist		Marias barn. Drengen and Marias barn. Manden	Cecil Bødker	Denmark
1985	Longlist		Eftirtorv	Regin Dahl	Faroe Islands
1985	Longlist		Under	Claes Andersson	Finland
1985	Longlist		36 ljóð	Hannes Pétursson	Iceland
1985	Longlist		New York	Kristján Karlsson	Iceland
1985	Longlist		Minner om Mirella	Eugene Schoulgin	Norway
1985	Longlist		Prøvetid	Edvard Hoem	Norway
1985	Longlist		Golgadeamen	Hans Aslak Guttorm	Sápmi
1985	Longlist		Bat Seba	Torgny Lindgren	Sweden
1985	Longlist		Honungsvargar	Sun Axelsson	Sweden
1986	Winner		Líkasum	Rói Patursson	Faroe Islands
1986	Longlist		Guldkuglen	Hanne Marie Svendsen	Denmark
1986	Longlist		Hjertets søle	Jess Ørnsbo	Denmark
1986	Longlist		Elämän evakkona	Eeva Kilpi	Finland
1986	Longlist		Hotelli eläville	Olli Jalonen	Finland
1986	Longlist		Gott er að lifa	Jón úr Vör	Iceland
1986	Longlist		Maður og haf	Vésteinn Lúðvíksson	Iceland
1986	Longlist		Nattåpent	Rolf Jacobsen	Norway
1986	Longlist		Stank av mennesker	Kolbjørn Brekstad	Norway
1986	Longlist		Dykungens dotter	Birgitta Trotzig	Sweden
1986	Longlist		Slaktarens hus	Karl Rune Nordkvist	Sweden
1987	Winner		Hudløs himmel	Herbjørg Wassmo	Norway
1987	Longlist		Requiem	Peer Hultberg	Denmark
1987	Longlist		Suk hjerte	Dorrit Willumsen	Denmark
1987	Longlist		Leikur tín er sum hin ljósi dagur	Jens Pauli Heinesen	Faroe Islands
1987	Longlist		Vattenhjulet	Solveig von Schoultz	Finland
1987	Longlist		Veljeni Sebastian	Annika Idström	Finland
1987	Longlist		Gulleyjan	Einar Kárason	Iceland
1987	Longlist		Sagan öll	Pétur Gunnarsson	Iceland
1987	Longlist		Ved foten av kunnskapens tre	Terje Stigen	Norway
1987	Longlist		Losses beaivegirji	Rauni Magga Lukkari	Sápmi
1987	Longlist		Sånger	Lars Forssell	Sweden
1987	Longlist		Sju vise mästare om kärlek	Lars Gyllensten	Sweden
1988	Winner	Justice Undone	Grámosinn glóir	Thor Vilhjálmsson	Iceland
1988	Longlist		Hva’for en hånd vil du ha’	Vita Andersen	Denmark
1988	Longlist		Under mausolæet	Henrik Nordbrandt	Denmark
1988	Longlist		Tjøraðu plankarnir stevna inn í dreymin	Jóanes Nielsen	Faroe Islands
1988	Longlist		Gerdt Bladhs undergång	Christer Kihlman	Finland
1988	Longlist		Tainaron	Leena Krohn	Finland
1988	Longlist		Tímaþjófurinn	Steinunn Sigurðardóttir	Iceland
1988	Longlist		Ave Eva	Edvard Hoem	Norway
1988	Longlist		Gobi. Djengis Khan	Tor Åge Bringsværd	Norway
1988	Longlist		Ruoktu váimmus	Nils-Aslak Valkeapää	Sápmi
1988	Longlist		Barnsben	Lars Ardelius	Sweden
1988	Longlist		Svarta villan	Ernst Brunner	Sweden
1989	Winner		Roman 1987	Dag Solstad	Norway
1989	Longlist		Gå om bag spejlet	Rolf Gjedsted	Denmark
1989	Longlist		Rejsens bevægelser	Jens Christian Grøndahl	Denmark
1989	Longlist		Hús úr ljóði	Gunnar Hoydal	Faroe Islands
1989	Longlist		Jär	Gösta Ågren	Finland
1989	Longlist		Unohdettu vartti	Rosa Liksom	Finland
1989	Longlist		Dagur vonar	Birgir Sigurðsson	Iceland
1989	Longlist		Tengsl	Stefán Hörður Grímsson	Iceland
1989	Longlist		Hvem har ditt ansikt?	Liv Køltzow	Norway
1989	Longlist		Byron	Sigrid Combüchen	Sweden
1989	Longlist		Din livsfrukt	Lars Ahlin	Sweden
1990	Winner	For the Living and the Dead	För levande och döda	Tomas Tranströmer	Sweden
1990	Longlist		Præludier	Peer Hultberg	Denmark
1990	Longlist		Vandspejlet	Henrik Nordbrandt	Denmark
1990	Longlist		Ett sätt att räkna tiden	Solveig von Schoultz	Finland
1990	Longlist		Väliasema Gagarin	Rosa Liksom	Finland
1990	Longlist		Dagur af degi	Matthías Jóhannessen	Iceland
1990	Longlist		Gunnlaðar saga	Svava Jakobsdóttir	Iceland
1990	Longlist		Den guddommelige tragedie	Bergljot Hobæk Haff	Norway
1990	Longlist		Gobi. Djevelens skinn og ben	Tor Åge Bringsværd	Norway
1990	Longlist	The Sun, My Father	Beaivi, áhčážan	Nils-Aslak Valkeapää	Sápmi
1990	Longlist		Kråkorna skrattar	Ragnar Thoursie	Sweden
1991	Winner	The Sun, My Father	Beaivi, áhčážan	Nils-Aslak Valkeapää	Sápmi
1991	Longlist		Fortællinger om natten	Peter Høeg	Denmark
1991	Longlist		Mellem himmel og jord	Svend Åge Madsen	Denmark
1991	Longlist		Hvørkiskyn	Carl Jóhan Jensen	Faroe Islands
1991	Longlist		Städren	Gösta Ågren	Finland
1991	Longlist		Talvisodan aika	Eeva Kilpi	Finland
1991	Longlist		Nunanni Avani	Hans Anthon Lynge	Greenland
1991	Longlist		Bréfbátarigningin	Gyrðir Elíasson	Iceland
1991	Longlist		Hringsól	Álfrún Gunnlaugsdóttir	Iceland
1991	Longlist		Fader Armod	Arvid Hanssen	Norway
1991	Longlist		Meditasjonar over Georges de la Tour	Paal-Helge Haugen	Norway
1991	Longlist		Endagsvarelser	Lars Norén	Sweden
1991	Longlist		Knivkastarens kvinna	Kerstin Ekman	Sweden
1992	Winner	Night Watch	Meðan nóttin liður	Fríða Á. Sigurðardóttir	Iceland
1992	Longlist		Hjemfalden	Søren Ulrik Thomsen	Denmark
1992	Longlist		Sneglehuset	Anne Marie Ejrnæs	Denmark
1992	Longlist		Johan ja Johan	Olli Jalonen	Finland
1992	Longlist		Stora världen	Ulla-Lena Lundberg	Finland
1992	Longlist		Nunaga siunissat qanoq ippa?	Frederik Nielsen	Greenland
1992	Longlist		Vatns götur og blóðs	Þorsteinn frá Hamri	Iceland
1992	Longlist		Et stort øde landskap	Kjell Askildsen	Norway
1992	Longlist		Seierherrene	Roy Jacobsen	Norway
1992	Longlist		Den goda viljan	Ingmar Bergman	Sweden
1992	Longlist		Trädet	Göran Sonnevi	Sweden
1993	Winner		Byen og verden	Peer Hultberg	Denmark
1993	Longlist		Breve	Jens Smærup Sørensen	Denmark
1993	Longlist		Undir suðurstjørnum	Gunnar Hoydal	Faroe Islands
1993	Longlist		Isäksi ja tyttäreksi	Olli Jalonen	Finland
1993	Longlist		Parkerna	Tua Forsström	Finland
1993	Longlist		Taallat: niviugak aalakoortoq allallu	Mariane Petersen	Greenland
1993	Longlist		Nú eru aðrir tímar	Ingibjörg Haraldsdóttir	Iceland
1993	Longlist	The Swan	Svanurinn	Guðbergur Bergsson	Iceland
1993	Longlist		Nattsol	Stein Mehren	Norway
1993	Longlist		Renhetens pris	Bergljot Hobæk Haff	Norway
1993	Longlist		Biekkakeahtes bálggis	Synnøve Persen	Sápmi
1993	Longlist		Att läsa Proust	Olof Lagercrantz	Sweden
1993	Longlist		Utrota varenda jävel	Sven Lindqvist	Sweden
1994	Winner	Blackwater	Händelser vid vatten	Kerstin Ekman	Sweden
1994	Longlist		De måske egnede	Peter Høeg	Denmark
1994	Longlist		Transparence	Suzanne Brøgger	Denmark
1994	Longlist		Kirkjurnar á havsins botni	Jóanes Nielsen	Faroe Islands
1994	Longlist		Sibirien. Ett självporträtt med vingar	Ulla-Lena Lundberg	Finland
1994	Longlist		Tummien perhosten koti	Leena Lander	Finland
1994	Longlist		Blandt mennesker mig nærmest	Frederik Kristensen	Greenland
1994	Longlist		Ljóð námu völd	Sigurður Pálsson	Iceland
1994	Longlist		Stúlkan í skóginum	Vigdís Grímsdóttir	Iceland
1994	Longlist		Øyets sult	Tove Nilsen	Norway
1994	Longlist		Ungdom	Arild Nyquist	Norway
1994	Longlist		Ty	Werner Aspenström	Sweden
1995	Winner	Angels of the Universe	Englar alheimsins	Einar Már Guðmundsson	Iceland
1995	Longlist		Høstnætter	Christian Skov	Denmark
1995	Longlist		Territorialsang	Pia Tafdrup	Denmark
1995	Longlist		Bláfelli	Jens Pauli Heinesen	Faroe Islands
1995	Longlist		Elävien kirjoissa	Arto Melleri	Finland
1995	Longlist		Korpfolksungen	Irmelin Sandman Lilius	Finland
1995	Longlist		Hvatt að rúnum	Álfrún Gunnlaugsdóttir	Iceland
1995	Longlist		ABC	Bjørn Aamodt	Norway
1995	Longlist		Omvei til Venus	Torgeir Schjerven	Norway
1995	Longlist		Boken om E	Ulla Isaksson	Sweden
1995	Longlist		Tankarna	Katarina Frostenson	Sweden
1996	Winner		Hva skal vi gjøre i dag og andre noveller	Øystein Lønn	Norway
1996			1001 digt	Klaus Høeck	Denmark
1996			Brev til månen	Ib Michael	Denmark
1996			Reglur	Tóroddur Poulsen	Faroe Islands
1996			Charlie Boy	Johan Bargum	Finland
1996			Harjunpää ja rakkauden nälkä	Matti Yrjänä Joensuu	Finland
1996			Grandavegur 7	Vigdís Grímsdóttir	Iceland
1996			Heimskra manna ráð and Kvikasilfur	Einar Kárason	Iceland
1996			Rubato	Lars Amund Vaage	Norway
1996		Sweetness	Hummelhonung	Torgny Lindgren	Sweden
1996		Chronicler of the Winds	Comédia infantil	Henning Mankell	Sweden
1997	Winner		Bang. En roman om Herman Bang	Dorrit Willumsen	Denmark
1997	Longlist		På sidelinjen	Tage Skou-Hansen	Denmark
1997	Longlist		En lycklig mänska	Claes Andersson	Finland
1997	Longlist		Tulkoon myrsky	Leena Lander	Finland
1997	Longlist		Iluliarsuit oqquanni	Karl Siegstad	Greenland
1997	Longlist		Hjartastaður	Steinunn Sigurðardóttir	Iceland
1997	Longlist		Kyrjálaeiði	Hannes Sigfússon	Iceland
1997	Longlist		Slik sett	Eldrid Lunden	Norway
1997	Longlist		Til Sibir	Per Petterson	Norway
1997	Longlist		Sammanhang. Material	Birgitta Trotzig	Sweden
1997	Longlist		Vid budet att Santo Bambino di Aracoeli slutligen stulits av maffian	Jesper Svenbro	Sweden
1998	Winner	After Having Spent a Night Among Horses	Efter att ha tillbringat en natt bland hästar	Tua Forsström	Finland
1998	Longlist		Bannister	Kirsten Hammann	Denmark
1998	Longlist		Pjaltetider	Peter Laugesen	Denmark
1998	Longlist		Tímar og rek	Carl Jóhan Jensen	Faroe Islands
1998	Longlist		Kadonnut Pariisi	Markus Nummi	Finland
1998	Longlist		Isuma	Aqqaluk Lynge	Greenland
1998	Longlist		Vötn þín og vængur	Matthías Jóhannessen	Iceland
1998	Longlist		Þorvaldur víðförli	Árni Bergmann	Iceland
1998	Longlist		Anchorage	Bjørn Aamodt	Norway
1998	Longlist		Blinddøra	Hans Herbjørnsrud	Norway
1998	Longlist		Bonán bonán soga suonaid	Ristin Sokki	Sápmi
1998	Longlist		Fågeljägarna	Lennart Sjögren	Sweden
1998	Longlist		Huset vid Flon	Kjell Johansson	Sweden
1999	Winner	Queen's Gate	Dronningeporten	Pia Tafdrup	Denmark
1999			Jeg har set verden begynde and Jeg har hørt et stjerneskud	Carsten Jensen	Denmark
1999			Pentur	Jóanes Nielsen	Faroe Islands
1999			Diva	Monika Fagerholm	Finland
1999			Naurava neitsyt	Irja Rane	Finland
1999			Uumasoqat	Ole Korneliussen	Greenland
1999			101 Reykjavík	Hallgrímur Helgason	Iceland
1999			Brotahöfuð	Þórarinn Eldjárn	Iceland
1999			Hutchinsons Eftf.	Geir Pollen	Norway
1999			Storytellers: en begrunnet antologi	Jan Erik Vold	Norway
1999			Klangernas bok	Göran Sonnevi	Sweden
1999			Personkrets 3:1	Lars Norén	Sweden
2000	Winner		Drømmebroer	Henrik Nordbrandt	Denmark
2000	Longlist		Americas	Thomas Boberg	Denmark
2000	Longlist		Faustus	Paavo Rintala	Finland
2000	Longlist		Tystnader, ljud	Peter Sandelin	Finland
2000	Longlist		Seeredaaq allallu	Jørgen Fleischer	Greenland
2000	Longlist		Elskan mín ég dey	Kristín Ómarsdóttir	Iceland
2000	Longlist		Faðir og móðir og dulmagn	Guðbergur Bergsson	Iceland
2000	Longlist		Ars vivendi, eller De syv levemåter	Georg Johannesen	Norway
2000	Longlist		Bikubesong	Frode Grytten	Norway
2000	Longlist		Jag smyger förbi en yxa	Beate Grimsrud	Sweden
2000	Longlist		Korallen	Katarina Frostenson	Sweden
2001	Winner	The Discoverer	Oppdageren	Jan Kjærstad	Norway
2001	Longlist		Bonsai	Kirsten Thorup	Denmark
2001	Longlist		Sejd	Suzanne Brøgger	Denmark
2001	Longlist		Í morgin er aftur ein dagur	Oddvør Johansen	Faroe Islands
2001	Longlist		Kiltin yön lahjat	Mari Mörö	Finland
2001	Longlist		Vådan av att vara Skrake	Kjell Westö	Finland
2001	Longlist		Allaqqitat	Hans Anthon Lynge	Greenland
2001	Longlist		Stúlka með fingur	Þórunn Valdimarsdóttir	Iceland
2001	Longlist		Sumarið bakvið Brekkuna	Jón Kalman Stefánsson	Iceland
2001	Longlist	Morning and Evening	Morgon og kveld	Jon Fosse	Norway
2001	Longlist		Galbma rádná	Rose-Marie Huuva	Sápmi
2001	Longlist	Popular Music from Vittula	Populärmusik från Vittula	Mikael Niemi	Sweden
2001	Longlist		Lord Nevermore	Agneta Pleijel	Sweden
2002	Winner	The Half Brother	Halvbroren	Lars Saabye Christensen	Norway
2002	Longlist		In nomine	Klaus Høeck	Denmark
2002	Longlist		Kejserens atlas	Ib Michael	Denmark
2002	Longlist		Blóðroyndir	Tóroddur Poulsen	Faroe Islands
2002	Longlist		Marsipansoldaten	Ulla-Lena Lundberg	Finland
2002	Longlist		Pomo:n lumo	Kari Aronpuro	Finland
2002	Longlist		Saltstøtten	Ole Korneliussen	Greenland
2002	Longlist		Gula húsið	Gyrðir Elíasson	Iceland
2002	Longlist		Heimsins heimskasti pabbi	Mikael Torfason	Iceland
2002	Longlist		Vi vet så mye	Hans Herbjørnsrud	Norway
2002	Longlist		Suoláduvvon	Kirsti Paltto	Sápmi
2002	Longlist		Du har inte rätt att inte älska mig	Peter Kihlgård	Sweden
2002	Longlist		I djuret	Eva Runefelt	Sweden
2003	Winner		Revbensstäderna	Eva Ström	Sweden
2003	Longlist		Auricula	Per Højholt	Denmark
2003	Longlist		Vinci, senere	Morten Søndergaard	Denmark
2003	Longlist		Pílagrímar	Hanus Kamban	Faroe Islands
2003	Longlist		Lang	Kjell Westö	Finland
2003	Longlist		Mansikoita marraskuussa	Pirjo Hassinen	Finland
2003	Longlist		Tarningup ilua	Kelly Berthelsen	Greenland
2003	Longlist		Hljóðleikar	Jóhann Hjálmarsson	Iceland
2003	Longlist		Yfir Ebrófljótið	Álfrún Gunnlaugsdóttir	Iceland
2003	Longlist		Det avbrutte bildet	Liv Køltzow	Norway
2003	Longlist		Ingen er så trygg i fare	Jørgen Norheim	Norway
2003	Longlist		Rönndruvan glöder	Stewe Claeson	Sweden
2004	Winner		Juoksuhaudantie	Kari Hotakainen	Finland
2004	Longlist		Det nye	Vibeke Grønfeldt	Denmark
2004	Longlist		Livet foreslår	Peter Nielsen	Denmark
2004	Longlist		Brúgvar av svongum orðum	Jóanes Nielsen	Faroe Islands
2004	Longlist		Eriks bok	Lars Sund	Finland
2004	Longlist		Oqaatsit Nunaat	Kristian Olsen Aaju	Greenland
2004	Longlist		Hvar sem ég verð	Ingibjörg Haraldsdóttir	Iceland
2004	Longlist		Ýmislegt um risafurur og tímann	Jón Kalman Stefánsson	Iceland
2004	Longlist		Frost	Roy Jacobsen	Norway
2004	Longlist		Trask	Inger Elisabeth Hansen	Norway
2004	Longlist		Máilmmis dása	Inger-Mari Aikio-Arianaick	Sápmi
2004	Longlist		Hej då, ha det så bra!	Kristina Lugn	Sweden
2004	Longlist		Ravensbrück	Steve Sem-Sandberg	Sweden
2005	Winner	The Blue Fox	Skugga-Baldur	Sjón	Iceland
2005	Longlist		Fra smørhullet	Kirsten Hammann	Denmark
2005	Longlist		Korstogets lille tabel	Simon Grotrian	Denmark
2005	Longlist		Eygnamørk	Tóroddur Poulsen	Faroe Islands
2005	Longlist	The American Girl	Den amerikanska flickan	Monika Fagerholm	Finland
2005	Longlist		Helene	Rakel Liehu	Finland
2005	Longlist		Stormur	Einar Kárason	Iceland
2005	Longlist	A Time to Every Purpose Under Heaven	En tid for alt	Karl Ove Knausgård	Norway
2005	Longlist		Imperiet lukker seg	Stein Mehren	Norway
2005	Longlist		Den jag aldrig var	Majgull Axelsson	Sweden
2005	Longlist		På era platser	Anna Hallberg	Sweden
2006	Winner	The Ocean	Oceanen	Göran Sonnevi	Sweden
2006	Longlist		Livsstil	Thomas Boberg	Denmark
2006	Longlist		Selvmordsaktionen	Claus Beck-Nielsen	Denmark
2006	Longlist		Mitt liv som Pythagoras	Fredrik Lång	Finland
2006	Longlist		Tammilehto	Asko Sahlberg	Finland
2006	Longlist		Den stille mangfoldighed	Julie Edel Hardenberg	Greenland
2006	Longlist		Fólkið i kjallaranum	Auður Jónsdóttir	Iceland
2006	Longlist		Karitas, án titils	Kristín Marja Baldursdóttir	Iceland
2006	Longlist		Mors og fars historie	Edvard Hoem	Norway
2006	Longlist		Pirolene i Benidorm	Øivind Hånes	Norway
2006	Longlist		Árbbolaččat 3	Jovnna-Ánde Vest	Sápmi
2006	Longlist		Skymning: gryning	Lotta Lotass	Sweden
2007	Winner		Drömfakulteten	Sara Stridsberg	Sweden
2007	Longlist		Et skridt i den riktige retning	Morten Søndergaard	Denmark
2007	Longlist		Førkrigstid	Kirsten Thorup	Denmark
2007	Longlist		Ó – søgur um djevulsskap	Carl Jóhan Jensen	Faroe Islands
2007	Longlist		Älvdrottningen	Eva-Stina Byggmästar	Finland
2007	Longlist		Lauluja mereen uponneista kaupungeista	Markku Paasonen	Finland
2007	Longlist		Rokland	Hallgrímur Helgason	Iceland
2007	Longlist		Sumarljós, og svo kemur nóttin	Jón Kalman Stefánsson	Iceland
2007	Longlist		Gå. Eller kunsten å leve et vilt og poetiskt liv	Tomas Espedal	Norway
2007	Longlist		Von Aschenbachs fristelse	Jan Jakob Tønseth	Norway
2007	Longlist		Skuovvadeddjiid gonagas	Sigbjørn Skåden	Sápmi
2007	Longlist		I en cylinder i vattnet av vattengråt	Ann Jäderlund	Sweden
2008	Winner	Baboon	Bavian	Naja Marie Aidt	Denmark
2008	Longlist		Merkedage	Jens Smærup Sørensen	Denmark
2008	Longlist		September í bjørkum sum kanska eru bláar	Carl Jóhan Jensen	Faroe Islands
2008	Longlist		Fredrika Charlotta född Tengström. En nationalskalds hustru	Merete Mazzarella	Finland
2008	Longlist		Mehiläispaviljonki. Kertomus parvista	Leena Krohn	Finland
2008	Longlist		Á eigin vegum	Kristín Steinsdóttir	Iceland
2008	Longlist		Sendiherrann	Bragi Ólafsson	Iceland
2008	Longlist		Gjestene	Merethe Lindstrøm	Norway
2008	Longlist		Innsirkling	Carl Frode Tiller	Norway
2008	Longlist		Meahci šuvas bohciidit ságat	Synnøve Persen	Sápmi
2008	Longlist		I ett förskingrat nu	Eva Runefelt	Sweden
2008	Longlist		Nu försvinner vi eller ingår	Birgitta Lillpers	Sweden
2009	Winner	I Curse the River of Time	Jeg forbanner tidens elv	Per Petterson	Norway
2009	Longlist		Havet er en scene	Ursula Andkjær Olsen	Denmark
2009	Longlist		Ned til hundene	Helle Helle	Denmark
2009	Longlist		Rot	Tóroddur Poulsen	Faroe Islands
2009	Longlist		Orgelbyggaren	Robert Åsbacka	Finland
2009	Longlist		Romeo ja Julia	Jari Järvelä	Finland
2009	Longlist		Sisamanik teqeqqulik	Mâgssánguaq Qujaukitsoq	Greenland
2009	Longlist		Afleggjarinn	Auður A. Ólafsdóttir	Iceland
2009	Longlist		Blysfarir	Sigurbjörg Þrastardóttir	Iceland
2009	Longlist		Herbarium	Øyvind Rimbereid	Norway
2009	Longlist		Efter arbetsschema	Johan Jönson	Sweden
2009	Longlist		Fält	Andrzej Tichý	Sweden
2010	Winner	Purge	Puhdistus	Sofi Oksanen	Finland
2010	Longlist		Børnene	Ida Jessen	Denmark
2010	Longlist		Fotorama	Peter Laugesen	Denmark
2010	Longlist		Í havsins hjarta	Gunnar Hoydal	Faroe Islands
2010	Longlist		Glitterscenen	Monika Fagerholm	Finland
2010	Longlist		Konur	Steinar Bragi	Iceland
2010	Longlist		Ofsi	Einar Kárason	Iceland
2010	Longlist		Imot kunsten (notatbøkene)	Tomas Espedal	Norway
2010	Longlist	My Struggle 1	Min kamp 1	Karl Ove Knausgård	Norway
2010	Longlist	The Emperor of Lies	De fattiga i Łódź	Steve Sem-Sandberg	Sweden
2010	Longlist		Vad hjälper det en människa om hon häller rent vatten över sig i alla sina dagar	Ann Jäderlund	Sweden
2011	Winner	Between the Trees	Milli trjánna	Gyrðir Elíasson	Iceland
2011			Blues från ett krossat världshus	Sonja Nordenswan	Åland
2011			Stigninger og fald	Josefine Klougart	Denmark
2011			Vågen	Harald Voetmann	Denmark
2011			Útsýni	Tóroddur Poulsen	Faroe Islands
2011			Flugtämjaren	Erik Wahlström	Finland
2011			Herra Darwinin puutarhuri	Kristina Carlson	Finland
2011			Kakiorneqaqatigiit	Kristian Olsen Aaju	Greenland
2011			Rennur upp um nótt	Ísak Harðarson	Iceland
2011			En dåre fri	Beate Grimsrud	Norway
2011			Innsirkling 2	Carl Frode Tiller	Norway
2011			Bárbmoáirras	Kerttu Vuolab	Sápmi
2011			Kolosseum	Anna Hallberg	Sweden
2012	Winner	Days in the History of Silence	Dager i stillhetens historie	Merethe Lindstrøm	Norway
2012	Longlist		Transportflotte Speer	Leo Löthman	Åland
2012	Longlist		Livliner	Vibeke Grønfeldt	Denmark
2012	Longlist		Skrevet på polsk	Janina Katz	Denmark
2012	Longlist		Gullgentan	Hanus Kamban	Faroe Islands
2012	Longlist		Carmen	Saila Susiluoto	Finland
2012	Longlist		I det stora hela	Gösta Ågren	Finland
2012	Longlist		Nittaallatut	Tungutaq Larsen	Greenland
2012	Longlist		Blóðhófnir	Gerður Kristný	Iceland
2012	Longlist		Svar við bréfi Helgu	Bergsveinn Birgisson	Iceland
2012	Longlist		Jimmen	Øyvind Rimbereid	Norway
2012	Longlist		Ruohta muzetbeallji ruohta	Rawdna Carita Eira	Sápmi
2012	Longlist		Flodtid	Katarina Frostenson	Sweden
2012	Longlist		Lacrimosa	Eva-Marie Liffner	Sweden
2013	Winner	The Prophets of Eternal Fjord	Profeterne i Evighedsfjorden	Kim Leine	Denmark
2013			Is	Ulla-Lena Lundberg	Åland
2013			Én af os sover	Josefine Klougart	Denmark
2013			Brahmadellarnir	Jóanes Nielsen	Faroe Islands
2013			Hytti nro 6	Rosa Liksom	Finland
2013			Piniartorsuit kinguaavi	Mariane Petersen	Greenland
2013			Konan við 1000º	Hallgrímur Helgason	Iceland
2013			Valeyrarvalsinn	Guðmundur Andri Thorsson	Iceland
2013			God morgen og god natt	Nils-Øivind Haagensen	Norway
2013			Krigen var min families historie	Ole Robert Sunde	Norway
2013			Savvon bálgáid louttastit	Sollaug Sárgon	Sápmi
2013			En storm kom från paradiset	Johannes Anyuru	Sweden
2013			Filosofins natt	Lars Norén	Sweden
2014	Winner	Mirage 38	Hägring 38	Kjell Westö	Finland
2014			Bygdebok	Johanna Boholm	Åland
2014			Mine møder med de danske forfattere	Claus Beck-Nielsen	Denmark
2014			Postkort til Annie	Ida Jessen	Denmark
2014			Fjalir	Tóroddur Poulsen	Faroe Islands
2014			Toivo	Henriikka Tavi	Finland
2014			Naleqqusseruttortut	Juaaka Lyberth	Greenland
2014			Illska	Eiríkur Örn Norðdahl	Iceland
2014			Ósjálfrátt	Auður Jónsdóttir	Iceland
2014			Bergeners	Tomas Espedal	Norway
2014			Camillas lange netter	Mona Høvring	Norway
2014			Kairos	Andrzej Tichý	Sweden
2014			Minnesburen	Eva Runefelt	Sweden
2015	Winner	Wakefulness, Olav's Dreams and Weariness	Andvake, Olavs draumar and Kveldsvævd	Jon Fosse	Norway
2015			Minkriket	Karin Erlandsson	Åland
2015			Avuncular. Onkelagtige tekster	Pia Juul	Denmark
2015			Hvis det er	Helle Helle	Denmark
2015			Hinumegin er mars	Sólrún Michelsen	Faroe Islands
2015			Transparente Blanche	Peter Sandström	Finland
2015			Terminaali	Hannu Raittila	Finland
2015			Homo sapienne	Niviaq Korneliussen	Greenland
2015			Fiskarnir hafa enga fætur	Jón Kalman Stefánsson	Iceland
2015			Skessukatlar	Þorsteinn frá Hamri	Iceland
2015			Bare et menneske	Kristine Næss	Norway
2015			Amas amas amasmuvvat	Niillas Holmberg	Sapmi
2015			Den andra kvinnan	Therese Bohman	Sweden
2015			Och natten viskade Annabel Lee	Bruno K. Öijer	Sweden
2016	Winner		Sånger och formler	Katarina Frostenson	Sweden
2016			Mirakelvattnet	Carina Karlsson	Åland
2016			Legacy	Klaus Høeck	Denmark
2016			Ming	Bjørn Rasmussen	Denmark
2016			Eg síggi teg betur í myrkri. Forspæl til ein gleðileik	Carl Jóhan Jensen	Faroe Islands
2016			Graniittimies	Sirpa Kähkönen	Finland
2016			Maskrosgudens barn	Sabine Forsblom	Finland
2016			Zombiet Nunaat	Sørine Steenholdt	Greenland
2016			Ástin ein taugahrúga. Enginn dans við Ufsaklett	Elisabet Kristín Jökulsdóttir	Iceland
2016			Þrír sneru aftur	Guðbergur Bergsson	Iceland
2016			De urolige	Linn Ullmann	Norway
2016			Historie om et ekteskap	Geir Gulliksen	Norway
2016			Savkkuhan sávrri sániid	Sara Margrethe Oskal	Sapmi
2016			I varje ögonblick är vi fortfarande vid liv	Tom Malmquist	Sweden
2017	Winner		Erindring om kærligheden	Kirsten Thorup	Denmark
2017			Jag är Ellen	Johanna Boholm	Åland
2017			Anteckningar om hö	Birgitta Lillpers	Sweden
2017			Djupa kärlek ingen	Ann Jäderlund	Sweden
2017			Arv og miljø	Vigdis Hjorth	Norway
2017			En fremstilling av vold i Norge	Henrik Nor-Hansen	Norway
2017			Frelsi	Linda Vilhjálmsdóttir	Iceland
2017			Og svo tjöllum við okkur í rallið: Bókin um Thor	Guðmundur Andri Thorsson	Iceland
2017			Sunnudagsland	Sissal Kampmann	Faroe Islands
2017			De tysta gatorna	Tomas Mikael Bäck	Finland
2017			Oneiron	Laura Lindstedt	Finland
2017			Vivian	Christina Hesselholdt	Denmark
2018	Winner		Ör	Auður Ava Ólafsdóttir	Iceland
2018	Longlist		Algot	Carina Karlsson	Åland
2018	Longlist		Tapeshavet	Gunnar D. Hansson	Sweden
2018	Longlist		Doften av en man	Agneta Pleijel	Sweden
2018	Longlist		Jeg har ennå ikke sett verden	Roskva Koritzinsky	Norway
2018	Longlist		Begynnelser	Carl Frode Tiller	Norway
2018	Longlist		Ljóð muna rödd	Sigurður Pálsson	Iceland
2018	Longlist		Illinersiorluni ingerlavik inussiviuvoq	Magnus Larsen	Greenland
2018	Longlist		Gudahøvd	Jóanes Nielsen	Faroe Islands
2018	Longlist		God morgon	Susanne Ringell	Finland
2018	Longlist		Ontto harmaa	Olli-Pekka Tennilä	Finland
2018	Longlist		Indigo	Vita Andersen	Denmark
2018	Longlist		Velsignelser	Caroline Albertine Minor	Denmark
2019	Winner		Efter Solen	Jonas Eika	Denmark
2019	Longlist		Det finns inga monster	Liselott Willén	Åland
2019	Longlist		Elín, ýmislegt	Kristín Eiríksdóttir	Iceland
2019	Longlist		Kóngulær í sýningargluggum	Kristín Ómarsdóttir	Iceland
2019	Longlist		Människan är den vackraste staden	Sami Said	Sweden
2019	Longlist		Arpaatit qaqortut	Pivinnguaq Mørch	Greenland
2019	Longlist		Nonsensprinsessans dagbok	Isabella Nilsson	Sweden
2019	Longlist		Tristania	Marianna Kurtto	Finland
2019	Longlist		Ii dát leat dat eana	Inga Ravna Eira	Sápmi
2019	Longlist		Där musiken började	Lars Sund	Finland
2019	Longlist		Jeg lever et liv som ligner deres	Jan Grue	Norway
2019	Longlist		de	Helle Helle	Denmark
2019	Longlist		Det er berre eit spørsmål om tid	Eldrid Lunden	Norway
2020	Winner		Vem dödade bambi?	Monika Fagerholm	Finland
2020	Longlist		Kláði	Fríða Ísberg	Iceland
2020	Longlist		Juolgevuođđu	Niillas Holmberg	Sápmi
2020	Longlist		Lifandilífslækur	Bergsveinn Birgisson	Iceland
2020	Longlist		Ikki fyrr enn tá	Oddfríður Marni Rasmussen	Faroe Islands
2020	Longlist		När vändkrets läggs mot vändkrets	Mikaela Nyman	Åland
2020	Longlist		W	Steve Sem-Sandberg	Sweden
2020	Longlist		Ihmettä kaikki	Juha Itkonen	Finland
2020	Longlist		Marginalia/Xterminalia	Johan Jönson	Sweden
2020	Longlist		Yahya Hassan 2	Yahya Hassan	Denmark
2020	Longlist		Vi er fem	Matias Faldbakken	Norway
2020	Longlist		HHV, FRSHWN. Dødsknaldet i Amazonas	Hanne Højgaard Viemose	Denmark
2020	Longlist		Den gode vennen	Bjørn Esben Almaas	Norway
2021	Winner		Naasuliardarpi	Niviaq Korneliussen	Greenland
2021	Longlist		Strega	Johanne Lykke Holm	Sweden
2021	Longlist		Renheten	Andrzej Tichý	Sweden
2021	Longlist		Gáhttára Iđit	Inga Ravna Eira	Sápmi
2021	Longlist		Er mor død	Vigdis Hjorth	Norway
2021	Longlist		Det uferdige huset	Lars Amund Vaage	Norway
2021	Longlist		Aðferðir til að lifa af	Guðrún Eva Mínervudóttir	Iceland
2021	Longlist		Um tímann og vatnið	Andri Snær Magnason	Iceland
2021	Longlist		Eg skrivi á vátt pappír	Lív Maria Róadóttir Jæger	Faroe Islands
2021	Longlist		Bolla	Pajtim Statovci	Finland
2021	Longlist		Autofiktiv dikt av Heidi von Wright	Heidi von Wright	Finland
2021	Longlist		Mit smykkeskrin	Ursula Andkjær Olsen	Denmark
2021	Longlist		Penge på lommen. Scandinavian Star. Del 1	Asta Olivia Nordenhof	Denmark
2022	Winner	On the Calculation of Volume	Om udregning af rumfang I, II and III	Solvej Balle	Denmark
2022	Longlist		Truflunin	Steinar Bragi	Iceland
2022	Longlist		Adam i Paradis	Rakel Haslund-Gjerrild	Denmark
2022	Longlist		Beaivváš mánát	Marry A. Somby	Sápmi
2022	Longlist		Jente, 1983	Linn Ullmann	Norway
2022	Longlist		Eunukki	Kristina Carlson	Finland
2022	Longlist		Löpa varg	Kerstin Ekman	Sweden
2022	Longlist		Hem	Karin Erlandsson	Åland
2022	Longlist		Röda rummet	Kaj Korkea-aho	Finland
2022	Longlist		Arkhticós Dolorôs	Jessie Kleemann	Greenland
2022	Longlist		Den dagen den sorgen	Jesper Larsson	Sweden
2022	Longlist		Dette er G	Inghill Johansen	Norway
2022	Longlist		Aprílsólarkuldi	Elísabet Jökulsdóttir	Iceland
2022	Longlist		Sólgarðurin	Beinir Bergsson	Faroe Islands
2023	Winner		Ihågkom oss till liv	Joanna Rubin Dranger	Sweden
2023			Qivittuissuit akornanniinnikuuvunga	Katrine Rasmussen Kielsen	Greenland
2023			Karmageitin and Gentukamarið	Marjun Syderbø Kjelnæs	Faroe Islands
2023			Den stora blondinens sista sommar	Peter Sandström	Finland
2023			En bok för Ingen	Isabella Nilsson	Sweden
2023			Musta peili	Emma Puikkonen	Finland
2023			Jaememe mijjen luvnie jeala	Anne-Grethe Leine Bientie and Bierna Leine Bientie	Sápmi
2023			Fanden tage dig. Beretning om et kvindedrab	Niels Frank	Denmark
2023			Forbryter og straff	Kathrine Nedrejord	Norway
2023			Kniven i ilden	Ingeborg Arvola	Norway
2023			Georg-komplekset	Kirsten Hammann	Denmark
2023			Laus blöð	Ragnar Helgi Ólafsson	Iceland
2023			Konsten att inte hitta sig själv på Bali	Zandra Lundberg	Åland
2023			Ljósgildran	Guðni Elísson	Iceland
2024	Winner	Walking Man	Fars rygg	Niels Fredrik Dahl	Norway
2024	Longlist		Hafni fortæller	Helle Helle	Denmark
2024	Longlist		Jordisk	Theis Ørntoft	Denmark
2024	Longlist		Vill du kyssa en rebell?	Eva-Stina Byggmästar	Finland
2024	Longlist		101 tapaa tappaa aviomies	Laura Lindstedt & Sinikka Vuola	Finland
2024	Longlist		Lívfrøðiliga samansetingin í einum dropa av havvatni minnir um blóðið í mínum æðrum	Kim Simonsen	Faroe Islands
2024	Longlist		Tól	Kristín Eiríksdóttir	Iceland
2024	Longlist		Jarðsetning	Anna María Bogadóttir	Iceland
2024	Longlist		Jeg plystrer i den mørke vinden	Maria Navarro Skarange	Norway
2024	Longlist		Leŋges hearggi Sáhčal fatnasa	Fredrik Prost	Sápmi
2024	Longlist		Minnen från glömskans städer	Gunnar Harding	Sweden
2024	Longlist		Nollamorfa	Johan Jönson	Sweden
2024	Longlist		För att ta sig ur en rivström måste man röra sig i sidled	Mikaela Nyman	Åland
2025	Longlist		Dødebogsblade	Madame Nielsen	Denmark
2025	Longlist		Insula	Thomas Boberg	Denmark
2025	Longlist		Rusetti	Anu Kaaja	Finland
2025	Longlist		Min psykiater	Milja Sarkola	Finland
2025	Longlist		Svørt orkidé	Vónbjørt Vang	Faroe Islands
2025	Longlist		Qaamarngup taartullu akisugunneri	Lisathe Møller	Greenland
2025	Longlist		Náttúrulögmálin	Eiríkur Örn Norðdahl	Iceland
2025	Longlist		Armeló	Þórdís Helgadóttir	Iceland
2025	Longlist		Under brosteinen, stranden!	Johan Harstad	Norway
2025	Longlist		I vårt sted	Arne Lygre	Norway
2025	Longlist		Goatnelle	Jalvvi Niillas Holmberg	Sápmi
2025	Longlist		Rubicon / Issos / Troja	Lotta Lotass	Sweden
2025	Longlist		Händelseboken	Andrzej Tichý	Sweden
2025	Longlist		Marconirummet	Carina Karlsson	Åland
