= Ida Jessen =

Danish writer

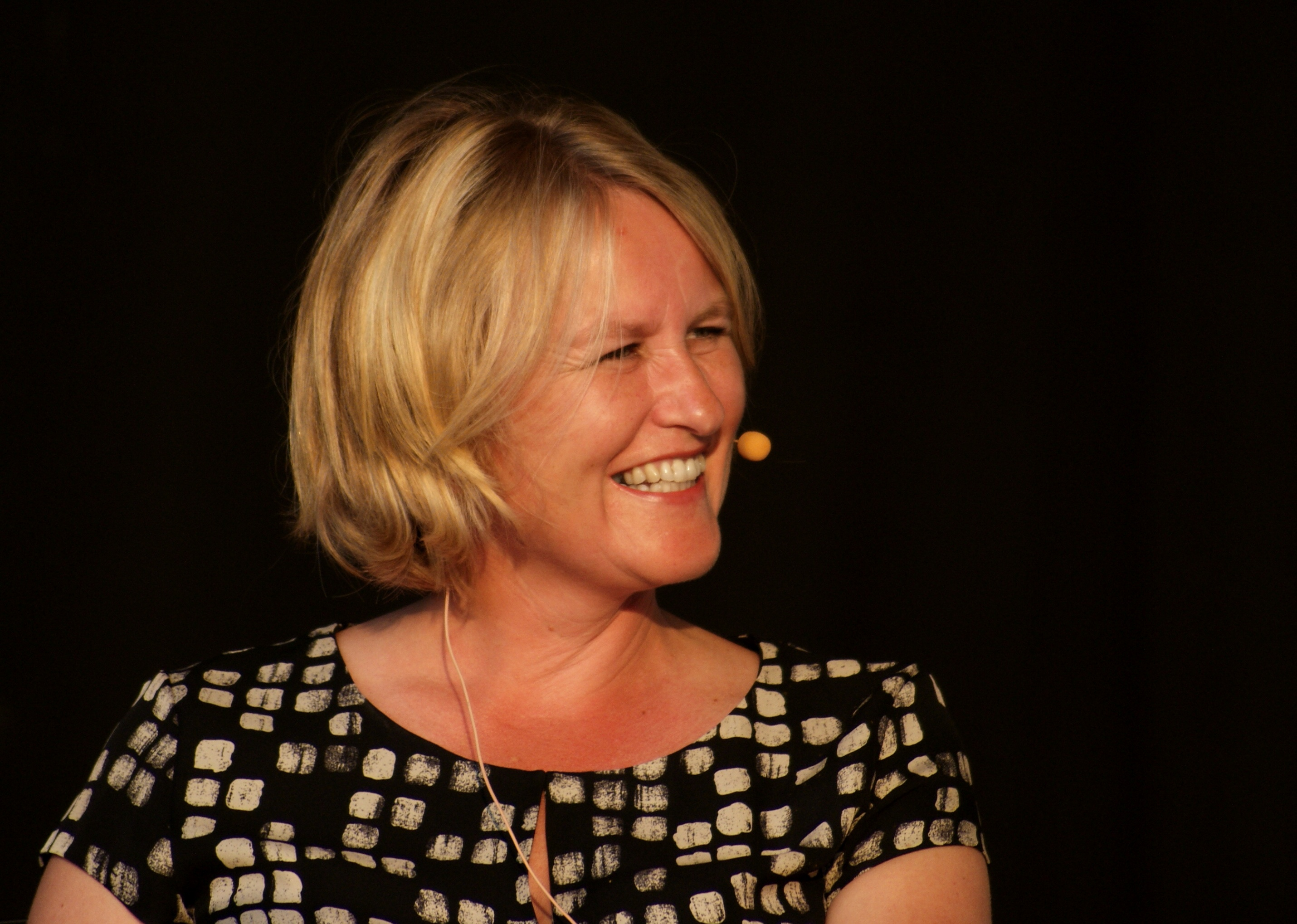
Ida Jessen in 2010

Ida Jessen (born 25 September 1964 in Sønderjylland) is a Danish author and translator who writes in both Danish and Norwegian. Jessen was nominated for the Nordic Council's Literature Prize and has won several awards for her work. She is a member of the Danish Academy and a recipient of the Lifetime Award from the Danish Arts Foundation.

== Biography ==
Jessen holds an M.A. in History of Literature and Communication from Aarhus University in 1990. She made her literary debut in 1989 with her first collection of short stories Under Sten (Under Stones) and has written a number of novels and short story collections for both children and adults. Jessen has translated a number of authors from Norwegian and English into Danish, including Alice Munro, Marilynne Robinson, Lars Saabye Christensen, and Karin Fossum.

== Selected works ==
- Under Sten (1989)
- Troldtinden (1994)
- Den der lyver (2001) - translated into English as The One Who's Lying (2011)
- Det første jeg tænker på (2006)
- Børnene (2009)
- Postkort til Annie (2013) - translated into English as Postcard to Annie (2022)
- En ny tid (2015) - translated into English as A Change of Time
- Kaptajnen og Ann Barbara (2022) - translated into English as The Captain and Ann Barbara, then serving as the basis for the film Bastarden (in English The Promised Land) (2023) .

== Awards ==
- Jytte Borberg Prize (2006)
- Søren Gyldendal Prize (2009)
- De Gyldne Laurbær (2009)
