= Night Watch (Sigurðardóttir novel) =

1992 novel by Fríða Á. Sigurðardóttir

- First edition
- Author: Fríða Á. Sigurðardóttir
- Original title: Meðan nóttin liður
- Language: Iceland
- Published: 1992
- Publisher: Forlagið
- Publication place: Iceland
- Awards: Nordic Council's Literature Prize of 1992

Night Watch (Icelandic: Meðan nóttin líður) is a 1992 novel by Icelandic author Fríða Á. Sigurðardóttir. It won the Nordic Council's Literature Prize in 1992.
