= Mona Høvring =

Norwegian writer (born 1962)

- Born: 8 October 1962 (age 63); Haugesund, Norway
- Occupations: Novelist; Poet
- Awards: Norwegian Critics Prize for Literature (2018)

Mona Høvring (born 8 October 1962), is a Norwegian writer, born in Haugesund. She was awarded the Norwegian Critics Prize for Literature for 2018.

== Career ==
Høvring made her literary debut in 1998 with the poetry collection IIK!! Ein dialog. She followed up with the collection Ensomme badedager og andre dikt in 2000. Her novel Noe som hjelper came in 2004, and further the poetry collections Helt vanlige mirakler in 2006, and Å Paradis in 2008. In 2012 she issued the novel Venterommet i Atlanteren, which has also been translated into French and Danish. Her novel Camillas lange netter from 2013 was shortlisted for the Nordic Council Literature Prize. She was awarded the Norwegian Critics Prize for Literature for best literary work for 2018, for her novel Fordi Venus passerte en alpefiol den dagen jeg blei født.

== Awards ==
- Språklig samlings litteraturpris (2012)
- Norwegian Critics Prize for Literature for best adult fiction (2018)
