= Hanne Marie Svendsen =

Danish writer

- Born: Hanne Marie Jensen; August 27, 1933 (age 92); Skagen, Denmark
- Occupations: Writer, broadcasting executive

Hanne Marie Svendsen (née Jensen, born 1933) is a Danish writer and former broadcasting executive. She has written works on Danish literature, plays and novels, including the award-winning Guldkuglen (1985), published in English as The Gold Ball in 1989.

== Early life and education ==
Born in Skagen in the north of Jutland on 27 August 1933, Svendsen was the daughter of the schoolteacher Ditlev Magnus Jensen and Ingeborg Bruun, a librarian. After matriculating in Frederikshavn in 1951, she studied Danish and German at the University of Copenhagen, receiving her cand.mag. in 1958. While at university, in 1954 she married the publisher and university lecturer Werner Svendsen (born 1930) with whom she was to have three children.

== Career ==
From 1960, Svendsen worked for the Danish broadcasting authority, Danmarks Radio, first as a programming assistant, later as deputy head of the Drama and Literature Department. From 1965 to 1970, she served as a lecturer at the University of Copenhagen. As a result of her work for Danmarks Radio, in 1962 she published a collection of essays titled På rejse ind i romanen (A Journey into the Novel) intended as an educational work for adults.

From the mid-1970s, Svendsen turned to fiction, publishing Mathildes drømmebog (Mathilde's Book of Dreams) in 1977. It was printed on paper in two shades, one for the day-to-day routine, the other for dreams and aspirations that gradually disappeared. It fitted nicely into the evolving women's literature of the decade, as did Dans under frostmånen (Dance under the Frosty Moon, 1979) and Klovnefisk (Clownfish, 1980), both of which took advantage of the move from inhibition.

Svendsen's reputation for fiction was finally sealed in 1985 with Guldkuglen (The Golden Ball) which brought her the Danish Critics Prize for Literature as well as a nomination for the Nordic Council's Literature Prize. It depicts the fantasy world of a mythical Danish island which grows from an isolated fishing village into a thriving marketplace, finally deteriorating into a wasteland overcome with pollution and red tides.

She went on to write the play Rosmarin og heksevin (Rosmarin and Witches Wine, 1987) in which a man's dreams of his partner deteriorate into an erotic relationship. In the novel Under solen (Under the Sun, 1991), the female protagonist murders her lover who is bent on transforming nature into a commercial centre for shopping and entertainment. Her accounts of deteriorating relationships between men and women or their aspirations to escape from everyday routine are repeated in Kaila på fyret (Kaila at the Lighthouse, 1987) and Karantæne (Quarantine, 1995).

Slightly more positive is her 1996 novel Rejsen med Emma in which the female narrator recounts a journey to South America on a cargo ship. She wants to sort out a love affair and write a novel based on a dialogue with one of Henrik Ibsen's plays but the trip is so eventful that the work is never completed. She then wrote two children's books, Den røde sten (The Red Stone, 1990) and Spejlsøster (Mirror Sister, 1995). The latter tells us the story of Naja, a little girl who spends the summer with her grandmother in Skagen where she becomes part of the world of the Skagen Painters, especially the paintings of Anna and Michael Ancher and their daughter Helga.

Her next book, the novel Ingen genvej til Paradis (No Shortcult to Paradise, 1999) describes the evolving relationships between members of a large family which contains has autobiographical connections with Svendsen's family and her upbringing in the north of Jutland. Considerable attention is given to the narrator's feelings for her mother. Set in the 15th century, Unn fra Stjernestene (2003) is about a girl in Greenland who is sent to a nunnery where she develops an interest in literature. She gets to know an explorer who travels to the far north of the country but she also shows considerable interest in the local sagas. Like Guldkuglen, it is one of her most successful novels.

Svendsen's most recent novel, Rudimenter af R (Rudiments of R, 2009), is about a Danish linguist "R" who, lying on his deathbed in Copenhagen, reflects on his past life. It is based on the diaries of Rasmus Rask (1787–1832) who in his day gained quite a reputation for his language research.

== Awards ==
Svendsen has received a number of awards, including:

- 1985: Danish Critics Prize for Literature
- 1985: Nomination for the Nordic Council Literature Prize
- 1987: Tagea Brandt Scholarship
- 1987: Herman Bangs Mindelegat (Hermann Bang Scholarship)
- 1998: Dansk Litteraturpris for Kvinder (Danish Literature Prize for Women)
- 2004: Danmarks Radios Romanpris (Danish Radio's Novel Prize)
- 2004: Drachmannlegatet
