= Jakobína Sigurðardóttir =

Icelandic writer (1918–1994)

Jakobína Sigurðardóttir (8 July 1918 – 29 January 1994) was an Icelandic writer.

The daughter of Sigurður Sigurðsson and Stefanía Guðnadóttir, she was born in Hælavík on the Hornstrandir peninsula and grew up there. Her sister Fríða Á. Sigurðardóttir was also a writer.

In 1959, she published her first children's book Sagan af Snæbjörtu Eldsdóttur og Ketilríði Kotungsdóttur. She is credited with being one of several Icelandic writers who introduced modernism into the Icelandic novel during the last 1960s and early 1970s.

Several of Sigurðardóttir's poems have been turned into songs. Jórunn Viðar; composed Vökuró ("Vigil") later performed by Björk. Jórunn Viðar also composed a song to the poem Vorljóð á Ýli. Then Bjarni Frímann Bjarnason and Guðmundur Óskar Guðmundsson wrote a song to the Christmas poem Jólakvæði in 2013. That appeared on Sigríður Thorlacius' Christmas album Jólakveðja.

She married Þorgrímur Starri Björgvinsson, a farmer, in 1949. The couple had four children.

== Selected works ==
- Kvæði (1960)
- Púnktur á skökkum stað, short stories (1964)
- Dægurvísa, novel (1965)
- Snaran, novel (1968)
- Sjö vindur gráar, short stories (1970)
- Lifandi vatnið, novel (1974)
- Í sama klefa, novel (1981)
- Vegurinn upp á fjallið, short stories (1990)
- Í barndómi, memoir (1994), published posthumously
