= Therese Bohman =

Swedish writer

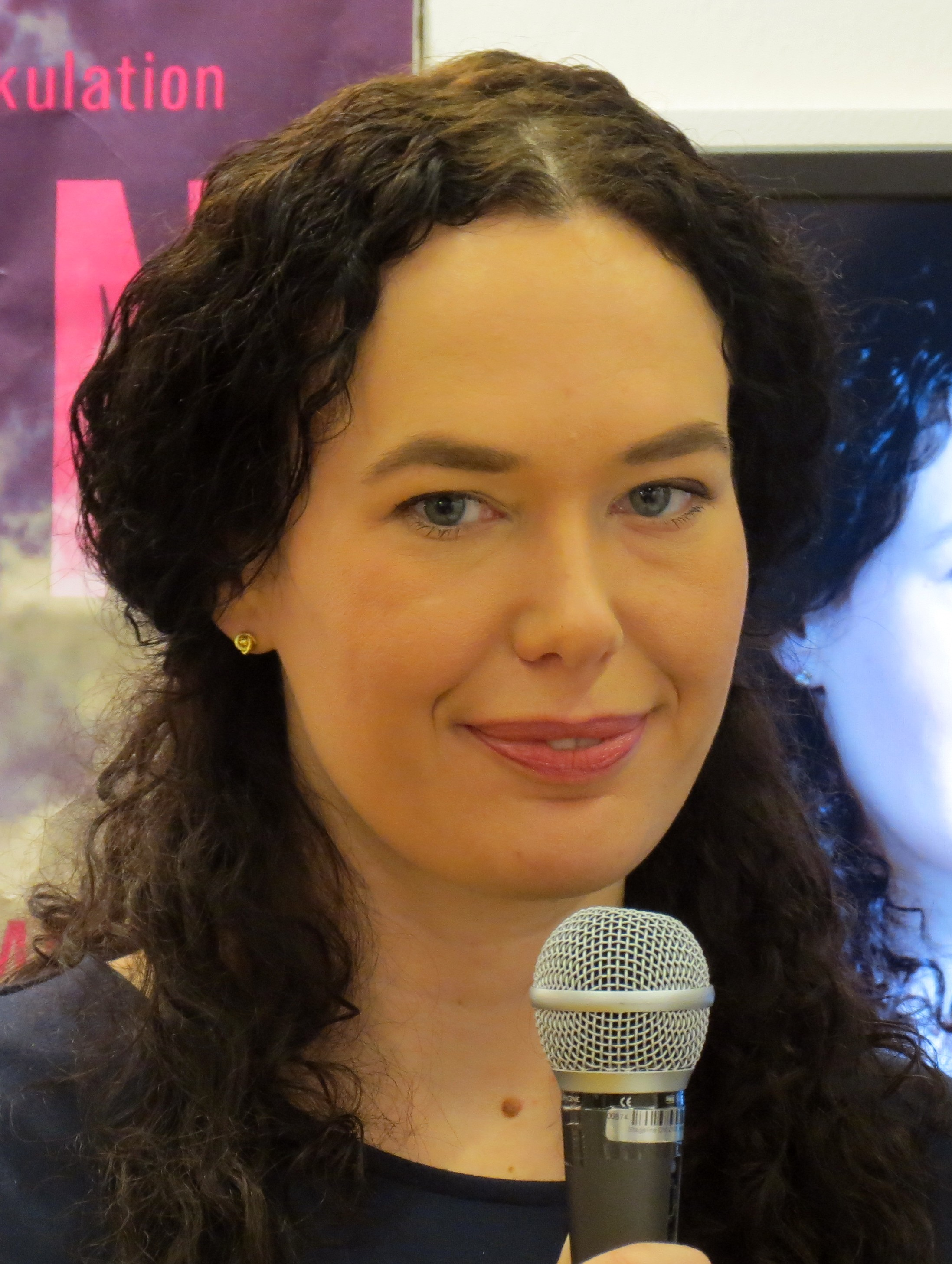
- Born: August 21, 1978; Krokek, Sweden
- Occupation: Writer
- Website: theresebohman.wordpress.com

Therese Bohman (born August 21, 1978) is a Swedish novelist and cultural journalist.

== Life ==
Bohman grew up in Kolmården, a town about 150 km south of Stockholm that is famous for its zoo, the Kolmården Wildlife Park. She has written that she visited the Kolmården zoo frequently as a child.

Bohman is an editor for a monthly magazine called Axess, and is also an art critic for the Swedish newspaper Expressen. In addition to her work for those publications, Bohman is a freelance writer about art, literature and fashion.

In 2010, Bohman's debut novel, Drowned, was published in Sweden and it was subsequently translated and published in France, Germany, Holland, Australia, New Zealand and the United States. Drowned was recommended by Oprah's Book Club.

== Interests and influences ==
Bohman has stated that her favorite author is Michel Houellebecq. Bohman said that Houellebecq's male protagonists "are cynical, bitter, even misogynic, but I feel a kind of tenderness for them, and I also feel that I understand them". Bohman has also said she is a "big fan" of Karl Ove Knausgaard.

As an art critic, Bohman has said that her artistic interests are similar to those of Kristina, the protagonist of her novel Eventide, in that she prefers nineteenth century, decadent and fin de siècle art, and is especially interested in how women are depicted in such works:

It is such a fascinating period of history with big changes in society and culture: Darwin's theories on evolution changed the way people thought about themselves and about God, secularization, urbanization, the women's and labour movements, a little later Freud and his theories about the unconscious. All these things made traces in the art from the period, and they are evident in the way women were depicted.

== Critical reception ==
Tara Cheesman-Olmsted reviewed Bohman's first two novels, Drowned and The Other Woman, in The Quarterly Conversation. Cheesman-Olmsted found remarkable similarities between the two works: "The books share so much in common that they might be the same novel: both explore almost identical situations, share many of the same structural and plot devices, and the author's and translator Marlaine Delargy’s prose styles remain the same from book to book."

The key similarity of Drowned and The Other Woman, Cheesman-Olmsted writes, is that they feature protagonists entangled with older men. Bohman, she writes, "channels the psyches of twenty-something University students engaged in liaisons with men already involved with other women…. Bohman’s treatment of them is inarguably sympathetic. Their affairs with men may be the impetus for coming-of-age journeys, but they do not represent a final destination."

Cheesman-Olmsted is laudatory of both novels, writing, "Therese Bohman strikes the right balance between lavish prose and simple storytelling—allowing her books to be both beautiful literary objects and vehicles which engage readers through larger ideas."

Writing in the Los Angeles Review of Books, Randy Rosenthal praised Eventide as "full of damn fine writing, but it’s the novel’s irreverent attitude toward feminism that makes it as challenging as it is necessary to read". Rosenthal noted that the main character, Karolina, was "well drawn", but questioned whether the novel could be sustained by the scant plot. Rosenthal concluded that "Karolina lives by her own terms, and that alone is a courageous kind of success."

Publishers Weekly described Eventide as "moving", going on to say that "[t]his psychologically rich journey provides insight into an intelligent, successful woman who burns with needs she fears she can’t fulfill." Kirkus Reviews called Bohman "an adroit novelist", and concluded in its review of Eventide by saying, that the book is "[i]ntelligent, impassioned, and compelling ... Bohman's latest explores complex inner worlds with great sensitivity and insight."

== Works ==
=== Novels ===
- Den drunknade (2010, trans. as Drowned by Marlaine Delargy, 2012)
- Den andra kvinnan (2014, trans. as The Other Woman by Marlaine Delargy, 2016)
- Aftonland (2016, trans. as Eventide by Marlaine Delargy, 2018)
- Andromeda (2022)
- Mount Verity (2026)

== See also ==
- Swedish literature
- Michel Houellebecq
- Karl Ove Knausgaard
- Axess magasin
- Expressen

== Sources ==
- Bohman, Therese (2012). "Curators of Sweden". @sweden. Archived from the original on 27 March 2019.
- Cheesman-Olmsted, Tara (14 March 2016). "Drowned and The Other Woman by Therese Bohman". The Quarterly Conversation. Archived from the original on 5 October 2018.
- Johnson, Michelle (10 April 2018). "Tell Me About a Complicated Woman: A Conversation with Therese Bohman". World Literature Today.
- "Review of Eventide". Kirkus Reviews. 23 January 2018.
- Nicholls, Shawn (9 April 2018). "An Interview with Therese Bohman, Author of Eventide". Other Press. Archived from the original on 27 March 2019.
- Newman, Leigh (20 June 2012). "Page Turners You'll Tear Through: Drowned by Therese Bohman". Oprah's Book Club.
- "Review of Eventide". Publishers Weekly. 11 June 2018.
- Rosenthal, Randy (13 April 2018). "Lamentations of the Woman: Irreverent Feminism in Therese Bohman's "Eventide"". Los Angeles Review of Books.
