= Jørgen Boberg =

Danish painter and illustrator (1940–2009)

Jørgen Boberg (24 October 1940 – 24 August 2009) was a self-taught Surrealist Danish painter and illustrator.

== Biography ==
Born in Roskilde, Boberg was a self-taught artist. After first exhibiting at the Artists Autumn Exhibition (Kunstneres Efterårsudstilling) in 1962, he was associated with Copenhagen's Galleri Passepartout and became a founding member of the Passepartout artists association in 1964. When in Paris in the mid-1960s, he became acquainted with Surrealistic painting which he interpreted in his own style. Boberg was a leading representative of Danish Surrealism, creating both figure paintings and landscapes with a high level of technical perfection. From 1973, he was a member of Grønningen. Towards the end of the 1980s, Boberg created strongly coloured paintings in a collage-like style combining pieces of food with pornography. He went on to depict a series of sensuous situations with photographic realism as a starting point, producing images combining engineering drawing with painting while addressing the tension between art and life.

In 2000, Boberg painted the portrait of Queen Margrethe.

Boberg lived in Pietrasanta in Italy for almost 30 years before returning to Denmark. He died in Odsherred in August 2009 after a long illness. His son Thomas is a successful poet and travel writer.

== Awards ==
In 1990, Boberg was awarded the Eckersberg Medal and, in 1999, the Thorvaldsen Medal.
