= Olli Jalonen =

Finnish author

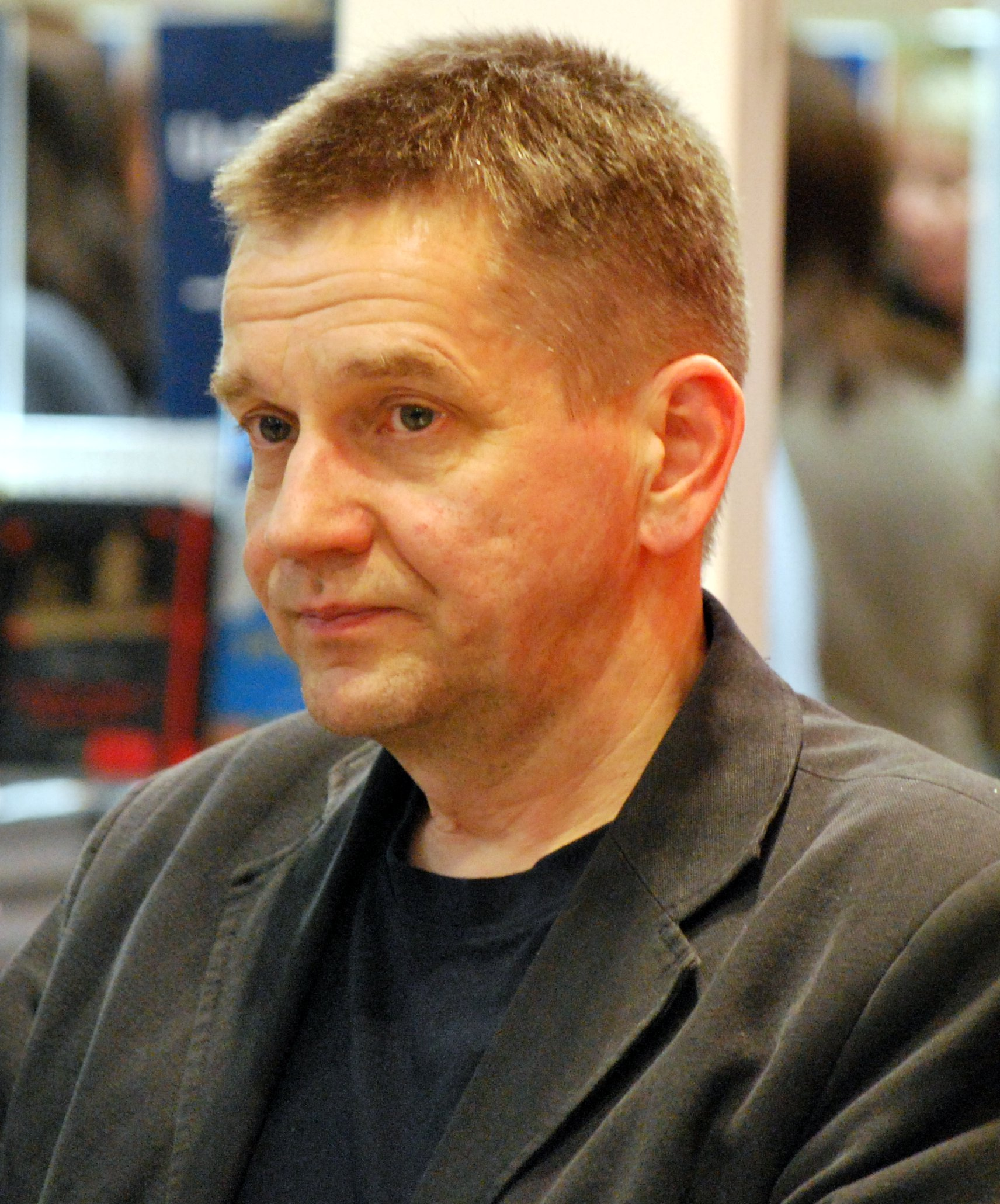

Olli Jalonen (born February 21, 1954, in Helsinki, is a Finnish author. His debut book was published in 1978 and since that he has published over 20 books (mostly novels and short story collections) and drama. Some of his novels have been translated into German, Swedish, Norwegian, Estonian and Latvian, and short stories in different languages.

== Biography ==
Jalonen lives in Hämeenlinna, Finland. He has studied Social Sciences (M.A. and L.Soc.Sc) and Literature (Ph.D) and has worked in journalism before becoming a full-time writer in 1981. Olli Jalonen studied at the University of Tampere 1973-2006 and also at Trinity College Dublin 1979–1980.

He took part in the International Writing Program IWP at the University of Iowa in 1982 and was the first Writer-in-Residence of Zurich, Switzerland, in 2010–2011. Olli Jalonen has received several literary awards since his debut book, including the Finlandia Fiction Prize in 1990 for his novel Isäksi ja tyttäreksi and again in 2018 for his novel Taivaanpallo, the J. H. Erkko Prize for the best debut book in 1978 and the Eino Leino Prize in 1990. He has had three nominations for the Nordic Council Literature Prize

It has been said that Olli Jalonen's writing shows a delight in playing with the nature of reality. One of the trademarks of his work as a prosewriter is his desire to bring together his earlier works to form part of new, larger entities, thus making his texts comment upon one another.

For decades he has been interested in the island of St. Helena and the astronomer and scientist Edmond Halley (1656-1742). For instance Jalonen's novel 14 solmua Greenwichiin (14 Knots to Greenwich, Otava 2008) centres on the story of a fictional round-the-world race by land and sea that starts and ends in Greenwich. It moves between suspense fiction and autobiography in an unusual and often enigmatic way. The novel Taivaanpallo (The Celestial Sphere, Otava 2018) tells about the rays of the Enlightenment and life on St. Helena and London in the 1680s. The story of Edmond Halley and his trusted apprentice Angus continues in Merenpeitto (The Art of Living under Water, Otava 2019).

== Works ==
=== Novels and short story collections ===
- Unien tausta. Helsinki: Otava. 1978. ISBN 951-1-04899-6.
- Sulkaturkki. Helsinki: Otava. 1979. ISBN 951-1-05540-2.
- Ilo ja häpeä. Helsinki: Otava. 1981. ISBN 951-1-06394-4.
- Hotelli eläville. Helsinki: Otava. 1983. ISBN 951-1-07472-5.
- Tuhkasaari. Helsinki: Otava. 1987. ISBN 951-1-09814-4.
- Johan ja Johan. Helsinki: Otava. 1989. ISBN 951-1-10895-6.
- Isäksi ja tyttäreksi. Helsinki: Otava. 1990. ISBN 951-1-11475-1.
- Elämä, ja elämä. Helsinki: Otava. 1992. ISBN 951-1-12178-2.
- Kenen kuvasta kerrot. Helsinki: Otava. 1996. ISBN 951-1-14394-8.
- Yksityiset tähtitaivaat. Helsinki: Otava. 1999. ISBN 951-1-15953-4.
- Yhdeksän pyramidia. Helsinki: Otava. 2000. ISBN 951-1-16639-5.
- Värjättyä rakkautta. Helsinki: Otava. 2003. ISBN 951-1-18841-0.
- 14 solmua Greenwichiin. Helsinki: Otava. 2008. ISBN 978-951-1-23014-4.
- Poikakirja. Helsinki: Otava. 2010. ISBN 978-951-1-24572-8.
- Karatolla. Helsinki: Otava. 2012. ISBN 978-951-1-26469-9.
- Miehiä ja ihmisiä. Helsinki: Otava. 2014. ISBN 978-951-1-28301-0.
- Taivaanpallo. Helsinki: Otava. 2018. ISBN 978-951-1-31917-7.
- Merenpeitto. Helsinki: Otava. 2019. ISBN 978-951-1-34512-1.

=== Other books ===
- Matkailijan Irlanti (Jalonen, Olli & Jalonen, Riitta). Helsinki: Otava. 1980. ISBN 951-1-05785-5.
- Kansa kulttuurien virroissa. Tuontikulttuurin suuntia ja sisältöjä Suomessa itsenäisyyden aikana. Helsinki: Otava. 1985. ISBN 951-1-08392-9.
- Kymmenen vuosituhatta. Kertomuksia suomalaisten historiasta (Ojanen, Eero & Jalonen, Olli). Jyväskylä: Atena. 1999. ISBN 951-796-175-8.
- Hitaasti kudotut nopeat hetket. Kirjoittamisen assosiaatiosta 1900-luvun suomalaisessa proosassa. Helsinki: Otava. 2006. ISBN 951-1-21007-6.
