= Thomas Boberg =

Danish writer (born 1960)

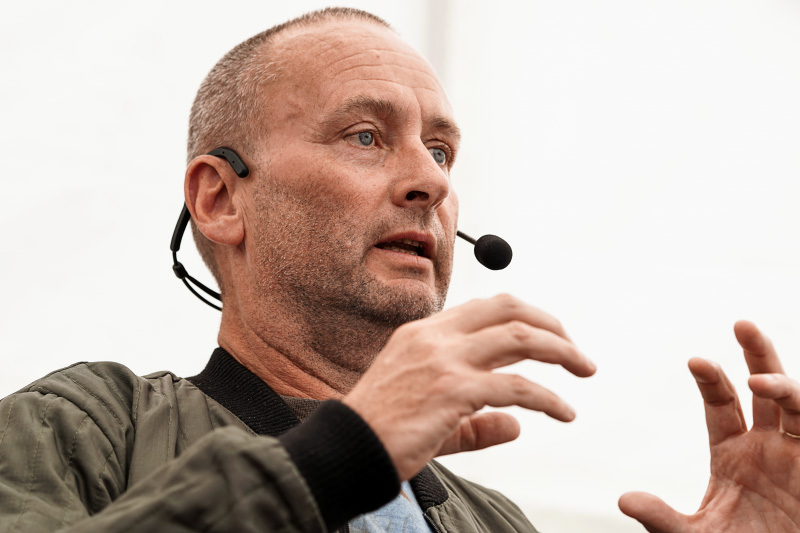
- Boberg at Literaturexchange Festival in Aarhus, Denmark, 2019
- Born: 5 May 1960 (age 66); Roskilde, Denmark
- Occupations: Poet, travel writer
- Writing career
- Notable works: Americas; Livsstil

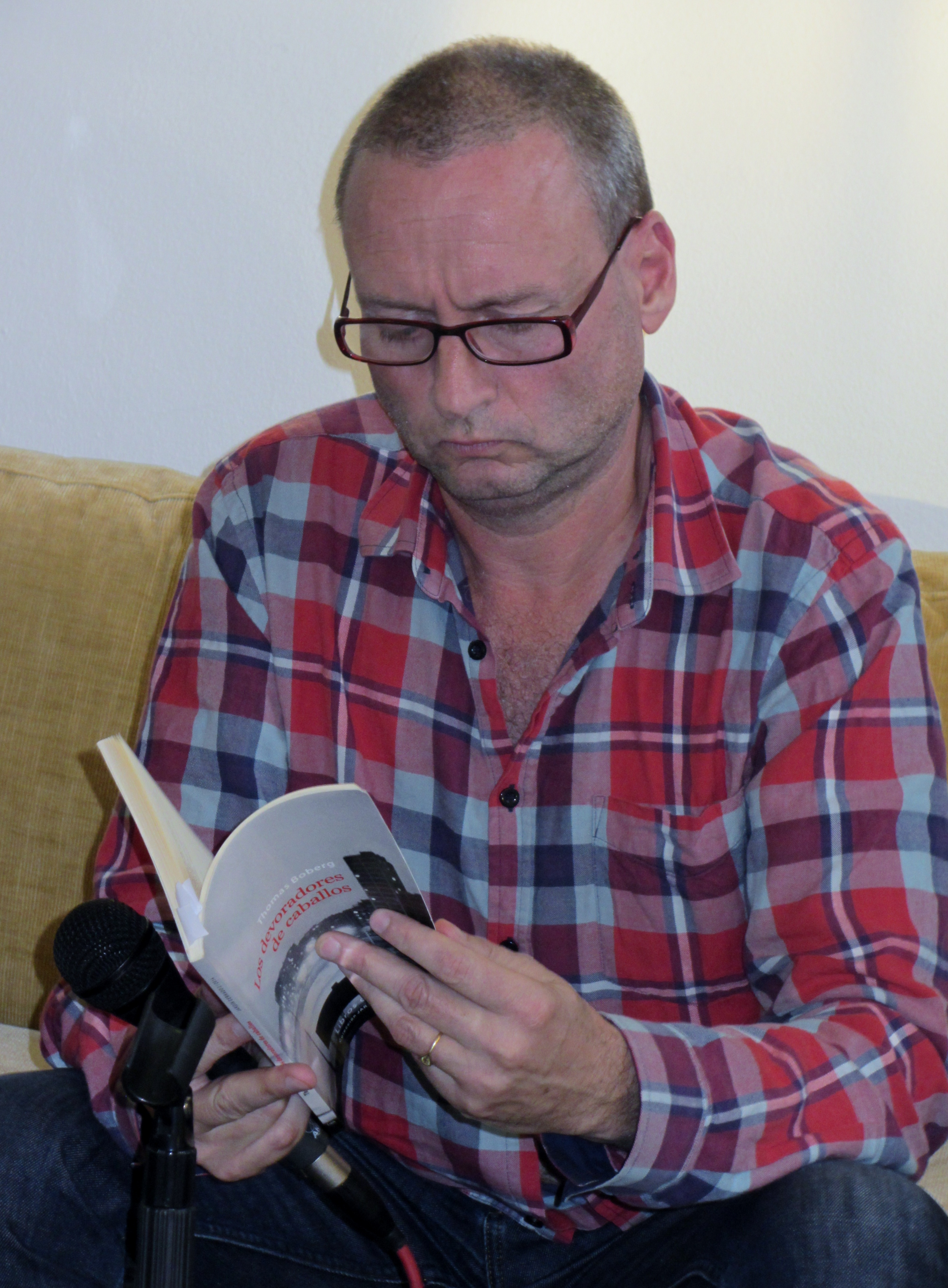
Boberg at the Santiago International Book Fair, 2015

Thomas Boberg (born 5 May 1960 in Roskilde) is a Danish poet and travel writer. Since his debut in 1984 he has received extensive recognition for his contribution to Danish literature. Since 2018 member of The Danish Academy (Det Danske Akademi).

Boberg lived in Peru for several years and has traveled widely in Latin America and Africa. Many of his works stem from his travels in South and Central America, often focusing on the exploited and poor. Boberg has been nominated twice for the Nordic Council's Literature Prize, in 1999 for Americas, and in 2006 for Livsstil (Life Style).

Thomas Boberg is the son of the surrealist painter Jørgen Boberg (1940–2009).

== Bibliography ==
- Hvæsende ved mit øjekast (1984) - poems
- Ud af mit liv (1985) - poems
- Hvid Glød (1986) - poems
- Slaggerdyret (1987) - poems
- Vor tids historie (1989) - poems
- Marionetdrømme (1991) - poems
- Vandbærere (1993) - poems
- Pelikanens Flugt (1994) - poems
- Sølvtråden (1996) - travel memoirs
- Under Hundestjernen (1997) - poems
- Marokkansk Motiv (1998) - with Simon Lautrop
- Americas (1999) - travel memoirs
- En stående aftale (2002) - poems
- Invitation til at rejse (2003) - travel memoirs
- Livsstil (2005) - poems
- Under Uret (2006) - short stories
- Gæstebogen (2007) - poems
- Flakker (2008) - novel
- Boothill (2009) - digte
- Hesteæderne (2010) – digte
- Hesteæderne II (2011) – digte
- I den næste by (2012) - rejseminder
- Fantombillede(2014) -digte
- Svanesang (2015) - digte
- Hesteæderne/Trilogien (2015) - digte
- Mexicocitydigte (2017) - digte
