= Josefine Klougart =

Danish novelist

- Born: 1985 (age 40–41); Copenhagen
- Education: Aarhus University
- Notable work: One of Us is Sleeping; Rise and Fall
- Awards: Nordic Council Literature Prize
- Website: https://josefineklougart.com/

Josefine Klougart (born 1985) is a Danish novelist living in Copenhagen. Klougart has studied Art and Literature at Aarhus University and graduated from the Danish Academy of Creative Writing in 2010. In 2017 she was introduced as guest professor at the University of Bern, Switzerland. Klougart has published 5 novels and three prose books.

Josefine Klougart's novels are translated internationally into 13 languages. Her first book Stigninger og Fald (Rise and Fall) received a nomination for the Nordic Council Literature Prize in 2011. Klougart's third novel Én Af os Sover (One of Us Is Sleeping) was nominated in 2016. Her November 2016 book New Forest was published in Denmark.

Josefine Klougart is a recipient of the Danish Royal Prize for Culture. Together with novelist Hans Otto Jørgensen and editor Jakob Sandvad, Klougart in 2010 co-founded the activist publishing house Forlaget Gladiator.

In 2016 Josefine Klougart co-published the book Your Glacial Expectations with the Icelandic artist Olafur Eliasson. Also in 2016, a section of Klougart's Darkness was translated from Danish by publisher Martin Aitken, appearing in the EuropeNow journal.

In 2023 Josefine Klougart's essay After Nature appeared as a detailed reading for The Glyptotek, Copenhagen.

== Works ==
=== Novels ===
- Stigninger og fald (Rise and Fall)
- Hallerne
- Én af os sover (One of us is sleeping)
- Om Mørke, Gladiator 2013 (Of Darkness, Deep Vellum Publishing 2017)
- New Forest

=== Prose books ===
- Den vind man manglede
- Regn
- Novilix
