= Ann Jäderlund =

Swedish poet and playwright (born 1955)

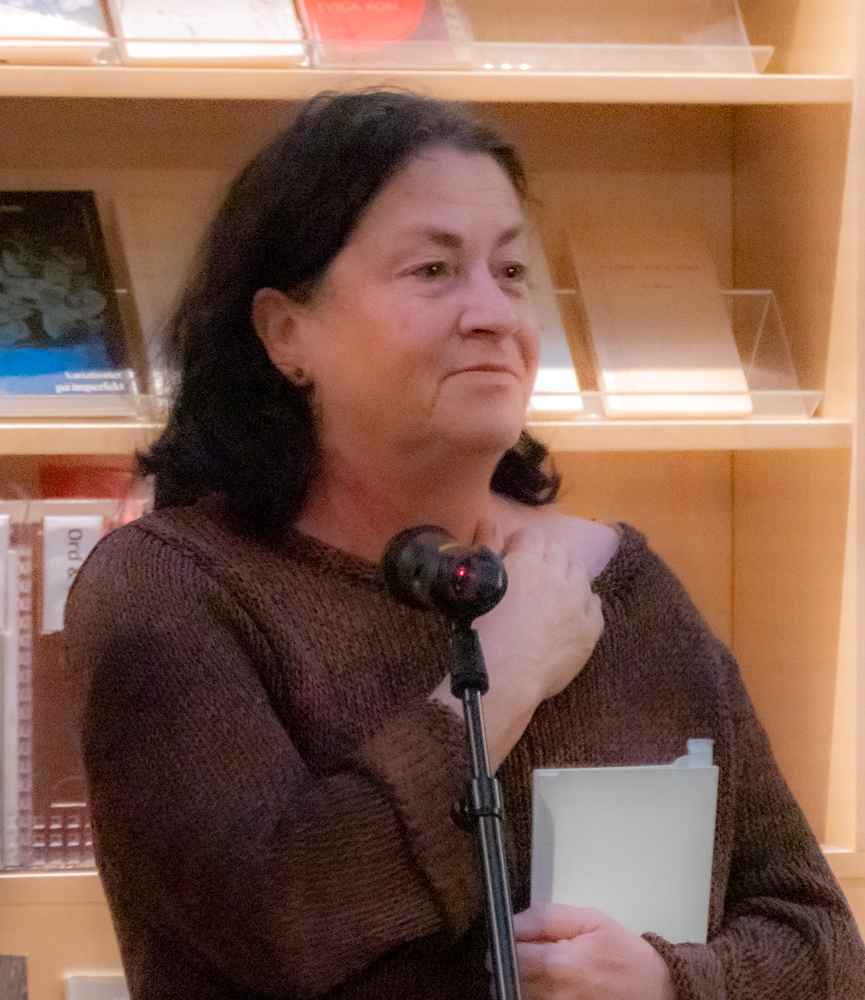
- Born: 1955 (age 70–71)
- Occupations: Poet and playwright
- Awards: Dobloug Prize (2004)

Ann Jäderlund (born 1955) is a Swedish poet and playwright. She made her literary debut in 1985 with the poetry collection Vimpelstaden. Other collections are Snart går jag i sommaren ut from 1990 and I en cylinder i vattnet av vattengråt from 2006. She was awarded the Dobloug Prize in 2004. Esa-Pekka Salonen used her work Two Poems to Songs for a choral work in 2002.

Jäderlund has had a collaboration with the artists Agnes Monus and Mikael Lundberg and the poet Magnus William-Olsson, who resulted in an exhibition at the Moderna Museet in Stockholm in 2009. She has received her poem suite "Purpurbit" compared by Staffan Odenhall. Jäderlund has also translated poems by Emily Dickinson into Swedish.

She is also a playwright. 1995 the play Salome was staged at the Royal Dramatic Theatre, directed by Åsa Kalmér. It is based on the biblical story of Salome dancing for King Herod and his entourage. The king and his men are so enchanted that he promises her a reward, and at the urging of her mother Herodias, she demands the head of John the Baptist on a platter. In Jäderlund's play, however, it is the enchanted men who are killed one by one by Salome.
