= Lars Sund =

Finland Swedish author

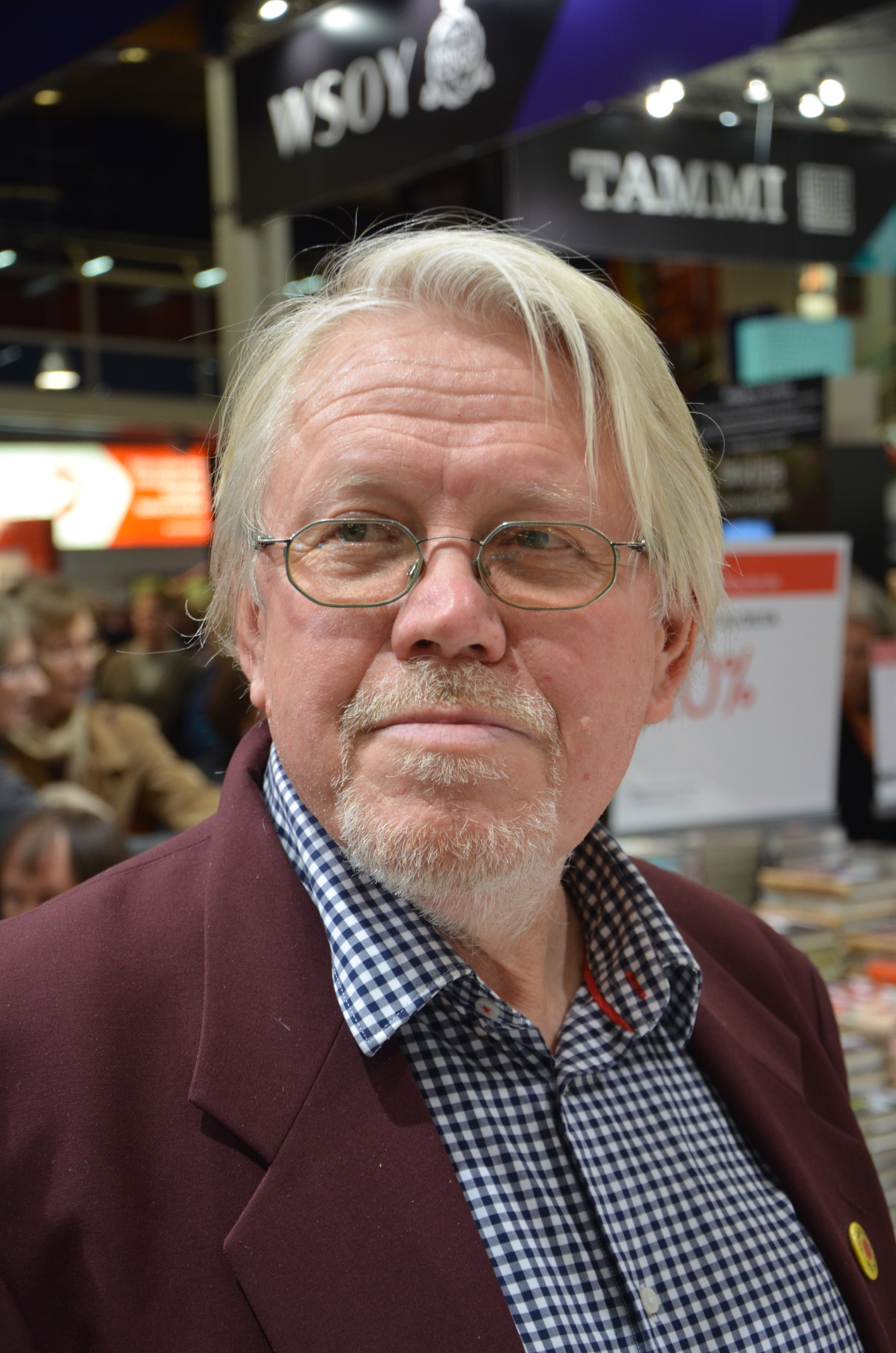
Lars Sund in 2014

Lars Evert Sund (born 2 July 1953 in Jakobstad, Finland), is a Finland-Swedish author. He is the son of car mechanic Evert Sund and postal clerk Ingalill Bergman. He studied English, Swedish and comparative literature at the Åbo Akademi University from 1973 to 1978 and resides in Uppsala, Sweden. He has been married to Gudrun Utas since 1979, the same year he began working as an editor for the newspaper Uppsala Nya Tidning.

Although basically a novelist, in his latest book in 2010 he revealed his favourite hobby, ornithology, and writing essays about his meetings with birds.

Claes Olsson has made a movie called Colorado Avenue, which is based on Sund's books Colorado Avenue and Lanthandlerskans son.

Lars Sund's five latest books have been translated to Finnish.

== Bibliography ==
- Ögonblick (poetry) - 1974
- Natten är ännu ung (novel) - 1975
- Vinterhamn - 1983
- Colorado Avenue - 1991
- Lanthandlerskans son - 1997
- Eriks bok - 2003
- En lycklig liten ö - 2007
- En morgontrött fågelskådares bekännelser, Dagboksblad maj-december - 2010

== Awards ==
- Prize from the Society of Swedish Literature in Finland 1976
- The Runeberg Award 1992
- Thanks for the Book Award 1993 (Colorado Avenue)
- The Lars Widding Award 1998
- Nominated for the Finlandia Prize in 1997 (Lanthandlerskans son)
