= Andrzej Tichý =

Swedish-Czech-Polish writer (born 1978)

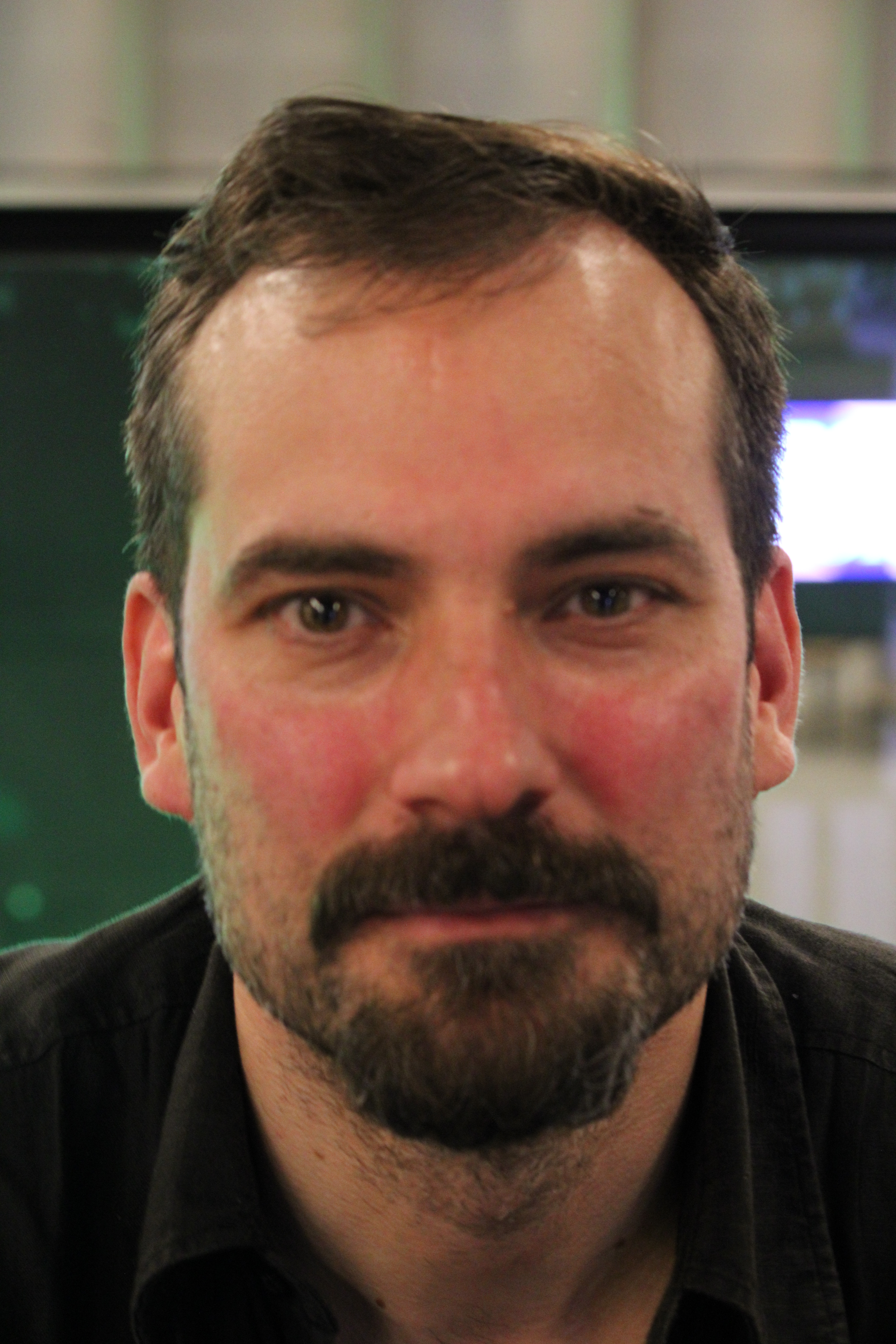
Tichý in 2025

Andrzej Tichý (born 19 December 1978, Prague, Czech Republic) is a Swedish-Czech-Polish writer who has lived in Malmö, Sweden since 1981.

== Biography ==
He has written several novels and is regarded as one of the most important novelists of his generation. He has been nominated for the Nordic Council Literature Prize and the August Prize for Best Fiction Book of the Year. His fifth novel, Wretchedness (2020) published by And Other Stories, is his first to be translated into English and focuses on immigrants and the migrant crisis in Sweden. Speaking on the book with The Guardian, Tichý said: ‘From the outside, Sweden was this paradise. But it was never actually true’.

== Books ==
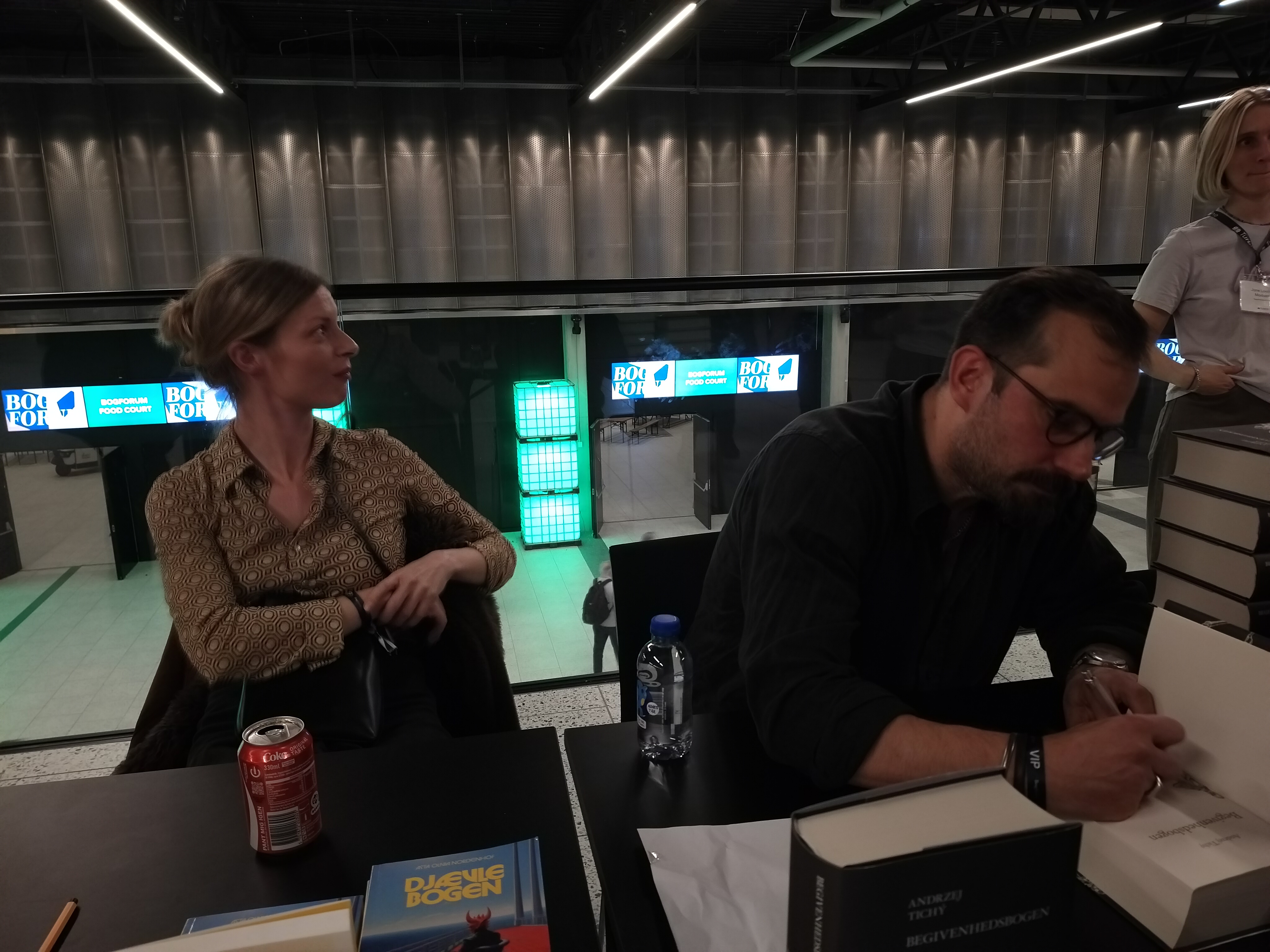
Tichý signing books with Asta Olivia Nordenhof at Bogforum 2025

- Sex liter luft (2005)
- Fält (2008)
- Karios (2013)
- Omsorgen (2015)
- Wretchedness (Eländet, 2016) translated by Nichola Smalley, 2020
