= Indriði G. Þorsteinsson =

Icelandic writer (1926–2000)

Indriði Guðmundur Þorsteinsson (18 April 1926 – 3 September 2000) was an Icelandic writer.

== Life ==
Indriði was born on a farm in Skagafjörður, the son of a labourer. He studied at Héraðsskólinn á Laugarvatni from 1942 to 1943. He worked as a driver in Akureyri from 1945 to 1951, when he became a reporter at Tíminn. From 1959 to 1962 he was a reporter for Alþýðublaðið and from 1962 to 1973 he was the editor of the newspaper Tíminn. In 1973 he was appointed director of the national festival, which was held at Þingvellir in 1974. In the years following, he worked at his writing until again becoming the editor of Tíminn (1987–1991). He was also campaign director for Albert Gudmundsson's presidential run where he ceded to Vigdis Finnbogadottir. Indriði was the father of the writer Arnaldur Indriðason.

== Early works ==
Indriði first received attention by winning a short story contest in 1951 with Blástör, a humorous and erotic fertility story. That same year he published his first short story collection, Sæluvika. In 1955 he published his first novel, 79 af stöðinni ("Taxi 79"). The book was very successful. It deals with the difficulties of a country boy who moves to the city and, more generally, the ongoing changes in Icelandic society brought by modernization and urbanization. The story was made into a film in 1962, a milestone in the history of Icelandic cinema.

== Later works ==
- Þeir sem guðirnir elska (1957), short story collection
- Land og synir (1963, "Land and Sons"), novel
- Þjófur í paradís (1967, "Thief in Paradise"), novel
- Norðan við stríð (1971, "North of War"), novel

His novels Land og synir and Norðan við stríð were shortlisted for the Nordic Council's Literature Prize in 1965 and 1973 respectively.
