= Laura Lindstedt =

Finnish novelist

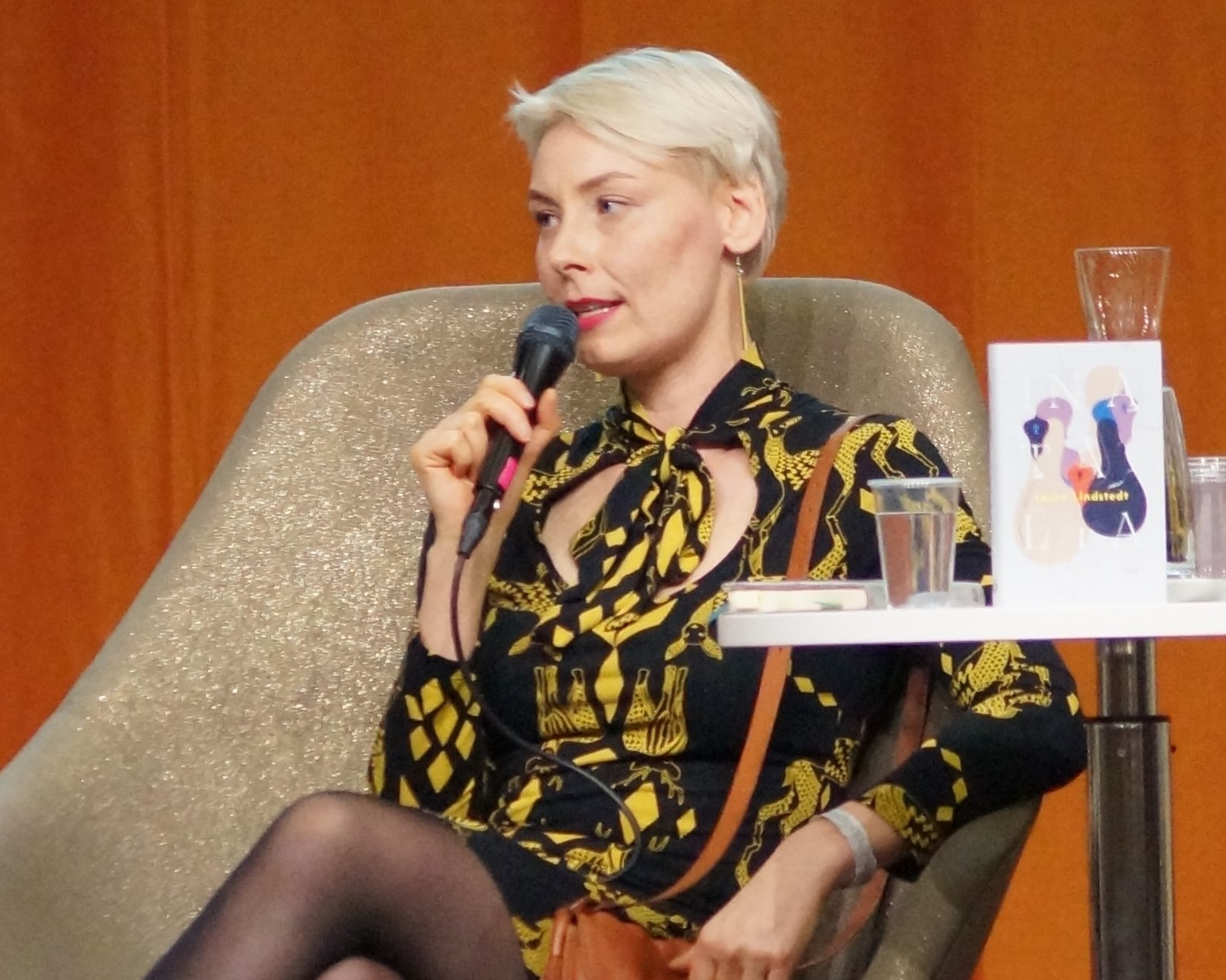
2019.

Laura Valpuri Lindstedt (born 1 May 1976 in Kajaani) is a Finnish novelist. Her debut novel, Scissors, which was published in 2007, was nominated for the Finlandia Prize, the top literary prize in Finland. Lindstedt's second novel, Oneiron, which took 8 years to write, earned her the Finlandia Prize in 2015. Lindstedt is one of Finland's leading internationally known writers.
