= Tom Malmquist =

Swedish writer

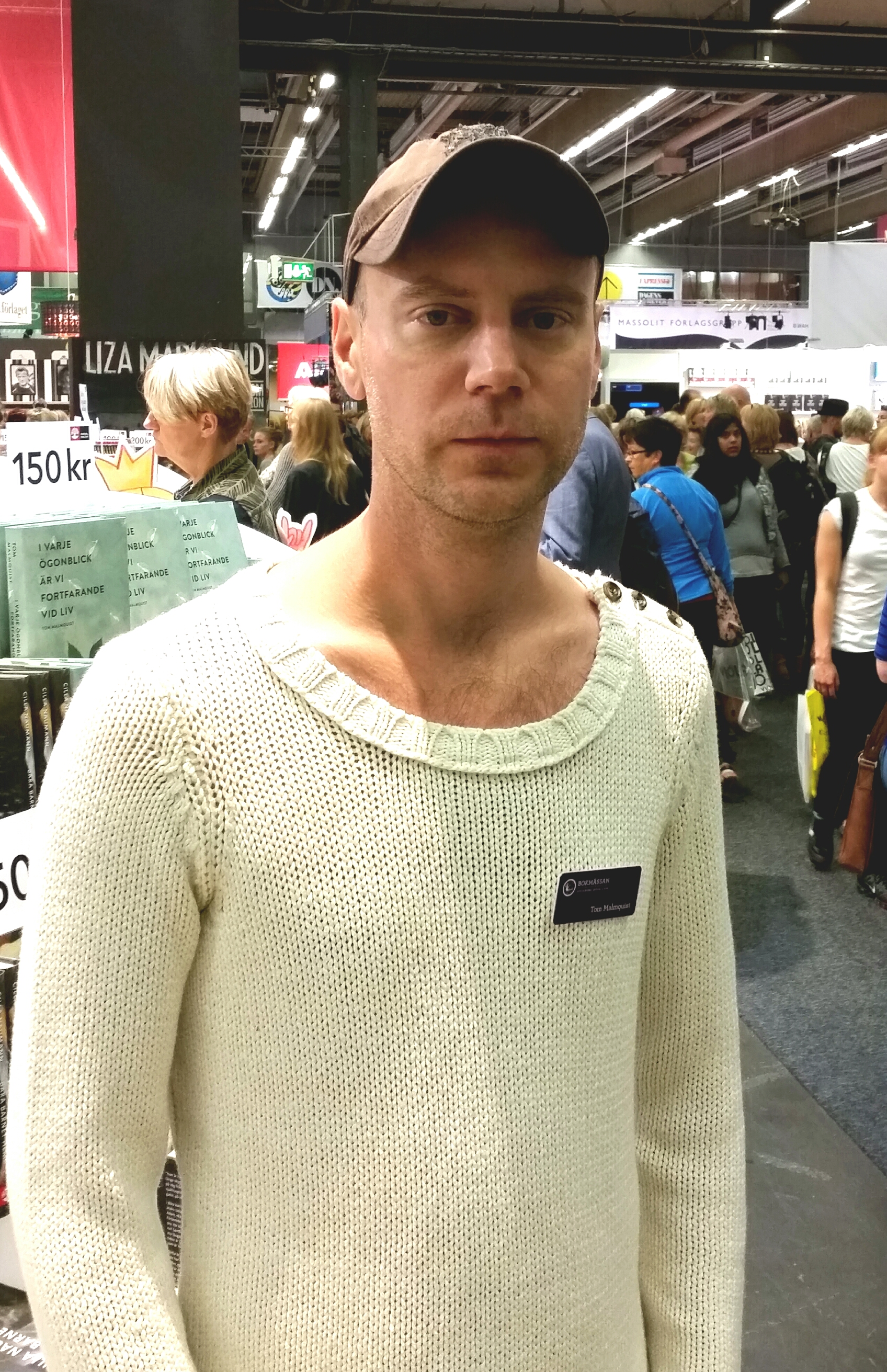
- Born: March 23, 1978; Huddinge, Sweden
- Occupations: Writer; Poet
- Writing career
- Language: Swedish
- Genres: Literary; Non-fiction; Poetry
- Notable works: I varje ögonblick är vi fortfarande vid liv; Fadersmjölken; Sudden Death

Tom Malmquist (born March 23, 1978, in Sweden), is a poet and an author. His most notable work is his auto-biographical and award-winning novel In Every Moment We Are Still Alive [I varje ögonblick är vi fortfarande vid liv, 2015].

In the novel, the main character's partner Karin is diagnosed with acute myeloid leukemia 33 weeks into her pregnancy. Tom and Karin's daughter Livia is born via cesarean section, but just a week after her birth Karin passes. A few months later, Tom's father also loses the battle against cancer. In Every Moment We Are Still Alive has been called “furiously beautiful” by the Swedish press and received several of the country's most prestigious literary awards, amongst else the Karin Boye Literary Prize (2015) and Dagens Nyheter Culture Prize (2016). Malmquist was additionally shortlisted for the Nordic Council's Literature Prize (2016).

In Every Moment We Are Still Alive is sold to twenty countries: Germany, France, China, and others. In February 2018, The New York Times listed it as “12 New Books We Recommend This Week.” The New York Times additionally listed the novel as a “100 Notable Books of 2018” title. The Spanish newspaper El País chose it as one of this decade's nine best books about life and death. The Guardian called it “a deeply personal account of loss.”

Malmquist is also a highly acclaimed poet in Sweden. To date he has published two collections of poetry in his homeland, both praised by the Swedish critics.

== Awards ==
2018: The Stina and Erik Lundberg Foundation Grant

2016: Dagens Nyheter Culture Prize – I varje ögonblick är vi fortfarande vid liv

2016: Shortlisted for the Nordic Council's Literature Prize The Nordic Countries – I varje ögonblick är vi fortfarande vid liv

2015: The Karin Boye Literary Prize Sweden – I varje ögonblick är vi fortfarande vid liv

2015: The Albert Bonnier Scholarship Fund for Swedish writers Sweden – I varje ögonblick är vi fortfarande vid liv

== Bibliography ==
2018: In Every Moment We Are Still Alive (Melville House)

2017: In Every Moment We Are Still Alive (Sceptre / Hodder & Stoughton)

2015: I varje ögonblick är vi fortfarande vid liv (Memoir) (Natur & Kultur)
