= Mariane Petersen =

Mariane Petersen (born 1937) is a Greenlandic poet, translator, museum curator, and politician.

== Biography ==
Petersen was born in Maniitsoq, a town in western Greenland that was then known as Sukkertoppen. She is trained as a translator and has translated various books from Danish into Greenlandic. Significant works of translation include Vinterbørn by Dea Trier Mørch and Århundradets kärlekssaga by Märta Tikkanen.

She also worked for many years as a curator at the Greenland National Museum, serving as director from 1982 until her retirement in 2004.

In 1988 she published her first volume of poetry, Niviugaq aalakoortoq allallu. It was the first poetry collection published by a woman in Greenlandic. For this work, she was nominated for the Nordic Council Literature Prize in 1993. That year she published Inuiaat nunaallu, an epic poem bout the history of Greenland, followed by the collection Asuliivik asuli in 1997. In 2012, she was honored with the Frederik Nielsen Memorial Fund's 10,000-kroner prize.

Her latest work, Piniartorsuit kinguaavi, was also nominated for the Nordic Council prize in 2013, though she lost to the Danish-Norwegian author Kim Leine.

Petersen's poetry is generally humorous in tone and often deals with everyday life in Greenland. She writes in both Greenlandic and Danish, translating her own work.

She is also a politician, having previously sat on the Nuuk Municipal Council.

== Selected works ==
=== Poetry ===
- 1988: Niviugaq aalakoortoq allallu
- 1993: Inuiaat nunaallu
- 1997: Asuliivik asuli
- 2010: Piniartorsuit kinguaavi taallat/Storfangernes efterkommere

=== Translations ===
- 1977: Svend Otto S.: Tim og Trine, translated as Tim aamma Trine
- 1978: Dea Trier Mørch: Vinterbørn, translated as Íssip nalâne inúngortut
- 1980: Mogens Hoff: Børnene ved Krokodillesøen, translated as Meeqqat kuukkooriarsuit tasiata sinaamiut
- 1981: Barbro Sedwall: Fiskarbarn, translated as Aalisartukkut paniat
- 1981: Ole Hertz: Tobias pa sælfangst, translated as Tuppiarsi puisinniartoq
- 1981: Ole Hertz: Tobias fisker fra isen, translated as Tuppiarsi sikumi aalisartoq
- 1986: Aage Gilberg: Verdens nordligste læge, translated as Avanersuarmi nakorsaq
- 1988: Glen Rounds: The Blind Colt, translated as Hesti piaraq tappiitsoq
- 1989: Märta Tikkanen: Århundradets kärlekssaga, translated as Asanninneq naliitsoq
- 1989: Mette Newth: Bortførelsen, translated as Aallarussineq
- 1992: Ole Lund Kirkegaard: Mig og Bedstefar – og så Nisse Pok, translated as Uangalu aatagalu aammalu Nissi Pooq
- 1993: Kenneth Thomasma: Naya Nuki, translated as Naya Nuki – niviarsiaraq qimaasoq
- 1994: Torbjørn Borgen: Svampe i Grønland, translated as Pupiit Kalaallit Nunaanni
- 1996: Jørgen F. Nissen: Erfaring, styrke – og håb, translated as Misilittagaqarneq, sapiissuseqalerneq, aamma neriunneq
- 1996: Maaliaaraq Vebæk: Navaranaaq og andre, translated as Navaranaaq allallu
- 1997: Jørgen F. Nissen: Uliv, translated as Inuunipalaaq
- 2003: Ole Hertz: Tobias fisker ørred, translated as Tuppiarsi eqalunniartoq
- 2006: Hans-Christian Gulløv: Grønlands forhistorie, translated as Kalaallit Nunaata itsarsuaq oqaluttuassartaa
- 2016: Gunvor Bjerre: Månemanden og andre fortællinger fra Grønland, translated as Qaammatip inua oqaluttuallu allat Kalaallit Nunaanneersut
