= Carl Frode Tiller =

Norwegian author, historian and musician (born 1970)

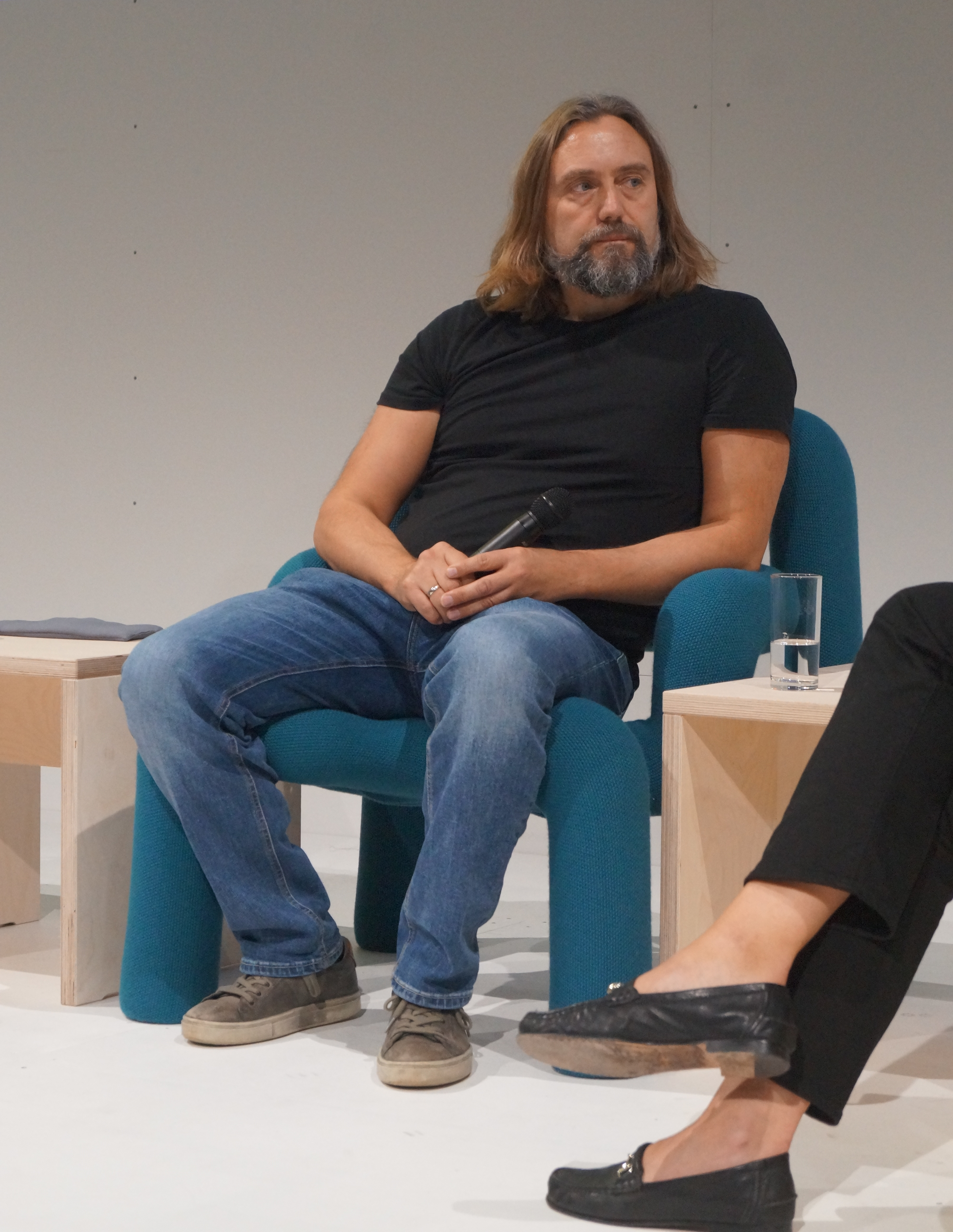
- Carl Frode at Frankfurt Book Fair, 2019
- Born: 4 January 1970 (age 56); Namsos, Norway
- Occupations: Author, novelist
- Writing career
- Period: 2001–present
- Genre: Fiction

Carl Frode Tiller (born 4 January 1970 in Namsos) is a Norwegian author, historian and musician. His works are in Nynorsk (lit. 'New Norwegian'), one of the two official Norwegian standard languages.

Tiller made his literary debut in 2001 with the novel Skråninga (The Slope), which was recognized as the best Norwegian literary debut of the year with the Tarjei Vesaas' debutantpris and nominated for the Brage Prize. In November 2007 Tiller was awarded the Brage Prize for his novel no:Innsirkling (Encirclement). In the fall of 2007 no:Innsirkling received the Norwegian Critics Prize for Literature and was nominated for the premiere Scandinavian literature prize, the Nordic Council's Literature Prize. It also won him the European Union Literary Award in 2009.

Tiller is also a musician in the band Kong Ler.

His daughter is a member of UHSN. Her name is Oline.

== Bibliography ==
- 2001: Skråninga (The Slope) – novel
- 2003: Bipersonar (Minor Characters) – novel
- 2007: no:Innsirkling (Encirclement) – novel
- 2007: Folkehelsa (Public Health) – play (2007)
- 2010: Innsirkling II (Encirclement II) – novel
- 2014: Innsirkling III (Encirclement III) – novel

== Awards ==
- Tarjei Vesaas' debutantpris 2001, for Skråninga
- Aschehoug's Debutant Endowment 2001, for Skråninga
- NRK P2 Listener's Prize 2001, for Skråninga
- Sunnmøre Prize 2001, for Skråninga
- no:Bjørnsonstipendet 2004, for Bipersonar
- Brage Prize 2007, for Innsirkling
- Mads Wiel Nygaards Endowment 2007
- Norwegian Critics Prize for Literature 2007, for Innsirkling
- Sultprisen 2008
