= From Hell to Paradise (book) =

1964 non-fiction book by Olof Lagercrantz

- Author: Olof Lagercrantz
- Working title: Från helvetet till paradiset
- Language: Swedish
- Genre: non-fiction
- Published: 1965
- Publication place: Sweden
- Awards: Nordic Council's Literature Prize of 1965

From Hell to Paradise (Swedish: Från helvetet till paradiset) is a 1964 book by Swedish author Olof Lagercrantz about the work of Dante Alighieri.. It won the Nordic Council's Literature Prize in 1965.
