= Peter Seeberg =

Danish novelist and playwright

- Born: 22 June 1925
- Died: 8 January 1999 (aged 73)
- Education: University of Copenhagen
- Occupations: Novelist and playwright
- Awards: Nordic Council's Literature Prize (1983)

Peter Seeberg (22 June 1925 – 8 January 1999) was a Danish modernist novelist and playwright, inspired by the French existentialists. He made his literary debut in 1956 with the novel Bipersonerne. He was born in Skrydstrup in Haderslev Municipality

Peter Seeberg graduated from Haderslev Cathedral school in 1943 and pursued an education as an archaeologist. Together with his authorship he was a museum custodian in Viborg. Seeberg graduated with a Magister Artium (The Artists Teacher) in 1951 from University of Copenhagen, with a concentration on Friedrich Nietzsche. Seeberg's own life mirrored Nietzsche's life; they both had distant mothers and both their fathers died early. Seeberg's own father was also an author and was a missionary priest. Seeberg's entire family was Christian and according to Seeberg's own journal, was centered on a jealous and vengeful God.

He was awarded the Nordic Council's Literature Prize in 1983 for the short story collection Om fjorten dage ("In Fourteen Days").

== Awards ==
- Nordic Council's Literature Prize 1983
