= Axess magasin =

Swedish-language magazine published in Sweden

- Axess magasin's front cover issue 2008:6.
- Chief editor: Nina Solomin
- Categories: Newsmagazine
- Frequency: 9 issues/year
- Founded: 2002; 24 years ago
- Company: Axess Publishing AB
- Country: Sweden
- Based in: Stockholm
- Language: Swedish
- Website: axess.se
- ISSN: 1651-0941

Axess magasin is a Swedish-language magazine published in Sweden. The magazine is published by Axess Publishing AB which is owned by Nordstjernan Kultur och Media, a company in the Ax:son Johnson Group. The magazine was established in 2002 and is based in Stockholm. Until issue 2007:6 the magazine was only called Axess. At the same time the magazine changed profile towards more culture issues.

The magazine is chiefly devoted to the liberal arts and social sciences. Axess aims to unite academic culture and publishing culture to create a forum in which researchers in the humanities and liberal arts can meet a wider public.

Axess is published nine times a year. Each issue has a theme where different academic disciplines are allowed to spotlight central issues from various perspectives. Diverse viewpoints are illuminated and juxtaposed.

Axess magasin also includes an extensive review section to cover the most important new books being published worldwide.

== See also ==
- Axess TV
