= Queen's Gate (poetry collection) =

Book by Pia Tafdrup

- Author: Pia Tafdrup
- Original title: Dronningeporten
- Language: Danish
- Genre: poetry
- Published: 1999
- Publication place: Denmark
- Awards: Nordic Council's Literature Prize of 1999

Queen's Gate (Danish: Dronningeporten) is a 1999 poetry collection by Danish poet Pia Tafdrup. It won the Nordic Council's Literature Prize in 1999.
