= Om fjorten dage =

1981 short story collection by Peter Seeberg

- First edition
- Author: Peter Seeberg
- Language: Danish
- Genre: short stories
- Published: 1981
- Publisher: Arena
- Publication place: Denmark
- Awards: Nordic Council's Literature Prize of 1983

Om fjorten dage (lit. In Fourteen Days) is a 1981 short story collection by Danish author Peter Seeberg. It won the Nordic Council's Literature Prize in 1983.
