= Ása Sólveig =

Icelandic writer

Ása Sólveig Guðmundsdóttir (January 12, 1945 – December 10, 2015) was an Icelandic writer. Her debut novel, Einkamál Stefaníu (1978), was a nominee for the Nordic Council Literature Prize.

Sólveig's work centers on the issues faced by women and other marginalized people in Iceland, and "enact[s] a muted but painful confrontation with the myth of the strong, close-knit Icelandic family."

== Biography ==
Sólveig was born in 1945 in Reykjavík, Iceland. She was raised there by her mother, foster mother, and grandmother.

She married her first husband, Jón Eldon, at age 17 and had three children over six years. The two divorced, and she later married Hörður Gunnarsson, a partnership that lasted until his death in 1999.

Sólveig initially became known as a scriptwriter and writer of radio plays. Her first notable work as a writer was the 1972 TV drama Svartur sólargeisli, which was about racism in Iceland. This was followed by several radio plays and television scripts, including Elsa in 1974.

Her debut novel Einkamál Stefaníu ("Stefania's Private Affairs"), a description of life as a suburban housewife, was a success upon its publication in 1978. The novel dealt with such issues as pregnancy, sexuality, and marital abuse. It was lauded by the newspaper Dagblaðið, which awarded it a cultural prize. Einkamál Stefaníu also garnered her a nomination for the Nordic Council Literature Prize in 1980.

She followed it up with Treg í taumi, the story of a woman struggling with alcoholism, in 1979. In 1983, she published her last novel, Nauðug/viljug.

Sólveig's work, written in a neorealist style, contributed to the national debate at the time about the status of women in Iceland.

After her final novel in 1983, she published little, with the exception of the 1995 radio play Systir sæl og bless. She primarily supported herself by working as a proofreader for the newspaper Morgunblaðið. Sólveig died in 2015, at age 70.
