= Þorsteinn frá Hamri =

Þorsteinn frá Hamri (aka Þorsteinn Jónsson), (15 March 1938 – 28 January 2018) was an Icelandic writer notable for having been nominated five times for the Nordic Council's Literature Prize over a period of 35 years.

Hamri died on 28 January 2018, at the age of 79.

== Writings ==
Since his first book of poems released in the 1950s, Þorsteinn frá Hamri had published seventeen volumes of poetry and six of prose fiction by 2000.

== Bibliography ==
=== Novels, short stories and sagnaþættir (chronicles) ===
- 1963 – Skuldaskil (The Reckoning)
- 1969 – Himinbjargarsaga eða Skógardraumur (The Story of Himinbjörg or a Forest Dream) – nominated for 1972 Nordic Council Literature Prize
- Haust í Skírisskógi (Autumn in Sherwood Forest)
- Hallgrímur smali og húsfreyjan á bjargi, (Hallgrímur the sheaphearder and the housekeeper at Bjarg)
- 1987 – Ætternisstapi og átján vermenn (The ancestral home and eighteen sailors)
- 1989 – Vatns götur og blóðs (Streets of Water and Blood) – nominated for 1992 Nordic Council Literature Prize

=== Poetry ===
- 1958 – Í svörtum kufli (In a black cassock)
- 1960 – Tannfé handa nýjum heimi (Tooth fee for a New World)
- 1962 – Lifandi manna land (Land of living men)
- 1964 – Langnætti á Kaldadal (A long night in Kaldidalur (cold valley))
- 1972 – Veðrahjálmur (Weather helmet)
- 1977 – Fiðrið úr sæng daladrottningar (The feathers from the valley queen's duvet) – nominated for 1979 Nordic Council Literature Prize
- 1982 – Spjótalög á spegil (Spearthrusted mirror) – nominated for 1984 Nordic Council Literature Prize
- 1992 – Sæfarinn sofandi (The sleeping sailor)
- Það talar í trjánum (Speaking in the trees)
- Vetrarmyndin (Winter image)
- 1999 – Medan pu vaktir

== Prizes and awards ==
- 1972 – short list – Nordic Council Literature Prize for the novel Himinbjargarsaga eða Skógardraumur.
- 1979 – short list – Nordic Council Literature Prize for the poetry collection Fiðrið úr sæng Daladrottningar.
- 1981 – Children's book literary award for translation, Reykjavík
- 1984 – short list – Nordic Council Literature Prize for the poetry collection Spjótalög á spegil.
- 1991 – Thorbergur Thordarson Literary Prize
- 1992 – short list – Nordic Council Literature Prize for the poetry collection Vatns götur og blóðs.
- 1992 – Icelandic Literary Prize
- 2015 – short list – Nordic Council Literature Prize for the poetry collection Skessukatlar.

== See also ==
- Icelandic literature
