= Svava Jakobsdóttir =

Icelandic author and feminist politician (1930–2004)

- Born: 4 October 1930; Neskaupstaður, Iceland
- Died: 21 February 2004 (aged 73); Reykjavík, Iceland
- Occupation(s): Author and feminist politician

Svava Jakobsdóttir (4 October 1930 – 21 February 2004) was one of Iceland's prominent 20th century authors and feminist politicians. Her writing was characterized by "a unique brand of surreal feminism." Her father (Hans) Jakob Jónsson was a Lutheran minister. From 1935 to 1940 he and his family lived in Wynyard, Saskatchewan where he served as the pastor of the Icelandic-Canadian congregation. She graduated from Smith College in 1952. After that she studied at Somerville College, Oxford. She was a member of the Althing, the Icelandic parliament, from 1971 to 1979 for the left-wing party Alþýðubandalagið (People's Alliance). Her best-known works are the novel Gunnlaðar saga (The Saga of Gunnlod), the novella Leigjandinn (The Lodger) and the macabre short story "Saga handa börnum" ("A Story for Children"). Besides prose she also wrote poetry and plays. She won the Henrik Steffens Award in 1997.
