= The Sun, My Father =

1991 poetry book by Nils-Aslak Valkeapää

- First edition
- Author: Nils-Aslak Valkeapää
- Original title: Beaivi, áhčážan
- Language: Northern Sami
- Genre: poetry
- Published: 1991
- Publisher: DAT
- Publication place: Finland
- Awards: Nordic Council's Literature Prize of 1980

The Sun, My Father (Northern Sami: Beaivi, áhčážan) is a 1991 poetry collection by Finnish Sami author Nils-Aslak Valkeapää. It won the Nordic Council's Literature Prize in 1991.
