= Tomas Mikael Bäck =

Swedo-Finnish poet and librarian

- Born: 18 February 1946 (age 80); Vaasa, Finland
- Occupations: Poet, librarian
- Awards: Längmanska Kulturfonden's Finland prize (1977); Prize from Society of Swedish Literature in Finland (1978); Edith Södergran prize (2014)

Tomas Mikael Bäck (born 18 February 1946) is a Finland-Swedish poet and librarian. Bäck lives in Helsinki.

Born in Vaasa, he is the son of technical director Ragnar Gottfrid Bäck and librarian Else Ellinor Finnilä. Bäck graduated with a degree in library science from University of Helsinki 1971 and received a Bachelor of Arts degree from the University of Helsinki in 1972. He has worked as a librarian at Hanken School of Economics's library from 1971 to 1972, at Espoo City Library from 1973 to 1974 and at Vantaa City Library, where he was employed from 1974 to 1979 and then head of department from 1979 to 1983. Bäck was also a board member of Boklaget för Södra Finland from 1976 to 1977, vice-chairman from 1977 to 1979 and chairman from 1980 to 1982.

== Bibliography ==
- 1972 – Andhämtning, poetry collection, Söderströms
- 1975 – Och hastigt förstå, poetry collection, Söderströms
- 1977 – Början av ett år, poetry collection, Boklaget
- 1980 – Tills vi äger våra liv, poetry collection, Boklaget
- 1982 – Denna dag, poetry collection, Boklaget
- 1984 – Regnljus och snö, poetry collection, Alba
- 1985 – Språngmarsch på stället, poetry collection, Alba
- 1986 – Flytande avsatser, poetry collection, Alba
- 1988 – Frågare!, poetry collection, Alba
- 1990 – Spånkorg, poetry collection, Alba
- 1992 – Tilltal, dictationology , Almqvist & Wiksell
- 1995 – Trädgårdssten, poetry collection, Schildts
- 1997 – Memoarer och annan dikt, poetry collection, Schildts
- 2000 – Sol-sordin, poetry collection, Schildts
- 2003 – Väggvitt, poetry collection, Schildts
- 2005 – Den sextonde månaden, poetry collection, Schildts
- 2008 – Infjärdsbild, poetry collection, Schildts
- 2010 – Med ålderns rätt, antologi, Schildts
- 2010 – Fantasi C-dur, poetry collection, Schildts
- 2012 – Brottyta, poetry collection, Schildts & Söderströms
- 2014 – Vinterresa. Sjuttiotre dikter, poetry collection, Schildts & Söderströms
- 2016 – De tysta gatorna, poetry collection, Schildts & Söderströms
- 2018 – Morgon, poetry collection, Schildts & Söderströms

== Awards ==
- 1977 – Längmanska Kulturfonden's Finland prize
- 1978 – Prize from Society of Swedish Literature in Finland
- 2014 – Edith Södergran prize
- 2016 – Nominated for the Nordic Council Literature Prize for De tysta gatorna
