= Ristin Sokki =

Sámi writer and educator in Norway

Ristin Sokki (born 1954), sometimes written Risten Sokki, is a Sámi writer and educator in Norway. Her works of poetry and short fiction, written in the Northern Sámi language, draw from her family history and her experiences in Norway's far north. In 1998, her poetry collection Bonán bonán soga suonaid was the Sámi nominee for the Nordic Council Literature Prize.

== Biography ==
Sokki was born in 1954 in Kautokeino, a Northern Sámi village in Norway. She is descended from Aslak Hætta, a Sámi revolutionary leader who was executed in the 1850s, and she has grappled with this legacy in her work.

Sokki's work often deals with love, grief, abuse, and the traumas of childhood. She writes in Sámi, specifically Northern Sámi. Her debut book, the bilingual Sámi-Norwegian poetry collection Bonán bonán soga suonaid, was published in 1996. It was nominated for the Nordic Council Literature Prize in 1998, representing the Sámi cultural region

Her other books include the children's book Mu ártegis eallin (2007), which won a Nordic children's literature competition given by the Nordic Council of Ministers and was translated into Southern Sámi, Lule Sámi, Norwegian, Greenlandic, and Faroese. She also published a short story collection, titled Geadgeloddi, in 2018.

In addition, Sokki has written a book on Sámi cooking and contributed to several grade school textbooks for Sámi speakers. She works in her hometown of Kautokeino as a schoolteacher at the Sámi Upper Secondary and Reindeer Husbandry School, Norway's only Sámi-language vocational school.
