= Fríða Á. Sigurðardóttir =

Icelandic writer (1940–2010)

- Born: December 11, 1940; Hornstrandir
- Died: May 7, 2010 (aged 69); Reykjavík
- Occupations: Novelist and short story writer
- Awards: Icelandic Literary Prize (1990); Nordic Council's Literature Prize (1992)

Fríða Áslaug Sigurðardóttir (born December 11, 1940, in Hornstrandir- died May 7, 2010, in Reykjavík) was an Icelandic novelist and short story writer. She made her literary debut in 1980 with the collection of short stories titled Þetta er ekkert alvarlegt ("Nothing Serious"). She was awarded the Nordic Council's Literature Prize in 1992 for the novel Meðan nóttin líður ("Through the Night").

== Awards ==
- Icelandic Literary Prize (Íslensku bókmenntaverðlaunin) 1990
- Nordic Council's Literature Prize 1992
