= Poika =

Poika means boy or son in Finnish and may refer to

- Jukka Poika (born 1980), Finnish reggae artist
- Pohjosen poika, a studio album by Finnish rapper Mikael Gabriel
- Kersantin poika, a 1973 novel by Veijo Meri
- Aatamin poika, a 1996 Finnish TV film drama
- Speedy Gonzales – noin 7 veljeksen poika, a 1970 Finnish western comedy
- Bigi Poika, a resort in Suriname
- Oranju Poika, a lake in India
- Kanada-malja, Finnish ice hockey championship trophy
