= Nordic Council Literature Prize =

Literary award of the Nordic Council

- Awarded for: "a work of imaginative literature written in one of the Nordic languages"
- Date: Annual, winner announced in the spring
- Country: Nordic countries
- Presented by: Nordic Council
- Reward: DKK 350,000
- First award: 1962

The Nordic Council Literature Prize is awarded for a work of literature written in one of the languages of the Nordic countries, that meets "high literary and artistic standards". Established in 1962, the prize is awarded every year, and is worth 350,000 Danish kroner (2008). Eligible works are typically novels, plays, collections of poetry, short stories or essays, or other works that were published for the first time during the last four years, or in the case of works written in Danish, Norwegian, or Swedish, within the last two years. The prize is one of the most prestigious awards that Nordic authors can win.

The winner is chosen by an adjudication committee appointed by the Nordic Council. The committee consists of ten members, two each from Denmark, Finland, Iceland, Norway and Sweden. The committee members are generally experts in their own country's literature, as well as their neighbouring countries. In addition to the regular members, additional members may be added to the committee if works are nominated from Åland, the Faroe Islands, Greenland or the Sami language area. Apart from the monetary award, the intent of the prize is also to "increase interest in the literature of neighbouring countries as well in Nordic cultural fellowship".

== Committee members as of 2025 ==
As of 2025 the jury consists of the following proper elected members

- Stig Hansén (Sweden)
- Pia Ingström (Finland)
- Jón Yngvi Jóhannsson (Iceland)
- Outi Menna (Finland)
- Kathrine Nedrejord (Norway)
- Karin Nykvist (Sweden)
- Gro Frank Rasmussen (Denmark)
- Erik Skyum-Nielsen (Denmark)
- Soffía Auður Birgisdóttir (Iceland)
- Bjørn Sortland (Norway)

Additionally the jury includes deputy members, appointed members and ex officio members.

== List of winners ==
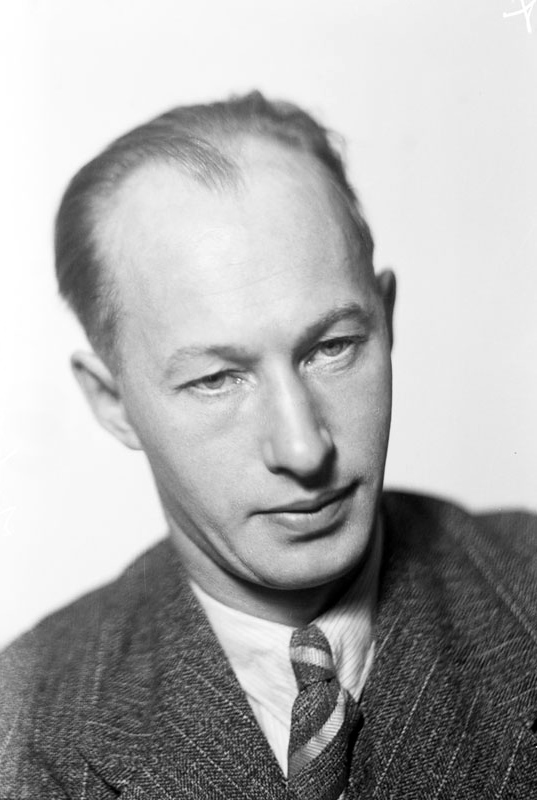
Eyvind Johnson, 1962

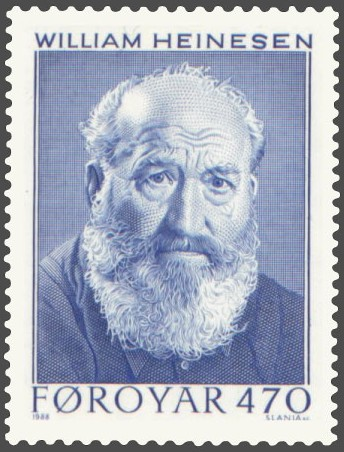
William Heinesen, 1965

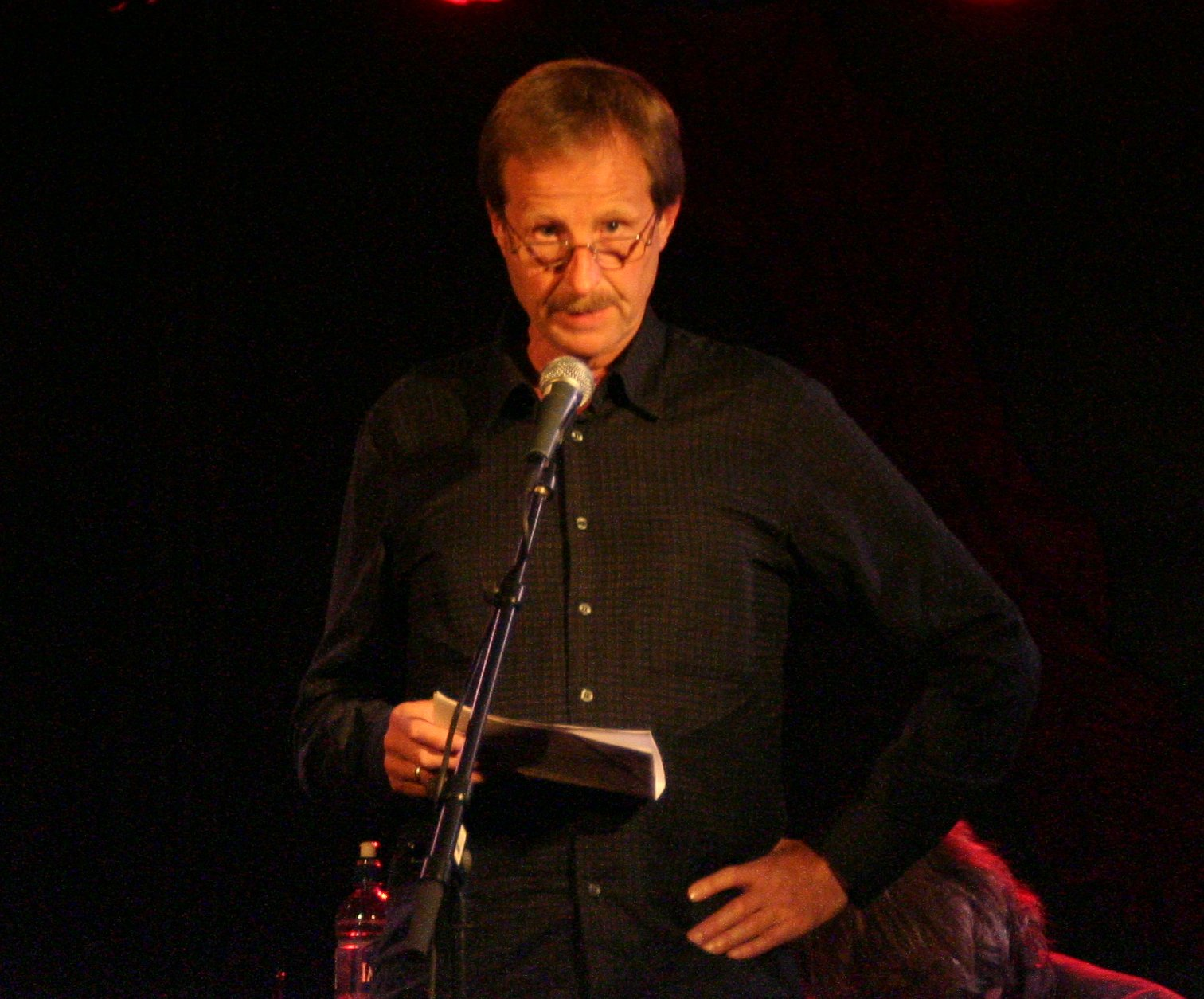
Kjartan Fløgstad, 1978

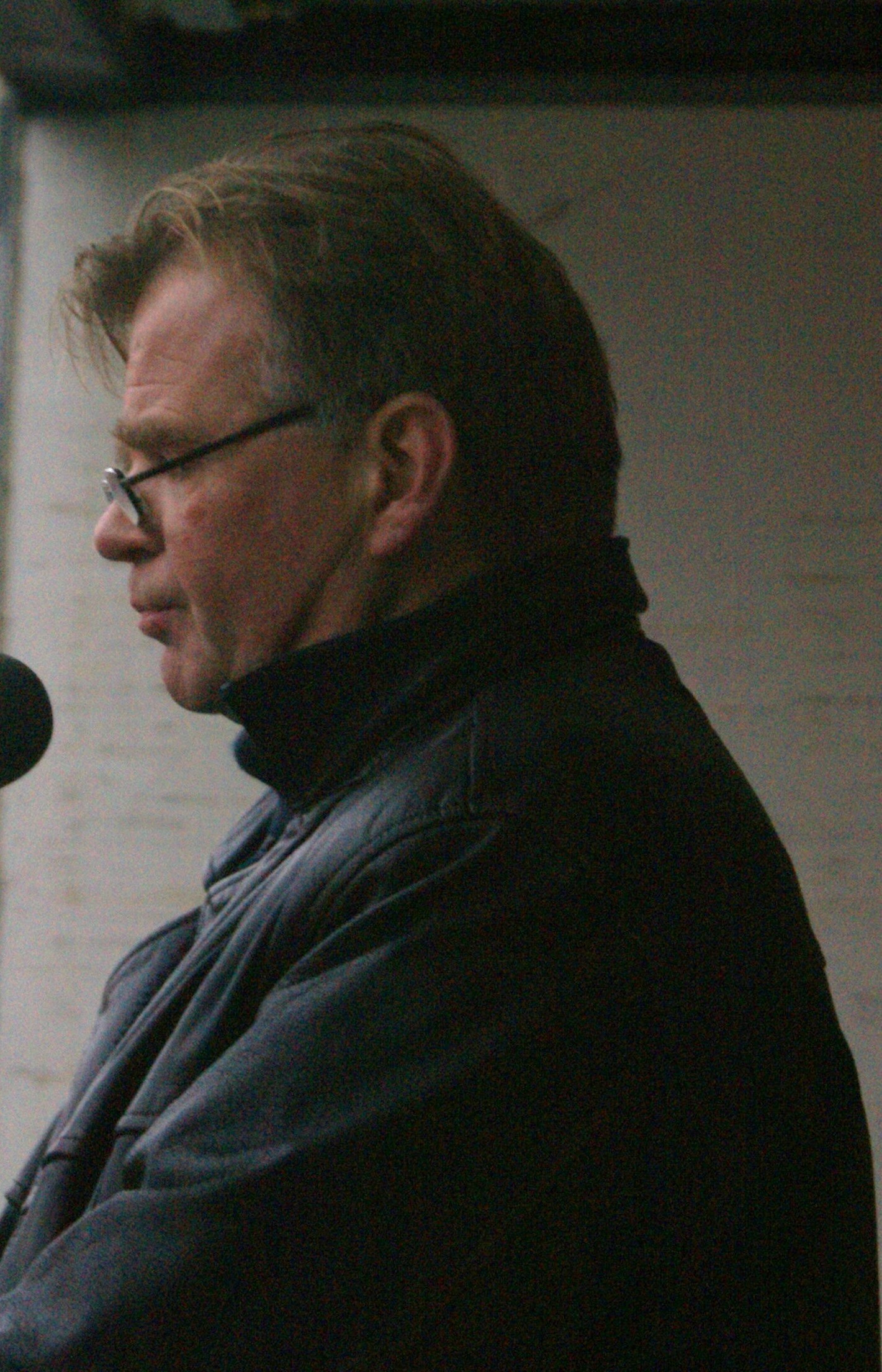
Einar Már Guðmundsson, 1995

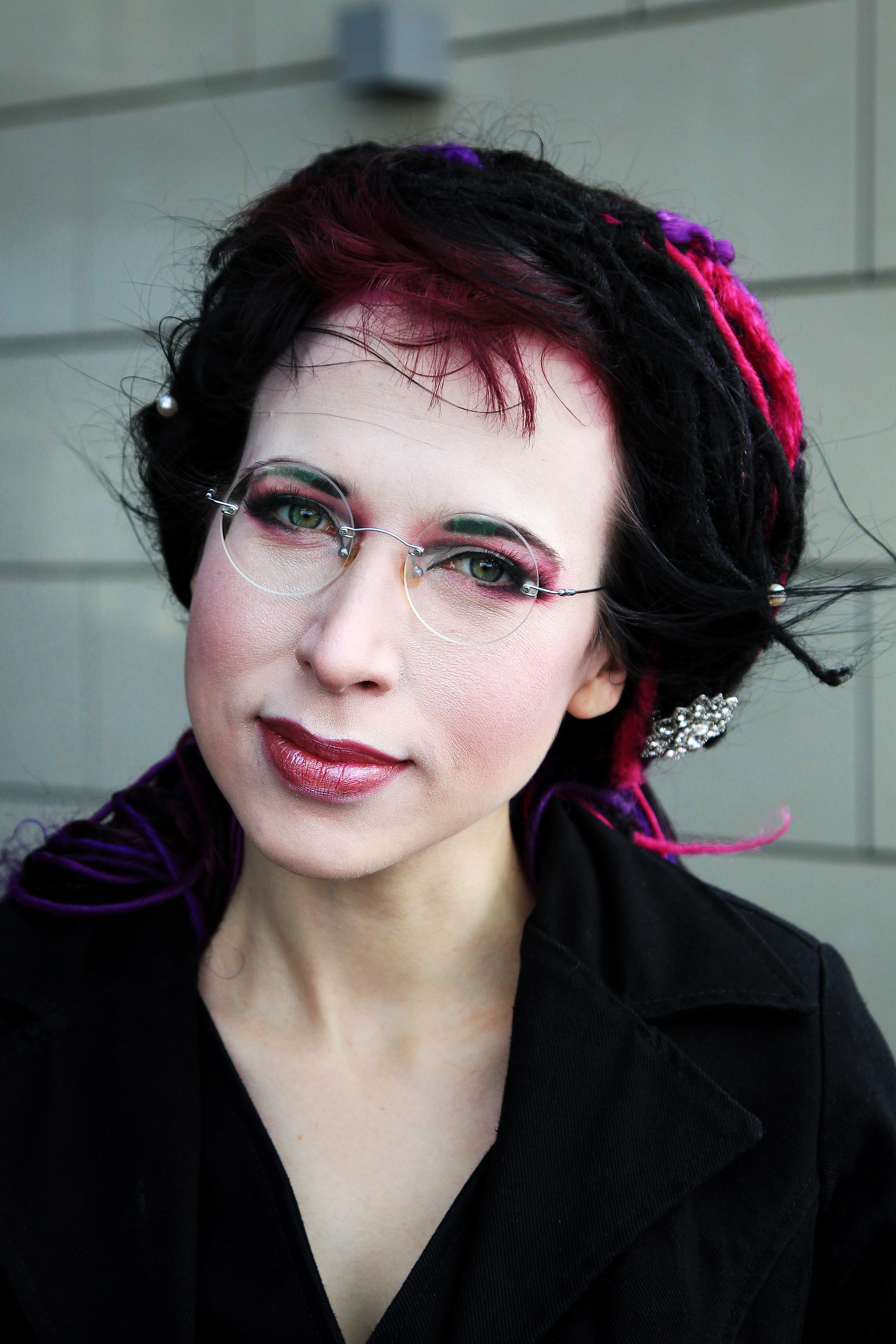
Sofi Oksanen, 2010

The following is a complete list of recipients of the Nordic Council Literature Prize:

Year	English title	Original title	Author	Country	Original Language	Ref
1962	The Days of His Grace	Hans nådes tid	Eyvind Johnson	Sweden	Swedish	
1963	Under the North Star 3: Reconciliation	Täällä Pohjantähden alla 3	Väinö Linna	Finland	Finnish	
1964	The Ice Palace	Is-slottet	Tarjei Vesaas	Norway	Norwegian	
1965	From Hell to Paradise	Från Helvetet till Paradiset	Olof Lagercrantz	Sweden	Swedish	
1965	The Good Hope	Det gode Håb	William Heinesen	Faroe Islands	Danish	
1966	Diwan on the Prince of Emgion	Dīwān över Fursten av Emgión	Gunnar Ekelöf	Sweden	Swedish	
1967	Nye noveller	Nye noveller	Johan Borgen	Norway	Norwegian	
1968	Flight of the Eagle	Ingenjör Andrées luftfärd	Per Olof Sundman	Sweden	Swedish	
1969	The Legionnaires	Legionärerna	Per Olov Enquist	Sweden	Swedish	
1970	Anna, I, Anna	Anna, jeg, Anna	Klaus Rifbjerg	Denmark	Danish	
1971	Coast of Slaves, Ships of Slaves and Islands of Slaves	Slavernes kyst, Slavernes skibe and Slavernes øer	Thorkild Hansen	Denmark	Danish	
1972	Sju ord på tunnelbanan	Sju ord på tunnelbanan	Karl Vennberg	Sweden	Swedish	
1973	Kersantin poika	Kersantin poika	Veijo Meri	Finland	Finnish	
1974	Uden mål – og med	Uden mål – og med	Villy Sørensen	Denmark	Danish	
1975	Siinä näkijä missä tekijä	Siinä näkijä missä tekijä	Hannu Salama	Finland	Finnish	
1976	Að laufferjum and Að brunnum	Að laufferjum and Að brunnum	Ólafur Jóhann Sigurðsson	Iceland	Icelandic	
1977	I de mörka rummen, i de ljusa	I de mörka rummen, i de ljusa	Bo Carpelan	Finland	Swedish	
1978	Dalen Portland	Dalen Portland	Kjartan Fløgstad	Norway	Norwegian	
1979	Pubertet	Pubertet	Ivar Lo-Johansson	Sweden	Swedish	
1980	Vredens barn	Vredens barn	Sara Lidman	Sweden	Swedish	
1981	Hauströkkrið yfir mér	Hauströkkrið yfir mér	Snorri Hjartarson	Iceland	Icelandic	
1982	Samuels bok	Samuels bok	Sven Delblanc	Sweden	Swedish	
1983	Om fjorten dage	Om fjorten dage	Peter Seeberg	Denmark	Danish	
1984	The Christmas Oratorio	Juloratoriet	Göran Tunström	Sweden	Swedish	
1985	A Day in Ostrobothnia	Pohjanmaa	Antti Tuuri	Finland	Finnish	
1986	Líkasum	Líkasum	Rói Patursson	Faroe Islands	Faroese	
1987	Hudløs himmel	Hudløs himmel	Herbjørg Wassmo	Norway	Norwegian	
1988	Justice Undone	Grámosinn glóir	Thor Vilhjálmsson	Iceland	Icelandic	
1989	Roman 1987	Roman 1987	Dag Solstad	Norway	Norwegian	
1990	For the Living and the Dead	För levande och döda	Tomas Tranströmer	Sweden	Swedish	
1991	The Sun, My Father	Beaivi, áhčážan	Nils-Aslak Valkeapää	Sápmi / Finland	Northern Sámi	
1992	Night Watch	Meðan nóttin líður	Fríða Á. Sigurðardóttir	Iceland	Icelandic	
1993	Byen og verden	Byen og verden	Peer Hultberg	Denmark	Danish	
1994	Blackwater	Händelser vid vatten	Kerstin Ekman	Sweden	Swedish	
1995	Angels of the Universe	Englar alheimsins	Einar Már Guðmundsson	Iceland	Icelandic	
1996	Hva skal vi gjøre i dag og andre noveller	Hva skal vi gjøre i dag og andre noveller	Øystein Lønn	Norway	Norwegian	
1997	Bang. En roman om Herman Bang	Bang. En roman om Herman Bang	Dorrit Willumsen	Denmark	Danish	
1998	After Having Spent a Night Among Horses	Efter att ha tillbringat en natt bland hästar	Tua Forsström	Finland	Swedish	
1999	Queen's Gate	Dronningeporten	Pia Tafdrup	Denmark	Danish	
2000	Drømmebroer	Drømmebroer	Henrik Nordbrandt	Denmark	Danish	
2001	The Discoverer	Oppdageren	Jan Kjærstad	Norway	Norwegian	
2002	The Half Brother	Halvbroren	Lars Saabye Christensen	Norway	Norwegian	
2003	Revbensstäderna	Revbensstäderna	Eva Ström	Sweden	Swedish	
2004	Juoksuhaudantie	Juoksuhaudantie	Kari Hotakainen	Finland	Finnish	
2005	The Blue Fox	Skugga-Baldur	Sjón	Iceland	Icelandic	
2006	The Ocean	Oceanen	Göran Sonnevi	Sweden	Swedish	
2007	Drömfakulteten	Drömfakulteten	Sara Stridsberg	Sweden	Swedish	
2008	Baboon	Bavian	Naja Marie Aidt	Denmark	Danish	
2009	I Curse the River of Time	Jeg forbanner tidens elv	Per Petterson	Norway	Norwegian	
2010	Purge	Puhdistus	Sofi Oksanen	Finland	Finnish	
2011	Between the Trees	Milli trjánna	Gyrðir Elíasson	Iceland	Icelandic	
2012	Days in the History of Silence	Dager i stillhetens historie	Merethe Lindstrøm	Norway	Norwegian	
2013	The Prophets of Eternal Fjord	Profeterne fra Evighedsfjorden	Kim Leine	Denmark	Danish	
2014	Mirage 38	Hägring 38	Kjell Westö	Finland	Swedish	
2015	Andvake, Olavs draumar and Kveldsvævd	Andvake, Olavs draumar and Kveldsvævd	Jon Fosse	Norway	Norwegian	
2016	Songs and Formulae	Sånger och formler	Katarina Frostenson	Sweden	Swedish	
2017	Memories of Love	Erindring om kærligheden	Kirsten Thorup	Denmark	Danish	
2018	Hotel Silence	Ör	Auður Ava Ólafsdóttir	Iceland	Icelandic	
2019	After the Sun	Efter Solen	Jonas Eika	Denmark	Danish	
2020	Who killed Bambi?	Vem dödade bambi?	Monika Fagerholm	Finland	Swedish	
2021	Flower Valley	Naasuliardarpi	Niviaq Korneliussen	Greenland	Greenlandic	
2022	On the Calculation of Volume I, II and III	Om udregning af rumfang I, II and III	Solvej Balle	Denmark	Danish	
2023	Remember Us to Life	Ihågkom oss till liv	Joanna Rubin Dranger	Sweden	Swedish	
2024	Walking Man	Fars rygg	Niels Fredrik Dahl	Norway	Norwegian	
2025	Black Orchid	Svørt orkidé	Vónbjørt Vang	Faroe Islands	Faroese	
