= Non serviam (disambiguation) =

Non serviam is a Latin phrase which means "I will not serve".

Non Serviam may also refer to:

- Non Serviam (poetry collection), a poetry collection by Gunnar Ekelöf
- Non Serviam (album), a music album by Rotting Christ
- Non Serviam (Lem), a fictional book, a subject of a fictional review by Stanisław Lem
