= Byen og verden =

1993 novel by Peer Hultberg

- First edition
- Author: Peer Hultberg
- Language: Danish
- Published: 1993
- Publisher: Lindhardt og Ringhof
- Publication place: Denmark
- Awards: Nordic Council's Literature Prize of 1993

Byen og verden (lit. The City and the World) is a 1993 novel by Danish author Peer Hultberg. It won the Nordic Council's Literature Prize in 1993.
