= Gymnosophy =

Former philosophical movement

Gymnosophy (from Greek γυμνός gymnós "naked" and σοφία sophía "wisdom") was a movement practiced in Europe and the US from the end of the 19th century to the mid 20th century. The practice involved nudity, asceticism, and meditation.

== History ==
In the early 20th century, the term was appropriated by several groups to denote a broad philosophy that included as a central thought that the nude human body is a natural condition and should be widely acceptable for the betterment of society. This philosophy is related closely, and often interchangeably, with nudism and naturism, and has close connection to the hippie movement.

The movement is known by mainly three organisations: the English Gymnosophical Society, Société Internationale de Gymnosophie, and the American Gymnosophical Association. In 1919, the Yoga teacher Blanche DeVries opened a Yoga Gymnosophy Institute in New York that combined Oriental Dance and Yoga. The English Gymnosophical Society was founded in 1922 and became The New Gymnosophy Society in 1926. One of the first members was Gerald Gardner, who in 1945 established the Five Acres Club, ostensibly as a nudist club, but as a front for Wiccans, as this was illegal in England until 1951. The Societe Internationale de Gymnosophie was founded in 1926 in France.

Dr. Maurice Parmelee (1882-1969), professor of sociology at the City College of New York, wrote from 1923 to 1924 a book, The New Gymnosophy; its title was changed to Nudism In Modern Life in later editions. He took part in the founding of the American Gymnosophical Association circa 1930.

In 1932, Rochester Gymnosophy League was founded in Bushnell's Basin. In 1933 the Dunedin Gymnosophy Club was founded in New Zealand. The biochemist and historian Joseph Needham was known to practice gymnosophy.

In the last decade, the word gymnosophy has begun to be used as a term for a new, more spiritual and holistic, free body culture.

== In popular culture ==
A poem from the book Non Serviam (1945) by the Swedish author Gunnar Ekelöf is named "Gymnosofisten" ("The Gymnosophist").

== See also ==
- Havelock Ellis
- History of the hippie movement
- Lebensreform
- Naked yoga
- Nudism
