= Siinä näkijä missä tekijä =

Novel by Hannu Salama

- First edition
- Author: Hannu Salama
- Language: Finnish
- Published: 1972
- Publisher: Otava Oy
- Publication place: Finland
- Awards: Nordic Council's Literature Prize of 1975

Siinä näkijä missä tekijä is a 1972 novel by Finnish author Hannu Salama. It won the Nordic Council's Literature Prize in 1975.
