= Vredens barn =

Novel by Sara Lidman

- First edition
- Author: Sara Lidman
- Language: Swedish
- Published: 1979
- Publisher: Bonnier
- Publication place: Sweden
- Awards: Nordic Council's Literature Prize of 1980

Vredens barn (lit. Children of Wrath) is a 1979 novel by Swedish author Sara Lidman. It won the Nordic Council's Literature Prize in 1980.
