= Ólafur Jóhann Sigurðsson =

Ólafur Jóhann Sigurðsson (26 September 1918 – 30 July 1988) was an Icelandic novelist, short story writer and poet.

His style was social realism. His published works include five volumes of short stories, six novels, two short novels, four children's books and four collections of poetry. His writings have been translated into eighteen languages.

In 1976 Ólafur Jóhann was awarded the Nordic Council's Literature Prize for his poetry collections Að laufferjum (At the Leaf-Ferry) and Að brunnum (By the Spring). Two books of his work are available in English; the novella Pastor Bodvar's Letter (Bréf séra Böðvars) from Penumbra Press, and the short story collection The Stars of Constantinople from Louisiana State University Press.

Ólafur Jóhann Sigurðsson was the father of Ólafur Jóhann Ólafsson, also a novelist and a short story writer.

== Bibliography ==
- 1934 Við Álftavatn
- 1935 Um sumarkvöld
- 1936 Skuggarnir af bænum
- 1940 Liggur vegurinn þangað ?
- 1940 Kvistir í altarinu
- 1944 Fjallið og draumurinn
- 1945 Teningar í tafli
- 1947 Speglar og fiðrildi
- 1947 Litbrigði jarðarinnar
- 1951 Vorköld jörð
- 1952 Nokkrar vísur um veðrið og fleira
- 1955 Gangvirkið
- 1955 Á vegamótum
- 1959 Ljósir dagar
- 1965 Leynt og ljóst
- 1965 Bréf séra Böðvars
- 1972 Seint á ferð
- 1972 Að laufferjum
- 1972 Hreiðrið
- 1974 Að brunnum
- 1977 Seiður og hélog
- 1978 Virki og vötn
- 1979 Í gestanauð : sögur 1940–1945
- 1979 Margs er að gæta : sögur 1945–1962
- 1983 Drekar og smáfuglar. Úr fórum blaðamanns
- 1988 Að lokum. Kvæði.
- 1993 Sagnaúrval 1939–1965
- 1995 Kvæði
