= Sju ord på tunnelbanan =

Book by Karl Vennberg

- First edition
- Author: Karl Vennberg
- Language: Swedish
- Genre: poetry
- Published: 1972
- Publisher: Albert Bonniers Förlag
- Publication place: Sweden
- Awards: Nordic Council's Literature Prize of 1972

Sju ord på tunnelbanan (lit. Seven Words on the Metro) is a 1972 poetry collection novel by Swedish poet Karl Vennberg. It won the Nordic Council's Literature Prize in 1972.
