= Joanna Rubin Dranger =

Swedish writer and artist (born 1970)

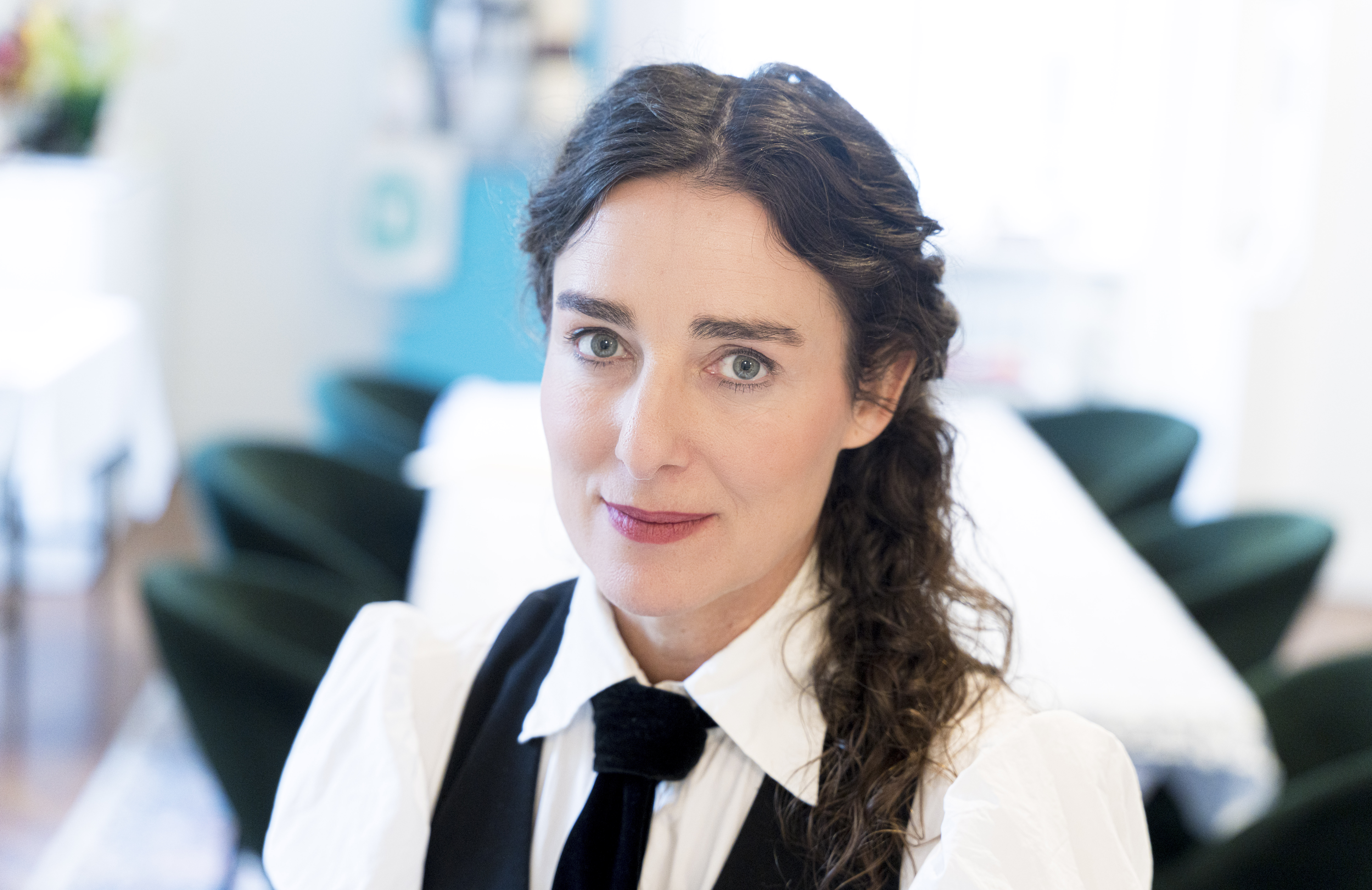
- Joanna Rubin Dranger 2023. Photo Karl Gabor.
- Born: Anna Joanna Dranger; March 1, 1970 (age 56); Stockholm, Sweden
- Occupations: Author, cartoonist, illustrator, graphic novelist
- Writing career
- Notable works: Miss Scaredy-Cat and Love, Miss Remarkable and Her Career
- Notable awards: Nordic Council's Literature Prize (2023)
- Website: www.joannarubindranger.com

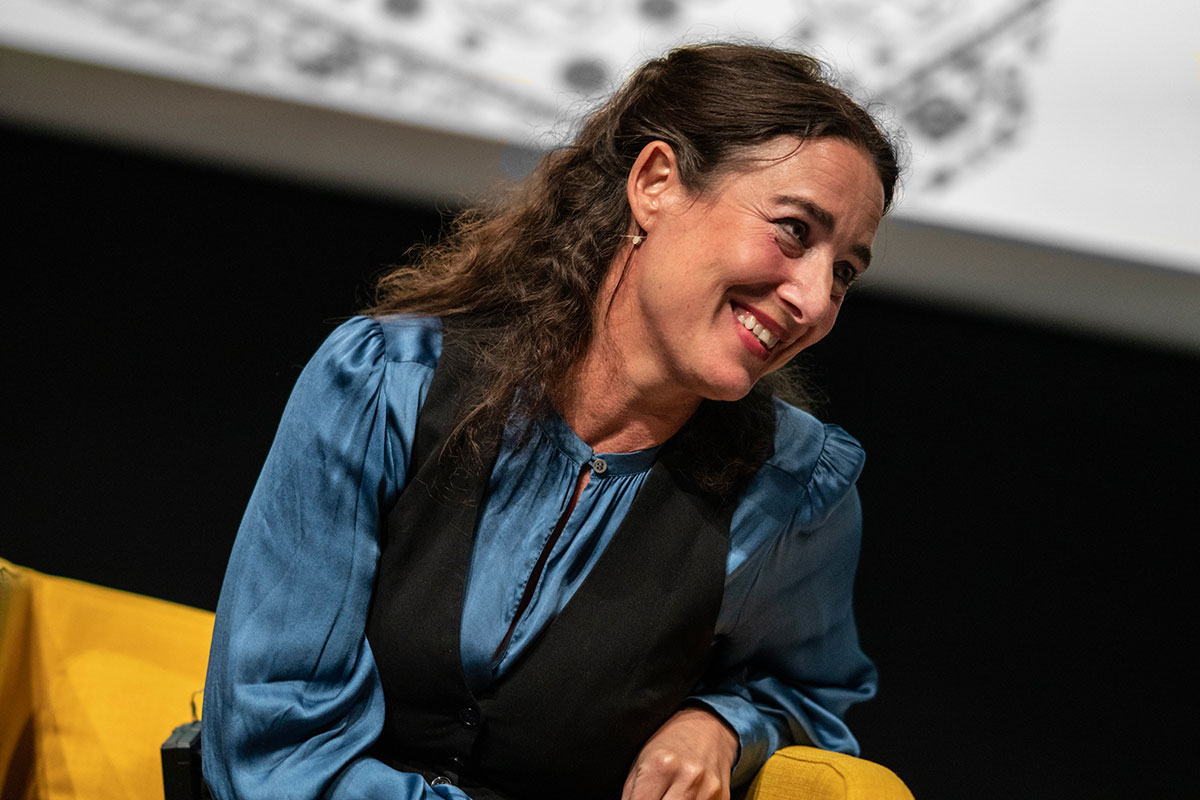
LiteratureXcange Festival in Aarhus, Denmark (2024) Photo Hreinn Gudlaugsson

Joanna Rubin Dranger (born March 1, 1970, in Stockholm as Anna Joanna Dranger) is a Swedish author, cartoonist, children's book's artist and illustrator best known for her graphic novels Miss Scaredy-Cat and Love and Miss Remarkable and Her Career.

Rubin Dranger is a professor in illustration at the Department of Design, Craft and Arts of the University College of Arts, Crafts and Design (Konstfack) in Stockholm, where she shares responsibility for the MA programme in Visual Communication.

She was awarded the Nordic Council's Literature Prize in 2023.

== Bibliography ==
=== Graphic novels ===
- Fröken Livrädd & Kärleken (1999)
- Fröken Märkvärdig & Karriären (2001; English translation by Maura Tavares: Miss Remarkable and Her Career, 2003)
- Askungens Syster Och Andra Sedelärande Berättelser (2005)
- Alltid Redo Att Dö För Mitt Barn (2008)
- What doesn't kill you makes you stronger (2008)
- Ihågkom oss till liv (2022)
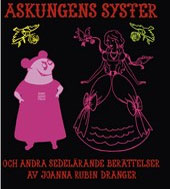
Askungens syster och andra sedelärande berättelser (2005)

=== Children's books ===
- ARG! Nittiotalets argaste bok with Anna Karin Cullberg (1989)
- LEDSEN! En helt vanlig historia with Anna Karin Cullberg (1992)
- Johannabarnet, illustrated book written by Victoria Hammar (2003)
- ARG! Tvåtusentalets argaste bok, with Anna Karin Cullberg (2004)
- Dag Drömlund, dagdrömmare, with Anders Brundin (2004)
- GLAD! (2007)
- Räkna med Nell (2009)
- Nell leker inne (2009)
- Nell på våren (2010)
- Nell på sommaren (2010)
- Nell på hösten (2010)
- Nell på vintern (2010)

=== Other ===
- Fittflickan, satirical feminist superhero parody published by the newspaper Aftonbladet (1999)
- Stamps, Fröken Livrädd & Kärleken, Svenska Posten (2002)
