= Kersantin poika =

Book by Veijo Meri

- First edition
- Author: Veijo Meri
- Language: Finnish
- Published: 1971
- Publisher: Otava
- Publication place: Finland
- Awards: Nordic Council's Literature Prize of 1973

Kersantin poika is a 1971 novel by Finnish author Veijo Meri. It won the Nordic Council's Literature Prize in 1973.
