= Øystein Lønn =

Norwegian writer (1936–2022)

- Born: 12 April 1936; Kristiansand, Norway
- Died: 10 January 2022 (aged 85)
- Occupation: writer

Øystein Lønn (12 April 1936 – 10 January 2022) was a Norwegian writer. He made his literary debut in 1966 with the short stories Prosesjonen, and followed up with the novel Kontinentene in 1967. He remained a relatively unknown writer until the 1990s, when he received several literary awards. Lønn died on 10 January 2022, at the age of 85.

== Awards ==
Lønn was awarded the Norwegian Critics Prize for Literature in 1993 for Thranes metode og andre noveller. He received the Dobloug Prize in 1992, and the Brage Prize in 1993. He was awarded the Nordic Council's Literature Prize in 1996 for Hva skal vi gjøre i dag og andre noveller ("What shall we do today and other short stories").
