= Roman 1987 =

Book by Dag Solstad

- First edition
- Author: Dag Solstad
- Language: Norwegian
- Published: 1987
- Publisher: Forlaget Oktober
- Publication place: Norway
- Awards: Nordic Council's Literature Prize of 1987

Roman 1987 is a 1987 novel by Norwegian author Dag Solstad. It won the Nordic Council's Literature Prize in 1989.
