= Between the Trees (short story collection) =

2011 short story collection by Gyrðir Elíasson

- First edition
- Author: Gyrðir Elíasson
- Working title: Milli trjánna
- Language: Icelandic
- Genre: short stories
- Published: 2011
- Publisher: Uppheimar
- Publication place: Iceland
- Awards: Nordic Council's Literature Prize of 2011

Between the Trees (Icelandic: Milli trjánna) is a 2011 short story collection by Icelandic author Gyrðir Elíasson. It won the Nordic Council's Literature Prize in 2011.
