= Hudløs himmel =

Book by Herbjørg Wassmo

- First edition
- Author: Herbjørg Wassmo
- Language: Norwegian
- Published: 1986
- Publisher: Gyldendal
- Publication place: Norway
- Awards: Nordic Council's Literature Prize of 1987

Hudløs himmel is a 1986 novel by Norwegian author Herbjørg Wassmo. It won the Nordic Council's Literature Prize in 1987.
