= Líkasum =

Book by Rói Patursson

- First edition
- Author: Rói Patursson
- Language: Faroese
- Genre: poetry
- Published: 1986
- Publisher: Mentunargrunnur Studentafelagsins
- Publication place: Faroe Islands
- Awards: Nordic Council's Literature Prize of 1986

Líkasum is a 1986 poetry collection by Faroese poet Rói Patursson. It won the Nordic Council's Literature Prize in 1986.
