= I de mörka rummen, i de ljusa =

Book by Bo Carpelan

- First edition
- Author: Bo Carpelan
- Language: Swedish
- Published: 1976
- Publisher: Schildts
- Publication place: Finland
- Awards: Nordic Council's Literature Prize of 1977

I de mörka rummen, i de ljusa (lit. 'In the Dark Rooms; in the Bright Ones') is a 1976 poetry collection by Finnish poet Bo Carpelan. It won the Nordic Council's Literature Prize in 1977.
