= Að brunnum =

Book by Ólafur Jóhann Sigurðsson

- First edition
- Author: Ólafur Jóhann Sigurðsson
- Language: Icelandic
- Genre: poetry
- Published: 1974
- Publisher: Menningarsjóður
- Publication place: Iceland
- Awards: Nordic Council's Literature Prize of 1976

Að brunnum (By the Spring) is a 1974 poetry collection by Icelandic poet Ólafur Jóhann Sigurðsson. It won the Nordic Council's Literature Prize in 1976.
