= Nye noveller =

Book by Johan Borgen

- First edition
- Author: Johan Borgen
- Language: Norwegian
- Published: 1965
- Publisher: Gyldendal
- Publication place: Norway
- Awards: Nordic Council's Literature Prize of 1967

Nye noveller (lit. New Short Stories) is a 1965 short story collection by Norwegian author Johan Borgen. It won the Nordic Council's Literature Prize in 1967.
