= Göran Sonnevi =

Swedish writer

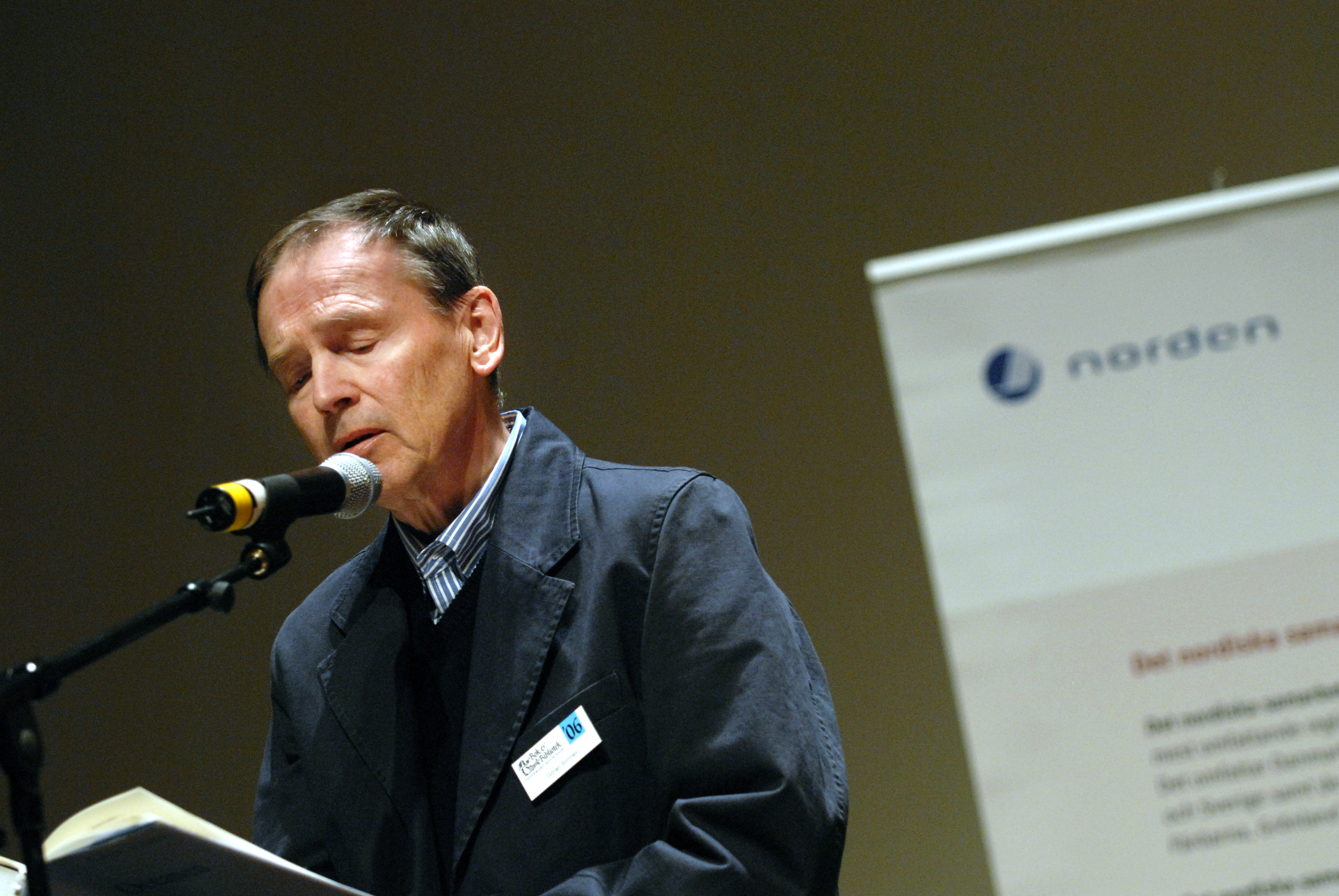
- Göran Sonnevi reading from The Ocean in 2006.
- Born: Göran Sonnevi; 3 October 1939 (age 86); Lund, Sweden
- Education: University of Lund
- Writing career
- Period: 1961–
- Notable work: The Ocean

Göran Sonnevi (born 3 October 1939 in Lund, Skåne County) is a Swedish poet and translator. Sonnevi grew up in Halmstad; he studied literature and linguistics at the University of Lund, also getting librarian training. For many years he has lived in Järfälla outside Stockholm.

Sonnevi is one of the most esteemed poets of modern Sweden and is known as well as a successful and conscientious translator (e.g. of Osip Mandelstam, Ezra Pound and Friedrich Hölderlin). Some of his poems look into topical and political matters of the contemporary scene: the Vietnam War, the Cold War and its ending phases, globalization, immigration and ethnic/cultural conflicts, 9/11 and the Iraq War (both mentioned in the long titular suite of Oceanen), but his conclusions are more searching than easy. The rhythmic and musical qualities of his free verse, with sharp line breaks in the middle of phrases or long, flowing and building lines, are present even when he brings in formal or highly specialized scientific expressions. His work has been translated into several languages.

== Awards and honors ==
In 2005, he won the Swedish Academy Nordic Prize, known as the 'little Nobel'. In 2006, he won The Nordic Council's Literature Prize for his collection Oceanen (the Ocean).

== Bibliography ==
- Outfört (1961) ('Carried out')
- Abstrakta dikter (1963) ('Abstract Poems')
- ingrepp-modeller (1965) ('Intervention Models')
- och nu! (1967) ('And now!')
- Det gäller oss. Dikter 1959–1968 (1969) ('That applies to us. Poems 1959-1968')
- Det måste gå (1970) ('It has to go')
- Det oavslutade språket (1972) ('The unfinished language')
- Dikter 1959–1973 (1974) ('Poems 1959–1973')
- Det omöjliga (1975) ('The Impossible')
- Språk; Verktyg; Eld (1979) ('Language; Tools; Fire')
- Dikter 1959–1972, rev. utg. (1981) ('Poems 1959–1972, revised edition' – two poems which were later included in Det omöjliga have been edited out)
- Små klanger; en röst (1981) ('Tiny sonorities; a voice')
- Dikter utan ordning (1983) ('Poems without order')
- Oavslutade dikter (1987) ('Unfinished poems')
- Trädet (1991) ('The Tree')
- Mozarts tredje hjärna (1996) ('Mozart's third brain')
- Klangernas bok (1998) ('Book of Chords')
- Oceanen (2005) ('The Ocean')
- Dikter i urval (2008) ('Selected Poems')
- Bok utan namn (2012) ('Book without a name')
- Sekvenser mot Omega (2017) ('Sequences against Omega')
- Det osynliga motstyckets bok (2019) ('The Book of the Invisible Counterpart')
- För vem talar jag framtidens språk (2022) ('For whom am I speaking the language of the future?')
