= Bang. En roman om Herman Bang =

Book by Dorrit Willumsen

- First edition
- Author: Dorrit Willumsen
- Language: Danish
- Subject: Herman Bang
- Genre: short stories
- Published: 1996
- Publisher: Gyldendal
- Publication place: Denmark
- Awards: Nordic Council's Literature Prize of 1997

Bang. En roman om Herman Bang (lit. Bang. A Novel About Herman Bang) is a 1996 novel by Danish author Dorrit Willumsen about Herman Bang. It won the Nordic Council's Literature Prize in 1997.
