= Thor Vilhjálmsson =

Icelandic writer

Thor Vilhjalmsson
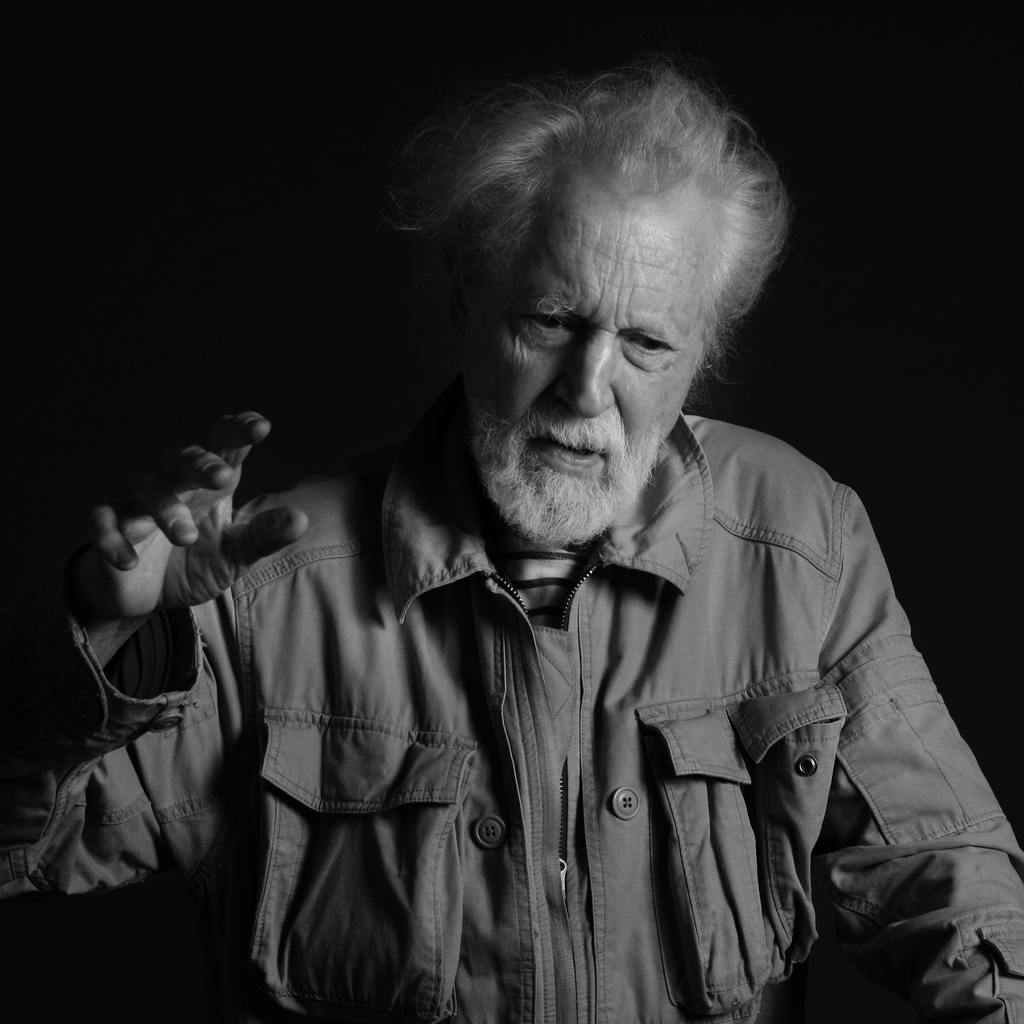
- Thor Vilhjálmsson in 2008
- Born: 12 August 1925; Edinburgh, Scotland
- Died: 2 March 2011 (aged 85)
- Occupation: Icelandic writer
- Awards: Nordic Council Literature Prize; Swedish Academy Nordic Prize

Thor Vilhjálmsson (Icelandic pronunciation: [ˈtʰouːr ˈvɪlçaulmˌsɔn]; 12 August 1925 – 2 March 2011) was an Icelandic writer. He was born in Edinburgh, Scotland. Over the course of his life Vilhjálmsson wrote novels, plays, and poetry and also did translations. In 1988 he won the Nordic Council Literature Prize for his novel Justice Undone (Icelandic: Grámosinn glóir). In 1992, he won the Swedish Academy Nordic Prize, known as the 'little Nobel'.

== Bibliography (partial) ==
- 1950 Maðurinn er alltaf einn
- 1954 Dagar mannsins
- 1957 Andlit í spegli dropans
- 1968 Fljótt, fljótt sagði fuglinn
- 1970 Óp bjöllunnar
- 1972 Folda : þrjár skýrslur
- 1975 Fuglaskottís
- 1976 Mánasigð
- 1977 Skuggar af skýjum
- 1979 Turnleikhúsið
- 1986 Grámosinn glóir (English translation Justice Undone ISBN 1-899197-10-9)
- 1989 Náttvíg
- 1994 Tvílýsi
- 1998 Morgunþula í stráum
- 2002 Sveigur
