= Uden mål – og med =

Book by Villy Sørensen

- First edition
- Author: Villy Sørensen
- Language: Danish
- Genre: essay collection
- Published: 1974
- Publisher: Gyldendal
- Publication place: Denmark
- Awards: Nordic Council's Literature Prize of 1974

Uden mål – og med is a 1974 essay collection by Danish author Villy Sørensen. It won the Nordic Council's Literature Prize in 1974.
