= Justice Undone =

Book by Thor Vilhjálmsson

- First edition
- Author: Thor Vilhjálmsson
- Original title: Grámosinn glóir
- Translator: Bernard Scudder
- Language: Icelandic
- Genre: Crime novel
- Publisher: Förlaget Svart á hvítu
- Publication date: 1986
- English publication date: 1998
- Media type: Print (hardback & paperback)
- ISBN: 1-899197-10-9
- OCLC: 32700822
- Dewey Decimal: 839/.6934 21
- LC Class: PT7511.T39 G7313 1993

Justice Undone (Icelandic: Grámosinn glóir) is a novel by Icelandic author Thor Vilhjálmsson. It was published in 1986.

This crime story is based on an Icelandic trial dating back to the 19th century when two half-siblings were accused of having committed incest. The novel pivots on the magistrate of the trial who has just returned from his studies in Copenhagen.

In 1988, Thor won the Nordic Council Literature Prize for the book. It was translated to English in 1998 by Bernard Scudder.
