= Rói Patursson =

Faroese writer and philosopher

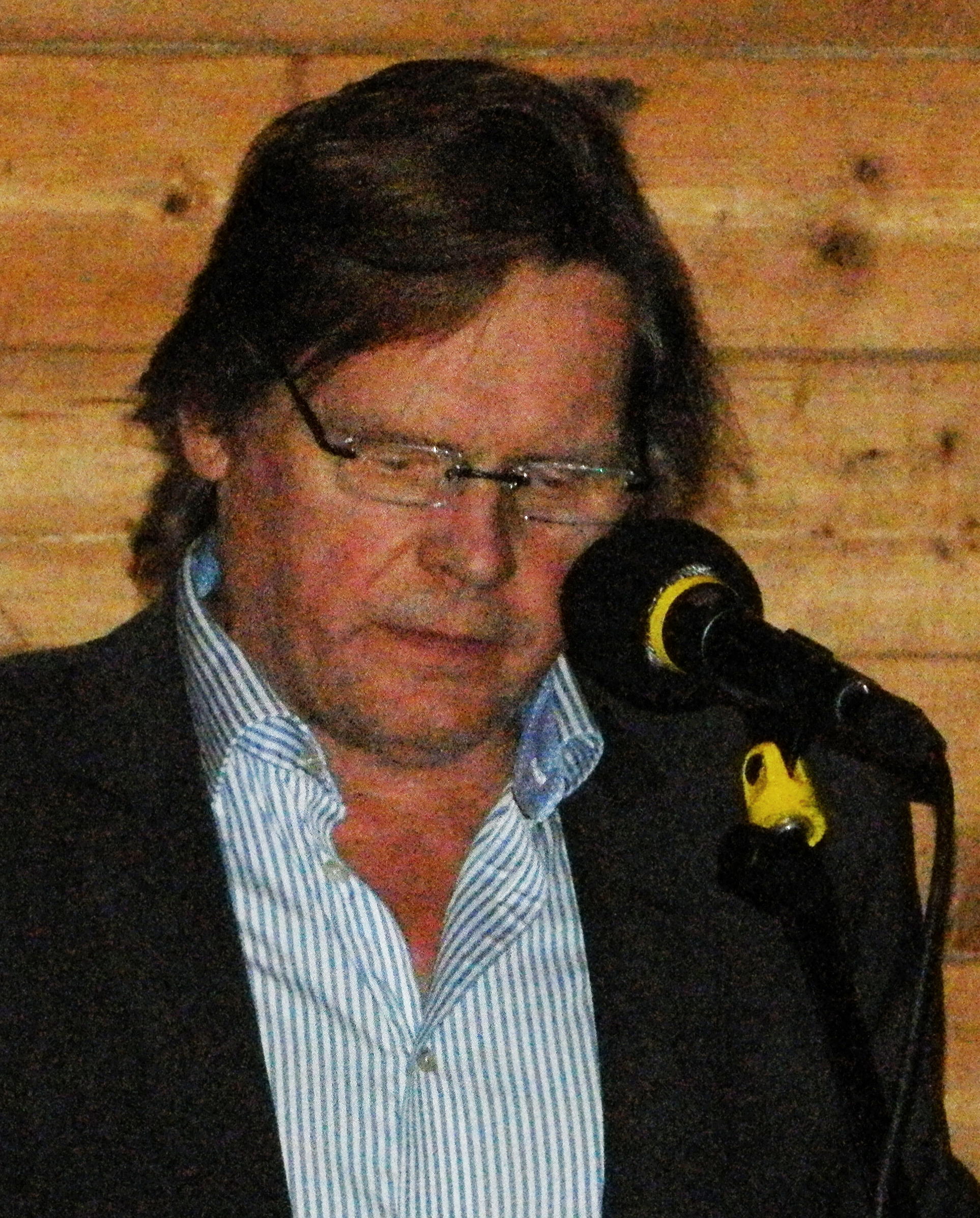
- Rói Patursson in January 2014
- Born: 21 September 1947 (age 78)

Rói Reynagarð Patursson (born 21 September 1947) is a Faroese writer and philosopher. He was also the director of the Folk High School of the Faroes.

He was born in Tórshavn, Faroe Islands. After attending the St. Frans School in Tórshavn and secondary school, Patursson went abroad from 1964 to 1965, afterwards taking various jobs in Tórshavn and Copenhagen. In 1968 he traveled across Europe, and afterwards he attended a Gymnasium until 1969.

From 1970 to 1985 he lived in Copenhagen, and in 1973 he married. He and his wife had a daughter in 1974, and a second daughter in 1981. In 1976 he began the study of philosophy at the University of Copenhagen, and received a master's degree in 1985.

Having returned to the Faroes in 1985, he taught night school and at the University of the Faroe Islands, and made transmissions for Útvarp Føroya (Radio of the Faroes). In 1987 he received the post as docent at the Skrivekunst Akademiet in Bergen, Norway. Since 1988, he has led the Folk High School of the Faroes.

Rói Patursson's literary work includes prose and poetry. In 1986, he won The Nordic Council's Literature Prize for his poetry collection Líkasum (1985). This prize is awarded to only one author per year, and Paturrsson and William Heinesen are the only Faroese writers to win to date, Paturrsson in 1986 and Heinesen in 1965.

== Works ==
- 1968 - Yrkingar (published 1969)
- 1976 - á alfaravegi
- 1983 - Spor í sjónum (pláta)
- 1985 - Líkasum
- 1987 - Amariel Norðoy

=== In Anthologies ===
- Færøske digte 1900-71, Copenhagen 1972 (ed. P. M. Pedersen).
- Rocky Shores, Paisley 1981 (ed. G. Johnston).
- Nordic Poetry Festival, New York 1993 (ed. K. Leander/ E. Malmsten).
- Färöische Dichtung aus 100 Jahren - von Djurhuus bis Poulsen (ed. Paul Alfred Kleinert, to be published in Berlin in 2007).
