= Herbjørg Wassmo =

Norwegian author (born 1942)

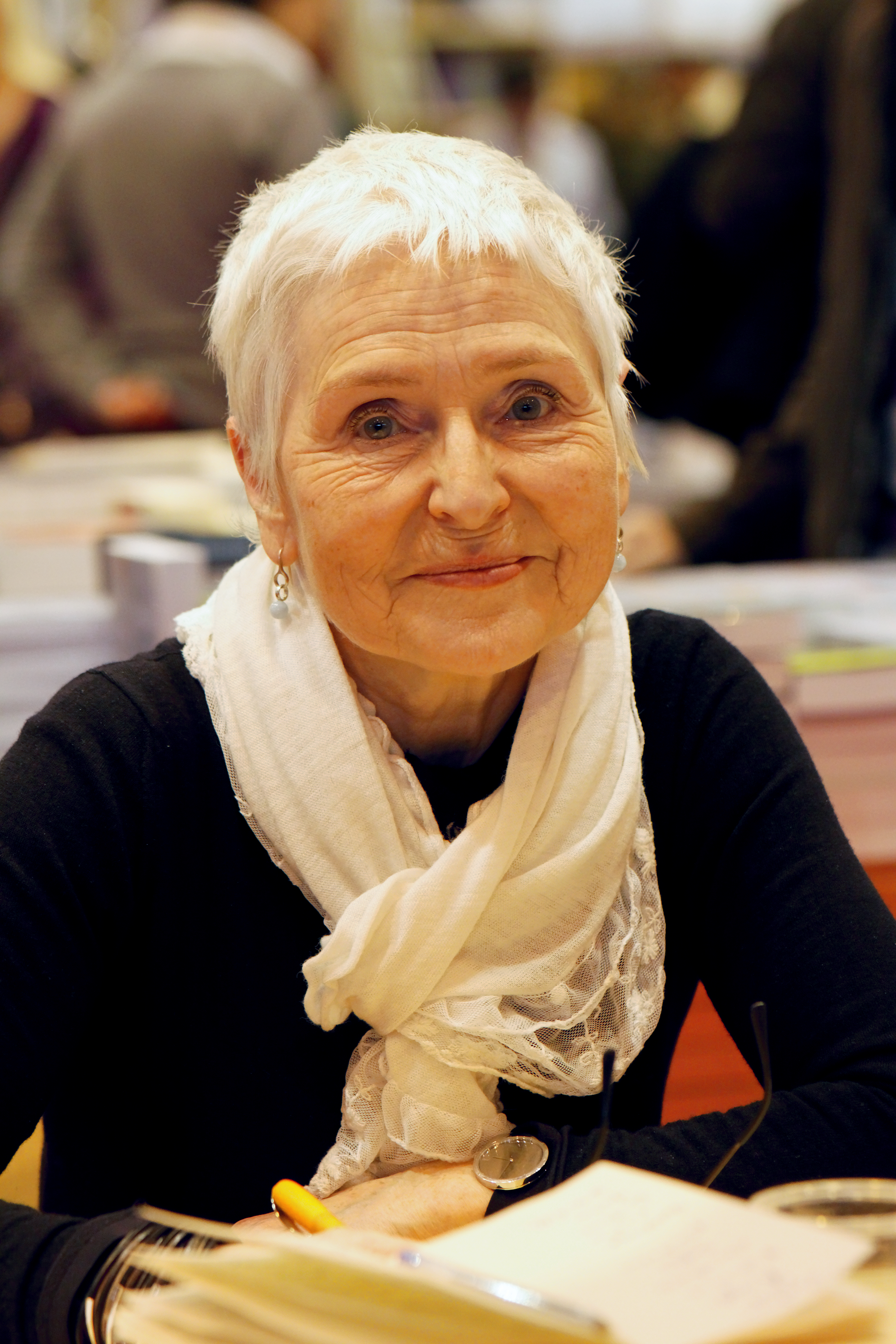
- Born: 6 December 1942 (age 83); Vesterålen
- Writing career
- Notable works: Huset med den blinde glassveranda Dinas bok
- Notable awards: Kritikerprisen; Bokhandlerprisen; The Nordic Council's Literature Prize; Knight First Class of the Order of St. Olav; Anders Jahre's Art and Culture Prize

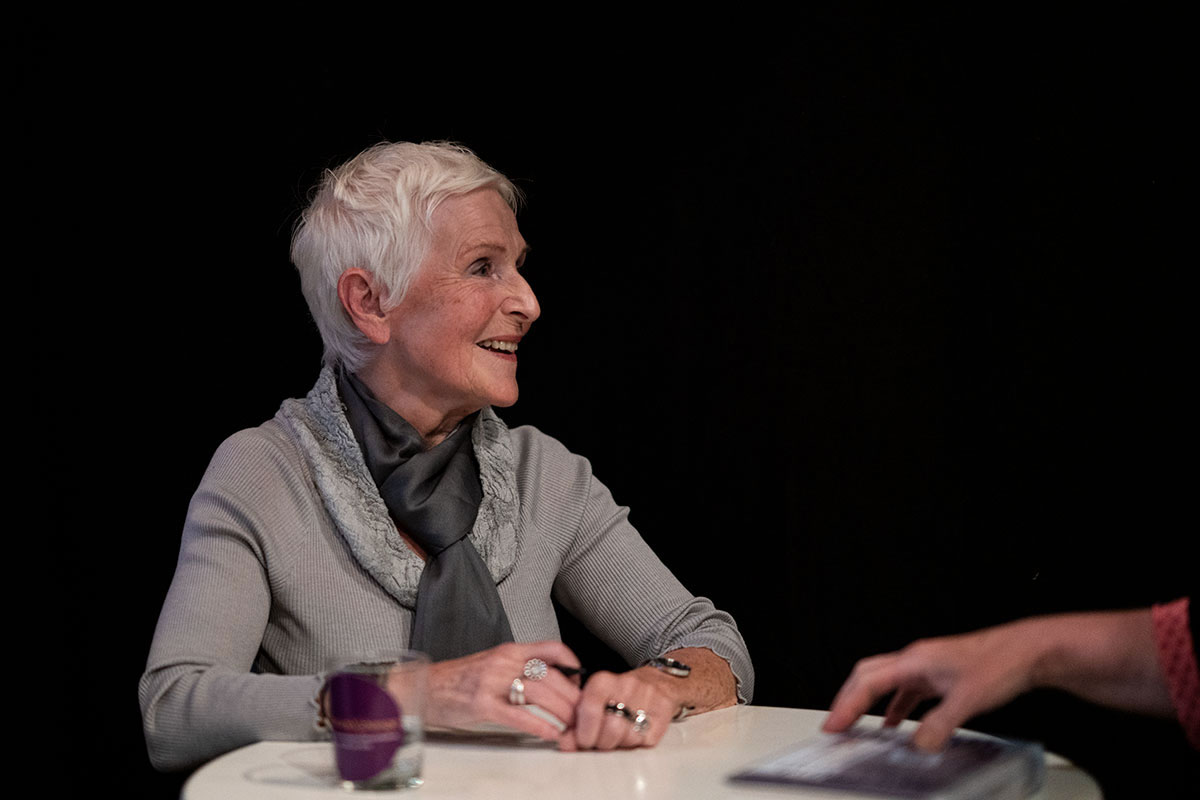
LiteratureXchange Festival, Aarhus/Denmark 2022

Herbjørg Wassmo (born 6 December 1942) is a Norwegian author.

She was born in Vesterålen and worked as a teacher in northern Norway until beginning her career as an author. Her first published work was a collection of poems, Vingeslag ("Beating of Wings"). Her major breakthrough was her first novel, Huset med den blinde glassveranda ("The House with the Blind Glass Porch") in 1981.

Her 1989 novel, Dinas bok (Dina's Book), was made into a film titled I Am Dina in 2002, starring Maria Bonnevie and Gérard Depardieu.

== Bibliography ==
- Vingeslag (poetry, 1976)
- Flotid (poetry, 1977)
- Huset med den blinde glassveranda (novel - Volume I of the Tora trilogy, 1981 - published in English as The House with the Blind Glass Windows)
- Det stumme rommet (novel - Volume II of the Tora trilogy, 1983)
- Juni-vinter (play, 1983)
- Veien å gå (documentary novel, 1984)
- Mellomlanding (play, 1985)
- Hudløs himmel (novel - Volume III of the Tora trilogy, 1986)
- Dinas bok (novel - Volume I of the Dina tetralogy, 1989 - published in English translation as Dina's Book)
- Lite grønt bilde i stor blå ramme (poetry, 1991)
- Lykkens sønn (novel - Volume II of the Dina tetralogy, 1992 - published in English translation as Dina's Son)
- Reiser - fire fortellinger (1995)
- Hemmelig torsdag i treet (children's book, 1996)
- Karnas arv (novel - - Volume III of the Dina tetralogy, 1997)
- Det sjuende møte (novel, 2000)
- Flukten fra Frank (novel, 2003)
- Et glass melk takk (novel, 2006)
- Hundre år (novel, 2009)
- Disse øyeblikk (novel, 2013)
- Den som ser (novel, Volume IV of the Dina tetralogy, 2017 - published in English translation as The One Who Sees)
- Mitt menneske (novel, 2021)

== Prizes ==
- Kritikerprisen 1981, for Huset med den blinde glassveranda
- Bokhandlerprisen 1983, for Det stumme rommet
- Nordland fylkes kulturpris 1986
- The Nordic Council's Literature Prize (Nordisk Råds litteraturpris) 1987, for Hudløs himmel
- Gyldendal's Endowment 1991
- Amalie Skram-prisen 1997
- Prix Jean Monnét 1998 (France)
