= Hauströkkrið yfir mér =

1979 poetry collection by Snorri Hjartarson

- First edition
- Author: Snorri Hjartarson
- Language: Icelandic
- Genre: poetry
- Published: 1979
- Publisher: Mál og Menning
- Publication place: Iceland
- Awards: Nordic Council's Literature Prize of 1981

Hauströkkrið yfir mér is a 1979 poetry collection by Icelandic poet Snorri Hjartarson. It won the Nordic Council's Literature Prize in 1981.
