= Diwan on the Prince of Emgion =

1965 poetry collection by Gunnar Ekelöf

- First edition cover
- Author: Gunnar Ekelöf
- Original title: Dīwān över Fursten av Emgión
- Language: Swedish
- Publisher: Albert Bonniers förlag
- Publication date: 1965
- Publication place: Sweden
- Pages: 106

Diwan on the Prince of Emgion (Swedish: Dīwān över Fursten av Emgión) is a 1965 book of poetry by the Swedish writer Gunnar Ekelöf. It received the Nordic Council Literature Prize. In the prize motivation, the jury called the work "a cycle of poems, which in the guise of interpretations of Byzantine songs and myths, finds new and personal symbols for the experiences of the divine and of suffering and love as the basic human condition." It became the first installment in a trilogy, which continued with The Tale of Fatumeh and Guide to the Underworld.

== See also ==
- 1965 in literature
- Swedish literature
