= Hva skal vi gjøre i dag og andre noveller =

1996 short story collection by Øystein Lønn

- First edition
- Author: Øystein Lønn
- Language: Norwegian
- Genre: short stories
- Published: 1996
- Publisher: Gyldendal Norsk Forlag
- Publication place: Norway
- Awards: Nordic Council's Literature Prize of 1996

Hva skal vi gjøre i dag og andre noveller (lit. What Shall We Do Today and Other Short Stories) is a 1996 short story collection by Norwegian author Øystein Lønn. It won the Nordic Council's Literature Prize in 1996.
