= Gyrðir Elíasson =

Icelandic writer

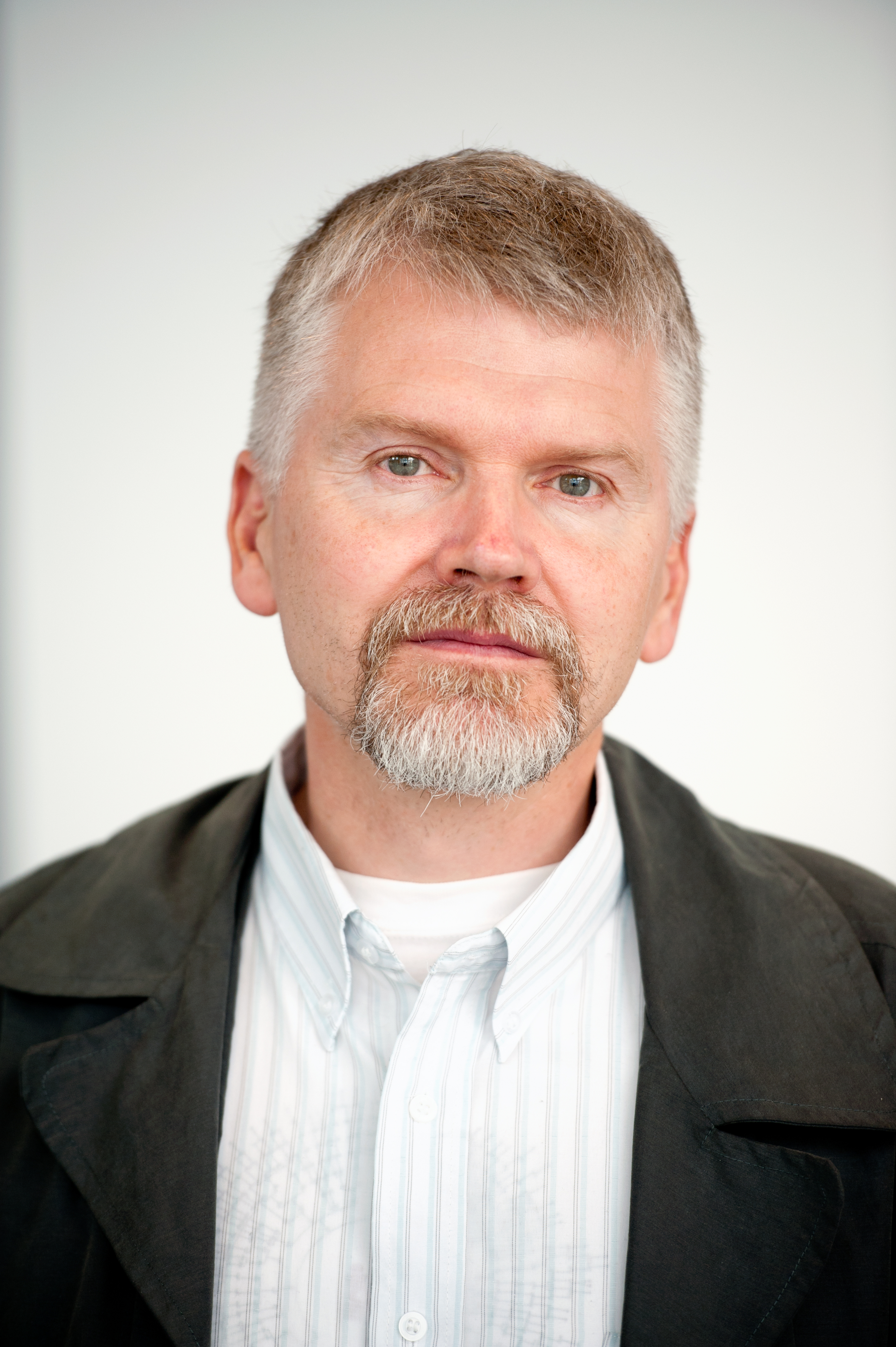
Gyrðir Elíasson, winner of the Nordic Council Literature Prize 2011

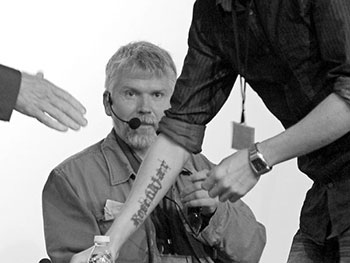
Gyrðir Elíasson 2011

Gyrðir Elíasson (born 4 April 1961) is an author and translator in Iceland.

== Life and Literary Career ==
Gyrðir was born in Reykjavík, but was raised in Sauðarkrókur, a small town in the northern part of the country. He graduated from the Fjölbrautarskóli Nordurlands Vestra in Saudárkrókur in 1982. While trying various academic options at universities of education, he began writing poetry. His first book, a collection of poetry titled Svarthvít axlabönd (Black-and-White Suspenders), was published in 1983.

He also began translating works into Icelandic, considering it the duty of Icelandic writers to give a hand in translations. Among his translations are four works by Richard Brautigan. He also has an interest in works about the indigenous peoples of the Americas.

Gyrðir has written seven novels, eleven volumes of short stories, 18 volumes of poetry and five books of prose. His style is called "highly personal" among other things.

Gyrðir lived in Garður but later moved to Reykjavík. He is married with three children.

== Gallery ==
Gyrðir Elíasson visiting Aarhus, Denmark (2011)

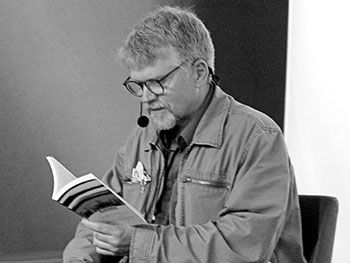

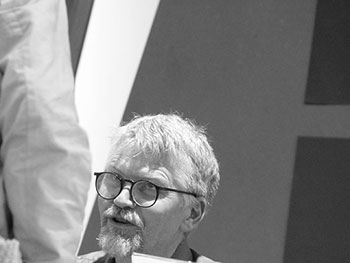

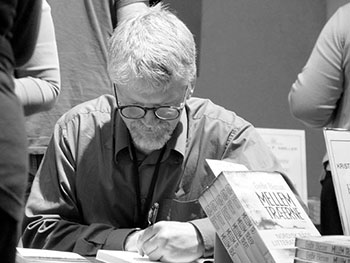

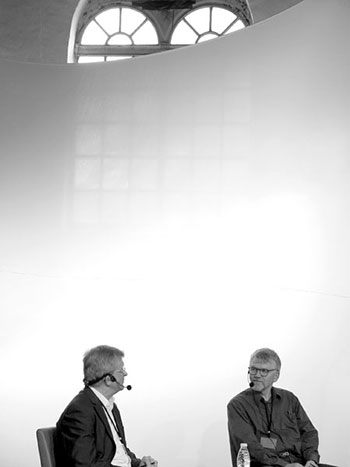

== Awards ==
Gyrðir won the prestigious Nordic Council's Literature Prize in 2011 for the short story collection Milli trjánna (Between the Trees). His collection The Yellow House was awarded both the Icelandic Literary Prize and the Halldór Laxness Prize for Literature in 2000. He has also been nominated for the Icelandic Literary Prize for Suðurglugginn (The South Window) in 2012, and the French Prix Médicis in 2022 for Sorgarmarsinn (Requiem).

== Works ==
Works in Icelandic (selected)

- Gangandi íkorni (novel, 1987)
- Svefnhjólið (novel, 1990)
- Hér vex enginn sítrónuviður (poems, 2012)
- Sorgarmarsinn (novel, 2018)
- Ótíð í víti ["Tough Times in Hell"] (2026)

Works translated to English

- The Wandering Squirrel (Gangandi íkorni) (novel)
- The Book of Sandá River (Sandárbókin) (novel)
- Stone Tree ("Steintré") (short stories, 2003)
- A Few General Remarks on the Cooling of the Sun (Nokkur almenn orð um kulnun sólar) (poetry)

Works translated to Icelandic (selected)

- "The Education of Little Tree" by Forrest Carter (novel) (Icelandic: "Uppvöxtur Litla trés")
- "Naftali the Storyteller and his Horse" by Isaac Bashevis Singer (Icelandic: "Sögumaðurinn Naftalí og hesturinn hans")
- "La doulou" by Alphonse Daudet (Icelandic: "Í landi sársaukans")
- "Childhood" by Jona Oberski (Icelandic: "Barnæska")
