= Snorri Hjartarson =

Icelandic poet (1906–1986)

- Born: 22 April 1906; Hvanneyri, Borgarfjörður
- Died: 27 December 1986 (aged 80); Reykjavík
- Occupation: poet
- Partner: Nordic Council's Literature Prize (1981)

Snorri Hjartarson (22 April 1906 – 27 December 1986) was an Icelandic poet, and a winner of the Nordic Council's Literature Prize.

== Biography ==
Hjartarson was born in Hvanneyri, Borgarfjörður. He lived in Norway for a long time and studied art at the Art Academy of Oslo under the direction of Axel Revold from 1931 to 1932. His first publication was a novel written in Norwegian in 1934, but he is known for his poetry books in Icelandic. He made his national debut in 1944. Hjartarson was a librarian at the Reykjavik City Library (Borgarbókasafn Reykjavíkur) after he moved back to Iceland. From 1942-1966 he served as City Librarian, taking over the post from Sigurgeir Friðriksson. In 1981, he was awarded the Nordic Council Literature Prize for his poetry collection Hauströkkrið yfir mér.

== Works ==
- 1934 Høit flyver ravnen
- 1944 Kvæði
- 1945 Sol er a morgun. Kvædasafn fra atjandu öld fyrri hluta nitjandu aldar
- 1952 Á Gnitaheiði
- 1966 Lauf og stjörnur
- 1979 Hauströkkrið yfir mér
- 1992 Kvæðasafn
