= The Ocean (poetry collection) =

2006 poetry collection by Göran Sonnevi

- Author: Göran Sonnevi
- Original title: Oceanen
- Language: Swedish
- Published: 2006
- Publication place: Sweden
- Awards: Nordic Council's Literature Prize of 2006

The Ocean (Swedish: Oceanen) is a 2006 poetry collection by Swedish poet Göran Sonnevi. It won the Nordic Council's Literature Prize in 2006.
