= Dorrit Willumsen =

Danish writer (born 1940)

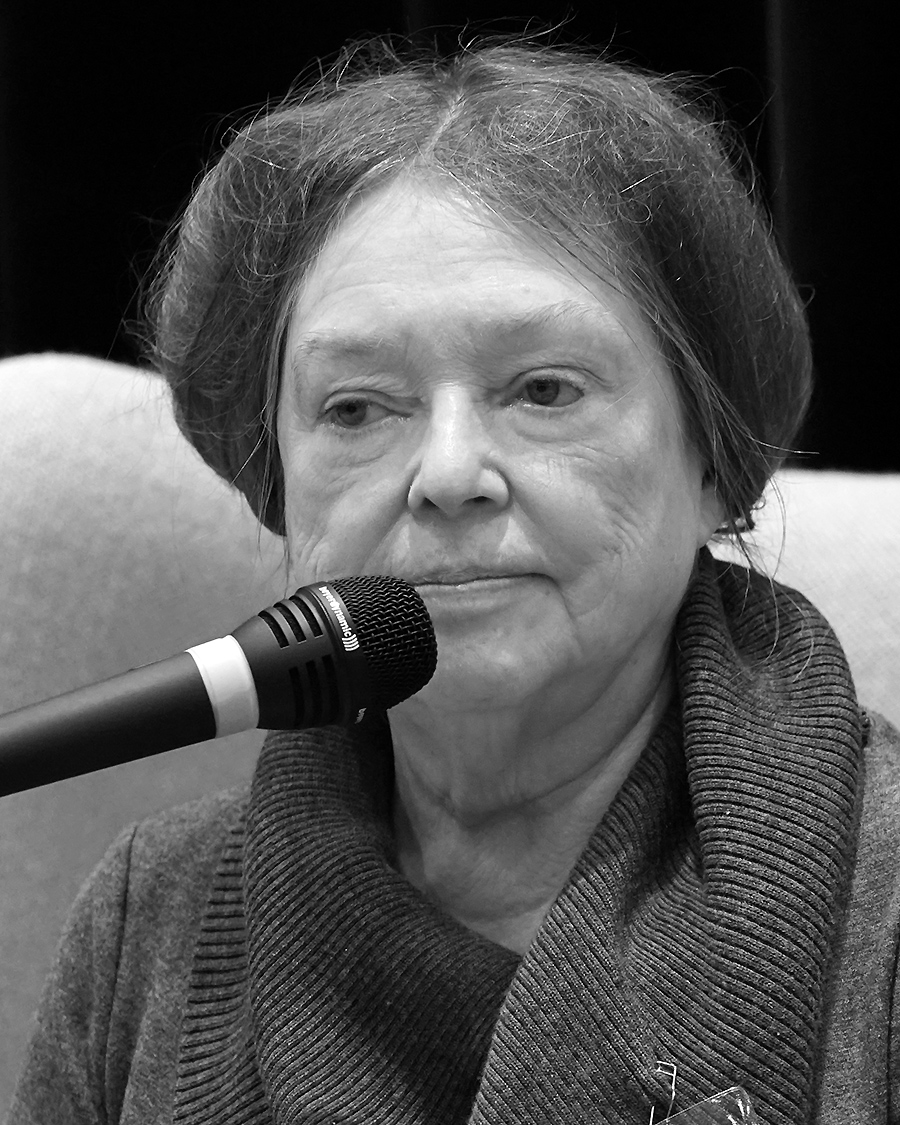
Dorrit Willumsen (2015)

Dorrit Willumsen (born 31 August 1940 in Nørrebro, Copenhagen) is a Danish writer. She made her literary debut in 1965 with the short story collection Knagen.

She was awarded the Danish Critics Prize for Literature in 1983. In 1995 she was awarded the Søren Gyldendal Prize. In 1997 she was awarded the Nordic Council's Literature Prize for the novel Bang. En roman om Herman Bang. She married the playwright Jess Ørnsbo in 1963, and their son Tore Ørnsbo (1970-) is also a writer.

== Works ==
- 1965 Knagen, short stories
- 1967 Stranden, novel
- 1968 Da, novel
- 1970 The, krydderi, acryl, salær, græshopper, novel
- 1973 Modellen Coppelia, short stories
- 1974 En værtindes smil
- 1976 Kontakter, poetry
- 1976 Neonhaven, novel
- 1978 Hvis det virkelig var en film, short stories
  - translated as If it Really Were a Film (1982)
- 1978 Den usynlige skønhed, poetry
- 1980 Danske fortællinger, short stories
- 1980 Manden som påskud
- 1982 Programmeret til kærlighed
- 1983 Umage par, poetry
- 1984 Marie: en novel om Marie Tussauds liv
  - translated by Patricia Crampton as Marie: a novel about the life of Madame Tussaud (1986)
- 1985 Caroline, play
- 1988 Suk hjerte, novel
- 1989 Glemslens forår, short stories
- 1995 Klædt i purpur, historical novel
- 1997 Bang. En roman om Herman Bang
- 1997 De kattens feriedage, humour
- 2000 Koras stemme, novel
- 2001 Tøs: et hundeliv
- 2003 Bruden fra Gent, novel
- 2005 Den dag jeg blev Honey
