= Merethe Lindstrøm =

Norwegian writer (born 1963)

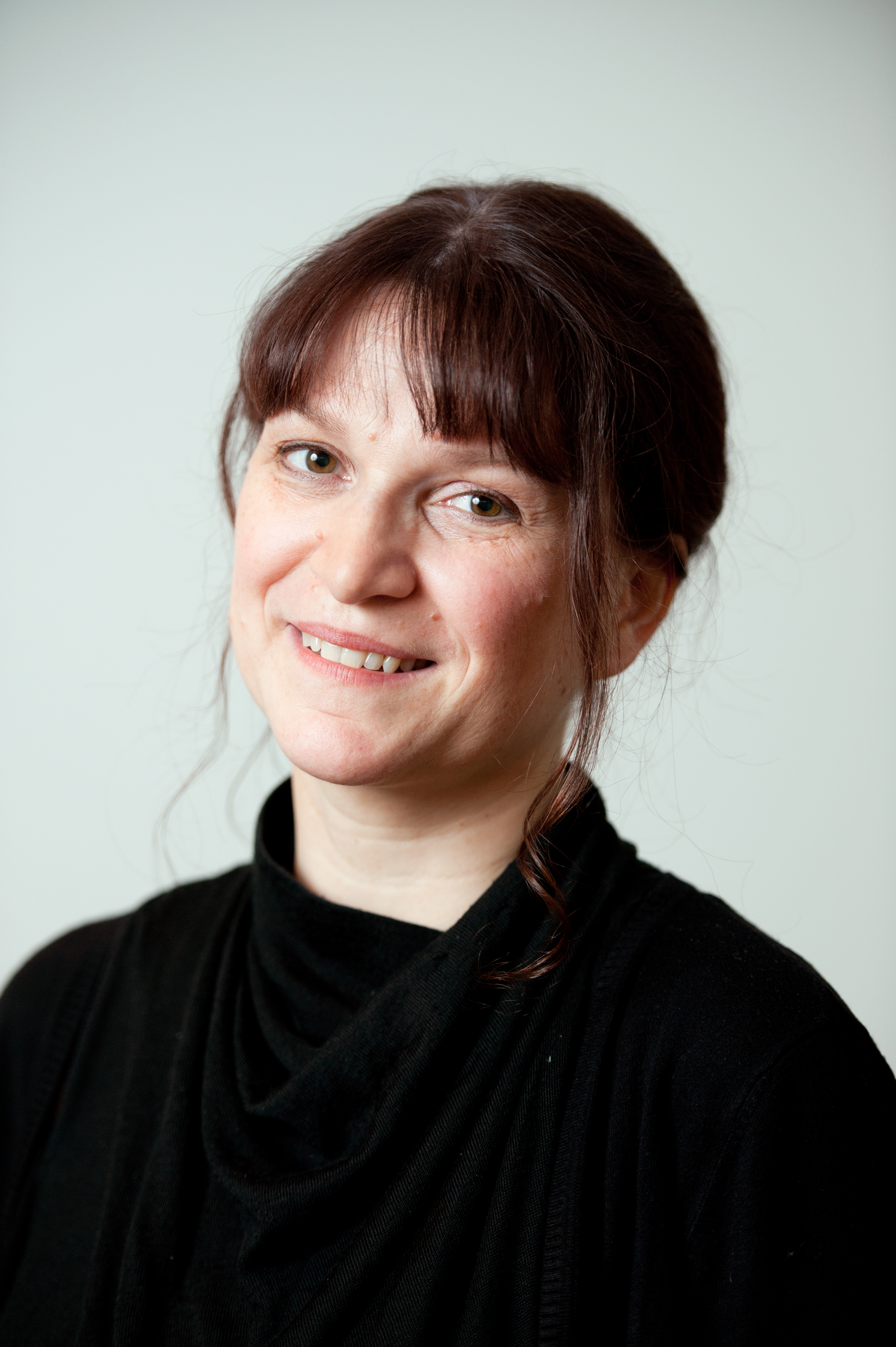
- Born: 26 May 1963 (age 63); Bergen, Norway

Merethe Lindstrøm (born 26 May 1963) is a Norwegian writer.

Lindstrøm made her literary debut in 1983 with a collection of short stories. Her first novel, The Realm of the Rain Children, was published in 1992. In 1996, she published her novel, The Stone Collectors. The 2007 collection of short stories, The Guests, was nominated for the Nordic Council's Literary Prize and the Norwegian Critics' Award. Her next book, Days in the History of Silence (2011), won both of these aforementioned awards.

Lindstrøm examines the conditions, doubts, and also the silence that exists between people who are close to each other. The Large Norwegian Lexicon described Lindstrøm as, "someone who portrays the inner pain points with disturbing precision through language."

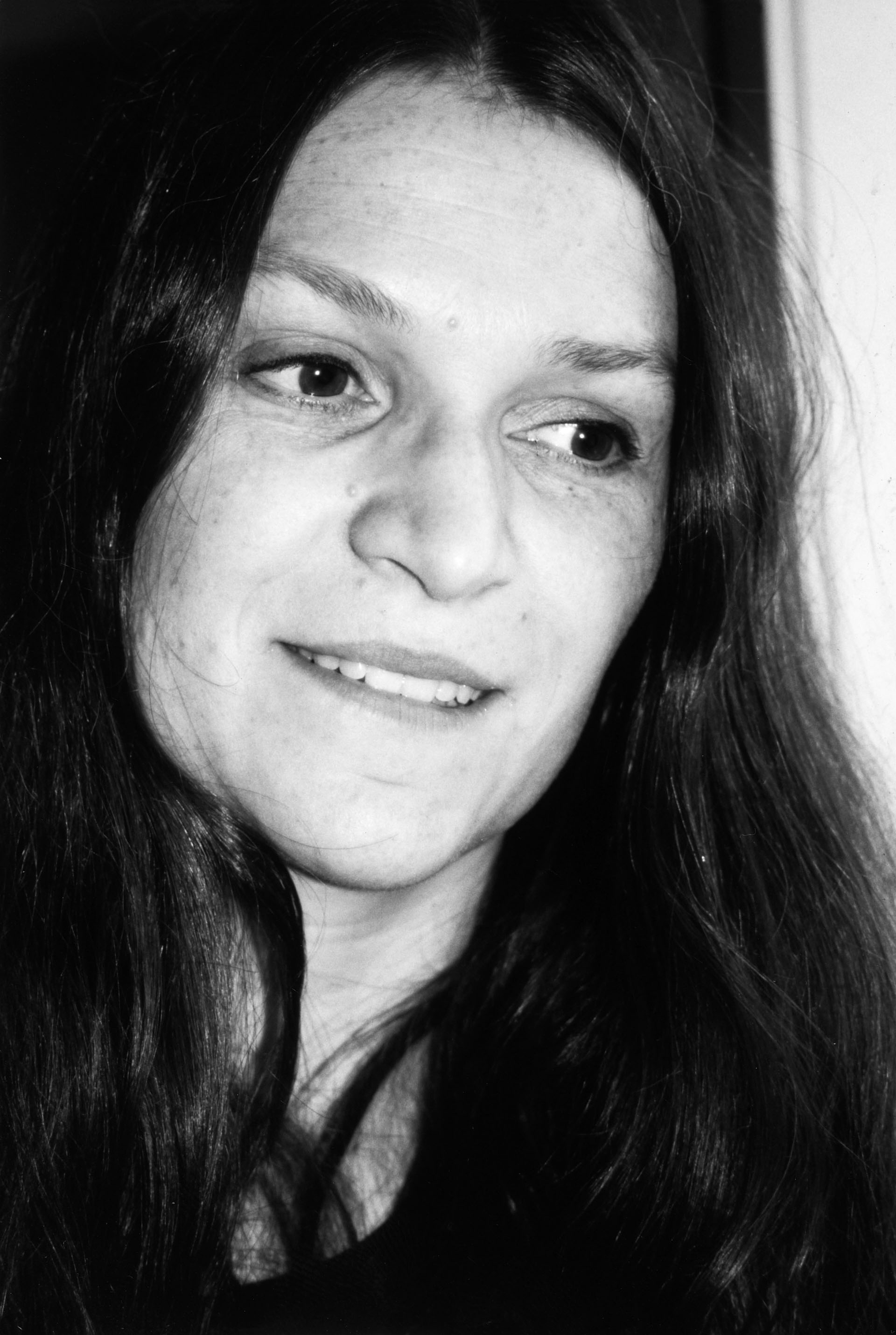

== Bibliography ==
- The Anatomy of Birds (Fuglenes anatomi) – novel (2019)
- North (Nord) – novel (2017)
- From the Winter Archives (Fra vinterarkivene) – novel (2015)
- Architect (Arkitekt) – short stories (2013)
- Days in the History of Silence (Dager i stillhetens historie) – novel (2011)
- The Guests (Gjestene) – short stories (2007)
- The Child Searcher (Barnejegeren) – novel (2005)
- Nothing about the Dark (Ingenting om mørket) – novel (2003)
- A Shelter for the Night (Natthjem) – novel (2002)
- I Know This House (Jeg kjenner dette huset) – collected short stories (1999)
- Mille og den magiske kringlen – children’s book (illustrated by Gro Hege Bergan) (1997)
- The Substitute (Stedfortrederen) – novel (1997)
- The Stone Collectors (Steinsamlere) – novel (1996)
- Svømme under vann – short stories (1994)
- The Realm of the Rain Children (Regnbarnas rike) – novel (1992)
- Kannibal-leken – short stories (1990)
- Borte, men savnet – short stories (1986)
- Sexorcisten og andre fortellinger – short stories (1983)

== Prizes and recognition ==
- Mads Wiel Nygaards Endowment – 1994
- Dobloug Prize – 2008
- Norwegian Critics Prize for Literature – 2011
- Nordic Council's Literature Prize – 2012
