= Samuels bok =

1981 novel by Sven Delblanc

- First edition
- Author: Sven Delblanc
- Language: Swedish
- Set in: 19th century Sweden
- Published: 1981
- Publisher: Bonnier
- Publication place: Sweden
- Awards: Nordic Council's Literature Prize of 1982

Samuels bok (lit. Samuel's Book) is a 1981 novel by Swedish author Sven Delblanc. It won the Nordic Council's Literature Prize in 1982.
