= Bo Carpelan =

Finnish writer (1926–2011)

Baron Bo Carpelan
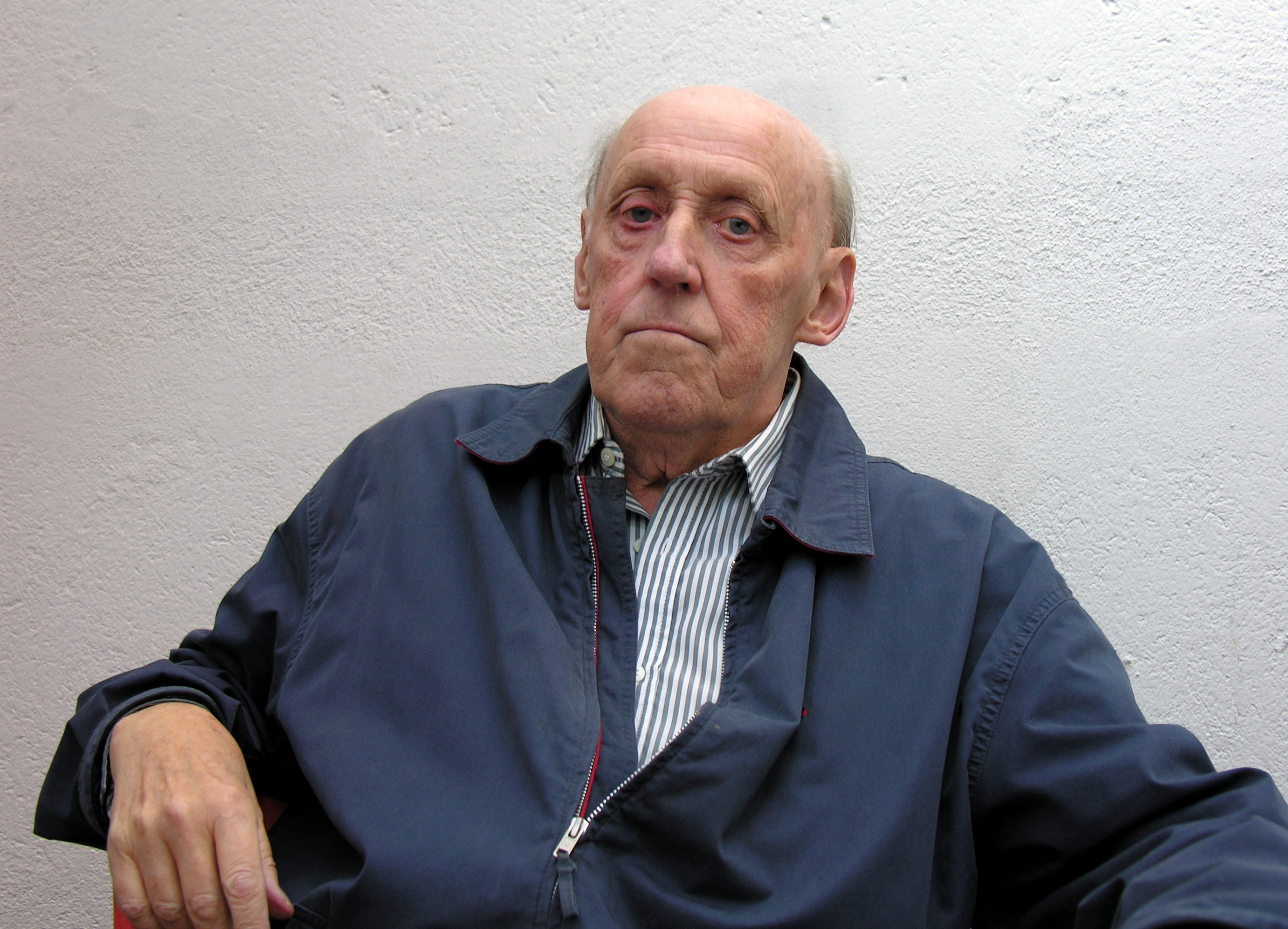
- Bo Carpelan in August 2008
- Born: Bo Gustaf Bertelsson Carpelan; 25 October 1926; Helsinki, Finland
- Died: 11 February 2011 (aged 84); Espoo, Finland
- Education: University of Helsinki
- Writing career
- Language: Swedish
- Period: 1946–2011
- Notable works: I de mörka rummen, i de ljusa Urwind; Berg
- Notable awards: Nordic Council Literature Prize 1977 I de mörka rummen, i de ljusa; Pro Finlandia Medal 1980; Finlandia Prize 1993 Urwind 2005 Berg

Baron Bo Gustaf Bertelsson Carpelan (25 October 1926 – 11 February 2011) was a Finland-Swedish poet and author. He published his first book of poems, Som en dunkel värme, in 1946, and received his PhD in 1960. Carpelan, who wrote in Swedish, composed numerous books of verse, as well as several novels and short stories.

In 1997, he won the Swedish Academy Nordic Prize, known as the 'little Nobel'. He was the first person to have received the Finlandia Prize twice (in 1993 and 2005). He won the 2006 European Prize for Literature. His other awards include the Pro Finlandia Medal in 1980, the State Literature Prize in 1967, 1970, and 1972, the Nils Holgersson Plaque for children's literature in 1968, and the Nils Ferlin Prize in 1981. His poem, Winter was Hard, was set to music by composer Aulis Sallinen. He also wrote the libretto for Erik Bergman's only opera, Det sjungande trädet.

Carpelan died of cancer on 11 February 2011. He is buried in the Hietaniemi Cemetery in Helsinki. He was a member of the Finnish noble family Carpelan. His parents were Bertel Gustaf Carpelan and Ebba Adele Lindahl. In 1954, he married Barbro Eriksson.

Carpelan went to Svenska normallyceum i Helsingfors and then studied history of literature at University of Helsinki. He became Doctor of Philosophy in 1960, with a dissertation on the poetry of Gunnar Björling titled Studier i Gunnar Björlings diktning 1922–1933. Alongside his writing career, Carpelan worked at the Helsinki City Library from 1946, serving as deputy director from 1964. He was also a literary critic for the newspaper Hufvudstadsbladet from 1949 to 1964 and served as a Professor of Arts from 1980 to 1985.

== Selected bibliography ==
- Som en dunkel värme (poetry collection, 1946)
- Anders på ön (children's book, 1959)
- Bågen (children's book, 1968)
- Gården (poetry collection, 1969)
- Rösterna i den sena timmen (novel, 1971)
- I de mörka rummen, i de ljusa (poetry collection, 1976)
- Urwind (novel, 1993)
- Berg (novel, 2005)

Carpelan also translated works into Swedish from Finnish, including books by Paavo Haavikko, Antti Hyry, and Iris Uurto.
