= Sara Lidman =

Swedish writer

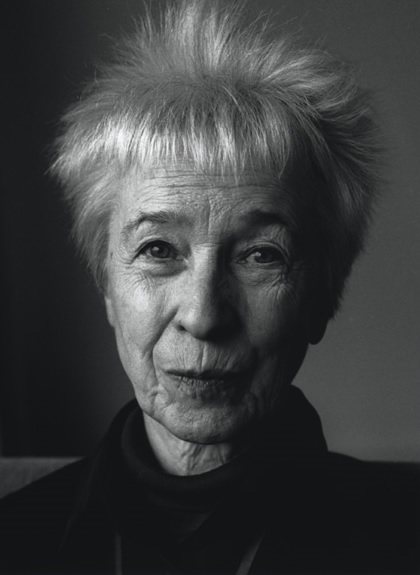
- Born: Sara Adéla Lidman; 30 December 1923; Missenträsk, Sweden
- Died: 17 June 2004 (aged 80); Umeå, Sweden
- Spouse: Hans Gösta Skarby
- Writing career
- Period: 1953–2003

Sara Adéla Lidman (30 December 1923 – 17 June 2004) was a Swedish writer.

== Early life ==
Born in Missenträsk, a village in present Skellefteå Municipality, Lidman was raised in the Västerbotten region of northern Sweden. She studied at the University of Uppsala, where her studies were interrupted when she contracted tuberculosis. She achieved her first great success with the novel Tjärdalen (The Tar Still). In this work and in her second novel Hjortronlandet (The Cloudberry Field), she explores themes of alienation and isolation. Her early novels are focused on the difficult conditions facing poor farmers in the northern Swedish province of Västerbotten during the nineteenth century.

== Career ==
Sara Lidman is arguably one of the most important writers of the Swedish language in the twentieth century. This is especially so because of her innovative method of combining spoken vernaculars with Biblical language in a way closely tied to a certain kind of popular imaginary, while also integrating the worldly and the spiritual. In connection with her first four novels, she wrote extensively on political subjects, always from a strongly socialist standpoint. She engaged in protest against the Vietnam War (including traveling to North Vietnam and participating in the Russell Tribunal) and against apartheid in South Africa. She supported the widely influential miners' strikes of 1969–1970 and was active in the Communist and environmentalist movements. Between 1977 and 1985, she wrote a series of seven novels dealing with the colonization process of the north of Sweden.

She was awarded a number of prizes, including the Nordic Council's Literature Prize for her work Vredens barn.

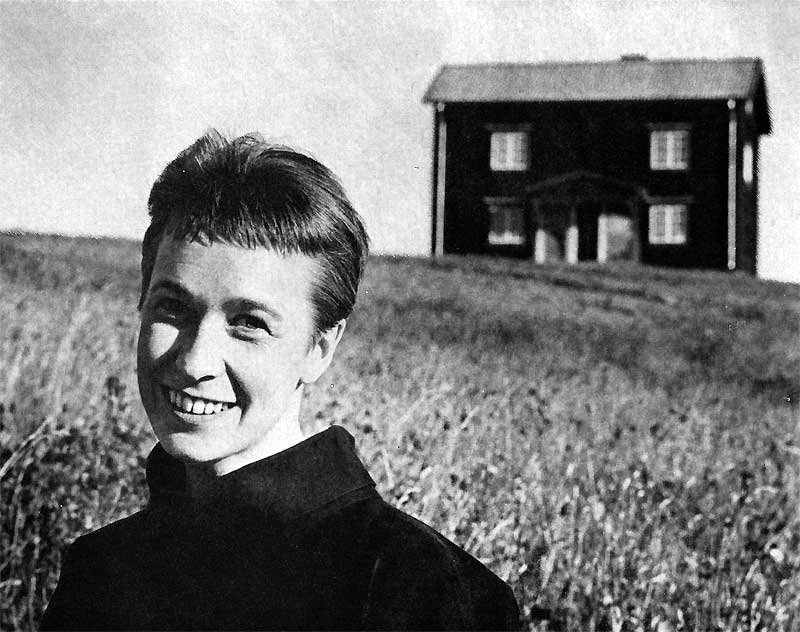
Sara Lidman in 1960

== Bibliography ==
- Tjärdalen, 1953. (The Tar Still)
- Hjortronlandet, 1955. (The Cloudberry Field)
- Regnspiran, 1958. (The Rain Bird) translated by Elspeth Harley Schubert, Hutchinson, 1963
- Bära mistel, 1960. (To Hold A Mistletoe)
- Jag och min son, 1961. (My Son and I)
- Med fem diamanter, 1964. (With Five Diamonds), 1971.
- Samtal i Hanoi, 1966, Reporting. (Conversations in Hanoi), 1967.
- Gruva, 1968, Interviews. (Mine) (Note: As in "a coal mine")
- Marta, Marta, 1970, Drama.
- Din tjänare hör, 1977. (Thy Servant Is Listening)
- Vredens barn, 1979. (Wrath's Children)
- Nabots sten, 1981. (Naboth's Stone) translated by Joan Tate, Norvik Press, 1989
- Den underbare mannen, 1983. (The wonderfull man)
- Järnkronan, 1985. (The Iron Crown)
- Lifsens rot, 1996. (The Root of Life)
- Oskuldens minut, 1999. (Innocence's Minute)
- Kropp och själ, 2003. (Body And Soul)
