= Days in the History of Silence =

Book by Merethe Lindstrøm

- First edition cover
- Author: Merethe Lindstrøm
- Original title: Dager i stillhetens historie
- Translator: Anne Bruce
- Language: Norwegian
- Publisher: Aschehoug
- Publication date: 2011
- Publication place: Norway
- Pages: 215
- ISBN: 9788203197215

Days in the History of Silence (Norwegian: Dager i stillhetens historie) is a 2011 novel by the Norwegian writer Merethe Lindstrøm. The narrative focuses on an elderly couple who struggles with the inability to talk about sensitive subjects from their past. The book received the Norwegian Critics Prize for Literature and the Nordic Council Literature Prize.

== Reception ==
Silje Stavrum Norevik of Dagbladet wrote: "It is impressive how Lindstrøm composes a small chamber play, and reflects an existence so fragile and delicate without having to resort to big words. ... The language is simple, elegant and pleasant, but the mood so suggestive in its silent drama. Lindstrøm is known as a refined short-story writer, here she shows to the fullest that she also masters the larger canvas."

== See also ==
- 2011 in literature
- Norwegian literature
