= Að laufferjum =

1972 poetry collection by Ólafur Jóhann Sigurðsson

- Author: Ólafur Jóhann Sigurðsson
- Language: Icelandic
- Genre: poetry
- Published: 1972
- Publisher: Menningarsjóður
- Publication place: Iceland
- Awards: Nordic Council's Literature Prize of 1976

Að laufferjum is a 1972 poetry collection by Icelandic poet Ólafur Jóhann Sigurðsson. It won the Nordic Council's Literature Prize in 1976.
