= Hannu Salama =

Finnish author (born 1936)

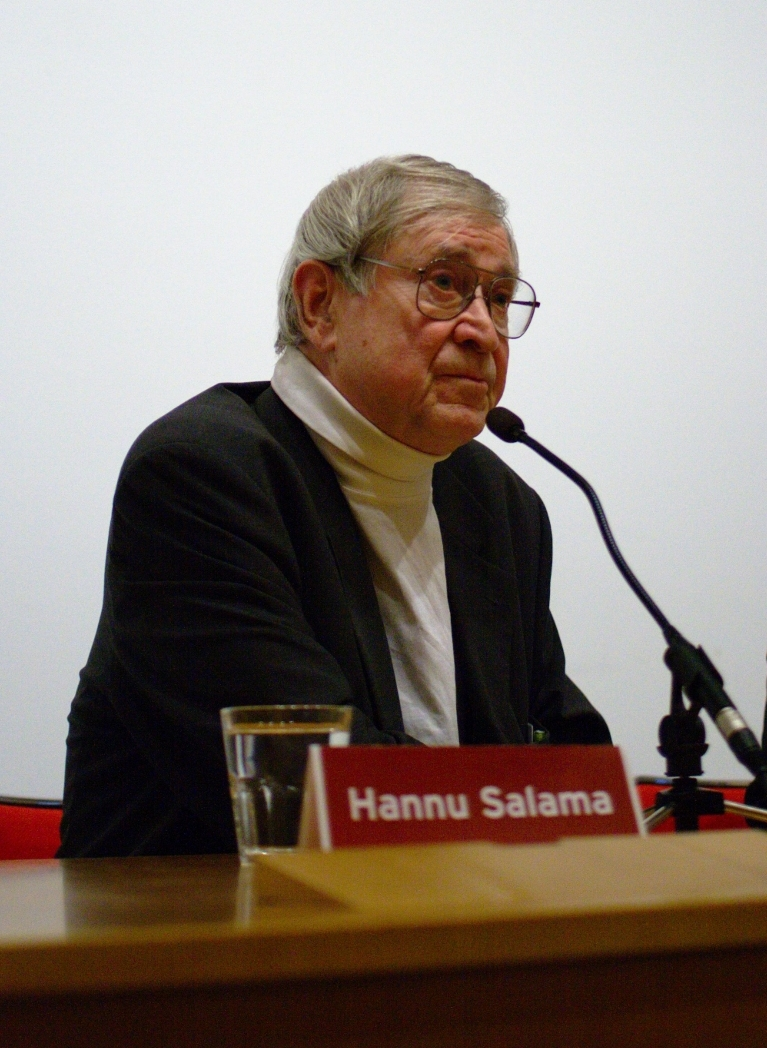
- Born: October 4, 1936 (age 89); Kouvola, Kymenlaakso, Finland
- Occupations: novelist, short story writer, essayist
- Writing career
- Notable works: Minä, Olli ja Orvokki (1967)
- Notable awards: Order of the Lion of Finland (1975); Nordic Council Literature Prize (1975); Eino Leino Prize

Hannu Sulo Salama (born 4 October 1936), also known by his pen name Aki Rautala, is a Finnish author known for his working-class themes. He was nominated for the Nobel Prize in Literature in 1969 and 1973.

== Biography ==
Hannu Salama was born in Kouvola, Kymenlaakso region in Southern Finland. He spent his childhood in the Pispala district of the city of Tampere, in a traditional working-class area with working class politics and culture. Following in the footsteps of his father, Salama first worked as an electrician and a farm hand.

=== Literary career ===
Salama's literary debut was called Se tavallinen tarina (The Usual Story) (1961). In 1966 he was convicted for blasphemy for his book Juhannustanssit (Midsummer Dances) from 1964. He was released on probation, but finally pardoned by the Finnish president Urho Kekkonen in 1968. The new editions of the book were published as censored versions up until 1990. Salama has written short stories as well as novels and won many literary awards in Scandinavia.

Despite his working-class background Salama has never admitted to be a working-class novelist. He has maintained his critical autonomy both to the left and to the right. But it has to be said that according to the two main characteristics of the working-class literature and author – a person comes from the working-class and deals with workers' world, its ordinary issues as well as controversies with the elite – he belongs to the long tradition of working-class authors.

Of Salama's books, his Finlandia Series probably enjoys the greatest literary reputation, including among all Kosti Herhiläisen perunkirjoitus, Kolera on raju bändi and Pasi Harvalan tarina I–III. Hannu Salama has also published collections of poetry. In the mid-1990s, he wrote three crime novels under the pen name Aki Rautala.

== List of works ==
=== Novels, short story and poems ===
- Se tavallinen tarina (1961)
- Lomapäivä (1962)
- Puu balladin haudalla. Runoja vuosilta 1960–62 (1963)
- Juhannustanssit (1964)
- Kenttäläinen käy talossa (1967)
- Minä, Olli ja Orvokki (1967)
- Joulukuun kuudes (1968)
- Kesäleski (1969)
- Tapausten kulku (1969)
- Lokakuun päiviä (1971)
- Villanpehmee, taskulämmin (1971)
- Siinä näkijä missä tekijä (1972)
- Runot (1975)
- Kolme sukupolvea (1978)
- Itäväylä (1980)
- Punajuova (1985)
- Amos ja saarelaiset (1987)
- Näkymä kuivaushuoneen ikkunasta (1988)
- Ottopoika (1991)
- Hyvä veli (1992)
- Pieni menestystarina (1993)
- Jatkuu huomenna (2004)
- Sydän paikallaan (2010)
- Hakemisen riemu (2014)
- Hyvästi, kirvesvarsi! (2016)
- Läheltä pitäen, kaukaa käyden (2020)

==== Finlandia series ====
- Kosti Herhiläisen perunkirjoitus (1976)
- Kolera on raju bändi (1977)
- Pasi Harvalan tarina I (1981)
- Pasi Harvalan tarina II (1983)
- Kaivo kellarissa (1983)

==== Disciples of Life series ====
- Elämän opetuslapsia I (1997)
- Elämän opetuslapsia II (1999)
- Elämän opetuslapsia III (2002)
- Elämän opetuslapsia IV (2005)

==== As Aki Rautala ====
- Kaikki naiset pitävät parabellumista (1995)
- Bipappi soittaa bebopia (1996)
- Rikoksia ilman rangaistuksia (1996)

== Prizes ==
- 1975: Order of the Lion of Finland
- 1975: Nordic Council Literature Prize
- 1985: Eino Leino Prize
- 1990: Aleksis Kivi Award
