= Peer Hultberg =

Danish author and psychoanalyst (1935–2007)

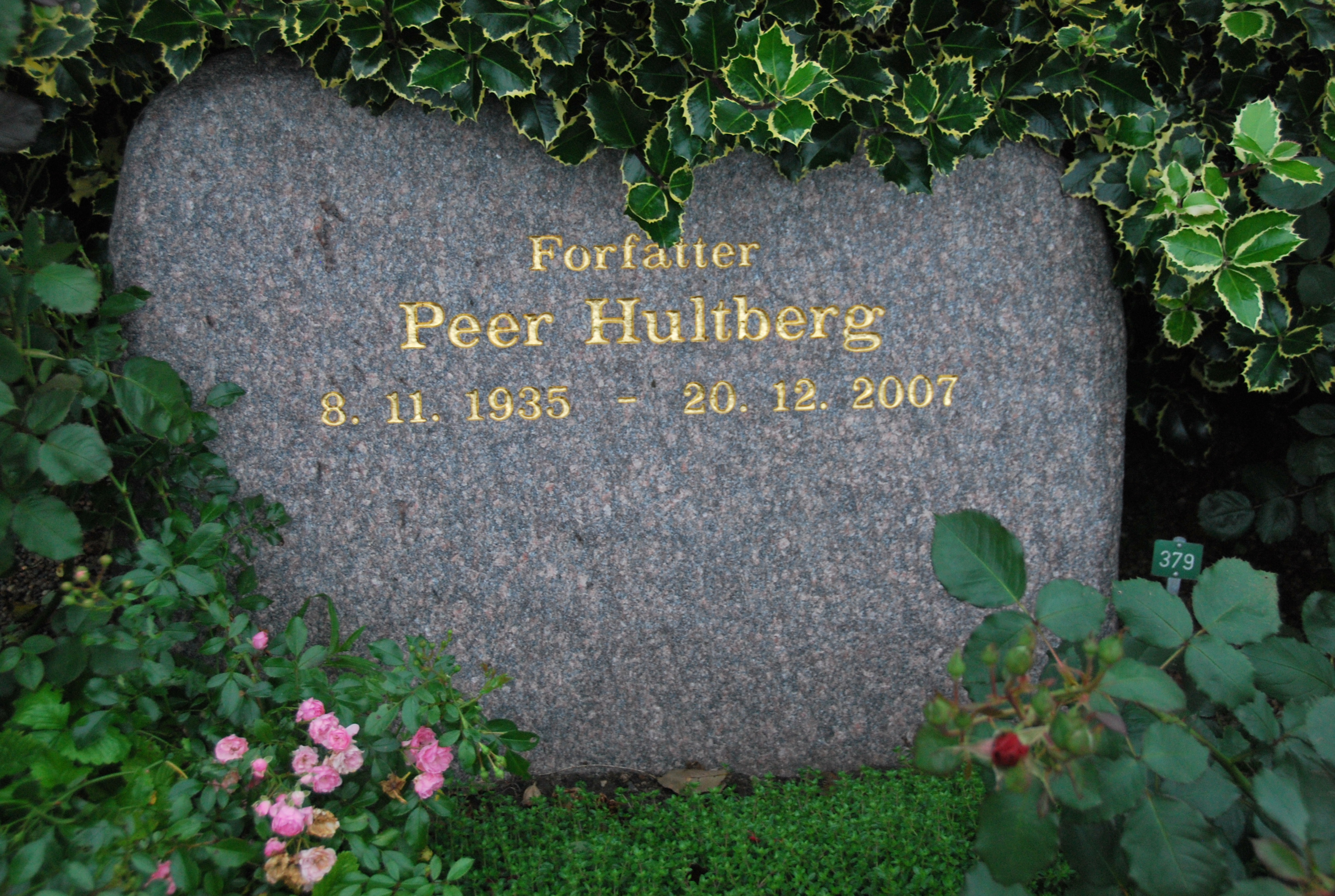
Hultberg's gravestone at Viborg Cemetery. (Photo: Lars Schmidt)

Peer Hultberg (8 November 1935 – 20 December 2007) was a Danish author and psychoanalyst.

Peer Hultberg was born in Vangede northwest of Copenhagen and lived in Horsens and Viborg during his child and teenage years. From 1953 he studied at the University of Copenhagen (French, musicology and Slavic languages). He lived for some years in Skopje and Warsaw and then moved to London in 1959. He continued his studies of Slavic languages at the University of London and achieved a B.A. in 1963.

Hultberg was a lecturer of Polish language and literature at the University of London for a couple of years while writing his thesis on the literary style of Wacław Berent. Having received his Ph.D., he moved back to his native country as a lecturer of the same subject at the University of Copenhagen in 1968. In 1973 he started studying Analytical psychology at the C. G. Jung Institute in Zürich getting a diploma in 1978.

He moved to Hamburg and worked as a Jungian analyst for several years.

His writing career started in 1968 when he publiced two novels, but his breakthrough came with Requiem from 1985, a novel of 611 pages and 537 chapters. His other major achievement is Byen og verden from 1992 for which he was awarded the Danish Critics' Prize and later Nordic Council's Literature Prize. In 2004, Hultberg received the Grand Prize of the Danish Academy.

He lived for more than twenty years in Hamburg,with his partner in life and art, the Swiss painter, photographer and conceptual artist Alfred Wäspi (1943-2022), who illustrated several of his book. Hultberg died of cancer in December 2007 .

== Writings ==
Danish titles by Peer Hultberg (none are translated to English):

- Mytologisk landskab med Daphnes forvandling (novel, 1968)
- Desmond! (novel, 1968)
- Requiem (novel, 1985)(German title: Requim)
- Slagne veje (novel, 1988) (German title: Spurweiten)
- Præludier (novel, 1989)(German title: Präludien, French Title Préludes, traduction française de Terje Sinding, édit.Circé))
- Byen og verden (novel, 1992)( German Title: Die Stadt und die Welt. Roman in 100 Texten (Salzburg: Jung und Jung, 2008))
- Kronologi (novel, 1995)
- De skrøbelige (play, 1998)
- Fædra (play, 2000)
- Kunstgreb (play, 2000)
- Min verden - bogstavligt talt (biography, 2005)
- Vredens nat (novel, 2008) (German Title: Eines Nachts. Roman (Salzburg: Jung und Jung, 2007))
- Selvbiografi (2009) (German Title: Selbstbiographie.)
- Brev (2009) (German Title: Briefe.)
