= Non Serviam (poetry collection) =

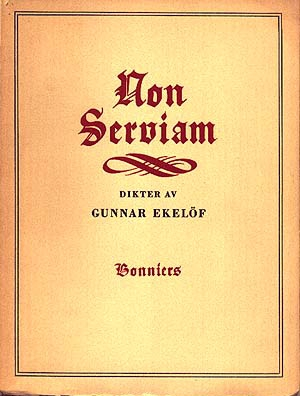
- First edition
- Author: Gunnar Ekelöf
- Language: Swedish
- Publisher: A. Bonnier
- Publication date: 1945
- Publication place: Sweden
- Pages: 98

Non Serviam is a 1945 poetry collection by the Swedish writer Gunnar Ekelöf. The title comes from the Christian phrase "Non serviam", which is Latin for "I will not serve" and is attributed to Lucifer. In the poems Ekelöf criticises the contemporary political climate of Sweden; in the titular poem he describes himself as "a stranger in this land", and in the satirical poem "Till de folkhemske" he ironizes the concept of Folkhemmet.

Non Serviam includes three of Ekelöf's greatest poems: Samothrace, Gymnosofisten (the Gymnosophist) and Absentia animi.

A sculpture by Ernst Nordin, with the name Non Serviam, stands at Malmskillnadsgatan 25 in Stockholm since 1980, and features the first four lines of Ekelöf's poem.
