= Gunnar Ekelöf =

Swedish poet and writer (1907–1968)

- Gunnar Ekelöf
- Born: Bengt Gunnar Ekelöf; 15 September 1907; Stockholm, Sweden
- Died: 16 March 1968 (aged 60); Sigtuna, Sweden
- Occupation: Poet
- Spouse(s): Gunnel Bergström (1932); Gunhild Flodquist (1942–1951); Ingrid Flodquist
- Writing career
- Period: 1932–1968
- Notable works: Non Serviam; Diwan on the Prince of Emgion
- Movements: Modernism, Surrealism

Bengt Gunnar Ekelöf (15 September 1907 – 16 March 1968) was a Swedish poet and writer. He was a member of the Swedish Academy from 1958 and was awarded an honorary doctorate in philosophy by Uppsala University in 1958. He won a number of prizes for his poetry.

== Life and works ==
=== Early life and debut ===
Gunnar Ekelöf was born on 15 September 1907 in Stockholm. He has been called Sweden's first surrealist poet. He made his debut with the collection sent på jorden ("late on earth") in 1932, written during an extended stay in Paris in 1929–1930, which was too unconventional to become widely appreciated and described by its author as capturing a period of suicidal thoughts and apocalyptic moods. It was in a sense an act of literary revolt akin to Edith Södergran's Septemberlyran of a dozen years earlier. While not disavowing his debut, Ekelöf moved towards romanticism and received better reviews for his second poetry collection, Dedikation (1934). Both the volumes are influenced by surrealism and show a violent, at times feverish torrent of images, deliberate breakdown of ordered syntax and traditional poetic language and a defiant spirit bordering on anarchism ("cut your belly cut your belly and don't think of any tomorrow" runs the black humorous refrain of a poem called "fanfare" in sent på jorden; a collection that eschews capital letters). This defiant externalism was grounded in his person. Though he came from an upper-class background, Ekelöf had never felt committed to it – his father had been mentally ill and when his mother remarried, Ekelöf strongly disapproved of his stepfather, and by extension of his mother; he had become a loner and a rebel by his teens and would never feel at ease with the mores of the established upper and middle classes or with their inhibitions and what he perceived as their hypocrisy and back-scratching. Swedish critic Anders Olsson described Ekelöf's turn to poetry as a choice of "the only utterance that doesn't expurge the contradictions and empty spaces of language and of the mind."

=== Mid-career ===
Färjesång (1941), showed influence from T.S. Eliot, whose poem East Coker Ekelöf had translated to Swedish. It took influence from oriental poetry and the darkness of the ongoing Second World War. Ekelöf himself considered Färjesång as his personal breakthrough and with its simple and effective language it has had a strong influence on later Swedish poetry.

Färjesång was followed by the acclaimed works, the prose book Promenader (1941, "Walks"), the disillusioned Non Serviam (1945) in which the title poem borrowed from Lucifer's motto "I will not serve" in Latin, which symbolises a refusal to adapt to the conformity of the welfare society, and Om hösten (1951, "In autumn") which includes the well-known poem "Röster under jorden" ("Underground voices").

In Strountes (1955), from Swedish "strunt" ("nonsense"), Ekelöf returned to his attacks on literary conventions, exploring meaninglessness. With his continual wordplay, he demonstrated that meaning can emerge from apparent nonsense. Similar themes were explored in Opus incertum (1959) och En natt i Otočac (1961). The poetry suite En Mölna-elegi. Metamorfoser (1960) features an advanced technique of allusions, in which the protagonist in a short moment experiences a long time sequence.

=== Recognition ===
In April 1958, Ekelöf was elected a member of the Swedish Academy, succeeding author Bertil Malmberg on chair 18 in December the same year. En Mölna-elegi ("A Mölna Elegy", 1960), a lengthy elegy Ekelöf had already begun composing in the 1930s, was a highly personal collection of free associations, moods and memories featuring intertextual references to Emanuel Swedenborg, Carl Michael Bellman, August Strindberg, Edith Södergran, and others. The poems deal with the Proustian theme of memory; the collection has been called Ekelöf's most Joycean work. On its publication, the book received strongly positive reviews by contemporary critics.

=== Last works ===
Ekelöf's last works, Dīwān över Fursten av Emgión (1965, ``Diwan on the Prince of Emgion``), Sagan om Fatumeh (1966, "The Tale of Fatumeh") and Vägvisare till underjorden (1967, "Guide to the Underworld") was a trilogy with Byzantine theme. The trilogy was inspired by journey to Istanbul and İzmir in 1965 that resulted in an outburst of creativity. In his diary, Ekelöf described the visit as a revelation that would change his life. Dīwān över Fursten av Emgión tells the story of the fictive Prince of Emgión who participated in the Battle of Manzikert, was captured, tortured and blinded, and then jailed in Constantinople for ten years. On his way home, the Prince is accompanied by a mysterious woman, assisting him in his blindness. For this book, Ekelöf was awarded the Nordic Council Literature Prize in 1966.

== Legacy ==
Ekelöf is remembered as one of the first surrealist poets of Sweden. He died on 16 March 1968 in Sigtuna. According to his will, his ashes were scattered in the river Pactolus (now the river Sart) in Salihli, Turkey. Ovid records the legend that King Midas divested himself of the golden touch by washing himself in that river.

On the 103rd anniversary of his birth, 40 Swedish poetry enthusiasts gathered in Salihli. Together with the deputy mayor, they honored Ekelöf's legacy in the city, which he had come to admire ardently on a visit in 1965, and had portrayed in several poems. A bust of Ekelöf by Gürdal Duyar was to have been placed there, but this was never done, and it now waits in the garden of the Swedish Embassy in Istanbul.

== Selected bibliography ==
=== In Swedish ===
- Sent på jorden "late on earth", poems (1932) (title in lower case lettering; this is retained in all reprints)
- Fransk surrealism "French Surrealism", translations (1933)
- Dedikation "Dedication", poems (1934)
- Hundra år modern fransk dikt "100 Years of Modern French Poetry", translations (1934)
- Sorgen och stjärnan "The Sorrow and the Star", poems (1936)
- Köp den blindes sång "Buy the Blind Man's Song", poems (1938)
- Färjesång "Ferry Song", poems (1941)
- Promenader "Walks", essays (1941)
- Non serviam "Non Serviam", poems (1945)
- Utflykter "Excursions", essays (1947)
- Om hösten "In Autumn", poems (1951)
- Strountes "Nonsense", poems (1955)
- Blandade kort "Shuffled Cards", essays (1957)
- Opus incertum "Opus Incertum", poems (1959)
- En Mölna-elegi "A Mölna-Elegy", poem (1960)
- Valfrändskaper "Elective Affinities", translations (1960)
- En natt i Otocac "A night in Otocac", poems (1961)
- Diwan över fursten av Emgión "Diwan on the Prince of Emgion", poems (1965)
- Sagan om Fatumeh "The Tale of Fatumeh", poems (1966)
- Vägvisare till underjorden "Guide to the Underworld", trans. Rika Lesser, poems (1967)
- Partitur "Score" (poems and drafts from his final year) (1969)
- Lägga patience "Solitaire Game", essays (1969)
- En självbiografi "An Autobiography", miscellaneous (1971)
- En röst "A Voice", sketches, diary notes, poems (1973)

A collected volume of Ekelöf's poetry, Dikter ("Poems"), was published by Mån Pocket in 1987.

=== In English ===
- Selected Poems of Gunnar Ekelöf, translated by Muriel Rukeyser and Leif Sjöberg, (New York: Twayne Publishers, 1967)
- Late Arrival on Earth: Selected Poems, translated by Robert Bly and Christina Paulston,(London: Rapp & Carroll, 1967)
- I Do Best Alone at Night, translated by Robert Bly and Christina Paulston, (Washington: The Charioteer Press, 1968)
- Selected Poems, translated by W. H. Auden and Leif Sjöberg, (New York: Pantheon Books, 1971)
- A Mölna Elegy, translated by Muriel Rukeyser and Leif Sjöberg, (Greensboro, NC: Unicorn Press, Inc., 1984)

Ekelöf made some substantial re-edits of the text and sequence of poems in later collected editions and anthologies of his work, especially relating to his 1930s books.

== Sources ==
- "Gunnar Ekelöf". Nationalencyklopedin. 2004.

Cultural offices
Preceded by Bertil Malmberg	Swedish Academy, Seat No.18; 1958–1968	Succeeded by Artur Lundkvist
