= Oranju Poika =

Lake in India

Aaranji Poika
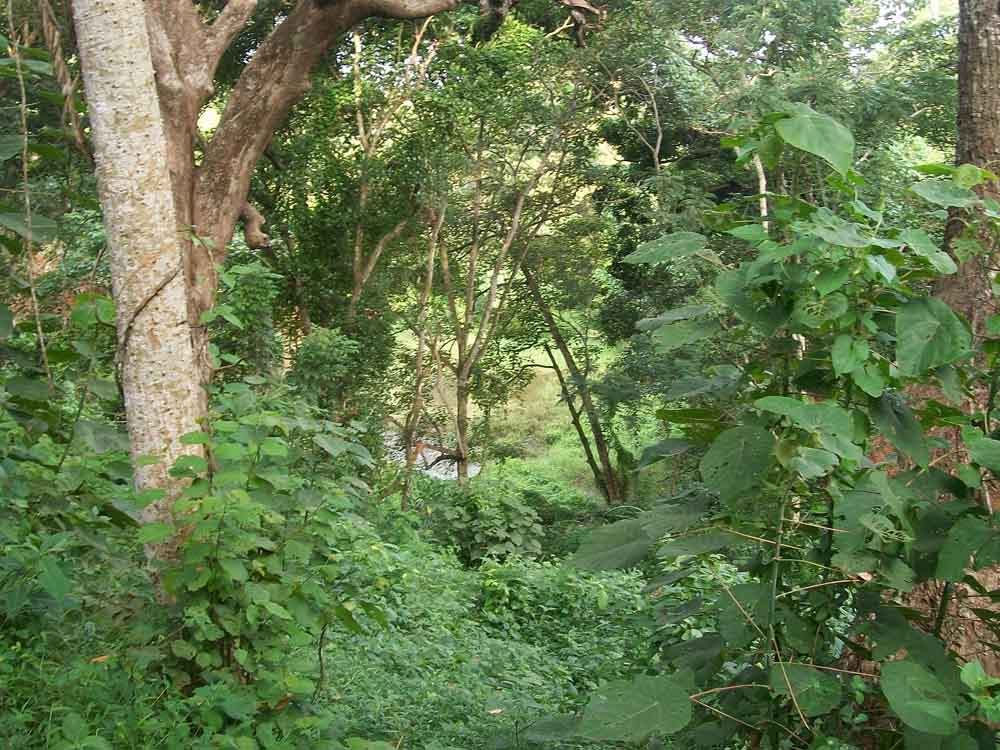
- Location: Kudappanakunnu, Thiruvananthapuram, Kerala, India
- Basin countries: India
- Surface area: Formerly more than twenty acres
- Average depth: Originally 20 to 30 feet (6 to 9 meters)
- Shore length^{1}: Forested (formerly)
- Frozen: No
- Settlements: Thiruvananthapuram
- ^{1} Shore length is not a well-defined measure.

Aaranji Poika is a landlocked natural lake formation above the montane hills of Kudappanakunnu in the middle of Thiruvananthapuram in the Indian state of Kerala.

At one time, this lake reached 20 to 30 feet in depth and its catchment area had thick forest covering more than twenty acres of land. It was a source of perennial water flow that nourished the ponds, wells and streams of surrounding areas of the hill for 5 to 10 km, reaching the majority of Thiruvananthapuram.

== Development ==
The lake is now reduced to small patches in its original bed due to the removal of the hill on the northern side to drain the lake. The lake is to be replaced with construction.

The forest on two shores and the closed campuses of organizations that came during recent years on other two sides provided cover for this destruction. An unauthorized road was constructed on the northern side to bring in machinery and remove sand and earth. Artificial tanks are to be installed for processing coir with chemicals, for establishing a waste processing unit and a plastic shredding facility.

Experts and newspaper reports opine that the deterioration of the health of the population within an 8-mile radius of the lake resulting from this pollution will be faster and more visible than at any other place. The dirt is expected to move fast through earlier natural channels under the earth that nourished the ponds, wells and streams of the region.
