= Sven Delblanc =

Swedish writer (1931–1992)

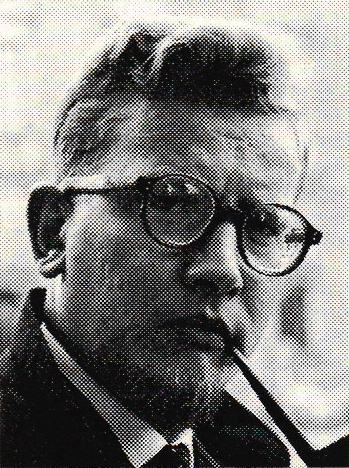
- Sven Delblanc
- Born: Sven Delblanc; 26 May 1931; Swan River, Manitoba, Canada
- Died: 15 December 1992 (aged 61); Sunnersta, Sweden
- Resting place: Hammarby kyrkogård
- Education: Uppsala University
- Occupations: associate professor of literature, academic, author, translator
- Writing career
- Period: 1962–1993
- Genres: Prose
- Notable work: Samuels bok

Sven Delblanc (May 26, 1931 – December 15, 1992) was a Swedish author and professor of literature.

== Biography ==
Born in Swan River, Manitoba, Canada, Deblanc died in Gottsunda Parish, Uppsala, and is buried in Hammarby churchyard in Uppsala, Sweden.

Delblanc was an associate professor in the history of literature at Uppsala University from 1965. He received the Aftonbladet Literature Prize in 1965. Before his death he was pointed out as the anonymous writer Bo Balderson.

He was born in Canada but grew up near Vagnhärad, Sweden. His parents divorced and the father, Siegfried Axel Herman Delblanc, remarried. His paternal grandfather, Friedrich Hermann Delblanc, a bookmaker in Stockholm, was from Leipzig, Saxony, Germany. Sven Delblanc's maternal relatives were from Väse in Värmland in the west of Sweden. His maternal grandmother came from Norway. His maternal grandfather, Axel Nordfält, was the inspiration for the character Samuel in Samuels bok (1981).

The Swedish television series Hedebyborna (1978) is based on Delblanc's series of novels Åminne (1970), Stenfågel (1973), Vinteride (1974) and Stadsporten (1976).

== Bibliography ==
- Eremitkräftan (1962)
- Prästkappan (1963)
- Homunculus (1965) (English: Homunculus: A Magic Tale)
- Ära och minne (1965)
- Nattresa (1967)
- Åsnebrygga (1969)
- Åminne (1970)
- Zahak (1971)
- Trampa vatten (1972)
- Teatern brinner (1973)
- Stenfågel (1973)
- Primavera (1973)
- Vinteride (1974)
- Kastrater (1975)
- Stadsporten (1976)
- Grottmannen (1977)
- Gunnar Emmanuel (1978)
- Gröna vintern (1978)
- Kära farmor (1979)
- Stormhatten: Tre Strindbergsstudier (1979)
- Speranza (1980) (English: Speranza)
- Samuels bok (1981)
- Samuels döttrar (1982)
- Senecas död (1982)
- Jerusalems natt (1983)
- Kanaans land (1984)
- Maria ensam (1985)
- Fågelfrö (1986)
- Moria land (1987)
- Änkan (1988)
- Damiens (1988)
- Ifigenia (1990)
- Livets ax (1991)
- Slutord (1991)
- Homerisk hemkomst: Två essäer om Iliaden och Odysséen (1992)
- Agnar (1993)

== Television ==
- 1968 – Lekar i kvinnohagen (manuscript)
- 1978 – Hedebyborna (manuscript)
- 1986 – Prästkappan (book)
- 1990 – Kära farmor (manuscript)
- 1992 – Maskeraden (manuscript)

== Theater ==
- Kastrater (1977)

== Awards and merits ==
- Aftonbladets litteraturpris (1965)
- BMF-plaketten (1970)
- Svenska Dagbladets litteraturpris (1970)
- Litteraturfrämjandets stora romanpris(1970)
- Zornpriset (1970)
- Sixten Heymans pris (1974)
- BMF-plaketten (1981)
- Nordiska rådets litteraturpris (1982) for Samuels bok
- Övralidspriset (1985)
- Pilotpriset (1986)
- Kellgrenpriset (1989)
- Augustpriset (1991) for Livets ax
- BMF-plaketten (1991)
- Gerard Bonniers pris (1992)
