= Veijo Meri =

Finnish writer

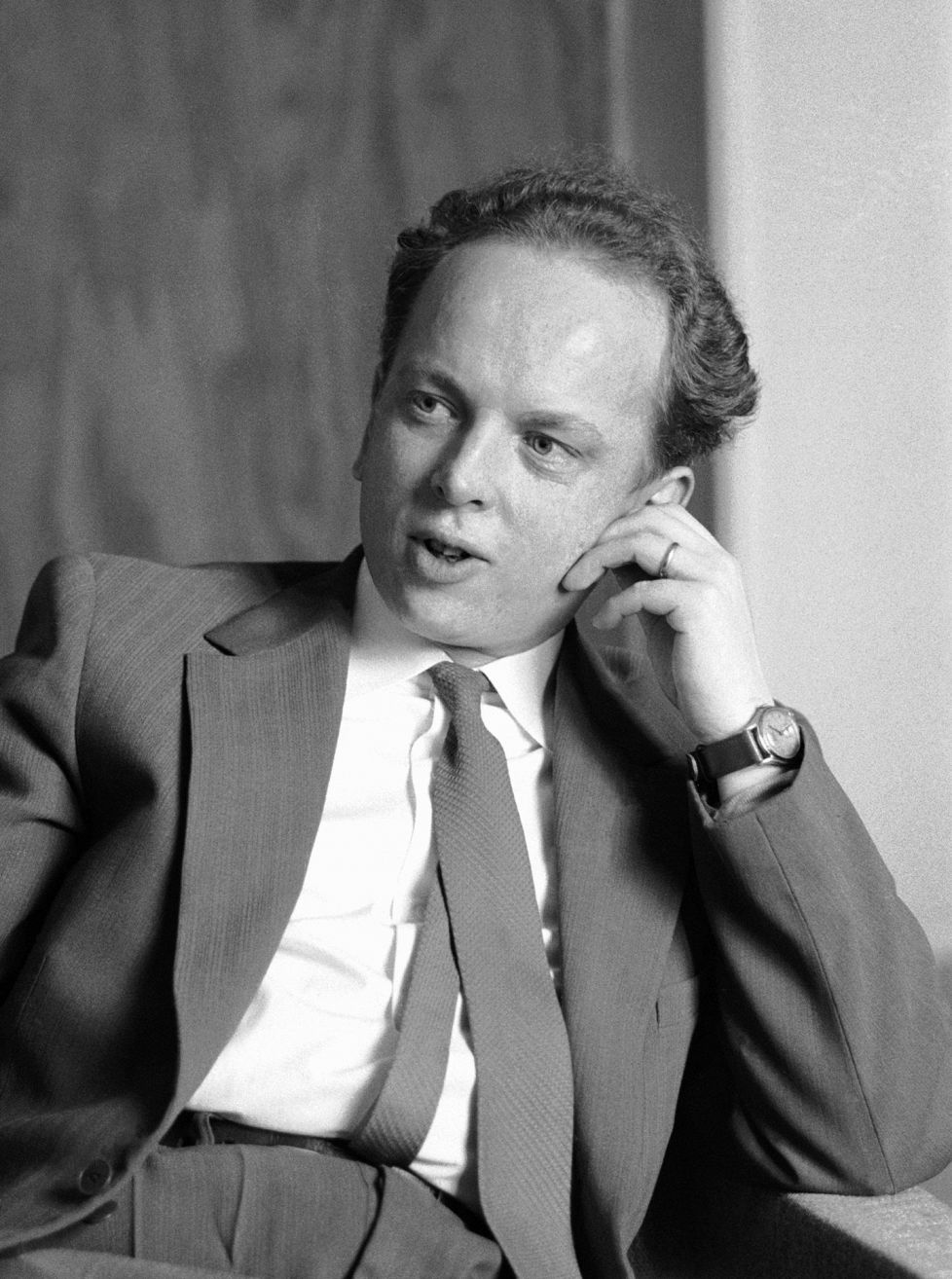
- Meri in 1960
- Born: 31 December 1928; Viipuri, Finland
- Died: 21 June 2015 (aged 86); Helsinki, Finland
- Occupation: Writer

Veijo Väinö Valvo Meri (31 December 1928 – 21 June 2015) was a Finnish writer. Much of his work focuses on war and its absurdity. The work is anti-war and has dark humor.

Born in Viipuri (today Vyborg, Russia), Meri graduated from secondary school in Hämeenlinna, then studied history and became an independent writer.

His diverse body of work includes novels, short stories, poetry, and essays.

== Translations into English ==
- Manila rope: A novel. (Translated from the Finnish by John McGahern and Annikki Laaksi.) 1967.
- Private Jokinen’s marriage leave. (Translated from the Finnish by J. R. Pitkin.) 1976.
- Beneath the Polar Star: Glimpses of Finnish History. (English translation by Philip Binham.) 1999.
