= Norwegian science fiction =

Branch of literature

Science fiction literature was established in Norway in the mid-1960s, mainly by Jon Bing and Tor Åge Bringsværd. They dominated the genre, started a society for science fiction fans, and reached relatively high public interest until the late 1970s. Johannes H. Berg Jr. is a noteworthy contributor to Norwegian science fiction literature from the 1970s until his death in 2004. Among contemporary authors is Margret Helgadottir, who writes science fiction in English.

Early science fiction can be found as far back as the 18th century in Norway. Best known is the novel Niels Klim's Underground Travels by the playwright Ludvig Holberg. Also, Henrik Wergeland wrote at least one play that can be considered science-fiction-esque: De sidste kloge ("The Last of the Wise"), set on the planet Terra Nova.

The 21st century has seen a new wave of science fiction in Norway, ranging from Øyvind Rimbereid's epic poem Solaris korrigert to Sigbjørn Skåden's Sámi science fiction story Fugl, about humans who colonise a distant planet, but in doing so, lose their language.

== Scholarship ==
- Fafnir - Nordic Journal of Science Fiction and Fantasy Research
