= Kleiva =

Kleiva is a Norwegian surname. Notable people with the surname include:

- Per Kleiva (1931–2017), Norwegian painter and graphic artist
- Rønnaug Kleiva (born 1951), Norwegian poet and short story writer
