= Will and Testament (novel) =

Novel by Vigdis Hjorth

- First edition
- Author: Vigdis Hjorth
- Original title: Arv og miljø
- Translator: Charlotte Barslund
- Language: Norwegian
- Genre: Absurdist Fiction
- Publisher: Cappelen Damm, Verso
- Publication date: September 1, 2016
- English publication date: September 10, 2019
- Media type: Print, ebook
- Pages: 330
- ISBN: 9781788733106

Will and Testament (Norwegian: Arv og miljø) is a 2016 absurdist fiction novel written by Norwegian author Vigdis Hjorth, published by Cappelen Damm. In 2019 it was translated into English by Charlotte Barslund and published by Verso Books. Will and Testament tells the story of Bergljot, a woman living with a history of sexual assault, as she gets caught up in family drama over an inheritance dispute that reignites childhood trauma. The novel received numerous awards but also received backlash for accused literary ethics violations.

== Plot ==
Will and Testament is narrated by Bergljot who recalls the events leading up to and following her father's death through sporadic flashbacks.

Bergljot is sexually assaulted and raped by her father, Bjønar, from age five to seven. Her father also physically beats Bergljot's older brother Bård. Bergljot represses these early childhood experiences. As she ages, her guilt-ridden father begins to treat her differently than his other children, and Bergljot's mother, Inga, works hard to cover up her husband's criminal actions. In her twenties, Bergljot confronts her parents about her childhood, but they deny that any abuse had taken place. Bergljot cuts off contact with her parents and the siblings who would not believe her, maintaining contact only with her brother Bård. For about twenty years, the two halves of the family exist separately.

Both Bergljot and her mother Inga have affairs with married men. Bergljot's paramour gets a divorce to have a relationship with Bergljot, although that relationship soon crumbles. Inga's paramour passes away which leads Inga to overdose and become hospitalized. Bergljot’s younger sisters, Åsa and Astrid, come to their mother's aid, while Bergljot and Bård attempt to maintain their distance. Bergljot is eventually pulled back into contact with her mother because of her medical emergency. Inga uses this as an opportunity to discuss the family inheritance with Bergljot.

It is revealed that only Åsa and Astrid will be given rights to the family cabins. Bergljot and Bård will be financially compensated, but the valuations completed on the cabins were inaccurate. Bergljot and Bård are shorted on their inheritance, and Bård takes offense. When Bård confronts the rest of the family on the will's disparities, Bergljot sides with him, vocalizing her concerns as well. The siblings exchange heated emails and text messages. Bergljot feels that her underlying conflict with her father's sexual abuse is being ignored and that her testimony is being actively suppressed by her family. Her father dies after a stroke causes him to fall down the stairs. Inga, Åsa, and Astrid are distraught, while Bergljot is relieved. The father's final will now becomes even more relevant, and arguments continue over the cabin's valuations and how the inheritance is going to be distributed. Her mother pressures Bergljot to come to a family lunch before her father's funeral. Bergljot anxiously and begrudgingly attends both events.

When the siblings and their mother meet with a financial advisor to discuss the final will, Bergljot reads an accusation of her sexual assault aloud to her family to which her family objects. Bård sides with Bergljot; the family remains divided despite Astrid's attempt to salvage their relationship. Each sibling receives an equal allotment of the family inheritance, but only Åsa and Astrid are given the cabins. Bergljot does not seek reconciliation with her family, specifically denying her mother the possibility of repaired relationship.

== Major characters ==
- Bergljot's family
  - Bergljot is a divorced theatre critic and magazine editor in Oslo, Norway. She was sexually abused and raped by her father in her early childhood. Having been estranged from her family for more than 20 years after her abuse account was rejected, she finds herself involved in an inheritance dispute between her brother, Bård, and her sisters and parents shortly before her father's death.
  - Bjørnar is Bergljot's father, whom she refers to as "Dad." He sexually abused Bergljot when she was a child, and his death at the age of 85 escalates an inheritance conflict between his children.
  - Inga is Bergljot's mother, whom she refers to as "Mum." She overdoses multiple times, and often attempts to manipulate Bergljot by yelling and crying over the phone, trying to circumvent her daughter's desire to cut off contact.
  - Bård is Bergljot's older brother. Upset to find that he had not inherited a cabin, he fights his mother and youngest sisters over his parents' will. He, like Bergljot, has put distance between himself and the rest of the family, and he believes his sister's sexual abuse story.
  - Astrid is a human rights activist and Bergljot's younger sister. She attempts to stay neutral in the matter of the sexual abuse accusations levelled against her father, refusing to fully believe either side without sufficient reason. She and Åsa are given cabins in Hvaler by their parents, inciting a dispute with Bård.
  - Åsa is Bergljot's youngest sister. She does not talk to Bergljot often. She is given a cabin, as Astrid is, taking her side in the conflict against Bård and Bergljot.
  - Ebba, Søren, and Tale are Bergljot's adult children. Of the three children, Søren knows Bergljot's siblings and parents best. Tale has two daughters, Emma and Anna, and it is she who goes with Bergljot to confront Inga, Astrid, and Åsa.
- Klara Tank is Bergljot's loyal friend, who has many troubles of her own, and advises Bergljot. Her advice often encourages Bergljot to take drastic actions, including cutting off contact with her family.
- Bo Schjerven is another friend of Bergljot's with whom she converses often. His counsel often philosophically likens the various sides of a conflict to competing parties. In particular, he tells Bergljot that her victim position and desire for vengeance would be compromised by sympathizing with both sides of the familial tensions.

== Themes ==
=== Sexual abuse allegations ===
A major element in Hjorth's novel is the idea that victims of sexual abuse should be believed. Will and Testament sets out to present the nature of such accusations honestly. Hjorth illustrates common complexities of sexual abuse allegations: the evidence is often circumstantial, and exact narration can be disordered. Nevertheless, conviction about the essential truths of the allegation stays constant. In an interview, Hjorth expressed interest in seeing how the book would be received in America, given its particular experience with the #MeToo movement.

=== Familial tension ===
Will and Testament details the fallout surrounding a sexual abuse allegation and an inheritance dispute. Throughout both subplots, there is a continuous theme of familial conflict. Mistrust, estrangement, and subsequent miscommunication between Bergljot and the rest of her family are prevalent throughout the story. The tension between Bergljot and her family is not resolved by the end of the book.

=== Psychoanalysis ===
Psychoanalysis plays a significant role in many of Hjorth's works. Hjorth uses psychoanalysis to build her characters and plots, but also invites readers to analyze the character's behavior as well as their own behavior. Numerous dreams and psychoanalyst visits are detailed in the novel. Character interactions exhibit many Freudian concepts, such as the role of childhood sexual encounters in the development of an individual's psyche. In addition, Bergljot is described as having experienced feelings of jealousy towards her mother, begrudging Inga for her married relationship with Bergljot's sexually predatory father. Hjorth describes her writing as heavily influenced by Sigmund Freud, as well as Carl Jung and Ludwig Wittgenstein, and thus she uses dream scenes to further the plot and deepen its layers of meaning.

== Structure ==
The structure of Will and Testament's English translation plays a key role in its tone and mood. Will and Testament is narrated by Bergljot in the first-person. The novel is broken into 139 sections of varying lengths with interspersed, nonlinear flashbacks from many points in Bergljot's past. The translator, Charlotte Barslund, uses erratic punctuation and comma splices to sweep the reader into the narrator's stress and anxiety. The translator's choices encourage the reader to enter Bergljot's mind and experience her flashbacks, circular thoughts, fears, new ideas, and even dreams.

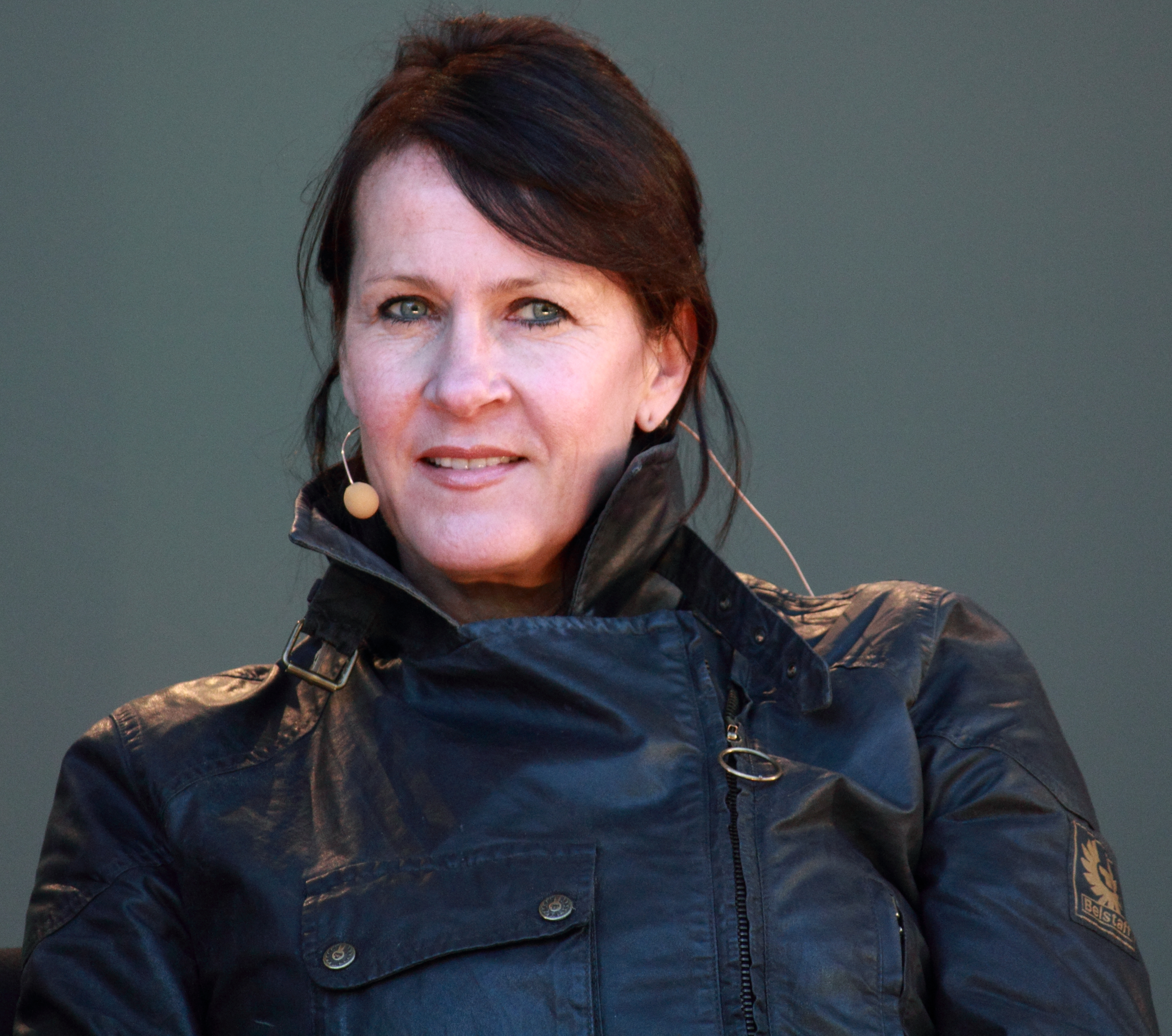
Vigdis Hjorth at the Oslo Book Festival.

== Reception ==
Speculation about the perceived autobiographical aspects of the novel sparked debates among Norwegian readers regarding the literary ethicality of its publishing. Some reviews criticize Hjorth for publicly exposing private family information without permission while some praise her for bringing this story of victimhood to light. Hjorth maintains that her novel is a work of fiction, and any specific events utilized to influence the story were agreed upon by family members. Hjorth's family publicly opposed the novel and denied its accuracy. Hjorth's sister Helga Hjorth wrote her own novel in response, titled Free Will, in 2017. The response novel tells the story of a woman surprised to find that her sister had written a fictional book inspired by familial conflict in which her character hides alleged incest. In 2019 Hjorth's mother threatened to file a lawsuit against the Den Nationale Scene for violation of privacy after the novel was adapted into play.

== Awards ==
Year	Award	Category	Result	Ref
2016	Norwegian Critics Prize for Literature	—	Won	
2017	Nordic Council Literature Prize	—	Nominated	
2019	National Book Award	Translated Literature	Longlisted	

== Adaptations ==
In 2019 Will and Testament was adapted into a staged performance that ran at the Den Nationale Scene. The play was written and directed by Kjersti Horn. The dramatization of the novel received generally positive reviews praising the cast and creative staging elements.
