= Kjersti Horn =

Norwegian theater director (born 1977)

- Born: 30 June 1977
- Known for: Theater director and storyboard writer
- Spouse: Erik Hedin

Kjersti Horn (born 30 June 1977) is a Norwegian theater director and storyboard artist, the daughter of scenographer Per Kristian Horn (born 1941) and the actor, theater director and politician for the Norwegian Labour Party (AP), Ellen Horn (b. Stoesen in 1951), partner with Sound designer and composer Erik Hedin (born 1974, two children), and half sister of Jazz singer and actor Emilie Stoesen Christensen (born 1986). She was born with the bone disease "spondylo-epyphyfyseal-dysplasi".

== Career ==
Horn is a graduate of theater directing program at Dramatiska Institutet in Stockholm 2006. During her studies she put up Nightsongs by Jon Fosse among other plays, at the Stockholm City Theatre. Horn has directed pieces like Shopping And Fucking (1998), Disco Pigs (1999), Knivskarpe polaroider (2001), and Medeas Barn (2004). She was dancing in the Jo Strømgren play Lux Aeterna (2002). She also created the storyboard for Robert Wilsons production of the play Peer Gynt (2005). In the summer 2006 she directed the Child-piece edition of Peer Gynt by Knut Nærum in Frognerparken, played by second-year students at Teaterhøgskolen in Oslo.

In January 2008, Horn directed the play Mitt navn er Rachel Corrie at Det Norske Teatret in Oslo. The play is based on the diaries of peace activist Rachel Corrie, who was killed when she stood up to stop a bulldozer from destroying a Palestinian home.

Horn directed Folkeutrydning – eller Leveren min er meningsløs, by Werner Scwab in 2008, at Den Nationale Scene in Bergen. She debuted on the Royal Dramatic Theatre in Stockholm 2008, with the critically acclaimed play Dumb Show with the well known Rein Brynjolfsson. It became so popular that it was moved to the big stage in January 2009.

The autumn 2009 she directed Valerie Solanas 7 by Sara Stridsberg on «Torshovteatret" in Oslo. The play is based on Stridsberg's award-winning novel Drømme-fakultetet, and is based on the feminist Valerie Solanas, which is known for murder attempt Andy Warhol in 1968, among other things. In January 2010, Horn directed the musical play "Spring Awakening" at Oslo Nye Teater, based on Frank Wedekind's Frühlings Erwachen (script and lyrics by Steven Sater, music by Duncan Sheik).

In January 2011 she put up the play Knutby by Malin Lagerlöf at Hålogaland Teater in Tromsø, with Anneli Drecker in a starring role. Knutby is a documentary play that analyzes the story about the Knutby murder, trying to understand the human drama underlying the story. The play is based on the true story of Knutby.

In 2019, Horn wrote and directed a play based on Vigdis Hjorth's novel Will and Testament. The novel tells the story of a woman embroiled in an inheritance dispute as she attempts to make her history of sexual abuse heard.
