= Lindboe =

Lindboe is a Norwegian surname. Notable people with the surname include:

- André Lindboe (born 1988), Norwegian handball player
- Anne Lindboe (born 1971), Norwegian politician and paediatrician
- Asbjørn Lindboe (1889–1967), Norwegian politician
- Erling Lindboe (1910–1973), Norwegian speed skater
- Einar Fr. Lindboe (1876–1953), Norwegian Nordic skier, skiing official, and surgeon
- Kaare Lindboe (1939–2021), Norwegian football referee and journalist
- Karin Kinge Lindboe (born 1947), Norwegian children's writer

== See also ==
- Vidar Lindboe-Hansen (1920–1976), Norwegian ski jumper and mining engineer
