= Ragna Thiis Stang =

Norwegian historian and museum administrator

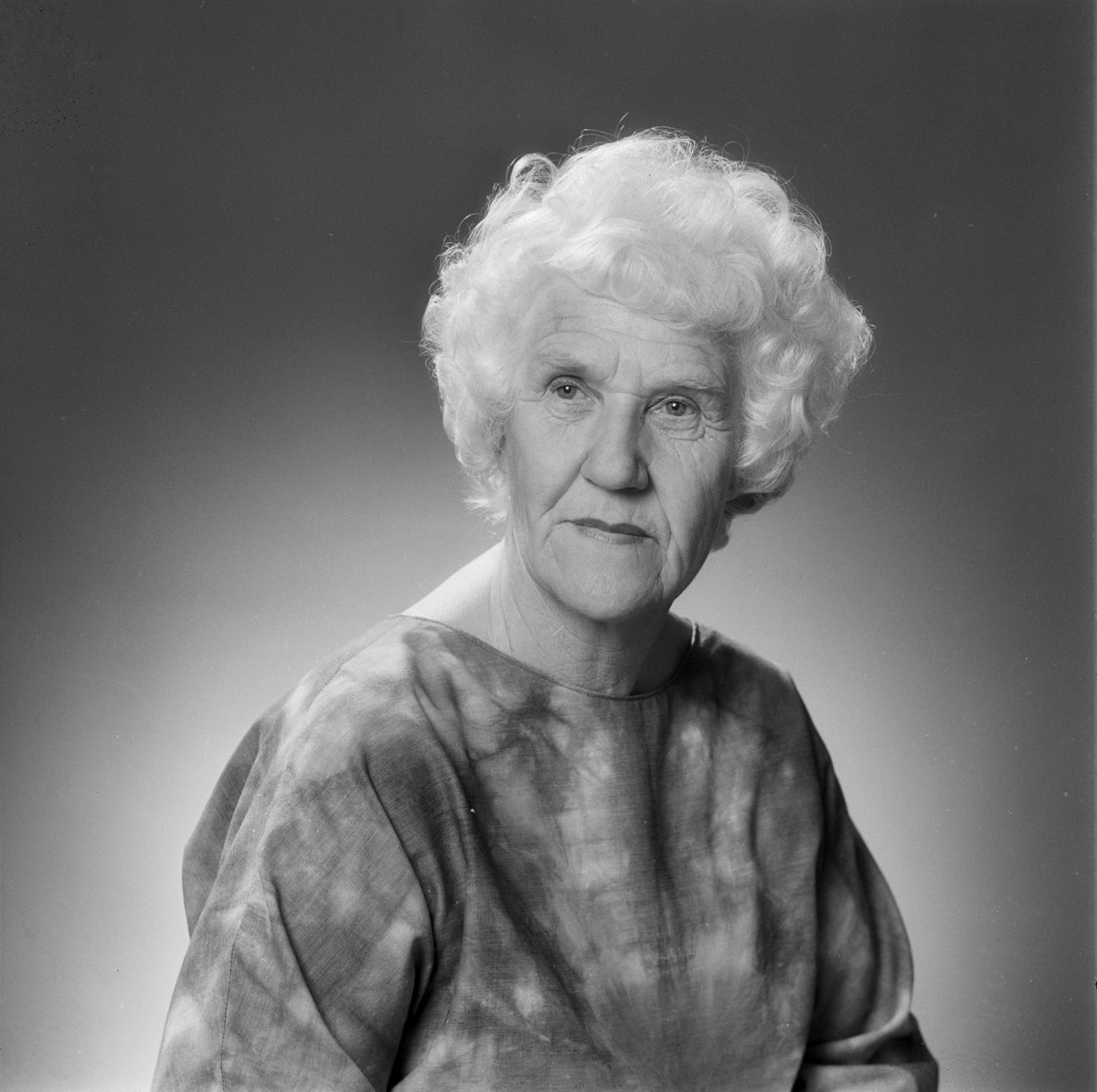
- Born: Ragna Thiis; 15 September 1909; Kristiania, Norway
- Died: 29 March 1978 (aged 68); Kenya
- Occupations: Historian; Museum administrator
- Spouse: Nic. Stang
- Children: Tove Stang Dahl; Nina Thiis Stang
- Parent: Jens Thiis
- Relatives: Helge Thiis (brother)

Ragna Thiis Stang (15 September 1909 – 29 March 1978) was a Norwegian historian and museum administrator.

== Biography ==
She was born in Kristiania (now Oslo), Norway, to museum director Jens Thiis and his wife Vilhelmine Dons. Her brother was architect Helge Thiis.

After graduating from artium in Oslo in 1929, she studied art history at the University of Oslo. She also conducted several study trips to Belgium, France, Greece and Germany. She stayed at the Swedish Archaeological Institute in Rome from 1934 to 1935. She received her master's degree in art history in 1937 and her doctorate in 1960.

Stang was appointed at the Norwegian Museum of Cultural History from 1938 to 1944. From 1947 she was manager of the Vigeland Museum at Frogner. In 1966 Stang took over as director of the Oslo City Art Collections (Oslo kommunes kunstsamlinger) and from 1968 she was responsible for the Munch Museum at Tøyen. She published a biography of Gustav Vigeland in 1965, and a biography of Edvard Munch in 1977.

== Personal life ==
In 1934, she was married to art historian Nic. Stang (1908–1971). Their daughter Tove Stang Dahl (1938–93) became a legal scholar and married historian Hans Fredrik Dahl. Their other daughter, Nina Thiis Stang (1944–78), worked for NORAD. Ragna and Nina died in a car accident on a road from Nairobi to Mombasa in Kenya on 29 March 1978.

== Selected works ==
- De store billedhuggere og borgerrepublikken Firenze (1959)
- Gustav Vigeland. En kunstner og hans verk (1965)
- Edvard Munch. Mennesket og kunstneren (1977)
