= Bastiansen =

Bastiansen is a surname. Notable people with the surname include:

- Anders Bastiansen (born 1980), Norwegian ice hockey forward player
- Henrik G. Bastiansen (born 1964), Norwegian historian
- Peter Bastiansen (politician) (1912–1995), Norwegian businessman and politician
- Peter Bastiansen (tennis) (born 1962), Danish tennis player
