= Rønnaug =

Rønnaug is a Norwegian given name. Notable people with the name include:

- Rønnaug Alten (1910–2001), Norwegian actress and stage instructor
- Rønnaug Kleiva (born 1951), Norwegian poet and short story writer
