= Norwegian Critics Prize for Literature =

Annual Norwegian literary award

The Norwegian Critics Prize for Literature (Den norske Kritikerprisen for litteratur or Kritikerprisen) is awarded by the Norwegian Literature Critics' Association (Norsk Litteraturkritikerlag) and has been awarded every year since 1950. The prize is presented to a Norwegian author for a literary work as agreed to among the members of the Norwegian Literature Critics' Association. Since 1978 the Norwegian Literature Critics' Association has also awarded a prize for the best work of children's literature. In 2003 the Critics Prize for the year's best work of translation was established, and in 2012 the Critics Prize for the year's best work of nonfiction for adults was established. For other Norwegian Critics Awards, see Norwegian Theatre Critics Award, which has been awarded every year since 1939 (except 1940–45), the Norwegian Music Critics Award, which has been awarded every year since 1947, and the Norwegian Dance Critics Award, which has been awarded every year since 1977.

== Winners of the prize for best literary work (adult) ==
A list of Critics Prizewinners is maintained on the kritikerlaget website.

Year	Author(s)	Genre	Work	Publisher
1950	Nedreaas, Torborg	collected short stories	Trylleglasset	Aschehoug, Oslo
1951	Evensmo, Sigurd	novels (trilogy)	Grenseland, Flaggermusene og Hjemover	Gyldendal Norsk Forlag, Oslo
1952	Skrede, Ragnvald	poetry	I open båt på havet	Aschehoug, Oslo
1953	Rasmussen, Egil	novel	Sonjas hjerte	Aschehoug, Oslo
1954	Holt, Kåre	novel	Mennesker ved en grense	Gyldendal Norsk Forlag, Oslo
1955	Borgen, Johan	novel	Lillelord	Gyldendal Norsk Forlag, Oslo
1956	Jonsson, Tor	collected prose	Prosa i samling	Noregs boklag, Oslo
1957	Boyson, Emil	collected poetry	Gjenkjennelse	Gyldendal Norsk Forlag, Oslo
1958	Sverdrup, Harald	poetry	Sankt Elms ild	Aschehoug, Oslo
1959	Gundersen, Gunnar Bull	novel	Martin	Aschehoug, Oslo
1960	Jacobsen, Rolf	poetry	Brev til lyset	Gyldendal Norsk Forlag, Oslo
1961	Hauge, Olav H.	poetry	På ørnetuva	Noregs boklag, Oslo
1962	Haff, Bergljot Hobæk	novel	Bålet	Gyldendal Norsk Forlag, Oslo
1963	Mehren, Stein	poetry	Mot en verden av lys	Aschehoug, Oslo
1964	Andersen, Astrid Hjertenæs	collected poetry	Frokost i det grønne	Aschehoug, Oslo
1965	Hauge, Alfred	novels (trilogy)	Cleng Peerson biographical novels	Gyldendal Norsk Forlag, Oslo
1966	Holm, Peter R.	poetry	Befrielser	Aschehoug, Oslo
1967	Tollefsen, Astrid	poetry	Hendelser	Gyldendal Norsk Forlag, Oslo
1968	Alnæs, Finn	novel	Gemini	Gyldendal Norsk Forlag, Oslo
1969	Solstad, Dag	novel	Irr! Grønt!	Aschehoug, Oslo
1970	Børli, Hans	poetry	Isfuglen	Aschehoug, Oslo
1971	Hofmo, Gunvor	poetry	Gjest på jorden	Gyldendal Norsk Forlag, Oslo
1972	Brekke, Paal	poetry	Aftenen er stille : (Aldersheim blues)	Aschehoug, Oslo
1973	Bjørneboe, Jens	novel	Stillheten : en anti-roman og absolutt siste protokoll	Gyldendal Norsk Forlag, Oslo
1974	Hoem, Edvard	novel	Kjærleikens ferjereiser	Det Norske Samlaget, Oslo
1975	Hølmebakk, Sigbjørn	novel	Karjolsteinen	Gyldendal Norsk Forlag, Oslo
1976	Sagen, Rolf	novel	Mørkets gjerninger	Gyldendal Norsk Forlag, Oslo
1977	Engelstad, Carl Fredrik	novel	Størst blant dem: Peter Havigs notater	Aschehoug, Oslo
1978	Eidem, Odd	flaneri	Cruise	Cappelen, Oslo
1979	Vik, Bjørg	short stories	En håndfull lengsel	Cappelen, Oslo
1980	Fløgstad, Kjartan	novel	Fyr og flamme: av handling	Det Norske Samlaget, Oslo
1981	Wassmo, Herbjørg	novel	Huset med den blinde glassveranda	Gyldendal Norsk Forlag, Oslo
1982	Rønning, Åge	novel	Kolbes reise	Gyldendal Norsk Forlag, Oslo
1983	Askildsen, Kjell	collected short stories	Thomas F's siste nedtegnelser til almenheten	Aschehoug, Oslo
1984	Kjærstad, Jan	novel	Homo Falsus eller Det perfekte mord	Aschehoug, Oslo
1985	Bringsværd, Tor Åge	novel	Gobi – barndommens måne	Gyldendal Norsk Forlag, Oslo
1986	Engelstad, Carl Fredrik	novel	De levendes land	Aschehoug, Oslo
1987	Pedersen, Odd Kvaal	novel	Narren og hans mester: en roman fra kunstmaler Hertervigs tid	Gyldendal Norsk Forlag, Oslo
1988	Christensen, Lars Saabye	novel	Herman	Cappelen, Oslo
1989	Jacobsen, Roy	collected short stories	Det kan komme noen	Cappelen, Oslo
1990	Haugen, Paal-Helge	poetry	Meditasjonar over Georges de La Tour	Cappelen, Oslo
1991	Askildsen, Kjell	collected short stories	Et stort øde landskap	Forlaget Oktober, Oslo
1992	Solstad, Dag	novel	Ellevte roman, bok atten	Forlaget Oktober, Oslo
1993	Lønn, Øystein	collected short stories	Thranes metode og andre noveller	Gyldendal Norsk Forlag, Oslo
1994	Schjerven, Torgeir	novel	Omvei til Venus	Gyldendal Norsk Forlag, Oslo
1995	Vaage, Lars Amund	novel	Rubato	Forlaget Oktober, Oslo
1996	Haff, Bergljot Hobæk	novel	Skammen	Gyldendal Norsk Forlag, Oslo
1997	Herbjørnsrud, Hans	collected short stories	Blinddøra	Gyldendal Norsk Forlag, Oslo
1998	Knausgård, Karl Ove	novel	Ute av verden	Tiden Norsk Forlag, Oslo
1999	Solstad, Dag	novel	T. Singer	Forlaget Oktober, Oslo
2000	Halberg, Jonny	novel	Flommen	Kolon Forlag, Oslo
2001	Hovland, Ragnar	novel	Ei vinterreise	Det Norske Samlaget, Oslo
2002	Andersen, Merete Morken	novel	Hav av tid	Gyldendal Norsk Forlag, Oslo
2003	Petterson, Per	novel	Ut og stjæle hester (Out stealing horses)	Forlaget Oktober, Oslo
2004	Rimbereid, Øyvind	poetry	SOLARIS korrigert	Gyldendal Norsk Forlag, Oslo
2005	Lund, Thure Erik	novel	Uranophilia	Aschehoug, Oslo
2006	Fløgstad, Kjartan shared with	novel	Grand Manila	Gyldendal Norsk Forlag, Oslo
2006	Marstein, Trude	novel	Gjøre godt (Doing good deeds)	Gyldendal Norsk Forlag, Oslo
2007	Tiller, Carl Frode	novel	Innsirkling	Aschehoug, Oslo
2008	Petterson, Per	novel	Jeg Forbanner Tidens Elv (I Curse the River of Time)	Forlaget Oktober, Oslo
2009	Espedal, Tomas	novel	Imot kunsten (notatbøkene)	Gyldendal Norsk Forlag
2010	Grimsrud, Beate	novel	En dåre fri	Gyldendal Norsk Forlag, Oslo
2011	Lindstrøm, Merethe	novel	Dager i stillhetens historie	Aschehoug, Oslo
2012	Hjorth, Vigdis	novel	Leve posthornet!	Cappelen Damm, Oslo
2013	Rimbereid, Øyvind	poetry	Orgelsjøen	Gyldendal Norsk Forlag, Oslo
2014	Rishøi, Ingvild H.	short stories	Vinternoveller	Gyldendal Norsk Forlag, Oslo
2015	Hansen, Inger Elisabeth	poetry	Å resirkulere lengselen, avrenning foregår	Aschehoug, Oslo
2016	Hjorth, Vigdis	novel	Arv og miljø	Cappelen Damm, Oslo
2017	Løveid, Cecilie	poetry	Vandreutstillinger	Kolon forlag, Oslo
2018	Høvring, Mona	novel	Fordi Venus passerte en alpefiol den dagen jeg blei født	Oktober, Oslo
2019	Faldbakken, Matias	novel	Vi er fem	Oktober, Oslo
2020	Brændjord, Karoline	poetry	Jeg vil våkne til verden	Kolon forlag, Oslo
2021	Fosse, Jon	novel	Eit nytt namn. Septologien VI-VII	
2022	Jung Tjønn, Brynjulf	novel	Kvit, norsk mann	
2023	Hjorth, Vigdis	novel	Gjentakelsen	
2024	Andreassen, Kyrre	novel	Ikke mennesker jeg kan regne med	
2025	Karl Ove Knausgård	novel	Jeg var lenge død	Forlaget Oktober

== Critics Prize for the year's best children's or youth's literature ==
A list of Critics Prizewinners is maintained on the kritikerlaget website.

- 1978 - Einar Økland, for Sikk sakk
- 1979 - Tormod Haugen, for Joakim
- 1980 - Torill Thorstad Hauger, for Det kom et skip til Bjørgvin i 1349
- 1981 - Arnljot Eggen, for Den lange streiken
- 1982 - Per Knutsen, for Gull og sølv
- 1983 - Johan Fredrik Grøgaard, for Jeg, Wilhelm, 13 år
- 1984 - Vigdis Hjorth, for Jørgen + Anne er sant
- 1985 - Mette and Philip Newth, for Soldreperen
- 1986 - Tor Fretheim, for Engelene stanser ved Eventyrbrua
- 1987 - Arne Ruset, for Aldri åleine
- 1988 - Mathis Mathisen, for Ismael
- 1989 - Klaus Hagerup, for Landet der tiden var borte
- 1990 - Jostein Gaarder, for Kabalmysteriet
- 1991 - Helga Gunerius Eriksen, for Finn Inga!
- 1992 - Arne Berggren, for Stillemann- historien om et drap
- 1993 - Laila Stien, for Å plukke en smørblomst
- 1994 - Unni Lindell, for Sugemerket
- 1995 - Mette Newth, for Det mørke lyset
- 1996 - Rune Belsvik, for Dustefjerten og den store vårdagen
- 1997 - Rønnaug Kleiva, for Ikkje gløym å klappe katten
- 1998 - Erlend Loe, for Kurt - Quo vadis
- 1999 - Erna Osland, for Salamanderryttaren
- 2000 - Anne Grete Hollup, for Engel
- 2001 - Rune Belsvik, for Verdas mest forelska par
- 2002 - Hilde Hagerup, for Løvetannsang
- 2003 - Oskar Stein Bjørlykke, for Kom til dammen!
- 2004 - Arnfinn Kolerud, for Den som ikkje har gøymt seg no
- 2005 - Marianne Havdal, for Når traktoren kjem ut er det vår
- 2006 - Ragnar Hovland, for Fredlaus
- 2007 - Fam Ekman, for Kall meg onkel Alf
- 2008 - Bjørn Sortland, for Alle har eit sultent hjerte
- 2009 - Maria Parr, for Tonje Glimmerdal
- 2010 - Jo Nesbø, for Doktor Proktor og verdens undergang. Kanskje.
- 2011 - Karin Kinge Lindboe, for Etterpå varer så lenge
- 2012 - Kari Stai, for Jakob og Neikob. Tjuven slår tilbake
- 2013 - Gyrid Axe Øvsteng and Per Ragnar Møkleby, for Førstemamma på Mars
- 2014 - Gro Dahle and Svein Nyhus for Akvarium
- 2015 - Øyvind Torseter for Mulegutten
- 2016 - Tyra Teodora Tronstad for Mørket kommer innenfra
- 2017 - Magnhild Winsnes for Hysj
- 2018 – Kaia Linnea Dahle Nyhus for Verden sa ja
- 2019 – Tyra Teodora Tronstad for Flaggermusmusikk
- 2020 – Ole Kristian Løyning for Min venn, Piraten
- 2021 – Hilde Hodnefjeld for Uppsa

== Critics Prize for the year's best work of translation ==
This prize was established in 2003.

- 2003 - Sverre Dahl, for Johann Wolfgang von Goethes Wilhelm Meisters læreår
- 2004 - Geir Pollen, for W.G. Sebalds Austerlitz
- 2005 - Johannes Gjerdåker, for Odar av Horats. Andre samling
- 2006 - Karin Gundersen, for Stendhals Henry Brulards liv
- 2007 - Stig Sæterbakken, for Nikanor Teratologens Eldreomsorgen i Øvre Kågedalen
- 2008 - Steinar Lone, for Mircea Cartarescus Orbitor. Venstre vinge
- 2009 - Kristina Solum, for Roberto Bolaños Ville detektiver
- 2010 - Pedro Carmona-Alvarez and Gunnar Wærness, for Verden finnes ikke på kartet. Poesi fra hele verden
- 2011 - Merete Alfsen, for A.S. Byatts Barnas bok
- 2012 - Agnes Banach, for Witold Gombrowicz’ Dagboken 1953–1958
- 2013 - Turid Farbregd, for Katja Kettus Jordmora
- 2014 - Hege Susanne Bergan for Bønn for Tsjernobyl
- 2015 - Anne Arneberg for Kaputt
- 2016 - Kristin Sørsdal for Historia om det tapte barnet
- 2017 - Øystein Vidnes for Tre kvinner
- 2018 - Gøril Eldøen for Vernon Subutex I
- 2019 - Ove Lund for Seiobo der nede
- 2020 - Gunvald Axner Ims for Felâtun Bey og Râkim Efendi
- 2021 - Astrid Nordang for Familieleksikon
- 2022 - Ingrid Haug for Hjem
- 2023 - Marit Bjerkeng for Rytterarmeen
- 2024 - Thea Selliaas Thorsen for Ovid's Metamorfoser

== Critics Prize for the year's best work of nonfiction for adults ==
This prize was established in 2012.

- 2012 - Aage Storm Borchgrevink, for En norsk tragedie. Anders Behring Breivik og veiene til Utøya
- 2013 - Alf van der Hagen, for Dag Solstad. Uskrevne memoarer
- 2014 - Tore Rem for Knut Hamsun Reisen til Hitler
- 2015 - Morten Strøksnes for Havboka
- 2016 - Marit Paasche for Hannah Ryggen. En fri.
- 2017 - Anne Bitsch, for Går du nå, er du ikke lenger min datter
- 2018 - Jan Grue, for Jeg lever et liv som ligner deres
- 2019 - Anders Johansen, for Komme til orde. Politisk kommunikasjon 1814–1913
- 2020 - Bjørn Hatterud, for Mjøsa rundt med mor
- 2021 - Liv Køltzow, Kaja Schjerven Mollerin and Hans Petter Blad, for Dagbøker i utvalg 1964–2018
- 2022 - Tore Rem, for Olav V. Ensom majestet. 1946-1991
- 2023 - Kjetil Slagstad, for Det ligger i blodet
- 2024 - Sigurd Hverven, for Hegel. En ganske enkel bok om en vanskelig filosof

== Annual Literature Critics Award ==
The prize for literature critic of the year was established in 1994. It is granted to a critic who has demonstrated excellence through review of literature or who has strengthened the discipline of criticism. The objective is to highlight critic's work and stimulate academic study in all forms of criticism.

- 1994 - Henning Hagerup
- 1995 - Atle Christiansen
- 1996 - Geir Vestad
- 1997 - Ingunn Økland
- 1998 - Tom Egil Hverven
- 1999 - Øystein Rottem
- 2000 - Nøste Kendzior
- 2001 - Kjell Olaf Jensen
- 2002 - Marta Norheim
- 2003 - Bjørn Gabrielsen
- 2004 - Ane Farsethås
- 2005 - Espen Stueland
- 2006 - Espen Søbye
- 2007 - Anne Schäffer
- 2008 - Anne Merethe K. Prinos
- 2009 - Steinar Sivertsen
- 2010 - Tor Eystein Øverås
- 2011 - Susanne Christensen
- 2012 - Kaja Schjerven Mollerin
- 2013 - Odd W. Surén
- 2014 - Bernhard Ellefsen
- 2015 - Guri Fjeldberg
- 2016 - Olaf Haagensen
- 2017 - Anne Cathrine Straume
- 2018 - Carina Elisabeth Beddari
- 2019 - Catgrine Krøger
- 2020 - Eivind Myklebust
- 2021 - Frode Helmich Pedersen
- 2022 - Bjørn Ivar Fyksen
- 2023 - Sindre Hovdenakk
- 2024 - Live Lundh
- 2025 - Kåre Bulie
