= Christian Fredrik Borchgrevink =

Norwegian physician and academic (1924–2024)

- Born: 1 September 1924; Kristiania, Norway
- Died: 13 October 2024 (aged 100); Oslo, Norway
- Education: University of Oslo
- Occupation: Physician
- Children: Aage Borchgrevink
- Parent: H. Chr. J. Borchgrevink
- Relatives: Christian Borchgrevink (grandson)
- Awards: Defence Medal 1940–1945; Order of St. Olav (1996)

Christian Fredrik Borchgrevink (1 September 1924 – 13 October 2024) was a Norwegian medical doctor, a pioneer of bringing the subjects of family medicine and public health into an academic discipline in Norway.

== Life and career ==
Born on 1 September 1924 in Kristiania to engineer Henrik Christian Juell Borchgrevink and Wilhelmine Antonette Schibbye, Borchgrevink married Louise Storm in 1951. His first marriage was dissolved in 1983, and in 1987 he married Britt Hveem. He was the father of author Aage Borchgrevink, and grandfather of footballer Christian Borchgrevink.

He graduated as cand.med. in 1951 and dr.med. in 1961. He was appointed professor at the University of Oslo from 1969 to 1994, the first professor at the Institute of Health and Society. He was decorated Knight, First Class of the Order of St. Olav in 1996.

Borchgrevink died in Oslo on 13 October 2024, at the age of 100.
