= Nic. Stang =

Norwegian art historian and philologist

- Born: Nicolay Milberg Stang; 21 April 1908; Kristiansand, Norway
- Died: 15 July 1971 (aged 63)
- Occupation: Art historian
- Spouse: Ragna Thiis Stang
- Children: Tove Stang Dahl; Nina Thiis Stang

Nicolay Milberg Stang (21 April 1908 – 15 July 1971) was a Norwegian academic art historian, classical philologist, editor and author.

== Biography ==
Nicolay Stang was born at Kristiansand in Vest-Agder County, Norway. He was the son of Johan Ludvig Heyerdahl Stang (1874–1945) and Emilie Charlotte Milberg (1876–1965). He graduated artium from the Hamar Cathedral School in 1926. He earned his cand.philol. in Latin in 1933 from the University of Oslo.

He was a lecturer in the Oslo and Tanum school systems from 1935 to 1938. He was editorial secretary of Fritt Ord from 1936 to 1937. During the occupation of Norway by Nazi Germany, Strang was arrested in November 1940 and spent 18 months in solitary confinement at Møllergata 19 in Oslo. Stang was released in April 1943 with a pledge to abstain from any illegal activities.

He worked in literary pursuits with his wife, Ragna, who managed the legacy of her deceased father, the art historian Jens Thiis. Starting in 1945, he contributed both as a columnist and critic with Arbeiderbladet. He also founded the literary magazine Vinduet and was its first editor from 1947 to 1951. He became dr.philos. in 1957 with his dissertation on Renaissance Florence (Livet og kunsten i ungrenessansens Firenze). Stang received an annual government scholarship starting from 1962.

== Personal life ==
He was married to art historian Ragna Thiis Stang (1909–78). They were the parents of legal scholar Tove Stang Dahl (1938–93), who married historian Hans Fredrik Dahl, and Nina Thiis Stang (1944–78), who worked for NORAD. His wife and daughter Nina died in a car collision on a road from Nairobi to Mombasa in Kenya on 29 March 1978.

== Selected works ==
- Italiensk renessansekunst i bilder med tekst (1944) with Ragna Stang
- Demokratisk gjenfødelse (1945)
- Tidskifte i maleri og skjønnlitteratur (1946)
- Leonardo da Vinci (1949) with Ragna Stang
- Hverdag blant italienere (1959) illustrated by Chrix Dahl
- Edvard Munch (1971) with Ragna Stang
