= Janneken Øverland =

- Born: 22 August 1946 (age 79); Stavanger, Norway
- Occupations: editor, biographer and publishing house executive

Janneken Øverland (born 22 August 1946) is a Norwegian editor, biographer and publishing house executive. She was born in Stavanger. She edited the literary magazine Vinduet from 1980 to 1984. She was co-editor of the three-volume Norsk kvinnelitteraturhistorie (1988-1990), and has written a biography on Cora Sandel. From 1997 until her retirement in 2013 she was editorial manager for the publishing house Gyldendal Norsk Forlag, responsible for translated literature.
