= Tor Fretheim =

Norwegian journalist and children's writer (1946–2018)

- Born: 13 May 1946; Asker, Norway
- Died: 9 December 2018 (aged 72)
- Occupations: Journalist and children's writer
- Awards: Norwegian Critics Prize for Best Children's Book (1986)

Tor Fretheim (13 May 1946 – 9 December 2018) was a Norwegian journalist and author of children's literature.

== Biography ==
Fretheim was born at Asker in Akershus and grew up in Sandefjord. After graduating in 1965, he began studying at the University of Oslo. He studied journalism at the Journalisthøyskolen in Oslo from 1971 to 1973 and worked in the Aftenposten from 1974 to 1986.

He made his literary debut in 1982 with Markus kjenner ikke Supermann. He received the Norwegian Critics Prize for Best Children's Book in 1986 for Englene stanser ved Eventyrbrua. In 1996, he received the "Fretheim Aschehougprisen" and in 1997 the "Kulturdepartementets litteraturpris".

Several of Fretheim's books have been translated into other languages (Swedish, Danish and German), and he himself translated a number of books into Norwegian, mainly from Swedish.
