= Vinduet =

Norwegian literary magazine (1947–2021)

- Former editors: Former editors Nic. Stang (1947–1951); Trygve Width (1952–1953); Johan Borgen (1954–1959); Mentz Schulerud (1960–1963); Brikt Jensen (1964–1969); Jan Erik Vold and Kjell Heggelund (1970–1974); Knut Faldbakken (1975–1979); Janneken Øverland (1980–1984); Jan Kjærstad (1985–1989); Halfdan W. Freihow (1990–1992); Merete Morken Andersen (1993–1997); Nikolaj Frobenius, John Erik Riley and Tor Eystein Øverås (1998–1999); Nikolaj Frobenius, John Erik Riley, Kristine Næss and Ane Farsethås (2000–2001); Janike Kampevold Larsen, Trond Haugen and Steffen R. M. Sørum (2002–2003); Janike Kampevold Larsen (2004); Henrik H. Langeland (2005–2007); Audun Vinger (2008–2014); Kaja Schjerven Mollerin (2014–)
- Categories: literature
- Publisher: Gyldendal Norsk Forlag
- Founded: 1947
- Final issue: 2021 (print)
- Country: Norway
- Based in: Oslo
- Language: Norwegian
- Website: www.vinduet.no
- ISSN: 0042-6288
- OCLC: 1607120

Vinduet (Norwegian: The Window) is an online literary magazine. It was a print publication between 1947 and 2021. Its first issue as purely an online publication was started in Autumn 2021. The magazine is based in Oslo, Norway.

== History and profile ==
Vinduet was founded in 1947 by Harald Grieg and Nic. Stang. The owner is the publishing house Gyldendal Norsk Forlag. Four paper editions were issued annually.

In the 1960s Vinduet adopted the eclectic thinking in dealing with literary work. At the end of this period it was under the influence of younger leftist intellectuals. The magazine presents fictional texts, articles about various kinds of literature, and book reviews.

== Editors-in-chief ==
Nikolaj Frobenius was the editor-in-chief of the magazine at the end of the 1990s. From 2008 to 2013 Audun Vinger served in the post, and Kaja Schjerven Mollerin took over after him. Jan Kjærstad and Preben Jordal also served as the editors-in-chief of Vinduet. As of April 2021 the editors-in-chief were Simen V. Gonsholt and Ola Innset.

== See also ==
- List of magazines in Norway
- List of literary magazines
