= Steinar Sivertsen =

- Born: 1941 (age 84–85)
- Occupations: schoolteacher, literary critic
- Awards: Dalgards kritikarpris (1984, 1987); Norwegian Critics Prize for Literature (2009)

Steinar Sivertsen (born 1941) is a Norwegian schoolteacher and literary critic. He graduated from the University of Oslo in 1971 as cand.philol. with a thesis on the poetry of Harald Sverdrup, and was appointed teacher at the Stavanger Cathedral School from 1973 to 2005.

He was a literary critic for the newspaper Rogalands Avis from 1975 to 1992, and for Stavanger Aftenblad since 1992, and has written more than 2000 critics since he started in 1975. He was awarded the Dalgards kritikarpris in 1984, and again in 1997.

He received the Norwegian Literature Critics Award for 2009.
