= Marta Norheim =

Norwegian journalist and literary critic (born 1955)

- Born: 7 December 1955 (age 70); Voss Municipality, Norway
- Education: University of Oslo
- Occupations: Journalist and literary critic
- Employer: NRK
- Awards: Norwegian Critics Prize for Literature (2002)

Marta Norheim (born 7 December 1955) is a Norwegian journalist and literary critic. She was assigned with the Norwegian Broadcasting Corporation from 1987 to 2024.

== Career ==
Born in Voss Municipality on 7 December 1955, Norheim graduated in Nordic studies from the University of Oslo in 1984. She was appointed as cultural journalist for the NRK, the Norwegian Broadcasting Corporation, in 1987, and specialized in the field of literature. She has been involved in programs such as Kritikertorget, Boktilsynet and Bok i P2.

Her books include Røff guide til samtidslitteraturen (2007), and the follow-up Oppdateringar frå lykkelandet: røff guide til samtidslitteraturen (2017).

She was awarded the Norwegian Critics Prize for Literature in 2002, as critic of the year. She received the Olav Dalgards kritikarpris in 2009, and Språkprisen in 2012, for her essays collection Friksjoner. In 2014 she was awarded Kringkastingsprisen.

In 2023, her employed NRK announced their decision to introduce the dice throw in book reviews. Norheim firmly stated that she would exempt herself from using dice throws. She eventually resigned from NRK in January 2024, only to be hired as a literary critic in Morgenbladet.
