= Oskar Stein Bjørlykke =

Norwegian poet and writer

- Born: 4 December 1939 (age 86)
- Occupations: novelist, poet, children's writer
- Writing career
- Notable work: Kom til dammen!

Oskar Stein Bjørlykke (born 4 December 1939) is a Norwegian poet, novelist and children's writer.

He made his literary debut in 1966 with the poetry collection Deg høyrer dagen til. Among his novels are Reise til september from 1968 and Dropar from 2000.

Among his children's books are Kom til dammen! from 2003, which was awarded the Critics Prize for the year's best children's or youth's literature.
