= Aage Borchgrevink =

Norwegian human rights activist, writer and literary critic

- Born: 20 October 1969 (age 56)
- Occupations: Human rights activist, writer and literary critic

Aage Storm Borchgrevink (born 20 October, 1969) is a Norwegian human rights activist, writer and literary critic. He works at the Norwegian Helsinki Committee, where he focuses on the human rights situation in Russia, Chechnya and Georgia. He has written eight fiction and non-fiction books since his debut Arkivene. He is chair of the Norwegian Non-Fiction Writers and Translators Association.

== Career ==
He was born in Oslo, and graduated in literary history at the University of Oslo. His fiction releases are the novel Arkivene from 2000 and the short story collection Folkevandringer from 2004. He has written two travelogues; Eurostories. Reiser i Øst-Europa (2003) and Den usynlige krigen. Reiser i Tsjetsjenia, Ingusjetia og Dagestan (2007). As a literary critic he publishes in Vinduet and in newspapers.

Borchgrevink has worked in the Helsinki Committee in Norway since 1993 as an adviser, mainly on human rights in Russia and other post-Soviet countries. He is also chair of the Norwegian Non-Fiction Writers and Translators Association.

== Awards ==
In 2004 he was awarded the Ossietzky Award by the Norwegian PEN for his "outstanding promotion of free speech".

In 2012 he received the Norwegian Critics Prize for Literature for his biography of terrorist Anders Behring Breivik.

In 2022 he was nominated for the Brage Prize for his book about Putin, Krigsherren i Kreml – Putin og hans tid ("The War Lord in the Kremlin – Putin and his Time").

== Bibliography ==
- 2000: Arkivene (novel) (ISBN 978-82-05-27571-3)
- 2003: Eurostories: Reiser i Øst-Europa. (short stories) (ISBN 978-82-05-31173-2)
- 2004: Folkevandringer (novellas) (ISBN 978-82-05-33215-7)
- 2007: Den usynlige krigen: Reiser i Tsjetsjenia, Ingusjetia og Dagestan (ISBN 978-82-02-24794-2)
- 2012: En norsk tragedie: Anders Behring Breivik og veiene til Utøya ["A Norwegian tragedy. Anders Behring Breivik and the roads to Utøya"] (2012)
- 2014: Forvandlinger (novellas), Tiden
- 2019: Giganten: fra Statoil til Equinor: historien om selskapet som forandret Norge, Kagge forlag, ISBN 9788248924722
- 2022: Krigsherren i Kreml – Putin og hans tid, Kagge forlag, ISBN 9788248930051
