= Merete Morken Andersen =

Norwegian writer (born 1965)

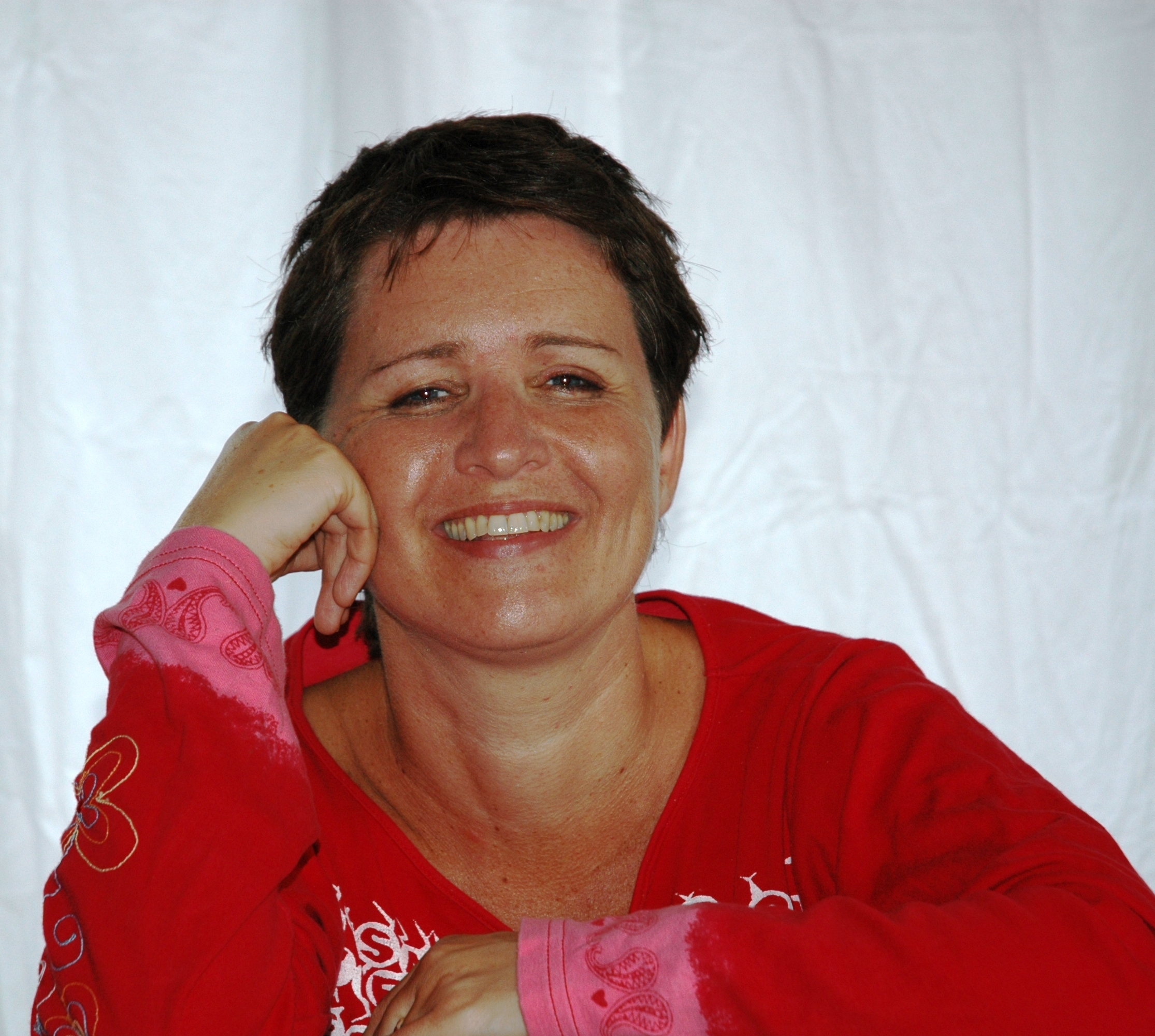
Merete Morken Andersen

Merete Morken Andersen (born 24 July 1965) is a Norwegian novelist, children's writer and magazine editor, born in Hamar. Andersen won the prestigious Norwegian Critics Prize for Literature in 2002 for Hav av tid (Oceans of Time). She was editor of the literature periodical Vinduet (Window) from 1993 through 1997. Several of her books have been translated into English

== Bibliography ==
- Fra – Novel ( 1988 )
- Broren min løper – Novel ( 1991 )
- Ibsenhåndboken – om Henrik Ibsens dramatikk – a handbook on Henrik Ibsen's drama (1995)
- Dronningen etter badet – Novel ( 1996 )
- Fiendens musikk – poetry ( 1997 )
- Livsritualer – om Cecilie Løveids – Drama ( 1998 ) Livsritualer
- Hav av tid – Novel, translated into English as Oceans of Time (2002)
- Agnes & Molly (2008)

== Prizes ==
- Norwegian Critics Prize for Literature 2002 for Hav av tid
- Amalie Skram-prisen 2003
