= Mathis Mathisen =

Norwegian writer

- Born: 4 April 1937 (age 89); Lillesand, Norway
- Occupations: Teacher; Novelist; Playwright; Children's writer
- Awards: Critics Prize for the year's best children's or youth's literature 1988

Mathis Mathisen (born 4 April 1937) is a Norwegian teacher, novelist, playwright and children's writer.

Mathisen was born in Lillesand. He made his literary debut in 1965 with the novel De blanke knappene. His play Ærefrykt for livet was staged for Fjernsynsteatret in 1969. Among his children's books are Malla from 1978, Paradisøya from 1985, and Elskede Johnny from 1991.

He was awarded the Critics Prize for the year's best children's or youth's literature in 1988.
