= Jens Thiis =

Norwegian art historian, conservator and museum director (1870–1942)

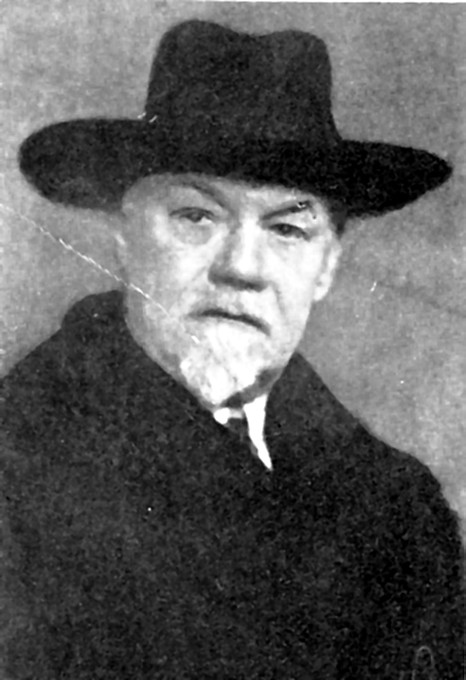
Jens Thiis (date unknown)

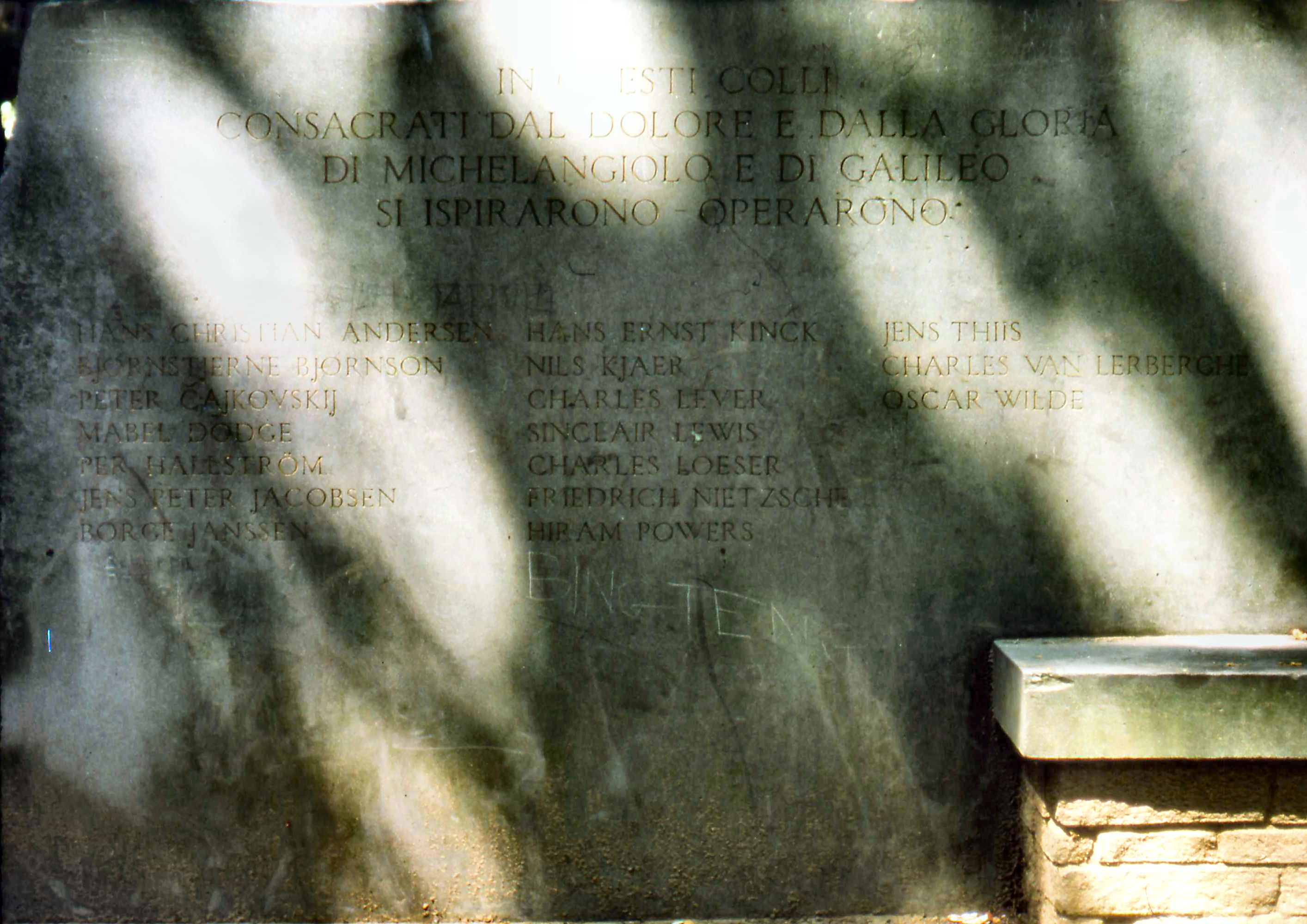
Monument to honorary citizens of Florence. Jens Thiis listed at the right side.

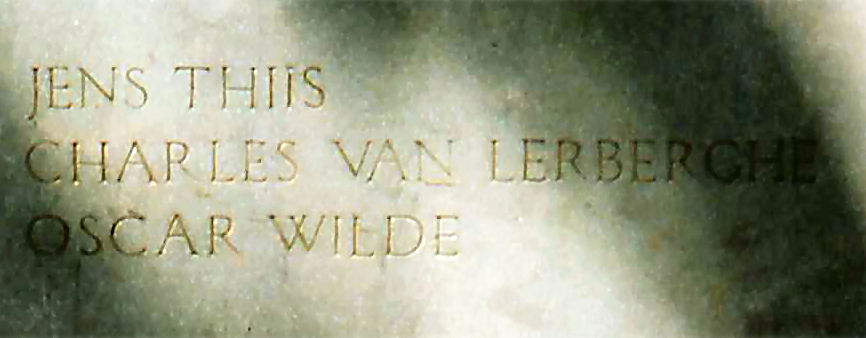
Detail of inscription

Jens Thiis (12 May 1870 – 27 June 1942) was a Norwegian art historian, conservator and a prominent museum director. He was conservator at the Nordenfjeld Industrial Arts Museum (Nordenfjeldske Kunstindustrimuseum) in Trondheim beginning in 1895 and director of the National Gallery in Oslo from 1908 to 1941.

== Biography ==
Jens Peter Thiis was born at Kongshavn in Aker, Norway. He was the son of Abraham Bøckmann Thiis (1840–90) and Emma Marie Löwegren (1842–1928). Thiis grew up with his mother's parents, goldsmith H. P. Löwegren and his wife in Kristiania (now Oslo). He graduated artium at Aars og Voss' skole in 1888. Thiis was a student at the Norwegian National Academy of Craft and Art Industry (Den kgl. Tegneskoleunder) where he trained under Christen Brun (1828-1905) and academy director Wilhelm Holter (1842-1916). He studied art history under Lorentz Dietrichson followed by study trips in Germany, Italy, Belgium and France from 1892 to 1896.

He was unusually alert to the trends of his time. In 1907, when at the Nordenfjeldske Kunstindustrimuseum in Trondheim, he engaged Henry van de Velde, now considered one of the foremost stylists of his time, to design an Art Nouveau display room and all its furniture and furnishings. The Henry van de Velde Room is unique in its kind, being specially designed for this purpose. It was later recreated on the premises of the new Nordenfjeldske Kunstindustrimuseum. As director of the National Gallery he bought French contemporary art (Monet among others) and thus made a solid base for the French collection that is now one of the gallery's main attractions.

== Personal life ==
In 1895, he married Ragna Vilhelmine Dons (1870–1939). Thiis was the father of historian Ragna Thiis Stang (1909–1978) and architect Helge Thiis (1897-1972). Jens Thiis was appointed as a knight of 1st class in the Order of St. Olav in 1911 and made commander in 1937. He held a large number of foreign orders, including the French Legion of Honour and the Order of the Polar Star and Order of Vasa. He was a member of the Norwegian Academy of Science and Letters as well as of several foreign art and science academies. He was awarded honorary citizenship of Florence for his works on the Florentine Renaissance. Thiis died during 1942 and was buried at Vestre gravlund in Oslo

== Authorship ==
- Norske malere og billedhuggere, 3 vol., 1904–07
- Monografi om Gerhard Munthe, 1904
- Norske malere og billedhuggere: en fremstilling af norsk billedkunsts historie i det 19. årh. med oversikter over samtidig fremmed kunst.
  - Vol. 1. Malerkunsten i de første 80 år. Bergen, Norway, 1904–07
  - Vol. 2. Fransk malerkunst. Norske kunstforhold. Norsk malerkunst i de sidste 25 år. Bergen, 1904–07.
  - Vol. 3. Billedhuggerne. Bergen, 1904–07.
- Leonardo da Vinci: I. Florentinertiden; Leonardo og Verrocchio; Helligtrekonger. Kra. 1909.
- Norsk malerkunst i Nationalgalleriet: halvhundrede gjengivelser av norske maleres arbeider. Mittet, 1912. - 32 p., 59 bl.
- Fransk aand og kunst.
  - Vol. 1. Fra gotik til klassicisme 1917.
  - Vol. 2. Barok og klassicisme 1917.
- Betragtninger og karakteristiker av moderne fransk maleri, nærmest i anledning av Kölnerutstillingen, Grieg, 1912. - 56 p.
- Scandinavian Art, Carl Laurin, Emil Hannover, Jens Thiis; American-Scandinavian Foundation, 1922.
- Nordisk kunst idag 1923.
- Leonardo da Vinci I. Florinertiden 1909.
- Fransk ånd og kunst, 4 vol. 1917–1939.
- Edvard Munch og hans samtid, 1933.
- Gotikkens tidsalder: de franske katedraler. Oslo, 1961 . - 30 p.
- Leonardo da Vinci Ny utg. med tillegg av senere studier ved Ragna Thiis og Nic. Stang Oslo: Gyldendal, 1949 . - XXVI s., 1 bl., 322 p.
- Essays, editor Øistein Parmann. Oslo : Dreyer, 1991. - 219 p.
- En ukjent norsk kunstsamling: J.W. Hansteens samling. Oslo: Gyldendal, 1941 . - 50 p.
- Pisanello: ungrenessansens grunnleggelse. Oslo: Gyldendal, 1941 . - 3 bl. (incl. frontb.), 107 p.
- Renoir: den franske kvinnes maler. Oslo: Gyldendal, 1940. - 4 bl., 172 p.
- Kunst, gammel og ny. Oslo : Gyldendal, 1937 . - 223 p.
- Fra Nilen til Seinen : samlede avhandlinger om fremmed kunst. Oslo: Gyldendal, 1936 . - 211 p.
- Edvard Munch og hans samtid: slekten, livet og kunsten, geniet. Oslo: Gyldendal, 1933. - 3 bl.+330 p.
- Norges billedkunst siden 1814. Medvirkende Grevenor, Henrik Langaard, Johan Henrik. Oslo : Stenersen, 1933. - 95 p.
- Norges billedkunst siden 1814. Jens Thiis, H. T. Grevenor, Johan H. Langaard. 1933. 95 pages, illustrated. Universitetets radioforedrag. Jens Thiis: Johan Christian Dahl, Edvard Munch. Henrik Grevenor:80-årene i norsk malerkunst. Johan Langaard: Norsk malerkunst efter 1900.

== Other sources ==
- Mæhle, Ole (1970) Jens Thiis, En kunstens forkjemper (Oslo: Gyldendal Norsk Forlag)
- Sommerfeldt, W.P. (1946) Museumsdirektør Jens Thiis's forfatterskap
