= Karin Kinge Lindboe =

Norwegian children's writer (born 1947)

Karin Kinge Lindboe (born 16 March 1947) is a Norwegian children's writer.

She was born in Oslo. Attending teachers' college, she also did undergraduate studies in English at the University of Bergen, and worked several years as a teacher in Oslo. She made her literary debut in 1992.

Her first book Mormors hjerte was published by Aschehoug, which remained her publisher for almost all her books, keeping a steady pace of one book each year except for 1996, 2002, 2003, 2009 and 2012 – until her last book Lucas Jackson in 2018.

Lindboe was noted for her trilogy set in the Bronze Age; Solkvinnens flamme (1998), Gaupesommer (1999) and Vinterkråke (2001). For her young adult fiction book Stella (2004) she was nominated for the Norwegian Critics Prize for Children's Literature. Lindboe later won this award for 2011's Etterpå varer så lenge, which handled loss of friends to cancer.

Most of her later books featured the characters Sam and Noa, except for Far og Sachsenhausen (2016), a novel about her father's imprisonment in Sachsenhausen concentration camp.

Awards
Preceded by Jo Nesbø	Recipient of the Norwegian Critics Prize for Children's Literature; 2011	Succeeded by Kari Stai
