= Hilde Hodnefjeld =

Norwegian illustrator and writer

- Born: 22 July 1966 (age 60); Oslo, Norway
- Education: Norwegian National Academy of Craft and Art Industry
- Occupations: Illustrator and children's writer
- Notable work: Uppsa
- Awards: Norwegian Critics Prize for Literature (2021)

Hilde Hodnefjeld (born 22 July 1966) is a Norwegian illustrator and writer of children's literature. She was awarded the Norwegian Critics Prize for Literature in 2021.

== Career ==
Born in Oslo on 22 July 1966, Hodnefjeld studied illustration at the Norwegian National Academy of Craft and Art Industry between 1988 and 1994, interrupted by studies in Paris and Iceland.

A freelance illustrator from 1994, she illustrated books with text by others. Her works include a picture book from 1999 based on a poem by Inger Hagerup, and illustrations to a book from 2010 about the artist Joseph Pujol written by Tor Edvin Dahl.

She made her debut as writer in 2009, with the children's book Kakesamleren. Further books are Hvis det ikke fantes biler from 2011, Tenk om … from 2012, and Lykke og ulykken from 2019.

Her children's book Uppsa was awarded the Norwegian Critics Prize for Literature in 2021, in the category best book for children and young adults. The book is about the feeling you get, being a little child and messing things up. Uppsa is a child of undefined age and gender, who gets pepper from dad when things break and clutter up, even though the fault is due to a gallows-bird that follows the child.
