= H. Chr. J. Borchgrevink =

Norwegian engineer & politician (1891–1967)

Henrik Christian Juell Borchgrevink (20 March 1891 – 15 June 1967) was a Norwegian engineer and politician for the Conservative Party.

He was born in Skien as a son of chief engineer Axel Juell Borchgrevink (1838–1902) and Laura Karoline Simonine Thorbjørnsen (1848–1899), and younger brother of civil servant Fredrik Grüner Borchgrevink. In 1919 he married Minnie Schibbye, a daughter of factory manager Gustav Leonard Adolf Schibbye. He was the father of physician Christian Fredrik Borchgrevink.

He finished his secondary education in 1909 and graduated in machine engineering from the Norwegian Institute of Technology in 1914. He worked various engineer jobs until 1917, when he became technical inspector in the insurance company Norske Lloyd. From 1921 he was an engineer in the company Vogt & Vogt.

He was elected to Oslo city council in 1937, and was later drafted into the executive committee. He was a board and supervisory council member of Oslo Conservative Party. He chaired Brannstyret in Oslo for twenty years until 1965, and also a board member of the Association of Norwegian Insurance Companies from 1939 to 1946, Den Norske Brand-Tarifforening, Oslo Lysverker and council member of the Norwegian Fire Protection Association.

He was decorated with the King's Medal of Merit in gold in 1965. He died in June 1967.
