= The Discoverer =

Book by Jan Kjærstad

- First edition
- Author: Henrik Nordbrandt
- Original title: Oppdageren
- Language: Norwegian
- Published: 1999
- Publisher: Aschehoug
- Publication place: Norway
- Awards: Nordic Council's Literature Prize of 2001

The Discoverer (Norwegian: Oppdageren) is a 1999 novel by Norwegian author Jan Kjærstad. It won the Nordic Council's Literature Prize in 2001.
