= Erik Hedin =

- Born: 15 September 1974 (age 50)
- Origin: Norwegian
- Genres: Sound design
- Occupation(s): Sound designer and composer

Erik Hedin (born 15 September 1974) is a sound designer and composer, and has worked closely with his partner Kjersti Horn.

== Career ==
Hedin is a graduate from the Dramatiska Institutet in Stockholm 2006, as sound designer and composer. He has contributed as sound designer and composer to a series of productions like Mitt namn er Rachel Corrie at Det Norske Teatret / Riksteatret (2008), Alfa og Omega – Edvard Munch at Oslo Nye Teater (2009), Hustyrannen at Nationaltheatret (2010), Anna Karenina at Stockholm Stadsteater (2010), Jeg var Fritz Moen (Riksteatret / Teater Manu (2010), Peer Gynt Rogaland Teater (2010) / Stavanger Symphony Orchestra / Festspillene i Bergen (2011). During the Swedish Theatre Biennial in 2009, he held the lecture "Lyddesign som scenografi."

== Honors ==
Hedin was nominated for Hedda Award 2012, in the category This year's play for Jeg var Fritz Moen as sound designer.
