= Kyrre Andreassen =

Norwegian writer and translator

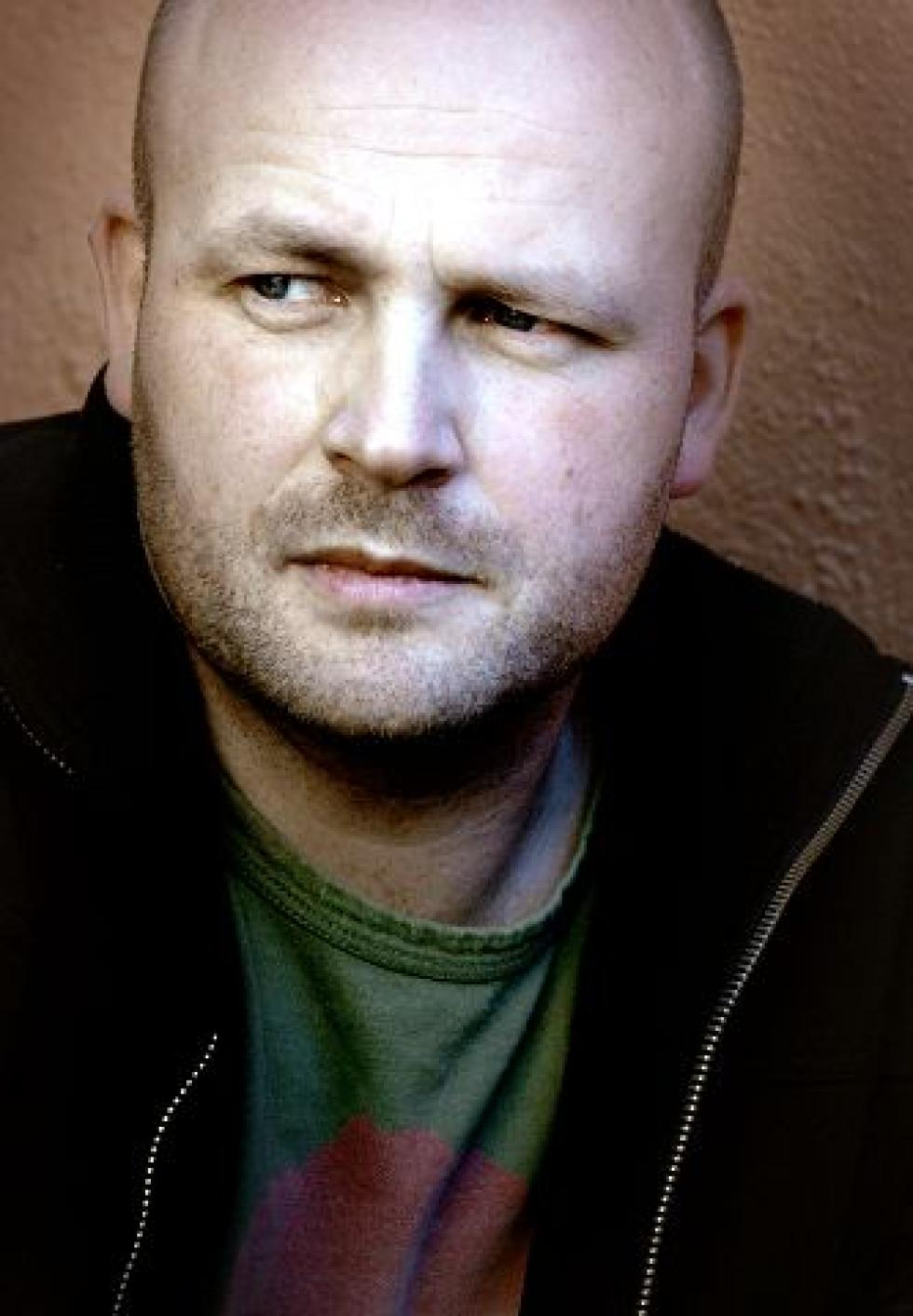
- Born: 29 September 1971 (age 54)
- Occupations: novelist, short story writer and translator
- Awards: Norwegian Critics Prize for Literature

Kyrre Andreassen (born 29 September 1971) is a Norwegian author and translator. He was awarded the Norwegian Critics Prize for Literature for 2024.

== Career ==
Born on 29 September 1971, he hails from Rødberg. Andreassen made his literary debut in 1997 with the short story collection Det er her du har venna dine. His novel Barringer came in 1999. He wrote the plays Dette stedet (2002) and Polar (2003), and the book Svendsens catering (2006). He was awarded the Sult Prize in 2007.

In 2016 he wrote the novel For øvrig mener jeg at Karthago bør ødelegges, and his novel Ikke mennesker jeg kan regne med (2024) earned him the Norwegian Critics Prize for Literature.

Andreassen has translated Danish literature into Norwegian language, including works by Jonas Eika, Theis Ørntoft and Niviaq Korneliussen.
