= Tove Stang Dahl =

Norwegian criminologist and legal scholar (1938 – 1993)

Tove Stang Dahl (born Tove Thiis Stang) (9 November 1938 – 11 February 1993) was a Norwegian legal scholar, criminologist, Professor of Law at the Faculty of Law, University of Oslo from 1988 until her death, and a pioneer of "feminist jurisprudence".

She graduated with the cand.jur. degree in 1965 and was employed at the Faculty of Law directly upon graduation, first at the Department of Criminology and Criminal Law (1965–1977) and then at the Department of Public and International Law. She was one of the founders of the field of women's law as an academic discipline at the University of Oslo in 1975, and became head of department for the new Department of Women's Law (a sub-department of the Department of Public and International Law) in 1978. In 1978, she obtained the dr.juris degree. In 1988 she was appointed by the King-in-Council as Professor of Law.

She received an honorary doctorate at the University of Copenhagen in 1986 and several other accolades. She played a central role in the establishment of the organisation Legal counselling for women and the Centre for Women's Studies at the University of Oslo, and was a member of the city council of Oslo 1967–71.

She was the daughter of art historians Nic. Stang and Ragna Thiis Stang, and was married to historian Hans Fredrik Dahl from 1960 until her death.

== Selected publications ==
- Barnevern og samfunnsvern : om stat, vitenskap og profesjoner under barnevernets oppkomst i Norge. Pax, 1978. ISBN 82-530-0893-7 (1992 ISBN 82-530-1582-8)
  - Child welfare and social defence. Universitetsforlaget, 1985 ISBN 82-00-07114-6
- «Kvinner som ofre - særlig om hustruvold» I: Nordisk tidsskrift for kriminalvidenskab; 1980:1-2
- Husmorrett : seminar i husmorrett arrangert av Norges husmorforbund i samarbeid med Avdeling for kvinnerett, 10. og 11. juni 1981. Av Tove Stang Dahl, Marianne Fastvold, Tone Sverdrup. Universitetsforlaget, 1981. ISBN 82-00-05818-2
- Kvinnerett I. Tove Stang Dahl (red.). Universitetsforlaget, 1985 ISBN 82-00-07467-6
- Kvinnerett II. Tove Stang Dahl (red.). Universitetsforlaget, 1985 ISBN 82-00-07468-4
  - Women's law : an introduction to feminist jurisprudence. Universitetsforlaget, 1987 ISBN 82-00-18490-0 (1988 ISBN 82-00-18490-0)
  - El derecho de la mujer. Madrid : Vindication feminista, 1987 ISBN 84-404-9123-9
  - Frauenrecht : eine Einführung in feministisches Recht. Bielefeld : AJZ, 1992 ISBN 3-86039-003-1
  - O direito das mulheres. Gulbenkian: Lisboa ISBN 972-31-0577-2
- Den muslimske familie : en undersøkelse av kvinners rett i islam. Universitetsforlaget, 1992 ISBN 82-00-21715-9 (2003 ISBN 82-13-02041-3)
  - The Muslim family : a study of women's rights in Islam. Scandinavian University Press, 1997 ISBN 82-00-22420-1
- Pene piker haiker ikke : artikler om kvinnerett, strafferett og velferdsstat. Universitetsforlaget, 1994 ISBN 82-00-03952-8

== Literature ==
- Annelene Svingen. Tove Stang Dahl : en annotert bibliografi over bøker og artikler: Oslo : Institutt for offentlig rett, Universitetet i Oslo, 1994 - 33 s. - (Kvinnerettslige studier; nr 34) (Institutt for offentlig retts skriftserie; nr 4/1994).
