= Kåre Bulie =

Norwegian journalist and literary critic

Kåre Huseby Bulie (born 14 August 1975) is a Norwegian journalist and literary critic.

He is a literary critic in Dagbladet since 2006. He worked in Dagens Næringsliv from 1997 to 2006, and also in VG and Morgenbladet. He has a cand.mag. degree from the University of Oslo in 2002.

He was awarded the Norwegian Critics Prize for Literature in 2025, as literary critic of the year.
