= Kristin Sørsdal =

Norwegian novelist and translator

Kristin Sørsdal (born 1966) is a Norwegian novelist and translator.

She hails from Tromøy Municipality where she attended the same primary school as Karl Ove Knausgård. She made her literary debut in 2010 with the novel Makabre bikkjer (Samlaget), followed up with Guds hund (2013) and Mare (2017).

Sørsdal is best known as the Norwegian translator of Elena Ferrante's Neapolitan Novels. Sørsdal was also the one who introduced Ferrante to a Norwegian publishing house, her own Samlaget. She was awarded the Målprisen in 2016, Storegut Award in 2017 and the Norwegian Critics' Prize for translators in 2017.
