= Henrik G. Bastiansen =

Norwegian historian (born 1964)

Henrik Grue Bastiansen (born 1964) is a Norwegian historian who specializes in media studies.

He took the doctorate at the University of Oslo in 2006, with the thesis Da avisene møtte TV. Partipressen, politikken og fjernsynet 1960-1972. He has published several books, about topics such as freedom of speech in Norway, the Norwegian press, the Norwegian Broadcasting Corporation, television documentaries and telephony, as well as general media history. Bastiansen participated in the establishment of the University of Oslo Film Society 1989. Scholarship from The Research Council of Norway 1994. Academic degrees: Cand. Mag. (1991), Cand. Philol. (1995) and Dr. art. (2006). He was a member of the jury of the Norwegian Contest for Young Scientists 2001–2013 and of the jury of the Holberg Prize School Project 2005–2011. Bastiansen was editor of book reviews in Norsk Medietidsskrift 2011–2015 and head of the jury of The Freedom of Expression Foundation's Competition for Young People 2013–2016. He was chair on scientific conferences in Copenhagen (2015), Toronto (2016) and Tampere (2017). Leader of the Norwegian Association of Media History since 2017. Professor at Faculty of Media and Journalism at Volda University College, Norway.

== Selected bibliography ==
- Bastiansen, Henrik G. (1994). LIVE FROM MOON. En casestudie i frisørenes historie. KULTs skriftserie nr. 27/Levende bilder nr.2/94 (in Norwegian). Oslo: Norges Forskningsråd. ISBN 82-12-00383-3.
- Bastiansen, Henrik G. (1996). Fra referat til reportasje: Dagsrevyen 1960-1969 (in Norwegian). Oslo: Research Council of Norway. ISBN 82-12-00704-9.
- Bastiansen, Henrik G.and Trine Syvertsen (1996). "Towards a Norwegian Television History", in Ib Bondebjerg and Francesco Bono (eds.): Television in Scandinavia. History, Politics and Aesthetics. Acamedia Research Monograph 20. Luton, UK: University of Luton Press. ISBN 1-86020-509-7.
- Bastiansen, Henrik G. (1997). "Amerikanske bombefly av typen B-52...", Vietnam i norsk fjernsyn 1963-1975, IMK-report no.30. Oslo: Department of Media and Communication, University of Oslo. ISBN 82-570-6102-6.
- Bastiansen, Henrik G.; Hans Fredrik Dahl (1999). Ytringsfriheten i Norge i det 20. århundre. NOU 1999:27 (in Norwegian). Oslo: Government Administration Services. ISBN 82-583-0498-4.
- Bastiansen, Henrik G.; Hans Fredrik Dahl (1999). Over til Oslo: NRK som monopol 1945-1981. Volume three of NRKs historie (in Norwegian). Oslo: Cappelen. ISBN 82-02-17644-1.
- Bastiansen, Henrik G.; Hans Fredrik Dahl (2000). Hvor fritt et land?: sensur og meningstvang i Norge i det 20. århundre (in Norwegian). Oslo: Cappelen. ISBN 82-02-19089-4.
- Bastiansen, Henrik G. (2001). Herom har jeg nærmere telegraferet til Kongen: telegraf og telefon i norsk politikk 1850-1940 (in Norwegian). Oslo: Norsk telemuseum. ISBN 82-91335-23-0.
- Bastiansen, Henrik G. and Øystein Meland (eds.) (2001). Fra Eidsvoll til Marienlyst. Studier i norske mediers historie fra Grunnloven til TV-alderen. Kristiansand: Høyskoleforlaget. ISBN 82-7147-209-7.
- Bastiansen, Henrik G.; Hans Fredrik Dahl (2003). Norsk mediehistorie (in Norwegian) (1 ed.). Oslo: Universitetsforlaget. ISBN 82-15-00325-7.
- Bastiansen, Henrik G. (2006). Da avisene møtte TV: partipressen, politikken og fjernsynet 1960-1972 (in Norwegian). Oslo: Unipub.
- Bastiansen, Henrik G. (2006). Det piper og synger overalt: mobiltelefonen i Norge fra idé til allemannseie (in Norwegian). Oslo: Norsk telemuseum. ISBN 82-91335-35-4.
- Bastiansen, Henrik G.; Hans Fredrik Dahl (2008). Norsk mediehistorie (in Norwegian) (2 ed.). Oslo: Universitetsforlaget. ISBN 978-82-15-01353-4.
- Bastiansen, Henrik G. (2008). "Media History and the Study of Media Systems". Media History. 14 (In: Media History, Volume 14, Number 1 April 2008 ed.). Oxfordshire, UK: Routledge/Taylor &Francis Group: 95–112. doi:10.1080/13688800701880432. ISSN 1368-8804. S2CID 144906748.
- Bastiansen, Henrik G. (2009). Lojaliteten som brast. Partipressen i Norge fra senit til fall 1945-2000 (Pressehistoriske skrifter nr. 11) (in Norwegian). Oslo: Norsk Pressehistorisk Forening. ISBN 978-82-92587-11-9.
- Bastiansen, Henrik G.; et al. (2009). Det elegante uromoment. Hans Fredrik Dahl og offentligheten. Festskrift til 70-årsdagen (in Norwegian). Oslo: Pax Forlag. ISBN 978-82-530-3261-0.
- Bastiansen, Henrik G. (2010). "Fjernsyn som vaktbikkje. Brennpunkt og den undersøkende dokumentaren i NRK", in Johann Roppen and Sigurd Allern (eds.): Journalistikkens samfunnsoppdrag (in Norwegian). Oslo: IJ-forlaget. ISBN 978-82-7147-346-4.
- Bastiansen, Henrik G. (2011). Vaktbikkjefjernsynet. Kritisk journalistikk og undersøkende dokumentar i norsk TV (in Norwegian). Oslo: IJ-forlaget. ISBN 978-82-7147-348-8.
- Bastiansen, Henrik G. (2011). "Fjernsyn som vaktbikkje. Dokument 2 og den undersøkende dokumentaren i TV2", in Nordicom Information nr. 4 2011 (in Norwegian). Gothenburg: Nordicom. ISBN 978-91-86523-32-9.
- Bastiansen, Henrik G. (2012). "Massekommunikasjon på norsk", in Kristin Skaret Orgeret (ed.):Norske medier: journalistikk, politikk og kultur (in Norwegian). Oslo: Cappelen Damm Høyskoleforlaget/IJ-forlaget. ISBN 9788276349573.
- Bastiansen, Henrik G. (2013). "Filmen i mediehistorien", in Ove Solum (ed.):Film til folket. Sensur og kinopolitikk i 100 år (in Norwegian). Oslo/Trondheim: Akademisk forlag. ISBN 978-82-321-0247-1.
- Bastiansen, Henrik G. (2014). ""Fra konflikt til konsensus? Partipressens fall og konsekvensene for journalistikken", in Pressehistorisk Tidsskrift nr. 21, 2014, page 15-45". Pressehistorisk Tidsskrift (in Norwegian). Oslo: Norsk Pressehistorisk Forening. ISSN 1891-9472.
- Bastiansen, Henrik G. and Pål Aam (eds.) (2014). Hvor går dokumentaren? Nye tendenser i film, fjernsyn og på nett (in Norwegian). Bergen: Fagbokforlaget. ISBN 978-82-321-0389-8.
- Bastiansen, Henrik G. (2014). "Fjernsyn utenfor allfarvei. Oddgeir Bruaset og utkantdokumentaren i NRK", page 141-169 in Henrik G. Bastiansen and Pål Aam (eds.): Hvor går dokumentaren? Nye tendenser i film, fjernsyn og på nett (in Norwegian). Bergen: Fagbokforlaget. ISBN 978-82-321-0389-8.
- Bastiansen, Henrik G. (2014). "Hur analyseras mediehistorien: sex böcker, sex strategier", page 87-105 in Marie Cronquist, Patrik Lundell and Pelle Snickars (eds.): Återkopplingar. Mediehistoriskt arkiv nr. 28 (in Swedish). Lund: University of Lund, Sweden. ISBN 978-91-981961-2-2.
- Bastiansen, Henrik G. (2014). "Norwegian Media and the Cold War 1945-1991", page 155-169 in Harald Hornmoen and Kristin Skare Orgeret (eds.): Defending Democracy: Nordic and Global Diversities in Media and Journalism, Special Issue Nordicom Review, Volume 35. Gothenburg, Sweden: Nordicom, University of Gothenburg. ISBN 978-91-86523-95-4.
- Bastiansen, Henrik G. (2014). ""Rethinking Mass Communications in Norway: The Neglected Power of the Centre-Left Alliance in the Early 20th Century and its Importance until the Present", page 43-63 in Ulla Carlsson (ed.): Nordicom Review, Volume 35, Number 2 November 2014". Nordicom Review. Gothenburg, Sweden: Nordicom, University of Gothenburg. ISSN 1403-1108.
- Bastiansen, Henrik G., Idar Flo and Rolf Werenskjold (eds.) (2015). "Ung medievitenskap. 12 studenter forsker på norske medier", Volda University College: digital edition. Volda: Volda University College. ISBN 978-82-7661-317-9.
- Bastiansen, Henrik G. and Rolf Werenskjold (eds.) (2015). The Nordic Media and the Cold War. Gøteborg: Nordicom/University of Gothenburg. ISBN 978-91-87957-15-4.
- Bastiansen, Henrik G. (2015). "Towards Glasnost. A Case Study of the Norwegian News Coverage of Mikhail Gorbachev as Soviet Leader in 1985", in Henrik G. Bastiansen and Rolf Werenskjold (eds.) The Nordic Media and the Cold War". Gøteborg: Nordicom/University of Gothenburg. ISBN 978-91-87957-15-4.
- Bastiansen, Henrik G. (2015). "Partipressen: en introduksjon", in Øyvind Ihlen, Eli Skogerbø and Sigurd Allern (eds.): Makt, medier og politikk. Norsk politisk kommunikasjon. Oslo: Universitetsforlaget. ISBN 978-82-15-02458-5.
- Bastiansen, Henrik G. (2015). "Alf Prøysen i norsk mediehistorie", in Hans Kristian Rustad and Anne Skaret (eds.): Alf Prøysen, kunsten og mediene. Oslo: Novus forlag. ISBN 978-82-7099-825-8.
- Bastiansen, Henrik G. (2017): "Finne, granske, skrive: Kort innføring i mediehistorisk metode", in Mediehistorisk Tidsskrift nr. 27/2017, page 125–141, Oslo: Norsk Mediehistorisk Forening
- Bastiansen, Henrik G. (2018): "Da Berlinmuren falt. En komparativ studie av presse, radio og TV i 1989", in Mediehistorisk Tidsskrift nr. 29/2018, page 35–90, Oslo: Norsk Mediehistorisk Forening
- Bastiansen, Henrik G., Martin A. Klimke and Rolf Werenskjold (eds., 2019): Media and the Cold War. Between Star Wars and Glasnost, New York: Palgrave MacMillan
- Bastiansen, Henrik G.: "Reporting Glasnost. The Changing Soviet News in a Norwegian Daily, 1985-1988", in Henrik G. Bastiansen, Martin A. KLimke and Rolf Werenskjold (eds. 2019): Media and the Cold War. Between Star Wars and Glasnost, New York: Palgrave MacMillan
