= Henrik Langeland =

Norwegian novelist

Henrik Helliesen Langeland
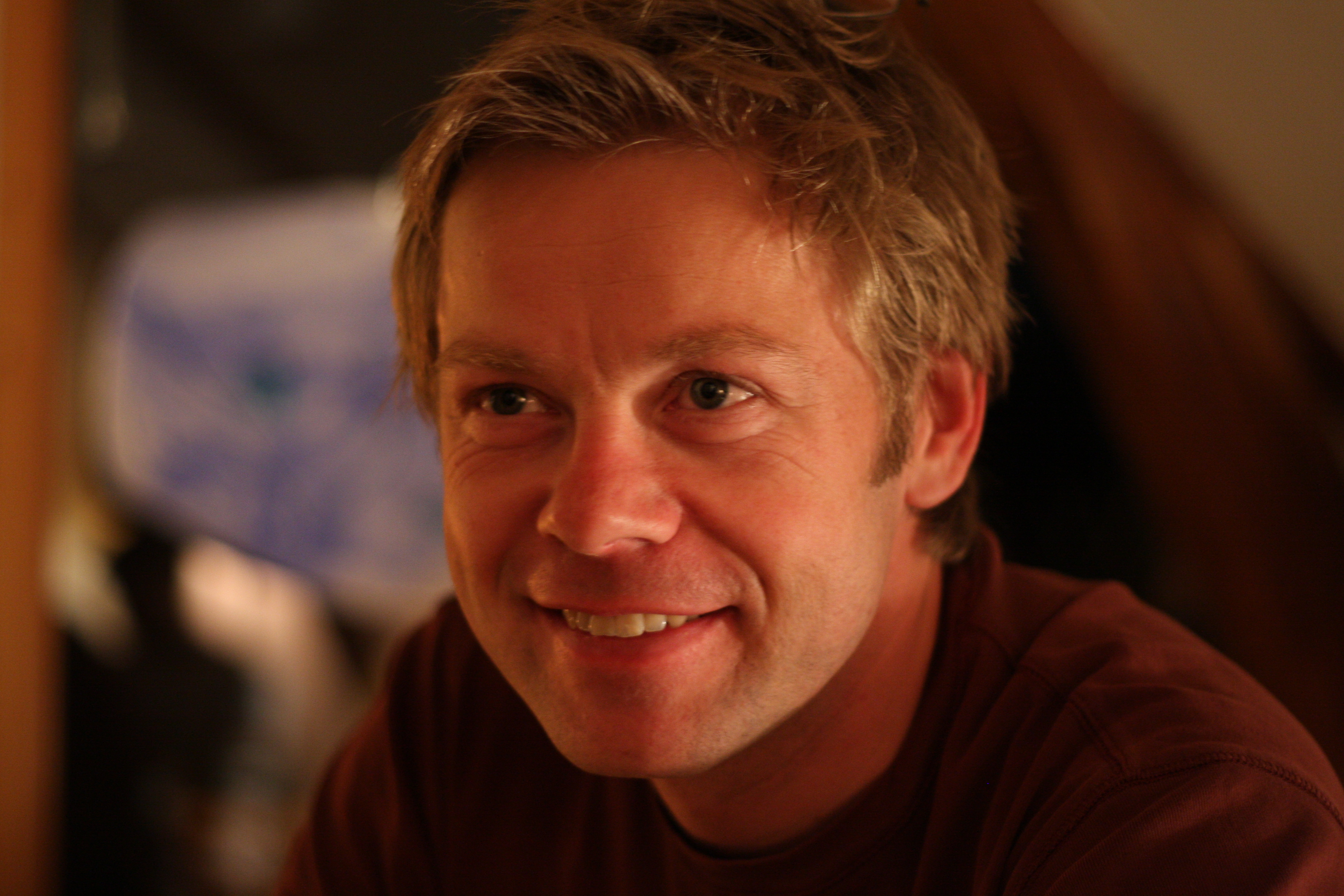
- Born: 19 November 1972 (age 53)
- Occupation: Novelist
- Writing career
- Notable works: Wonderboy (2003); Av sporet er du kommet (2006, thesis); Francis Meyers lidenskap (2007)

Henrik H. Langeland (born 19 November 1972) is a Norwegian novelist and literary researcher.

His 2000 book debut, Requiem, is based on Marcel Proust's work. He followed with Wonderboy in 2003, a satirical novel from the financial milieu. His 2007 Francis Meyers lidenskap depicts the fictitious professor of philology Francis Meyer. Wonderboy was a success in Norway, selling about 110,000 copies in its first four years. Francis Meyers lidenskap sold 51,000 copies between August and September 2007. His books have been published in seven countries.

Langeland has also worked as a management trainee in the company Schibsted. In 2005 he took over as editor-in-chief of the magazine Vinduet.

In 2005 he finished his doctor's thesis, named Av sporet er du kommet. Romlige fremstillinger hos Marcel Proust. The subtitle translates to 'Spatial Representations by Marcel Proust', and the thesis specifically concerned Proust's In Search of Lost Time.

In addition to Marcel Proust, Langeland has mentioned Cormac McCarthy, Joan Didion, Tom Wolfe, Chuck Palahniuk, David Foster Wallace and Don DeLillo as literary inspirations.

In 2008 Langeland co-released Amerikanske tilstander with John Erik Riley and Mattis Øybø, an anthology of contemporary American literature.

== Works ==
- Verdensmestrene ('The World Champions') (2010, novel)
- Hauk og due ('Hawk and Dove') (2012, novel)
- Makten og æren ('The Power and the Glory') (2024, novel)
