= Jan Kjærstad =

Norwegian author (born 1953)

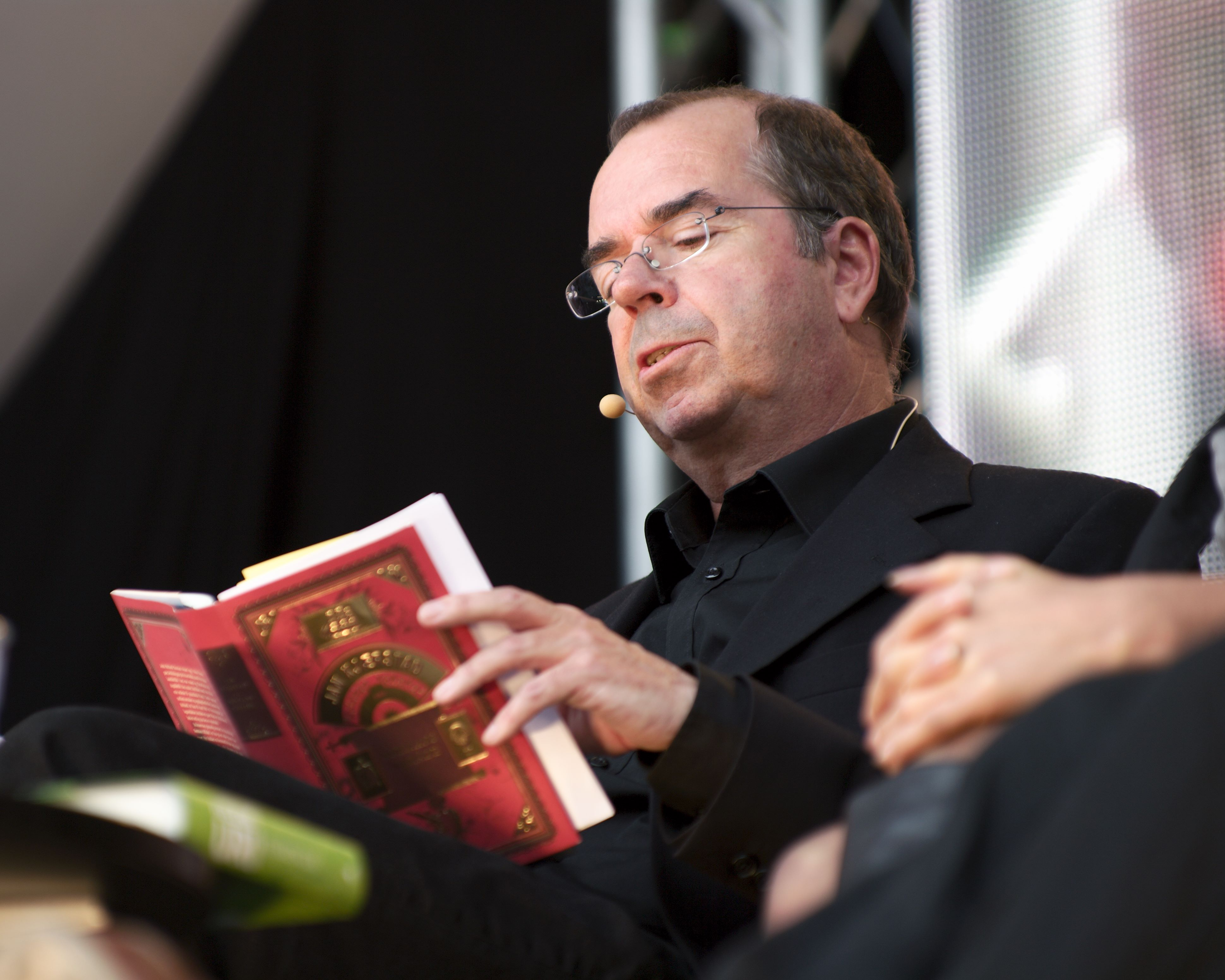
Jan Kjærstad (2011)

Jan Kjærstad (born 6 March 1953 in Oslo) is a Norwegian author. Kjærstad is a theology graduate from MF Norwegian School of Theology and the University of Oslo (cand. theol.). He has written a string of novels, short stories and essays and was editor of the literary magazine Vinduet ("The Window"). He has received a number of prizes, the most important being the Nordic Council Literature Prize, which he received for the perspectivist trilogy about the TV personality Jonas Wergeland (The Seducer, The Conqueror and The Discoverer).

With a string of ingenious novels Kjærstad is established as one of the leading and most original writers in contemporary Norwegian literature. His writing in the 1980s was postmodern works that put special emphasis on the importance of the information society. Kjærstad has often been called an encyclopedic writer. His main work, the trilogy about Jonas Wergeland, a fictive biography that tells three different versions about the protagonists life, combines several different genres.

His books have been translated to English, French, German, Danish, Swedish, and Hungarian, among others.

== Bibliography ==
- The Earth Turns Quietly ("Kloden dreier stille rundt", Short stories, 1980)
- Mirrors ("Speil", Novel, 1982)
- Homo Falsus or the Perfect Murder ("Homo Falsus eller det perfekte mord", Novel, 1984)
- The Great Fairy Tale ("Det store eventyret". Novel, 1987)
- The Matrix of Man ("Menneskets matrise", Essays, 1989)
- The Arabian Nights, vols 1 and 2 ("Tusen og én natt", Bind 1 og 2. Ed. 1989)
- The Hunt for the Hidden Waffle Hearts ("Jakten på de skjulte vaffelhjertene", Picture book, 1989)
- Brink ("Rand", Novel, 1990)
- The Seducer ("Forføreren", Novel, 1993)
- With Sheherazade, Imagination's Queen ("Hos Sheherasad, fantasiens dronning", Picture book, 1995)
- The Conqueror ("Erobreren", Novel, 1996)
- The Human Sphere ("Menneskets felt", Essays, 1997)
- The Discoverer ("Oppdageren", Novel, 1999)
- Signs for Love ("Tegn til kjærlighet", Novel, 2002)
- The King of Europe ("Kongen av Europa", Novel, 2005)
- I am the Walker brothers ("Jeg er brødrene Walker", Novel, 2008)
- The Path of Kins ("Slekters gang", Novel, 2015)
- Berge (Novel, 2017)

== Prizes and recognition ==
- 1984 – Mads Wiel Nygaards Endowment (a prize awarded to promising authors in memory of Mads Wiel Nygaard by the publisher Aschehoug)
- 1984 – Norwegian Critics Prize for Literature for Homo Falsus
- 1993 – Aschehougprisen (the primary literature prize awarded annually by the publisher Aschehoug)
- 1998 – Henrik Steffens-prisen (the Henrik Steffens literature prize is awarded by the university system in Hamburg)
- 2000 – Doblougprisen (Awarded by the Swedish Academy)
- 2001 – Nordic Council's Literature Prize for Oppdageren
