= Long Live the Post Horn! =

Novel by Vigdis Hjorth

- First edition (Norwegian)
- Author: Vigdis Hjorth
- Original title: Leve posthornet!
- Translator: Charlotte Barslund
- Genre: Novel
- Published: 2012 (Cappelen Damm); 2020 (Verso Books, English)
- ISBN: 978-1-78873-313-7

Long Live the Post Horn! (Norwegian: Leve posthornet!) is a novel by Vigdis Hjorth. Originally published in 2012, the book was translated to English by Charlotte Barslund and published by Verso Books in 2020.

== Background ==
Long Live the Post Horn! was originally written by Vigdis Hjorth after the 2011 Norway attacks. Its content was inspired in part by Søren Kierkegaard and his 1843 book Gjentagelsen, which explored the process of self-realization. The title is a reference to the brass instrument used to announce mail delivery.

=== Norwegian publication ===
The book was originally published in Norway in 2012, under the title Leve posthornet! Hjorth won a Norwegian Critics Prize for Literature for the book the same year.

=== Translations ===
The book was translated to English by Charlotte Barslund as Long Live the Post Horn!, and published by Verso Books on September 15, 2020 with 208 pages. It was additionally translated to Danish by Lene Schiøtt and published by Turbine.

== Synopsis ==
Ellinor, a 35-year-old who works for a public relations firm, is assigned to work with the postal workers' trade union on a campaign to create public opposition to Norwegian Labour Party implementation of the Third Postal Services Directive, a European Union Directive that would allow postal service privatization by introducing private competition for letters weighing under 50 grams (1.8 oz). Ellinor's colleague Dag, who was previously in charge of the contract, has recently killed himself. Initially feeling detached from the assignment and from her life in general, Ellinor becomes engaged in the effort after hearing a story about one mail carrier's effort to find the addressee of an undelivered letter.

== Reception ==
=== Norwegian publication ===
A review of Leve posthornet! in Berlingske by Jeppe Krogsgaard Christensen gave the book four out of six stars, stating that Hjorth's writing had been widely praised in her home country of Norway, and that the book had many of the same features that had made her previous writing so popular.

=== English translation ===
==== Cover ====
The cover of the Verso Books edition of Long Live the Post Horn!, which was designed by Rumors, was included on a BuzzFeed News list of "the most beautiful book covers of 2020".

==== Text ====
A review by Makenna Goodman in the Los Angeles Review of Books described Long Live the Post Horn! as "a familiar exposition of capital and commodity" but argued that "Hjorth manages to make it feel urgent in a new way". It characterized her writing style as "neat and direct, even when it becomes circuitous" and concluded that "a novel like Long Live the Post Horn! does not come around often enough."

In The New York Times Book Review, John Freeman wrote that Long Live the Post Horn! is "a brilliant study of the mundane, full of unexpected detours and driving prose" and additionally described it as the best post office novel of all time. He praised the translation by Charlotte Barslund and stated that the plot of the novel was "ingenious".

A review in Kirkus Reviews characterized Long Live the Post Horn! as "an unconvincing account of willed self-transformation", arguing that the protagonist's family and friends are not well-developed characters and stating that as the text progresses "it grows increasingly hard to care about either Ellinor or her redemption". A review in Publishers Weekly described the book as "bleak and wry", and stated that the writing style is "entertaining in small doses" but less enjoyable over the long term. It concluded that "Hjorth’s substantive and witty novel of personal growth delivers on multiple levels."

In The New Republic, Megan Evershed described Long Live the Post Horn! as an "acidic portrait" in which "Hjorth suggests that there’s an element of self-interest in even the most civic-minded endeavors". She additionally noted that the Third Postal Services Directive, which Ellinor is assigned to oppose in the book, was implemented in 2014.
