= Steinar Lone =

Norwegian translator (born 1955)

Steinar Lone (born 23 August 1955) is a Norwegian translator.

In 2009 he was awarded the Norwegian Critics Prize for Literature of 2008, for his translation of Mircea Cărtărescu's Orbitor. Aripa stângă.
