= Øyvind Rimbereid =

Norwegian author and composer

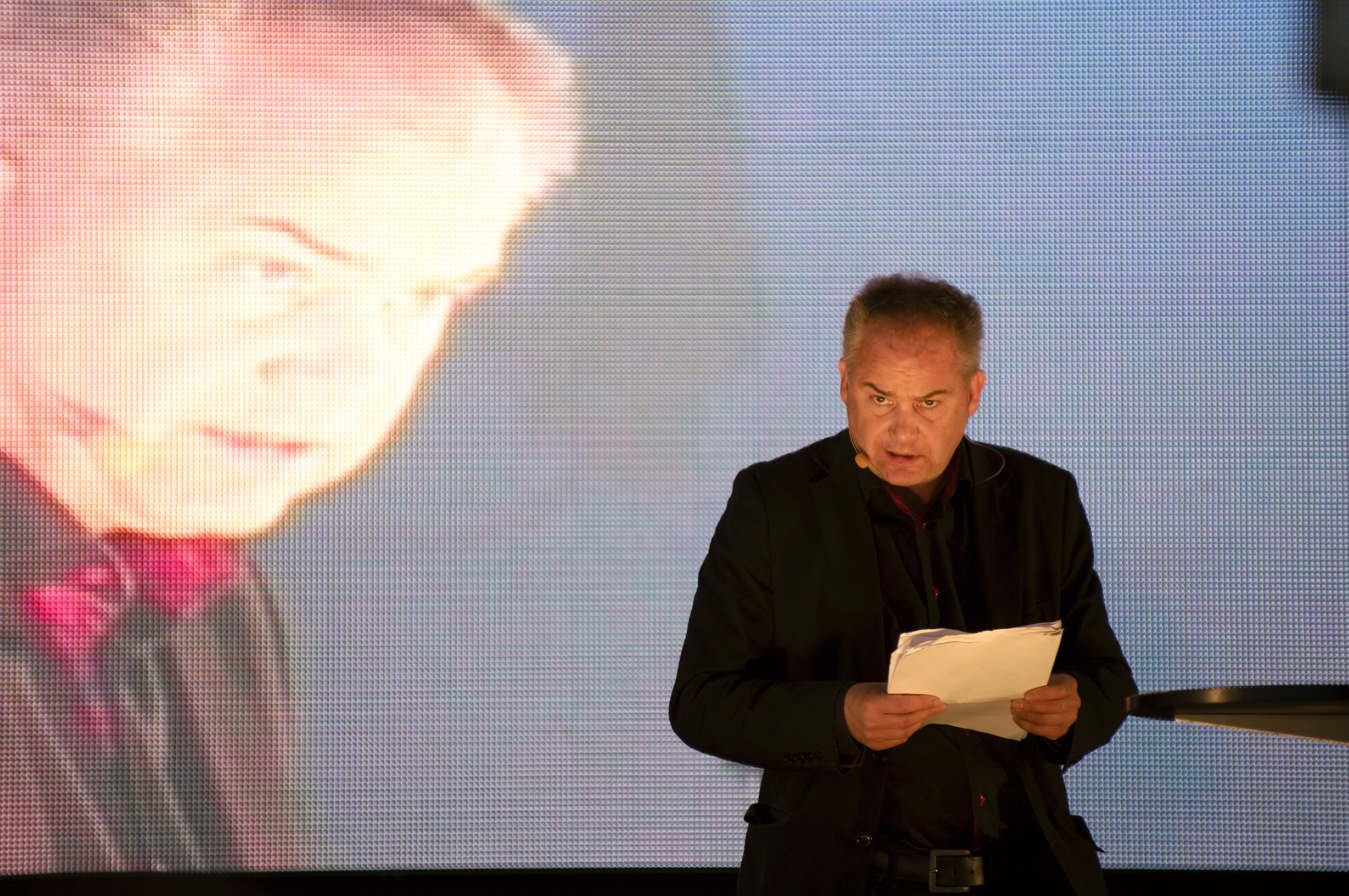
Øyvind Rimbereid Portrait

Øyvind Rimbereid (born 2 May 1966 in Stavanger) is a Norwegian author and composer of lyric poetry. He has worked as an instructor at Skrivekunstakademiet in Bergen. Rimbereid holds a cand. philol. degree from the University of Bergen with high marks in Nordic languages and literature. He won the Brage Prize 2008 for his poetry collection Herbarium.

== Bibliography ==
- Det har begynt – stories (1993)
- Som solen vokser – novel (1996)
- Kommende år – stories (1998)
- Seine topografiar – poetry (2001)
- Trådreiser – poetry (2001)
- Solaris korrigert – poetry (2004)
- Hvorfor ensomt leve, essays (2006)
- Herbarium, poetry (2008)
- Jimmen, poetry (2011)
- Orgelsjøen, poetry (2013)
- Lovene, poetry (2015)
- Lenis plassar. Et dikt, poetry (2017)
- Hvit hare, grå hare, svart, poetry (2019)

== Prizes ==
- Sult-prisen 2001
- Den norske Lyrikklubbens pris 2002
- The Norwegian Critics Prize for Literature (Kritikerprisen) 2004, for Solaris korrigert
- The Brage Prize 2008, for Herbarium
- Shortlisted for Nordic Council's Literature Prize 2009, for Herbarium
- The Norwegian Critics Prize for Literature (Kritikerprisen) 2013, for Orgelsjøen
- Aschehougprisen 2017
