= Tor Eystein Øverås =

Norwegian literary critic and essayist

Tor Eystein Øverås (born 17 July 1968) is a Norwegian literary critic and essayist. He also issued one novel.

Øverås issued the novel Tittelløs in 1993 on Gyldendal. He later issued several books on writing and literature—Fortelleren (1996), Til. En litterær reise (2005), Livet! Litteraturen! (2009), I dette landskap (2012), Hva er et essay? (2014), and Skrive, teikne, røre og slåst! (2018)—all but the last on Gyldendal.

== Award ==
In 2010 he received the Norwegian Critics Prize as literary critic of the year.
