= Solaris korrigert =

Narrative poem by Øyvind Rimbereid

Solaris korrigert (Solaris Corrected)
- by Øyvind Rimbereid
- Cover of the 1st edition.
- Original title: Solaris korrigert
- Written: 2004
- Country: Norway
- Language: A fictional future language based on Norwegian (Stavanger dialect) with English, German and old Norse mixed in
- Subject: Science fiction
- Form: Narrative
- Publisher: Gyldendal Norsk Forlag
- Publication date: 2004
- Media type: Print
- ISBN: 9788205332355
- OCLC: 1028421725

Solaris korrigert is a Norwegian narrative poem by Øyvind Rimbereid, published in 2004 in a book of poetry bearing the same title. The title can be translated into English as "Solaris Corrected", and is a reference to Stanisław Lem's novel Solaris. The poem is a 35-page narrative about a dystopic future, told in a fictional future language that is a mix of Rimbereid's Stavanger dialect, English, German and old Norse. The poem has won multiple literary awards, and has been adapted into a theatrical performance and an opera.

== Narrative ==
The poem has been described as a "dramatic monologue" with a lyrical I who is the overseer of a group of robots working on the bottom of the ocean in a future where robots have taken over much human work. The story is set in the year 2480, in "a future society owned, regulated, and controlled by what seems to be a privatized corporation".

== Language ==
The language in Solaris korrigert is its most remarkable feature. Rimbereid has created "a future language for the post-industrial North Sea coast population" that references both the hybrid language of early North Sea oil workers, the code switching of internet-using Norwegians in the early 21st century and Euro English. The language has also been compared to early twentieth century avant-garde poetry, and in particular Soviet futurists like Velimir Khlebnikov and Aleksei Kruchyonykh, who dreamt of transnationalism languages.

The opening lines demonstrate the strangeness of this constructed language:

WAT vul aig bli
om du ku kreip fra
din vorld til uss?
SKEIMFULL, aig trur, ven
du kommen vid diner imago
ovfr oren tiim, tecn, airlife,
all diner apocalyptsen
skreik-
mare. OR din beauti draum! NE

— Øyvind Rimbereid, Solaris korrigert

It is easier to understand the text when reading it aloud, or if reading it while listening to an audio recording of Rimbereid reading the first few pages of the poem.

The language has been described as "particularly fertile" because it "makes possible slack, shiftings and the occurrence of something new"

== Reception ==
Solaris korrigert has been the subject of many scholarly analyses. It is commonly found in university-level syllabi for Nordic literature and comparative literature degrees and is frequently the subject of MA theses.

Eirik Vassenden frames the poem as a critical dystopia, that is, it doesn't simply depict "a world worse than our own", which can, as Fredric Jameson has argued, make dystopias very conservative; the poem in Vassenden's words "also contains possible utopian elements". Vassenden's analysis focuses on this element of hope in the poem.

In 2007 a jury of literary critics declared it one of the 25 best Norwegian literary works of all time.

== Adaptations ==
- The Norwegian National Opera and Ballet performed an opera version of the poem titled "Ad undas – Solaris korrigert", composed by Øyvind Mæland and directed by Lisa Charlotte Baudouin Lie.
- In 2015 Det norske teatret created a performance of the play directed by Peer Perez Øian with Ane Dahl Torp as the only actor. The performance won the Hedda award for "Beste forestilling", "Beste kvinnelige skuespiller" og "Beste audiovisuell design".

== Awards ==
- Kritikerprisen (Norwegian Critics' Award) for the best adult work of literature of the year.
- 2007: a jury declared it to be among the 25 best Norwegian literary works of all time
