= Vigdis Hjorth =

Norwegian author (born 1959)

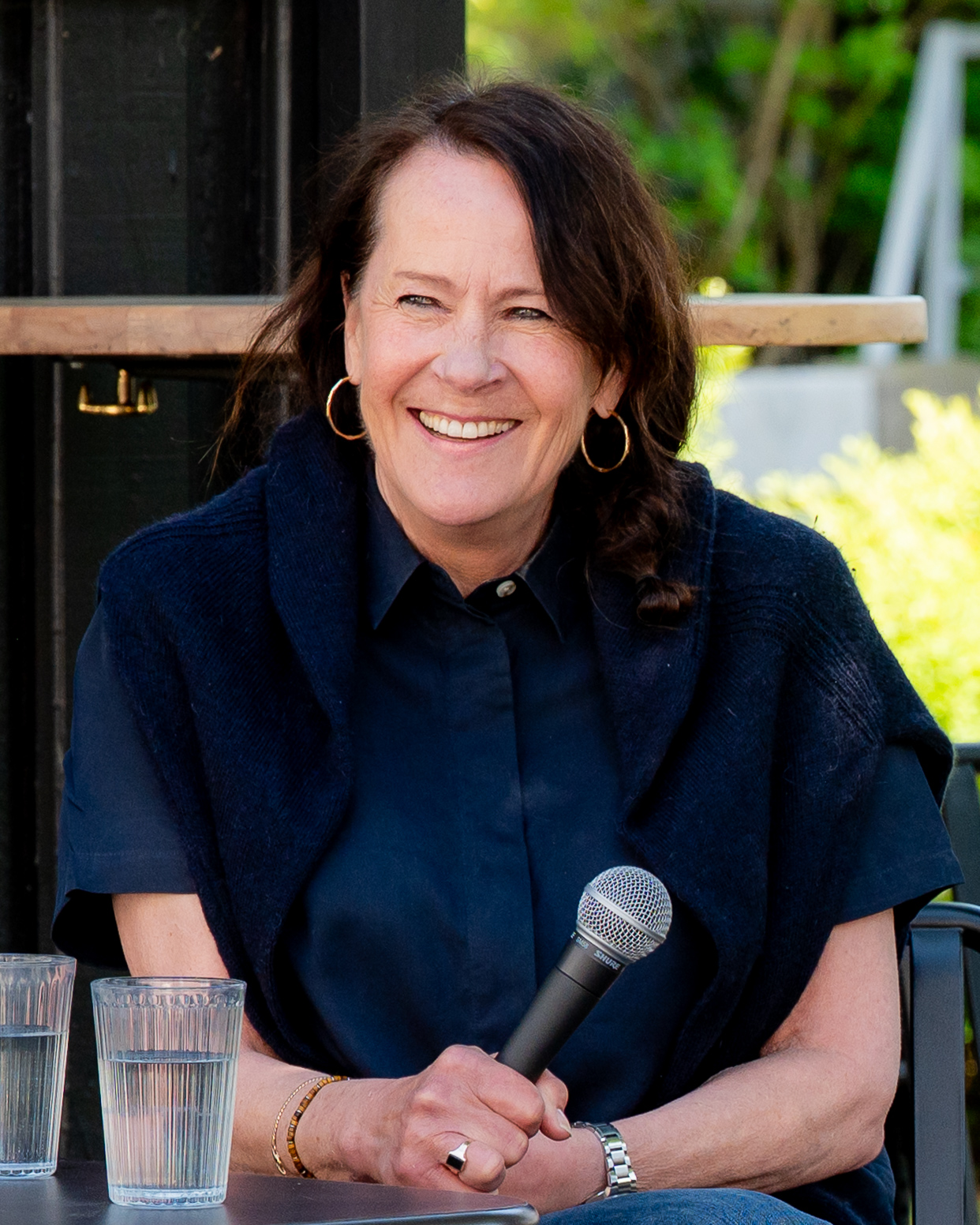
- Hjorth in 2023
- Born: 19 July 1959 (age 67); Oslo, Norway
- Occupation: Novelist
- Children: 3
- Writing career
- Language: Norwegian
- Period: 1986–present
- Genre: Literary fiction

Vigdis Hjorth (born 19 July 1959) is a Norwegian novelist whose Long Live the Post Horn (2012) and Will and Testament are the most widely known among English readers. She was longlisted for the National Book Award for Translated Literature in 2019 for Will and Testament, which had been recently translated into English. Her novel Is Mother Dead (2020), which was translated into English in 2022, was longlisted for the 2023 International Booker Prize. Her 2023 novel Gjentakelsen (Repetition) was published in March 2026.

== Life ==
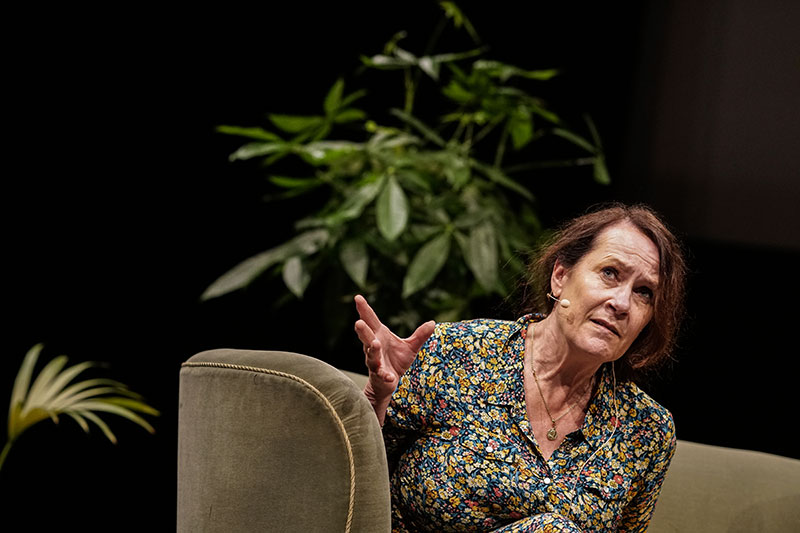
Vigdis Hjorth LiteratureXchange Aarhus 2021

Hjorth grew up in Oslo, and studied philosophy, literature and political science. In 1983, she published her first novel, the children's book Pelle-Ragnar i den gule gården, for which she received Norsk kulturråd's debut award. Her first book for an adult audience was Drama med Hilde (1987). Om bare (2001) is considered by experts as her most important novel, and a roman à clef.

Hjorth has mentioned Søren Kierkegaard, Dag Solstad, Bertolt Brecht and Louis-Ferdinand Céline as important literary influences. Hjorth has three children and lives in Asker.

== Works in English ==
- A House of Norway. Translated by Barslund, Charlotte. London: Norvik Press. 2017. ISBN 9781909408319.
- Will and Testament. Translated by Barslund, Charlotte. Verso. 2019. ISBN 9781788733106.
- Long Live the Post Horn!. Translated by Barslund, Charlotte. Verso. 2020. ISBN 9781788733137.
- Is Mother Dead?. Translated by Barslund, Charlotte. Verso. 2022. ISBN 9781839764318.
- If Only. Translated by Barslund, Charlotte. Verso. 2024. ISBN 9781839768880.
- Repetition. Translated by Barslund, Charlotte. Verso. 2026. ISBN 9781804298947.

== Selected bibliography ==
Originally in Norwegian, except when otherwise noted.

- Gjennom skogen [Through the Forest]. 1986.
- Med hånden på hjertet [Cross My Heart]. 1989.
- Fransk åpning [French Opening]. 1992.
- Død sheriff [Dead Sheriff]. 1995.
- Vigdis Jjorth; Arild Linneberg (1995). Ubehaget i kulturen [The Cultural Malaise].
- Takk, ganske bra [Very Nicely, Thank You]. 1998.
- En erotisk forfatters bekjennelser [An Erotic Author's Confessions]. 1999.
- Hva er det med mor [What's Wrong with Mother]. 2000.
- Om bare [If Only]. 2001.
- Fordeler og ulemper ved å være til [The Pros and Cons of Being Alive]. 2005.
- Hjulskift [Wheel Change]. 2006.
- Tredje person entall [Third Person Singular]. 2008.
- Snakk til meg [Talk to Me]. 2010.
- Leve posthornet! [Long Live the Post Horn!]. 2012.
- Et norsk hus [A Norwegian House]. 2015.
- Arv og miljø [Will and Testament]. 2016.
- Lærerinnens sang [The Teacher's Song]. 2018.
- Henrik Falk. 2019.
- Er mor død [Is Mother Dead?]. 2020.
- Gjentakelsen [Repetition]. 2023.

Awards
Preceded by Ingvar Ambjørnsen	Recipient of the Cappelen Prize; 1989	Succeeded by Kjell Arild Pollestad; Hans-Wilhelm Steinfeld
