= Kari Stai =

Norwegian writer and illustrator

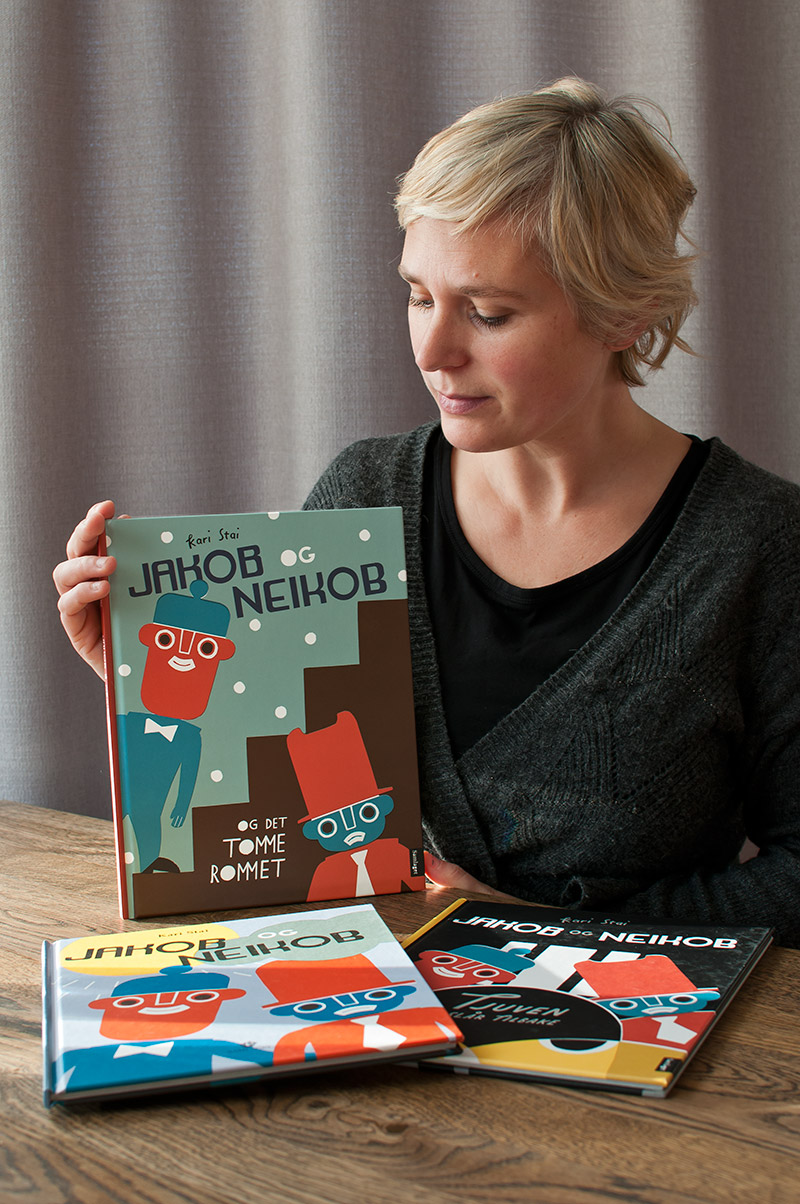
Kari Stai in 2014

Kari Stai (born 1974) is a Norwegian illustrator, graphic designer and children's writer. In 2012, she was awarded the Brage Prize for children's literature with her Jakob og Neikob. Tjuven slår tilbake.
