= Rønnaug Kleiva =

Norwegian writer (born 1951)

- Born: 30 November 1951 (age 73); Vartdal Municipality, Norway
- Occupation: Writer
- Awards: Norwegian Critics Prize for Literature

Rønnaug Kleiva (born 30 November 1951) is a Norwegian poet, novelist, writer of short stories, playwright, and author of children's literature. She received the Norwegian Critics Prize for Literature in 1997 for the children's book Ikkje gløym å klappe katten.

== Life and career ==
Born in Vartdal Municipality on 30 November 1951, Kleiva is a schoolteacher by education.

She made her literary debut in 1985 with the poetry collection Animasjon. Her 1986 book Å fø fram ein kalv om vinteren is a collection of poetic prose. Her first children's book was Fuglane kor dei flyg from 1988, and she followed up with Kven sin dag er dette in 1989. Her novel Plutseleg no (1990) for young adults was awarded Noregs Mållag's children's book prize in 1990. Her poetry collection Balansepunkt (1990) is characterized by Øystein Rottem as having a darker colour. Her picture book Ein underleg vinter (1991) was illustrated by Malgorzats Piotronska. She published the children's book Einmannsbåten in 1993, and the children's book Eg greier meg (1994) is illustrated by Lars Elling. Her poetry collection I ovnen er lammet (1995), illustrated by Arne Nøst, contains erotic motives. In 1996 she issued the non-fiction book Greske gudar og gudinner.

Her children's book Ikkje gløym å klappe katten (1997), illustrated by Inger Lise Belsvik, earned her the Norwegian Critics Prize for Literature for best children's book in 1997.

With Kjærleik på pinne frå Ouagadougou she won a prize in a Nordic children's book contest in 1999. Her picture book Om dagen kan ein flyge (2001) was illustrated by Akin Düzakin. In 2001 she also wrote the short story collection Fangeteneste, and the play Kvinner med fingermanualar.

In 2003 she wrote the novel Ingen reell fare, and the play Ein ettermiddag came in 2004. In 2005 she issued both the short prose collection La oss krysse Nilen and the picture book Eg rømmer. She wrote two novels for young adults in 2007 and 2009, where the protagonist Susi is compared with a post-war country, Andre sida av Paris (2007), and Vegen heim frå Sarajevo (2009), treating harassment and rape, respectively. A play version from 2014, titled Etter omleiringa, was published in 2015.

Further books are the short story collection Ikkje for varmt, ikkje for kaldt (2008 or 2010), and the prose collection Notat vedrøyrande kjærleik (2010). She wrote the play Vi skal ikkje gjere ting halvt lenger in 2011, and was assigned as inhouse dramatist at Dramatikkens hus from 2013 to 2015. Later books are the short story collection Western Desert (2017), the novel Liljene på stranda (2019), and Vinden og kattane (2021), a novel for young adults.
