= Hans Fredrik Dahl =

Norwegian historian and journalist

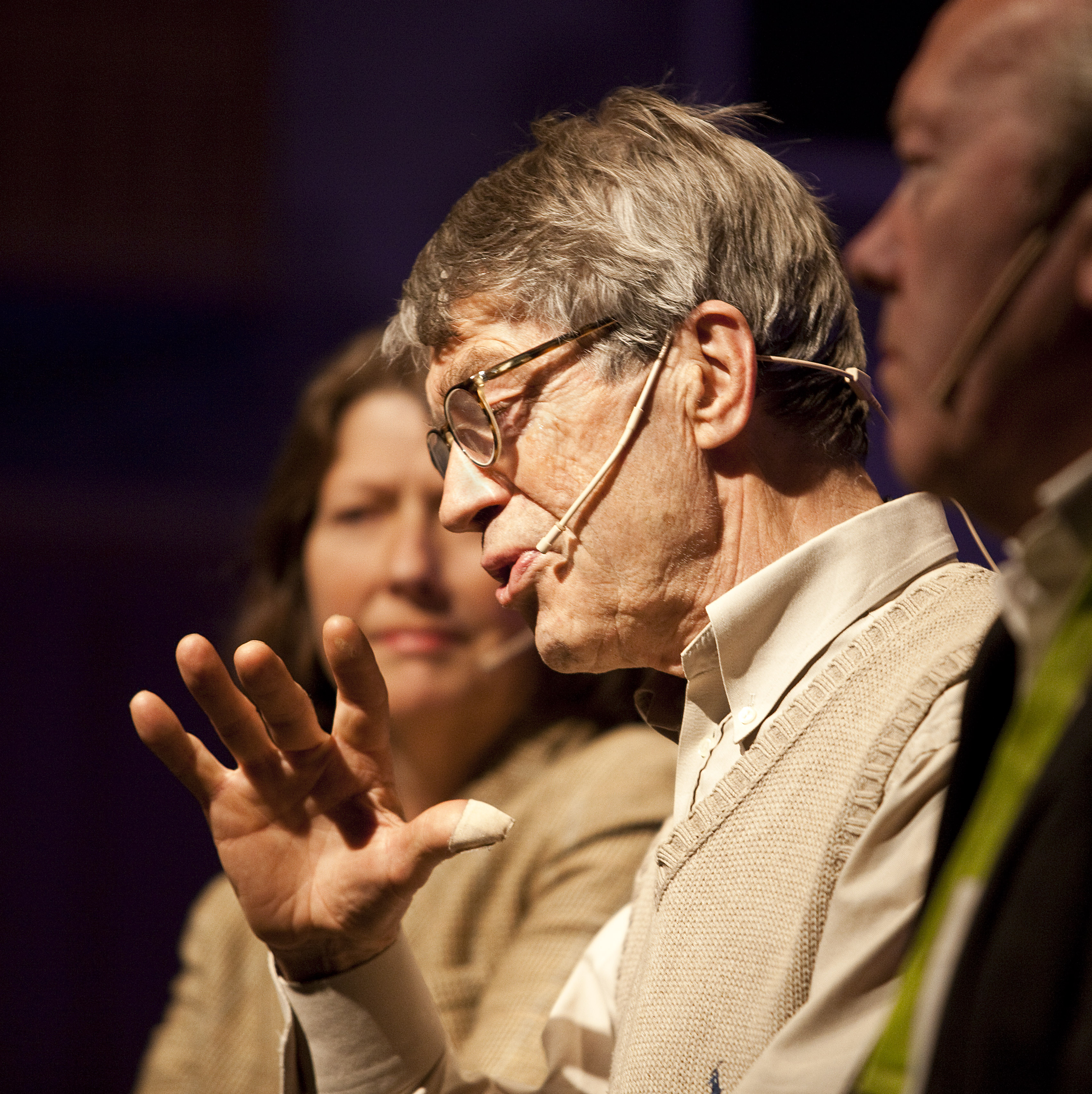
- Dahl in 2010
- Born: 16 October 1939 (age 86); Oslo, Norway
- Occupations: Historian, journalist and media scholar
- Spouse: Tove Stang Dahl

Hans Fredrik Dahl (born 16 October 1939) is a Norwegian historian, journalist and media scholar, best known in the English-speaking world for his biography of Vidkun Quisling, a Nazi collaborationist and Minister President for Norway during the Second World War. His research is focused on media history, the totalitarian ideologies of the 20th century, and the Second World War. He served as culture editor of Dagbladet 1978–1985 and has been a board member of the paper since 1996. He was a professor at the University of Oslo 1988–2009, and is now a professor emeritus.

== Personal life ==
Dahl was born in Oslo, the son of Jacob Dahl, an engineer, and his wife Sophie Harbitz. He was married to jurist and pioneer of feminist jurisprudence Tove Stang Dahl (née Tove Thiis Stang) from 1960 to 1993, and to art historian Elisabeth Elster from 1996. He is a maternal grandson of pathologist Francis Harbitz, and a cousin of historian Francis Sejersted.

In his younger days he defined himself as a Marxist and Socialist, and was elected head of the Norwegian Students' Society as the left-wing candidate in 1963. He converted to Catholicism in the 2000s, after recovering from a serious illness.

== Career ==
Dahl has written two books on the history of the Norwegian Broadcasting Corporation (NRK): Hallo-Hallo (1975) and Dette er London (1978). He was cultural editor of the newspaper Dagbladet from 1978 to 1985, and from 1988 to 2009 professor at the University of Oslo. Dahl has been co-editor of the encyclopaedias Pax Leksikon (1978–1981) and Norsk krigsleksikon 1940-45 (1995), and the four-volume press history Norsk presses historie 1660–2010. He is, however, most famous in the English-speaking world for the book Quisling: A Study in Treachery, a two-volume biography of the politician and Minister-President Vidkun Quisling; it was condensed into one volume upon translation into English.

He is a fellow of the Norwegian Academy of Science and Letters. In 2000 he received the Fritt Ord Honorary Award.

== Selected works ==
- Norge mellom krigene (1971)
- Hallo-Hallo. Kringkastingen i Norge 1920–1940 (1975)
- "Dette er London". NRK i krig 1940–1945 (1978)
- Vidkun Quisling. En fører blir til (biography, 1991)
- Vidkun Quisling. En fører for fall (biography, 1992)
