= List of Danish poets =

This is a list of Danish poets, including those who are Danish by nationality or who write in the Danish language (years link to the corresponding "[year] in poetry) article):

== A ==
- Christen Lauridsen Aagaard (1616–1664)
- Emil Aarestrup (1800–1856)
- Werner Hans Frederik Abrahamson (1744–1812)
- Naja Marie Aidt (born 1963), poet and writer
- Benny Andersen (1929–2018), songwriter, poet, author, composer, pianist; a member of the Danish Academy since 1972, and "probably Denmark's most popular poet", according to DR, the Danish public broadcasting organization.
- Hans Christian Andersen (1805–1875), poet and author
- Vita Andersen (1944–2021), writer and poet
- Kristian Arentzen (1823–1899)
- Anders Arrebo (1587–1637)

== B ==
- Jens Baggesen (1764–1826)
- Solvej Balle (born 1962)
- Otto Benzon (1856–1927)
- Harald Bergstedt (1877–1965) writer, novelist, playwright and a poet
- Vilhelm Bergsøe (1835–1911)
- Kristen Bjørnkjær (born 1943)
- Thorkild Bjørnvig (1918–2004)
- Steen Steensen Blicher (1782–1848), author and poet
- Karen Blixen, who also wrote under the pen name Isak Dinesen (1885–1962)
- Thomas Boberg (born 1960)
- Anders Bording (1619–1677), poet and journalist
- Poul Borum (1934–1996)
- Anne-Louise Bosmans (born 1978)
- Jørgen Gustava Brandt (1929–2006)
- Per Aage Brandt (1944–2021)
- Rudolf Broby-Johansen, also known as "R. Broby-Johansen" (1900–1987)
- Hans Adolph Brorson (1694–1764), bishop and hymn writer
- Friederike Brun (1765–1835)
- Malthe Conrad Bruun (1755–1826), Danish-French geographer, journalist and poet
- Suzanne Brøgger (born 1944)
- Julia Butschkow (born 1978), writer, playwright and poet
- Ludvig Bødtcher (1793–1874)
- Emil Bønnelycke (1893–1953)

== C ==
- Inger Christensen (1935–2009), poet, novelist and essayist
- Sophus Claussen (1865–1931), poet and writer
- Paul la Cour (1902–1956)

== D ==
- Erik Bøgh (1822–1899), poet and composer
- Tove Ditlevsen (1917–1976)
- Poul Dons, also known as "Povel Dons" (1783–1843)
- Christian Dorph (born 1966)
- Holger Drachmann (1846–1908), poet and playwright
- Ove Christian Drejer (1806–1836)

== E ==
- Dorthem Engelbretsdatter, also known as Dorthem Engebretsdatter (1634–1716)
- Inge Eriksen (1935–2015)
- Jesper Ewald (1893–1969), author, journalist, translator and poet
- Johannes Ewald (1743–1781), playwright and poet

== F ==
- Peter Faber (1810-1877)
- Christian Falster (1690–1752), poet and philologist
- Jens Fink-Jensen (born 1956), poet, author, photographer, composer and architect

== G ==
- Duna Ghali (born 1963)
- Otto Gelsted (1888–1968)
- Christian Graugaard (born 1967)
- Simon Grotrian (born 1961)
- N. F. S. Grundtvig (1783–1872), teacher, writer, poet, philosopher, historian, pastor and politician

== H ==
- Henriette Hanck (1807-1846)
- Carsten Hauch (1790–1872)
- Henrik Have (1946–2014)
- Johan Ludvig Heiberg (1791–1860)
- Peter Andreas Heiberg (1758–1841), author, philologist and poet
- Piet Hein (1905–1996), poet and scientist
- Johannes Helms (1828–1895), writer, poet and schoolmaster
- Henrik Hertz (1797–1870)
- Ludvig Holberg (1684–1754), Norwegian-born poet, writer, essayist, philosopher, historian and playwright who spent most of his adult life in Denmark
- Jens Christian Hostrup
- Per Højholt (1928–2004)
- Lone Hørslev (born 1974)

== I ==
- Bernhard Severin Ingemann (1789-1862)

== J ==
- F.P. Jac (1955–2008)
- Bo Green Jensen (born 1955)
- Johannes V. Jensen (1873–1950)
- Pia Juul (1962–2020)
- Frank Jæger (1926–1977)
- Johannes Jørgensen

== K ==
- Steen Kaalo (born 1945)
- Thomas Kingo (1634–1703), bishop, poet and hymn-writer
- Erik Knudsen (poet) (born 1922)
- Tom Kristensen (1893–1974)

== L ==
- Thor Lange
- Marianne Larsen (1951–2025)
- Niels Lyngsø (born 1968)

== M ==
- Ivan Malinovski (born 1926)
- Sophus Michaëlis
- Christian Molbech (1783–1857), historian, literary critic, writer and poet
- Gustaf Munch-Petersen (1912–1938)
- Arvid Müller
- Poul Martin Møller

== N ==
- Jørgen Nash
- Hendrik Nordbrandt (born 1945)

== O ==
- Adam Gottlob Oehlenschläger (1779–1850), poet and playwright who introduced Romanticism into Danish literature
- Jess Ørnsbo (born 1932)

== P ==
- Frederik Paludan-Müller (1809–1876)
- Nis Petersen (1897–1943)
- Erik Pontoppidan
- Christen Henriksen Pram

== R ==
- Knud Lyne Rahbek (1760–1830), literary historian, critic, writer, poet and magazine editor
- Gorm Henrik Rasmussen (born 1955), writer of poetry, children's books, novels and biographies
- Halfdan Rasmussen (1915–2002), writer of prose for adults and poetry for children
- Christian Richardt (1831–1892), writer, lyricist and poet
- Klaus Rifbjerg (1941–2015)
- Helge Rode (1870–1937), writer and poet
- Valdemar Rørdam, novelist and poet

== S ==
- Ole Sarvig (1921–1981)
- Jens August Schade (1903–1978)
- Sophus Schandorph (1836–1901)
- Palle Sigsgaard (born 1976)
- Schack von Staffeldt (1769–1826)
- Michael Strunge (1958–1986)
- Ambrosius Stub (1705–1758)
- Morten Søndergaard
- Jørgen Sonne (1925–2015)
- Knud Sørensen

== T ==
- Pia Tafdrup (born 1952), novelist, poet, playwright and writer
- Peter Christensen Teilmann, (born 1962)
- Søren Ulrik Thomsen (born 1956)

== W ==
- Johan Herman Wessel (1742–1785), Norwegian-Danish poet
- Anders Westenholz (1936–2010), psychologist, writer and poet
- Christian Winther (1796–1876)
- Ole Wivel (born 1921)

== See also ==
- Danish literature
- List of Danish authors
