= Weekendavisen Book Award =

Danish literary award

The Weekendavisen Book Award (Danish: Weekendavisens litteraturpris) is an annual literary award presented by the Danish newspaper Weekendavisen ("The Weekend Newspaper"). The nominees are selected in December by Weekendavisen's corps of literary critics, and the final winner is selected by the readers. The ceremony takes place in January the following year.

== Recipients ==
- 1980: Suzanne Brøgger for Brøg
- 1981: Marie Hammer for Forsker i fem verdensdele
- 1982: Villy Sørensen for Ragnarok
- 1983: Jørgen Christian Hansen for Knæleren
- 1984: Poul Behrendt for Bissen og dullen
- 1985: Anna Sophie Seidelin for Genfortælling af det nye testamente
- 1986: Bent William Rasmussen for En dag i Amerika
- 1987: Peter Bastian for Ind i musikken
- 1988: Peter Høeg for Forestilling om det tyvende århundrede
- 1989: Ib Michael for Kilroy Kilroy
- 1990: Peter Seeberg for Rejsen til Ribe
- 1991: Søren Ulrik Thomsen for Hjemfalden
- 1992: Birgitte Possing for Natalie Zahle. Viljens styrke
- 1993: Benny Andersen for Denne kommen og gåen
- 1994: Pia Tafdrup for Territorialsang
- 1995: Peter Schepelern for Filmleksikon
- 1996: Bettina Heltberg for Hvor der handles
- 1997: Knud Sørensen for En tid
- 1998: Anne Marie Løn for Dværgenes dans
- 1999: Hans Edvard Nørregård-Nielsen for Mands minde
- 2000: Joakim Garff for SAK
- 2001: Kristian Ditlev Jensen for Det bliver sagt
- 2002: Bent Jensen for Gulag og glemsel
- 2003: Jens Andersen for Andersen – en biografi
- 2004: Jørgen Jensen for Danmarks oldtid
- 2005: Jørgen Leth for Det uperfekte menneske
- 2006: Knud Romer for Den som blinker er bange for døden
- 2007: Jens Smærup Sørensen for Mærkedage
- 2008: Mikkel Kirkebæk for Schalburg – en patriotisk landsforræder
- 2009: Anne Lise Marstrand-Jørgensen for Hildegard
- 2010: Birgithe Kosovic for Det dobbelte land
- 2011 Erik Valeur for Det syvende barn
- 2012: Kim Leine for Profeterne i Evighedsfjorden
- 2013: Yahya Hassan for Digte
- 2014: Tom Buk-Swienty for Kaptajn Dinesen - Til døden os skiller
- 2015: Pia Fris Laneth for 1915. Da kvinder og tyende blev borgere
- 2016: Flemming Rose for De besatte
- 2017: Naja Marie Aidt for Har døden taget noget fra dig, så giv det tilbage - Carls bog
- 2018: Niels Brunse for Shakespeares samlede skuespil I-VI (translation)
- 2019 Jeanette Varberg for Viking. Ran, ild og sværd
- 2020 Stine Pilgaard for Meter i sekundet
- 2021 Rakel Haslund-Gjerrild for Adam i Paradis
- 2022 Christian Egander Skov for Borgerlig krise
- 2023 Mathilde Walter Clark for Det blinde øje
- 2024 Michael Stoltze for Danske dagsommerfugle
