= Danish Critics Prize for Literature =

The Danish Critics Prize for Literature (in Danish: Kritikerprisen) is an annual Danish literature award. It was established in 1957 by the Danish Publishers Association. Since 1971 the award has been made by the Danish Literature Critics Association (Litteraturkritikernes Lav) after a vote by members. The award currently carries a prize of DKK 30,000. The Association also awards the Georg Brandes-Prize.

== Recipients of the Prize ==
- 1957 – Karen Blixen and Per Lange
- 1958 – Poul Ørum: Lyksalighedens Ø (novel) and Frank Jæger: Velkommen, vinter
- 1959 – Villy Sørensen: Digtere og dæmoner – fortolkninger og vurderinger (essays) and Willy-August Linnemann: Døden må have en årsag (novel)
- 1960 – Ole Sarvig
- 1961 – Cecil Bødker
- 1962 – Albert Dam
- 1963 – Leif Panduro: Fern fra Danmark (novel)
- 1964 – Erik Aalbæk Jensen: Perleporten (novel)
- 1965 – Klaus Rifbjerg: Amagerdigte (poems)
- 1966 – Benny Andersen
- 1967 – Jørgen Gustava Brandt
- 1968 – Anders Bodelsen
- 1969 – Inger Christensen: Det (poems)
- 1970 – Peter Seeberg: Hyrder (novel)
- 1971 – Elsa Gress: Fuglefri og fremmed (memoirs)
- 1972 – Christian Kampmann
- 1973 – Aage Dons: Nødstedt i natten (novel)
- 1974 – Allan Bock
- 1975 – Thorkild Bjørnvig
- 1976 – Svend Aage Madsen: Tugt og utugt i mellemtiden (novel)
- 1977 – Tage Skou-Hansen: Den hårde frugt (novel)
- 1978 – Vagn Lundbye: Tilbage til Anholt (novel)
- 1979 – Erik Stinus: Jorden under himlen (poems)
- 1980 – William Heinesen: Her skal danses (novel)
- 1981 – Henrik Stangerup: Vejen til Lagoa Santa (novel)
- 1982 – Kirsten Thorup: Himmel og helvede (novel)
- 1983 – Dorrit Willumsen: Maria (novel)
- 1984 – Henrik Nordbrandt: 84 digte (poems)
- 1985 – Hanne Marie Svendsen: Guldkuglen (novel)
- 1986 – Bo Green Jensen: Porten til jorden (poems)
- 1987 – Vita Andersen: Hva'for en hånd (novel)
- 1988 – Mette Winge: Skriverjomfruen (novel)
- 1989 – Jens Smærup Sørensen: Katastrofe (novel)
- 1990 – Gynther Hansen: Danskerne (novel)
- 1991 – Ib Michael: Vanillepigen (novel)
- 1992 – Peer Hultberg: Byen og verden (novel)
- 1993 – Peter Høeg: De måske egnede (novel)
- 1994 – Christian Skov: Høstnætter (novel)
- 1995 – Per Højholt: Praksis, 11: Lynskud (poems) and Stenvaskeriet (essays)
- 1996 – Jytte Borberg: Verdens ende (novel)
- 1997 – Knud Sørensen: En tid (novel)
- 1998 – Bent Vinn Nielsen: En skidt knægt (novel)
- 1999 – Vibeke Grønfeldt: Det rigtige (novel)
- 2000 – Henning Mortensen: Raketter (novel)
- 2001 – Sven Holm: Kanten af himlen (short stories)
- 2002 – Camilla Christensen: Jorden under Høje Gladsaxe (novel)
- 2003 – Peter Laugesen: Forstad til alt (poems)
- 2004 – Katrine Marie Guldager: København (short stories)
- 2005 – Helle Helle: Rødby-Puttgarden (novel)
- 2006 – Naja Marie Aidt: Bavian (short stories)
- 2007 – Hans Otto Jørgensen: Med plads til hundrede køer (novel)
- 2008 – Klaus Høeck: Palimpsest (poems)
- 2009 – Eske K. Mathiesen: Bonjour monsieur Satie (poems)
- 2010 – Christina Hesselholdt: Camilla – og resten af selskabet (prose)
- 2011 – Lars Frost: Skønvirke (prose)
- 2012 – Pia Juul: Afsted, til stede (short stories)
- 2013 – Niels Frank: Nellies bog (novel)
- 2014 – Harald Voetmann: Alt under månen (novel)
- 2015 – Ursula Andkjær Olsen: Udgående fartøj (poems)
- 2016 – Rasmus Nikolajsen: Tilbage til unaturen (poems)
- 2017 – Ida Jessen: Doktor Bagges anagrammer (novel)
- 2018 – C.Y. Frostholm: Træmuseet (essays)
- 2019 – Pablo Llambías: Zombierådhus (novel)
- 2020 – Asta Olivia Nordenhof: Scandinavian Star. Del 1 - Penge på lommen (novel)
