= Søren Gyldendal Prize =

Danish literary award

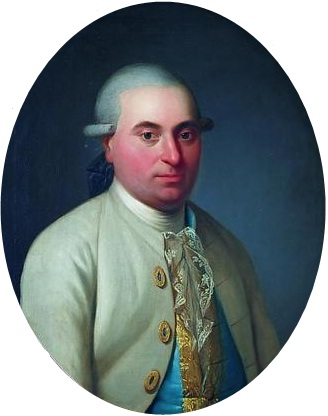
Portrait of Søren Gyldendal

The Søren Gyldendal Prize (Danish: Søren Gyldendal-Prisen) is a Danish literary award, which was established in 1958 by Gyldendal Publishing House. The prize is awarded annually on 12 April, the anniversary of the birthday of Søren Gyldendal (1742-1802) founder of Gyldendal Publishing House. In 1958 the prize was DKK 10,000. In the period 1991 to 2000 it was increased to DKK 100,000. From 2001 to 2008 it was DKK 150,000. Since 2009 it has been DKK 200,000.

== Recipients of the prize ==
Year	Recipient
2025	Stine Askov
2025	Bjørn Rasmussen
2024	Katrine Marie Guldager
2023	Harald Voetmann
2022	Maria Helleberg
2021	Anne Lise Marstrand-Jørgensen
2020	Ursula Andkjær Olsen
2019	Kim Leine
2018	Anne-Marie Mai
2017	Kirsten Hammann
2016	Morten Møller
2015	Søren Ulrik Thomsen
2014	Lone Frank
2013	Jens Smærup Sørensen
2012	Carsten Jensen
2011	Naja Marie Aidt
2010	Tom Buk-Swienty
2009	Ida Jessen
2008	Peter Øvig Knudsen
2007	Jens Christian Grøndahl
2006	Jens Andersen
2005	Pia Tafdrup
2004	Keld Zeruneith
2003	Hanne-Vibeke Holst
2002	Bo Lidegaard
2001	Bent Vinn Nielsen
2000	Frans Lasson
1999	Suzanne Brøgger
1998	Niels Birger Wamberg
1997	Bjarne Reuter
1996	Hans Hertel
1995	Dorrit Willumsen
1994	Hanne Engberg
1993	Ib Michael
1992	Jørgen Jensen
1991	Vita Andersen
1990	Søren Mørch
1989	Klaus Høeck
1988	Else Roesdahl
1987	Cecil Bødker
1987	Henrik Nordbrandt
1987	Kirsten Thorup
1986	Hans Edvard Nørregård-Nielsen
1985	Svend Åge Madsen
1984	Thomas Bredsdorff
1983	Inger Christensen
1982	Svend Cedergreen Bech
1982	Erik Kjersgaard
1981	Anders Bodelsen
1980	Hakon Lund
1979	Tage Skou-Hansen
1978	Paul Hammerich
1977	Erik Aalbæk Jensen
1976	Jørgen Knudsen
1975	Leif Panduro
1974	Elsa Gress
1973	Poul Ørum
1972	Johan Fjord Jensen
1971	Tove Ditlevsen
1970	Tage Kaarsted
1969	Klaus Rifbjerg
1968	Torben Brostrøm
1967	Hans Lyngby Jepsen
1966	P.V. Glob
1965	Villy Sørensen
1964	Ole Sarvig
1963	Thorkild Hansen
1963	Palle Lauring
1962	Frank Jæger
1961	Jørgen Hæstrup
1960	Thorkild Bjørnvig
1959	K.E. Løgstrup
1959	Sven Møller Kristensen
1958	Willy-August Linnemann
