= Otto Gelsted Prize =

Danish literary award

The Otto Gelsted Prize (Otto Gelsted-prisen) is a Danish literary award which was founded in 1970 by the Otto Gelsted Memorial Fund (Otto Gelsteds Mindefond), heir of the Danish author Otto Gelsted (1888–1968). The prize is awarded annually by the Danish Academy; it is currently 65,000 DKK.

== Recipients ==
Year	Recipients
2023	Caroline Albertine Minor
2022	Lone Aburas
2021	C.Y. Frostholm
2019	Christina Hagen
2018	Jeppe Brixvold
2017	Christian Lollike
2016	Peder Frederik Jensen
2015	Lars Skinnebach
2014	Harald Voetmann
2013	Anne Lise Marstrand-Jørgensen
2012	Klaus Lynggaard
2011	Lars Bonnevie
2010	Ursula Andkjær Olsen
2009	Per Åge Brandt
2008	Pablo Llambias
2007	Hans Otto Jørgensen
2006	Niels Hausgaard
2005	Asger Paardekooper
2004	Ebbe Kløvedal Reich
2003	Otto Steen Due
2002	Erik Skyum-Nielsen
2001	Inge Eriksen
2000	Thomas Boberg
1999	Niels Frank
1998	Bo Green Jensen
1997	Carsten Jensen
1996	Peter Poulsen
1995	Erik Stinus
1994	Elias Bredsdorff
1993	Bent Vinn Nielsen
1992	Per Øhrgaard
1991	Niels Barfoed
1990	Svend Johansen
1989	Ejvind Larsen
1988	Knud Sørensen
1987	Eske K. Mathiesen
1985	Søren Ulrik Thomsen
1983	Michael Strunge
1982	Vibeke Grønfeldt
1980	Michael Buchwald
1978	Ib Michael
1976	Steen Kaalø
1974	Kirsten Thorup
1972	Jens Smærup Sørensen
