= Gorm =

Gorm may refer to:

== Computing ==
- Gorm (computing), a rapid application development tool
- GORM, the "fantastic ORM library" for the Go programming language
- Grails Object-Relational Mapping, see Grails (framework) § Persistence

== People ==
- Gorm the Old (died 958), Danish king
- Gorm, Danish chieftain defeated by the Welsh king Rhodri the Great in 855
- Gorm Jensen (1886–1968), Danish Olympic gymnast
- Prince Gorm of Denmark (1919–1991), grandson of King Frederik VIII
- Gorm Henrik Rasmussen (born 1955), Danish poet
- Gorm Kjernli (born 1981), Norwegian politician

== Other uses ==
- Danish ironclad Gorm, a monitor built for the Royal Danish Navy in the 1860s
- Gorm Gulthyn, a god in Dungeons & Dragons
- House of Gorm, a Danish ruling family
- Sail Gorm, a mountain range in Sutherland, Scotland
- Island of Gorm, a fictional place from the children's toy 'Gormiti'
- Gorm, the Irish and Scottish Gaelic word for "blue"; see Blue–green distinction in language § Celtic
- Gorm, a range of storage furniture sold by Swedish outlet IKEA
- Gorm Field, a natural gas and oil field in the North Sea
