= Iselin C. Hermann =

Danish writer (born 1959)

Iselin C. Hermann (born 22 June 1959) is a Danish writer.

== Early life and education ==
Hermann is the daughter of auctioneer Jens Hermann and Kinne Hermann. She graduated from Ingrid Jespersens Gymnasieskole in 1977 and subsequently studied at a theater program in Aix-en-Provence, as well as at the École Nationale du Cirque in Paris, where she was trained as a tightrope walker and circus performer. She studied theater arts and Italian language at Copenhagen University from 1979 to 1981and completed a master's degree in Danish at the same institution in 1986 with a thesis focusing on themes of fragmentation in the works of author Henrik Nordbrandt.

== Career ==
Hermann worked as an assistant director at the Folketeatret and Gladsaxe Teater from 1979 to 1981 and later became a member of Torben Jetsmark's troupe “Tribunen.” She started work in the publishing industry in 1982 as a secretary at Christian Ejlers Forlag. She held the same position with Brøndums Forlag, from 1984 to 1991, and from 1991 to 1998 with Brøndom/Aschehoug. Since 1998, she has worked full-time as an author.

=== Writing ===
Hermann's debut as an author was her 1998 epistolary novel Prioritaire, which has been published in more than 20 countries, and was one of the most successful Danish author debuts in recent times. Prioritaire has appeared in English under two different titles: Priority and Special Delivery. The English translator was G. Forester.

Since publishing her debut novel, Hermann has written addition novels for adults, as well as books for children.

Hermann received multiple grants from Statens Kunstfond between 2004 and 2007.

== Personal life ==
Hermann lives in Copenhagen and has three grown sons from her marriage to publisher Hans Jørgen Brøndum, which ended in divorce in 2004.
