= Baboon (short story collection) =

2006 short story collection by Naja Marie Aidt

- First edition
- Author: Naja Marie Aidt
- Language: Danish
- Genre: short stories
- Published: 2006
- Publisher: Gyldendal
- Publication place: Denmark
- Awards: Nordic Council's Literature Prize of 2008

Baboon (Danish: Bavian) is a 2006 short story collection by Danish author Naja Marie Aidt. It was translated into English by Denise Newman in 2014.

== Awards and honours ==
- 2007 Danish Critics Prize for Literature
- 2008 Nordic Council's Literature Prize
- 2015 PEN Translation Prize
- 2015 Best Translated Book Award, longlist
