= Tafdrup =

Tafdrup is a Danish surname. Notable people with the surname include:

- Christian Tafdrup (born 1978), Danish actor and filmmaker
- Pia Tafdrup (born 1952), Danish writer
