= Birgitte Possing =

Danish historian (born 1952)

Birgitte Possing (born 1952) is a Danish historian who has specialized in historical biography. In 1992, paying special attention to aspects relating to gender, she earned a doctorate with Viljens styrke, a biography of the pioneering feminist and educator Natalie Zahle. Possing has headed the manuscript department of the Danish National Library and coordinated research at the National Museum of Denmark. From 2000 to 2004, she was director of Danmarks Humanistiske Forskningscenter (Danish Institute for Advanced Studies in the Humanities) after which she was appointed senior researcher at the Danish National Archives. In the late 1990s, while collaborating with Kvinfo on Dansk kvindebiografisk leksikon covering women's biographies, Possing identified 1,140 Danish women of historical importance who had not been included in the authoritative biographical dictionary Dansk Biografisk Leksikon.

== Biography ==
Born in Kolding on 8 May 1952, Birgitte Possing, one of four children, was the daughter of a nurse and a dentist. Both were from Copenhagen but had moved to Kolding on the east coast of Jutland to bring their children up near the surrounding woods and seashore. She studied history and ethnography at Aarhus University, graduating as Cand.mag. in 1979. She later earned a doctorate from the University of Copenhagen (1992).

After teaching for a year at the Nordic Folk High School for Women (Den Nordiske Kvindehøjskole) in Visby, she turned to research and lecturing, spending four years (1986–1990) at the Royal Danish School of Educational Studies (Danmarks Lærerhøjskole) in Copenhagen. From 1991 to 1998, she was chief archivist and head of the Manuscript Department at the Royal Danish Library where she was responsible for the registration of literary sources. After two years serving as director of research at the National Museum (1998–2000), she was appointed director of the Danish Institute for Advanced Studies in the Humanities. After gaining the status of professor at the University of Southern Denmark in 1999, in 2000 she was appointed senior research fellow at the Danish National Archives. Since 2006, she has been an affiliated professor at the University of Copenhagen.

In connection with her biography of Natalie Zahle, Possing commented: "I came across her archive while trying to find out why the distribution of power and gender had been the way it was in Denmark. I discovered that all the women who were pioneers in Denmark came from her school — all those who made their mark in science, politics, education and business. I thought something must have happened that we haven't had explained. So I decided to restore her legacy."

== Selected publications ==
Birgitte Possing has published ten books and more than 60 articles, including:

- Viljens Styrke. Natalie Zahle - en biografi om køn, dannelse og magtfuldkommenhed (Gyldendal 1992) ISBN 87-00-30636-3
- Zahle. At vække sjælen (Gyldendal 2001) ISBN 87-02-00393-7
- Uden omsvøb. Et portræt af Bodil Koch (Gyldendal 2007) ISBN 978-87-02-05970-0
- Den farlige biografi (Fund og Forskning, 2012).
- Ind i biografien (Gyldendal 2015) ISBN 978-87-02-17118-1
- Argumenter mod Kvinder (Strandberg Publishing 2018) ISBN 978-87-93604-18-6

== Awards and distinctions ==
Among Possing's awards and distinctions are:

- 1992: Weekendavisen Book Award for Viljens styrke (biography of Natalie Zahle)
- 2004: Einar Hansen's Research Foundation Honorary Prize
- 2008: Kraka Award for Et portræt af Bodil Koch
- 2014: Danish Authors Society's non-fiction award
