= Erik Aalbæk Jensen =

Danish writer and Lutheran minister (1923–1997)

- Born: 19 August 1923; Thy, Denmark
- Died: 30 September 1997 (aged 74)
- Occupation: Writer
- Known for: Winning the Danish Critics Prize for Literature and the Søren Gyldendal Prize
- Notable work: Perleporten

Erik Aalbæk Jensen (19 August 1923 – 30 September 1997) was a Danish writer and Lutheran minister who was awarded both the Danish Critics Prize for Literature and the Søren Gyldendal Prize for his works, most notably Perleporten.

== Life ==
The son of a teacher, Jensen grew up in the rural area Thy and neighbouring Vendsyssel in North Jutland and, after a visit to the Aalborg Cathedral, began a study of Evangelic theology. During World War II, he began to be involved with the Danish resistance movement of the Nazi German occupation of Denmark and was, after his arrest, sent to a concentration camp. After the end of the war, he continued his studies and, according to his ordination, became a pastor of the Danish People's Church in Osted.

He first made literary his debut in 1948 by posting contributions to the magazine Heretica before publishing his first novel, Dommen (The Judgment), in 1949, which was followed by Dæmningen (The Dam) in 1952. Both novels were characterized by the moral problems of the debate about values. In a later period, he wrote narrative novels about the German occupation period, such as Drømmen om det glemte (Dream of the Forgotten, 1954), Gertrud (1956), and I heltespor (In Heroes' Trail, 1960). In 1957, he became a journalist at DR, where he was a TV director from 1959 to 1964.

One of his main works was the 1964 novel Perleporten on the social and ideological opposites in the north fjord in the 1930s, which was well received by critics.

After this great success, which at the same time meant his breakthrough as a writer, he wrote Sagen (The Case) (1971), a continuation of Perleporten (The Pearly Gate), in which the persons from the previous novel were involved in land development trade during the boom period of the 1960s. A further sequel, Kridtstregen (The Line of Chalk, 1976), dealt with the story of two brothers and their German-side volunteership on the Eastern Front during World War II and as a deserter between 1941 and 1945. For Kridtstregen, which was adapted to film in 1983 under the title Forræderne (The Traitors) by Ole Roose, he was awarded the Søren Gyldendal Prize in 1977.

Another focus of the work of Jensen was into Danish lifestyles and attitudes, especially in the remote regions of Denmark. The resulting eight-volume topographic-ethnological work entitled Livet på øerne (Life on the Islands, 1981–1987) was based on a study of all the inhabited islands of Denmark.

After this extensive work, he turned back to fiction and wrote a double novel about the private and moral power struggle of a journalist in Frederikshavn from 1943 to 1957 with Herrens mark (Field of the Lord, also meaning 'helpless', 1990) and Magtens folk (The people of power, 1991). His last novel, Særlige vilkår (Special Conditions, 1994), and the posthumously released Enkebal (Widow's Ball, i.e. Single-Women's Party), dealt especially with the development of the new, stronger role of the women's roles in Denmark between the 1950s and 1970s.

He died before completing his literary project to portray modern Denmark in his childhood region, Vendsyssel. His books combined sociological and psychological curiosity with the precision for details, analytical insight and social overview of a fifty-year social and mental history. In addition to the milieu, he also described landscapes, companies and people of all age groups and thereby continued the traditions of authors of similar fields, such as Henrik Pontoppidan, Martin A. Hansen, Hans Kirk and Hans Scherfig. Through his sense of a comprehensive epic composition and his empathy, he reached a broad reader audience.

Jensen is the father of the prolific and controversial film producer Peter Aalbæk Jensen.

== Bibliography (selection) ==
- Sagen, 1974
- Perleporten, 1977
