= Kirsten Thorup =

Danish writer

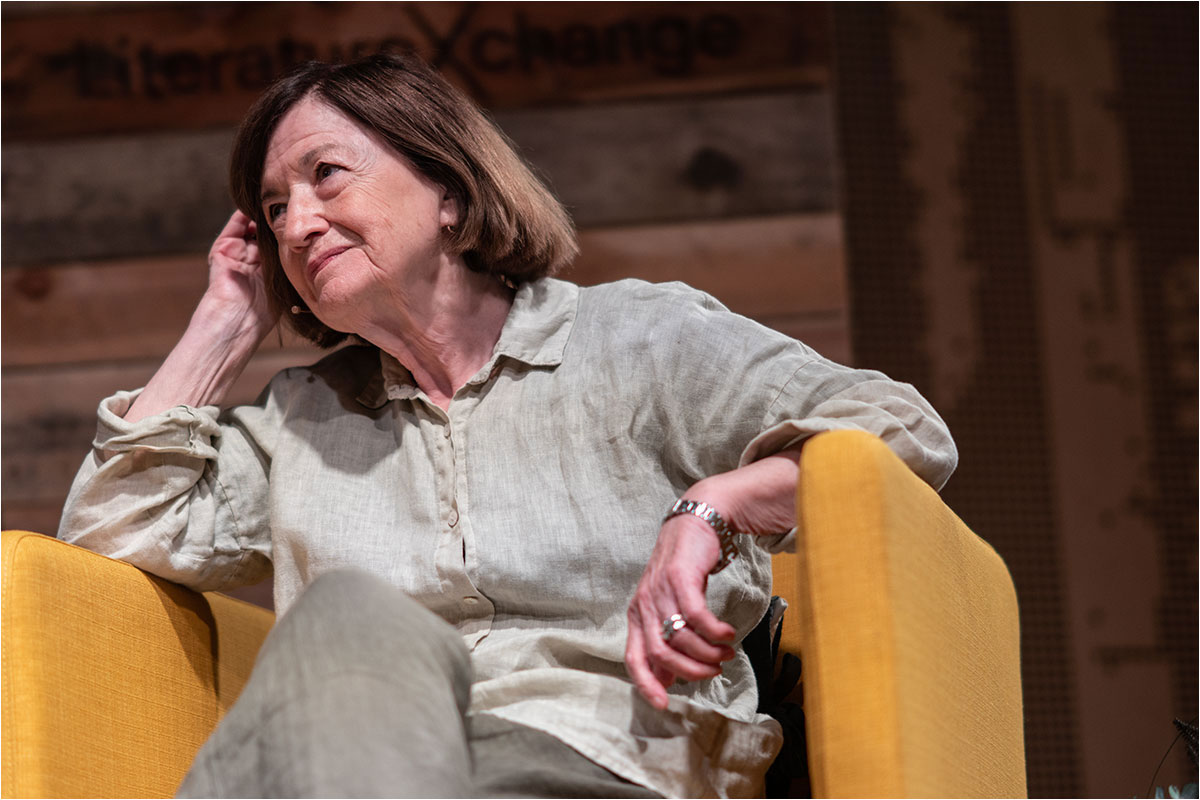
- LiteratureXchange Festival, Aarhus 2024; Photo Hreinn Gudlaugsson
- Born: February 9, 1942 (age 84) Gelsted, Funen, Denmark
- Occupation: Author
- Language: Danish
- Notable awards: Søren Gyldendal Prize (1987) Danish Critics Prize for Literature (1982); De Gyldne Laurbær (1982); Otto Gelsted Prize (1974); Grand Prize of the Danish Academy (2000) Nordic Council Literature Prize (2017)
- Spouse: Ib Thorup (1963-1974)

Kirsten Thorup (born 1942) is a Danish author.

== Background and education ==
Kirsten Thorup was born in Gelsted, Funen, Denmark in 1942. After a brief stay in Cambridge as an au pair, she studied English at the University of Copenhagen, dropping out after her first year.

== Literary works ==
Thorup is the author of poetry collections, a volume of short stories, works written for films, television, and radio, but is best known for her novels, established as one of the most widely read novelists in Denmark. Her novel Baby has been translated into English. Her novel, Den lange sommer, was published in Denmark in 1979. Thorup's writing has moved from modernist experimentation to a more realistic style, her novels typically have female protagonists. Thorup's two most recent novels are set in Germany during World War II and follows the widow Harriet who lost her husband on the east front.

Kirsten Thorup was awarded the Nordic Council Literature Prize in 2017 and is mentioned a contender for the Nobel Prize in Literature.

Kirsten Thorup now lives in Copenhagen.

== Bibliography ==
- I dagens anledning (short stories) – 1968
- Baby (novel) – 1973
- Lille Jonna (novel) – 1977
- Den lange sommer (novel) – 1979
- Himmel og helvede (novel) – 1982
- Den yderste grænse (novel) – 1987
- Elskede ukendte (novel) – 1994
- Bonsai (novel) – 2000
- Ingenmandsland (novel) – 2003
- Erindring om kærligheden (lit: Memory of love) (novel)
- Indtil vanvid, indtil døden (novel) – 2020
- Mørket bag dig (2023)

== Recognition ==
- 1974 – Otto Gelsted Prize
- 1996 – Tagea Brandts Rejselegat
- 2000 – Grand Prize of the Danish Academy
- 2017 – Nordic Council Literature Prize
