= Mads Stage =

Danish artist (1922–2004)

- Born: 6 July 1922; Østerbro, Denmark
- Died: 28 May 2004 (aged 81); Bisserup, Denmark
- Burial place: Holsteinborg Church
- Education: Royal Danish Academy of Fine Arts

Mads Stage (6 July 1922 – 28 May 2004) was a Danish artist born in Østerbro, Copenhagen.

Stage is recognised as an esteemed illustrator and artist around the world. He is most well known for his idyllic paintings, but has also designed and illustrated postcards, posters, stamps, books, and porcelain, among other textiles.

== Career ==
Stage was a student at the Royal Academy of Fine Arts from 1941 until 1947. While there, he studied under Erik Clemmensen, the professor of painting, and Aksel Jørgensen.

Stage specialized in illustrating city scenes and landscapes, and found inspiration for many of his drawings in the beautiful scenery around his home in the Danish countryside. He produced a series of watercolors depicting Copenhagen, Stockholm, England, Wales, Scotland, Holland, Paris, Germany, Belgium, Switzerland, and the USA. He also produced illustrations of animals and birds. Many of his works have been produced as greeting and Christmas cards.

For many years, Mads Stage worked for the Danish medical industry and made a large number of scientific drawings. He has also illustrated a number books, including:

- Trækfuglene, by Steen Steensen Blicher
- Walden, by Henry David Thoreau
- The Hunter's Sketches, by Ivan Turgenev
- Assorted fairytales by Hans Christian Andersen
- Assorted children's books by Jens Fink-Jensen

== Personal life ==
Mads Stage was born on July 6, 1922, in Østerbro, Denmark to Gora and Carl Stage. On July 9, 1949, he married Agnete Bundsgaard in Ribe.

Stage died on May 28, 2004, at his home in Bisserup in southern Zealand. He is buried at Holsteinborg Church, near Slagelse.
