= Kasia Banaś =

Polish painter and sculptor

Kasia Banas (born 1973 in Wrocław, Poland) is a Polish artist.

She studied painting, graphics and sculpture at the art academy in Wrocław, from where she graduated in 1997. She works with painting and graphic design and has had several exhibitions in many European countries.

In 2007, Kasia Banas carried out a project including paintings inspired by the poetry of Danish poet Henrik Nordbrandt – and again in 2012 a new project including paintings inspired by the poetry of Danish poet Jens Fink-Jensen.
