= Drømmebroer =

Book by Henrik Nordbrandt

- First edition
- Author: Henrik Nordbrandt
- Language: Danish
- Genre: poetry
- Published: 2000
- Publisher: Gyldendal
- Publication place: Denmark
- Awards: Nordic Council's Literature Prize, 2000

Drømmebroer (lit. Dream Bridges) is a 2000 poetry collection by Danish poet Henrik Nordbrandt. It won the 2000 Nordic Council's Literature Prize.
