= Else Roesdahl =

Danish medievalist and archaeologist (born 1942)

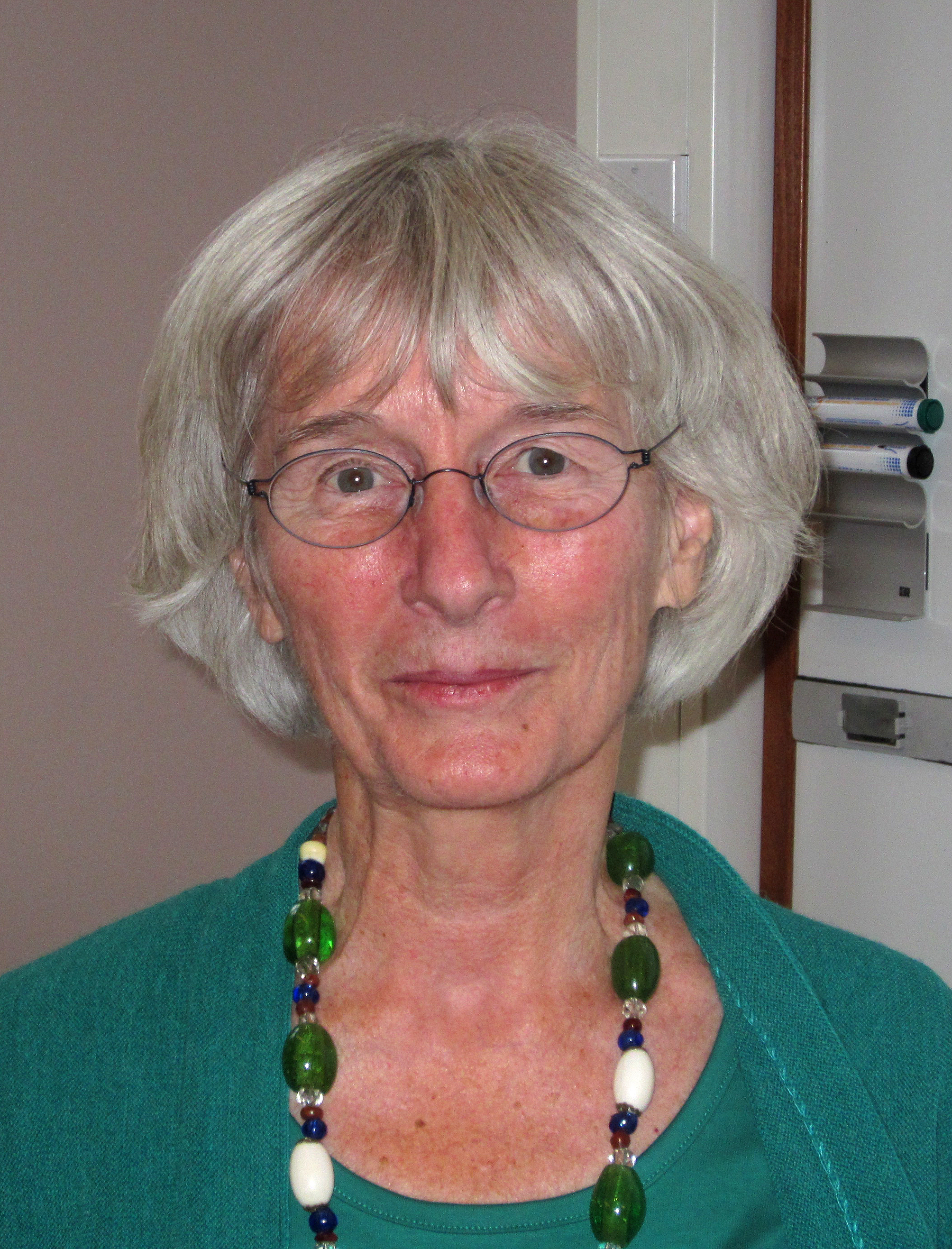
Else Roesdahl

Else Roesdahl (born 26 February 1942) is a Danish archaeologist, historian and educator. She has mediated the history of the Vikings for most of her life, including coordination of notable exhibitions on the Viking Age and authoring several books on the subject. Roesdahl's books have been translated into several languages.

Her popular book The Vikings was first published in English in 1991.

== Biography ==
Born in Sønderborg in southern Jutland, Roesdahl is the daughter of two medical doctors, Harald Eyvind Roesdahl and his wife Helene Refslund Thomsen. She and her siblings were brought up in a home where education had a high priority. After matriculating from Sønderborg Statsskole in 1960, she studied history and archaeology at Copenhagen University, graduating in 1969.

In 1970, she joined Aarhus University where she became a tenured lecturer in the newly formed Medieval Archaeology department in 1981 and ultimately a professor in 1996. Her first major work, Fyrkat : en jysk vikingeborg (1977) was on the Viking fortress at Fyrkat near Hobro in the north of Jutland, which she investigated together with Olaf Olsen. She went on to study other Viking fortifications, publishing her best seller Danmarks vikingetid in 1980, translated into English as Viking age Denmark (1982). Even more popular was her Vikingernes verden (1987), published in English as The Vikings in 1991. Roesdahl has also written many articles on the Vikings and the Middle Ages as well as a short book on the disappearance of Norsemen in Greenland titled Hvalrostand, elfenben og nordboere i Grønland (1995).

Roesdahl has also played a major role in coordinating exhibitions on the Vikings, including Vikingerne i England og hjemme i Danmark (The Vikings in England and their Danish homeland, 1981) also featured in York, England, and Viking og Hvidekrist (From Viking to Crusader, 1992) which travelled to Paris and Berlin before returning permanently to Copenhagen's National Museum of Denmark.

Now retired, Roesdahl still takes an active interest in Viking sites, opening the Fyrkat Viking Games in May 2016 and celebrating their 30th anniversary.

== Awards and Memberships ==
In 1988, Roesdahl received the Søren Gyldendal Prize, a literary award, and was later honoured as a Knight of the Order of the Dannebrog in 1992 and elevated to the knight 1st class in 2007. In 1995, she was given an honorary doctorate by Trinity College, Dublin and of University of York in 2009.

In 2022, she was elected a member of the Academia Europaea.
