= The Prophets of Eternal Fjord =

2012 novel by Kim Leine

- First edition
- Author: Kim Leine
- Original title: Profeterne i Evighedsfjorden
- Language: Danish
- Published: 2012
- Publisher: Gyldendal
- Publication place: Denmark
- Awards: Nordic Council's Literature Prize of 2013

The Prophets of Eternal Fjord (Danish: Profeterne i Evighedsfjorden) is a 2012 novel by Danish-Norwegian author Kim Leine. It won the Nordic Council's Literature Prize in 2013 and was shortlisted for the 2017 International Dublin Literary Award.
