= Aage Neutzsky-Wulff =

Danish writer and poet (1891–1967)

Aage Neutzsky-Wulff, born Aage Neutzsky Wulff, (19 August 1891 – 10 June 1967) was a Danish writer and poet.

He made his debut with "Mit livs bog" in 1921. Aage Neutzky-Wulff had several wives, including author Trolli Jørgensen from 1932 to 1935. He was the father of authors Erwin Neutzsky-Wulff and Vita Andersen, though he had no close relationship with Vita. He wrote several books on occultism, but had to publish them himself as he found it hard to find a willing publishing house.

== Bibliography ==
Might be incomplete

- 1931 "Jens Wulff og hans Livsværk"
- 1932 "Som vi er. : Noveller og Skitser"
- 1933 "Moloch : Drama i 1 Akt"
- 1933 "Shaddais Pile : Et Nutids-Passionsspil i 3 Akter"
- 1936 "Mellem Kirken og Teatret : En Kunstners Roman"
- 1941 "Jeg : et Mysterie-Drama i tre Akter"
- 1942 "Tolv Personer kører med Linie Nul : et Mysterie-Spil"
- 1943 "Tænk! : Digte i Prosa og Rim"
- 1943 "Danskere : Fem historiske Situationsbilleder"
- 1950 "Gaa til Modstand! : Dramatisk Komposition : Med et Nodebilag"
- 1952 "Prins Kundalinis Rejse gennem det mørkeste Fastland : et Eventyrspil"
- 1954 "Højsangen, ogsaa kaldet Sangenes Sang"
- 1957 "Modelteater før – og nu"
- 1957 "Den bestøvlede Kat. Eventyrkomedie i 3 Akter efter Charles Perrault"
- 1958 "Han duede ikke : en scenisk Epilog"
- 1962 "En broget Bog : Nogle hidtil utrykte skrifter"
- 1963 "Mod Obskurantismens Diktatur"
- 1964 "Af Litteraturens Skatkammer : En liden Citatbog"
- 1965 "Det essentielle : Digte"
- 1966 "Aandsvidenskabeligt og okkult Kompendium"
- 1966 "75"
- 1967 "De gale"
