= Ursula Andkjær Olsen =

Danish writer

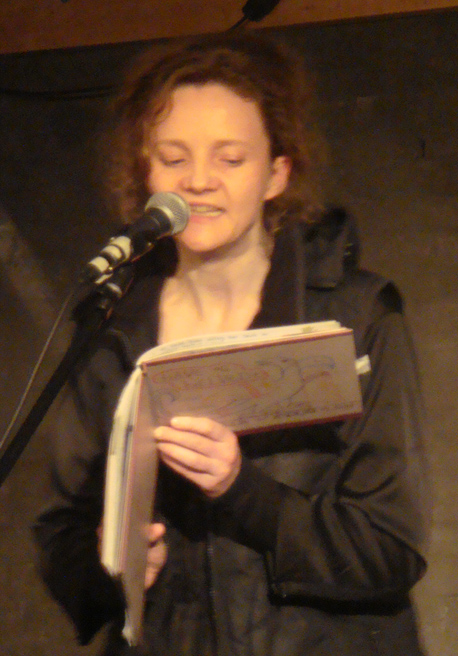
- Ursula Andkjær Olsen in 2011.
- Born: 1970 (age 55–56) Copenhagen, Denmark
- Occupation: Poet
- Language: Danish

Ursula Andkjær Olsen (born 1970) is a Danish poet. She has published a dozen poetry collections, three of which have been translated into English and published as Third-Millennium Heart (2017), Outgoing Vessel (2021), and My Jewel Box (2022).

Olsen is one of Denmark's most prominent and critically acclaimed contemporary poets. In 2017, the Danish Arts Foundation's judging panel said, in giving Olsen its Award of Distinction, "Few poets, if any, have renewed Danish poetry in the 21st century the way Ursula Andkjær Olsen has done it."

== Early life and education ==
Olsen was born in 1970 in Copenhagen, and she grew up in the capital.

She holds a master's degree in musicology and philosophy from the University of Copenhagen and Technische Universität Berlin. Early in her career, she worked for several years as a music critic for Berlingske and other newspapers. She also studied at the Forfatterskolen, an institution of higher education in Copenhagen that focuses on literary writing, graduating in 1999.

== Writing ==
=== Poetry ===
Olsen made her literary debut in 2000 with the polyphonic poetry book Lulus sange og taler. She went on to publish nearly a dozen more poetry collections.

Her 2005 collection Ægteskabet mellem vejen og udvejen attracted significant critical acclaim and became a turning point in her career. Then, 2008's Havet er en scene was nominated for the 2009 Nordic Council Literature Prize.

Though she was not selected, the following year Olsen received the Otto Gelsted Prize, and the year after she won the Holberg Medal for her overall body of work up to that point. She later received the Montanaprisen Award in 2013 for Det 3. årtusindes hjerte, described as a "polyphonic 214-page poem." She was subsequently given the Danish Critics' Prize for Literature in 2015 for Udgående Fartøj, sometimes described as a sequel to or, in Olsen's words, "a dark twin" of Det 3. årtusindes hjerte. In 2017, the Danish Arts Foundation gave her its Award of Distinction. Most recently, Olsen's 2020 poetry collection Mit smykkeskrin was nominated in 2021 for the Nordic Council Literature Prize. In 2020, she received the Søren Gyldendal Prize for Fiction.

Her works Det 3. årtusindes hjerte, Udgående Fartøj, and Mit smykkeskrin have been translated into English under the titles Third-Millennium Heart, Outgoing Vessel, and My Jewel Box, respectively, by Katrine Øgaard Jensen. Third-Millennium Heart won the 2018 National Translation Award for Poetry. Outgoing Vessel was published in March 2021, followed by My Jewel Box in March 2022. A collaborative work of translation and mistranslation by Jensen, featuring Olsen's work alongside that of other poets, is due out in 2025 under the title Ancient Algorithms.

As a poet, Olsen is considered part of the ecopoetry and ecofeminist movements.

In 2013, she became the editor of the journal Critique. From 2019 to 2023 she served as the director of the Forfatterskolen, a literary school she attended 20 years earlier, after having served in an acting capacity since the previous year.

=== Other projects ===
Olsen has also written one novel, Krisehæfterne: Pandora Blue Box, Atlantissyndromet, which was published in 2017.

Her work also includes several theatrical pieces, as well as libretti for operas. Among her libretti are those for Pelle Gudmundsen-Holmgreen's Sol går op, sol går ned and Peter Bruun's Miki Alone, the latter of which received the 2008 Nordic Council Music Prize.

== Selected works ==
=== Poetry ===
- Lulus sange og taler, 2000
- Atlas over huller i verden, 2003 (poetry and prose)
- Ægteskabet mellem vejen og udvejen, 2005
- Skønheden hænger på træerne, 2006
- Havet er en scene, 2008
- Have og helvede, 2010
- SAMLET, 2011 (poems written from 2000–2010)
- Det 3. årtusindes hjerte, 2012
- Den bedste af alle verdener, 2014
- Udgående fartøj, 2015
- Vi rus salve, 2016
- Mit smykkeskrin, 2020
- Morgenkåber, 2021

=== Novel ===
- Krisehæfterne: Pandora Blue Box, Atlantissyndromet, 2017

=== English translations ===
- Third-Millennium Heart (2017)
- Outgoing Vessel (2021)
- My Jewel Box (2022)
