= Baby (Thorup novel) =

1973 novel by Kirsten Thorup

- First edition
- Author: Kirsten Thorup
- Translator: Nadia Christensen
- Publisher: Gyldendal
- Publication date: 1973
- Publication place: Denmark

Baby is a 1973 novel by Danish author Kirsten Thorup. It deals with the disadvantaged members of society, those who have failed to make a mark.

The novel traces the movements of a selection of losers as they leave a cheap Copenhagen nightclub. There is Mark, a car salesman heavily in debt who ultimately separates from his pretty wife, Suzie who goes off to Sweden on a drunken escape, Leni who translates porno rather than the book she would like to complete, and many others. The losers are contrasted with Eddy, a loan shark, who causes increasing distress among his clients.

The overall message seems to be that nothing really matters, everything is reduced to the same low common denominator. The book is written in a simple style that is easy to read—whether as a novel or as an ambitious experiment.

The novel was awarded the Pegasus Prize for Literature in 1979.
