= Faklen =

- Categories: Political magazine
- First issue: 1996
- Final issue: 2011
- Country: Denmark
- Based in: Copenhagen
- Language: Danish

Faklen (English: The Torch) was a Danish language intellectual magazine, debating humanism, contemporary Danish politics, education, and philosophical themes. The magazine was based in Copenhagen, Denmark.

== History ==
The magazine was founded in 1996 by editor-in-chief Rune Engelbreth Larsen and a group of students from Danish universities in close cooperation with Danish author and philosopher Erwin Neutzsky-Wulff. Neutzsky-Wulff provided much of the material from the founding until his break with the magazine in 1999. the magazine was published by the students of the universities of Aarhus and Copenhagen. It covered news on cultural trends and social comment in Denmark. The topics emphasized included discrimination, racism, civil rights, forced labour, arbitrary solitary confinement and religious freedom.

From 1996 to 2001 Faklen was a print magazine. In 2002 it became an online-only magazine, a format it continued with until 2011 when the magazine was discontinued.

== See also ==
- List of magazines in Denmark
