= Erwin Neutzsky-Wulff =

Danish author and philosopher (born 1949)

Erwin Neutzsky-Wulff (born 24 November 1949) is a Danish science fiction, science, horror, prose and non-fiction author and philosopher. He is the son of Aage Neutzsky-Wulff (1891–1967) and half-brother to Vita Andersen.

Neutzsky-Wulff attended courses in philosophy at the University of Copenhagen, but abandoned his studies after his first year. Having lived in Copenhagen all of his life, he moved into an abandoned school in Vinstrup north of Randers with his wife, where he presently spends his time expanding his authorship. He occasionally holds courses on themes drawn from extensive interests.

== Works ==
Neutzsky-Wulff has written in both fiction and non-fiction, on a variety of subjects such as history, philosophy, cognition, religion, the occult, psychology and horror fiction. He is also the author to computer programming books during the 1980s.

In his earliest published literature, Erwin Neutzsky-Wulff builds up his own literary universe. The Dialog om det 21. århundredes to vigtigste verdenssystemer, (1971), is a philosophical dialogue modelled on the classical style of Galileo Galilei's Dialogue Concerning the Two Chief World Systems. The plot is set in a not too distant future, where a Danish civil war has broken out. The reader is witnessing a debate between three persons, one representing a new humanistic view on mankind and its new ideology (or anti-ideology), called Wulffianism. Wulffianism is anarchic in the word's real sense, entailing an acceptance of violence as a means and denial of modern civilization, resulting in public controversy. Other books from this early period are anthologies of essays and poems, and mainly appear as supplements to the dialogues. All of Neutzsky-Wulff's poetry is in rhyme, metrical with the subtle use of pastiche.

With his 1972 episodic novel Adam Harts Opdagelser (English: The Discoveries of Adam Hart), Neutzsky-Wulff began to consolidate his style and built his reader base. The book's protagonists are Adam Hart and his partner Victor Janis, both working as "occult detectives". Neutzsky-Wulff himself makes an appearance within a more secondary role. The series continued in 1977 with the episodic Adam Hart og sjælemaskinen (English: Adam Hart and the Soulmachine), and Victor Janis og søn (Victor Janis and Son), both representing a more conventional novel structure, ending with an experimental novel, Oiufael (1977), primarily written in verse. An episode from Adam Hart og sjælemaskinen was adapted as the short film Adam Hart i Sahara (1990), based on his own screenplay.

Occasionally departing from the traditional conventions of the genre, Neutzsky-Wulff sees himself as an author of science fiction. He emphasizes the genre as the most prominent stage of artistic interpretations of the mythology of our time. Anno Domini (1975) tells the story of an astronaut on a strange planet, experiencing a macrohistorical version of the evolution of humankind. In Gud (1976, English: God), the classical form of science fiction itself, is challenged: A group of people are, by means of an alien vessel, heading towards the planet of God. With Den 33. marts (1977, English: The 33rd of March), the plot is altered from outer to "inner space", a platform resembling that of American science fiction author Philip K. Dick. A person living in the 1970s Copenhagen discovers effects of society as mere stage equipment. Library books are empty and he is trapped within city borders. In a sanitarium, this person "hallucinates" about another world where he features as an awaited Messiah. His 1978 novel, Havet (English: The Ocean), is again about space travel. The supernatural setting pivots around the cards of Tarok. In Menneske (1982, English: Man), a computer independently achieves consciousness and sets out to discovering out what existing as a human being is like. Consequently, it embarks on a Stone Age odyssey, following the history of man, ending in a parody of 1970s Denmark.

=== Demons and computers ===
Erwin Neutzsky-Wulff describes by novel form esoteric initiation and demonic possession in Indsigtens sted (1980, English: The Place of Insight). The narration is set through a schoolteacher's diary experiencing an increasing interest in the occult. This horror story distinguishes itself from his other books. For Neutzsky-Wulff, the eighties were to stand under the parole of prose. Neutzsky-Wulff had taught himself computer programming and when the first home computers entered the market, he published an introductory manual, Mikrodatamaten – Programmering og anvendelse (1982), followed by several similar guides in the following years at a time when computer programming was still seen as an intellectual pursuit in a rather anti-intellectual climate.

His prosaic studies of the supernatural followed with Okkultisme (1985, Occultism) and Magi (1986, Magic). Okkultisme raises its groundwork from epistemology, modern physics and neurology, as well as interpretations of visionary lyrics, such as those produced by William Blake. The book's second part gives an historical briefing on the history of religions, from tribal religion through Judaism and Christianity, to Satanism. "Satanism" is partly used in Neutzsky-Wulff's works as a common denominator of a specific group, and partly as a philosophical term for modern society's guiding ideology. This ideology is classed as anti-Christian.

Magi treats themes such as the supernatural, its practice, supernatural experiences and citizens of the world beyond ours. Our present day civilization is depicted evil to an extent that hatred is given as the primary human condition (p. 222). Magi was followed by Oprindelse (1988, Origin), the first and only volume of an abortive world history, covering a time line from the Big Bang until ca. 2700 BC.

Faust, (1989) resembles, by structure and form, to a certain point the earlier "Den 33. marts". Neutzsky-Wulff's modern Faust is not a theologian, but rather a psychoanalyst who defies his discipline. On 20 August 1989, Erwin Neutzsky-Wulff preached at Hellig Kors Kirke, a church in central Copenhagen, declaring that Christianity had come to an end.

=== Brick novels ===
In Neutzsky-Wulff's authorship the traditional novel form now appears to be cracking, as his novels grow in size and are thoroughly embedded with several subplots parallel to the main story. Furthermore, they attain a more objective form and prosaic essence, which provides his ontological platform with deeper insights. Also the author himself becomes omnipresent, frequently either commenting on fictional actions or directly addressing the reader. 2000 (1991) is a science fictional Decameron, where a handful of persons are isolated and share information between themselves. Around them, civilization deteriorates and a brand new kind of human is born. In the epic Verden (1994, The World), Neutzsky-Wulff includes time travels and similar phenomena, as he tries to delete Christ from history. Døden (1996, Death), distinguishes itself from other novels by its political main theme, especially the 1990s' emerging chauvinist and neofascist tendencies. This novel attracted public spotlights, as the dissolution of the journal Faklen caused a public dispute between its editors. Neutzsky-Wulff himself added yet another creation to his authorship with UFO (1999). UFO enhances his science fiction-novels of the 70s by reviewing the occult and mythological foundations of the UFO-phenomenon. In between his novel writing, Neutzsky-Wulff translated Genesis, which was published as For længe siden (2000, A Long Time Ago). In his Abattoir (2003, Slaughterhouse), he returns to his lighter style, reminiscent of the Adam Hart series.

=== A modern grimoire ===
Transcendent ambitions forge the massive arguments appearing in Rum (2001, Room), his greatest fictional work to date, and the prose work Det overnaturlige (2004, The Supernatural) expounding on the essence and forms of religious experience and reality itself, treating much the same topics as the earlier Okkultisme and Magi, only now in much more depth. These parallel works fulfil these ambitions fully from two different holds.

Rum is illustrated with a deliberate "bad taste" by Jørgen Bitsch. The plot is set in separated rooms: A girl selling herself as a sex slave, a man in a bunker after a nuclear war, an expedition to an alien planet, a haunted house investigator and finally, a poet not knowing he is an inspirational source for a mass murderer. These rooms can be thought of as interlinked: They are books read by the man in the bunker or visions seen by the slave girl etc. Neutzsky-Wulff and his wife also appear. Later, the characters exchange locations. Reality constrains itself to self-created rooms and the apparently incoherent action is deliberately supposed to influence the reader to assume a magical way of thinking. It is an abyssal book, hardly fully comprehensible by any but a few.

The prose Det overnaturlige, more or less exactly like Okkultisme and Magi, is at the same time meant to displace them by writing a modern grimoire. It is information-dense, cut to the bone and indirectly demands that the reader study a number of texts only referred to in the book to properly understand it. The book describes the mystic initiation, a radical practice requiring women to be sexually enslaved (as in Rum), whereas men have to undergo a kind of virtual castration. Themes as diverse as kabbalah, the mystic traditions of the Holy Grail, Gnosticism, fairy tales, Mozart's The Magic Flute and Wagner are treated in depth.

=== Critique ===
Neutzsky-Wulff's books differ from most contemporary Danish literature, reading at times like texts of a strange, foreign religion.

== Bibliography ==
=== Novels and short stories ===
- Dialog om det enogtyvende århundredes to vigtigste verdenssystemer (1971, 2. ed. 1972)
- Adam Harts opdagelser (1972, republished 2003)
- Anno Domini (1975, republished 2000)
- Gud (1976) republished (1995)
- Adam Hart og sjælemaskinen (1977)
- Victor Janis & Søn (1977)
- Oiufael (1977)
- Den 33. marts (1977)
- Havet (1978, 1996)
- Indsigtens sted (1978) (1996)
- Menneske (1982)
- Ulvens arv og andre noveller (1984)
- Faust (1989)
- 2000 (1991)
- Skrækkens ABC. Noveller for børn (1992)
- Verden (1994)
- Døden (1996)
- UFO (1999)
- Rum : (2001)
- Abattoir (2003)
- Hjernen (2007)
- Adam Hart (2007)
- Menneskets afvikling (2009)
- 9999 (2010)
- Jack the Ripper (2012)

=== Prose (selected) ===
- Mikrodatamaten, programmering og anvendelse: en bog om ZX81 BASIC (1984)
- Okkultisme (1985)
- Programmering med COMMODORE BASIC (1985)
- Amstrad BASIC (1985)
- Magi (1986)
- BASIC med COMMODORE 64 (1986)
- Comal 80 og Piccoline (1986)
- Verdens historie. 1: Oprindelse 1988
- Postscript-programmering (1990)
- For længe siden: Første Mosebog i nyoversættelse (2000)
- Det overnaturlige (2004)
- Menneskets afvikling (2009)
- Biblen: Non-fiction (2011)
- Religion (2015)

=== On Neutzsky-Wulff's authorship ===
- Engelbreth Larsen, Rune: Forsvar for verden (1994, English: Defense for the World)
- Jørgensen, Stig W.: Erwin Neutzsky-Wulff, en introduktion. (Bibliografi af Listemageren) (1995)
- Asger Harlung, Henrik Isaksen, Frank Brahe (ed.): Samtaler med Erwin Neutzsky-Wulff (2004)

== See also ==
- Anders Westenholz
- Grimoire
