= Harald Voetmann =

Danish author and translator (born 1978)

Harald Voetmann Christiansen (born 1978), known as Harald Voetmann, is a Danish author and translator. He grew up in Birkerød, the youngest of four brothers. He graduated from the Forfatterskolen writing school in 1999. He also studied Latin at the University of Copenhagen. From 2006, he was co-editor of the journal Ildfisken.

== Selected bibliography ==
- Kapricer (2000)
- Autoharuspeksi (2002)
- Teutoburger (2005)
- En alt andet end proper tilstand (2008)
- Vågen (2010). Awake, trans. Johanne Sorgenfri Ottosen (New Directions, 2021)
- Kødet letter (2012)
- Alt under månen (2014). Sublunar, trans. Johanne Sorgenfri Ottosen (New Directions, 2023)
- Syner og fristelser (2015). Visions and Temptations, trans. Johanne Sorgenfri Ottosen (New Directions, 2025)
- Sulpicia: en romersk digter (2016)
- Tingtale (2017)
- Amduat. En iltmaskine (2018)
- Parasitbreve (2022)
- Hetærebreve (2022)

=== Translations ===
- Pliny the Elder: Om mennesker og dyr (2008)
- Petronius: Satyricon (2009)
- Juvenal: Vreden skriver digtet (2020)

== Awards and honours ==
- 2011: Nominated for the Nordic Council Literature Prize for Vågen
- 2014: Danish Critics Prize for Literature for Alt under månen
- 2014: Otto Gelsted Prize
- 2023: Frit Flet-prisen
