= Mette Winge =

Danish literary critic (1937–2022)

Mette Winge (5 January 1937 – 15 April 2022, Copenhagen) was a Danish writer, literary critic and director of cultural radio broadcasting at Danmarks Radio. She made her debut as a writer in 1988 with the novel Skrivejomfruen based on the life of the 18th-century Danish author Charlotta Dorothea Biehl. It was the first of many widely read historical novels and detective stories.

== Early life, education and family ==
Winge was born on 5 January 1937 in the Copenhagen district of Frederiksberg, the daughter of the dental technician Hugo Hagen (1903–91) and Grethe Marie Wilton (1913–95). After matriculating from Gentofte School in 1955, she first studied languages, taught for a period as a substitute teacher, studied librarianship at the Royal School of Library and Information Science graduating in 1960, and went on to study literary history at the University of Copenhagen, earning a master's degree in 1965. In October 1962, she married Peter Winge, with whom she had two children: Ulrik (1965) and Kristian (1967).

== Career ==
On graduating, she worked as a lecturer in literary history at the library school and in parallel became a literary reviewer at Berlingske Tidende as well as a reviewer at Politiken. In the 1980s, she also held managerial positions in connection with literature and theatre at Danmarks Radio, after which she devoted her time to writing.

She became increasingly involved in literary criticism, publishing Kritikhistorie – en antologi (History of Criticism - an Anthology) in 1972. She then turned to children's literature, pioneering its inclusion in literary research supported by a number of publications in the early 1990s.

As a novelist, she made a successful debut with Skriverjomfruen in 1988 about the 18th-century writer Charlotta Dorothea Biehl which was later dramatized. She went on to write several detective stories including Novemberlys (1990), Sandflugt (1991), Den femte vinter (1993) and Grønt mørke (1994). More recently, she wrote stage plays, children's books and more novels.
