= Søren Ulrik Thomsen =

Danish poet (born 1956)

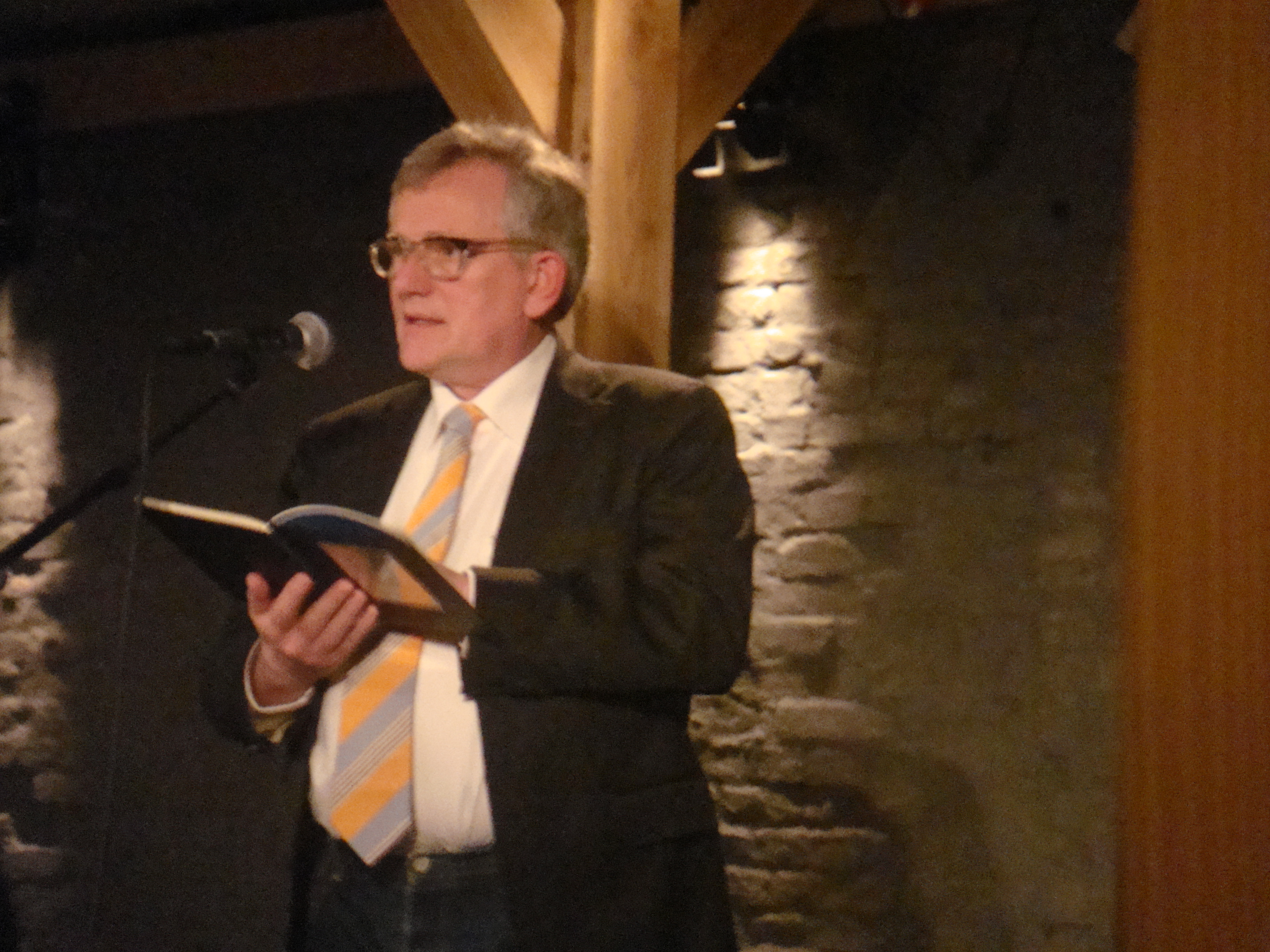
Søren Ulrik Thomsen

Søren Ulrik Thomsen (born 8 May 1956) is a Danish poet. His debut was City Slang, 1981.

== Life ==
Søren Ulrik Thomsen was born in 1956 in Kalundborg. He grew up in Store Heddinge, Stevns, south of Copenhagen, where he went to school together with another Danish poet, Jens Fink-Jensen from 1968 to 1972. During his childhood he often heard readings of literature and sang evening songs. This early exposure to the rhythm and poetry of language influenced his later writing. In school he became familiar with the songs of B.S.Ingemann, a poet who has had significant influence on Thomsen's poetry.

He moved with his family to Copenhagen at sixteen and enrolled in secondary school at Rysensteen and, after being expelled, at Det Frie Gymnasium, where he completed his upper secondary education, making him eligible for university studies. His encounter with Copenhagen influenced his early poetry, and was reflected in themes such as the strangeness and loneliness of the big city.

Søren Ulrik Thomsen studied comparative literature at the University of Copenhagen, but prioritized writing poetry rather than completing his degree. His debut was in the review Hvedekorn (Wheatgrain) in 1977.

== Publishing and style ==
His first collection of poetry was City Slang (1981; this and other links to years are to the corresponding "[year]-in-poetry" articles). It is poetry about human alienation in a city. In 1984, the Danish singer Lars H.U.G. scored these poems on an album of the same title, expanding Thomsen's audience.

Thomsen's collections of poetry City Slang, Ukendt under den samme måne ("Unknown Under the Same Moon"; 1982) and New poems (1987) belonged to the group of 80s poets who were reacting against the political poets of the seventies. The 80s poets, which included Michael Strunge, was focused on the body, sensations, and existential subjects in a tight, minimalistic language.

Later Thomsen published Hjemfalden (1991), Det skabtes vaklen ("The Shaking of Creation", 1996) and Det værste og det bedste, illustrated by Ib Spang Olsen, (2002). With these collections he moved away from the school 80s poets and establishes himself as a poet with a truly individual expression.

Søren Ulrik Thomsen is interested in great existential human conditions such as death and loneliness, creation and destruction. His poems in Hjemfalden are rhythmic arabesques, which comes through strongly in his public readings.

He has also published two poetics, where he tries to define the essence of poetry and what happens in the process of creating a poem, Mit lys brænder. Omrids af en ny poetik ("In My Candle Burns: Outline of a New Poetics", 1985) and En dans på gloser, essays ("Dancing Attendance on the Word," 1996).

As a writer, Søren Ulrik Thomsen participates in public debate and published a book of essays with Frederik Stjernfeldt, Kritik af den negative opbyggelighed. His work has been the subject of books and essays, and he is a contemporary Danish poet. A conference was devoted to his work as a living Danish writer in 2009.

Søren Ulrik Thomsen's poetry has been translated in the book Selected Poetry, based on poems from Hjemfalden and Det skabtes vaklen.

== Awards ==
- 1985 – Otto Gelsted Prize
- 2015 – Søren Gyldendal Prize
- 2025 – Swedish Academy Nordic Prize
