= Inge Eriksen =

Danish writer and political activist

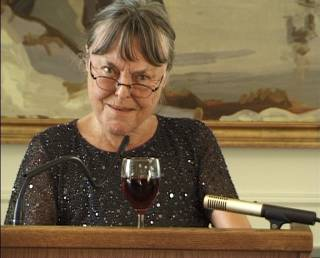
- Eriksen in 2002
- Born: Inge Marie Eriksen; 22 October 1935; Skørping, Denmark
- Died: 13 March 2015 (aged 79); Aalborg, Denmark
- Occupation(s): Writer; Political activist
- Years active: 1960s–2009

Inge Marie Eriksen (22 October 1935 – 13 March 2015) was a Danish writer and political activist. She became involved in Danish public debate in the 1960s and helped to the left-wing Left Socialists political party establish that she left in 1969. Eriksen began her writing career in 1975 and won various awards for her work from her first book that was published in 1975 and her final one in 2009. Her works include novels such as the science fiction series Rummet uden tid, 1–4 and Sommerfugelens vinge.

== Early life and education ==
Eriksen was born in Skørping, Denmark on 22 October 1935. She was the daughter of the Norwegian railway official Erik Eriksen and the nurse Nanna Henriette Jungersen. Eriksen spent her early childhood in Southern Jutland, before she, her brother and mother relocated to Ålborg upon the death of her father in a German concentration camp in 1945. In 1957, she became a student of Aalborg Studenterkursus and then read comparative literature at Aarhus University until 1962 when she moved to Copenhagen. Eriksen became a teacher in the Gladsakse primary school from 1973 to 1975 after earning a degree at Copenhagen Day and Evening Seminary until she became a full-time writer. She had also worked at a newspaper employee and in a hotel, organic farming, antique shop, dairy and at a city nursery.

== Career ==
She became involved in public debate in the 1960s. Eriksen helped to establish the left-wing Left Socialists political party in 1967 and became a member of its primary board in mid-1968 before being employed in its office that same year. In 1969, she resigned from the party, due to the Leninist influence in the party and ceased left-wing political activism in 1972. Eriksen's first book, the gender-political work Kællinger i Danmark, co-written with the film director and painter Jytte Rex was published in 1975 after the two held the Drømmen og den rasende latte exhibition the previous year. The following year, she authored the two-volume novel Victoria og verdensrevolutionen. This was followed by Eriksen's next novel Fugletræet about the contemporary division of love and work in 1979, and made her debut as a playwright with the futuristic horror Vinden er ikke til salg a year later.

In 1981, she published the historical novel Silkehavet about the bourgeois revolution. Eriksen wrote the science fiction series Rummet uden tid, 1–4 that includes the books Luderen fra Gomorra (1983), Nord for tiden in 1985, Dinosaurernes morgen in 1986 and Paradismaskinen in 1989, which were published between 1983 and 1989. In 1992, she wrote the social novel Hjertets fifth kammer, and Hertuginden three years later; both novels were focused on people who lived through the Second World War and hoping to continue her livelihoods. Eriksen went on to author the novel series Sommerfugelens vinge from 1997 to 2001 that provided a contemporary historical analysis of the social development of the people of Europe at the conclusion of the 1990s. These books were Tørvegraverne in 1997, De rumænske bøfler in 1999 and Vinterhaven in 2001. She went on to publish the political-psychological novel realism novel Citrontræet in 2003, the social realism novel En kvinde med hat in 2005, and Blues for en lyserød sko in 2007. Eriksen wrote her memoirs Brød og roser in 2009, and she also worked as a freelance writer and magazine editor. She was a member of the Social Democrats from the late 1980s, and died in Aalborg, Denmark on 13 March 2015.

== Awards ==
Eriksen was the recipient of several literature awards. In 1976, she was awarded the Otto Benzons Prize, the SFC Prize in 1986, the Adam Oehlenschläger-Legatet in 1987, the Georg Brandes Award in 1994, HK's Kunstnerpris in 1996, the Martin Andersen Nexø Prize in 1999 and the Otto Gelsted Prize in 2001.
