= Julia Butschkow =

Danish writer

- Born: 21 December 1978 (age 47)
- Occupations: writer, playwright and poet

Julia Butschkow (born 21 December 1978) is a Danish writer, playwright and poet, educated at Forfatterskolen 2001. She has written the play Sidespor, performed in Malmö and Copenhagen.

== Bibliography ==
- Aber dabei, Samleren, 2013 (Novel)
- Der er ingen bjerge i Danmark, Samleren, 2011 (Short stories)
- Apropos Opa, Samleren, 2009 (Novel)
- Lunatia, Samleren, 2004 (Novel)
- Så simpelt, Samleren, 1999 (Short stories)
- Lykkekomplex, Facet, 1997 (Poems)

== Prizes and recognition ==
- Statens Kunstfonds three-year grant 2005
- Honour grant Rosinante og Co 2007
