= Vita Andersen =

Danish author (1944–2021)

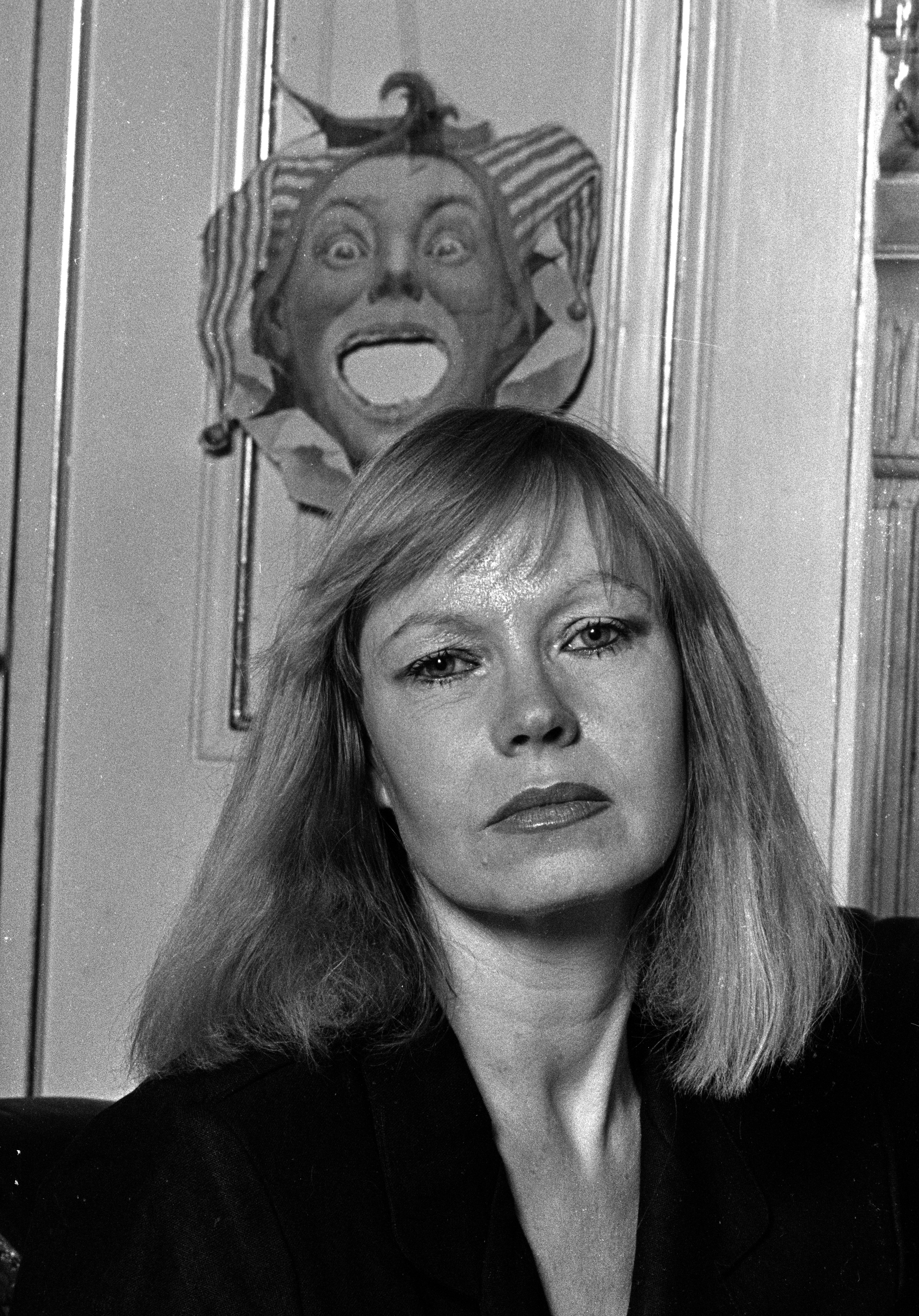
- Vita Andersen, 1991.
- Born: 29 October 1942
- Died: 20 July 2021 (aged 78)
- Occupations: Poet, novelist, playwright and children's writer
- Spouse: Mogens Camre
- Father: Aage Neutzsky-Wulff
- Relatives: Erwin Neutzsky-Wulff (half brother)
- Awards: De Gyldne Laurbær (1979); Danish Critics Prize for Literature (1987); Søren Gyldendal Prize (1991)

Vita Andersen (29 October 1942 – 20 July 2021) was a Danish poet, novelist, playwright and children's writer.

== Career ==
Andersen made her literary debut in 1977 with the poetry collection Tryghedsnarkomaner, which is among the most sold poetry collections in Denmark.

Further publications include the short story collection Hold kæft og vær smuk (1978), the plays Elsk mig (1980) and Kannibalerne (1982), the novel Hva'for en hånd vil du ha (1987), and the children's books Petruskas laksko (1989) and Coco (1997).

She was awarded De Gyldne Laurbær in 1979, the Danish Critics Prize for Literature in 1987, and the Søren Gyldendal Prize in 1991. Her novel Indigo from 2017 was nominated for the Nordic Council Literature Prize.

== Personal life ==
Andersen was born on 29 October 1942, a daughter of author Aage Neutzsky-Wulff. She was a half sister to Erwin Neutzsky-Wulff.

== Death ==
Andersen died on 20 July 2021.
