= Asta Olivia Nordenhof =

Danish poet and novelist

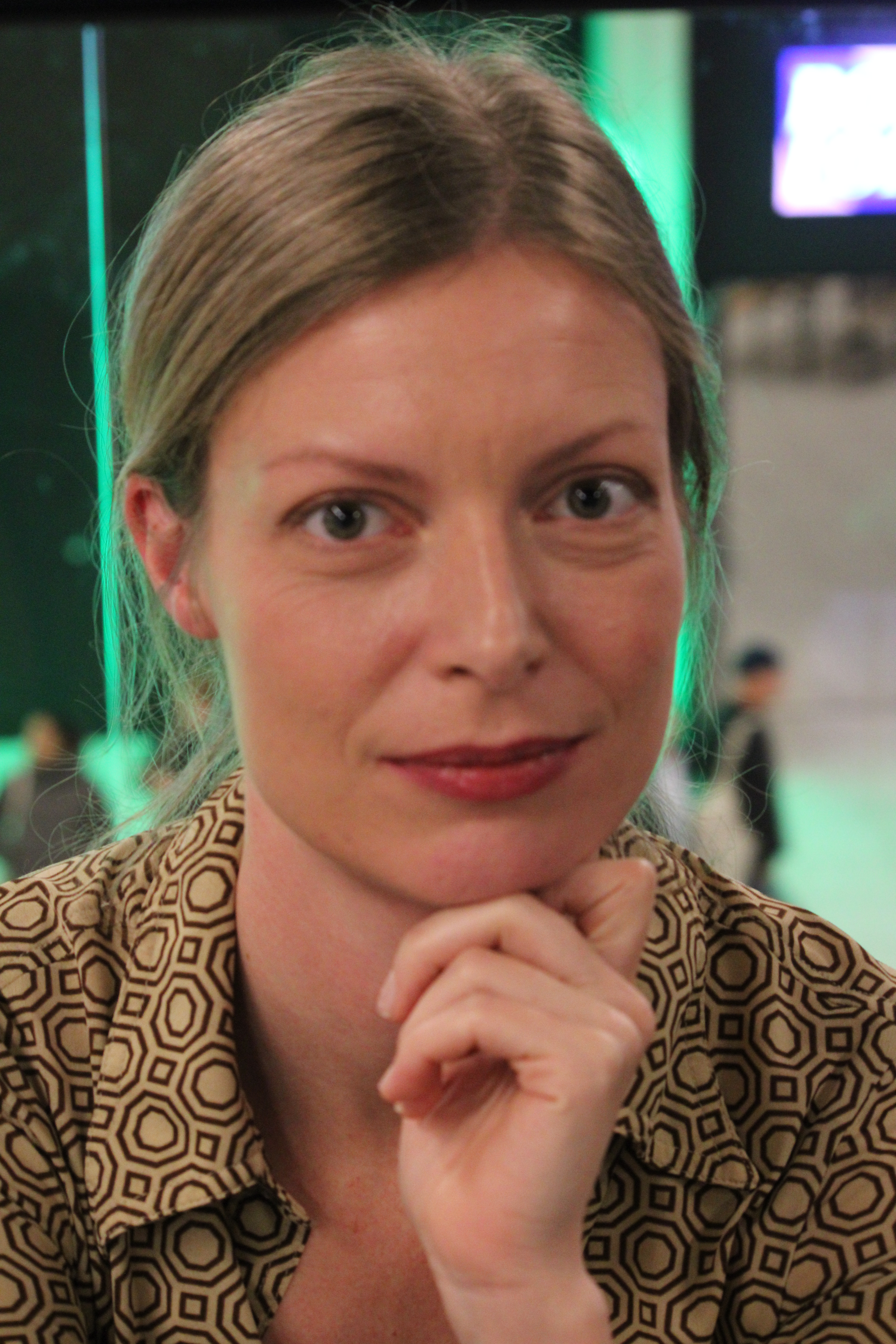
- Nordenhof in 2025
- Born: 1988 (age 37–38)
- Occupations: Poet, Author
- Awards: PO Enquist Prize 2020, European Union for Literature Prize 2020

Asta Olivia Nordenhof (born 28 January 1988) is a Danish poet and novelist. She studied at the Danish Academy of Creative Writing, where she was teaching 2015–2022.

Nordenhof published her debut novel Et ansigt til Emily (A Face for Emily) in 2011, a patchwork- novel about the love between two women which won the Munch-Christensen’s Debutant Prize.

In 2013, she published her critically acclaimed poetry collection Det nemme og det ensomme (The Easiness and the Loneliness) which won Montanas Literary Award that same year. Det nemme og det ensomme has been translated to Norwegian, Swedish (published by Modernista) and English (published by Open Letter Books).

In 2020, she published her novel Penge på lommen (Money to Burn), the first part in septology entitled Scandinavian Star. The series takes its name from the MS Scandinavian Star, a passenger ferry that was set on fire on April 6, 1990, killing 159 people.

Since publication, Penge på lommen has been sold to 8 territories and has won several awards, most notably the P.O. Enquist Prize in 2020 and the EU Prize for Literature. In 2021, Penge på lommen was nominated for the Nordic Council Literature Prize 2021.

The second volume of the septology, Djævlebogen (The Devil Book), was published in Danish in 2023, and the English translation in 2025.

== Bibliography ==
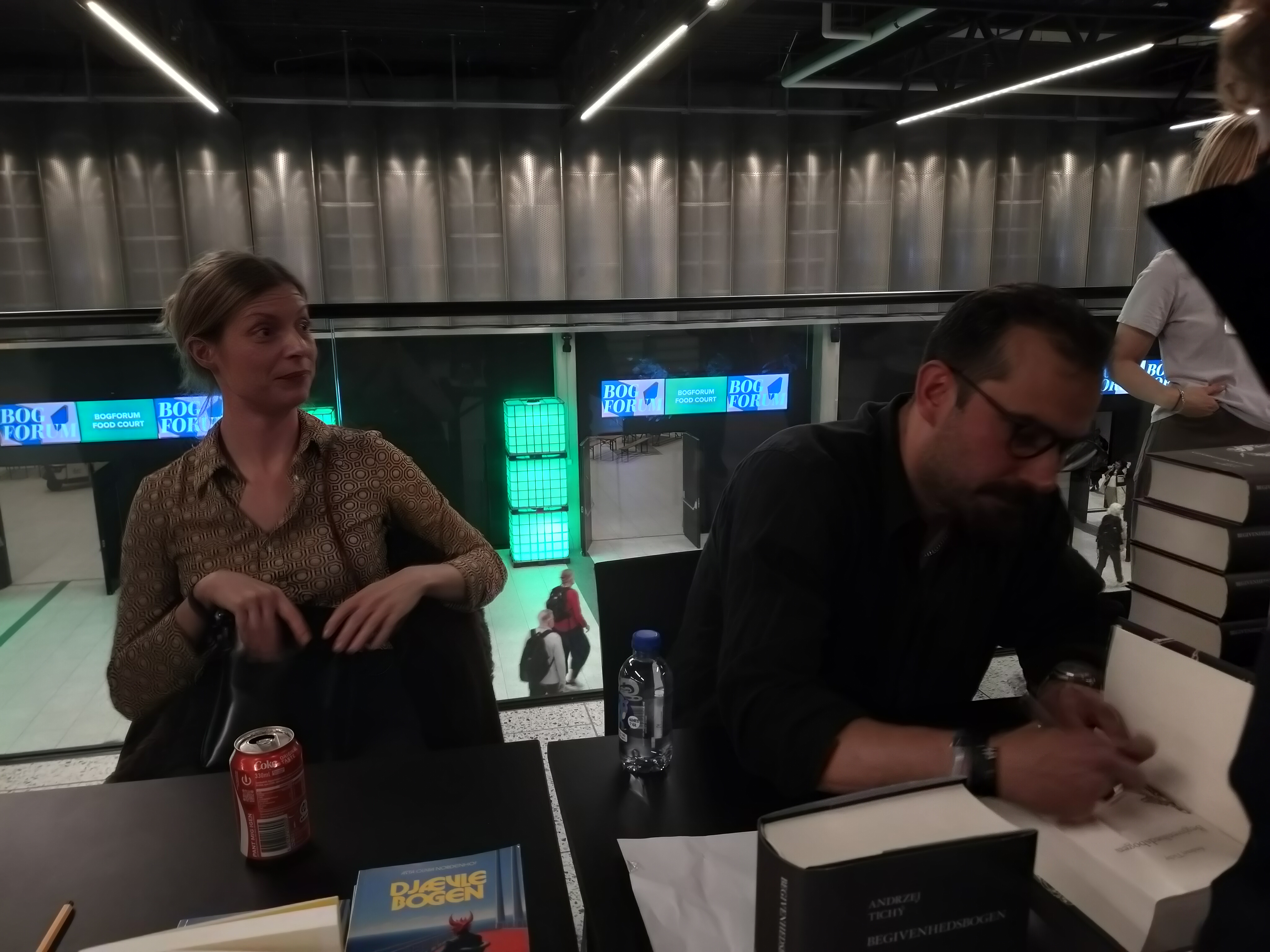
Nordenhof signing books with Andrzej Tichý at Bogforum 2025

=== Novels ===
- Et ansigt til Emily (2011, "A Face for Emily, Basilisk")
- Scandinavian Star del 1. — Penge på lommen (2020, "Money to Burn")
- Scandinavian Star del 2. — Djævlebogen (2023, "The Devil Book")

=== Poetry ===
- Det nemme og det ensomme (2013, "The Easiness and the Loneliness")
