= Jens Fink-Jensen =

Danish writer, photographer, composer and architect (born 1956)

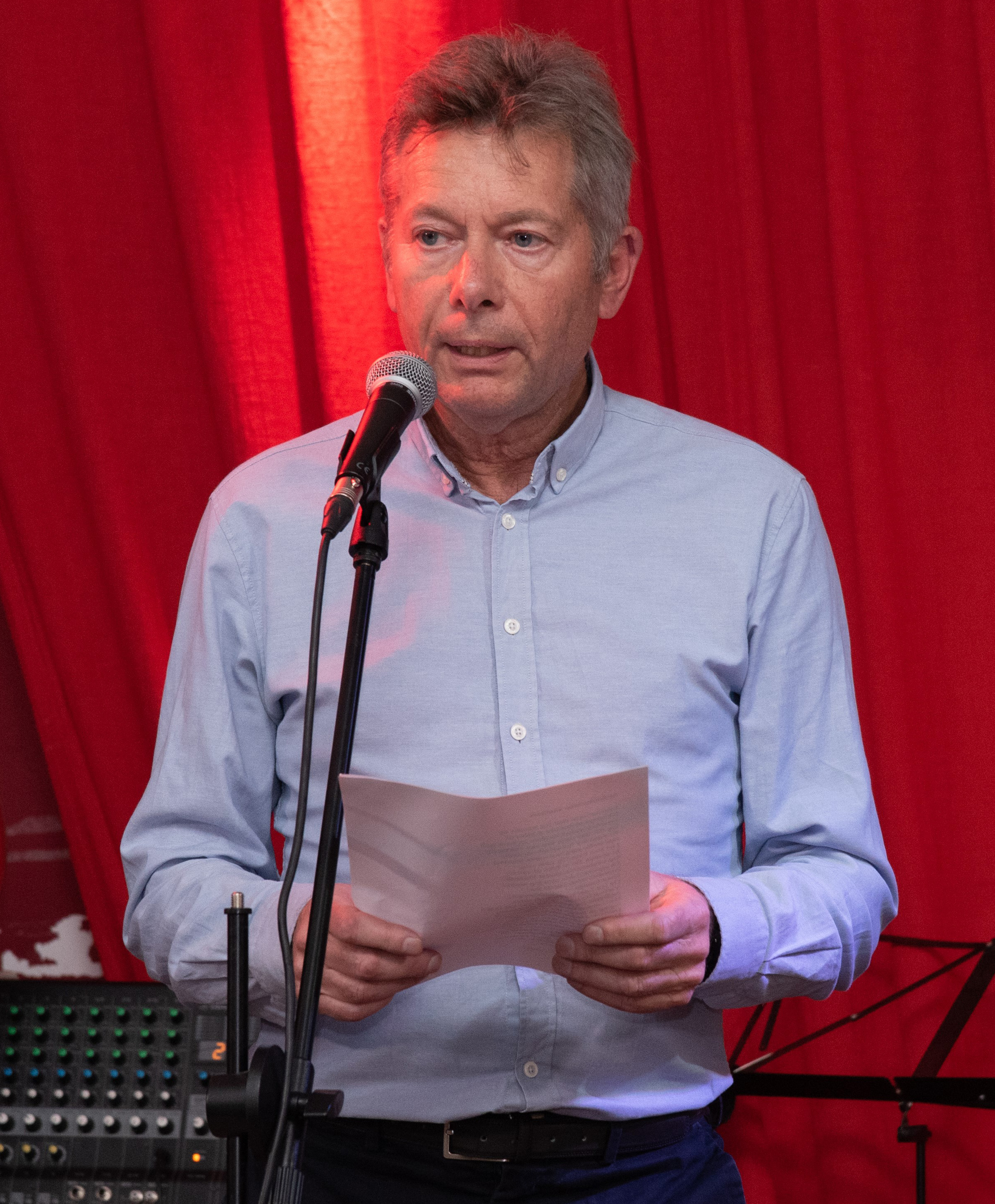
- Jens Fink-Jensen performing at the Ideogramma International Literature Festival in Nicosia, Cyprus, 27 November 2019.
- Born: 19 December 1956 (age 69); Copenhagen, Denmark
- Occupation: Writer
- Relatives: Morten Fink-Jensen (brother)
- Writing career
- Genres: Poetry; Short story Children's literature Travel
- Website: www.jensfink.com

Jens Fink-Jensen (born 19 December 1956) is a Danish poet, author, photographer, composer and architect.

== Biography ==
Fink-Jensen was born in Copenhagen, Denmark. From 1968 to 1972 he attended school in Store Heddinge where he was a classmate with the Danish poet Søren Ulrik Thomsen. Fink-Jensen debuted as a writer at the age of 18 when his short story, Juni 1995 (June 1995), was published in the daily newspaper Information. The following year, four of his poems were published in the Danish literary magazine Hvedekorn. Fink-Jensen graduated in modern languages from Herlufsholm Boarding School in 1976 and subsequently performed his national service with the Royal Life Guard where he trained as an NCO. He later earned a degree in architecture in 1986 from the Royal Danish Academy of Fine Arts, School of Architecture in Copenhagen and a further education in multimedia design from the same Academy in 1997.

During the early 1980s, Fink-Jensen was part of a circle of young Danish poets which included Thomsen, Michael Strunge and the editor of Hvedekorn, Poul Borum. In October 1980, he helped arrange the NÅ!!80 festival, a two-day art festival in Copenhagen that combined art, concerts, and poetry readings, and sought to introduce Denmark to what was called the "Nå" generation.

Fink-Jensen published his first collection of poems, titled Verden i et øje (The World in an Eye), in 1981. He followed with two more books of poetry, and then in 1986, he published the collection of short stories Bæsterne (The Beasts). He has also written three children's books in collaboration with the Danish illustrator Mads Stage: Jonas og konkylien (Jonas and the Conch Shell), Jonas og himmelteltet (Jonas and the Sky Tent) and Jonas og engletræet (Jonas and the Angel Tree). Jonas and the Sky Tent, which relates the story of a young boy's fantastic experiences in a magical circus bigtop, has been described as Chagall-like poetry. In 2008 his travel book The West Coast of Europe - a photo travel from Skagen to Gibraltar was published.

== Performances ==
Jens Fink-Jensen performs at various venues such as music and literature festivals, high schools and libraries with his multimedia performance which combines poetry readings with music (synthesizer og saxophone) and slide show.

== Exhibitions ==
Jens Fink-Jensen has had photo exhibitions in Denmark, France, Norway and Sweden:

- Beijing Ansigt (Images of Beijing), with portraits of people and places in the Chinese capital, distributed in Denmark by Amnesty International.
- Sydens Skibe (Ships of the South), showing mostly small fishing-boats and related people and surroundings by the Mediterranean Sea, the Atlantic Coast of Europe and Morocco (displayed at museums in Denmark, Norway and Sweden).
- The West Coast of Europe - a photographic journey from Skagen to Gibraltar, since 2008 displayed in Denmark (Esbjerg), France (Dunkirk) and The Netherlands (Rotterdam).

== Paintings and poems ==
In 2012 Polish painter Kasia Banas started to work on a series of paintings inspired by Jens Fink-Jensen's poetry. Some of the paintings were for the first time put on display 4 May to 2 June in Olga Santos Gallery in Porto, Portugal. 10 May the main exhibition of the project opened in Galeria Miejska in Banas´ hometown Wrocław, consisting of her paintings and the poems in Danish and in Polish translation. Later in 2012 the exhibition was displayed at The Danish Cultural Institute in Warsaw.

== Publications ==
- Verden i et øje, (The World in An Eye), poetry, 1981
- Sorgrejser, (Travels in Sorrow), poetry, 1982
- Dans under galgen, (Dancing Under the Gallows), poetry, 1983
- Bæsterne, (The Beasts), short stories, 1986
- Nær afstanden, (Near The Distance), poetry, 1988
- Jonas og konkylien, (Jonas and the Conch Shell), children's book, 1994 (Illustrated by Mads Stage).
- Forvandlingshavet, (The Sea of Change), poetry, 1995
- Jonas og himmelteltet, (Jonas and the Sky Tent), children's book, 1998 (Illustrated by Mads Stage)
- Alt er en åbning, (Everything is an Opening), poetry, 2002
- Syd for mit hjerte. 100 udvalgte kærlighedsdigte (South of my Heart. 100 selected love poems), poetry, 2005
- The West Coast of Europe - a photographic journey from Skagen to Gibraltar, photo travel book, 2008
- Jonas og engletræet, (Jonas and the Angel Tree), children's book, 2010 (Illustrated by Mads Stage)

== Translations ==
In 1999, his collection of poems Nær afstanden (Near the Distance) was published in Arabic, translated by Jamal Jumá (Alwah publishers, Madrid). A few of the poems had previously been published in the daily “Al-Quds” (London, 1996) and the periodical “Nizwa” (Sultanate of Oman, 1999). Iranian born poet Sheema Kalbasi, now living in the United States, has translated poems by Jens Fink-Jensen into English and Persian. Jens Fink-Jensen's travel book The West Coast of Europe - a photographic journey from Skagen to Gibraltar was published in English in 2008. Chilean poet Omar Pérez Santiago has in 2009 translated poems by Jens Fink-Jensen into Spanish. Among others, Polish artist Kasia Banas in 2012 translated poems by Jens Fink-Jensen into Polish. In August 2012 a collection including 28 poems by Jens Fink-Jensen was published in Poland, among others translated by Jósef Jarosz.

== Honours ==
- Danish Arts Foundation, 1982.
- The Ministry of Culture's Commission for the Illustrated Danish Book, 1992.
- The Danish Literature Council, 1997 and 1998.
- The Danish Arts Council, 2007, 2008 and 2009.
