= Kim Leine =

Danish-Norwegian author

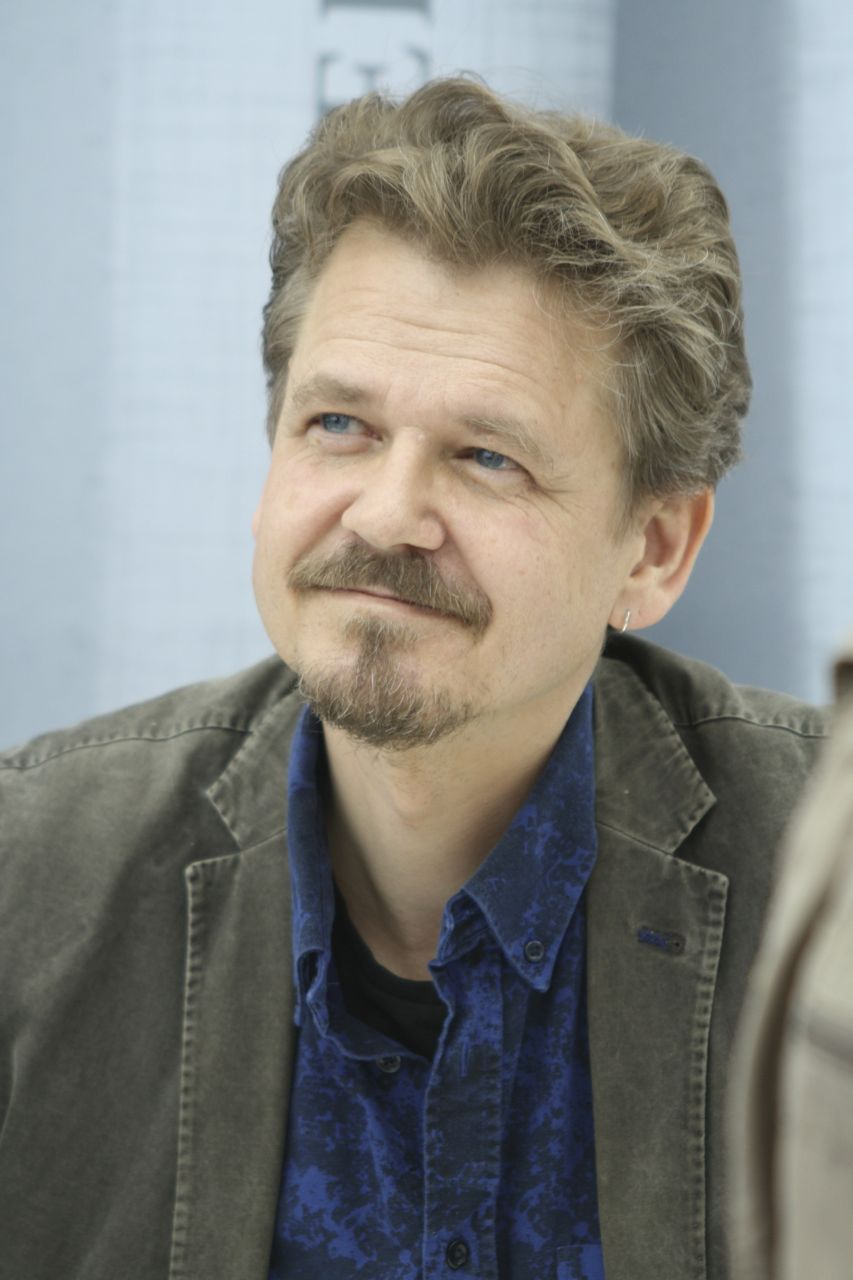
Kim Leine in Leipzig 2014

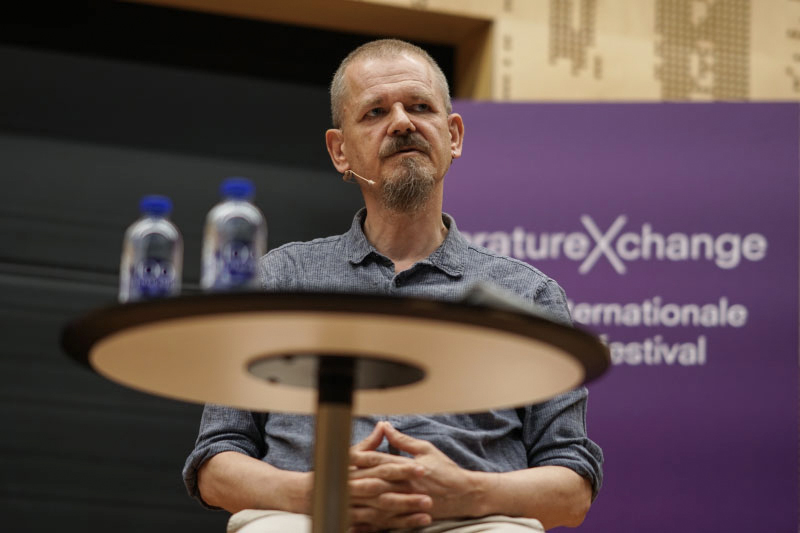
Kim Leine LiteratureXchange Aarhus 2021

Kim Leine Rasmussen (b. 28 August 1961 in Seljord Municipality, Telemark, Norway) is a Danish-Norwegian author who writes predominantly about Greenland.

His books have been translated into twenty languages and won several prestigious literary prizes. His novel The Prophets of Eternal Fjord won six literature prizes in 2012 and 2013.

== Personal life ==
He spent his childhood years in Seljord Municipality, Norway, where the family was characterized by their Jehovah's Witness faith. In 1978 he moved to Denmark, where he lived with his father for five years. He then trained as a nurse at Bispebjerg Nursing School in 1987. In 1989 he moved with his wife to Greenland, where they lived for 3 years in Nuuk and later in East Greenland and Langeland. In 2000 he was divorced and in 2004 he returned to Denmark. After reading and writing continuously since the age of 12, he made his debut at the age of 46 with the novel Kalak in 2007. He has two children from his first marriage in the 1980s and two from his current marriage.

== Bibliography ==
=== Novels ===
- Kalak (2007)
- Valdemarsdag (2008)
- Tunu (2009)
- Profeterne i Evighedsfjorden (2012); English translation: The Prophets of Eternal Fjord part 1 of the Greenlandic trilogy
- Afgrunden (2015)
- De søvnløse (2016)
- Rød mand/Sort mand (Gyldendal, 2018); English translation: The Colony of Good Hope (March 2022) part 2 of the Greenlandic trilogy
- Efter Åndemaneren (Gyldendal, 2021) part 3 of the Greenlandic trilogy
- Karolines Kamp 1 (2022)
- Karolines Kamp 2 (2023)

=== Children's books ===
- Drengen der drog nordpå med sin far for at finde julemanden (2015), illustrated by Peter Bay Alexandersen
- Skovpigen Skærv (2016), illustrated by Peter Bay Alexandersen
- Pigen der kunne tale med hunde (2017), illustrated by Peter Bay Alexandersen

=== Comics ===
- Trojka 1: Skarabæens time (2018), illustrated by Søren Mosdal

== Literary prizes ==
- 2007 - Bodil and Jørgen Munch-Christensen's Debut Author Prize for Kalak
- 2012 - Weekendavisen Book Award, De Gyldne Laurbær, Jytte Borberg Prize, Politiken's Literature Prize for The Prophets of Eternal Fjord
- 2013 - Danish Radio's Novel Prize, Nordic Council Literature Prize for The Prophets of Eternal Fjord
- 2017 - International Dublin Literary Award Shortlist for The Prophets of Eternal Fjord
- 2018 - Crown Prince Couple's Awards
