= Ib Michael =

Danish novelist and poet (born 1945)

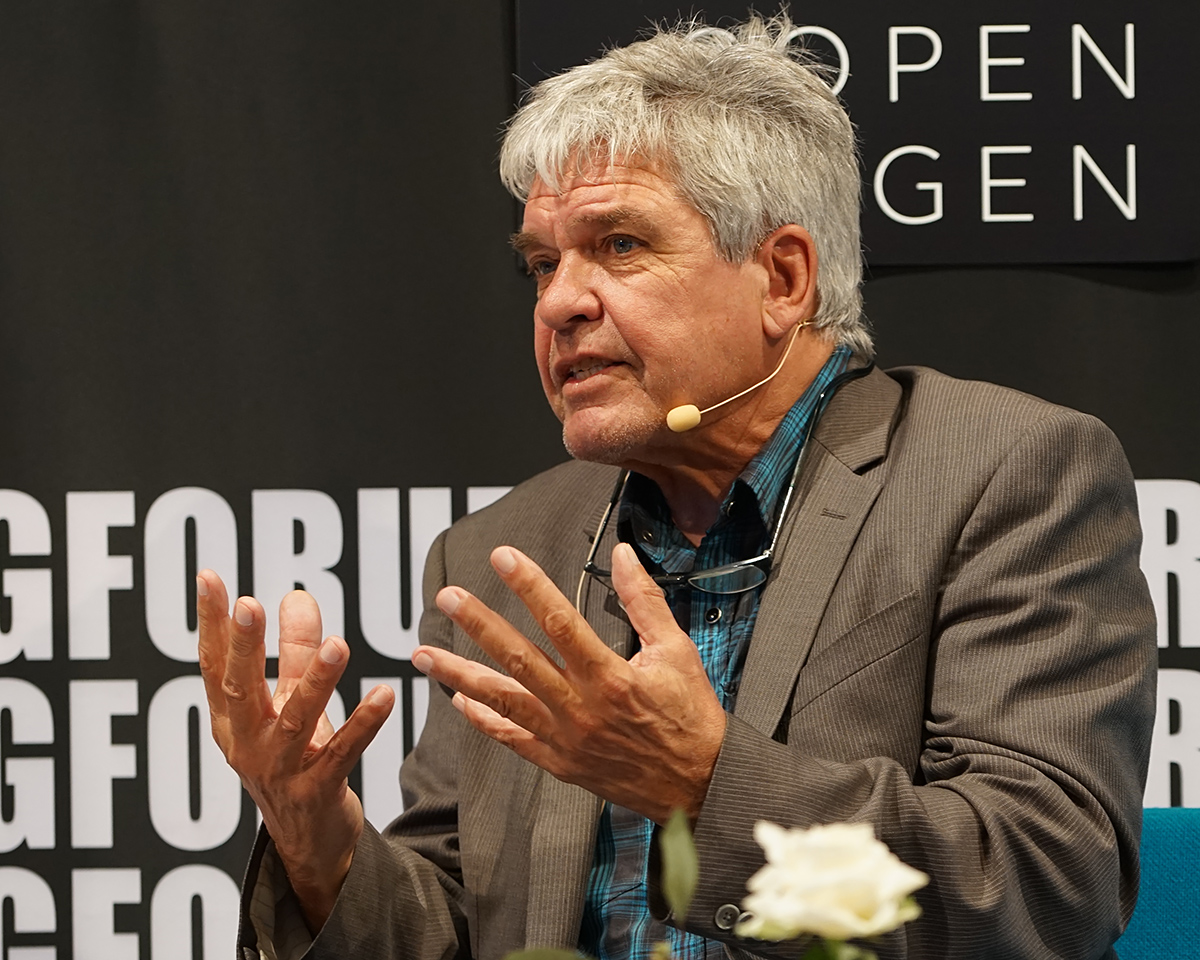
Ib Michael (2015)

Ib Michael (born 1945 in Roskilde, Denmark) is a Danish novelist and poet. His writing style has been described as magic realism.

He attended the University of Copenhagen, where he studied Central American and Indian Language and Culture. Michael is the author of the works "Kejserfortællingen" (The Tiger's Tale), "Kilroy, Kilroy", "Vanillepigen" (The Vanilla Girl), "Den tolvte rytter" (The Midnight Soldier), "Brev til månen" (Letter to the Moon), and "Prins" (Prince). He has won numerous awards, including the Otto Gelsted Prize in 1978, The Booksellers Club Golden Laurel in 1990, The Danish Author Association Peace Prize in 1991, and the Grand Prize of the Danish Academy in 1994.

== Bibliography ==
- En hidtil uset drøm om skibe (1970)
- Den flyvende kalkundræber (1971)
- Warum ist die Banane so krumm (radio drama, 1973)
- Indianerliv i regnskoven (together with Per Kirkeby and Teit Jørgensen, 1973)
- Mayalandet (together with Per Kirkeby og Teit Jørgensen, 1973)
- Hjortefod (1974)
- Popol Vuh – Quiché-mayaernes Folkebog (1975)
- Den udødelige soldat (radio drama in 4 episodes, 1976)
- Rejsen tilbage (1977)
- Rejsen til det grønne firben (memoir, 1980)
- Snedronningen (1981)
- Kejserfortællingen (1981)
- Troubadourens lærling (1984)
- Himmelbegravelse (poems, 1986)
- Sonde (radio drama, 1987)
- Hajskygger (1988)
- Kilroy, Kilroy (1989)
- Vinden i metroen (poems, 1990)
- Vanillepigen (1991)
- Glæden ved at dykke (1993)
- Den tolvte rytter (1993)
- Det lukkede øje (1994)
- Brev til månen (1995)
- Prins (1997)
- Atkinsons biograf – en vandrehistorie (short stories, 1998)
- Rosa Mundi (poems, 2000)
- Mit år (diary, 2000)
- Kejserens Atlas (2001)
- Paven af Indien (2003)
- Grill (2005)
- Blå bror (2006)
- Sorte huller (2007)
- Vilde Engle (2009)

== Honour ==
- 1970, 1974, 1977, 1983, 1985, 1989 Statens Kunstfond, Travel grant
- 1978 Otto Gelsted Prize
- 1979 Gyldendals boglegat
- 1985 Otto Benzons Forfatterlegat
- 1985 Jeanne og Henri Nathansens Fødselsdagslegat
- 1987 Henrik Pontoppidans Mindefonds Legat
- 1989 Literature Prize of Weekendavisen
- 1990 De Gyldne Laurbær
- 1991 Drassows Legat
- 1991 Danish Critics Prize for Literature
- 1993 Søren Gyldendal Prize
- 1994 Grand Prize of the Danish Academy
- 1995 Bog & Idé Prisen
- 2010 Ridderkorset af Dannebrogordenen (Order of the Dannebrog, 16 April)
- 2017 Drachmannlegatet
