= Naja Marie Aidt =

Danish-language poet and writer (born 1963)

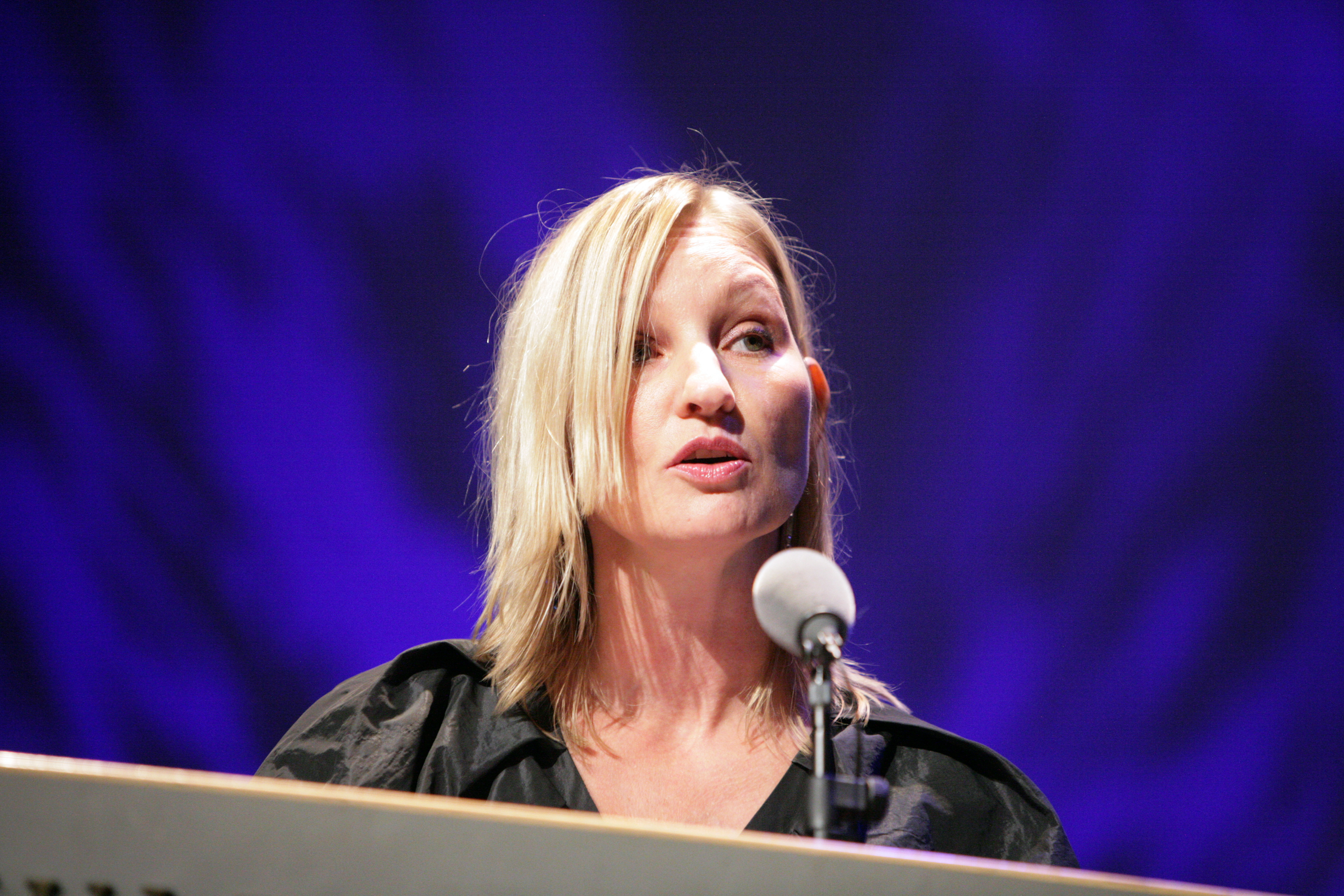
Naja Marie Aidt, winner of the Nordic Council Literature Prize in 2008

Naja Marie Aidt (born 24 December 1963) is a Danish-language poet and writer.

== Biography ==
Aidt was born in Aasiaat, Greenland, and was brought up partly in Greenland and partly in the Vesterbro area of Copenhagen. In 1991, she published her first book of poetry, Så længe jeg er ung (While I'm Still Young). Since 1993, she has been a full-time writer. In 1994, Aidt was awarded the Danish Fund for the Endowment of the Arts three-year bursary.

Aidt won the Nordic Council's Literature Prize in 2009 for her short stories collection. Bavian (Baboon, 2006), Bavian also earned her the Danish Kritikerprisen for 2007.

== Bibliography ==
- Har døden taget noget fra dig så giv det tilbage (2017), Gyldendal; Translated as When Death Takes Something From You Give It Back by Denise Newman (2019)
- OMINA (2016) co-authored by Mette Moestrup, Gyldendal – poetry
- Frit flet (2014), co-authored by Mette Moestrup and Line Knutzon, Gyldendal
- Sten saks papir (2012), Gyldendal – novel; Translated as Rock, Paper, Scissors by K.E. Semmel (2015)
- Alting Blinker (2009), Gyldendal – poetry
- Poesibog (2008), Gyldendal – poetry collection
- Bavian (2006), Gyldendal – short stories; Translated as Baboon by Denise Newman (2014)
- Balladen om Bianca (2002), Gyldendal
- Siska (2000), Cafe Teatret – drama
- Rejse for en fremmed, digte (1999), Gyldendal – poetry
- Tjenende ånder (1998), Radio-Teatret – radio play
- Blæs på Odysseus (1998), Thorvaldsens Museum – songs for choir
- Fra digterens hånd (1996), Borgens Forlag – poetry
- Omstændigheder (1995), Gyldendal – short stories
- Huset overfor (1995), Gyldendal – poetry
- Tilgang (1995), Gyldendal – short stories
- Det tredje landskab (1994), Gyldendal – poetry
- Vandmærket (1993), Gyldendal – short stories
- Som englene flyver (1993) Gyldendal – short stories
- Den blomstrende have (1993), Gyldendal – short stories
- Et vanskeligt møde (1992), Gyldendal – poetry
- Så længe jeg er ung (1991), Gyldendal – poetry

== Prizes and grants ==
Aidt has received several grants from Statens Kunstfond; other prizes include:

- 1993: Gyldendal's Book prize (Gyldendals boglegat) (25,000 DKK to buy books for)
- 1996: Martin Andersen Nexø Prize.
- 1996: Herman Bangs Mindelegat.
- 2004: Beatrice Prize
- 2007: Kritikerprisen (Danish Critics Prize for Literature)
- 2008: Nordic Council's Literature Prize
- 2011: Søren Gyldendal Prize
- 2020: Grand Prize of the Danish Academy
- 2022: Swedish Academy Nordic Prize
