= Ole Sarvig =

Danish author and poet (1921–1981)

Ole Sarvig (Danish pronunciation: [ˈoːlə ˈsɑːviˀ]) (27 November 1921 in Copenhagen – 4 December 1981 in Copenhagen) was a Danish author and poet, known for his participation in the literary journal heretica. In 1967 he received the grand prize of the Danish Academy. In 2004 his 1943 work Regnmaaleren was included in the Danish Culture Canon. He was a friend and mentor to the poet Michael Strunge, whose poem "December" remembers Sarvig's death by suicide in December 1981. Like Sarvig, Strunge took his life by jumping from a building.

== Selected works ==
- Grønne digte (1943)
- Jeghuset (poems, 1944)
- Mangfoldighed (poems, 1945)
- Legende (poems, 1946)
- Menneske (poems, 1948)
- Edvard Munchs Grafik (art critique, 1948)
- Krisens Billedbog (art essays, 1950)
- Min Kærlighed (poems, 1952)
- Stenrosen (novel, 1955)
- De Sovende (novel, 1958)
- Havet under mit Vindue (novel, 1960)
- Limbo (novel, 1963)
- Spirende digte (1967)
- Glem Ikke (novel, 1972)
- Sejlads (tv-drama, 1974)
- De rejsende. En undergangsroman (1978)
