= Suzanne Brøgger =

Danish writer

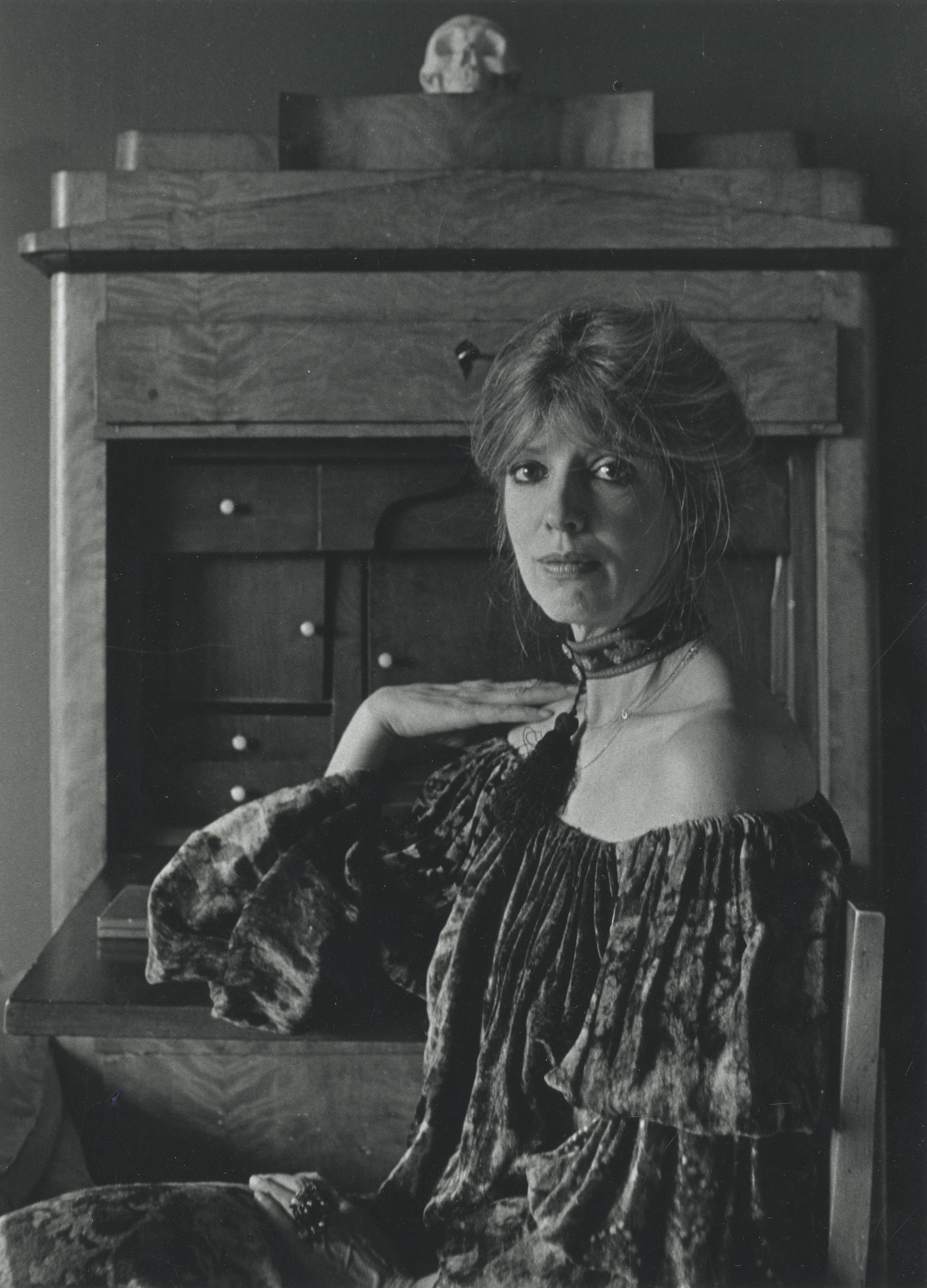
Suzanne Brøgger, 1991

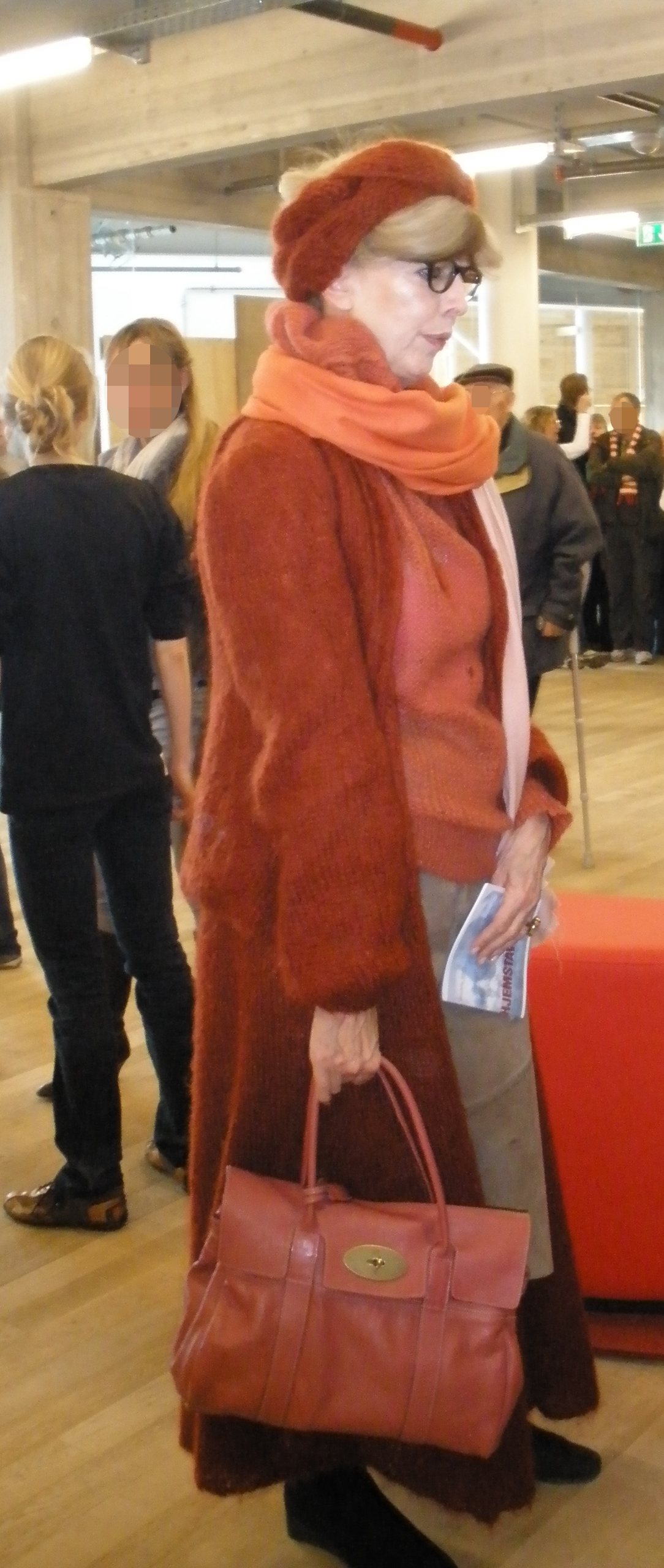
Suzanne Brøgger, 2010

Suzanne Preis Brøgger Zeruneith (born 18 November 1944 in Copenhagen) is a Danish writer, a novelist, poet and journalist. Her first book Fri os fra kærligheden has been translated into c. 20 languages. Since 1997 she has been a member of the Danish Academy.

== Early life ==
Brøgger grew up in Denmark until she was fourteen. She later moved abroad with her mother and her stepfather Svend Brøgger, who worked for UNICEF and was stationed in Colombo, Sri Lanka and later in Bangkok, Thailand. Suzanne Brøgger returned to Denmark to attend high school a couple of years later. She finished at the Silkeborg Gymnasium (a secondary school) in 1964, and she then studied Russian and French at the University of Copenhagen. She did not graduate, but later said that her university days inspired her to constantly extend her horizons in life-long study.

== After secondary school ==
While studying she also worked as a model and with films and theatre. Through articles in Danish newspapers in the form of interviews, travel descriptions and war articles, she got in touch with a publishing house, which offered her to publish her first book. Her first book was the essay collection Fri os fra kærligheden (Deliver Us from Love), which was published in 1973, it is critical against the western way of life. Her break through in Danish literature was Creme Fraiche, which was published in 1978. This book is the first of a trilogy of autobiographical books and describes her childhood and youth years in Denmark and in the South Asia/Southeast Asia (Sri Lanka and Thailand). In 1997 she published one of her main works the family saga Jadekatten (The Jade Cat: A Family Saga, 1997) where she writes about the same autobiographical themes as in the trilogy, which started with Creme Fraiche in 1973, but here she also writes about her Jewish family who immigrated from Poland to Denmark. Besides from being a portrayal of the loss of a family, it is also a showdown with her mother.

== Family ==
She is the daughter of Ove Preis (1920–69) and Lilian Henius (1921–93), stepdaughter of Svend Brøgger. She is married to Keld Zeruneith, they have one child together.

== Bibliography ==
- 1973 – Fri os fra kærligheden
- 1975 – Kærlighedens veje & vildveje
- 1978 – Creme fraiche
- 1979 – En gris som har været oppe at slås kan man ikke stege
- 1980 – Brøg, essays og journalistik fra 1960'erne
- 1981 – Tone
- 1984 – JA
- 1986 – Den pebrede susen
- 1988 – Livsformer – essay "Om at kysse hesten"
- 1988 – Edvard og Elvira
- 1990 – Min verden i en nøddeskal
- 1991 – Efter Orgiet
- 1993 – Paradisets Mave
- 1993 – Transparence
- 1994 – Vølvens spådom (poems, retelling of the Old Norse Völuspá)
- 1995 – Løvespor
- 1997 – Jadekatten (novel)
- 1998 – Et frit og muntert lig
- 1999 – Lotusøje (poems)
- 2000 – Sejd
- 2001 – Linda Evangelista Olsen
- 2006 – Sølve
- 2008 – Sløret (poems)
- 2010 – Jeg har set den gamle verden forsvinde – hvor er mine ørenringe?
- 2016 – En sommer med Emmanuelle Arsan (Un été avec Emmanuelle Arsan) bilingual postface (french/dansk) of La Philosophie Nue by Emmanuelle Arsan.

== Awards and prizes ==
Some of the many awards and prizes which Suzanne Brøgger has received:

- 1975: PH-prisen
- 1980: Weekendavisens Litteraturpris
- 1982: De Gyldne Laurbær
- 1985: Tagea Brandts Rejselegat
- 1985: Lifelong grant from Statens Kunstfond
- 1996: Dansk Kvindesamfunds Mathildepris
- 1999: Søren Gyldendal Prize
- 2001: Jeanne og Henri Nathansens Mindelegat
- 2002: Adam Oehlenschläger Legatet
- 2005: Rungstedlund Award

== Literature ==
- Louise Zeuthen. Krukke. En biografi om Suzanne Brøgger
