= Gorm Henrik Rasmussen =

Danish poet (born 1955)

Gorm Henrik Rasmussen (born 1955) is a Danish poet who wrote the first biography about the guitarist and singer-songwriter Nick Drake, Pink Moon (1986). The book is based upon interviews Gorm Henrik Rasmussen made with Nick Drake's parents, Rodney and Molly Drake, in their home in Tanworth-in-Arden, Warwickshire, England, in 1979 and 1980. Pink Moon was re-written and translated into English in 2009. In 2012, it became the launch title for Rocket 88, a new music book imprint of Essential Works. A Spanish version has also appeared in 2012.

Gorm Henrik Rasmussen is known in Denmark for a number of books about eccentrics and strange places in the northern part of Jutland where he was born and raised. He has received several literary awards from The Danish Arts Foundation and The Danish Arts Council.
