= Michael Strunge =

Danish poet (1958–1986)

Michael Strunge Jensen (19 June 1958 – 9 March 1986) was a Danish poet. He is regarded as perhaps the most influential Danish postmodern poet, and his works are among the most studied poems in Denmark.

As a member of the original circle of 1980s poets in the group around Hvedekorn's editor Poul Borum, Michael Strunge, in cooperation with his colleague Jens Fink-Jensen, among others, arranged the generational manifestation “NÅ!!80” in Copenhagen in 1980.

He received the Otto Gelsted Prize in 1983.

With influences from both Romanticism, Symbolism and Modernism, Strunge's work is somewhat reminiscent of that of French poet Arthur Rimbaud. Strunge's poetry deals with such topics as sex, death, modernity and life in the city.

Originally inspired by the British punk wave of the late 1970s, many of Strunge's poems are full of references to the artists of his day, such as The Sex Pistols, The Clash, The Cure, Joy Division, New Order, Brian Eno and David Bowie.

Strunge caused his own death on 9 March 1986, during a manic episode caused by bipolar disorder, by jumping from the 4th floor. His last words before jumping were "Now I can fly", indicating that he did not mean to kill himself. The quote is printed on a memorial plaque placed on the facade of the building he jumped from. He is buried at Assistens Cemetery in Copenhagen.
