= Pia Tafdrup =

Danish writer and poet (born 1952)

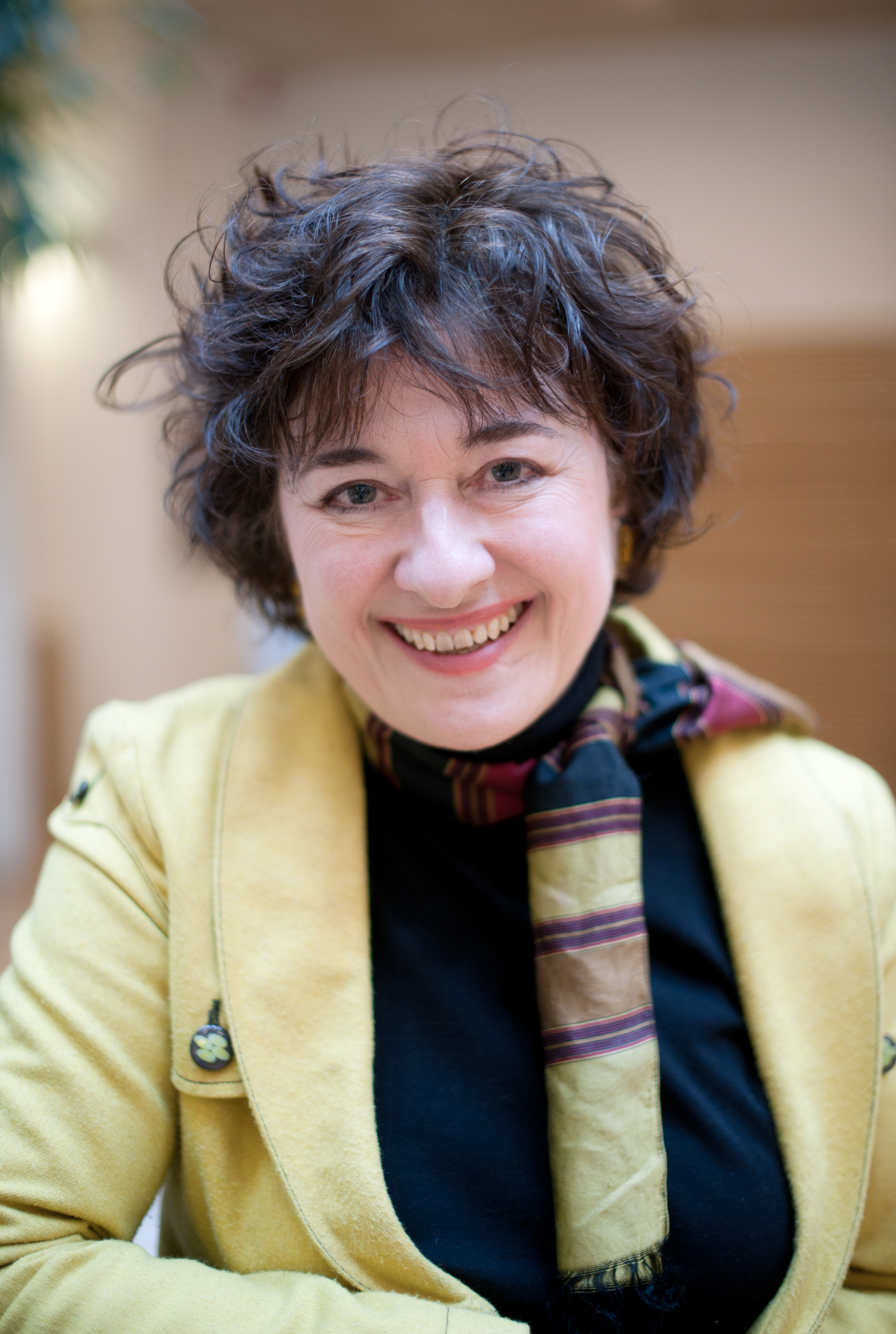
- Tafdrup at the Nordic Council Literature Prize 2011
- Born: 29 May 1952 (age 74); Copenhagen, Denmark
- Occupation: Poet
- Writing career
- Language: Danish
- Website: www.tafdrup.com/en

Pia Tafdrup (born 29 May 1952 in Copenhagen) is a Danish writer; primarily a poet, she has also written a novel and two plays, as well as works for radio. She made her literary debut in 1981 and has till now published 17 collections of poetry.

Pia Tafdrup's work has been translated into more than twenty-five languages, and her poetry collections Spring Tide (1989) and Queen's Gate (2001) have been translated into English and Romanian.

== Bibliography ==
=== Poems ===
- When an Angel Breaks her Silence, 1981
- No Hold, 1982
- The Innermost Zone, 1983
- Spring Tide, 1985 (Eng. 1989)
- White Fever, 1986
- The Bridge of Moments, 1988
- The Crystal Forest, 1992
- Territorial Song. A Jerusalem Cycle, 1994
- Queen´s Gate, 1998 (Eng. 2001)
- Thousand Born 1999
- The Salamander Quartet: The Whales in Paris, 2002 (Eng. in Tarkovsky´s Horses 2010)
- Tarkovsky´s Horses, 2006 (Eng. Tarkovsky´s Horses & Other Poems 2010), Boomerang, 2008
- Birds of Compass. Poems. Gyldendal, 2010 (Eng. Salamander Sun & Other Poems 2015)
- Salamander Sun 2012(Eng. Salamander Sun & Other Poems 2015)
- The Taste of Steel, 2014
- The Taste of Snow, 2016

== Awards and honors ==
She was elected as a member of the Danish Academy in 1989. She was awarded the Nordic Council Literature Prize in 1999. In 2001, she was appointed a Knight of the Order of the Dannebrog. In 2005 she was awarded the Søren Gyldendal Prize.Litteraturpriser.dk In 2006, she won the Swedish Academy Nordic Prize, known as the 'little Nobel', in 2009, Tafdrup received the Ján Smrek Prize in Bratislava (Slovakia).

== See also ==
- Tagea Brandt Rejselegat
