= Knud Sørensen =

Danish writer, poet and novelist (1928–2022)

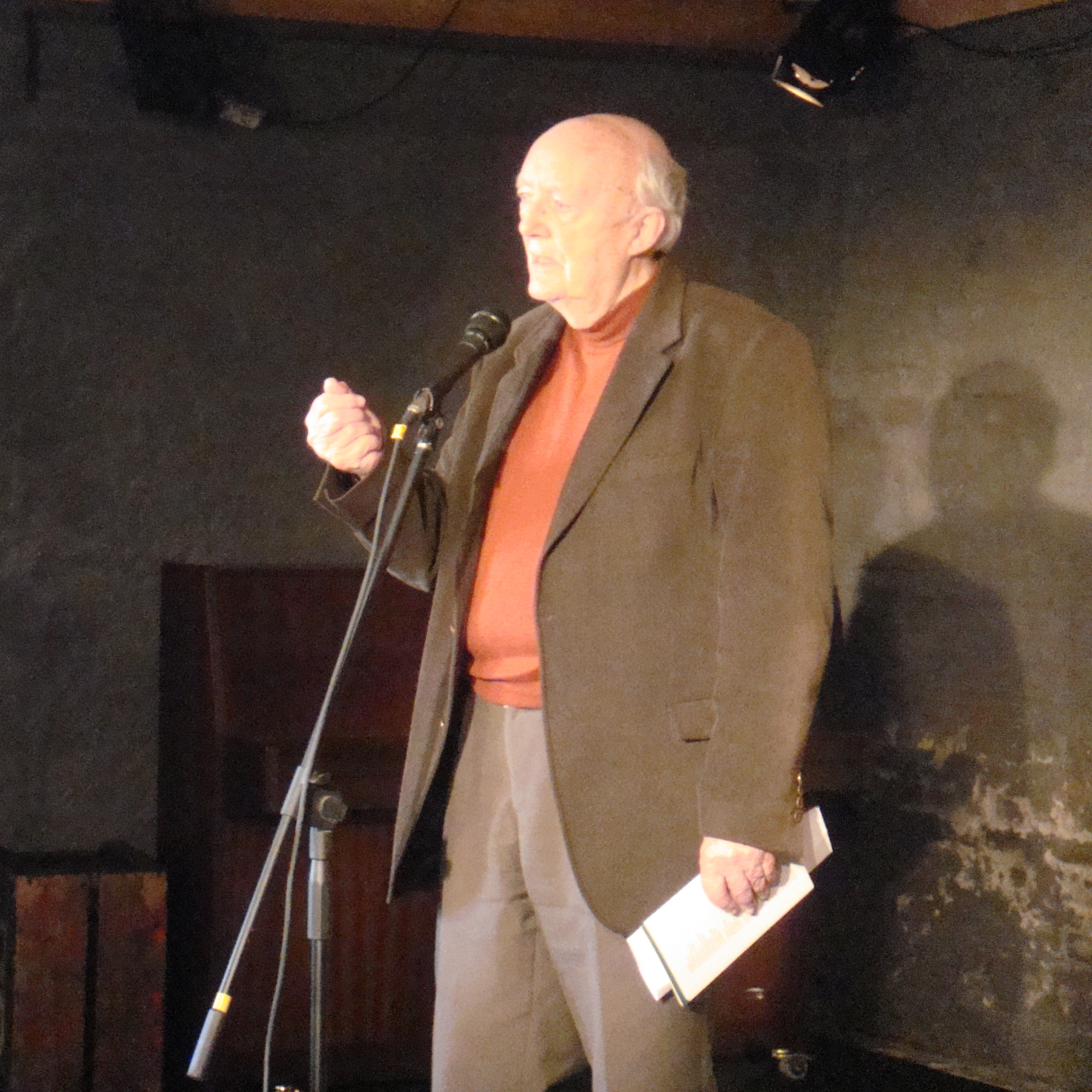
- Knud Sørensen 2011
- Died: 26 September 2022
- Awards: Drassow's Legat (1993); (2014); literary prize of the Limfjord region (1993)

Knud Sørensen (10 March 1928 – 26 September 2022) was a Danish writer, poet and novelist.

Born in Hjørring, in 1958 Sørensen settled as a surveyor on Mors. He made his debut as a poet with Eksplosion in 1961. Since then, his authorship has included poems, essays, novels, biographies, and a radio play. His 1997 novel En tid was awarded the Kritikerprisen by the Danish Publishers Association and Weekendavisen's 1997 literature award. Additionally, he has received a number of working grants and funds, including a lifelong grant from the Danish Arts Agency.

== Bibliography ==
Selected

- Eksplosion (1961)
- Bondeslutspil (1980/85)
- Marginaljord (1987)
- En tid (1997)
- En befrielse (1999)
- Digterne omkring Limfjorden (2002)
- Kun slutningen mangler (2008) (autobiography)
