= Benny Andersen =

Danish songwriter, poet

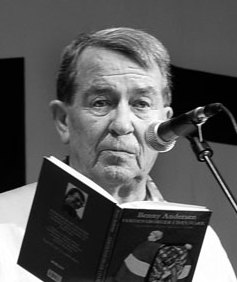
- Benny Andersen at the 2009 Danish book fair
- Born: 7 November 1929; Vangede, Denmark
- Died: 16 August 2018 (aged 88); Sorgenfri, Denmark
- Occupation: Writer
- Writing career
- Period: 1960–2018

Benny Andersen (7 November 1929 – 16 August 2018) was a Danish poet, author, songwriter, composer and pianist. He is often remembered for his collaboration with the singer Povl Dissing; together they released an album with Andersen's poems from the collection Svantes viser. This album and Andersen's book "Svantes viser" (Svante's Songs) from 1972 were included by the Danish Ministry of Culture in the Danish Culture Canon in 2006, in the category "Popular music". Andersen's "Samlede digte" (Collected poems) have sold more than 100,000 copies in Denmark.

In Denmark, Benny Andersen was also a well-known author of children's literature and in 1971, he was awarded the Ministry of Culture's children book prize ("Kulturministeriets Børnebogspris"). In the 1980s, his books about the fantastical creature Snøvsen, became widely popular and later inspired two films in the early 90s.

Andersen became a member of the Danish Academy (Det Danske Akademi) in 1972.

His wife, the jurist Elisabeth Ehmer, reported that Benny Andersen died in the family home in Sorgenfri, north of Copenhagen, on 16 August 2018.

== Selected bibliography ==
Some of Benny Andersen's notable poem collections, includes:

- Den musikalske ål, 1960
- Kamera med køkkenadgang, 1962
- Nikke Nikke Nambo og andre danske børnerim og remser, 1963
- Den indre bowlerhat, 1964
- Portrætgalleri, 1966
- Det sidste øh og andre digte, 1969
- Her i reservatet, 1971
- Svantes viser, Borgen, 1972
- Personlige papirer, 1974
- Under begge øjne, 1978
- Himmelspræt (eller kunsten at komme til verden), 1979
- Tiden og storken, 1985
- H.C. Andersens land, 1985
- Chagall og skorpiondans, 1991
- Denne kommen og gåen, 1993
- Mit liv som indvandrer, 1993
- Verdensborger i Danmark, 1995
- Verden udenfor syltetøjsglasset, 1996
- Sjælen marineret, 2001
- Svantes lykkelige dag, 2003
- Spredte digte, 2005
- Den Vilde Ungdom, 2005
- Kram, 2009
- Den nøgne mand, 2010

A few of his short stories:

- Bukserne, 1963
- Et lykkeligt menneske, 1968
- Samlede noveller, 2003

== Sources ==
- Biography from biografi.dk(in Danish).
- Benny Andersen - Biography from Litteratur.dk (in Danish).
- Benny Andersen - Literature prizes (in Danish).
