= Henrik Nordbrandt =

Danish writer (1945–2023)

Henrik Nordbrandt (21 March 1945 – 31 January 2023) was a Danish poet, novelist, and essayist. He made his literary debut in 1966 with the poetry collection Digte. He was awarded the Nordic Council's Literature Prize in 2000 for the poetry collection Drømmebroer ("Dream Bridges").

Although a Danish writer, he spent much of his life in the Mediterranean basin and this is said to have had an influence on his writing.

In 2007 the Polish painter Kasia Banas carried out a project that included paintings inspired by the poetry of Nordbrandt.

== Works ==
- Digte (1966)
- Miniaturer (1967)
- Syvsoverne (1969)
- Omgivelser (1972)
- Opbrud og ankomster ("Departures and Arrivals"), Copenhagen: Gylandal, 72 pages (1974)
- Ode til blæksprutten og andre kærlighedsdigte ("Ode to the Octopus and Other Love Poems"), Copenhagen: Gyldendal, 55 pages (1975)
- Glas ("Glass") Copenhagen: Gyldendal, 53 pages (1976)
- Istid (1977)
- Guds hus (1977)
- Breve fra en ottoman (1978)
- Rosen fra Lesbos (1979)
- Spøgelseslege (1979)
- Forsvar for vinden under døren (1980)
- Armenia (1982)
- 84 digte ("84 Poems"); Copenhagen: Gyldendal, 125 pages (1984)
- Armenia (1984)
- Violinbyggernes by (1985)
- Håndens skælven i november (1986)
- Vandspejlet (1989)
- Glemmesteder (1991)
- Støvets tyngde (1992)
- Ormene ved himlens port (1995)
- Egne digte ("Own Poems"), Copenhagen: Gyldendal, 289 pages (2000)
- Drømmebroer ("Dream Bridges") (2000)
- Besøgstid ('Visiting Hours') (2007)

== Awards ==
- 1990: Swedish Academy Nordic Prize
- 2000: Nordic Council's Literature Prize, for Drømmebroer ("Dream Bridges")
