= Drachmannlegatet =

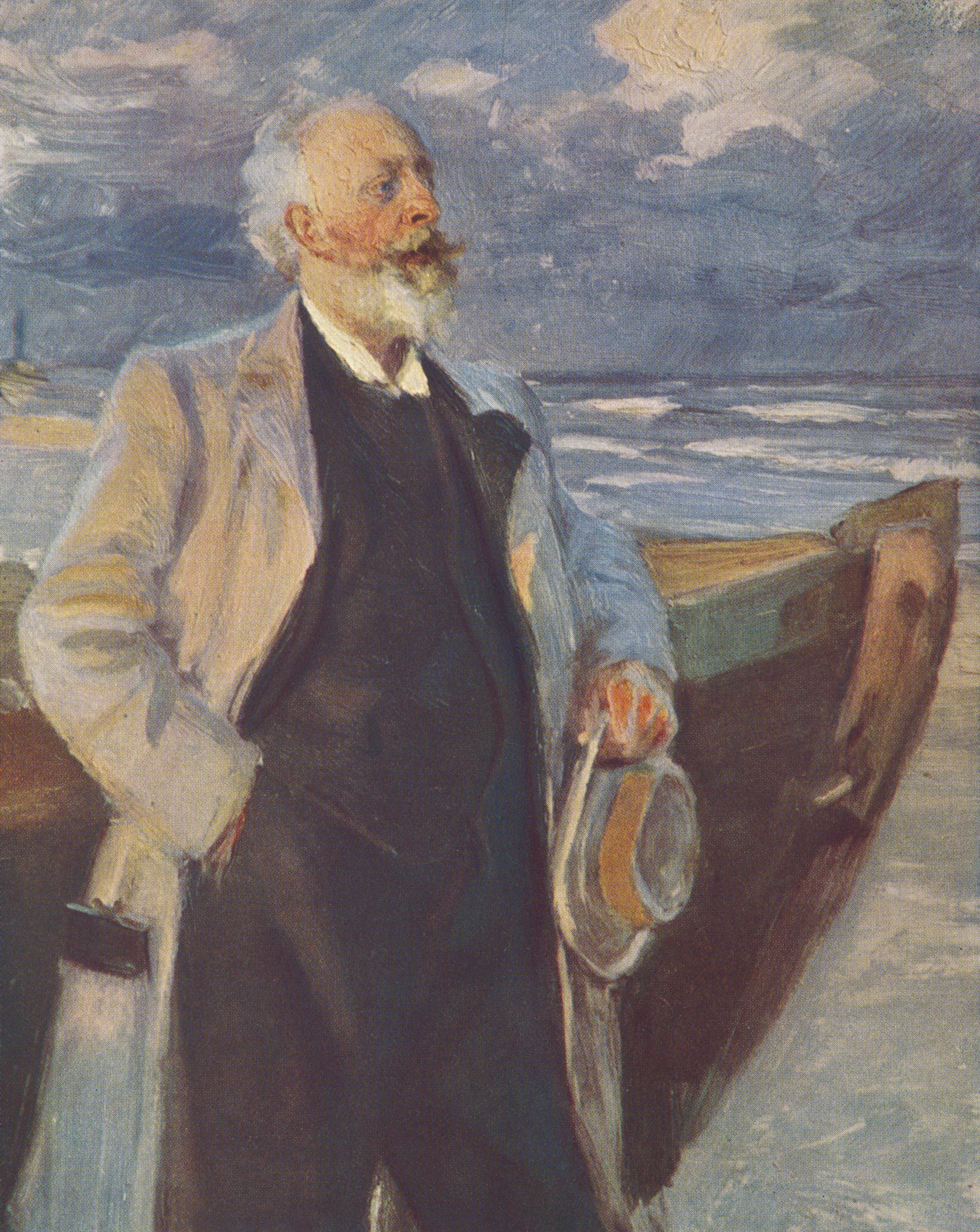
Portrait of Holger Drachmann painted by Peder Severin Krøyer

Drachmannlegatet is a Danish literary award founded in 1917, based on funding derived from the entrance fee to Drachmanns Hus in Skagen. The winner is announced annually on 9 October, the anniversary of the birthday of Danish writer and painter Holger Drachmann (1846–1908).

== History ==
Efforts were first made to establish the award in 1916, in connection with the 70th anniversary of Drachmann's birth. It was first awarded the next year in 1917 to Johannes Buchholtz (1882–1940). Occasionally the Drachmann has not been awarded on a given year, though on other occasions it has been awarded to multiple authors.

== List of recipients ==
The following authors have been awarded the Drachmannlegatet:

- 1917: Johannes Buchholtz
- 1918: Helge Rode and Johannes V. Jensen
- 1919: Harald Bergstedt and Kai Hoffmann
- 1920: Ludvig Holstein
- 1921: Harry Søiberg
- 1922: Otto Rung
- 1923: Carl Gandrup
- 1924: Sven Lange
- 1925: Einar Rousthøj and Hans Hartvig Seedorff
- 1926: Emmy Drachmann
- 1927: Christian Rimestad and Knud Hjortø
- 1928: Jeppe Aakjær
- 1929: L.C. Nielsen
- 1930: Thit Jensen
- 1931: Laurids Bruun
- 1932: Axel Juel and Per Lange
- 1933: Johannes Jørgensen
- 1934: Tom Kristensen
- 1935: Hakon Holm
- 1936: Emil Bønnelycke and Hans Ahlmann
- 1937: Valdemar Rørdam
- 1938: Hulda Lütken
- 1939: Alba Schwartz and Hans Kirk
- 1940: Carl Erik Soya and Marcus Lauesen
- 1941: Aage Berntsen and Paul la Cour
- 1942: No recipient
- 1943: Alex Garff
- 1944: Jens August Schade
- 1945: Tove Ditlevsen
- 1946: Martin A. Hansen and Sigfred Pedersen
- 1947: Karin Michaëlis
- 1948: Ole Sarvig
- 1949: Børge Madsen
- 1950: Knud Sønderby
- 1951: Kjeld Abell
- 1952: Johannes Wulff and William Heinesen
- 1953: Agnes Henningsen and Eva Drachmann
- 1954: Hans Scherfig
- 1955: H.C. Branner
- 1956: Gerd la Cour
- 1957: Aase Hansen
- 1958: Otto Gelsted
- 1959: Johannes Ursin and Knuth Becker
- 1960: Erling Kristensen and Halfdan Rasmussen
- 1961: Per Lange
- 1962: Frank Jæger
- 1963: Erik Knudsen
- 1964: Thorkild Bjørnvig
- 1965: Aage Dons
- 1966: Jørgen Sonne
- 1967: Orla Bundgård Povlsen
- 1968: Villy Sørensen
- 1969: Ivan Malinowski
- 1970: Jørgen Gustava Brandt
- 1971: No recipient
- 1972: No recipient
- 1973: Cecil Bødker
- 1974: Henrik Nordbrandt
- 1975: No recipient
- 1976: Kristen Bjørnkjær
- 1977: No recipient
- 1978: Maria Giacobbe and Uffe Harder
- 1979: Peter Poulsen
- 1980: Asger Schnack
- 1981: No recipient
- 1982: No recipient
- 1983: Henning Fleischer and Lean Nielsen
- 1984: No recipient
- 1985: No recipient
- 1986: Pia Tafdrup
- 1987: Søren Ulrik Thomsen
- 1988: Ove Abildgaard
- 1989: Preben Major Sørensen
- 1990: Peter Laugesen
- 1991: Rolf Gjedsted
- 1992: Erik Stinus
- 1993: F.P. Jac
- 1994: No recipient
- 1995: Jørgen Leth
- 1996: Inger Christensen
- 1997: Johannes Møllehave
- 1998: Knud Sørensen
- 1999: Ulrich Horst Petersen
- 2000: Claus Beck-Nielsen
- 2001: Merete Torp
- 2002: Jens Christian Grøndahl
- 2003: Katrine Marie Guldager
- 2004: Hanne Marie Svendsen
- 2005: Jens Smærup Sørensen
- 2006: Ida Jessen
- 2007: Jeppe Brixvold
- 2008: Vibeke Grønfeldt
- 2009: Thomas Boberg
- 2010: Dorrit Willumsen
- 2011: No recipient
- 2012: Marianne Larsen
- 2013: Klaus Rifbjerg
- 2014: Sten Kaalø
- 2015: Pia Juul
- 2016: Kristina Stoltz
- 2017: Ib Michael
- 2018: Susanne Jorn
- 2019: Kim Leine
- 2020: Morten Søndergaard
- 2021: Kristian Ditlev Jensen
- 2022: Jesper Wung-Sung
