= Holberg Medal =

Danish literary award

The Holberg Medal (Danish: Holberg-Medaljen) is an award to a Danish author of fiction or writer on science. It is awarded by the Danish association of authors, and is an appreciation of a literary or scientific work or of the award winner's authorship as a whole. The prize is often awarded on 3 December, the birthday of Ludvig Holberg. The first award was given in 1934 in connection with the 40th anniversary of the Danish association of authors.

The winner is decided by a committee consisting of 1 member from the Danish Ministry of Culture's literature council, two representatives from the University of Copenhagen and two representatives from the Danish association of authors.

== Prize winners ==
- 1934 – Vilhelm Andersen
- 1935 – Sven Clausen
- 1937 – Valdemar Rørdam
- 1938 – Th.A. Müller
- 1939 – Jacob Paludan
- 1940 – Thit Jensen
- 1941 – Henrik Pontoppidan
- 1942 – Frederik Poulsen
- 1943 – Otto Rung
- 1944 – Johannes Jørgensen
- 1945 – Tom Kristensen
- 1946 – Harry Søiberg
- 1947 – Carl Erik Soya
- 1948 – Paul la Cour
- 1949 – Karen Blixen
- 1950 – Hans Hartvig Seedorff Pedersen
- 1951 – Torben Krogh
- 1952 – Martin A. Hansen
- 1953 – Helge Topsøe-Jensen
- 1954 – H.C. Branner
- 1955 – Knuth Becker
- 1956 – Palle Lauring
- 1957 – Kjeld Abell
- 1958 – F.J. Billeskov Jansen
- 1959 – Knud Sønderby
- 1960 – William Heinesen
- 1961 – Robert Neiiendam
- 1962 – Finn Methling
- 1963 – Otto Gelsted
- 1964 – Morten Borup
- 1965 – Hans Scherfig
- 1966 – Aage Dons
- 1967 – Hakon Stangerup
- 1968 – Willy-August Linnemann
- 1969 – Steen Eiler Rasmussen
- 1970 – Rudolf Broby-Johansen
- 1971 – Leif Panduro
- 1972 – K.E. Løgstrup
- 1973 – Villy Sørensen
- 1974 – Oluf Friis
- 1975 – Aage Kragelund
- 1976 – Elsa Gress
- 1977 – Jens Kruuse
- 1978 – Erik Knudsen
- 1979 – Klaus Rifbjerg
- 1980 – Aage Hansen
- 1981 – Svend Kragh-Jacobsen
- 1982 – Heðin Brú
- 1983 – Thorkild Bjørnvig
- 1984 – Lise Sørensen
- 1985 – Jørgen Gustava Brandt
- 1986 – Halfdan Rasmussen
- 1987 – Inger Christensen
- 1988 – Svend Eegholm Pedersen
- 1989 – Ulla Ryum
- 1990 – Svend Aage Madsen
- 1991 – Sven Holm
- 1992 – Suzanne Brøgger
- 1993 – Erik A. Nielsen
- 1994 – Ole Wivel
- 1995 – Henrik Stangerup
- 1996 – Astrid Saalbach
- 1997 – Per Højholt
- 1998 – Jess Ørnsbo
- 1999 – Carsten Jensen
- 2000 – Bent Holm
- 2001 – Benny Andersen
- 2002 – Keld Zeruneith
- 2003 – Ebbe Kløvedal Reich
- 2004 – Erling Jepsen
- 2005 – Thomas Bredsdorff
- 2006 – Line Knutzon
- 2007 – Klaus Peter Mortensen
- 2008 – Anders Matthesen
- 2009 – Jørn Lund
- 2010 – Nikoline Werdelin
- 2011 – Ursula Andkjær Olsen
- 2012 - Rune Lykkeberg
- 2013 - Henning Mortensen
- 2014 - Karen Skovgaard-Petersen
- 2015 - Dorrit Willumsen
- 2016 - Ivar Gjørup
- 2017 - Kaspar Colling Nielsen
- 2018 - Peter Zeeberg
- 2019 - Helle Helle
- 2020 - Birgitte Possing
- 2021 - Dorte Karrebæk
- 2022 - Ditlev Tamm
- 2023 - Frederik Cilius
