= Grand Prize of the Danish Academy =

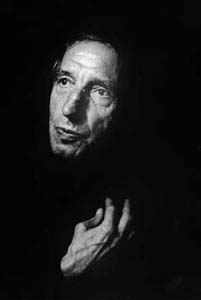
Jens August Schade, 1973

The Grand Prize of the Danish Academy, founded in 1961, is the most notable of Denmark's literature prizes and awards. It is awarded by the Danish Academy. Until 1982, it was handed yearly, but since then it has been given every second year. The first years the prize was 50.000 DKK. In 1982 the Cultural Ministry of Denmark increased the prize to 100.000 DKK. From 1992 to 1997 it was 200.000 DKK, in 1998 it was 250.000 DKK and since 2000 it has been 300.000 DKK. The prize is a recognition of a writers work as a whole and not only for one book.

== Recipients of the Grand Prize of the Danish Academy ==
- 1961 Knuth Becker
- 1962 Villy Sørensen
- 1963 Jens August Schade
- 1964 Jacob Paludan
- 1965 Erik Knudsen
- 1966 Klaus Rifbjerg
- 1967 Ole Sarvig
- 1968 Tom Kristensen
- 1969 Frank Jæger
- 1970 Ivan Malinowski
- 1971 Leif Panduro
- 1972 Svend Åge Madsen
- 1973 Hans Scherfig
- 1974 Sven Holm
- 1975 Carl Erik Soya
- 1976 Jørgen Sonne
- 1977 Peter Seeberg
- 1978 Tage Skou-Hansen
- 1979 Poul Vad
- 1980 Henrik Nordbrandt
- 1981 Dorrit Willumsen
- 1982 Per Højholt
- 1984 Jess Ørnsbo
- 1986 Henrik Stangerup
- 1988 Halfdan Rasmussen
- 1990 Jens Smærup Sørensen
- 1992 Peter Laugesen
- 1994 Ib Michael
- 1996 Vibeke Grønfeldt
- 1998 Cecil Bødker
- 2000 Kirsten Thorup
- 2002 Vagn Lundbye
- 2004 Peer Hultberg
- 2006 Bent Vinn Nielsen
- 2008 F.P. Jac
- 2010 Jørn Riel
- 2012 Thomas Boberg
- 2014 Knud Sørensen
- 2016 Helle Helle
- 2018 Christina Hesselholdt
- 2020 Naja Marie Aidt
- 2022 Marianne Larsen
- 2024 Solvej Balle
