= Theatre of Denmark =

Overview of theatre in Denmark

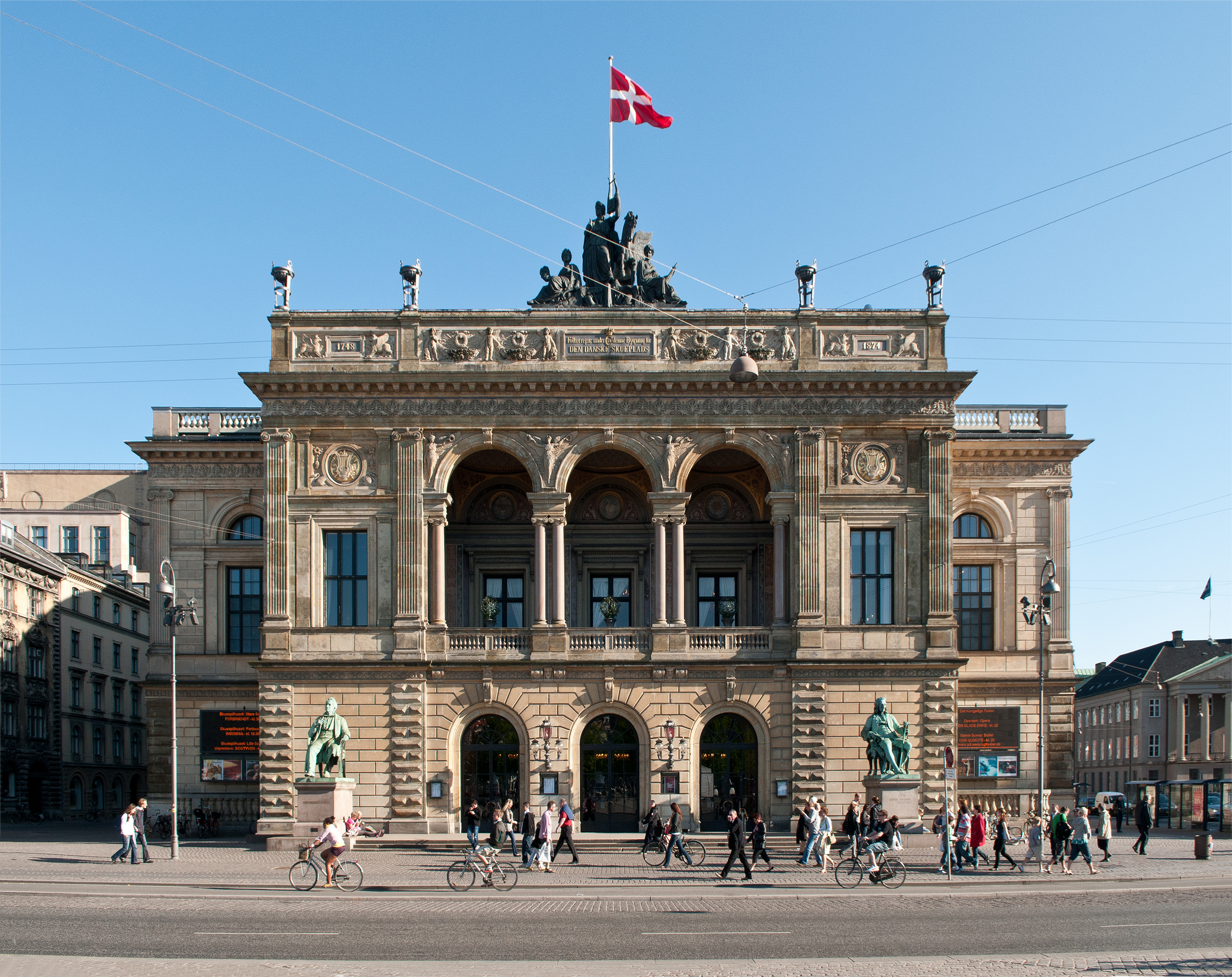
Royal Danish Theatre, Copenhagen

The theatre of Denmark continues to thrive thanks to the many theatres in Copenhagen and across the country which put on a wide variety of Danish and foreign performances. The flagship Royal Danish Theatre presents drama, opera, ballet and music. Since the 18th century, Danish playwrights have been successful in attracting wide public interest.

== History ==
It was in the 18th century with the plays of Ludvig Holberg (1684–1754) that Danish theatre began to prosper. Holberg, sometimes known as the Danish Molière in view of his successful satirical comedies (1722), is considered to be the founder of the Danish theatre. Plays such as Jean de France and Jeppe of the Hill are still performed today.

Adam Oehlenschläger (1779–1850) introduced romanticism to the Danish theatre. Especially successful was his Earl Hakon the Mighty, premiered in 1808.

The Norwegian Henrik Ibsen (1828–1906) also travelled to Copenhagen where he produced plays such as A Doll's House (1879). It deals with the hypocrisy of the bourgeoisie and a woman’s struggle to emancipate herself. For Ibsen and his contemporaries, drama was not a question of entertainment but an exercise in critical commentary on the lifestyle of the times. During this period, the Royal Theatre dominated the scene, but around 1850 other, to some extent more popular, theatres were established, starting with the Casino (1848) where Hans Christian Andersen produced his Ole Lukøie (1850). The Casino became popular for satirical revues in the 1870s.

In the 20th century, theatres were established in the large cities Århus, Odense and Aalborg as well as several in Copenhagen.

Kjeld Abell (1901–1961), the first Danish modernist playwright, wrote the successful The Melody That Got Lost in 1935 with productions in both Copenhagen and London. Kaj Munk (1898–1944), a Lutheran pastor, brought religion into his plays. Ordet (The Word) is often said to have been his best work. Carl Erik Soya (1896–1983) is remembered especially for his anti-Nazi plays such as En Gæst (A Guest) a satire aimed against the German occupation of Denmark and in 1943, Min Farmors Hus (made into the 1984 film Grandmother's House).

Leif Panduro (1923–1977) wrote a number of plays, some filmed or televised, criticising the middle class, the welfare state and the conflict between normal and abnormal, often questioning the views generally shared by the audience. His I Adams verden (1973) and Louises hus (1974) are among the best Scandinavian television dramas of the 1970s.

In recent years, there has been something of a revival in Danish theatre. Many new playwrights and producers have appeared. These include:

- Astrid Saalbach (born 1955), winner of the Nordic Drama Award in 2004 for he play End of the World, whose drama Morning and Evening (1993) was also played at the Hampstead Theatre in London;
- Peter Asmussen (born 1957), who wrote the film script for Lars von Trier's Breaking the Waves as well as numerous radio and television plays and staged dramas.

== Danish musicals ==
Encouraged by the success of the Danish version of Les Misérables, a number of Danish musicals have been written and performed in Copenhagen and elsewhere. Knud Christensen, commonly known as Sebastian, was particularly successful with Cyrano (1992), based on Rostand's play and Klokkeren fra Notre Dame (The Hunchback of Notre Dame) (2001). Bent Fabricius-Bjerre's musical Matador with lyrics by Clemens Telling based on an earlier, highly successful television series was premiered at the new Copenhagen Opera in June 2007 to full houses.

== See also ==
- Danish television drama
- Danish Culture Canon
