= Beatrice Prize =

Danish literary award

The Beatrice Prisen is an annual Danish literary award made by the Danish Academy. It was founded in 1983 by Birthe and Paul Beckett and first awarded in 1984. Its value is currently DKK 50,000. Each year, it honours one Danish writer, of either poetry or prose, whose "published books already have a quality, which there is reason to appreciate, and where there is reason to believe, that he or she will develop further."

== Winners ==
A list of winners can be found on the Danish Academy's dedicated page.

Year	Recipients	Ref(s)
1984	Henrik Bjelke	
1985	Peter Laugesen	
1986	Arthur Krasilnikoff	
1987	Klaus Høeck	
1988	Preben Major Sørensen	
1989	Marianne Larsen	
1990	Henning Mortensen	
1991	Vagn Lundbye	
1992	Anne Marie Ejrnæs	
1993	Christian Skov	
1994	Jette Drewsen	
1995	Maria Giacobbe	
1996	Knud Holten	
1997	F. P. Jac	
1998	Janina Katz	
2000	Pia Juul	
2001	Jens-Martin Eriksen	
2002	Nikolaj Stockholm	
2003	Helle Helle	
2004	Naja Marie Aidt	
2005	Kirsten Hammann	
2006	Morten Søndergaard	
2007	Christina Hesselholdt	
2009	Merete Pryds Helle	
2010	Katrine Marie Guldager	
2012	Camilla Christensen	
2013	Lars Frost	
2014	Lone Hørslev	
2015	Laus Strandby Nielsen	
2016	Sidsel Falsig Pedersen	
2017	Kristian Bang Foss	
2018	Mette Moestrup	
2019	Olga Ravn	
2021	Majse Aymo-Boot	
2023	Mikael Josephsen	
2025	Bjørn Rasmussen	
