= Danish Academy =

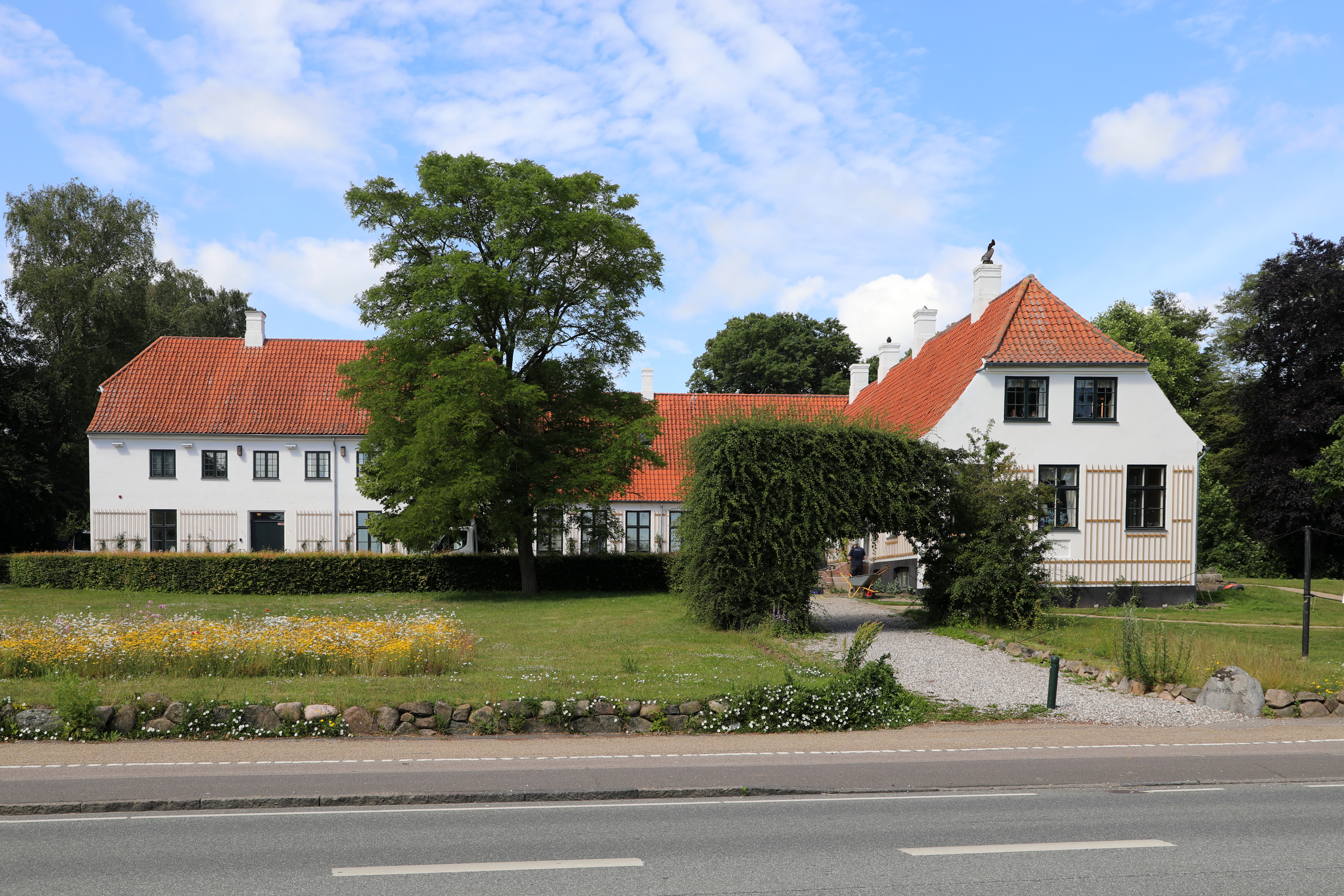
Rungstedlund north of Copenhagen where the Danish Academy has had its sessions since its foundation in 1950

Danish Academy is an independent organisation founded in 1960 by a circle of Danish intellectuals "to promote Danish esprit and language, especially within the field of literature". It has up to 20 members, currently 18, and is based at Rungstedlund, the former home of author Karen Blixen who was one of the original members. The Academy runs a number of annual literary prizes including most notably its Grand Prize.

== History ==
Danish Academy was founded on 28 November 1960 at the initiative of the author Karl Bjarnhof and the art historian Christian Elling with originally 12 members. Apart from Bjarnhof and Elling, they were Kjeld Abell, Karen Blixen, Hans Brix, Thorkild Bjørnvig, H.C. Branner, Agnes Henningsen, Tom Kristensen, Jacob Paludan, Paul V. Rubow and Knud Sønderby. On 28 February 1961 the number was increased to 16 and in 1964 it was changed to a maximum of 20. Jens Smærup Sørensen succeeded Jørn Lund as secretary in 2006.

== Members ==
=== Current members ===
- Benny Andersen
- Torben Brostrøm
- Suzanne Brøgger
- Klaus Høeck
- Ida Jessen
- Pia Juul
- Per Kirkeby
- Svend Åge Madsen
- Peter Laugesen
- Jørn Lund
- Astrid Saalbach
- Jens Smærup Sørensen
- Frederik Stjernfelt
- Pia Tafdrup
- Søren Ulrik Thomsen
- Poul Erik Tøjner
- Per Øhrgaard

=== Former members ===
- F.J. Billeskov Jansen
- Jørgen Gustava Brandt
- Mogens Brøndsted
- Inger Christensen
- Paul Diderichsen
- Otto Gelsted
- Elsa Gress
- Uffe Harder
- William Heinesen
- Poul Henningsen
- Sven Holm
- Erik Knudsen
- Sven Møller Kristensen
- K.E. Løgstrup
- Leif Panduro
- Steen Eiler Rasmussen
- Klaus Rifbjerg
- Ole Sarvig
- Tage Skou-Hansen
- Villy Sørensen
- Ole Wivel
- Erik Aalbæk Jensen

== Awards ==
- Grand Prize of the Danish Academy (Akademiets store Pris) – First time given in 1961. Currently (2012) DKK 300,000
- Selskabet for de skiønne og nyttige Videnskabers Pris – First time given in 1968. Currently (2012) DKK 10,000.
- Otto Gelsted Prize – First time given in 1972. Currently (2012) DDK 65,000.
- Kjeld Abell Prize – First time given in 1976, handed every second or third year. As of 2012, DKK 50,000.
- Klaus Rifbjerg's Debutant Prize – Founded in 1983 by the writer Klaus Rifbjerg. Given for the first time in 1984. It is handed every second year to a poet who has published his or her first collection with the last two years, written in Danish, Faroese or Greenlandic. Currently DDK. 10,000.
- Beatrice Prize (Beatrice-prisen) - Founded in 1983 by Birthe and Paul Beckett. First time handed in 1984. Currently DDK. 50,000.
- Translator's Prize of the Danish Academy (Akademiets oversætterprisen) - First time handed in 1988. Currently DKK. 50,000.
- Hvass Prize (Hvass-prisen) - Has been handed three times: 1997, 1999 and 2001 after agreement with the Hvass Foundation. The prize was DKK. 50,000.
- Silas Prize (Silas-prisen) - Founded in 1999 by author Cecil Bødker. Handed for the first time in 2001. It is to be handed to a notable children's book writer every second year. The prize is currently 100,000.
- The Foundation's Medal (Selskabets Medalje) - Can be given from time to time for a special acknowledgement by the Selskabet til de skønne og nyttige Videnskabers Forfremmelse. It has been handed five times from 1968 to 2006.
- Karen Blixen Medal (Karen Blixen Medaljen) - Founded in 1984, to be handed for the first time on the 100-year birthday of Karen Blixen. It has been handed to seven (from 1985–2012) non-Danish writers as a special acknowledgement.
