= Hans Christian Branner =

20th-century Danish writer

- Born: 23 June 1903; Ordrup, Denmark
- Died: 24 April 1966 (aged 62); Copenhagen, Denmark
- Occupations: novelist; playwright
- Writing career
- Language: Danish
- Notable works: Rytteren (1949); Ingen Kender natten (1955)
- Notable awards: Holberg Medal (1954); Danish Playwrights' Honorary Award (1961)

Hans Christian Branner (23 June 1903 – 24 April 1966) was a Danish novelist, essayist and playwright. He was a leading writer of the post-World War II period in Denmark and a founder member of the Danish Academy. His work dealt with the themes of power, fear and loneliness and earned him several literary awards including De Gyldne Laurbær (1950, for Rytteren), the Holberg Medal (1954) and the Danish Playwrights' Honorary Award (1961).

== Life ==
Hans Christian Branner was born in Ordrup, near Copenhagen, on 23 June 1903. His father Christian Branner, who died when Hans was five, was a headmaster and his maternal grandfather H.C. Frederikson founded the local school (Ordrup Gymnasium). Branner studied philology at the University of Copenhagen and prior to becoming a writer he made an unsuccessful attempt at an acting career which he gave up in 1923 to work for a publishing house. In June 1930 he married Karen Moldrup. He resigned from his job in early 1932 and in September that year he made his literary debut with the a short story published in a magazine. He wrote several radio plays and short stories in the early 1930s before attracting attention with the publication of Legetøj (1936; Toys); a novel set in a toy factory which can be interpreted as an allegorical parallel to events in neighbouring Germany. This was followed in 1937 by his novel Barnet leger ved Stranden (The Child Is Playing by the Beach) and a collection of short stories, Om lidt er vi borte (In a Little While We Are Gone) in 1939. His 1942 novel Historien om Børge was translated into English as The Story of Börge in 1973. In 1944 he published the collection To Minutters Stilhed (Two Minutes of Silence) which was placed at number 42 in the Danish book of the century list produced by Politiken in 1999. In 1944 he also contributed a short story, "Angst", based on his 1942 short story "Trommerne" (The Drums), to the underground publication Der Brænder en Ild (A fire is burning). This collection included works by several notable Danish authors, including Kjeld Abell and Tove Ditlevsen, and was produced illegally due to the German occupation of Denmark. An expanded version of "Angst" was published in 1947.

In 1945 and 1949 Branner translated Franz Kafka's The Trial and The Castle into Danish. The themes used by Kafka are reflected in Rytteren (1949; The Riding Master, 1951); a short novel by Branner that won De Gyldne Laurbær (The Golden Laurel) literary award in 1950. Rytteren became his first stage drama when it was adapted into a play of the same title. As an essayist Branner examined crisis and guilt in his 1950 work Humanismens Krise (The Crisis of Humanism). His concern for humanism would later be the key theme of his 1958 play Thermopylae. In 1952 he wrote the play Søskende (Siblings, translated as The Judge, 1955) which explored the themes of loneliness and fear, and was made into a film of the same name in 1966. He was awarded the Holberg Medal in 1954 and was the recipient of the Drachmannlegatet the following year. In 1955 Branner created "one of Denmark's most effective postwar novels dealing with the German occupation" when he reworked the main themes of "Trommerne" and "Angst" into his novel Ingen Kender natten (translated as No Man Knows the Night, 1958). He was one of the 12 founding members of the Danish Academy in 1960 and was the 1961 recipient of the Danish Playwrights' Honorary Award. Later works included the radio plays Et spil om Kærligheden og døden (A Play on Love and Death; 1960) and Mørket mellem træerne (Darkness Among the Trees; 1965). Ariel, a 1963 collection of short stories, was nominated for the Nordic Council Literature Prize in 1965. Branner died in Copenhagen on 24 April 1966.

== Works ==
Key: essay (E), novel (N), play (P), collection of short stories (SS)

- Legetøj (N; 1936)
- Barnet leger ved Stranden (N; 1937)
- Om lidt er vi borte (SS; 1939)
- Drømmen om en kvinde (1941)
- Historien om Børge (N; 1942)
- To Minutters Stilhed (SS; 1944)
- Rytteren (N, P; 1949, 1950)
- Humanismens Krise (E; 1950)
- Søskende (P; 1952)
- Ingen Kender natten (N; 1955)
- Jeg elsker dig (P; 1956)
- Thermopylae (P; 1958)
- Et spil om Kærligheden og døden (P; 1960)
- Ariel (SS; 1963)
- Mørket mellem træerne (P; 1965)
