= Aage Dons =

Danish author

Aage Bergishagen Dons (19 August 1903 – 20 October 1993) was a Danish writer. He is best known for his novels, De uønskede, Frosten paa Ruderne, and Den svundne tid er ej forbi.

== Life ==
Dons was born on 19 August 1903 in Svanholm, Frederikssund, Denmark to Hans Bergishagen Dons (1849–1930) and Frede Henriette Gottlieb (1869–1957). He had originally studied to be a musician.

Dons made his writing debut in 1932 with Walpurgisnacht, a radioplay which was later released as a book in 1935 along with his first novel Koncerten. The majority of his published works were novels and collections of short stories.

For his writing, Dons was awarded De Gyldne Laurbær and the Kollegernes Ærespris in 1954, Det anckerske Legat in 1956, Herman Bangs Mindelegat in 1959, Drachmannlegatet in 1965, and the Holberg Medal 1966.

He died on 13 October 1993 and is buried at Krogstrup Cemetery.

== Bibliography ==
- Walpurgisnacht (1932)
- Koncerten (1935)
- Soldaterbrønden (1936)
- De uønskede (1938)
- Tro Tjenerinde (1942)
- Den gule Billedbog (1943)
- Frosten paa Ruderne (1948)
- Den svundne tid er ej forbi (1950)
- De aabne Arme (1957)
- Rosa og det bizarre liv (1979)
- Brænde til mit bål (1965)
