= Danish Academy (disambiguation) =

Danish Academy may refer to:

- Danish Academy, founded in 1960
- Royal Danish Academy of Music
- Royal Danish Academy of Sciences and Letters
- Royal Danish Academy of Fine Arts
