= Kjeld Abell Prize =

Danish cultural award

The Kjeld Abell Prize is a Danish cultural award which is handed every second or third year to a person, who has made a great effort for Danish theatre or film.

The prize is handed by the Danish Academy, who runs the Kjeld Abell Memorial Foundation, which was founded just after his death in 1961. The prize is currently 50,000 DDK.

== Recipients ==
- 1976: Jess Ørnsbo
- 1978: Inger Christensen
- 1980: Eugenio Barba
- 1982: Finn Methling
- 1983: Jørgen Leth
- 1985: Ulla Ryum
- 1987: Astrid Saalbach
- 1989: Kirsten Delholm
- 1991: Ernst Bruun Olsen
- 1993: Lars von Trier and Niels Vørsel
- 1995: Jens Kistrup
- 1997: Morti Vizki
- 2000: Peter Asmussen
- 2003: Nullo Facchini
- 2005: Claus Beck-Nielsen
- 2007: Jokum Rohde
- 2009: Line Knutzon
- 2011: Nikoline Werdelin
- 2015: Andreas Garfield
