= Jørn Lund =

Jørn Lund may refer to

- Jørn Lund (cyclist) (born 1942), Danish cyclist.
- Jørn Lund (linguist) (born 1946), Danish professor of linguistics
