= DDH =

DDH may refer to:

- 1,3-Dibromo-5,5-dimethylhydantoin, a chemical also abbreviated as DBDMH
- Ddh (trigraph), a trigraph used in the Dene Suline language for the dental affricate /tθ/
- De Danske Husmoderforeninger, Danish women's organization
- Decisional Diffie–Hellman assumption
- Department of Digital Humanities, at King's College London (formerly Centre for Computing in the Humanities)
- Developmental Dysplasia of the Hip, see Hip dysplasia (human)
- Devonshire Dock Hall, the BAE Systems assembly facility
- Disciples Divinity House, Christian seminary of the University of Chicago
- DDH is hull classification symbol for helicopter carrier or helicopter destroyer
