= Jørgen Sonne =

Jørgen Sonne may refer to:

- Jørgen Sonne (painter) (1801–1890), Danish painter best known for his battle paintings
- Jørgen Sonne (writer) (1925–2015), Danish lyricist and writer
