= Aase Hansen =

Aase Hansen may refer to:

- Aase Hansen (writer) (1893–1981), Danish author and translator
- Aase Hansen (actor) (1935–1993), Danish actor
