= Erling Jepsen =

Danish author and playwright (born 1956)

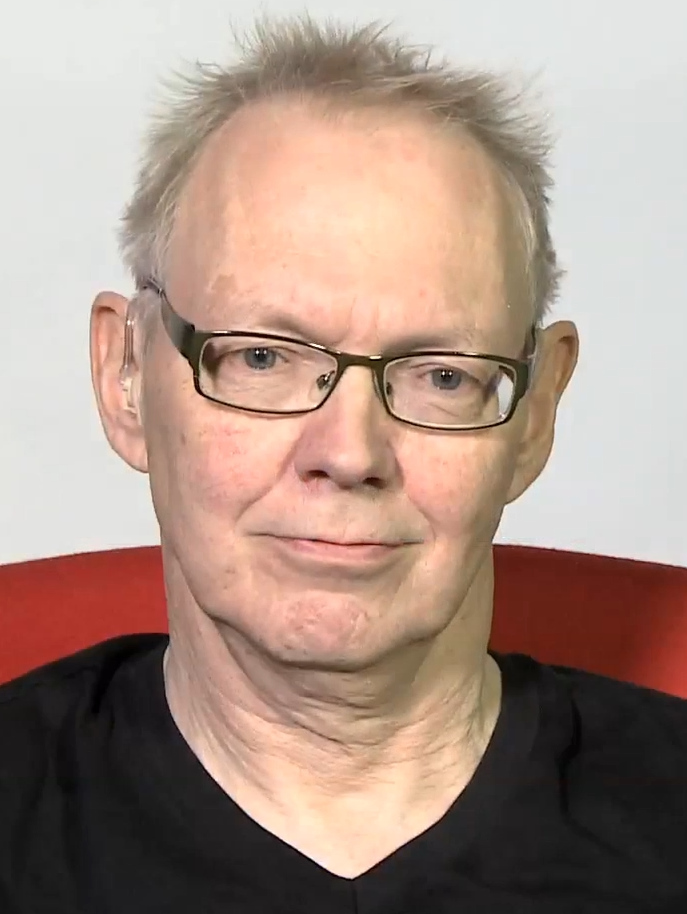
Erling Jepsen (2016)

Erling Jepsen (born 14 May 1956 in Gram, Denmark) is a Danish author and playwright whose output primarily deals with his hometown of Gram and the culture in the surrounding region of Southern Jutland. His novel Frygtelig lykkelig (Terribly Happy) was adapted into the 2008 neo-noir thriller Terribly Happy, and his autobiographical novel Kunsten at Græde i Kor (The Art of Crying) was adapted into the 2006 film The Art of Crying.

Jepsen won the 2004 Holberg Medal for his contributions to Danish drama.

== Selected bibliography ==
- 2002: The Art of Crying in Harmony (Danish: Kunsten at græde i kor) (novel)
- 2004: Terribly Happy (Danish: Frygtelig lykkelig) (novel)
- 2006: With Kind Regards (Danish: Med venlig deltagelse) (novel)
- 2013: The South Jutlandic Farm (Danish: Den sønderjyske farm) (novel)
- 2016: Gram Sea (Danish: Gramhavet) (novel)
