= Sissal Kampmann =

Faroese poet

Sissal Kampmann (born 1974) is a Faroese poet. She grew up in Vestmanna in the Faroe Islands. After finishing the Faroese University-preparatory school (in Faroese called Studentaskúli, in Danish: Gymnasium) in Tórshavn, she moved to Denmark to study Nordic literature at the University of Copenhagen.

She published her first poetry collection in 2011, while living in Copenhagen. The poems were written in Faroese and were published by the Faroese-owned Forlaget Eksil. In September 2012 she received the Klaus Rifbjerg's Debutant Prize.

== Bibliography ==
=== Poems ===
- 2016 - Sunnudagsland, Mentanargrunnur Studentafelgasins
- 2014 - Hyasinttíð, (“Hyacinth time”) Mentanargrunnur Studentafelgasins
- 2013 - 4D. Copenhagen, Forlaget Eksil.
- 2012 - Endurtøkur. Copenhagen, Forlaget Eksil.
- 2011 - Ravnar á ljóðleysum flogi – yrkingar úr uppgongdini. Copenhagen, Forlaget Eksil.

== Prizes and grants ==
- 2013 - One year grant from the Mentanargrunnur Landsins (Faroese Cultural Fund)
- 2012 - Klaus Rifbjerg's Debutant Prize
