= Sven Holm =

Danish author and playwright (1940–2019)

- Born: 13 April 1940
- Died: 11 May 2019 (aged 79)
- Education: Herlufsholm School
- Occupations: Author; playwright
- Writing career
- Notable awards: Grand Prize of the Danish Academy (1974); Holberg Medal (1991); Danish Critics Prize for Literature (2001)

Sven Holm (13 April 1940 – 11 May 2019) was a Danish author and playwright. Holm graduated from Herlufsholm School in 1958. His first short story collection, Den store fjende, was published in 1961. In 1974, Holm was awarded the Grand Prize of the Danish Academy. He was awarded the Holberg Medal in 1991. In 2001, Holm was made a member of the Danish Academy. That same year, he was awarded the Danish Critics Prize for Literature for his short story collection Kanten af himlen.

== Selected works ==
=== Prose ===
- Den store fjende (The great enemy), short story collection, 1961
- Nedstyrtningen (The Crash), short story collection, 1963
- Termush, Atlanterhavskysten (Termush), novel, 1967
- Kanten af himlen (The edge of the sky), short story collection, 2001

=== Drama ===
- Syg og munter (Sick and cheerful)
- Den anden side af Krista X (The other side of Krista X)
- Hr. Henrys begravelse og andre fortællinger (Sir. Henry's funeral and other tales)
- Struensee var her (Struensee was here), 1977
- Schumanns Nat, 2002
