= Hans Hartvig Seedorff =

Danish writer

- Born: 12 August 1892; Aarhus, Denmark
- Died: 19 January 1986 (aged 93); Copenhagen, Denmark

Hans Hartvig Otto Seedorff Pedersen eller Hans Hartvig Seedorff (12 August 1892 in Aarhus – 19 January 1986 in Frederiksberg) was a Danish lyricist and poet. Seedorff debuted with Hyben in 1918 and over the following 7 decades he wrote songs, screenplays and books. He received numerous awards including Ingenio et Arti (1933), the Order of the Dannebrog (1947) and the Holberg Medal (1950).

Seedorff attended the Aarhus Cathedral School and later Marselisborg Gymnasium from which he graduated in 1911. In 1912 he got a degree in philosophy after which he worked as a journalist until he started his writing career in 1916. In 1917 he traveled to Russia as an official diplomat and this became the first of many lengthy trips around the world in the 1920s, making him one of the most traveled Danish writers. In Denmark Seedorff moved from Aarhus to Christianshavn and from there to Tibirke where lived in many years until 1958 when he was given the guest house in Bakkehuset on Frederiksberg in Copenhagen.

Hans Hartvig Seedorff received the literary prize Drachmannlegatet in 1925, the award Ingenio et arti in 1933 and was made a Knight af Dannebrog in 1947.
