= Martin A. Hansen =

Danish writer

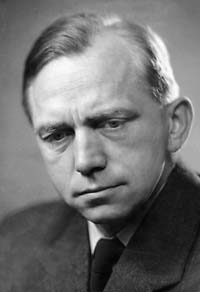
- Born: Alfred Martin Jens Hansen; 20 August 1909; Strøby, Denmark
- Died: 27 June 1955 (aged 45); Copenhagen, Denmark
- Burial place: Allerslev Cemetery, Lejre
- Occupation: Author
- Movement: Danish resistance movement
- Awards: Drachmannlegatet, 1946; De Gyldne Laurbær, 1949; Holberg Medal, 1952

Alfred Martin Jens Hansen (20 August 1909 – 27 June 1955) was a Danish writer who wrote under the name Martin A. Hansen. He is known for his writings as a member of the Danish resistance movement during the German occupation of Denmark in WWII.

Several of his popular works have been translated into English, including: Lucky Kristoffer and The Liar. Hansen was awarded the Drachmannlegatet in 1946, De Gyldne Laurbær in 1949, and the Holberg Medal in 1952.

== Personal life ==
Hansen was born on 20 August 1909 in Strøby, a small town on the Stevns Peninsula in Denmark to Hans Peter Hansen (1878–1945) and Karen Christine Mariane Mathiasen (1885–1982). His father was a tenant farmer and his family had very little means. He had two sisters: Inger Elisabeth (b. 1911) and Karen Bodil (b. 1914).

Hansen attended Haslev Seminarium and passed his examination to be a teacher in 1930. Hansen married Vera Louise Marie Jensen in 1935 and together they had two children: Hans-Ole Hansen, who became head of the Centre for Historical-Archaeological Research and Communication in Lejre, and their daughter Mette-Lise Hansen.

As a young boy, Hansen worked as a farmhand. He was injured in an incident where he fell out of a tree while pruning it and hit his head. He recovered and finished his work, though from then on he was afflicted by migraines. His headaches were treated with aspirin, which he took in large qualities due to their severity.

While at a Nordic literature conference in Stockholm, Hansen accidentally ingested cleaning fluid and was rushed to the hospital to have his stomach pumped. This incident exacerbated the adverse effects on his kidneys caused by his frequent use of aspirin, which eventually resulted in nephritis. He later died in Copenhagen on 27 June 1955, after being hospitalized at Bispebjerg Hospital for chronic nephritis. He is buried alongside his wife at Allerslev Cemetery in Lejre.

== Resistance writings ==
Hansen was deeply affected by the German occupation of Denmark during WWII and was active in the Danish resistance movement. During the occupation, he wrote anonymous articles in the then illegal publication Folk og Frihed (English: People and Freedom). When the publication's editors were arrested he took over, both writing and editing a large part of its contents.

In the summer of 1944, Hansen had been living in a loft near Utterslev Mose. He referred to Utterslev Mose as "the bloody bog" (Danish: den blodige mose) because it was the site of many executions of suspected informants by the Danish resistance. To his dismay, Hansen was tasked with writing in defense of these executions, and he eventually published Dialogue on Murder and Responsibility (Danish: Dialog om drab og ansvar). The dialogue was an eleven-page debate between Socrates and his friend Simmias which justified the executions of suspected informants, though it argued that those performing them should be brought to fair trial afterwards.

Dialogue on Murder and Responsibility was highly controversial, though it inspired many young members of the resistance. Hansen wrote in a 1945 journal entry that he believed at least two young men, encouraged by his writings, had been killed after taking up arms. It was published in Morten Korch's anthology, Der brænder en ild, along with works by other Danish resistance authors, such as Tove Ditlevsen, Hans Kirk, Ole Sarvig, and Halfdan Rasmussen. The anthology was originally published without naming its authors to protect their identities, though their names were released after the war.

Hansen's participation in the resistance movement gained him notoriety, and he became a well known author within Denmark. After the end of the occupation, he continued to debate political ideas as an editor and writer for Heretica. In particular, he argued that the perpetrators of executions during the occupation should be held accountable in a court trial since the Danish government had been restored, but after the war ended the leader of the resistance movement, Frode Jakobsen, made an agreement with the newly reestablished Ministry of Justice which ensured that the executions would not be investigated by the police and the assailants would not be prosecuted. Hansen considered this an injustice and held himself partially responsible for encouraging the executions though his writing at the time. In response, he wrote The Guests (Danish: Gæsterne) a short story told from the perspective of an author who, like Hansen himself, had written a justification of extrajudicial killings. In the story, a man shows up on the narrator's doorstep with the body of a man he had executed. The visitor holds the author accountable for the man's death because he felt encouraged to perform the act after reading the author's work. Hansen had written The Guests in June 1955 while hospitalized, and because of his illness, he often lost consciousness while writing. He died just two weeks after he had finished the short story.

== Works ==
Hansen's debut novel Nu opgiver han was published in 1935. The story depicts a farming community on the island of Zealand and their progressing disillusionment with life. These themes were continued in his 1937 novel Kolonien. His 1941 novel, Jonathans Rejse, follows Jonathan Smed as he outwits the devil by trapping him in a bottle and embarks to deliver him to his king. Through the course of his journey, the narrator is caught up in the struggle between good and evil and is confronted by the ambiguous and many faces of evil in his own world.

Lucky Kristoffer (Danish: Lykkelig Kristoffer) was published in 1945, shortly before Denmark was liberated at the end of WWII. The novel is set during the Count's Feud and narrated by a shopkeeper named Martin. Over the course of the story, Martin recounts his younger years traveling with Kristoffer, a young idealist who dedicated his life to protecting others as a knight and eventually died for his beliefs. As is characteristic of confessional writing, the narrator is forced to admit that while his lack of ideals had kept him safe, it made Kristoffer a more courageous man than he had been.

In 1946, just after the end of WWII, Hansen published Tornebusken, a collection of short stories which addressed the darkness of the postwar atmosphere and attempted to derive meaning from the death and suffering caused by the war. The work's three stories include: ”Tornebusken,” ”Midsommerfesten,” and ”Septembertaagen.” In 1947, Hansen published Agerhønen, a collection of 12 short stories. Several of the stories in the collection drew upon to his own childhood experiences and centered on themes of life, death, and resurrection. His final collection of short stories, Paradisæblerne og andre historier, was published in 1953.

Hansen was commissioned by Danmarks Radio to write a story to be read over the air and he eventually produced his novel The Liar (Danish: Løgneren). It was written as a series of diary entries from the perspective of Johannes Vig, an unreliable narrator and anti-hero who lies and manipulates the people close to him. The story follows Vig and his life on the island of Sandø in post-war Denmark. The first section was narrated by actor Pouel Kern and aired over the radio in 1950. The novel was later released as a serial in the Danish newspaper Berlingske, and eventually published as a book in its entirety. In 1970, the work was converted into a film, which was written and directed by Knud Leif Thomsen.

His 1952 novel, Orm og Tyr, details Scandinavia's transition from Norse paganism to Christianity and the duality of the region's resulting traditions. The novel's title is a reference to a legend in which a snake wraps itself around a village's church and the villagers are forced to raise a bull to fight it off. In the legend, the bull defeats the snake but is poisoned by its venom and dies on the steps in front of the church once the villagers regain access to their place of worship.

== Bibliography ==
Hansen wrote a variety of essays, short stories, and novels which have been published in various forms and translated from their original Danish. In addition, many of his letters and journal entries have been published posthumously.

- Nu opgiver han, 1935
- Kolonien, 1937
- Jonathans rejse, 1941
- Lucky Kristoffer (Danish: Lykkelige Kristoffer), 1945
- Tornebusken, 1946
- Agerhønen, 1947
- Tanker i en Skorsten, 1948
- Åsynet, 1949
- Sankt Hans aften, 1949
- The Liar (Danish: Løgneren), 1950
- Leviathan, 1950
- Paradisæblerne og andre historier, 1953
- Orm og Thyr (with Sven Havsteen-Mikkelsen), 1953
- Kringen (travelogue of Norway), 1953
- Dansk vejr (illustrations by Ernst Clausen), 1953
- Konkylien, 1955

Posthumous compilations:

- Efterslæt: sidste noveller og skildringer, 1959
- Against the wind: stories, 1979
- For folkets frihed, 2018
