= Let Time Pass =

1986 novel by Svend Aage Madsen

- Author: Svend Aage Madsen
- Original title: Lad tiden gå
- Language: Danish
- Genre: Novel
- Publisher: Gyldendal
- Publication date: 1986
- Publication place: Denmark
- Pages: 194
- ISBN: 978-87-00-47524-3
- OCLC: 23378020

Lad tiden gå (English: Let time pass) is a 1986 science fiction novel by Danish modernist writer Svend Aage Madsen. The novel focuses on one of the central themes in Madsen's writing - the nature of time. Like most of Madsen's novels it hasn't been published in English.

This novel is a typical example of the third phase in Madsen's writing that's like most of his later works is set in the town of Aarhus and has several characters that also appear in his other books (Johanna, Sverre). It also has another typical feature of Madsen's books - a complicated timeline of the novel having chapters describing overlapping periods of time.

== Plot summary ==
Johanna who is a lector at a Danish university gets involved by her colleague professor Jeyde in a time travel experiment. Jeyde has discovered that he can put the time 23 days back. The background to the invention is that Jeyde perceives the time as split up into small sets, among which time stands calm.

Jeyde compares his theory with films, where every second 24 still pictures are shown. If you happen to cut the time "tape" the world gets rewound to the previous secure point (which would be 23 days before the moment of the cut). The problem that Jeyde has encountered is that after the time cut neither he nor anybody else can notice that there was a cut because everything that happened between the safe point and the cut is erased from their memories as it never had happened (and theoretically it hasn't happened indeed). He can't even be sure about any event whether it's the first time it's happening or not.

To be able to understand the possibilities of his invention better, Jeyde sends Johanna to a psychiatrist who "opens up her mind" so after a time cut she'd be able to remember the destroyed time. When Johanna gets tired of being repeatedly sent by Jeyde back in time (since Jeyde sends back the entire Universe and not just Johanna he doesn't need Johanna's participation or agreement to send her back) she manages to lock Jeyde up in a psychiatric hospital and wants to leave time travelling behind her, but then she suddenly realises how much freedom it can give her.

This way Johanna gets the unique chance to outplay different variations of her relationship with Sverre, one of her students, as she can always correct a mistake that she has made. Another bonus she gets is in no need to spend time tidying up at home because she can always come back to a time when everything was still clean. However she quickly discovers that too much knowledge about upcoming events tends to make things more complicated. Her relationship with Sverre cannot recommence from where they left off and she has trouble remembering which events are real and which are fictional in any given situation. Finally she decides that the only solution to let time flow normally is for her to first kill Jeyde and then herself.
