= Johannes Møllehave =

Danish theologian (1937–2021)

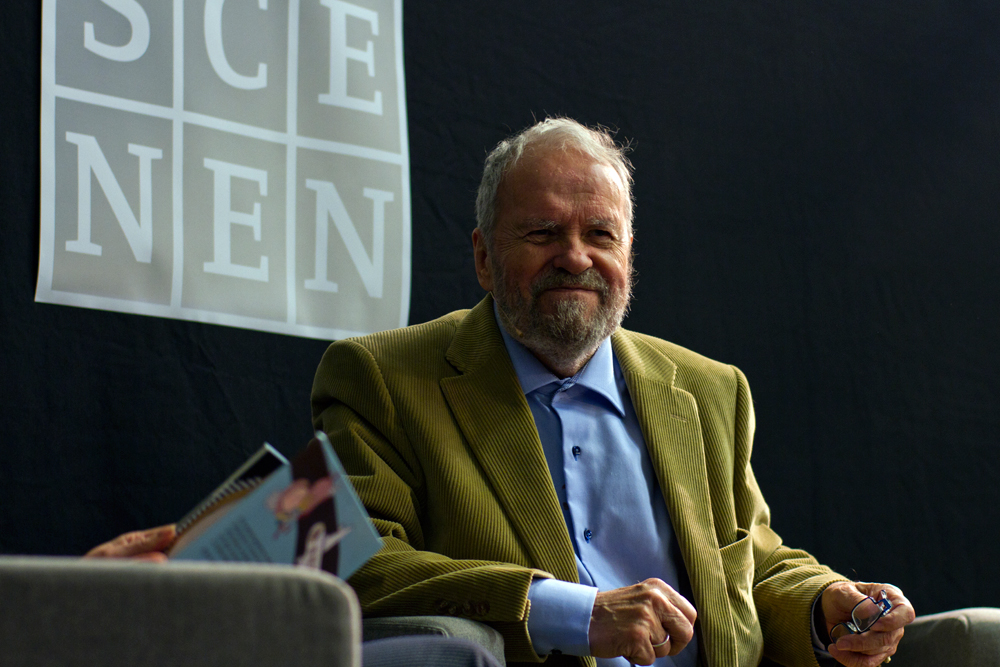
Johannes Møllehave in 2011

Johannes Volf Møllehave (4 January 1937 – 10 May 2021) was a Danish Lutheran priest, author, and lecturer.

== Education and career ==
Møllehave was born in Frederiksberg. He graduated in theology in 1963. His wide range of interests extended to some 40 different topics but he was particularly well known for his interest in Søren Kierkegaard, H. C. Andersen and Storm P.

== Awards and prizes ==
He won a number of Danish awards for his down-to-earth presentations of Danish authors and philosophers and his command of his mother tongue. These included:

- 1979 De Gyldne Laurbær (The Golden Laurel, which is the Danish booksellers annual award)
- 1980 Author of the year (Årets forfatter)
- 1986 H.C. Andersen prize (H.C. Andersen-prisen)
- 1993 Children's author of the year (Årets børnebogsforfatter)
- 1994 Favourite Danish author (Danskernes yndlingsforfatter)
- 1997 Drachmannlegatet
- 2005 Danish mother tongue award (Modersmål-Prisen)

== Bibliography ==
=== In English ===
Most of Møllehave's publications are in Danish. The following is in English:

- A Folk Legend / illustrated by Her Majesty Queen Margrethe of Denmark; retold by Johannes Møllehave (translated from the Danish Et folke sagn, based on the ballet Et folke sagn / August Bournonville), 1854. Sesam, c. 1992, ISBN 87-7801-026-8

=== In Danish ===
- På myrens fodsti (1975)
- Op ad en mur (1976)
- Til glædens Gud (1977)
- Livsfangerne (1977)
- Da glæden blev født (1977)
- Så forskellige sind (1978)
- Læsehest med æselører (1979)
- Så forskellige sind (1979)
- Den livsild som forbrænder (1979)
- Huset vi bor i (1980)
- Tusind fluer med eet smæk (1982)
- De hellige tre konger (1982)
- En fri mand (1982)
- Den barmhjertige samaritan (1983)
- Til trøst (1983)
- H.C. Andersens salt (1985)
- La Fontaines fabler (translation) (1985)
- Skuffelser der ikke gik i opfyldelse (1987)
- Filosofiske fluer (1988)
- Holger Danskes Vej 60 (1989)
- Kan den, som kan lægge to og to sammen (1990)
- Retur til Waterloo (1991)
- Kærlighed og dæmoni (1992)
- Drengen der kom hen hvor peberet gror (1993)
- Min allerførste bilel (1995)
- Alle Børns bibel (1996)
- Hvor kærlighed bor (1997)
- Kaspers store opdagelse (1997)
- Da alting blev anderledes (1997)
- Glædestårer – om humorens salt (1998)
- Den nøgne zebra (1999)
- Rikke og Ivan den Grusomme (1999)
- Som en springende hval – velsignelser og forbavselser (2000)
- Hvor kærlighed bor (2000)
- Huskesedler fra en glemmebog (2000)
- Vor tids tid (2001)
- Mit livs vennepunkter (2001)
- Kristendom fra a til å (2002)
- Møllehave læser H.C. Andersen (2003)
- Hvordan skal vi nå frem til jul? (2003)
- Ord på samvittigheden (2004)
- Kattenes ABC (2004)
- Møllehave læser Storm P. (2005)
- Mit eventyr (2005)
- Møllehave om glæden ved at læse (2006)
- Yndlingsdigte (cd & dvd) (2007)
- Man kan ikke føre solen bag lyset (2007)
- Det skal råbes fra tagene (2007)
- Indtryk og udtryk (2007)
- Hver dag af øjeblikkets blomst (2007)
- Før- og eftertanker (2008)
- Historien om julen (2008)
- Målbevidste svinkeærinder (2009)
- Digte til livet (cd & dvd) (2010)
- Livets gave (2011)
- Det er (ikke) lige mig (2011)
- Hellere forrykt end forgæves (2011)
- Rim på udsatte steder (2011)
- Historien om den heldige kartoffel (2011)
- Stur, stur nummer! (2012)
- Møllehave fortæller bibelhistorier (2012)
- Femoghalvfjerds fy- og fyndord – fra fødselaren (2012)
- En himmerlandsk mundfuld (2012)
- Tak for ilden (2013)
