= Out of Words =

Upcoming video game

- Developers: Kong Orange, WiredFly
- Publisher: Epic Games Publishing
- Director: Johan Oettinger
- Platforms: Nintendo Switch 2; PlayStation 5; Windows; Xbox Series X/S
- Release: 2027
- Genres: Platform, adventure
- Mode: Multiplayer

Out of Words is an upcoming cooperative platform adventure game developed by Kong Orange and WiredFly, and published by Epic Games. It was announced during the Summer Game Fest 2025.

== Gameplay ==
Out of Words is a cooperative platform adventure game that features two-player collaboration. Players control Kurt and Karla as they explore the fictional world of Vokabulantis, using teamwork to traverse handcrafted environments and solve puzzles.

The game supports both local couch co-op and online cross-platform multiplayer. Gameplay includes physics-based puzzles, timing-oriented platforming sequences, and cooperative interactions with the environment. The setting includes stylized locations such as ancient catacombs and clay-built skyscrapers, requiring coordination and communication between players to advance.

Visual elements in the game, including character models and environments, are created using stop-motion animation techniques intended to produce a tactile, handcrafted aesthetic.

== Plot ==
Players follow the story of Kurt and Karla, two characters who have lost their voices. As they journey through the fantastical world of Vokabulantis, they confront obstacles that test their relationship and communication. The narrative explores themes of emotional connection, cooperation, and identity, as the characters work together to restore their ability to speak and understand one another.

The plot focuses on the characters’ shared quest to recover their voices and navigate their relationship amid growing challenges in their environment. The game presents a metaphorical exploration of language, love, and the difficulties of communication in the modern world.

== Development ==
The game is being developed by Danish game development studios Kong Orange and WiredFly, directed by Johan Oettinger of WiredFly, with concepts developed together with poet Morten Søndergaard. The animation and visuals draw heavily on physical puppetry and handcrafted sets.

The game was revealed on June 8, 2025, during Summer Game Fest. Out of Words is scheduled to release in early 2027 for Microsoft Windows via Epic Games Store, PlayStation 5, and Xbox Series X/S. Since the release of the Nintendo Switch 2, the game has also appeared on the official Nintendo Store.

== Reception ==
Media outlets including IGN, GameSpot, GamesRadar, and GameRant, positively covered the announcement, praising its unique visual style and thematic depth.

Out of Words has drawn comparisons to other narrative co-op games such as It Takes Two and Journey due to its emotional storytelling and cooperative mechanics.

Hideo Kojima, director of Death Stranding 2, publicly praised the game, calling it "simple, gentle, and beautiful" and stated it was the kind of game needed "in an age where we've lost the true meaning of 'words' on social media."
