= Gittes monologer =

Gittes monologer (Gitte's Monologues) is a collection of poems by the Danish poet Per Højholt. Originally published in 1984, these satirical and political poems are construed as Gitte's monologues, addressed to her friend Susanne.
