= Thit Jensen =

Danish writer (1876–1957)

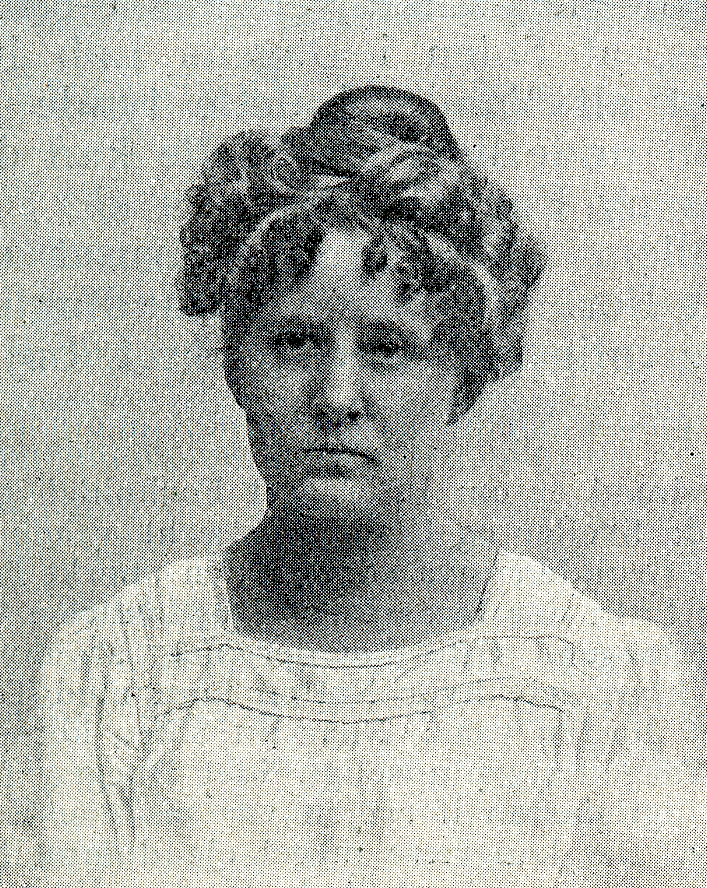
- Born: Maria Kirstine Dorothea Jensen; 19 January 1876; Farsø, Jutland, Denmark
- Died: 14 May 1957 (aged 81); Bagsværd, Denmark
- Occupation: Writer
- Writing career
- Notable awards: Tagea Brandt Rejselegat (1935); Holberg Medal (1940)

Maria Kirstine Dorothea Jensen (19 January 1876 – 14 May 1957) was a Danish novelist and author who wrote under the name Thit Jensen. She is known for her short stories, plays, and socially-critical articles.

For her writing, Jensen was honored with the Drachmannlegatet in 1930, the Tagea Brandt Rejselegat in 1935, and with the Holberg Medal in 1940. She was awarded the Royal Medal of Recompense in 1949 and was inducted as a member of the Order of the Dannebrog in 1954.

== Life ==
Jensen was born on January 19, 1876, in Farsø. Her parents, Hans Jensen, a veterinarian, and Marie Kirstine Jensen had eleven children. Her brother, Johannes V. Jensen, was also a well known author and Nobel Prize Laureate.

In 1912, she married Gustav Jéhan Fenger (1887–1958), though the couple divorced in 1918.

She wrote about erotic and social themes and fought for women's rights. In 1917, she founded Københavns Husmoderforening (Copenhagen Housewives Association) which preceded De Danske Husmoderforeninger and represented the local associations of the organization in Denmark. In 1924 she founded Foreningen for Seksuel Oplysning (English: the Organization for Sexual Awareness) which worked with Jonathan Leunbach to perform abortions. She was personally against abortion, but felt that women needed to have a choice and was highly criticized for this belief.

Jensen died on May 14, 1957, in Bagsværd and is buried at Farsø Cemetery.

== Bibliography ==
- To Søstre (1903)
- Martyrium (1905)
- Prins Nilaus af Danmark (1907)
- Højeste Ret (1913)
- Stærkere end Tro (1915)
- Jydske Historier (1916)
- Gerd - det tyvende Aarhundredes Kvinde (1918)
- Den erotiske Hamster (1919)
- Frivilligt Moderskab (1924)
- Aphrodite fra Fuur: den moderne kvindes udviklingshistorie (1925)
- Børnebegrænsning. Hvorfor - hvordan? (1926)
- Storken (1929)
- Jørgen Lykke: rigens sidste ridder (1931)
- Nial den Vise (1934)
- Stygge Krumpen (1936)
- Romanserien om Valdemar Atterdag, Drotten, Rigets arving og Atter det skilte (1940-1953)
- Erindringerne Hvorfra? Hvorhen? (1950)
- Den sidste Valkyrie (1954)
