= The Ungodly Farce =

2002 novel by Svend Aage Madsen

- Author: Svend Aage Madsen
- Original title: Den ugudelige farce
- Language: Danish
- Genre: Novel
- Publisher: Gyldendal
- Publication date: 2002
- Publication place: Denmark
- Media type: Print
- Pages: 185
- ISBN: 87-02-01824-1
- OCLC: 249597729

Den ugudelige farce (English: The Ungodly Farce) is a 2002 novel by Danish writer Svend Aage Madsen. Like most of Madsen's novels it hasn't been published in English.

== Plot summary ==
The novel's protagonist is Jesper Fegge, a young jazz enthusiast and wannabe writer who after meeting an American woman named Mabel and hitting his head several times loses his unconscious mind. This means in the book that Jesper can't make any decisions unconsciously anymore and it also gives him the ability to see various outcomes of every decision he makes or doesn't make. So at the beginning of the book he either can take his violin or his typewriter to America because of the size of his bag and this decision affects all his future life. Over the course of the novel Jesper can get married and settle down, found a new religion, get beaten up repeatedly, commit adultery, search for the meaning of life and do various other things. Some of the people with whom he interacts in various paths of his life can also sense their complicated relations with Jesper. In the end he has to choose a path of his life that would do the least harm.

== Writing style ==
Since the book concerns with alternate possible realities some parts of it can't be read in the traditional order. Several chapters are alternate takes on the same event with different actions from Jesper or other characters. Those are printed either one after another, with Jesper sometimes in the middle of the chapter already deciding that he wouldn't be taking this path, in other cases the variations are printed one next to another in parallel columns or even the versions are mixed between the lines of the text. The most explicit example of parallel stories technique is used in the chapter where Jesper visits a psychologist and splits his story in four different variations.

== Genre classification ==
Despite the contents which could imply The Ungodly Farce being a science fiction novel, in fact it isn't science fiction at all. It could be better described as a partly comical free jazz piece in the form of novel - with several themes coming up repeatedly in different parts of the novel and transforming into something different again and again. The real jazz saxophonist Charlie Parker and his fictional follower Linus form one of the innumerable subplots of the novel.
