= Morten Søndergaard =

Danish writer and poet (born 1964)

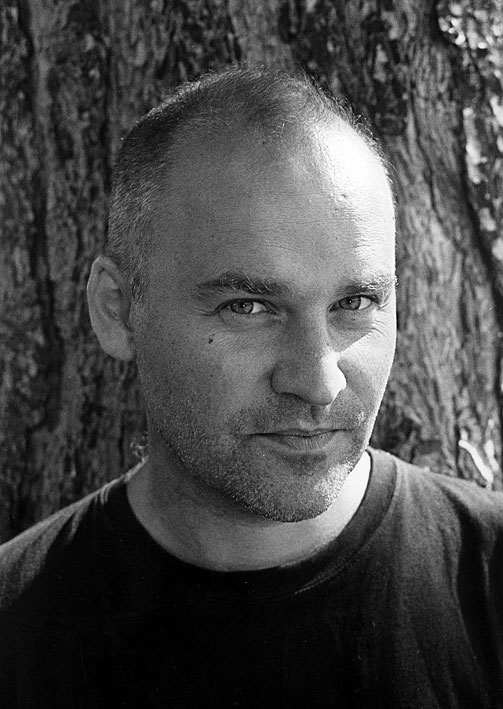
Morten Søndergaard at the Nordic Council Literature Prize 2007

Morten Søndergaard (3 October 1964) is a Danish poet. In addition to his poetry he has published short prose, lyrical prose, novels, been a translator and editor, and worked with language and poetry in installation art and sound.

== Life ==
Morten Søndergaard was born in Copenhagen and grew up in Hjallese in Odense and graduated from Tornbjerg Gymnasium in 1984. From 1989 to 1991 he attended the Danish Writer's school (Forfatterskolen) in Copenhagen and obtained his MA in comparative literature at the University of Copenhagen in 1995. From 2002 to 2008 he co-edited the literary magazine Hvedekorn with Tomas Thøfner, and also co-founded the poetry magazine Øverste Kirurgiske (Upper surgery). In 2003 and again in 2007 he was nominated for the Nordic Council Literature Prize. He has since 1998 been living in Italy, first in the town Vinci, Tuscany, then in Pietrasanta. Søndergaard used his time in Italy as the basis for two of his works, Vinci, Senere and Processen og det halve kongerige.

Morten Søndergaard is married to Anna Maria Orrù and they live in Pietrasanta, Italy.

Morten Søndergaard plays for the Danish authors national football team.

Several of his works have been published abroad and translated into English, Swedish, Italian, Norwegian, German, Arabic and French.

Since 2018, Morten Søndergaard has been working on the development of the computer game Out of Words in collaboration with Danish game studio Kong Orange and animation studio Wired Fly Animation.

== The Poetic project ==
With his poems, Morten Søndergaard aspire to capture the world through his poetry. Danish Literary critic Lars Bukdahl has called Søndergaard's poetry "romantic encyclopaedism" in his work Generationsmaskinen (can be translated into: The Generation Machine), and since his debut Sahara i mine hænder (can be translated into: Sahara in my hands) from 1992, Søndergaard's poetry has dealt with everything from the smallest to the largest things in the universe - from quarks to solar systems.

In a poem from his 2005 collection Et skridt i den rigtige retning (translation: A Step in the Right Direction), Morten Søndergaard writes directly: "The ambition is to gather everything in one poem". Such reflections on his own writing practice also permeate several of Morten Søndergaard's poetic works. Here, he describes letters as windows to the world (for example in Døden er en del af mit navn, 2016 - translation: Death is part of my name), or language as doors to things in the universe (as in Til, 2023 - translation: To):

"My poems are doors

I go through

to be found by the writing

like finding a tool

that fits the task and something clicks."

Morten Søndergaard has also realized his poetry out into the physical world through music, marble tiles with carved poems, a physical word pharmacy, poems on walls, gravestones and as objects in physical spaces such as "The new room" in the museum Bakkehuset in Frederiksberg, Denmark.

This culminated in the encyclopaedic conversation book The new room from 2022, where each text deals with everything from science, language, philosophy, poems and much more that can form the basis for conversations between people.

== Work ==
Søndergaard debuted in 1992 with Sahara i mine hænder (Sahara in my hands). His breakthrough to a wider audience came in 1998 with Bier dør sovende (Bees die sleeping). Based on his experiences living in and coming back to Italy, the poetry collection Vinci, Senere (Vinci, Later; 2002), deals with the subjects of time and movement. These themes are expanded in the collection Et skridt i den rigtige retning, (A step in the right direction, 2005), which explores the relation between walking and poetry. In the poetical narrative Processen og det halve kongerige (The process and half the kingdom, 2010), Søndergaard again returns to his time in Italy, and to his childhood, this time focusing on perception and the senses.

In his poetry, Søndergaard "lets the world intrude and enrich the imagination, so that new, surreal and hyper-real images emerge – with a different outlook on the world as a result. Not quite without humour". His books have been translated into Arabic, English, German, French, Italian, Swedish and Serbian.

While Søndergaard primarily works as a poet, he has also branched out into numerous other media. He has thus created a series of exhibitions and installations, as well as having produced both musical and dramatic works. The sensorial nature of his poetry and the physical nature of some of his other works thus combine to bring poetry and world closer together. In the artist's own words: "I try to approach both poetry and world by making the two phenomena collide and then see what happens.". He has also translated several works by Jorge Luis Borges into Danish.

Søndergaards Ordapotek (Wordpharmacy) is a concrete poetical work, which equates the structure of language with pharmaceutical products. This poetic experiment consists of ten boxes of medicines, one for each word class, such as verbs, nouns or adverb. A leaflet in each package explains the dangers of overdose and the like. For example, the leaflet for Pronouns explains: "Use Pronouns once a day. Drink plenty of water. After the first week you can increase the number of Pronouns used to as much as 2 Pronouns daily, depending on what has been agreed with the others. You can use Pronouns any time of day, by itself or together with a meal. Pronounce Pronouns loudly and clearly. Do not chew them.".

An important part of Søndergaard's cross-aesthetic project is his work with sound and music, which has resulted in works such as Hjertets abe sparker sig fri, a CD project he released in collaboration with the duo Schweppenhäuser/Thomsen.

In the same spirit, he has curated a series of exhibitions and installations, and has also written dramatic pieces. In this way, the sensual in his poems and the physical in his other artistic endeavours meet in an attempt to bring poetry and the world closer together. In the artist's own words: "I try to approach both poetry and world by making the two phenomena collide and then see what happens" ("I try to approach both poetry and world by making the two phenomena collide and then see what happens", in an interview with 3AM Magazine).

Søndergaard has also experimented with how the material on which a text is written affects the text, including writing memorial notes in marble. In 2014, a gravestone for a certain "Andreas Morgenrødt - time traveller" with the dates 1996 - 2064 appeared at The Assistens Cemetery. It was a curiosity for a while, but in 2016 Søndergaard admitted that Andreas Morgenrødt was an anagram of his own name and he himself was the man behind the installation. This culminated in 2024 with the publication of his work Æon by Hermen & Frudit.

Søndergaard’s explorations of the various collisions between meaning and materiality has resulted in extra-linguistic works that span sound art, artists books, asemic writing strategies and performance. His artistic practice unfolds around explorations and challenges of what poetry can be and is, and how it can subsist in the breaches and connections between signs and things.

== Bibliography ==
=== In Danish ===
- 1992: Sahara i mine hænder (poetry)
- 1994: Ild og tal (poetry)
- 1996: Ubestemmelsessteder (short prose)
- 1998: Hypoteser for to stemmer (with Tomas Thøfner)
- 1998: Bier dør sovende (poetry)
- 2000: Tingenes orden (novel)
- 2002: Vinci, senere (poetry)
- 2004: Fedtdigte (poetry)
- 2004: At holde havet tilbage med en kost (essays)
- 2005: Et skridt i den rigtige retning (poetry)
- 2009: Må sort dreng dø ren (poetry)
- 2010: Processen og det halve kongerige (poetry)
- 2012: Ordapotek (book object)
- 2013: Fordele og ulemper ved at udvikle vinger (poetry)
- 2015: Suture (drawings)
- 2016: Døden er en del af mit navn (poetry)
- 2017: I say stone or flower
- 2017: Ukend dig selv
- 2017: Fra i dag - Samlede digte 1992-2017
- 2019: Journal 2019
- 2020: Et forsøg på at aflytte et sted i paris
- 2020: Intet er nok
- 2022: Den nye hjørnestue
- 2023: TIL
- 2024: Superorganisme - en bi-historie
- 2024: Æon - under the pseudonym Andreas Morgenrødt

=== Re-enactments ===
- 2019: Gilgamesh - translated by Sophus Helle
- 2022: Hafez - Fra vinhus til paradis - translated by Hamid Tadayoni og Shëkufe Tadayoni Heiberg

=== Translations in English ===
- 2005: An Inherited Ocean
- 2006: Vinci, later
- 2012: A step in the right direction
- 2012: Wordpharmacy

=== Dramatic works ===
- 2000: Site Seeing Zoom, Hotel Pro Forma
- 2007: Orfeus remix, musik Bo Lundby Jæger, den fynske opera
- 2010: Ellen, Hotel Pro Forma

=== Exhibitions ===
- 2006: Et skridt i den rigtige retning, i samarbejde med Elisabeth Topsø, Gammel Holtegaard
- 2010: LOVE – en udstilling om sproget, i samarbejde med WeArePopular, Nikolaj Kunsthal
- 2012: Bakkehusalfabetet
- 2016: Sound of my room, Galleri Tom Christoffersen
- 2017: Wall of Dreams, Poetry International and London Literature Festival
- 2017: Ukend dig selv, Brandts13
- 2019: Sproghospitalet, i samarbejde med Helle Brøns, Sorø Kunstmuseum
- 2022: Den nye hjørnestue, Bakkehuset
- 2024: Superorganisme – en bi-historie, Munkeruphus - sammen med en række andre kunstnere

=== Discography ===
- 1992: Random Rooms, LP, i samarbejde med Niels Lyngsø, Olufsens Records
- 2000: Kompas (with Tommy Gregersen)
- 2001: Turbo remix
- 2006: AudioPoesi - Superpositionsprincippet
- 2007: Hjertets abe sparker sig fri (with Jakob Schweppenhäuser and Emil Thomsen)
- 2015: The sound of my room
- 2019/2020: Speos, m. Thomsen/Schweppenhaüser, sten, 2019, Lp, KørFirs Records

== Prizes and Grants ==
- Aarestrup-medaljen, 2020
- Drachmannlegatet, 2020
- Received a lifetime grant from Danish Arts Council 2014
- Morten Nielsens Legat, 2008
- Harald Kidde og Peder Jensen Kjærgaards Fond 2008
- Beatrice Prize, 2006 (Pia Tafdrups tale for Morten Søndergaard ved overrækkelsen)
- Peter Freuchens Mindelegat, 2003
- Michael Strunge Prize, 1998
- Received the three-years grant from Danish Arts Council for the period 1997-1999
