= Per Højholt =

Danish poet

Per Højholt (22 July 1928 – 15 October 2004) was a Danish poet. Højholt had his debut in 1948 when he published "De nøgne" (The Naked Ones), a series of poems which appeared in the magazine Heretica. His first collection was Hesten og solen, featuring religiously inspired poems. A major work came with Poetens hoved (The Head of the Poet) which appeared in 1963. This collection took a Modernist stance and meant a break with late Symbolism. Although a highly experimental and unorthodox writer, he became a popular poet. This is not least due to Gittes monologer (Gitte's Monologues). He toured the country with his recitals of these monologues which received considerable attention.

Højholt was awarded "Den store pris" from the Danish Academy in 1982 and the Holberg Medal in 1997. A recognized writer, he was included in the Danish Culture Canon in 2006 for the poem, "Personen på toppen".

Højholt was a librarian by profession and worked as such until 1966.

== Works ==
- Hesten og solen – Wivel, 1949. Collection of poems
- Skrift paa vind og vand – Schønberg, 1956. Collection of poems
- Poetens hoved – Schønberg, 1963. Collection of poems
- Provinser – Schønberg, 1964. Collection of poems and photographs
- Show – Schønberg, 1966. Collection of poems
- Min hånd 66 – Schønberg, 1966. Collection of poems
- Cézannes metode – Schønberg, 1967
- Turbo – Schønberg, 1968. Collection of poems.
- +1 – Schønberg, 1969. Collection of poems.
- 6512 – Schønberg, 1969.
- Digte – Pax, 1970. Selected poems from: Poetens hoved, Min hånd 66, Show, and Turbo
- Punkter – Schønberg, 1971. Collection of poems
- Intethedens grimasser : essays – Schønberg, 1972.
- Volumen – Schønberg, 1974. Photo collage
- Praksis, Band 1 : Revolver – Gyldendal, 1977. Collection of poems
- Praksis, Band 2 : Groteskens område – Gyldendal, 1978. Collection of poems
- Praksis, Band 3 : Den fireogtresindstyvende frokost i det grønne – Gyldendal, 1979
- Smerteskolen og andre digte – Jorinde & Joringel, 1979
- Enhjørningens kvababbelser – Edition After hand, 1980. Collection of poems
- Praksis, Band 4 : Lynmuseet og andre blindgyder – Gyldendal, 1982. Short story
- Digte 1963-79 – Schønberg, 1982
- Praksis, Band 5 : Nuet druknet i latter – Gyldendal, 1983. Short story
- Gittes monologer og andre kvababbelser – Edition After hand, 1983. Collection of poems
- Gittes monologer : samlet udgave – Schønberg, 1984
- Voldtag stilheden – Centrum, 1985
- Salamanderen – Edition After Hand, 1985
- Praksis, Band 6 : Salamanderen og andre blindgyder – Gyldendal, 1986. Short story
- Praksis, Band 7 : Hundekunstneren og andre blindgyder – Gyldendal, 1988. Short story
- Praksis, Band 8 : Album, tumult – Gyldendal, 1989. Short prose texts
- Praksis, Band 9 : Det gentagnes musik – Gyldendal, 1989. Collection of poems
- Kvababbelser (blindskrift, braille) – Danmarks Blindebibliotek, 1989. Collection of poems
- Jysk til rejsebrug – Band 3 – Thor Breweries, 1991
- Praksis, Band 10 : Manøvrer – Gyldendal, 1993. Collection of poems
- Stenvaskeriet og andre stykker – Gyldendal, 1994. Essays
- Praksis, Band 11 : Lynskud – Gyldendal, 1995. Collection of poems
- Praksis, Band 12 : Anekdoter – Gyldendal, 1996
- Jeg vil ikke stå i vejen for kaos : Per Højholts forfatterskab – Munksgaard, 1998
- Udsatte egne – det er mig : samtaler med Per Højholt – Borgen, 1998
- Der Kopf des Poeten : Gedichte, Essays und eine CD – Straelener Manuskripte Verlag, 1998
- Den tydelige solsort – Husets Forlag, 1999. Collection of poems
- Auricula – Gyldendal, 2001. Roman
- Hans Henrik Mattesen – En monografi – Gyldendal, 2007
