= Pia Juul =

Danish poet (1962–2020)

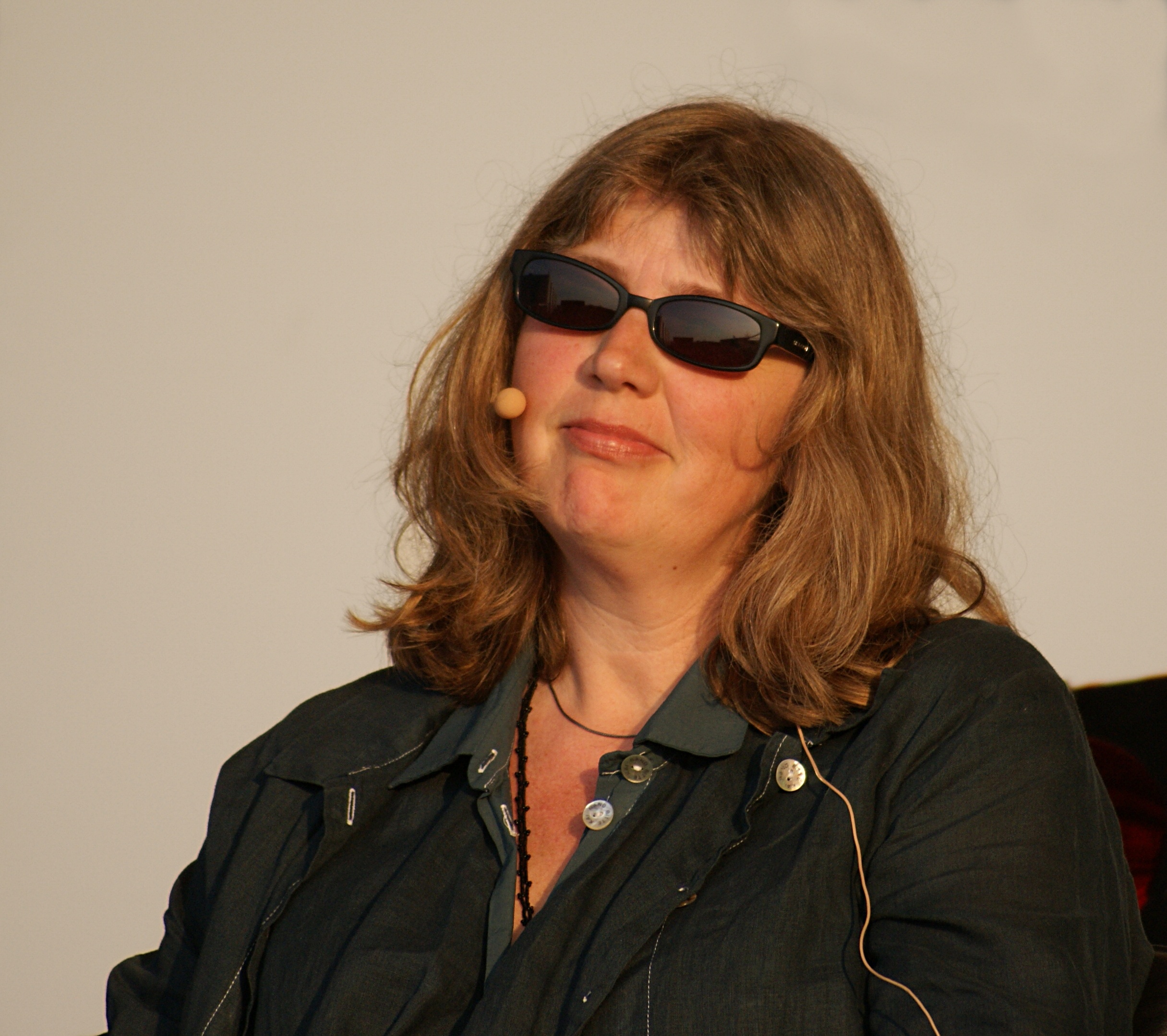
- Juul in 2010
- Born: Pia Elisabeth Juul; 30 May 1962; Korsør, Zealand, Denmark
- Died: 30 September 2020 (aged 58)
- Occupations: Writer, translator
- Writing career
- Language: Danish

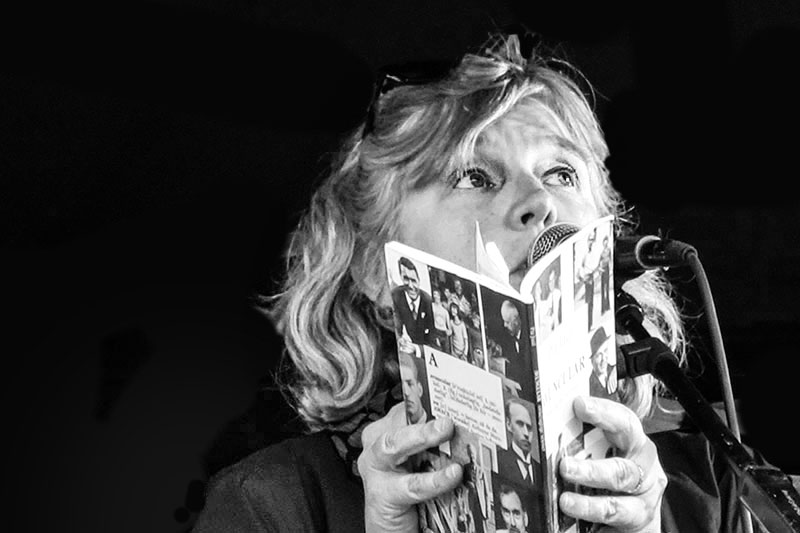
Pia Juul 2016.

Pia Juul (Danish: [ˈpiə ˈjuːl]; 30 May 1962 – 30 September 2020) was a Danish poet, prose writer, and translator. She received several prizes and was a member of the Danish Academy. She also taught at the writing school Forfatterskolen in Copenhagen.

== Biography ==
Juul was born in Korsør, Denmark, in 1962. Her parents were folk high school teachers Kurt Holger Juul and Inge Kærsgaard Hansen. She grew up in Skælskør before moving to the village Rørbæk in Himmerland at the age of six with her parents, her brother, and her younger sister. Juul graduated from Hobro Gymnasium in 1981 and enrolled in English studies at Aarhus University, but later dropped out. Her first collection of poems, levende og lukket, was published in 1985. Besides writing, she translated English, American, and Swedish literature for a living. She gave birth to a daughter in 1986. From 1989 to 1993, Juul was the co-editor of Danish literary magazine Den Blå Port. She later served as a board member for Danske Skønlitterære Forfattere (Danish Fiction Writers) from 1993 to 1995 and was part of the Danish Arts Foundation's literary committee from 1996. Juul was awarded the Beatrice Prize by the Danish Academy in 2000, and became a member of the Academy herself in 2005. She started working as a teacher at Forfatterskolen in the fall of 2005. In 2009, she received the Danske Banks Litteraturpris for her novel Mordet på Halland. Following the global surveillance disclosures in 2013, Juul joined over a thousand writers worldwide including Umberto Eco and T. C. Boyle in signing an appeal to create an international convention on digital rights to prevent governments and corporations from abusing technology for surveillance purposes. She died in 2020 at the age of 58.

== Bibliography ==
- levende og lukket, poems, 1985
- i brand måske, poems, 1987
- Forgjort, poems, 1989
- Skaden, novel, 1990
- En død mands nys, poems,1993
- sagde jeg, siger jeg, poems, 1999
- Mit forfærdelige ansigt, short stories, 2001
- Gespenst & andre spil, drama, 2002
- Opgang, short stories 2002
- Jeg vil hellere dø, short stories 2003
- Lidt ligesom mig, 2004
- Dengang med hunden, short stories, 2005
- Helt i skoven, poems, 2005
- På jagt, children's book, 2005
- Mordet på Halland, novel, 2009
- Radioteateret, poems, 2010
- Et liv med lys, biography, 2011
- Af sted, til hvile, short stories episodes, 2012
