= Janina Katz =

Polish-Danish writer (1939–2013)

Janina Katz (2 March 1939 – 18 October 2013) was a Polish-Danish writer. A Polish Jew, she emigrated to Denmark in 1969. In 1991, she published her first collection of poems Min mors datter (My Mother's Daughter).

== Biography ==
Katz was born into a Jewish family in Krakow in 1939. Most of her relatives died in concentration camps but she was smuggled out of a Polish workers camp to live with a Polish couple she called her "war parents" who brought her up as a Catholic. After the war, she lived with her mother who had survived imprisonment in various concentration camps.

After studying sociology and literature at Krakow University, Katz worked as a literary critic in the 1960s. In 1969, she emigrated to Denmark with her mother during the period of antisemitism after the Six-Day War in 1967 when the Soviet Union sided with the Arabs. For the next 13 years, she worked at the Royal Danish Library as a translator from Polish. She was 52 when she published Min moders datter (1991), her first poetry collection. Written in Danish, the work expressed her guilt at being one of her family's few survivors as well as the difficult relationship she had with her mother, abandoning her country and her mother tongue.

In 1993, she published her biographical novel Mit liv som barbar (My Life as a Barbarian), describing her life until her mother's death in 1987. It concludes with the words: "Life is a story. But only the luckiest of us are able to write it up." In 2006, she published another poetry collection Min spaltede tunge (My Split Tongue, 2006) and in 2009 the novel Længsel pa bestilling (Longing to Order), a romance about a Jewish girl from Denmark who meets Sammy on a trip to Israel. In 2008, she wrote another collection of poems, this time in Polish: Pisane po polsku. She translated it into Danish herself as Skrevet på polsk (Written in Polish). It contains reflections on her childhood in Poland during the holocaust, many of them sorrowfully negative: "Hvor lang er ikke denne liste/ af uindbudne gæster/ til mit ikke-bryllup?" (How long is then this list/ of uninvited guests/ to my non-wedding?)

All in all, her works combine sadness with humour. In particular, her short story collection Den glade jødinde og andre historier (The Merry Jewess and Other Stories, 1998) contrasts Jewish melancholy with surreal magic realism and the grotesque.

== Awards ==
In 1998, she received the Beatrice Award for her oeuvre from the Danish Academy.

== Works ==
Poetry

- 1991: Min moders datter
- 1992: Mit uvirkelige liv
- 1993: I mit drømmeland
- 1995: Scener fra det virkelige liv
- 1996: Uden for sæsonen
- 1998: Blandt andet
- 1999: Varme steder
- 2002: Det syvende barn
- 2004: Landskabet der blev væk
- 2006: Min spaltede tunge
- 2010: Tilbage til æblerne
- 2011: Skrevet på polsk
- 2013: Endnu ikke allerede

Novels

- 1993: Mit liv som barbar
- 1997: Putska
- 2001: Fortællinger til Abram
- 2005: Drengen fra dengang
- 2008: Længsel pa bestilling

For children

- 2001: Mit liv som syfiluter

== Bibliography ==
- Polish bibliography 1988 - 2001
