= Klaus Rifbjerg Debutant Prize =

Klaus Rifbjerg's Debutant Prize (Danish: Klaus Rifbjergs debutantpris for lyrik) was founded in 1983 by Danish author Klaus Rifbjerg, it is awarded every second year to a poet debutant, who has published his or her first collection with poems within the last two years. The poems must be written in one of the three main languages of the Danish Kingdom: Danish, Faroese or Greenlandic.

== Recipients of the Klaus Rifbjerg Debutant Prize ==
- 2024 Amina Elmi
- 2022 Lasse Raagaard Jønsson
- 2020 Molly Balsby
- 2018 Theresa Salomonsen
- 2016 Theis Ørntoft
- 2014 Asta Olivia Nordenhof
- 2012 Sissal Kampmann
- 2010 Eva Tind Kristensen
- 2008 Morten Søkilde
- 2006 Dy Plambeck
- 2004 Lars Skinnebach
- 2002 Martin Larsen
- 2000 Øverste Kirurgiske
- 1998 Mikkel Thykier
- 1996 Katrine Marie Guldager
- 1994 Kirsten Hammann
- 1992 Lene Henningsen
- 1990 Karen Marie Edelfeldt
- 1988 Lars Bukdahl
- 1986 Morti Vizki
- 1984 Juliane Preisler
