= Svanholm =

State in Copenhagen, Denmark

Coordinates: 55°47′1.15″N 11°56′21.28″E

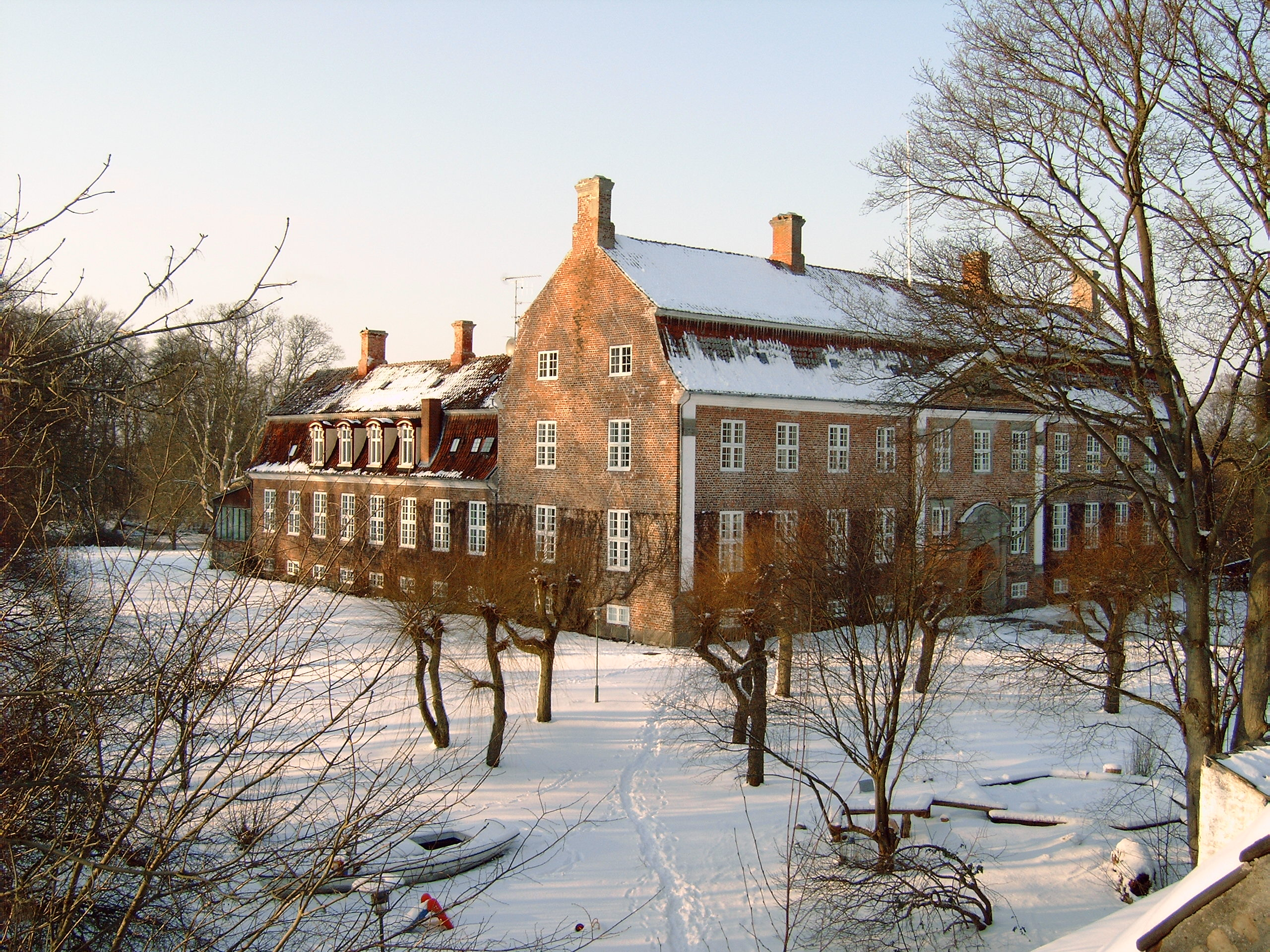
Svanholm

Svanholm is a country estate and former manor 55 kilometres (34 mi) west of Copenhagen, Denmark. In 1978 an association of over 100 persons bought the estate to create Denmark's largest intentional community. The Svanholm collective grows its own food and was one of the pioneers of organic farming in Denmark. As of January 2006, membership consisted of 70 adults and 35 children aged 0 to 80, jointly owning around 400 hectares (990 acres) of farmland, park, and woodlands.

The name comes from svan meaning "swan" and holm meaning "islet"; ie. Svanholm means "Swan-isle".

== Geography ==
The Svanholm estate is place within the north regions of the village of Skibby in Krogstrup parish, on the Hornsherred peninsula between Roskilde Fjord and Ise Fjord on the north coast of Zealand. It consists of a main building (the former manor house) plus 12 other dwellings and utility buildings nearby or elsewhere on the grounds.

== History ==
The earliest mention of Svanholm in historical documents is in 1346. Its owner at the time was the knight Niels Knudsen Manderup. The building was completely renovated and extended in 1744.

== Open to visitors ==
The community offers guided tours throughout the year on Sundays from 11 a.m. or upon request

== See also ==
- Twin Oaks Community, Virginia
