= De Danske Husmoderforeninger =

Danish housewives association

De Danske Husmoderforeninger or DDH (The Danish Housewives Associations), later Aktive Kvinder i Danmark (Active Women in Denmark), was established on 15 May 1920 as the central organization covering the many local housewives associations in Denmark. The first of these was Københavns Husmoderforening (Copenhagen's Housewives Association) which was established in 1917. The author Thit Jensen was responsible for founding the Copenhagen association as we all the DDH.

Over the years, the DDH became the country's largest organization for housewives, reaching a membership of some 10,000 by 2005. It later became known as Aktive Kvinder i Danmark but was dissolved in 2009.

The organization set out to support, protect and promote the role of the home for practical, social and ethical purposes, recognizing above all the importance of housework carried out by women. The DDF and the associations it represented focused on mainly middle-class women in cities, in parallel to the rural women's household associations established for the farming community. Education, which became a major concern, led in 1934 to the establishment of Marthaforbundet (The Martha Federabtion) which offered a three-year theoretical and practical course in housekeeping for young women. The association was also instrumental in establishing a course in housekeeping at Aarhus University in 1945.

The initial emphasis on the role of women in the home evolved in the 1960s when women increasingly entered the labour market. This later brought about changes in the name of the association, first in 1997 to DDH Forening af Aktive Kvinder (DDH Association of Active Women) and in 2001 to Aktive Kvinder i Danemark (Active Women in Denmark), the focus shifting to the part women played in public health, nutrition and childcare and as well as their social and economic responsibility for consumer issues. But as membership seriously declined, the association was dissolved in 2009.
