= Aase Hansen (writer) =

Danish educator, translator, and writer

Aase Hansen (March 11, 1893 – February 9, 1981) was a Danish educator, translator, and writer. She was a recipient of the Tagea Brandt Rejselegat and the Drachmannlegatet awards.

== Biography ==
The daughter of Frederik Carl Hansen, a merchant, and Mette Kirstine Pedersen, she was born in Frederiksværk. She was educated at Frederiksborg state school and then earned a degree in Danish, French and English from the University of Copenhagen in 1921. She taught high school for several years and also worked at the National Registry Office in Copenhagen. Hansen published two books Ebba Berings Studentertid ("The Academic Career of Ebba Berings") (1929) and Et Par Huse om en Station ("A Few Houses by a Station") (1930) before resigning from teaching in 1932 to write full time.

Her main characters are intelligent women who are conflicted between realizing their full potential and finding meaningful relationships. They are both liberated and imprisoned.

She was awarded the Tagea Brandt Rejselegat (Travel Scholarship) in 1948. In 1957, she received the Drachmannlegatet.

Hansen died in Copenhagen at the age of 87.

== Selected works ==
- Vraggods ("Wreckage") (1933)
- Stine (1933)
- En Kvinde kommer hjem ("A Woman returns home"), novel (1937)
- Drømmen om i Gaar ("The Dream of Yesterday"), novel (1939)
- Den lyse Maj ("Light May"), novel (1948)
- Skygger i et Spejl ("Shadows in a Mirror"), novel (1951)
- Klip af et Billedark ("Clippings from a Picture Sheet"), memoir (1973)
- Forvitringens Aar ("In years of decline") (1977)
