= Valdemar Rørdam =

Danish post and author

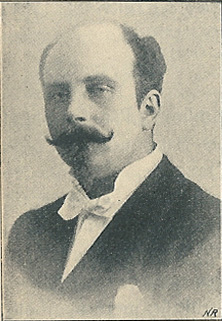
- Born: 23 September 1872
- Died: 13 July 1946 (aged 73)
- Awards: Holberg Medal (1937)

Valdemar Rørdam (23 September 1872 – 13 July 1946) was a Danish national conservative poet and author. His most famous poem "Denmark in a thousand years" was a contender for becoming the Danish national hymn.

== Career ==
In the 1920s and 1930s, he was a major poet of national conservative bent, and the Danish national community was his favorite theme. In 1937 he received the Holberg Medal, and in 1937 and 1938 he was nominated for the Nobel Prize in Literature. As many other right wing intellectuals he was a strong opponent of Soviet communism. His son Helgo Rørdam had emigrated to Finland, where he participated as a volunteer in the Winter War, and was killed in battle against the Soviets.

In 1941 Rørdam published the poem "Then came the day that we have long awaited", in which he praised Adolf Hitler's efforts to eradicate bolshevism. Having tried in vain to have the poem published in the newspaper Politiken, he published it in the Nazi student magazine "Akademisk Aktion". The poem was not well received in German occupied Denmark, and Rørdam became a pariah. The fact that he later wrote a tribute to Christian Frederik von Schalburg, the leader of the Danish Free Corps Denmark who fell on the eastern front in German service, did not ameliorate matters. Rørdam retired to western Zealand, where he stayed for several years with his friend and lover Sigurd Swane until his death in 1946.

== Bibliography ==
- Sol og Sky (1895)
- Tre strænge (1897)
- Luft og land (1910)
- Fugleviser (1924)
- Tale fra Skafottet (1945)
