= Klokkeren fra Notre Dame (musical) =

Klokkeren fra Notre Dame (The Hunchback of Notre Dame) is a Danish musical written and composed by Knud Christensen, commonly known as Sebastian, in 2002. Based on Victor Hugo's 1831 novel of the same name, it was written for the Mastodonterne theatre company, where it was premiered in March 2002. It was highly successful and was later performed at the Folketeatret and on tour in Denmark.
