= Astrid Saalbach =

Danish writer and playwright (born 1955)

Astrid Saalbach (born 29 November 1955) is a Danish playwright and novelist.

== Biography ==
She was born in Søborg and trained in acting at the Danish National Theatre School. She worked as an actor for seven years before turning to writing. In 1981, she wrote the radio play Spor i sandet (Footprints in the sand). That was followed by the radio play Bekræftelsen (The Confirmation) in 1982 and the television play En verden, der blegner (A World that Fades Away) in 1984. In 1985, she published a book of short stories, Månens ansigt (The face of the moon).

Later plays include:

- Dansetimen (The Dance Lesson) (1986)
- Den usynlige by (The Invisible City) (1986)
- Myung (1989) for television
- Miraklernes tid (Time of the Miracles) (1990)
- the trilogy Morgen og aften (Morning and Evening) (1993), Det velsignede barn (The Blessed Child) (1996) and Aske til aske, støv til støv (Ashes to ashes, Dust to dust) (1998)
- Det kolde hjerte (The Cold Heart) (2002), received the Wilhelm Hansen Foundation Award for Best Drama
- Verdens ende (The end of the world) (2003), received the Nordic Dramatist award in 2004 and the Reumert Award for Best Dramatist

In 1999, she published her first novel Den hun er (Who She Is).

Saalbach married Jens Kaas.

== Awards and honours ==
She received the Nordic Radio Play Award in 1983 and the lifetime state grant in 1997. She has also received the Kjeld Abell Prize and the Holberg Medal.
