= Christina Hesselholdt =

Danish writer

Christina Hesselholdt (born 19 December 1962) is a Danish author. She is a cand.phil. in literary studies and also graduated from the Forfatterskolen in Copenhagen in 1990, where she has also taught ever since. She has been co-editor of the literary magazines Banana Split and Den Blå Port.

Christina Hesselholdt has received a number of awards for her work and in 2018 received the Danish Academy's Grand Prize, which is described as the country's most prestigious recognition of an authorship.

== Bibliography ==
=== Books for adults ===
- Køkkenet, gravkammeret & landskabet, Rosinante 1991 (novel)
- Det skjulte, Rosinante 1993 (novel)
- Eks, Munksgaard / Rosinante 1995 (novel)
- Udsigten, Munksgaard / Rosinante 1995 (novel)
- Hovedstolen, Munksgaard / Rosinante 1998 (novel)
- Kraniekassen, Rosinante 2001
- Du, mit du, Rosinante 2003 (novel)
- En have uden ende, Rosinante 2005 (prosatekster)
- I familiens skød, Rosinante 2007 (novel)
- Camilla and the horse, Rosinante 2008 (short story)
- Camilla – og resten af selskabet : en fortællerkreds, Rosinante 2010 (short story)
- Selskabet gør op, Rosinante 2012 (short story)
- Agterudsejlet, Rosinante 2014 (short story)
- Lykkelige familier, Rosinante 2014 (novel)
- Vivian, Rosinante 2016 (novel)

=== Bøger for børn ===
- Prinsessen på sandslottet, Høst 1998
- Brandmanden fra før, Høst 1999
- Hjørnet der gik sin vej, Rosinante 2000
- Prinsessen i sommerhuset, Høst 2001
- Onde onkel snegleæder, Høst 2003
- Prinsesse og de halve slotte, Høst 2006
- Den grådige skarv, Høst 2007
- Det gale kattehus, Høst 2007
- Værelse uden nøgle, Dansklærerforeningen 2008
- Prinsessen på sandslottet og andre historier, Høst 2008
- Hr. Andrés vanvidsnat, Høst 2009
- Grotten, Dansklærerforeningen 2010

=== Texts in other languages ===
- Die Fiktionen einer Kindheit i Muschelhaufen. Jahresschrift für Literatur und Grafik. Nr. 39/40-2000
