= Peter Laugesen =

Danish poet and translator (born 1942)

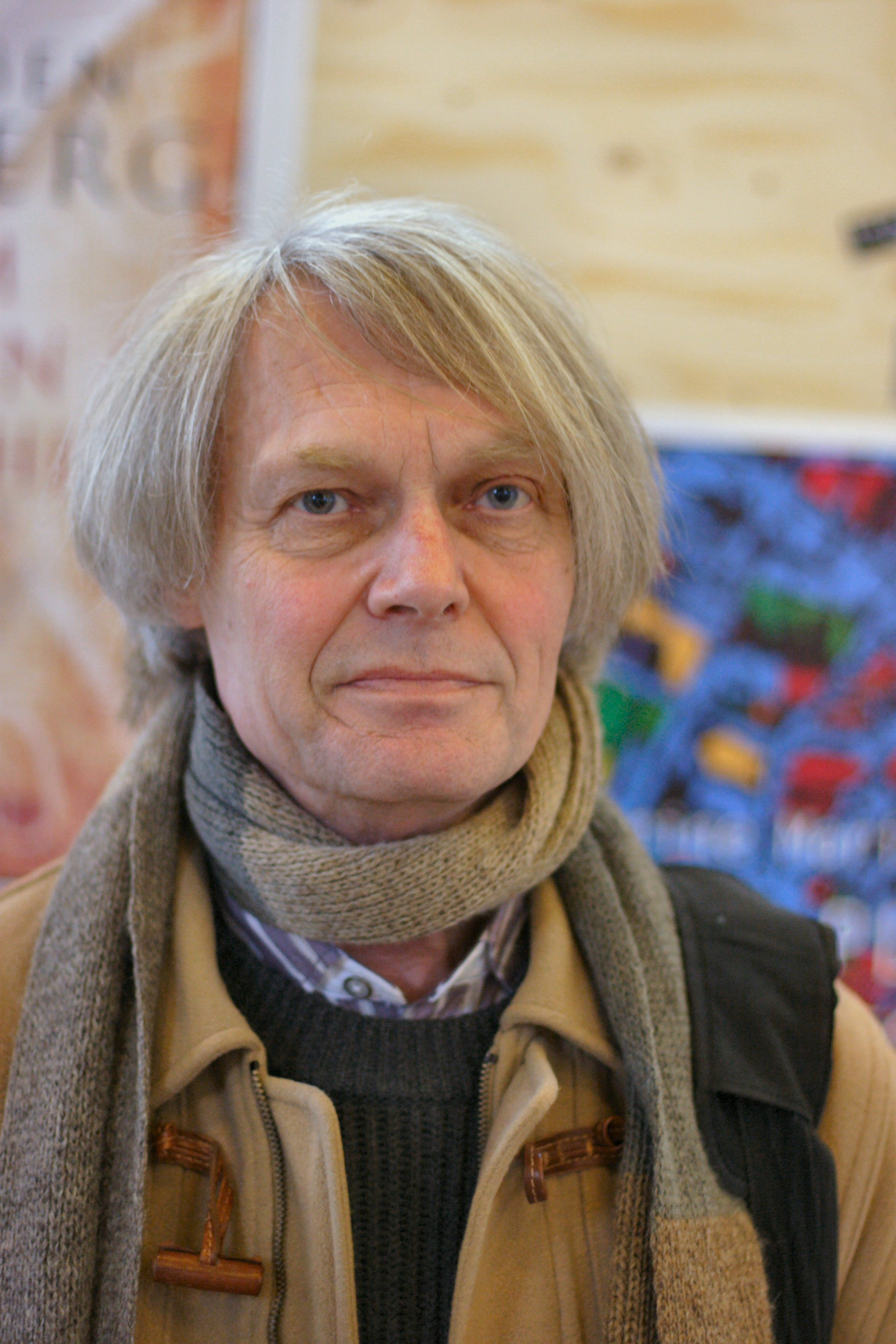
- Born: March 5, 1942 (age 84); Copenhagen
- Education: typographer
- Known for: Poetry, playwright, translation

Peter Laugesen (born 5 March 1942 in Copenhagen) is a Danish poet and playwright and was member of the Situationist International.

== Biography ==
Peter Laugesen lives in Aarhus and he graduated from Aarhus Cathedral School in 1961 and trained as a typographer.

He became a member of the Situationist International in 1962. He was attracted by the writing of Ivan Chtcheglov and contacted Jeppesen Victor Martin and participated in a Situationist exhibition in Denmark. He was then invited to France where he met Guy Debord and Michèle Bernstein and was attracted to the dérive as a poetic practice. He was also influenced by Alexander Trocchi and his book Cain's Book. He was expelled in 1963. because he refused to give up poetic practice. It was only later that he met Jørgen Nash with whom he became good friends. He published his first collection of poems, Landscape, in 1967.

In 1992, Peter Laugesen received the Grand Prize of the Danish Academy. In 2003 he was awarded the Danish Critics Prize for Literature (Kritikerprisen). Since 1997 he has been a member of the Danish Academy.

Laugesen has performed and released CDs with Mind Spray, Sing Vogel and Christian Vuust. He also contributes media and social commentary, in particular for Dagbladet Information.

For many years Peter Laugesen collaborated with the author Dan Turèll who at one time lived next door. They subsequently continued their intense dialogue by letter, and also produced joint publications. In 1969, they participated both at Hindsgavl seminar in 1969 with Kristen Bjorn Kjaer, who also took part in joint publishing projects Bardo. Some of the texts from Hindsgavl seminar is preserved in a small folder. In addition, the two double-bonded by the Font that is an art book, rather than a collection of texts.

Peter Laugesen has a humble, anarchistic approach to writing practice, with deep roots in Beat poetry, inspired by writers like Allen Ginsberg, Jack Kerouac and William Burroughs: the beautiful and the ugly cannot be separated but are interdependent.

Peter Laugesen has applied his language skills to translation e.g. Tender Buttons by Gertrude Stein. He found this harder than translating James Joyce's Finnegans Wake which he has been working on for over twenty years. He has also translated Emil Nolde and Arthur Köpcke.

In 1999 he translated Novalis' Hymns to the night which Henry Sartou dramatized for Miss Anne Theatre. Peter Laugesen has been a member of the committee which nominates Danish writers for the annual Nordic Council Literature Prize for several years. He was co-editor of the journal Tumor. He sits in the Odin Theatre's board of directors.

== Poetry ==
Quote from a commemorative poem from Pjaltetider, Borgen (1997):

Words that came creeping up around the wall
as tropical insects, full of new meaning
and yet are not significantly different from,
what Simon and Sperling wrote about football and dreams.
It was the same, just the same, always the same
and it is still the same.
Poetry so should be as specific as it is far ...

- Dobbeltskrift (English: Double Writing), 1973 - with Dan Turèll
- Digte m. m. (English: Poems and more), 1973 - with Dan Turèll, Jens Smærup Sørensen, & Henning Mortensen
