= Villy Sørensen =

Danish author and philosopher

- Born: 13 January 1929; Frederiksberg
- Died: 16 September 2001 (aged 72); Copenhagen
- Occupation: Author, philosopher, essayist
- Period: 1953–2001
- Literary movement: Modernism

Villy Sørensen (13 January 1929 – 11 September 2001) was a Danish short story writer, philosopher and literary critic of the Modernist tradition. His fiction was heavily influenced by his philosophical ideas, and he has been compared to Franz Kafka in this regard.

== History ==
Born in Copenhagen, Sørensen graduated from the Vestre Borgerdydskole in 1947, and then attended the University of Copenhagen and the University of Freiburg studying philosophy. Although he did not graduate, he later received an honorary degree from the University of Copenhagen.

Sørensen published his first collection of short stories, Strange Stories in 1953, which many critics have identified as being the start of Danish literary Modernism. He published additional collections of short stories in 1955 and 1964, all winning various awards in Denmark. These stories generally explored the absurd and hidden parts of the human psyche.

Sørensen began editing the journal Vindrosen (with Klaus Rifbjerg) in 1959. Afterward, he became a member of the Danish Academy in 1965, subsequently editing several other Modernist journals and periodicals. Sørensen, though he continued to produce short fiction throughout his life, was also deeply engaged in philosophy, about which he wrote many essays and several books including Seneca: The Humanist at the Court of Nero and his response to Søren Kierkegaard's Either/Or, Hverken-eller (i.e. "Neither/Nor"). He also published books and essays about Nietzsche, Kafka, Marx, Schopenhauer and Kierkegaard, and was a notable translator of over 20 books. He was awarded the Grand Prize of the Danish Academy in 1962, The Nordic Council's Literature Prize in 1974, the Hans Christian Andersen Award in 1983, the inaugural Swedish Academy Nordic Prize in 1986, along with many other awards and recognitions. He died in Copenhagen in 2001.

== Bibliography ==
- Sære historier, 1953 - Strange Stories / Tiger in the Kitchen and Other Strange Stories
- Ufarlige historier, 1955 - Harmless Tales
- Tiger in the Kitchen and Other Strange Stories, 1957
- Digtere og dæmoner: Fortolkninger og vurderinger, 1959
- ed.: Begrebet Angest by Søren Kierkegaard, 1960
- Hverken-eller: Kritiske betragtningen, 1961
- ed.: Økonomi og filosofi by Karl Marx, 1962
- Nietzsche, 1963
- Formynderfortællinger, 1964 - Tutelary Tales
- ed.: Haabløse Slægter by Herman Bang, 1965
- ed.: Eventyr og historier by H.C. Andersen, 1965
- ed.: Skuespil by William Shakespeare, 1966
- Kafkas digtning, 1968
- Schopenhauer, 1969
- Mellem fortid og fremtid, 1969
- Midler uden mål. 1971
- Uden mål - og med, moralske tanker, 1973
- Seneca, 1976 - Seneca: The Humanist at the Court of Nero
- translator: The Book by Martin A. Hansen, 1978 (with Anne Born)
- Oprør fra midten, 1978 (with Niels I Meyer and K. Helweg-Pedersen) - Revolt from the Center
- Den gyldne middelvej, og andre debatindlæg i 1970erne, 1979
- Vejrdage, betragtninger 1980
- translator: The Dream of the Woman by Knud Hjortø, 1980 (with Anne Born)
- Alladin, 1981 (with Errol le Cain)
- Ragnarok, en gudefortælling, 1982 - The Downfall of the Gods - Ragnarök, jumalten tuho
- Røret om oprøret, 1982 (with Niels I Meyer and K. Helweg-Pedersen)
- translator: The Mountains by H.C. Branner (with Anne Born)
- ed.: Kunsten og revolutionen by Richard Wagner, 1983
- En gudedrøm, ballet for Nyt Danske Danseteater, 1984
- translation: Skøn er krigen for den uerfarne (Dulce bellum inexpertis) by Erasmus Roterodamus, 1984
- De mange og De enkelte og andre småhistorier, 1986
- ed.: Tine by Herman Bang, 1986
- ed.: Tunge Melodier by Herman Bang, 1987
- ed.: Enten-Eller by Søren Kierkegaard, 1988
- Demokratiet og kunsten, 1988
- Tilløb: dagbog 1949-53, 1988
- Den berømte Odysseus, 1988 (with Andy Li Jørgensen)
- Apollons oprør: de udødeliges historie, 1989
- Another Metamorphosis & Other Fictions, 1990, translated by Tiina Nunnally & Steven T. Murray
- Forløb: dagbog 1953-61, 1990
- ed.: Demokratiske visioner by Walt Whitman, 1991
- Den frie vilje, 1992
- Jesus og Kristus, 1992
- Perioder: dagbog 1961-74, 1993
- Historien om Ødipus, 1995 (with Roald Als)
- translation: Grimms eventyr, 1995
- Blot en drengestreg, 1996 (with Pernille Kløvedal Helweg)
- translation: Drømme by Franz Kafka, 1998
- Jesus og Kristus, 1999
- På egne veje, 2000
- En ensom fugl, 2000

== Sources ==
- Petri Liukkonen. "Villy Sørensen". Books and Writers.
- "Sorensen, Villy." Encyclopædia Britannica Online. Retrieved 31 October 2006.
