= Leif Panduro =

Danish writer, novelist, short story writer and dramatist

Leif Thormod Panduro (18 April 1923 – 16 January 1977) was a Danish writer, novelist, short story writer, and dramatist.

== Life ==
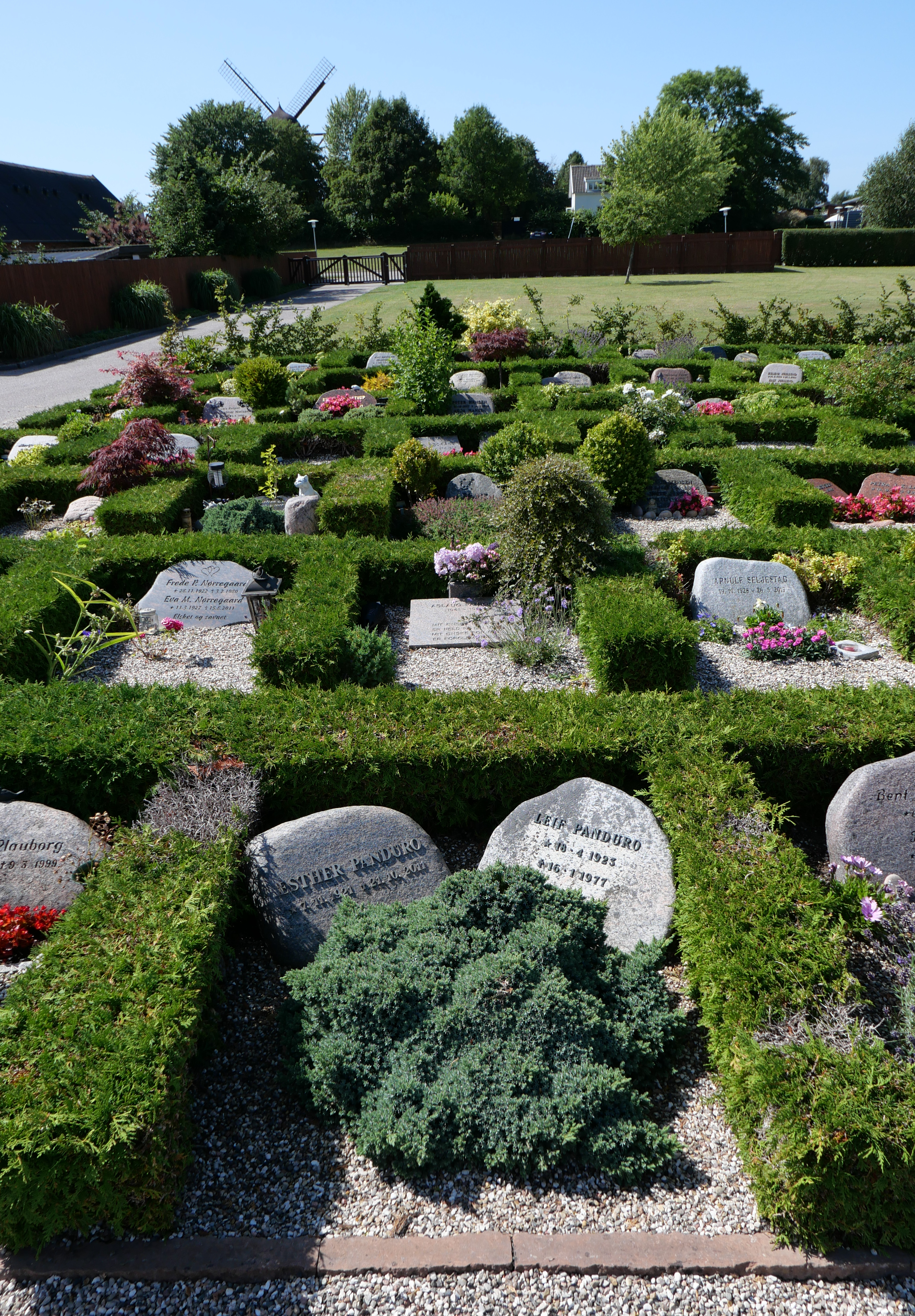
The grave of Panduro and his wife Esther, née Larsen (1921-2011), at the cemetery of Melby.

A dentist by profession, he began in his thirties to write stories about people who can't conform to society's rules for one reason or another. Rend mig i traditionerne, (Kick me in the traditions, meaning: screw the traditions) from 1959 is about an adolescent who finally ends up in an asylum because he thinks society is mad. This novel was made into a film in 1979. Fern fra Danmark (Mr. Fern from Denmark) is about a man who wakes up in a hospital with amnesia but discovers more and more about a not very pleasant self.

Panduro's books and plays grew increasingly pessimistic about the orderly middle-class society and its senseless norms.

Panduro's books were and are still popular in Denmark. In 1970 he won the Danish booksellers prize De Gyldne Laurbær. Several of his novels were later made into films. His books are used in the Danish public schools.

== Awards ==
In 1971 he was awarded with the Grand Prize of the Danish Academy and five years later he became a member of the Danish Academy

== Bibliography ==
- Vi har kun et liv (1956) (published in Politiken's Magasinet 11 February 1956)
- Av, min guldtand (1957)
- Rend mig i traditionerne (1958) novel – as film in 1979
- De uanstændige (1960) – as film in 1983 with the title De uanstændige
- Øgledage (1961)
- Gris på gaflen. Studenterforeningens nytårskomedie 1962 (1962)
- Uro i forstæderne. Short Story. (Published in Aktuelt 28 January 1962)
- Fern fra Danmark (1963)
- Fejltagelsen: den korte og ufuldstændige beretning om tilfældet Marius Berg (1964)
- Fern, short story, published in Det bedste de skrev (1965)
- Den gale mand (1965)
- Lollipop og andre spil (1966)
- Tur i natten, short story in Den danske novelle/65 (1966)
- Uro i forstæderne, short story in Sengeheste: en erotisk antologi (1966)
- Vejen til Jylland (1966)
- Jul i landsbyen – en svinehøring (1967)
- Nej, ikke mer!, short story in Sengeheste: en erotisk antologi (1967)
- Ka' De li' østers? (1967)
- Hvor er min kone?, short story in Ny dansk novellekunst: en antologi udsendt i Danmarks Radio (1968)
- Farvel Thomas og andre tv-spil (1968)
- Hvor er mit hoved?, short story in Dansk radiodramatik 2: et udvalg fra Radioteatrets repertoire : 1957–67 (1968)
- Fortsættelses-sagaen eller Jul i den blandede landhandel (1968)
- Er De kørt træt – er De for træt til at køre!: en redegørelse for problemet træthed og motorkørsel og en novelle af Leif Panduro (1969)
- Når man er 18", short story in "Muntre danske historier (1969)
- Daniels anden verden (1970)
- Bella og Et godt liv. To tv-spil (Two TV plays) (1971)
- Vinduerne (1971)
- Amatørerne (1972)
- Selma, William og Benny. Tre tv-spil (Three TV plays) (1972)
- De dyre ord, short story in Eftersommer og andre fortællinger for teen-agers (1973)
- Den store bandit (1973)
- Den ubetænksomme elsker (1973) – as a film in 1982: Den ubetænksomme elsker
- Den bedste af alle verdener (1974)
- I Adams verden og Farvel Thomas. To tv-spil (1974)
- Den bedste af alle verdener, short story in Kraftfelter : en antologi (1975)
- Bertram og Lisa og Anne og Paul. To tv-spil (Two TV plays) (1975)
- Kannibaler i kælderen, short story in Teatret i det 20. århundrede: teori og praksis (1975)
- Høfeber (1975) – Høfeber (film) (1991)
- Hvilken virkelighed? : kulturkritiske og selvbiografiske artikler (1977)
- Louises hus : et tv-spil (TV play) (1977)
- En by i provinsen (TV-serie in 17 episodes)
- Rundt om Selma (1971)
- Regalierne, short story in: Tema og tekster i dansk nutidslitteratur (1982)
- Brev fra Leif, short story in I ramme spøg : et udvalg af Lise Nørgaards yndlingshumor (1986)
- Den ufuldendte dommer (1986)
- Bare det hele var anderledes : short stories from 1950s (1987)
- Leif Panduro (1988)
- Et ordentligt kaos : tekster (1994)
- Uro i forstæderne – og andre noveller – short stories (1995)

== Awards and honors ==
- 1963 – Danish Critics Prize for Literature (Kritikerprisen)
- 1966 – Herman Bangs Mindelegat
- 1970 – De Gyldne Laurbær
- 1971 – Grand Prize of the Danish Academy
- 1976 – Member of the Danish Academy
