= Jacob Paludan =

Danish author (1896–1975)

- Born: Stig Henning Jacob Puggaard Paludan; 7 February 1896; Frederiksberg, Denmark
- Died: 26 September 1975 (aged 79); Copenhagen, Denmark
- Resting place: Søholm Kirkegård, Birkerød
- Occupation: Author
- Writing career
- Language: Danish
- Period: 1922–1975
- Notable work: Fugle omkring Fyret
- Notable awards: Grand Prize of the Danish Academy, 1964; De Gyldne Laurbær, 1951

Stig Henning Jacob Puggaard Paludan (7 February 1896 in Copenhagen – 26 September 1975) was a Danish author. He is regarded as one of the biggest Danish authors of the 20th century. His debut was De vestlige veje from 1922. From 1933 onwards he worked full time as an author.

He was the grandson of Danish geologist Christopher Puggaard.

== Selected works ==
- De Vestlige Veje 1922
- Søgelys 1923
- Urolige sange 1923
- En Vinter lang 1924
- Fugle omkring Fyret 1925
- Feodor Jansens jeremiader 1927
- Markerne Modnes 1927
- Landet forude: et spil om Utopie 1928
- Året rundt: trykt og utrykt 1929
- Jørgen Stein 1932/33
