= Jørn Lund (linguist) =

Danish linguist (born 1946)

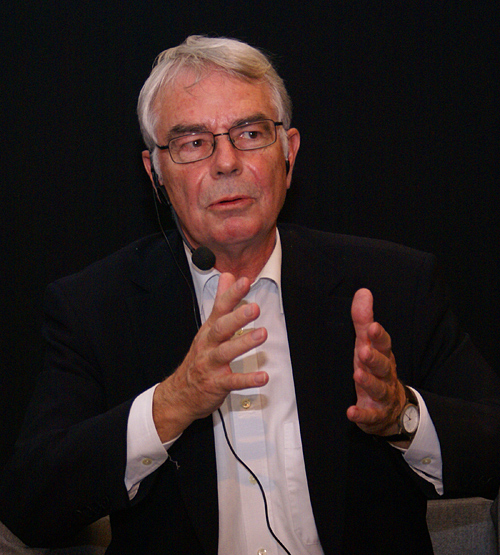
Jørn Lund in 2008

Jørn Lund (born 30 January 1946) is a Danish linguist who is professor of Danish language at Danmarks Lærerhøjskole, and since 2013 chairman of Dansk Sprognævn (the Danish council for regulation of the Danish language). He is the author of the Great Dictionary of Danish Pronunciation (1990, with Lars Brink) and the two-volume Standard Danish (Dansk rigsmål) (1975, also with Lars Brink), as well as a number of popular books about the Danish language. He was also the chairman of several government councils for language and cultural politics, notably the council that produced the Danish Culture Canon in 2007. Since 1980 he is a member of the Danish Academy. from 1991 to 2001 he was the Editor in Chief of Den Store Danske Encyklopædi (The Great Danish Encyclopedia). He is a fellow of the Norwegian Academy of Science and Letters. He writes a weekly column in the Danish newspaper Politiken.
