= F. P. Jac =

Danish poet

F. P. Jac (11 November 1955 – 25 December 2008), born Flemming Palle Jacobsen, was a Danish poet.

His first publication was the poetry collection Spontane kalender-blade (Spontaneous Calendar-sheets) from 1976. Even if his production is much "lighter" in tone than his peers of that day, he is counted as belonging to the so-called eighties-generation of poets. He published more than fifty collections of poetry, a few of them in cooperation with some other Danish poets, namely Asger Schnack and Klaus Høeck. His latest work while alive was Søvnlysninger, (Sleeplightings), 2007.

Jac often utilised autobiographical material in his writing, twisting everything to an innovative, kind-hearted, humorous and distinct voice. Approaching everyday life with an ability to find beauty and oddness he coined new words describing feelings and situations previously unaccounted for in Danish. This gave him a reputation for being an eccentric with a slanted and personal use of language, but also brought him acclaim among peers and a fan base. In 2008, 1 month before his death, he was thus awarded the 'grand prize of the Academy for the Arts' for his life achievement in regards to kindling the Danish language.
