= Svend Åge Madsen =

Danish novelist

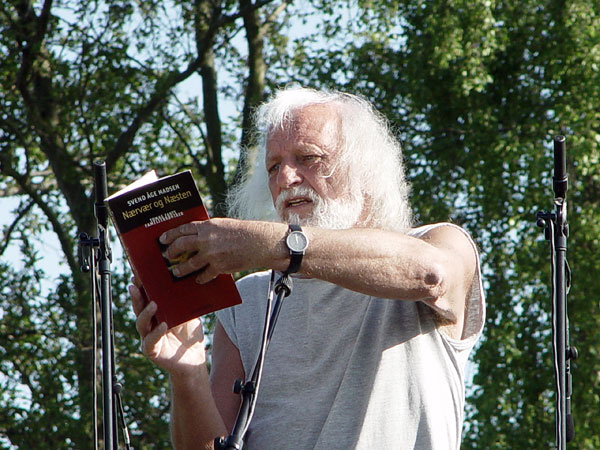
Svend Åge Madsen (Aarhus 2010)

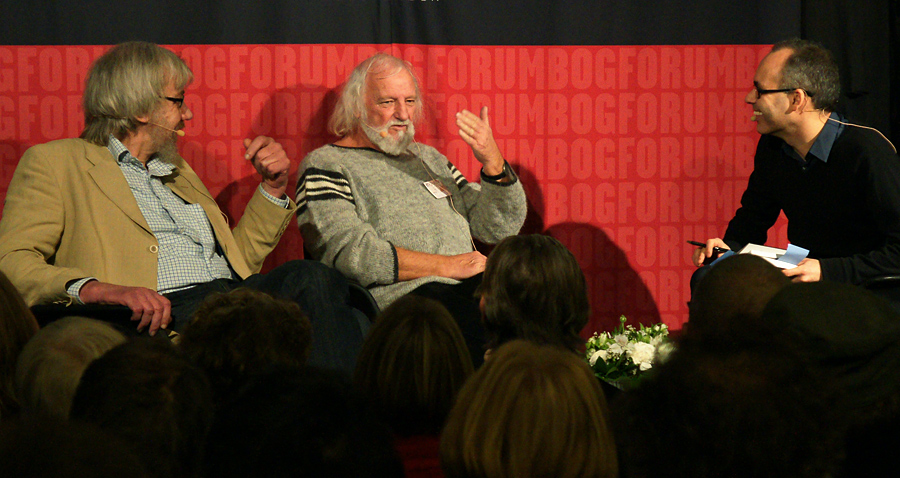
Svend Aage Madsen

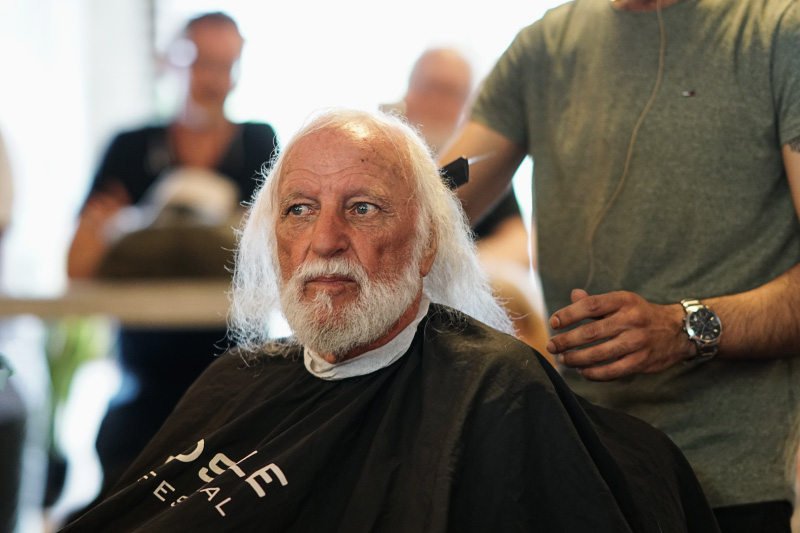
Svend Åge Madsen at LiteratureXchange Festival (Aarhus, Denmark 2019)

Svend Åge Madsen (Danish pronunciation: [ˈsvenˀ ˈɔːwə ˈmæsn̩] born 2 November 1939) is a Danish novelist and dramatist. He studied mathematics before he began writing fiction. His novels are generally philosophical and humorous. Several of his works have been made into films in Denmark. His writings are extensive and has been translated into many languages.

Madsen's writing style and philosophy have placed him amongst the most distinguished and widely read authors in Denmark today. His novels reflect the grave problems faced by modern civilisation, and a number of them have achieved cult status in Denmark. The interplay between quasi-realism and complete fantasy in Svend Åge Madsen's novels leads to contemplation of the indefinable nature of human existence.

== Work ==
Madsen's work may be divided into three phases. The first phase comprises abstract modernist works influenced by writers such as Franz Kafka, Samuel Beckett, Alain Robbe-Grillet and James Joyce. These works examine the capacity of language to depict reality; they include the experimental novels The Visit (Besøget, 1963) and Additions (Tilføjelser, 1967), the "unnovel" Pictures of Lust (Lystbilleder, 1964), and the collection of short stories Eight Times Orphan (Otte gange orphan, 1965).

Madsen would later define these novels as "anti-art". The change to the next phase of his work was, according to him, a shift from "anti-art" to "anti-anti-art", which accepted the result of the first phase: "that reality can not be described", but that one may attempt to build a meaningful literature from a relativistic stance. The project was now to show how "lower" genres (such as crime fiction, romantic fiction and science fiction) could be a mosaic of equal truths that make up reality. This change is also a change from modernist literature to postmodern literature.

The third phase of Madsen's work comprises some novels that are less abstract and more realistic than his earlier works, but are still highly imaginative. At the same time, Madsen started working on a "macro"-text in which characters are used repeatedly in different novels, main characters becoming minor characters and vice versa. All of these novels take places in the city of Aarhus in Denmark. Through a complex net of bizarre stories, Madsen creates an alternative Aarhus in which everything is possible and extreme philosophical positions are explored. Madsen's late literature is quite unique but can perhaps best be likened to the magical realism of Latin America.

A recurring trait in his books is that the characters face some sort of extreme situation which enables a philosophical theme to emerge.

Perhaps Madsen's most famous work is Vice and Virtue in the Middle Time (Tugt og utugt i mellemtiden, 1976) which has been translated into English. In this novel, a man from a very distant future takes on the experiment of writing a novel of the age called Middle Time, which is the western world in the 1970s. This creates an amusing philosophical position, in which everything we take for granted is questioned in the light of a totally different perspective on life. The main plot is a rewriting of Alexandre Dumas, père's The Count of Monte Cristo, but there are references to many classic novels.

== Bibliography ==
Madsen's books, and some of his plays, have been translated in to a wide array of languages, from Czech and Greek to Latvian, French and Japanese. This includes English as well, however, most of them have not been translated.

The following books may be considered to be Madsen's most important:

- The Windrose, (Vindrosen) 1962 [Short story]
- The Visit (Besøget), 1963
- Pictures of Lust (Lystbilleder), 1964
- Eight Times Orphan (Otte gange Orphan), 1965.
- Additions (Tilføjelser), 1967
- The Corpse and the Lust (Liget og lysten), 1968
- The Third Time, We'll Take Him (Tredje gang så ta'r vi ham...), 1969
- The Masked Ball (Maskeballet), 1970. Translated to English in 1978.
- What If the World Exists (Sæt verden er til), 1971
- Days With Diam or Life at Night (Dage med Diam eller Livet om natten), 1972. Translated to English 1994.
- Virtue and Vice in the Middle Time (Tugt og utugt i mellemtiden), 1976. Translated to English in 1992.
- The Bond of Hatred (Hadets bånd), 1978
- See the Light of Day (Se dagens lys), 1980
- Off the Track You Have Come (Af sporet er du kommet), 1984
- Let Time Pass (Lad tiden gå), 1986
- The Laveran Family (Slægten Laveran), 1988
- Narrating the People (At fortælle menneskene), 1989
- Between Heaven and Earth (Mellem himmel og jord), 1990
- The Hunt for a Human (Jagten på et menneske), 1991
- Seven Ages of Madness (Syv aldres galskab), 1994
- The Female Without a Body (Kvinden uden krop), 1996
- Takes Place (Finder sted), 1998
- Mirror of Genes / Remirrored (ambiguous title) (Genspejlet), 1999
- The Ungodly Farce (Den ugudelige farce), 2002
- The Seventh Tape (Det syvende bånd), 2006
- The Man Who Discovered That He Did Not Exist (Manden der opdagede at han ikke eksisterede), 2007
- Many Strange Things Going On (Mange sære ting for), 2009
- The Girl In The Concrete Mixer (Pigen i cementblanderen), 2013

The following writings have also been translated to English:

- The Blind Pavillon (Den blinde pavillon), 2003. A collection of short stories.

Apart from those noted above, several of Madsen's short stories have been translated to English - some of them several times and in collaboration with Madsen himself - and appears in a variety of collections.
