= Jørgen Sonne (writer) =

Danish lyricist and writer (1925–2015)

Jørgen Jacobsen Sonne (15 October 1925 – 9 September 2015) was a Danish lyricist and writer. He was born in Copenhagen.
