= Kjeld Abell =

Danish playwright, screenwriter, and theatrical designer

- Born: 25 August 1901; Ribe, Denmark
- Died: 5 March 1961 (aged 59); Copenhagen, Denmark
- Resting place: Assistens Cemetery, Copenhagen
- Occupations: dramatist, stage designer
- Writing career
- Notable works: Melodien der blev vœk (1935) (The Melody that got Lost), Anna Sophie Hedvig (1939)

Kjeld Abell (25 August 1901 – 5 March 1961) was a Danish playwright, screenwriter, and theatrical designer. Born in Ribe, Denmark, Abell's first designs were seen in ballets directed by George Balanchine at Copenhagen's Royal Danish Theatre and London's Alhambra Theatre.

Roughly the dramatic work of Abell might be divided into three phases: a) criticism of middle class conventions, b) fighting Nazism and c) criticism of post-war pessimism and urge for death. Perhaps he is the first consequent modernist among Danish playwrights with his use of a flash back Chinese box system and a growing use of symbols and parallel actions.

== Biography ==
Abell worked as a stagehand and a costume designer in Paris before he got his big break as a playwright in 1935 with Melodien, der blev vœk 1935, (English translation The Melody That Got Lost, 1939), which is a playful comedy about spiritual disorientation in a technological society; it is also expressionistic in that it utilizes non-verbal and unrealistic elements, undoubtedly inspired by ballet. The first production of this play was in 1935 in Copenhagen followed by a production a year later in London by the Arts Theatre. In this play Abell describes the life of the "white-collar worker" limited by old-fashioned conventions, and it is a fantasy about the mental emancipation of "the little man". A young, disrespectful attitude together with both lyric and imaginative dialogue has let it remain his most popular work. Some of its song lines have become classics.

Both before and during the Nazi occupation of Denmark, Abell used his plays to protest the loss of freedom. Themes in these plays explore freedom and escapism as self-annihilation. These works include Anna Sophie Hedvig (1939, English translation 1944), a defence of violence as a necessary means against tyranny and a criticism of passive humanism, beyond any doubt inspired by the Spanish Civil War, and Dronning gaar igen (The Queen on Tour, 1943). Abell spent much of his time during the occupation in hiding due to his anti-Nazi activism. Silkeborg (1946) expresses criticism of both Danish passivity and acceptance of the German occupation.

Following the war many of his plays took on complex mystical elements. These plays include Dage paa en sky (Days on a Cloud, 1947), Den blå pekingeser (The Blue Pekingese, 1954), Kameliadamen (The Lady of the Camellias, 1954 – a personal version of the drama by Dumas) and Skriget (The Scream, English translation 1961). The much debated Dage paa en Sky both takes place among the Olympic mythological goddesses and in the brain of a suicidal scientist, it warns against the atomic war, and accuses scientists of prostituting themselves to the rulers. The even more complex Den blå pekingeser also takes place in the head of a man, while his former love is threatened by death. Again the message is to break one's isolation and to accept life. Abell died in Copenhagen.

Hailed in his prime as a fresh and humorous reformer, critic and teaser of Danish theatre and later respected for his anti-fascist attitudes. After the war Abell was accused of being a fellow traveller and also criticised for being too complicated and strained. This together with his growing disappointments with the left wing partly led to isolation. However he is probably still regarded as the most important new-thinker of Danish drama of the inter-war period. In European dramatic literature he has been compared to French authors such as Giraudoux and Anouilh. He also was a songwriter of revues, and he wrote film scripts.

He became a member of the Danish Academy in 1960.

== Works ==
Name	Year	English Translation	Year of Eng. Tr.
Melodien der blev væk	1935	The Melody That Got Lost	1939
Eva aftjener sin Barnepligt	1936	Eva is Serving Her Child Duty	
Anna Sophie Hedvig	1939	Anna Sophie Hedvig	1944
Judith	1940	Judith	
Dage paa en Sky	1947	Days on a Cloud	
Den blå pekingeser	1954	The Blue Pekingese	
Kameliadamen	1959	The Lady of the Camellias	
Skriget	1961	The Scream	

== Sources ==
- Banham, Martin, ed. The Cambridge Guide to Theatre. Cambridge University Press, 1992.
- Hartnoll, Phyllis, ed. The Oxford Companion to the Theatre. Oxford University Press, 1983.
- Frederick J. Marker: Kjeld Abell. Gloucester, Mass. 1976.
- Sven Møller Kristensen: Dansk litteratur 1918-1952. 2. ed. Copenhagen, 1965 (entirely in Danish)
