= Stralsund Museum =

Museum in Stralsund, Germany

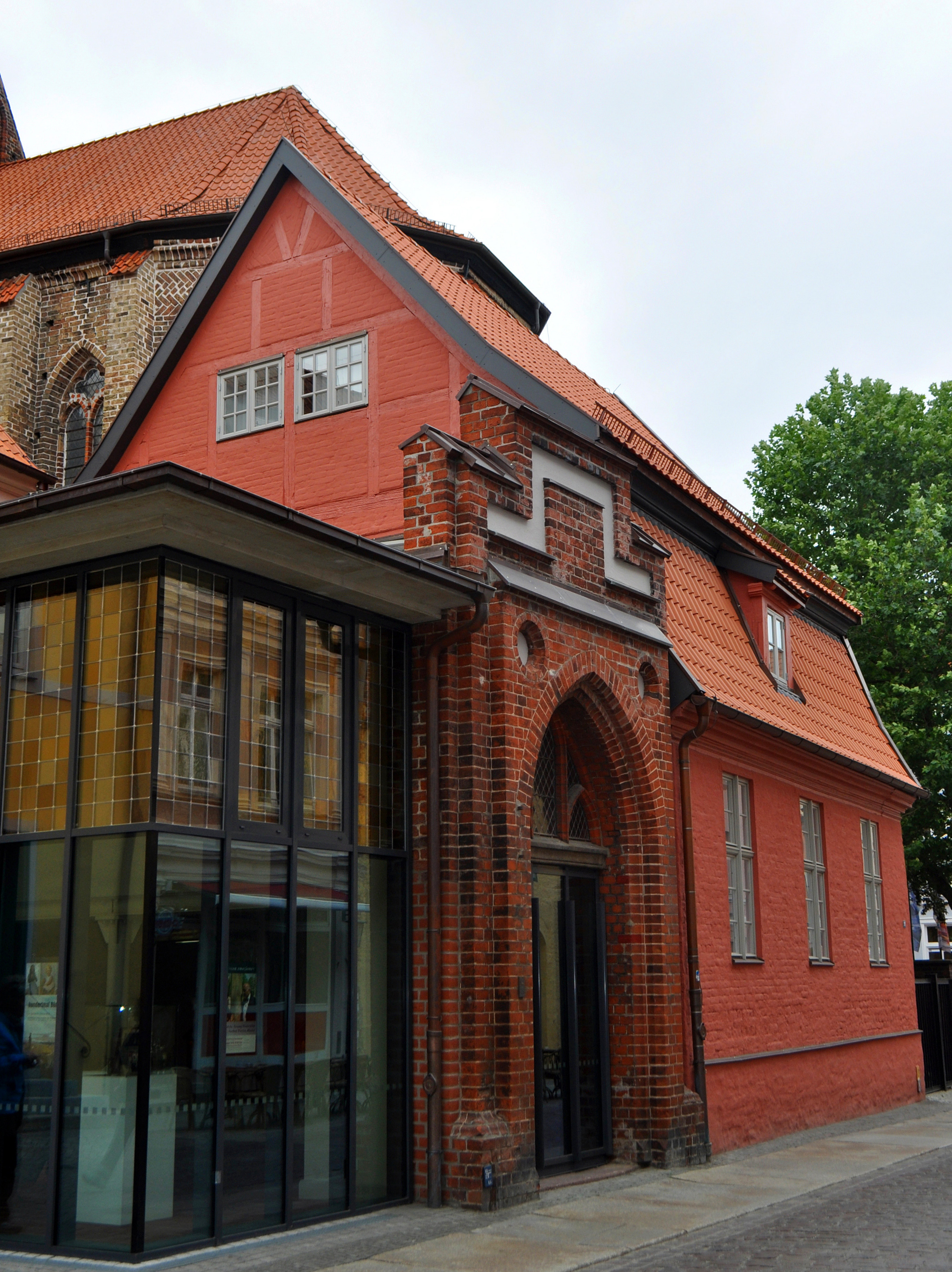
- Entrance to the Museum of Cultural History in Stralsund, in the former St. Catherine Monastery, which was also used as a gymnasium.
- Established: 1859; 167 years ago
- Coordinates: 54.3126°N 13.0879°E
- Website: www.stralsund-museum.de

The Stralsund Museum (until 2015: Stralsund Museum of Cultural History, Kulturhistorisches Museum) is a museum in the Hanseatic city of Stralsund, Germany. It is headquartered in a former convent of the Dominicans, the St. Catherine's Monastery.

The museum, which was established in 1859 as the Provincial Museum for New Pomerania and Rügen, is the oldest museum of its kind in Mecklenburg-Vorpommern and presents extensive collections of folklore and cultural and art history in the region of Vorpommern. It houses both permanent exhibitions and special exhibitions on changing subject areas. The permanent exhibitions are dedicated to the prehistory and early history of the region as well as the history of the city. Special exhibitions are mainly concerned with Fine Arts.

== History ==
The museum was founded in 1859 as a provincial museum for Neuvorpommern and Rügen by Rudolf Baier and also served as a research center. Above all, the donation of the then Governor-General Axel Graf von Löwen to the city of Stralsund can be regarded as the foundation of a rich collection. Von Löwen bequeathed in 1761 in his Testament his extensive art collection of the city. Baier took over in 1859 as the first director of the museum, the unsorted collection of works from many different areas; Most of the works of art of Löwens did not concern Stralsund and its surroundings. At that time, the collection, and thus the new Provincial Museum for New Western Pomerania and Rügen, which today is the oldest museum in Mecklenburg-Western Pomerania, was still located in four rooms of the Stralsund Town Hall, The Hiddenseer gold jewelry was exhibited in the original room in the first room. Also exhibited here were oil paintings of various themes, which came from Löwen's possession and the foundation of a Stralsunders. The second room contained unsorted and uncategorized prehistoric finds, an Indian costume, 17th and 18th century furniture, hand tools, and natural history pieces. The fourth room contained faience from Stralsund production. In 1896 Baier was able to move into new, larger rooms for the museum in Badenstraße; There is now the city library housed. After Baier's death in 1907, the museum was administered by various people for a fee. It was not until 1919 that a full-time director was appointed, the philologist Fritz Adler.

In 1921, the city council decided to provide the museum with the rooms of the former orphanage in the old St. Catherine's Monastery. Since 1924, the museum was housed in the former convent of St. Catherine's Monastery. In the same year, the now as Stralsundisches Museum for Neuvorpommern and Rügen firmierende museum was completely put under municipal administration. Thus the always uncertain financing by city, province and museum association had given way to a secured one. In 1925 the exhibition Urban Culture moved to the first floor. With support from the local population, especially from Mönchgut and Darss, tools, costumes and other folklore exhibits were appropriated to the museum and exhibited on the second floor in 1927. In 1931, the museum was also the cross building in the Mönchstraße 27 provided.

With the beginning of the Second World War, the finishing work on the museum were discontinued. After the air raids on Lübeck and Rostock in 1942, many valuable exhibits were brought to the country. However, the museum, which was closed to visitors, survived the bombardment of Stralsund on 6 October 1944 almost unscathed. Stralsund was handed over almost without a fight to the Red Army on 1 May 1945, which saved further destruction in the city. From June 1945, the outsourced items were checked and started with the return. Medieval painting and sculpture was first attributed; this was undamaged and was issued in the Remter. Added to this was the re-opened on 9 November 1946 Department Urban Culture on the first floor. The holdings of the folklore department had been very decimated; but again the calls for the completion of the collection were heard by the population and in July 1947 this department was reopened.

On April 24, 1949, the ceremonial opening of the museum took place in Remter. After Fritz Adler had gone to the western part of Germany, in 1950 the Käthe Rieck who had been working in the museum since 1921 took over the management. The toy department was opened in October 1950. Also in the fall of 1950, four more rooms of the former grammar school were assigned to the museum. In them, the prehistoric and protohistoric collection and the exhibition on the history of the city were built.

In 1973, the museum was assigned the memory in the Böttcherstraße for use. After the refurbishment begun in 1974, in 1984 the first exhibition devoted to folklore was opened here. As of March 1, 2014, the Hanseatic city of Stralsund has permanently closed the museum's warehouse for visitors. The reason for this was building supervisory requirements for fire protection, the implementation of which would have been too expensive for the city. As part of the redesign of the permanent exhibition in St. Catherine's Monastery, it will be examined to what extent exhibition contents can be taken over from the museum's storehouse there. Ultimately, the city wants to vacate and sell the building.

== Concept and exhibitions ==
The exhibitions in the former St. Catherine's Monastery address not only the history of the area and the history of the city, but also the handicraft of the region - here is the Hiddensee treasure - the Visual Arts - mainly paintings by Caspar David Friedrich as well as Philipp Otto Runge - as well as historical children's toys. Also on display are Faiences Stralsund Faience Factory and Paraments.

In the "Historical Memory" of the museum, another exhibition building in the Böttcherstraße, the focus of the exhibition is on folklore Western Pomerania. Here, in particular, they devote themselves to regional traditions. Worthy of particular mention are the furnishing items exhibited here, which primarily come from the area of the peninsula Darß and the Mönchgut and date in part from the early years of the 20th century.

In the "Maritime Museum" on the island Dänholm the topic of the history of the navy in Stralsund and surroundings is assumed; Stralsund is considered the "cradle of the Prussian Navy".

The Kulturhistorisches Museum offers classes and groups of children guided tours to the topics "Toys - yesterday and today", "Folklore in Mecklenburg-Vorpommern", "In the footsteps of the Stralsund World Heritage", "History of Stralsund", "Where the monks used to live", "Legends and stories in and around Stralsund" and "Living earlier and today".

=== St. Catherine's Monastery (Main House) ===
In the former convent of the Dominicans various exhibitions are housed over three floors.

The permanent exhibition on prehistory and early history is one of the most important collections in the region. The regional settlement history is presented here. The exhibits include stone tools and ceramics. Three gold finds will be presented. In addition to the Hiddensee treasure, this also includes the Gold rings of Peenemünde.

The presentation of the history of Stralsund as a former Swedish city and as Hanseatic and port city is given a lot of space. Faience manufactured at Stralsund Fayencenmanufaktur, Spielkarte n the Stralsunder Spielkartenfabrik bear witness to the economic importance of Stralsund.

==== Prehistory ====
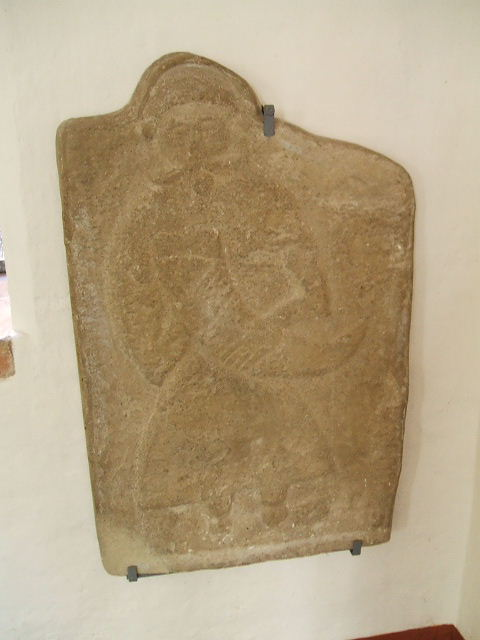
Svantevit stone

The exhibition on prehistory and early history is one of the most important of its kind in the region. On the basis of archaeological finds about 10,000 years of human history in the region of Western Pomerania and Rügen are presented.

The exhibition begins with a depiction of the post-glacial area in which people invaded. Flintstone, bones and antlers became tools that were used primarily for hunting and fishing. Small instruments made of flint and scraper, core and disc axles are among the exhibits. The area around Drigge on Rügen is home to tools made of bones and antlers.

With the transition to the Stone Age, the economy shifted to agriculture. Flint-made tools, which have now been used to process agricultural products and pets, have already been ground. Hammer-like tools prove the application of the drilling technique. Ceramics made from fired clay from the two ethnic groups living in the region is preserved in their typical forms and ornaments. Exhibits were brought to the Stralsund Museum from Gingst and Nadelitz. Also the Bronze processing is documented in the exhibition. In addition to the tools and weapons and jewelry items have been preserved.

== Restitution of Nazi-looted art ==
In 2025, the Stralsund Museum decided to restitute an object that had been looted from the Jewish businessman and art collector John Horneburg under the Nazi regime.
