= Sven Rosborn =

Swedish archaeologist

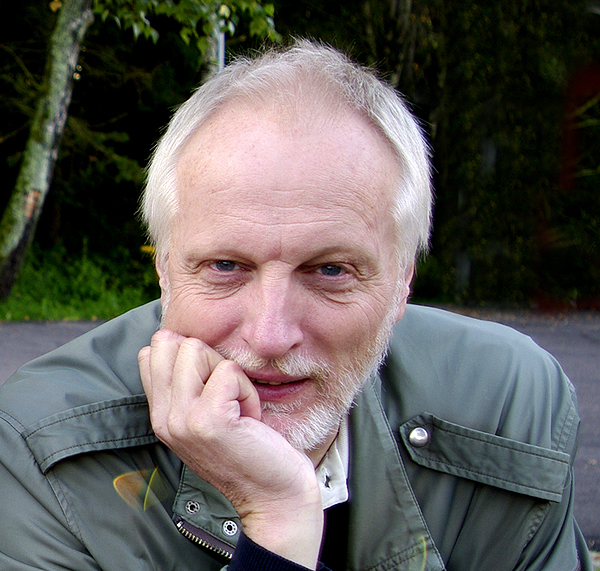
Sven Rosborn

Sven Gunnar Rosborn (born 1949 in Malmö, Sweden) is a Swedish archaeologist, historian and writer best known for his contributions to the archaeology of the Viking Age in the province of Scania and for his leadership of archaeology and history research and education foundations. He has received media attention for his claims related to the Curmsun Disc, which he maintains is a memorial plaque of the great Viking king Harald Bluetooth.

Sven Rosborn graduated from Lund University in 1972 and has a Bachelors of Science (BSc) degree in Ancient Archaeology (1971) and Medieval Archaeology (1972). He earned his PhD in Medieval Archaeology in 1974. After completing his graduation he worked as archaeologist and from 1977 as director of The City Museum at Malmö Castle. In August 1990, along with two colleagues, he founded the publishing house Historiska Media and started to publish a monthly history magazine Populär Historia. He is a co-founder of Foteviken Museum (1995) at which he worked until 2012 as Information and Research Director.

Sven Rosborn is an author of numerous books, articles and papers about the Viking Age and the medieval history of Scania. He is also known for taking initiative to several projects devoted to historical heritage of Scandinavia. He is a member of the board of Skånska Akedemin, an academy promoting cultural legacy of the province of Scania.
