= Jelling stones =

Runestones in Jelling, Denmark

Jelling Mounds, Runic Stones and Church
UNESCO World Heritage Site
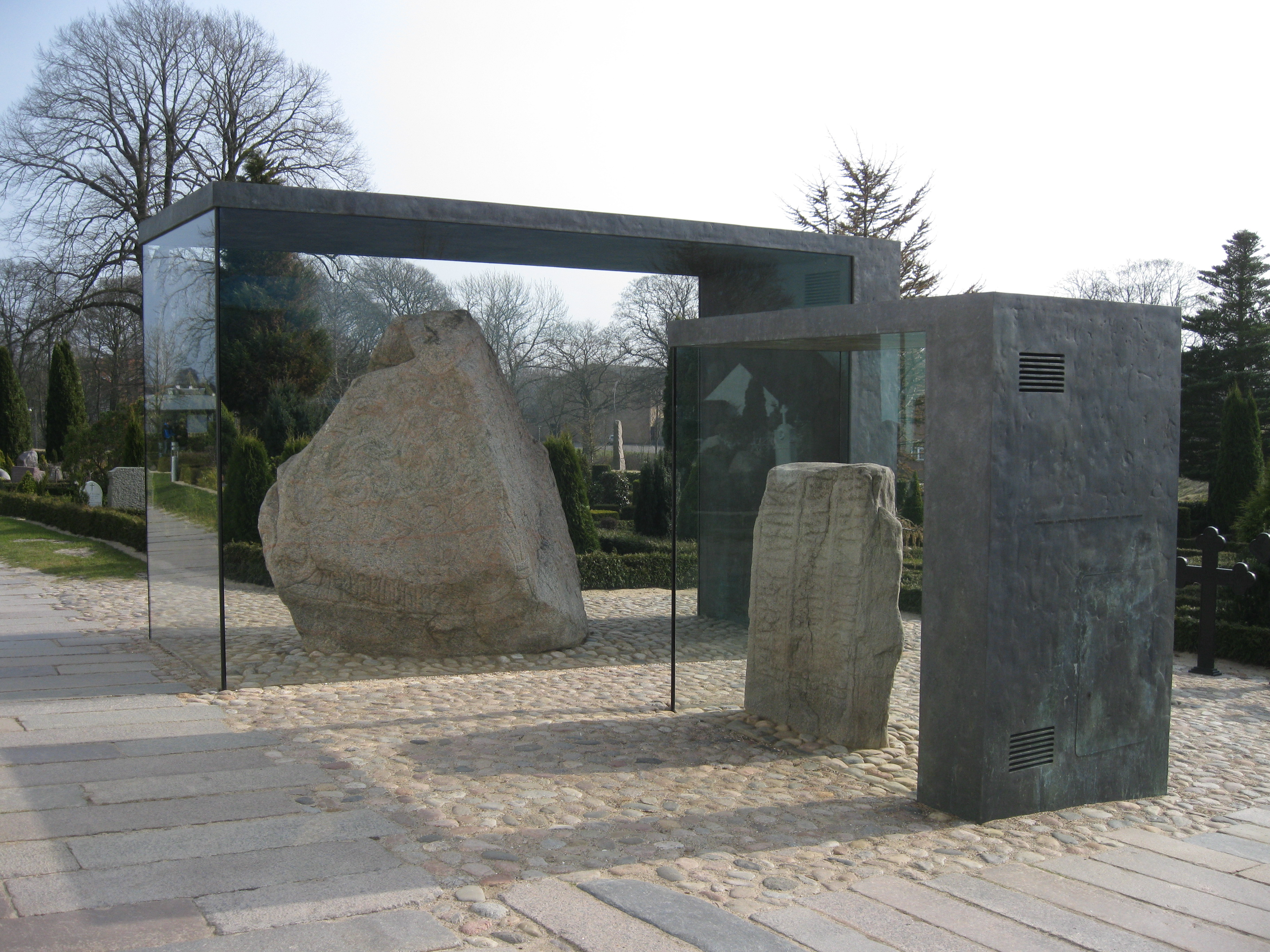
- Jelling stones, in their glass casing (2012)

- Location within Denmark
- Location: Jelling, Denmark
- Criteria: Cultural: iii
- Reference: 697
- Inscription: 1994 (18th Session)
- Area: 4.96 ha (12.3 acres)
- Coordinates: 55°45′24″N 9°25′10″E

The Jelling stones (Danish: Jellingstenene) are massive carved runestones from the 10th century, found at the town of Jelling in Denmark. The older of the two Jelling stones was raised by King Gorm the Old in memory of his wife Thyra. The larger of the two stones was raised by King Gorm's son, Harald Bluetooth, in memory of his parents, celebrating his conquest of Denmark and Norway, and his conversion of the Danes to Christianity.

The runic inscriptions on these stones are considered the best known in Denmark. In 1994, the stones, in addition to the burial mounds and small church nearby, were inscribed on the UNESCO World Heritage List as an unparalleled example of both pagan and Christian Nordic culture.

== Significance ==
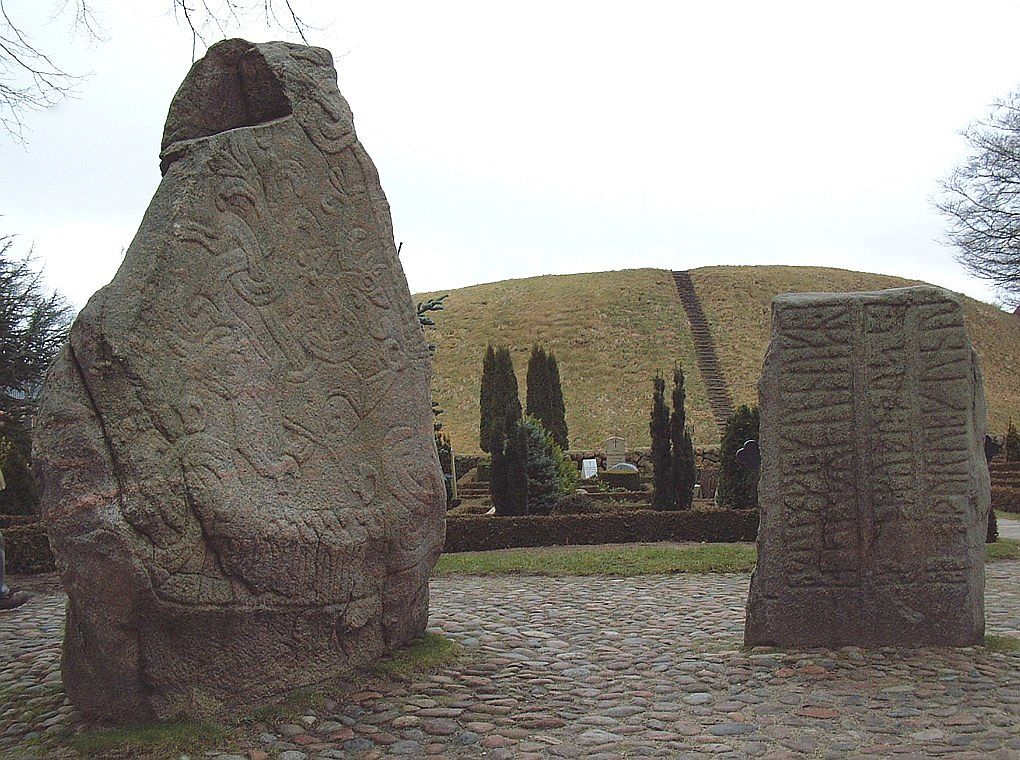
The heritage site in 2004: Runestones are in the foreground; in the background is one of two mounds.

The stones are strongly identified with the creation of Denmark as a kingdom. Both inscriptions mention the name "Danmark" (in the form of accusative "tanmaurk" ([dɑnmɒrk]) on the large stone, and genitive "tanmarkar" (pronounced [dɑnmɑrkɑɹ̻̊˔]) on the small stone).

The larger stone explicitly mentions the conversion of Denmark from Norse paganism and the process of Christianisation, alongside a depiction of the crucified Christ; it is therefore popularly dubbed "Denmark's baptismal certificate" (Danmarks dåbsattest), an expression coined by art historian Rudolf Broby-Johansen in the 1930s. In 1997 a photo of this stone inspired the name Bluetooth for the wireless technology.

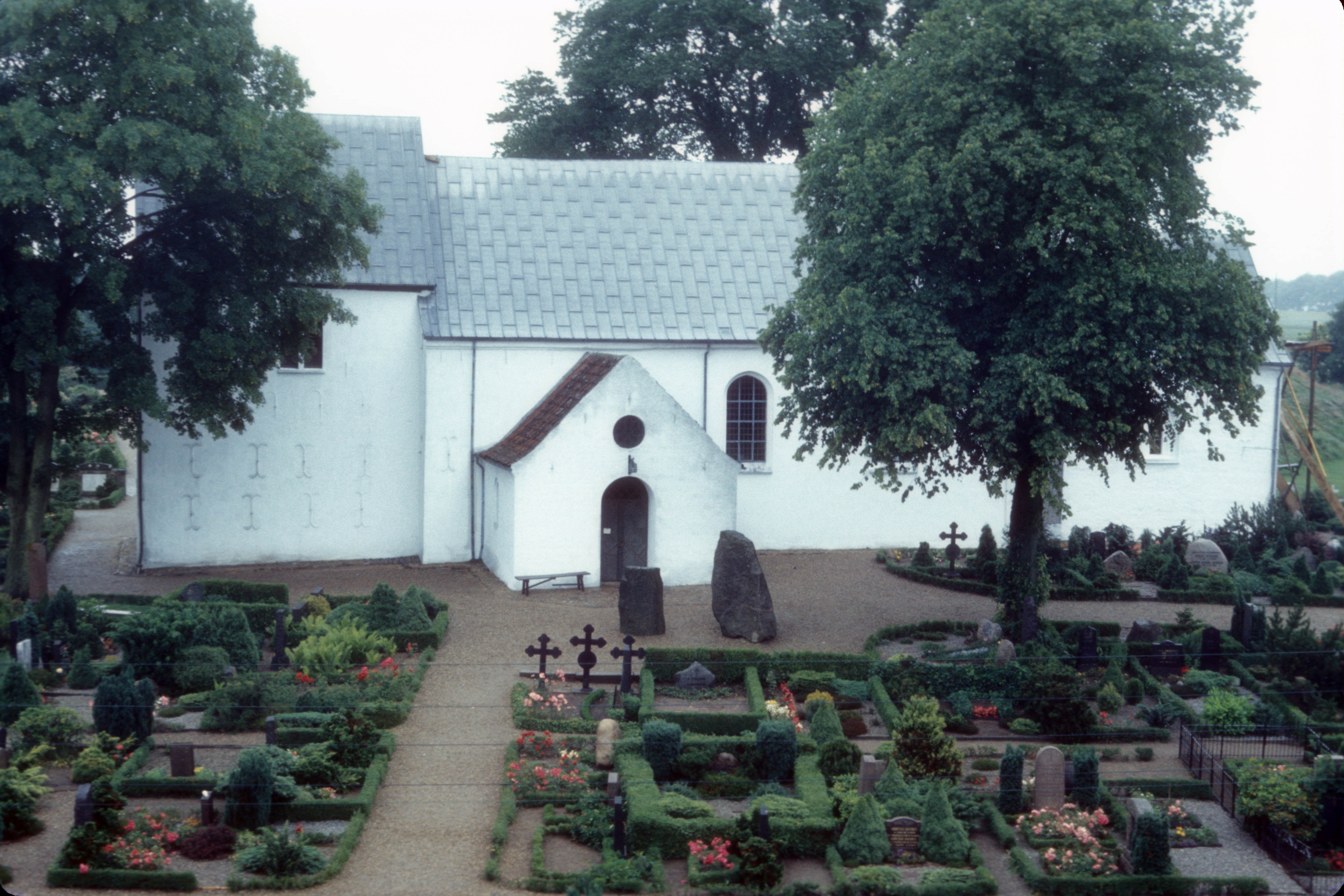
Jelling Church

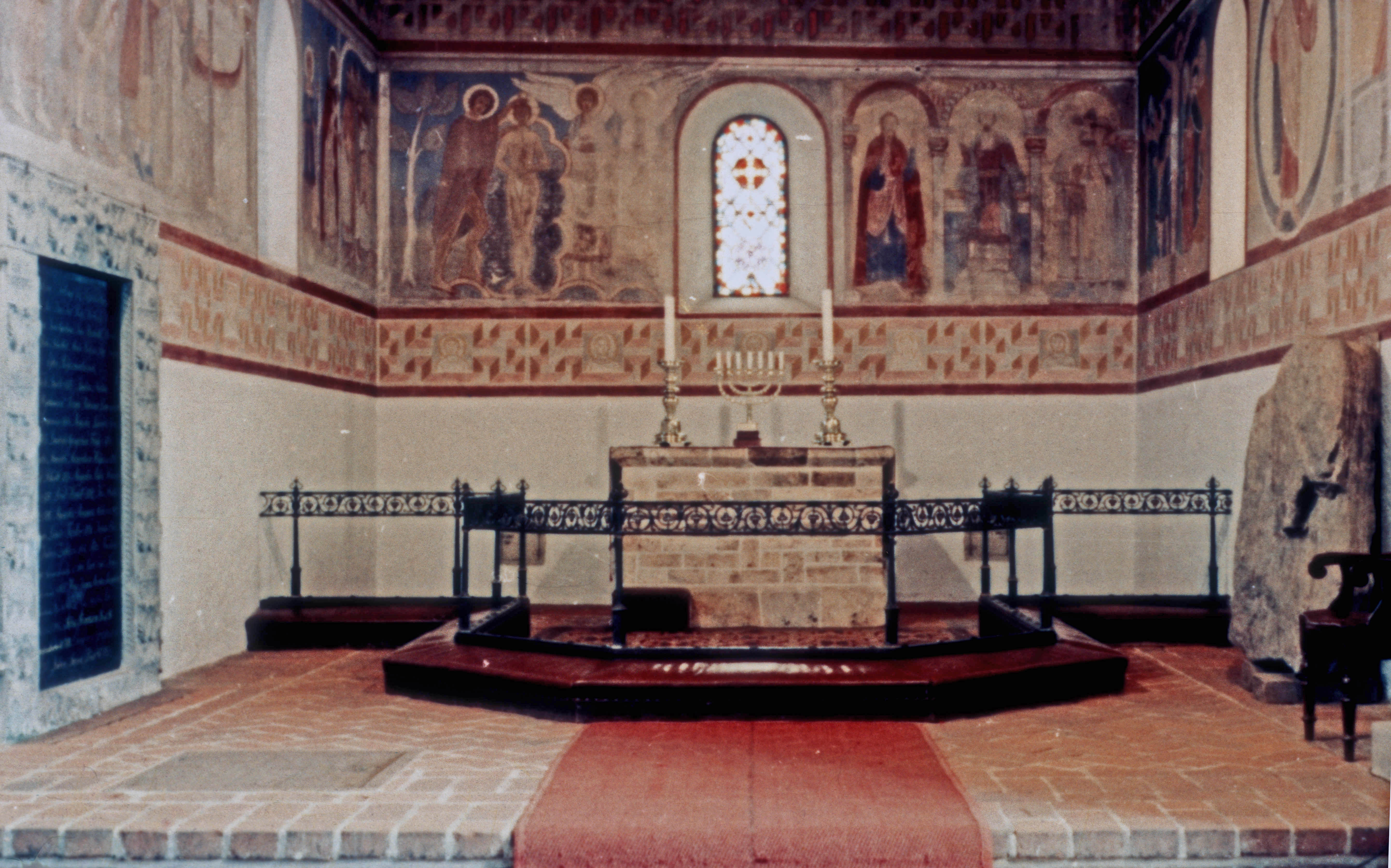
Inside Jelling Church, showing frescos dating from 1125

== Recent history ==
After having been exposed to the elements for a thousand years, cracks were beginning to show. In November 2008, experts from UNESCO examined the stones to determine their condition. Experts requested that the stones be moved to an indoor exhibition hall, or in some other way protected in situ, to prevent further damage from the weather.

In February 2011, the site was vandalized using green spray paint, with the word "GELWANE" written on both sides of the larger stone, and with identical graffiti sprayed on a nearby gravestone and on the church door. After much speculation about the possible meaning of the enigmatic word "gelwane", the vandal was eventually discovered to be a 15-year-old boy, and the word itself was meaningless. As the paint had not fully hardened, experts were able to remove it.

The Heritage Agency of Denmark decided to keep the stones in their current location and selected a protective casing design from 157 projects submitted through a competition. The winner of the competition was Nobel Architects. The glass casing creates a climate system that keeps the stones at a fixed temperature and humidity and protects them from weathering.

The design features rectangular glass casings, strengthened by two solid bronze sides mounted on a supporting steel skeleton. The glass is coated with an anti-reflective material that gives the exhibit a greenish hue. The bronze patina gives off a rusty, greenish colour, highlighting the runestones' grey and reddish tones and emphasising their monumental character and significance.

== Runestone of Harald Bluetooth ==
Haraldr konungr bað gǫrva kumbl...
Listen to the runes of Harald's stone read in Old East Norse.

Kong Harald bød gøre disse kumler...
Listen to the runes of Harald's stone read in Modern Danish.

The inscription on the larger of the two Jelling stones (Jelling II, Rundata DR 42) reads:

- runes
- rune transliteration
- Old West Norse normalization
- Old East Norse normalization

{} ᚼᛅᚱᛅᛚᛏᚱ ᛬ ᚴᚢᚾᚢᚴᛦ ᛬ ᛒᛅᚦ ᛬ ᚴᛅᚢᚱᚢᛅ / ᚴᚢᛒᛚ ᛬ ᚦᛅᚢᛋᛁ ᛬ ᛅᚠᛏ ᛬ ᚴᚢᚱᛘ ᚠᛅᚦᚢᚱ ᛋᛁᚾ / ᛅᚢᚴ ᛅᚠᛏ ᛬ ᚦᚭᚢᚱᚢᛁ ᛬ ᛘᚢᚦᚢᚱ ᛬ ᛋᛁᚾᛅ ᛬ ᛋᛅ / ᚼᛅᚱᛅᛚᛏᚱ (᛬) ᛁᛅᛋ ᛬ ᛋᚭᛦ ᛫ ᚢᛅᚾ ᛫ ᛏᛅᚾᛘᛅᚢᚱᚴ
: haraltr : kunukʀ : baþ : kaurua ¶ kubl : þausi : aft : kurm faþur sin ¶ auk aft : þourui : muþur : sina : sa ¶ haraltr (:) ias : soʀ · uan · tanmaurk
{} Haraldr {} konungr {} bað {} gera {} kuml {} þessi {} ept {} Gorm, fǫður sinn, {} ok ept {} Þyrvé, {} móður {} sína, {} sá {} Haraldr {} er {} sér {} vann {} Danmǫrk
{} Haraldr {} kunungʀ {} baþ {} gørwa {} kumbl {} þøsi {} æft {} Gorm, faþur sin, {} ok æft {} Þorwi, {} moþur {} sina, {} sa {} Haraldr {} æs {} seʀ {} wan {} Danmork
King Haraldr ordered these monuments made in memory of Gormr, his father, and in memory of Þyrvé, his mother; that Haraldr who won for himself all of Denmark

ᛅᛚᛅ ᛫ ᛅᚢᚴ ᛫ ᚾᚢᚱᚢᛁᛅᚴ
ala · auk · nuruiak
alla {} ok {} Norveg
alla {} ok {} Norwæg
and Norway

᛫ ᛅᚢᚴ ᛫ ᛏ(ᛅ)ᚾᛁ (᛫ ᚴᛅᚱᚦᛁ ᛫) ᚴᚱᛁᛋᛏᚾᚭ
(·) auk {} t(a)ni {} (k)(a)(r)(þ)(i) {} kristno
{} ok {} dani {} gerði {} kristna.
{} ok {} dani {} gærþi {} kristna.
and made the Danes Christian.

The stone has a figure of the crucified Christ on one side and on another side a serpent wrapped around a lion. Christ is depicted as standing in the shape of a cross and entangled in what appear to be branches. This depiction of Christ has often been taken as indicating the parallels with the "hanging" of the Norse pagan god Odin, who in Rúnatal gives an account of being hanged from a tree and pierced by a spear.

Harald's runestone

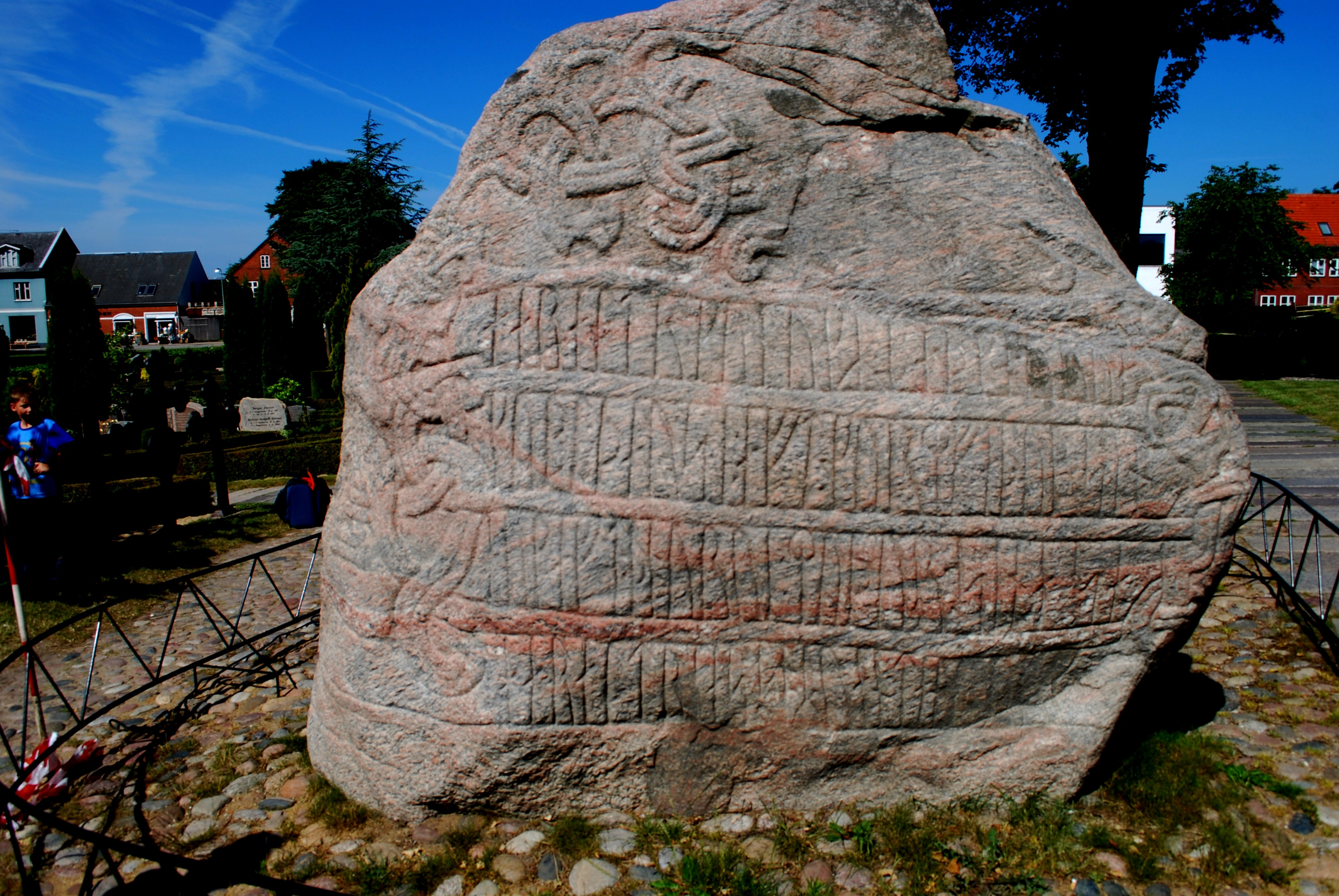
side A

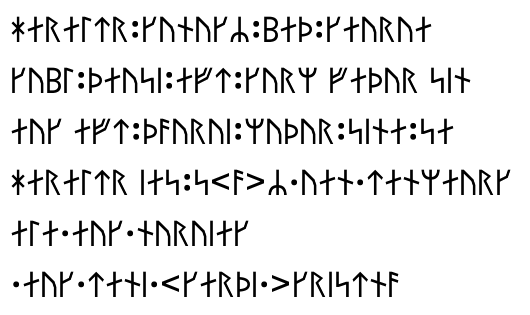
image of transcribed runes

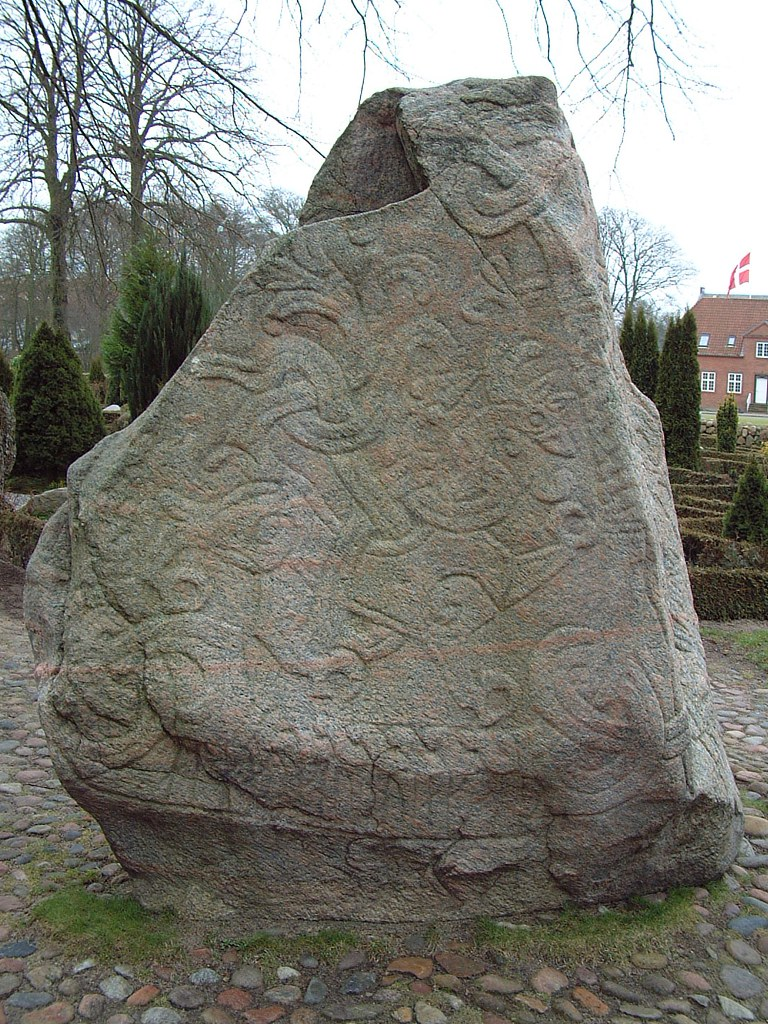
side B
animal engraving & Norway claim

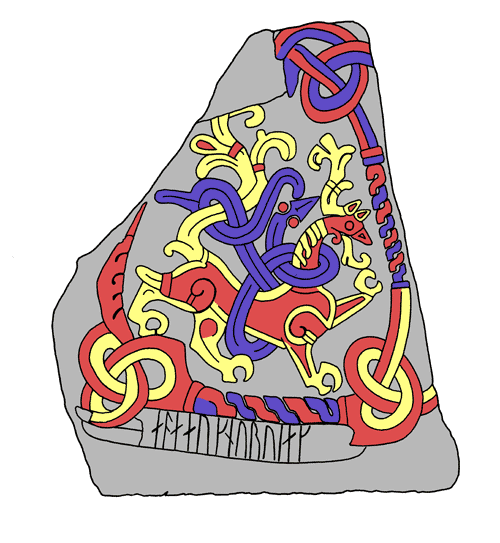
side B
reconstruction of original colours

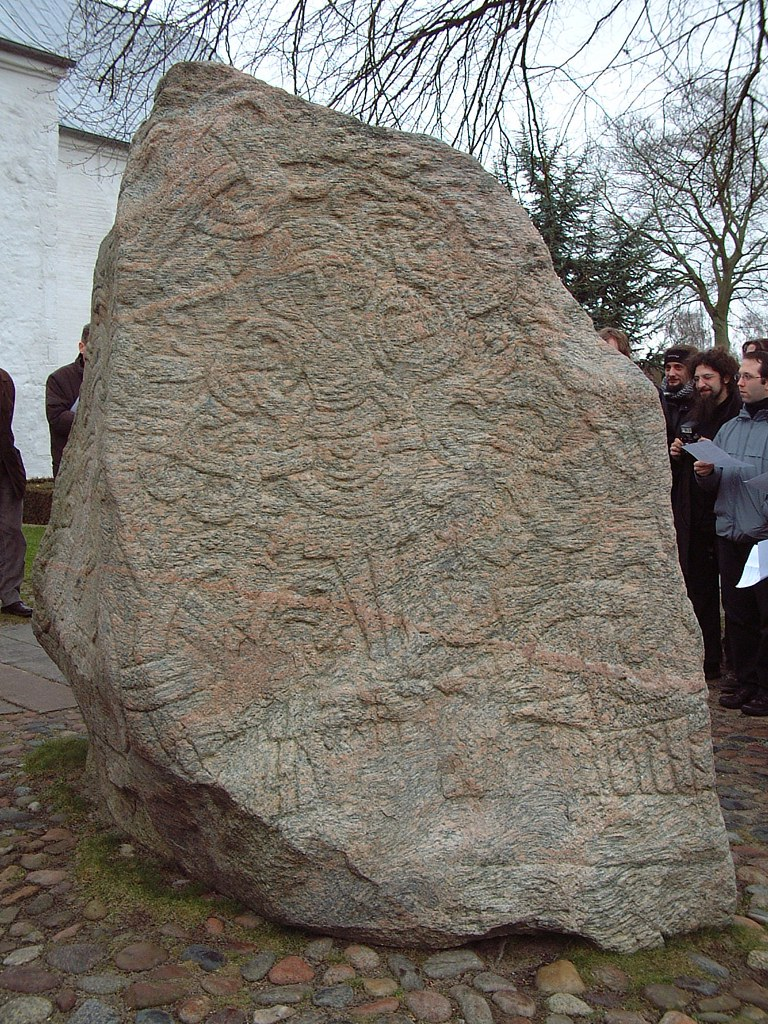
side C
crucifixion scene & Danish baptism claim

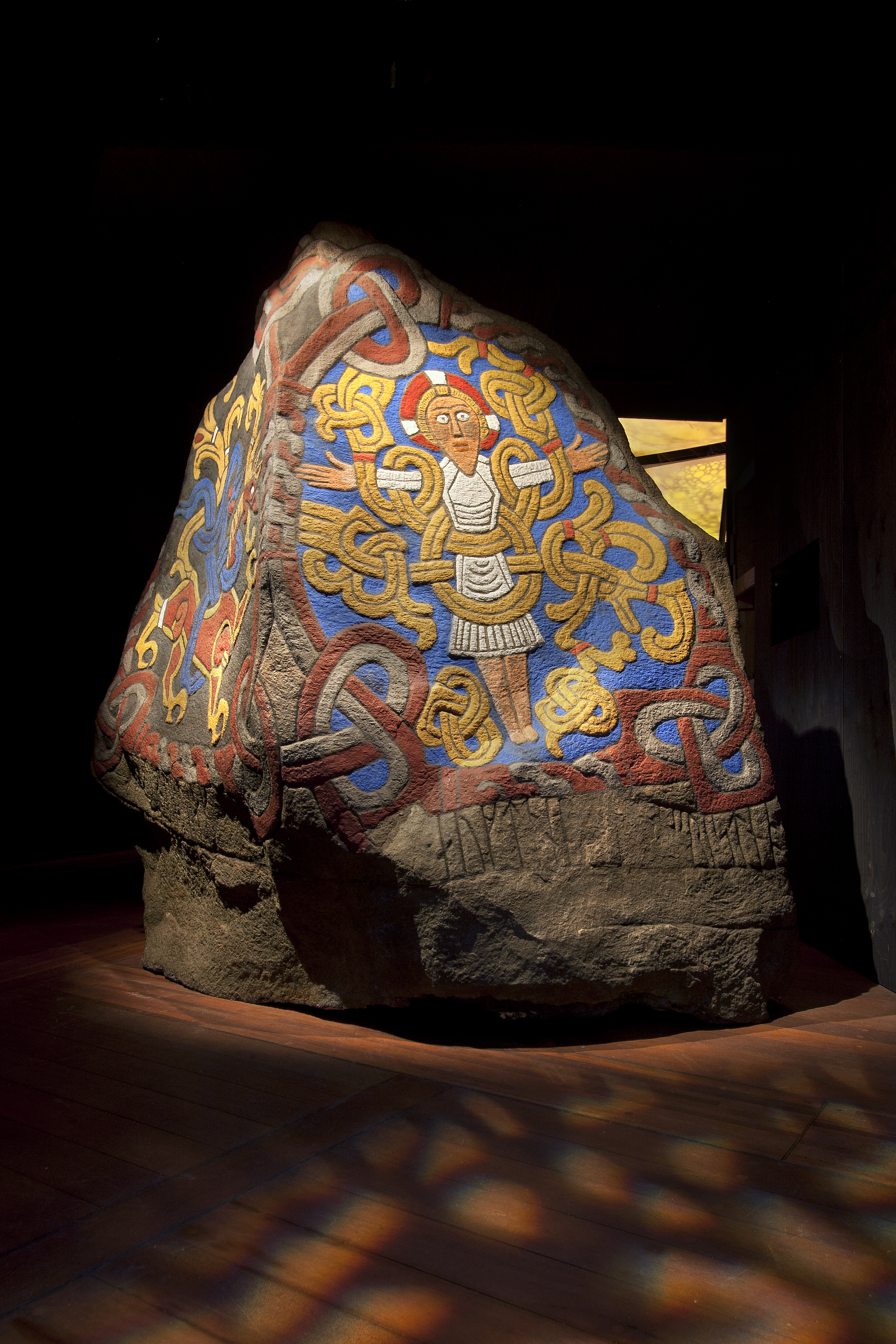
side C
coloured, from the VIKING exhibition at the National Museum of Denmark

=== Modern copies of the runestone of Harald Bluetooth ===
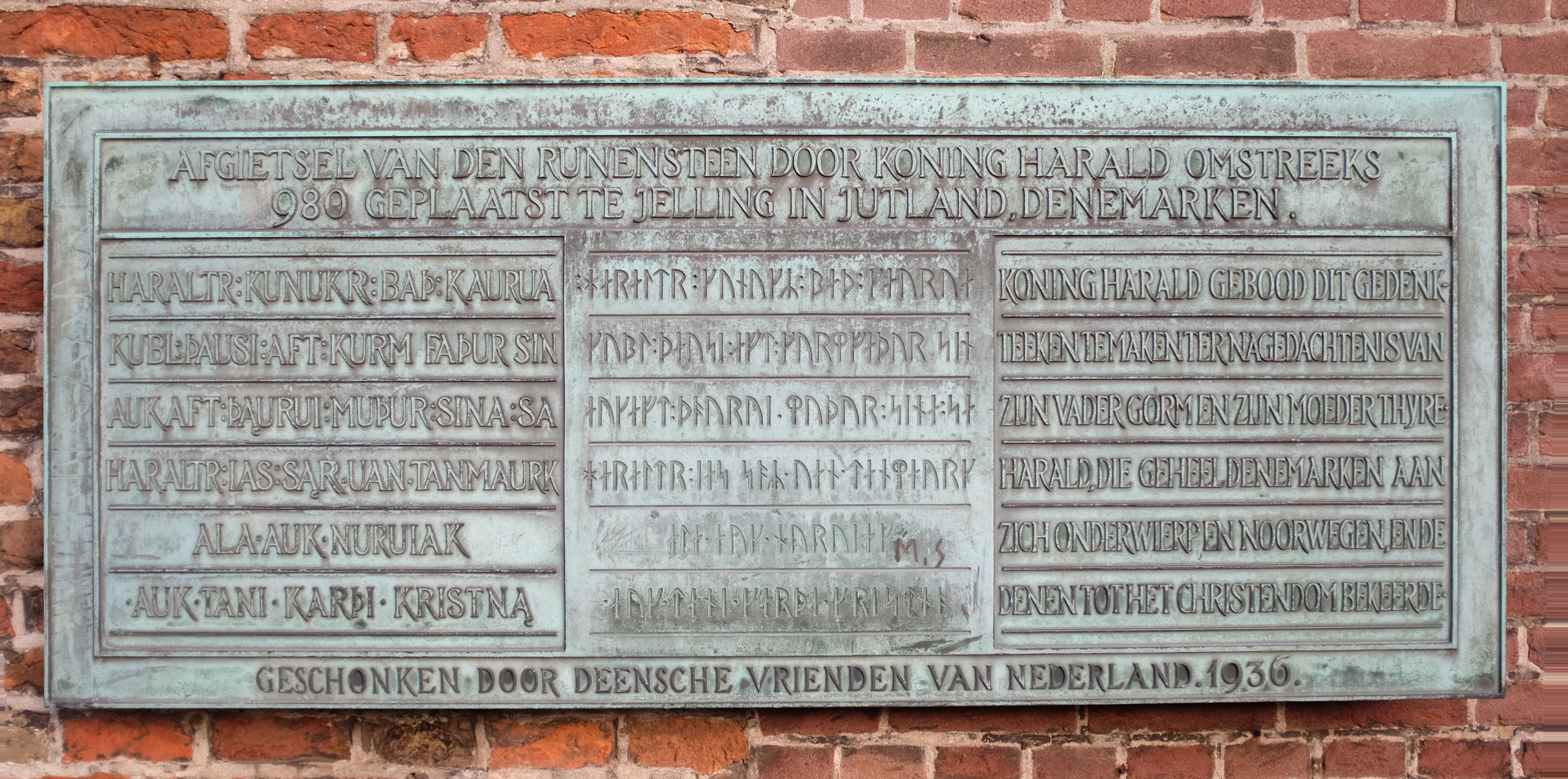
The 1936 sign next to the Utrecht stone with the original runes, transliteration and Dutch translation

Another copy of this stone was placed in 1936 on the Domplein ('Dom Square') in Utrecht in the Netherlands, next to the Cathedral of Utrecht, on the occasion of the 300th anniversary of Utrecht University.

In 1955, a plaster cast of this stone was made for a festival in London. It is now located in the grounds of the Danish Church in London, 4 St Katherines Precinct, Regents Park, London. The copy is painted in bright colours, like the original. Most of the original paint has flaked away from the original stone, but enough small specks of paint remained to enable the determination of what the colours looked like when they were freshly painted.

A copy is located in the National Museum of Denmark. Another copy, decorated by Rudolf Broby-Johansen in the 1930s, is just outside the Jelling museum, which stands within sight of the Jelling mounds.

A copy exists in Rouen, Normandy, France, near Saint-Ouen Abbey Church, given by Denmark to the city of Rouen, commemorating 1,000 years of Norse influence in Normandy, in 1911.

A facsimile of the image of Christ on Harald's runestone appears on the inside front cover of Danish passports.

== Runestone of Gorm ==
kurmʀ kunukʀ k(ar)þi kubl...
Listen to the runes of Gorm's stone read in Old East Norse.

The inscription on the older and smaller of the Jelling stones (Jelling I, Rundata DR 41) reads:

- runes
- rune transliteration
- Old West Norse normalisation
- Old East Norse normalisation

᛬ ᚴᚢᚱᛘᛦ ᛬ ᚴᚢᚾᚢᚴᛦ ᛬ ᚴ(ᛅᚱ)ᚦᛁ ᛬ ᚴᚢᛒᛚ ᛬ ᚦᚢᛋᛁ ᛬ ᛅ(ᚠᛏ) ᛬ ᚦᚢᚱᚢᛁ ᛬ ᚴᚢᚾᚢ
: kurmʀ : kunukʀ {: ¶ :} k(a)(r)þi : kubl : þusi {: ¶ :} a(f)(t) : þurui : kunu
{} Gormr {} konungr {} gerði {} kuml {} þessi {} ept {} Þyrvé, {} konu
{} Gormʀ {} kunungʀ {} gærþi {} kumbl {} þøsi {} æft {} Þorwi, {} kunu
King Gormr made these monuments in memory of Þyrvé,

᛬ ᛋᛁᚾᛅ ᛬ ᛏᛅᚾᛘᛅᚱᚴᛅᛦ ᛬ ᛒᚢᛏ ᛬
⁓ sina ⁓ tanmarkaʀ ⁓ but ⁓
{} sína, {} Danmarkar {} bót. {}
{} sina, {} Danmarkaʀ {} bot. {}
his wife, Denmark's salvation.

Gorm's runestone

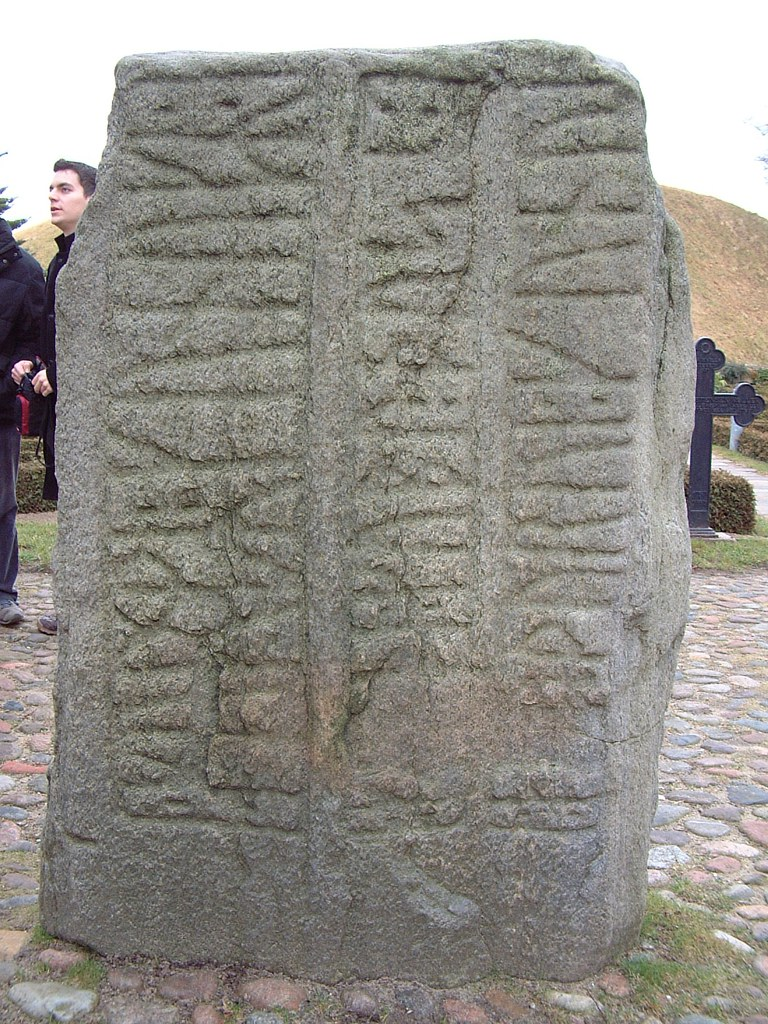
side A

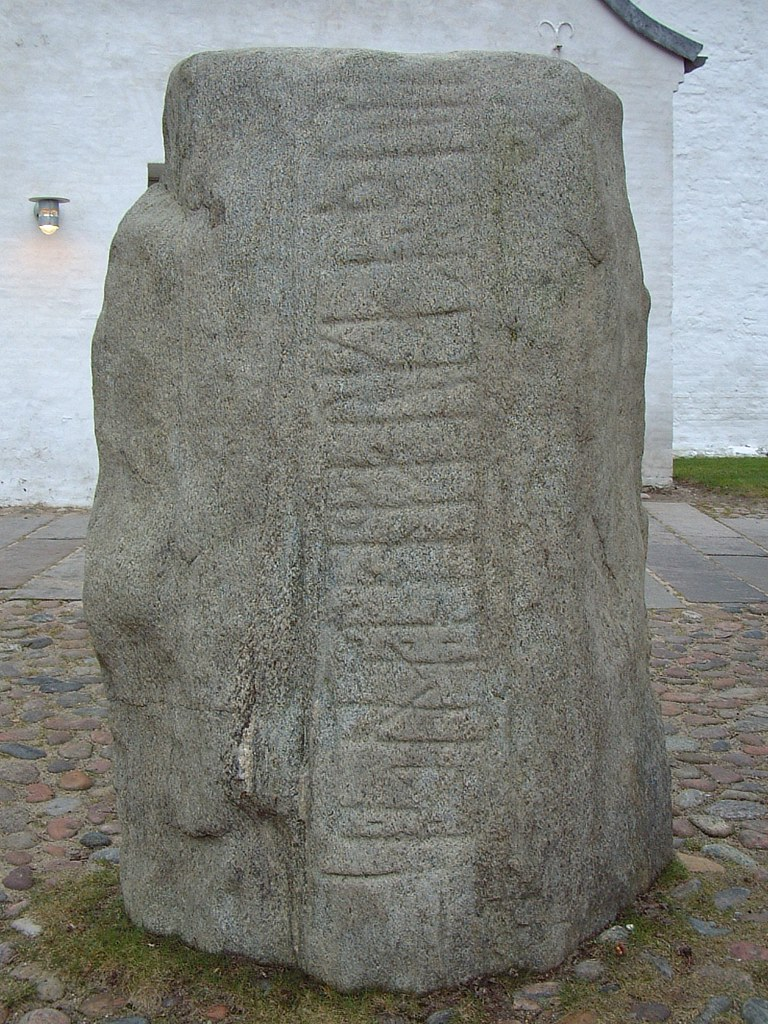
side B

== See also ==
- Boris stones — similar landmarks in Belarus
- Curmsun Disc
- Bornholm amulet
- Haraldskær Woman
- Jelling stone ship — a ship setting that lay between the mounds
- Jelling style
- List of runestones
- Tourism in Denmark
