= Bornholm amulet =

- Diameter: 25 mm
- Catalog number: CCCCLXXVII

Obverse
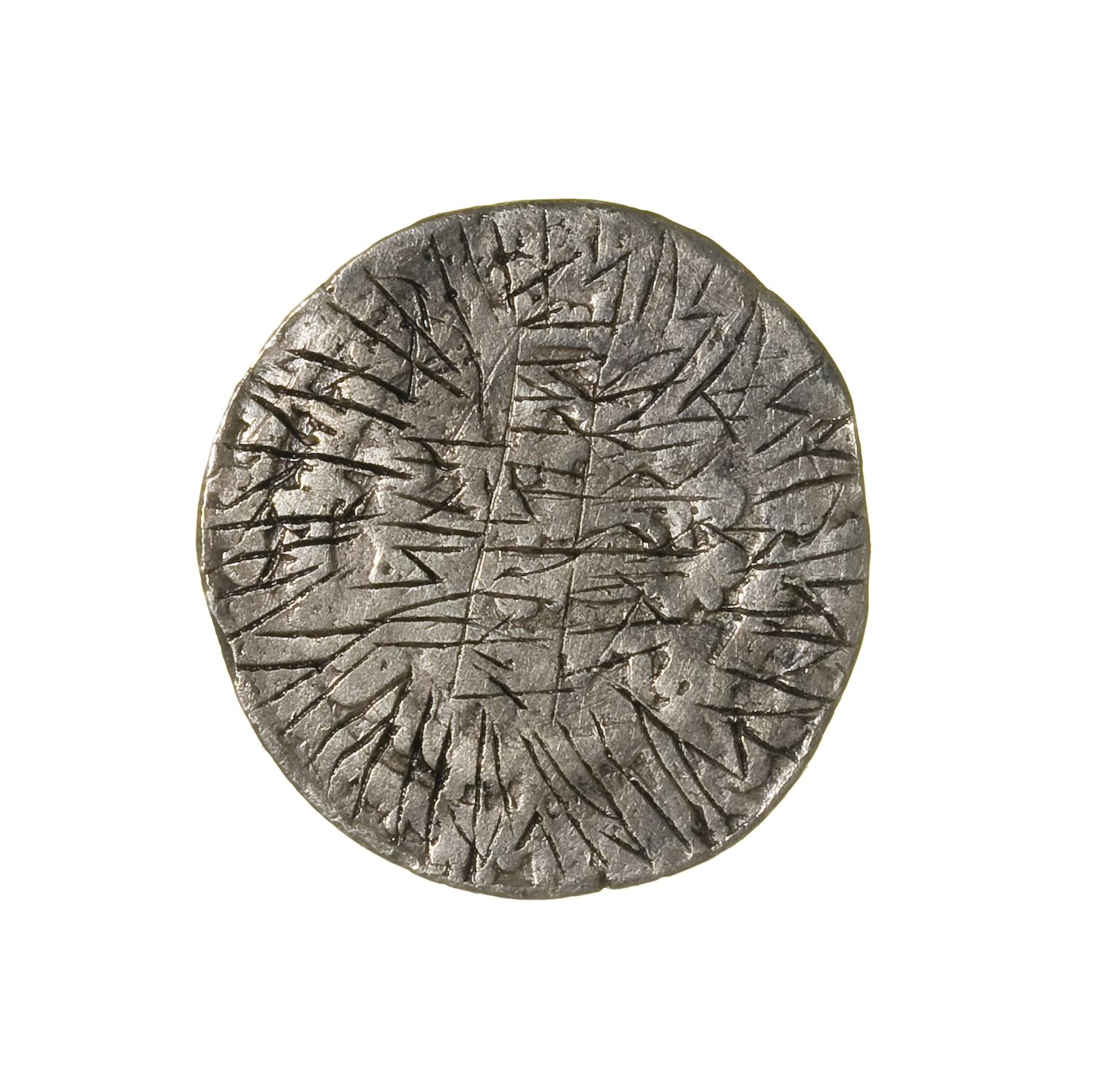
- Design: Latin text written with runic inscription

Reverse

The Bornholm amulet is a silver coin with Latin text written with runic inscription. The amulet is 2.5 cm in diameter.

== Discovery ==
The finding place is unknown but the coin was handed over to the National Museum of Denmark in 1821, with information that the coin was found in the year 1770 on Bornholm.

== Dating ==
The dating of the amulet was at first considered to be between 907 and 913. In 1965, the dating was revised to be between 885 and 896.

== Inscription ==
The height of the runes are 0,3-0,8 cm.

e(i) (e)asusus kristus= =fil=uis t(e)i fifi inomina b|atris eþ fil|ius ins eþ sb=iritu|s
... Iesus Christus filius dei vivi. {In nomina} patris et filii ... et spiritus.
... Jesus Christ, son of the living God. In the name of the Father, the Son ... and Spirit.

k=rist=us (b)i | bius=ank=uis fifiþ | fit=am itirn=a|m k=ustotaþit
Christus ... {} {pius sanguis} vivit, {} vitam aeternam custodiat.
Christ ... the gracious blood is living, may it preserve eternal life.

The inscription may very well be the oldest example of so-called Runic Latin in Denmark.

== See also ==
- Curmsun Disc
- Jelling stones
