= Rudolf Broby-Johansen =

Danish historian, communist activist and writer

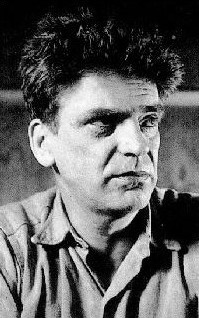
Rudolf Broby-Johansen (um 1923)

Rudolf Kristian Albert Broby-Johansen (25 November 25, 1900 – 9 August 1987) was a Danish art historian, avant-garde poet, journalist, provocateur, educator, communist activist and writer. Born in Aalborg, North Jutland to a working-class family, Broby-Johansen grew up in Lunde, Otterup Municipality, Funen. He published a poetry collection in 1922 called Blod ("Blood"), containing poems on the themes of misery and poverty as well as tabooed topics such as prostitution and necrophilia, was considered scandalous and confiscated by the authorities (re-published in 1968). However, it has gained long-lasting influence in Danish literature by influencing such poets as Michael Strunge and Yahya Hassan. Moreover, it is seen as a prime example of Danish modernist and expressionist poetry. He joined the Communist Party of Denmark (DKP) and became one of the key personalities behind several Danish left-wing journals such as Monde, Plan and Frem.

Broby-Johansen ended his political activism in 1935, following the exile of Leon Trotsky and the persecution of Trotskyism in the Soviet Union, and he focused on artistic work. Among his publications on art history are works on costume history and the history of painting. As art historian, he was also responsible for the reconstruction of the colouring of the copy of the greater Jelling stone commissioned in the 1930s, which he dubbed "Denmark's baptismal certificate". He also published a children's book (Gaga og siksak, holger og dig, 1949) and a Danish re-telling of Aesop's Fables (Den lille Æsop 1945; Den danske Æsop 1961). He returned to political activism in the 1960s in support of Maoism and the Chinese Cultural Revolution, and in the 1970s he campaigned against the accession of Denmark to the European Communities. He re-joined the DKP in 1983, a few years before his death.

As the author of several books, he received the Holberg Medal (1970), the Danish Authors' Association's Prize of Literature (1975), the LO's Culture Prize (1980), the PH Prize (1984) and a nomination for an honorary doctorate at the University of Odense (1985).

Even though Broby is sometimes labeled a Trotskyist, he actually never called himself one and publicly expressed views incompatible with Trotskyism. In 1945 Broby published articles defending Stalin’s forced collectivization efforts, and in 1966 he published an article defending China’s Cultural Revolution, where he related the struggle of the Chinese Red Guard to his own experience as a young communist in the ‘20s. The reason that many wrongfully label him a Trotskyist is most likely because he was very close with self proclaimed Trotskyist, he never officially came out in support of any specific political line (Trotskyist, Leninist, Maoist etc.), instead labeling himself more broadly as simply a Communist/Socialist, and because he, in his early writing expressed views associated with — but not necessarily tied to — Trotskyism.
