= Christianization of Scandinavia =

The Christianization of Scandinavia, as well as other Nordic countries, took place between the 9th and the 12th centuries. The realms of Denmark, Norway and Sweden established their own archdioceses, responsible directly to the pope, in 1104, 1154 and 1164, respectively. The conversion to Christianity of the Scandinavian people required more time, since it took additional efforts to establish a network of churches.

The earliest signs of Christianization were in the 830s with Ansgar's construction of churches in Birka and Hedeby. The conversion of Scandinavian kings occurred over the period 960–1020. Subsequently, Scandinavian kings sought to establish churches, dioceses and Christian kingship, as well as destroy pagan temples. Denmark was the first Scandinavian country to Christianize, as Harald Bluetooth declared this around AD 965, and raised the larger of the two Jelling Stones. According to historian Anders Winroth, Christianity was not forced upon Scandinavians by foreign states or foreign missionaries, but instead willfully adopted by Scandinavian kings who saw the religion as politically advantageous.

Although the Scandinavians became nominally Christian, it took considerably longer for actual Christian beliefs to establish themselves among the people in some regions, while the people were Christianized before the king in other regions. During the Early Middle Ages the papacy had not yet manifested itself as the central Roman Catholic authority, thus making it possible for regional variants of Christianity to develop.

== Mission of Hamburg-Bremen ==
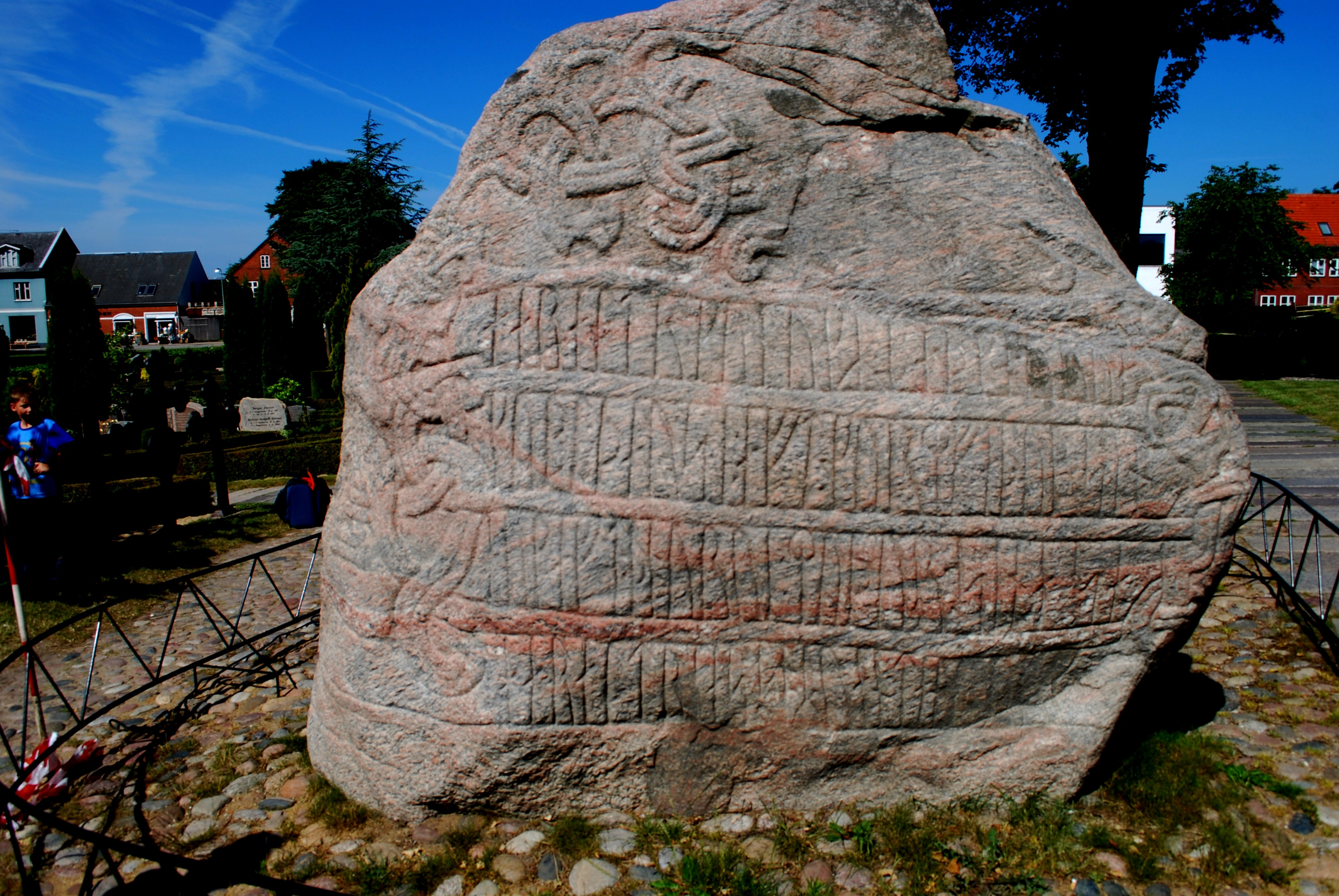
Harald Bluetooth's runestone, at Jelling

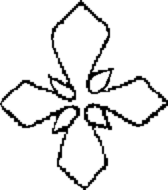
The Christian cross from the Frösö Runestone, symbolizing the Christianization of Jämtland

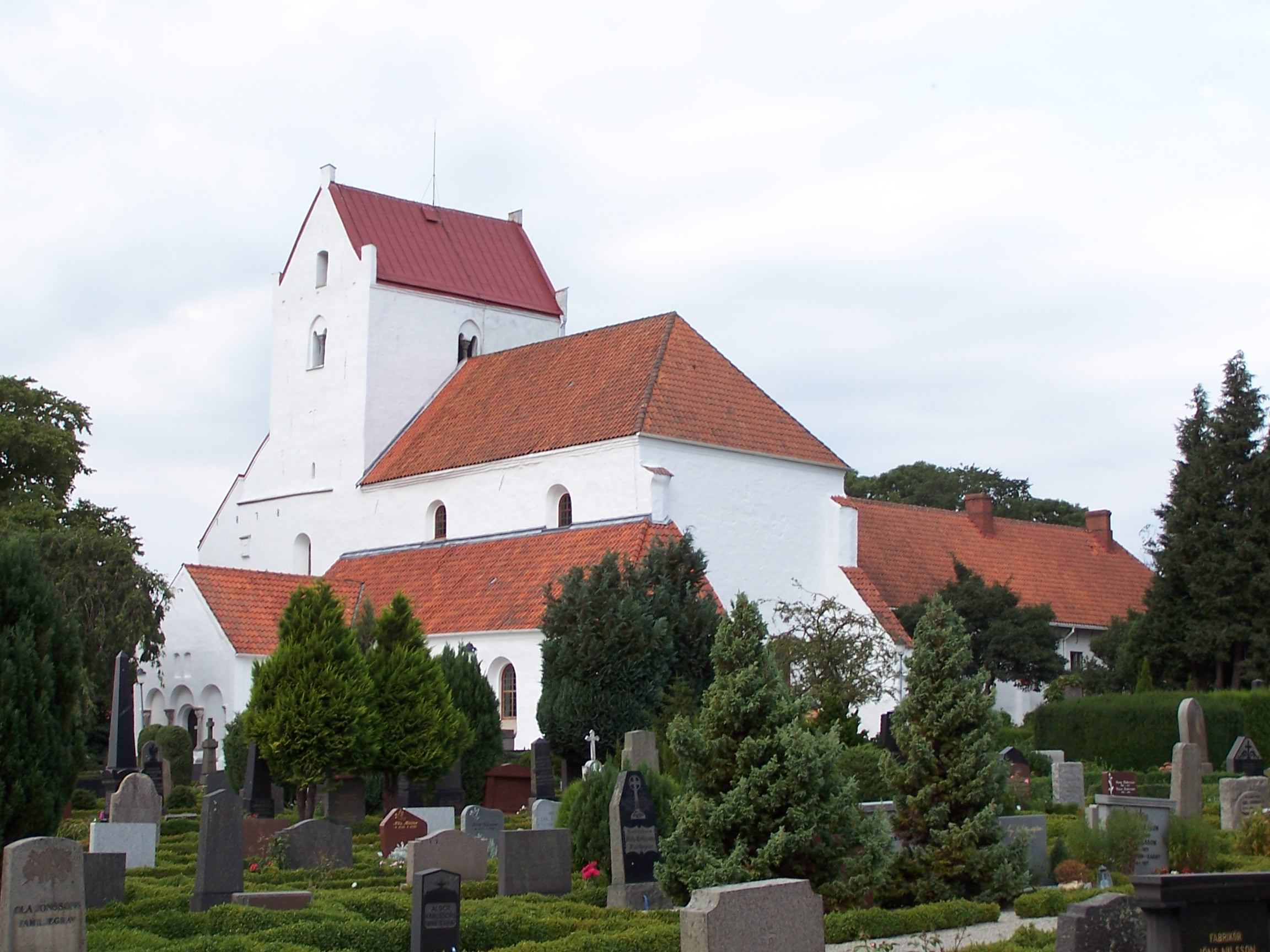
The Holy Cross Church in Dalby

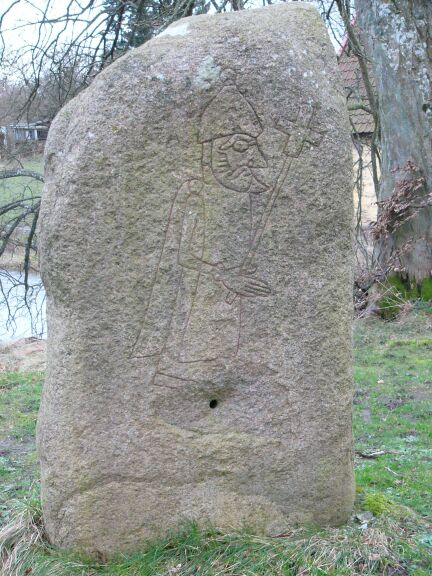
The Viking Age image stone Sövestad 1 from Skåne depicts a man carrying a cross.

Recorded missionary efforts in Denmark started with Willibrord, Apostle to the Frisians, who preached in Schleswig, which at the time was part of Denmark. He went north from Frisia sometime between 710 and 718 during the reign of King Ongendus. Willibrord and his companions had little success: the king was respectful but had no interest in changing his beliefs. Agantyr did permit 30 young men to return to Frisia with Willibrord. Perhaps Willibrord's intent was to educate them and recruit some of them to join his efforts to bring Christianity to the Danes. A century later Ebbo, Archbishop of Reims and Willerich, later Bishop of Bremen, baptized a few persons during their 823 visit to Denmark. He returned to Denmark twice to proselytize but without any recorded success.

In 826, the King of Jutland Harald Klak was forced to flee from Denmark by Horik I, Denmark's other king. Harald went to Emperor Louis I of Germany to seek help getting his lands in Jutland back. Louis I offered to make Harald Duke of Frisia if he would give up the old gods. Harald agreed, and his family and the 400 Danes with him were baptized in Ingelheim am Rhein. When Harald returned to Jutland, Emperor Louis and Ebbo of Rheims assigned the monk Ansgar to accompany Harald and oversee Christianity among the converts. When Harald Klak was forced from Denmark by King Horik I again, Ansgar left Denmark and focused his efforts on the Swedes. Ansgar traveled to Birka in 829 and established a small Christian community there. His most important convert was Herigar, described as a prefect of the town and a counselor to the king. In 831 the Archdiocese of Hamburg was founded and assigned responsibility for proselytizing Scandinavia.

Horik I sacked Hamburg in 845 where Ansgar had become the archbishop. The seat of the archdiocese was transferred to Bremen. In the same year there was a pagan uprising in Birka that resulted in the martyrdom of Nithard and forced the resident missionary Bishop Gautbert to flee. Ansgar returned to Birka in 854 and Denmark in 860 to reestablish some of the gains of his first visits. In Denmark he won over the trust of then-King Horik II (not Horik I, who was murdered in 854 and opposed Christianity) who gave him land in Hedeby (proto-town to be replaced by Schleswig) for the first Christian chapel. A second church was founded a few years later in Ribe on Denmark's west coast. Ribe was an important trading town, and as a result, southern Denmark was made a diocese in 948 with Ribe as its seat, a part of the Archdiocese of Hamburg-Bremen under its first bishop, St. Leofdag who was murdered that year while crossing the Ribe River.

The supremacy of the archdiocese of Hamburg-Bremen over ecclesiastical life in the north gradually declined as the papacy, from the pontificate of Pope Gregory VII onwards, involved itself more with the North directly. A significant step in this direction was the foundation of an archbishopric for the whole of Scandinavia at Lund in 1103–04.

== Scandinavian countries ==
=== Denmark ===
The spread of Christianity in Denmark occurred intermittently. Danes encountered Christians when they participated in Viking raids from the 9th century to the 1060s. Danes were still tribal in the sense that local chiefs determined attitudes towards Christianity and Christians for their clan and kinsmen. Bringing Christian slaves or future wives back from a Viking raid brought large numbers of ordinary Danes into close contact with Christians for perhaps the first time.

As the chiefs and kings of Denmark became involved in the politics of Normandy, England, Ireland, France, and Germany, they adopted a kinder attitude toward their Christian subjects. In some cases the conversion of the chief or king appears to be purely political to assure an alliance or prevent powerful Christian neighbours from attacking. There were instances when the conversion of a powerful chief (Danish: jarl) or one of the kings was followed by wholesale conversions among their followers. In a few instances conversion was brought about by trial by ordeal miracles wrought by saintly Christians in the presence of the king or other great men of the time.

Christian missionaries recognized early on that the Danes did not worship stone or wooden idols as the north Germans or some Swedes did. They could not simply destroy an image to prove that Christ was a superior god. The great religious sites at Viborg, Lejre, Lund, and Odense were also the location of Denmark's great assembly places (Danish: landsting). Religious sites in Denmark were often located at sacred springs, magnificent beech groves, or isolated hilltops. Missionaries simply asked to build chapels in those places. Over time the religious significance of the place transferred itself to the chapel.

Even after becoming Christian, Danes blended the two belief systems together. Families who lived close to the earth did not want to offend the local spirits (Danish: landvætter), so offerings were left just as they had been in pre-Christian times. Sacred springs (Danish: kilder) were simply consecrated to one of the local saints associated with the spring and life went on much as it had before. Likewise, Christian missionaries sited churches on or near sacred places, in some cases actually using wood from the sacred groves for church construction. Thor's hammer sign was easily absorbed by the cross.

Denmark has several saints, canonized by local bishops as was the custom in early Scandinavia or revered by locals as saints. Often these saints derive their veneration from deeds associated with the Christianization of Denmark. Viborg has St Kjeld, Aarhus has St Niels (also called St Nickolas), Odense has St Canute (Danish: Sanct Knud). Others include Canute Lavard, Ansgar, St Thøger of Vendsyssel, St Wilhelm, St Leofdag of Ribe, and others gave their lives and efforts to the task of making the Danes Christian.

King Gorm the Old (Danish: den Gamle), who was known in his lifetime as Gorm the Sleepy, was the first king of all of Denmark. Until his day, Danish kings were presumably local kings without influence over all the Danes. Denmark consisted of Jutland and Schleswig and Holstein all the way down to the Eider River, the main islands of Zealand, Funen, Langeland, the nearby lesser islands, and Skåneland. Gorm was said to be "hard and heathen", but Queen Thyra's influence permitted Christians to live more or less without trouble. The double barrow of Gorm and Thyra at Jelling contained a mixture of pagan and Christian iconography, including a decorated silver cup. Gorm and Queen Thyra's son, King Harald Bluetooth, boasted on one of the stones at Jelling that he had "made the Danes Christian". Harald Bluetooth is also mentioned in the inscription on the Curmsun Disc, dated AD 960s–980s. On the reverse of the disc there is an octagonal ridge, which runs around the edge of the object. In the center of the octagonal ridge there is a Latin cross which may indicate that Harald Bluetooth was Christian.

The first Danish king to convert to Christianity was Harald Klak, who had himself baptised during his exile in order to receive the support of Louis the Pious. Rimbert reports that he set out to return home, accompanied by missionaries; however, Sanmark regards it as "unlikely" that he actually returned home and thus considers his impact on the conversion of Denmark as "probably minor."

Christianity only gained a strong hold in Denmark following the baptism of Harald Bluetooth. Initially, Harald had remained pagan, although he had allowed public preaching by Christian missionaries as early as 935. Around 960, Bluetooth converted to Christianity, reportedly when the Frisian monk Poppo held a fire-heated lump of iron in his hand without injury. Harald's daughter, Gunhilde, and his son, Sweyn Forkbeard were baptized, too. There was also a political reason for conversion. German histories record Harald being baptized in the presence of Emperor Otto I, Sweyn Forkbeard's godfather. One consequence of his conversion is that Danish kings abandoned the old royal enclosure at Jelling and moved their residence to Roskilde on the island of Zealand.

Sweyn rebelled against his father, who spent an inordinate amount of time and money raising a great stone at Jelling to commemorate his accomplishments. One day King Harald asked a traveller if he had ever seen human beings move such a heavy load. "I have seen Sweyn drag all of Denmark away from you, sir. Judge for yourself which of you bears the heavier weight." Harald left the stone lying in the path, realizing at last that Sweyn had nearly succeeded in stealing the whole kingdom. Several battles brought the rebellion to stalemate, but in 985 Harald was wounded by an arrow and later died in Jomsborg.

Sweyn Forkbeard tried to wrest control of the church in Denmark away from the Holy Roman Empire and as a result was slandered by German historians of his day. He has been accused of relapsing from his Christian beliefs and persecuting Christians in England. In fact Sweyn gave land to the large cathedral at Lund to pay for the maintenance of the chapter. His army destroyed Christian churches in England as part of his invasion following the St. Brice's Day massacre of Danes organized by Aethelred. But when Sweyn became King of England and of Denmark, politics required that he show a kinder face toward the church which had opposed him.

Another Christianizing influence was the mass emigration of Danes to England and Normandy in the Viking years. Thousands of Danes settled in east central England and in northern France displacing or intermarrying with the locals who were Christian. Once part of a Danish clan became Christian, it often meant that the rest of the family's view toward Christianity softened.

By the early 11th century, certainly during the reign of Canute IV, Denmark can be said to be a Christian country. Later known as St. Canute, Canute IV was murdered inside St. Albans Church in 1086 after nobles and peasants alike rebelled at his enforcing the tithe to pay for the new monasteries and other ecclesiastical foundations which were introduced into Denmark for the first time during his reign. Both the institutions and the tax were considered foreign influences, and Canute's refusal to use the regional assemblies as was customary to establish new laws, resulted in his death and that of his brother, Prince Benedict, and seventeen other housecarls. In many ways the canonization of St. Canute in 1188 marks the triumph of Christianity in Denmark. When St. Canute's remains were moved into Odense Cathedral, the entire nation humbled itself with a three-day fast. Although he was not the first Dane to be made a saint, it was the first time for a king, the symbol of a more or less united Denmark, was recognized as an example worthy of veneration by the faithful.

From that time until 1536 when Denmark became a Lutheran country under the King (or Queen) of Denmark as the titular head of the Danish National Church, (Danish: Folkekirke) the struggle between the power of the king and nobles and the church would define much of the course of Danish history.

=== Norway ===
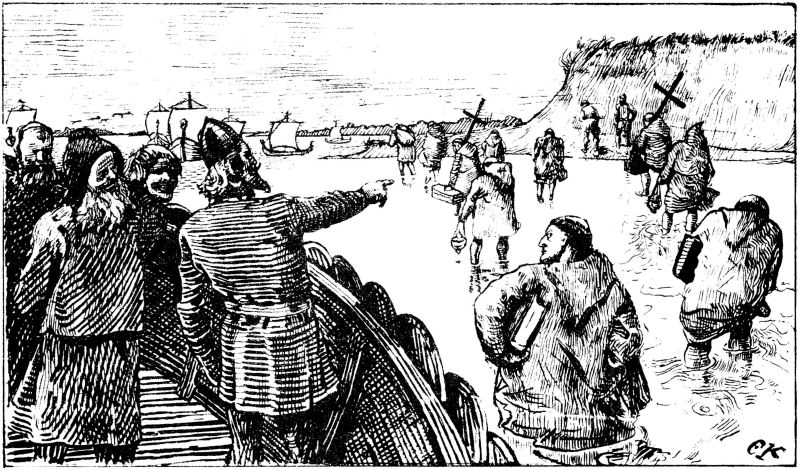
Haakon Jarl was given missionaries by the king of Denmark, but before departure, Haakon sent the missionaries back.

The first recorded attempts at spreading Christianity in Norway were made by King Haakon the Good in the tenth century, who was raised in England. His efforts were unpopular and were met with little success. The subsequent King Harald Greyhide, also a Christian, was known for destroying pagan temples but not for efforts to popularize Christianity.

He was followed by the staunchly pagan Haakon Sigurdsson Jarl, who led a revival of paganism with the rebuilding of temples. When Harold I of Denmark attempted to force Christianity upon him around 975, Haakon broke his allegiance to Denmark. A Danish invasion force was defeated at the battle of Hjörungavágr in 986.

In 995 Olaf Tryggvason became King Olaf I of Norway. Olaf had raided various European cities and fought in several wars. In 986, however, he (supposedly) met a Christian seer on the Isles of Scilly. As the seer foretold, Olaf was attacked by a group of mutineers upon returning to his ships. As soon as he had recovered from his wounds, he let himself be baptized. He then stopped raiding Christian cities and lived in England and Ireland. In 995 he used an opportunity to return to Norway. When he arrived, Haakon Jarl was already facing a revolt, and Olaf Tryggvason could convince the rebels to accept him as their king. According to legend, Haakon Jarl was later betrayed and killed by his own slave, while he was hiding from the rebels in a pig sty.

Olaf I then made it his priority to convert the country to Christianity using all means at his disposal. Expanding his efforts to the Norse settlements in the west the kings' sagas credit him with Christianizing the Faroes, Orkney, Shetland, Iceland, and Greenland.

After Olaf's defeat at the Battle of Svolder in 1000 there was a partial return to paganism in Norway under the rule of the Jarls of Lade. In the following reign of Saint Olaf, pagan remnants were stamped out and Christianity entrenched.

Nicholas Breakspear, later Pope Adrian IV, visited Norway from 1152 to 1154. During his visit, he set out a church structure for Norway. The Papal bull confirming the establishment of a Norwegian archdiocese at Nidaros is dated 30 November 1154.

Thirteenth-century runic inscriptions from the merchant town of Bergen in Norway show little Christian influence, and one of them appeals to a Valkyrie.

=== Sweden ===
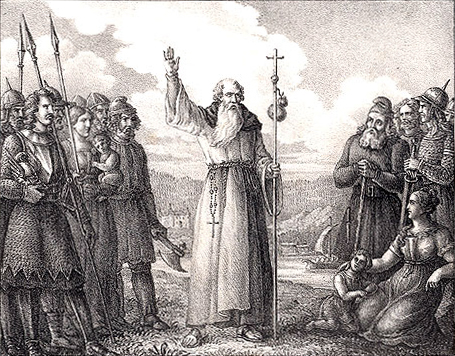
Ansgar made an unsuccessful attempt as early as in the 830s.

The first known attempts to Christianize Sweden were made by Ansgar in 830, invited by the Swedish king Björn. Setting up a church at Birka he met with little Swedish interest. A century later Unni, archbishop of Hamburg, made another unsuccessful attempt. In the 10th century English missionaries made inroads in Västergötland.

Newer archaeological research suggests there were Christians in Götaland already during the 9th century; it is further believed Christianity came from the southwest and moved towards the north.

The supporters of the cult at Uppsala drew a mutual agreement of toleration with Olof Skötkonung, the first Christian king of Sweden, who ascended to the throne in the 990s. Presumably Olof Skötkonung was not in a powerful enough position to violently enforce the observance of Christianity in Uppland. Instead he established an episcopal see at Skara in Västergötland, near his own stronghold at Husaby around 1000. Another episcopal see was established at Sigtuna in the 1060s by King Stenkil, according to Adam of Bremen. This seat was moved to Gamla Uppsala probably some time between 1134 and 1140. This might have been because of Uppsala's importance as an old royal residence and thing site, but it may also have been inspired by a desire to show that the resistance to Christianity in Uppland had been defeated. By papal initiative an archdiocese for Sweden was established at Uppsala in 1164.

What may be one of the most violent occurrences between Christians and pagans was a conflict between Blot-Sweyn and Inge the Elder in the 1080s. This account survives in the Orkneyinga saga and in the last chapter of Hervarar saga where the saga successively moves from legendary history to historic Swedish events during the centuries before its compilation. The reigning king Inge decided to end the traditional pagan sacrifices at Uppsala which caused a public counter-reaction. Inge was forced into exile, and his brother-in-law Blot-Sweyn was elected king on condition that he allow the sacrifices to continue. After three years in exile, Inge returned secretly to Sweden in 1087, and having arrived at Old Uppsala, he surrounded the hall of Blot-Sweyn with his húskarls and set the hall on fire, slaying the king as he escaped from the burning house. Hervarar saga reports that Inge completed the Christianization of the Swedes, but the Heimskringla suggests that Inge could not assume power directly, but had to dispose of yet another pagan king, Eric of Good Harvests.

According to M. G. Larsson, the reason why the Swedish core provinces had coexistence between paganism and Christianity throughout the 11th century was because there was a general support for the transition towards the new religion. However, the old pagan rites were important and central for legal processes and when someone questioned ancient practices, many newly Christianized Swedes could react strongly in support of paganism for a while. Larsson theorizes that, consequently, the vacillation between paganism and Christianity that is reported by the sagas and by Adam of Bremen was not very different from vacillations that appear in modern ideological shifts. It would have been impossible for King Inge the Elder to rule as a Christian king without strong support from his subjects, and a Norwegian invasion of Västergötland by Magnus Barefoot put Inge's relationship with his subjects to the test: he appears to have mustered most of the Swedish leidang, 3,600 men, and he ousted the Norwegian occupation force.

Although Sweden was officially Christianized by the 12th century, the Norwegian king Sigurd the Crusader undertook a crusade against Småland, the south-eastern part of the Swedish kingdom, in the early 12th century, and officially it was in order to convert the locals.

Archaeological excavations of burial sites on the island of Lovön near modern-day Stockholm have shown that the actual Christianization of the people was very slow and took at least 150 to 200 years.

=== Gotland ===
On the Swedish island of Gotland, a Gotlandic law book known as the Gutalagen was officially in use from the 1220s until 1595. In practice it remained in use until 1645. This law book stated that the performance of blóts was punishable by a fine.

=== Jämtland ===
On the northernmost runestone of the world standing on the island Frösön in central Jämtland, the Frösö Runestone, it is said that a man called Austmaðr Christianized the region, probably in the period 1030–1050 when the runestone was raised. Little is known of Austmaðr, but he is believed to have been the lawspeaker of the regional thing Jamtamót.

== Other Nordic countries ==
The Scandinavian medieval kings also ruled over provinces outside of Scandinavia. These provinces are today known as the Nordic countries.

=== Faroe Islands ===
Sigmundur Brestisson was the first Faroe-man to convert to the Christian faith, bringing Christianity to the Faroes at the decree of Olaf Tryggvason. Initially Sigmundur sought to convert the islanders by reading the decree to the Alting in Tórshavn but was nearly killed by the resulting angry mob. He then changed his tactics, went with armed men to the residence of the chieftain Tróndur í Gøtu and broke in his house by night. He offered him the choice between accepting Christianity or face beheading; he chose the former. Later on, in 1005, Tróndur í Gøtu attacked Sigmundur by night at his yard in Skúvoy, whereupon Sigmundur fled by swimming to Sandvík on Suðuroy. He reached land in Sigmundargjógv in Sandvík, but a farmer in the village killed the exhausted Sigmundur and stole his precious golden arm ring.

=== Finland ===
Judging by archaeological finds, Christianity gained a foothold in Finland during the 9th century. The Catholic church was strengthened with growing Swedish influence in the 12th century and the Finnish "crusade" of Birger Jarl in the 13th century. Finland was part of Sweden since then until the 19th century.

=== Iceland ===
Irish monks known as Papar are said to have been present in Iceland before its settlement by the Norse in the 9th century.

Following King Olaf I's taking of Icelandic hostages, there was tension between the Christian and pagan factions in 10th century Iceland. Violent clashes were avoided by the decision of the Althing in 1000 AD to put the arbitration between them to Þorgeir Ljósvetningagoði, the leader of the pagan faction. He opted, after a day and a night of meditation, that the country should convert to Christianity as a whole, while pagan worship in private would continue to be tolerated.

== Motives for conversion ==
Some conversions appear to have taken place for political and material gain, while others were for spiritual reasons. For instance, some may have simply wanted to take the rich gifts (such as a fine, white baptismal garment) that were being handed out by Frankish nobles, who acted as the baptismal candidates' sponsors, when they were baptized. In the case of King Harald Bluetooth of Denmark, for example, he only partially converted to the new faith (at least at first) to preserve his independence from the Germans, who posed an even greater threat at the time than the Franks had been prior to this. He also saw that Christianity had much to offer to his rule. It not only helped to exalt his status, but it also provided practical help. The Missionary bishops were literate, and those who had experience of the royal government in Germany or England had the potential to be valuable advisors. There was also an economic motive to convert as pagan kings were fascinated with Christian wealth. As a result, some chose to accept the new faith as a way to gain access to this wealth.

== Cultural impacts ==
As increasing numbers of Scandinavians converted to Christianity, syncretism became more apparent, and the lines between religion and culture became increasingly blurred. Many converted and sought to help the Catholic missionaries; in doing so they often used traditional means that were often associated with their religious past, leading to the integration of Christian and pagan cultural symbols throughout the years of conversion. For example, prior to the building of churches, converts sought to aid both their relatives and the work of the missionaries by erecting rune-stones. Originally associated with paganism, these later rune-stones, inscribed with Christian imagery, came to exemplify the flexibility that was required of both the native traditions and Christianity throughout mass conversion.

== Last pagans ==
In 1721, a new Danish–Norwegian colony was started in Greenland with the objective of converting the inhabitants to Christianity. Around the same time efforts were made in Norway and Sweden to convert the Sámi, who had remained pagan long after the conversion of their neighbours. Some Sámi remained unconverted until the 18th century.

== Aftermath ==
A 2009 research article by Phil Zuckerman showed that Scandinavian countries such as Denmark and Sweden were among the least religious nations in the world; nevertheless, "many Danes and Swedes, for instance, will profess belief in 'something,' although not necessarily the God of the Bible." According to Zuckerman, historical developments of culture and religion in Denmark and Sweden were crucially informing factors in explaining the state of irreligiosity. Zuckerman estimated that Sweden, Norway, Finland and Denmark had up to 18 million atheists or agnostics.

== See also ==
- Christianisation of the Germanic peoples
- Christianization of Kievan Rus'
- Christianization of Lithuania
- Heimskringla – A mediaeval work that relates the lives of the two Norwegian missionary kings
- Northern Crusades
- Birka and Hovgården
