= Hiddensee treasure =

Hoard of Viking gold found in 1873

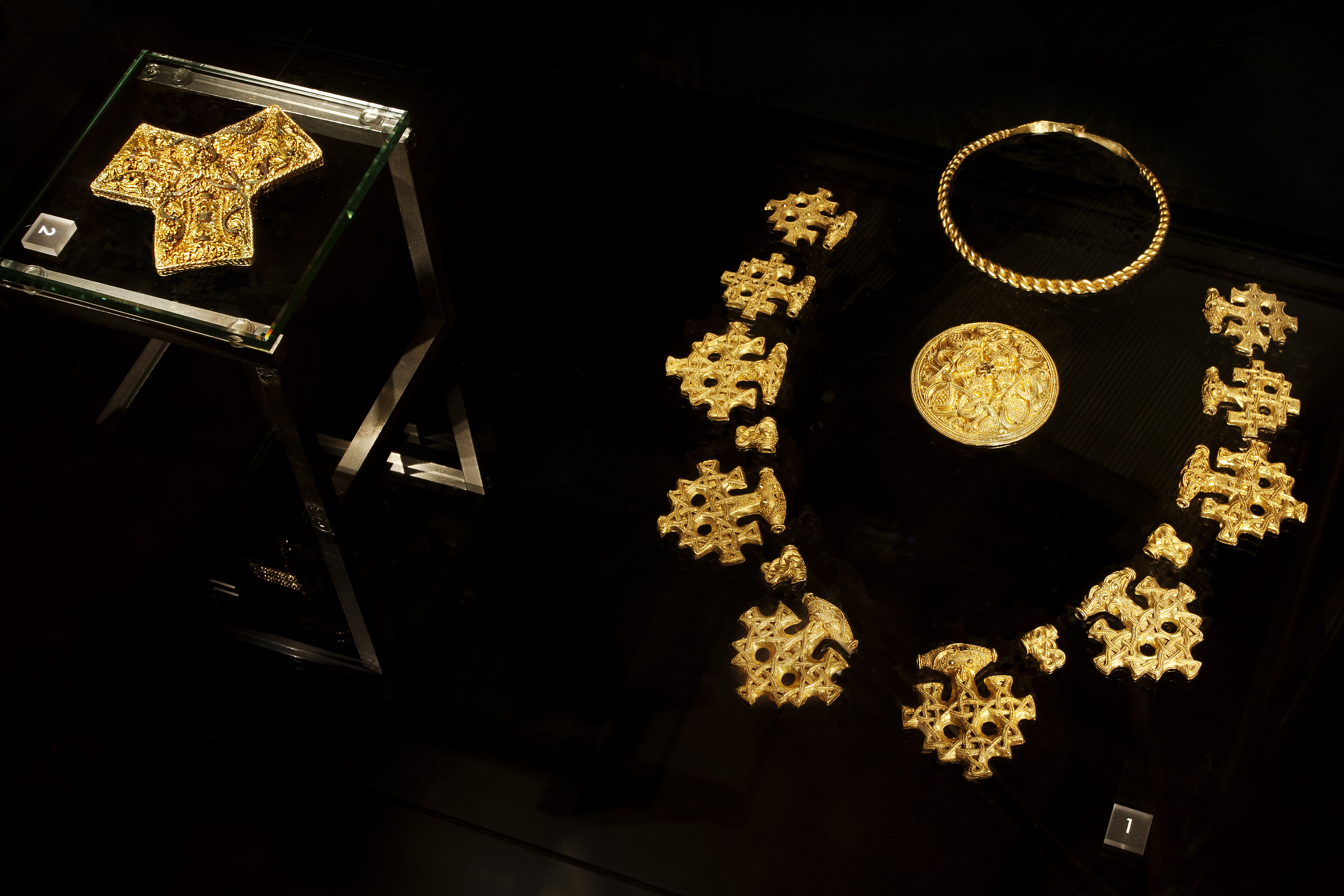
The Hiddensee treasure

The Hiddensee treasure is a hoard of Viking gold artifacts found in 1873 on the German island of Hiddensee in the Baltic Sea by chance, during rebuilding after significant flooding in 1872 and 1873.

== Description and dating ==
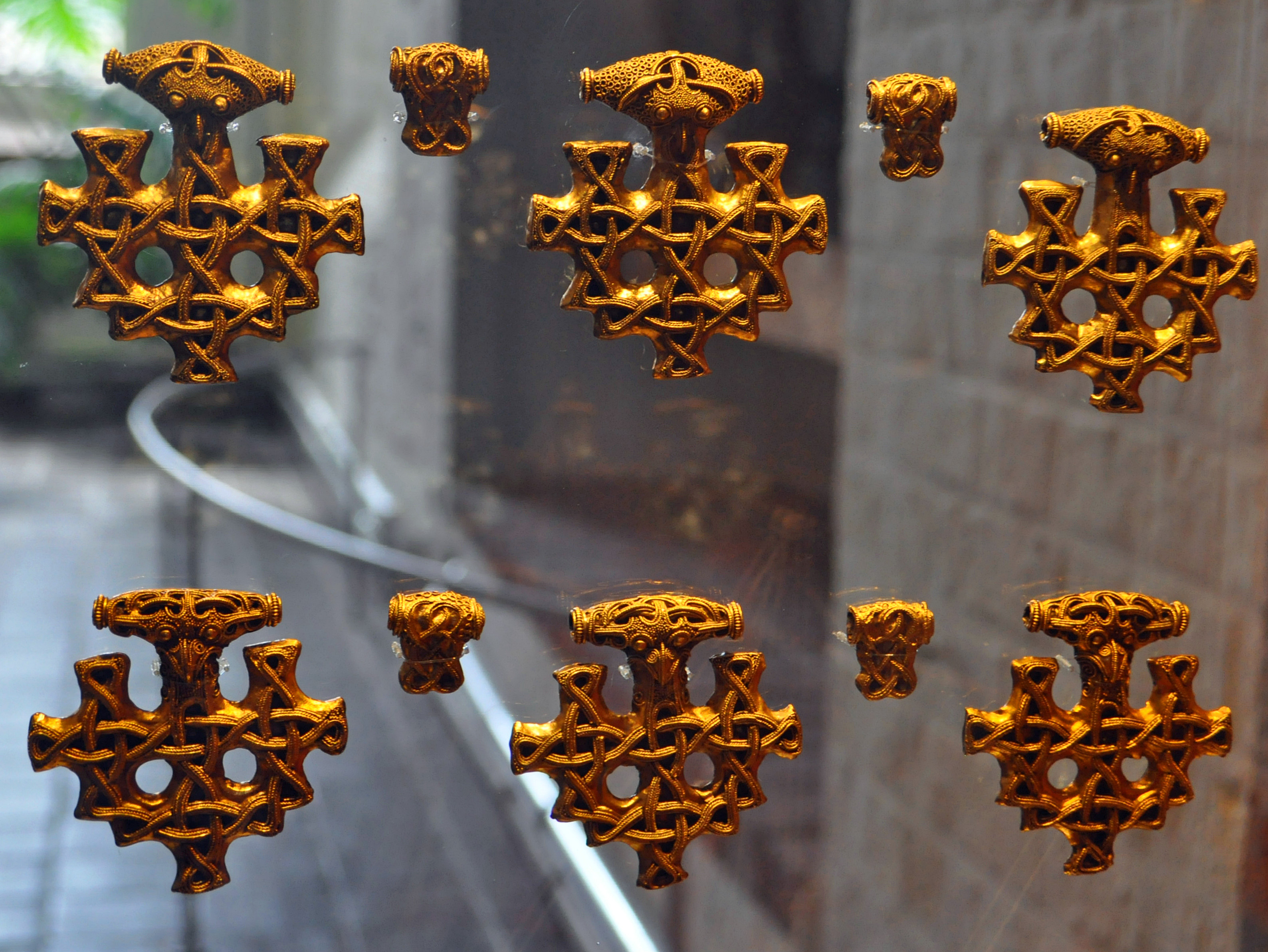
Closeup of some pendants.

The treasure consists of 16 pendants, a brooch, and a neck ring, all of gold weighing a total of 600 grams (1.3 lb). It is the largest discovery of Viking gold artifacts in Germany.

The jewelry dates from the late Viking Age, c. 10th century. The pendants include both Norse pagan and Christian symbols – Thor's hammer of Mjölnir and the cross. It is possible that the jewelry originally belonged to the family of the Danish King Harald Bluetooth.

== Exhibition ==
A replica of the Hiddensee treasure can be seen today in the Hiddensee Local History Museum. The original is kept in the Stralsund Museum of Cultural History

== See also ==
- Viking art
- Curmsun Disc
