= John Horneburg =

John Horneburg (1860-1951) was a German-American antiquities dealer.

== Life ==
John Ely Horneburg was born in New York on August 5, 1860. His parents were Lasse Philipp Horneburg and Sophie Horneburg, née Selke. His father, originally from Hamburg, moved the family back to Germany when John Horneburg was still a child. Horneburg became an upholsterer and paperhanger. From 1884, he worked as a photographer in Bergen on Rügen and had a photography business in Göhren. He was also active in the antiques trade and had contact with the provincial museum for Neuvorpommern and Rügen. In 1888 he married Karoline Mars (1864-1947). From 1918, the family lived in Stralsund, where John Horneburg ran an antiques store in Semlower Straße. He bought a house in Mühlenstraße. The couple had ten children A30; like their mother Karoline Horneburg, they were also baptized Protestant.

== Nazi era ==
When Hitler came to power in Germany in 1933, Horneburg was persecuted under Nazi racial laws because of his Jewish heritage. He was forced to give up his business in 1938 due to the decree to eliminate Jews from German economic life and ultimately had to sell his two houses in Stralsund. John and Karoline Horneburg moved to Hamburg in March 1940; they returned after the war and lived in the house in Göhren until their deaths. John Ely Horneburg died on February 21, 1951.

In 2025, the Stralsund Museum decided to restitute an object that had been looted from him due to Nazi persecution.
