= Harald Bluetooth =

10th-century King of Denmark and Norway

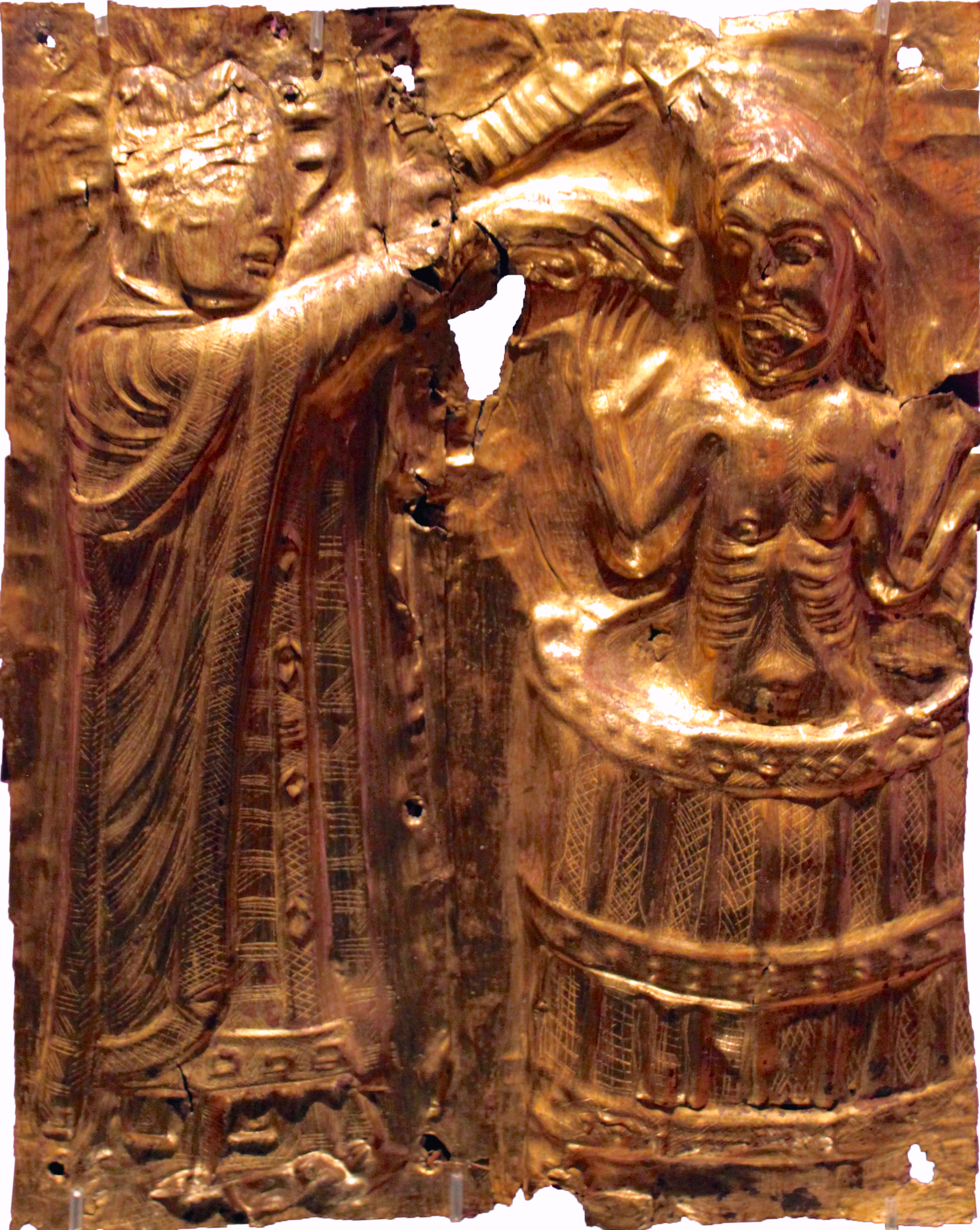
- Harald being baptized by Poppo the monk, in a relief dated to c. 1200

King of Denmark
- Reign: c. 958 – c. 986
- Predecessor: Gorm the Old
- Successor: Swein Forkbeard

King of Norway
- Reign: c. 970 – c. 985/986
- Predecessor: Harald Greycloak
- Successor: Olaf Tryggvason
- Regent: Haakon Sigurdsson (de facto ruler)
- Died: 985/986; Jomsborg
- Spouses: Tófa
- Issue Detail: Tyra; Swein Forkbeard; Haakon
- House: Gorm
- Father: Gorm the Old
- Mother: Thyra
- Religion: Christianity prev. Norse paganism

Harald "Bluetooth" Gormsson (Old Norse: Haraldr Blátǫnn Gormsson; Danish: Harald Blåtand Gormsen, died c. 985/86) was a king of Denmark and Norway.

The son of King Gorm the Old and Thyra Dannebod, Harald ruled as king of Denmark from c. 958 – c. 986, introduced Christianity to Denmark and consolidated his rule over most of Jutland and Zealand. Harald's rule as king of Norway following the assassination of King Harald Greycloak of Norway was more tenuous, most likely lasting for no more than a few years in the 970s. His son Swein Forkbeard forcibly deposed him from his Danish throne shortly before his death.

== Name ==
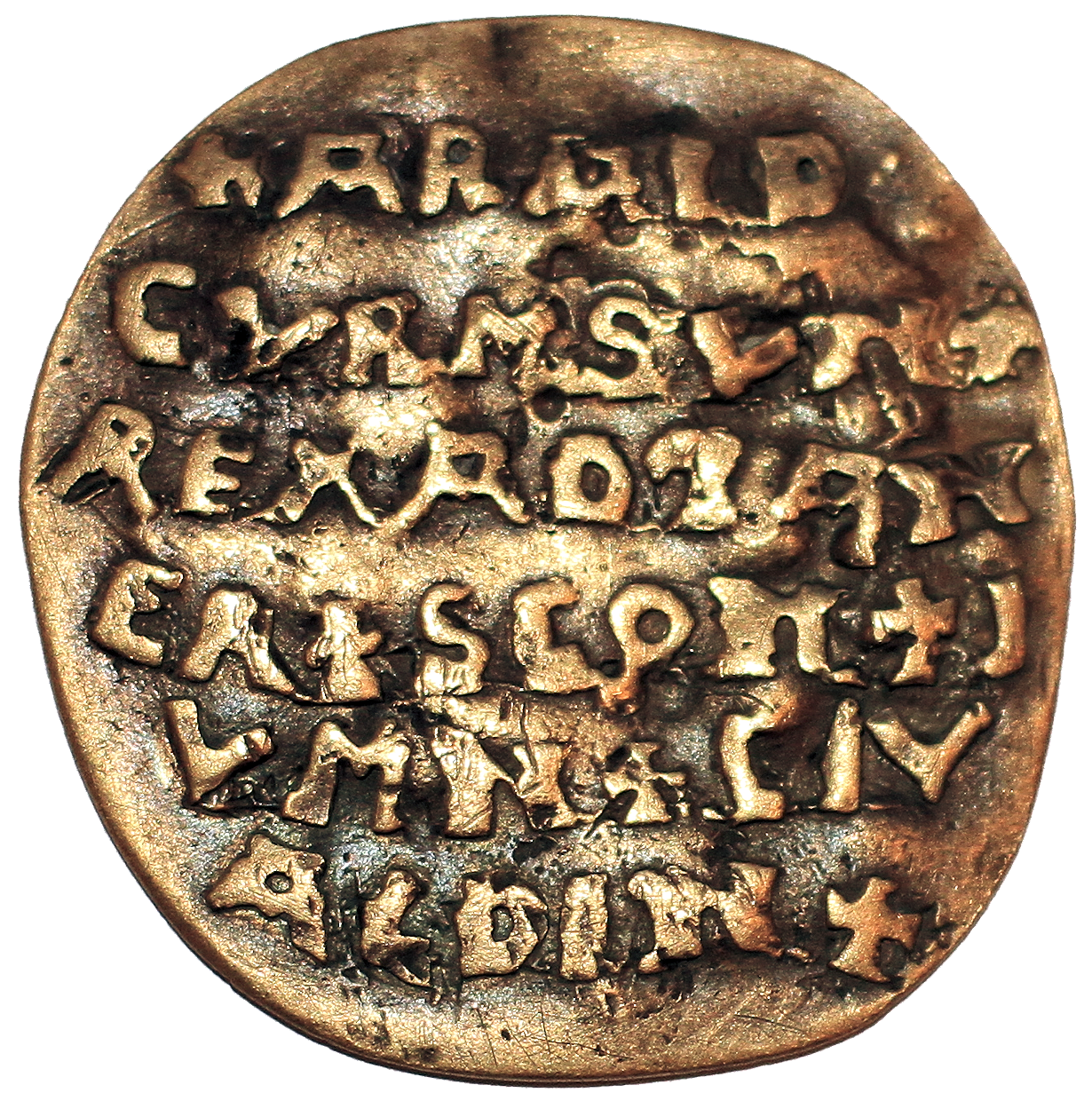
Curmsun disc with "Harald" inscription (Arald Curmsun) at the top lines

Harald's name is written as runic haraltr : kunukʀ (ᚼᛅᚱᛅᛚᛏᚱ ᛬ ᚴᚢᚾᚢᚴᛦ) in the Jelling stone inscription. In normalized Old Norse, this would correspond to Haraldr konungr, i.e. "Harald king". The Latinized name as given in the medieval Danish chronicles is Haraldus Gormonis filius (Harald, Gorm's son). The given name Haraldr (also Haralldr) is the equivalent of Old English Hereweald, Old High German Heriwald, from hari "army" and wald- "rule". Harald's name is also inscribed on the so-called Curmsun disc, rediscovered in 2014 (but part of a Viking hoard previously discovered in 1841 in the crypt of the Groß-Weckow village church in Pomerania, close to the Viking Age stronghold of Jomsborg), as +ARALD CVRMSVN + REX AD TANER + SCON + JVMN + CIV ALDIN, i.e. "Harald Gormson, king of Danes, Scania, Jumne, [in] Bishopric of Aldinburg".

The first documented appearance of Harald's nickname "Bluetooth" (as blatan; Old Norse *blátǫnn) is in the Chronicon Roskildense (written c. 1140), alongside the alternative nickname Clac Harald. Clac Harald appears to be a conflation of Harald Bluetooth with the legendary or semi-legendary Harald Klak, son of Halfdan. The byname is given as Blachtent and explicitly glossed as "bluish or black tooth" (dens lividus vel niger) in a chronicle of the late 12th century, Wilhelmi abbatis regum Danorum genealogia. The traditional explanation is that Harald must have had a conspicuous bad tooth that appeared "blue" (i.e. "black", as blár "blue" meant "blue-black", or "dark-coloured"). Another explanation, proposed by Scocozza (1997), is that he was called "blue thane" (or "dark thane") in England (with Anglo-Saxon thegn corrupted to tan when the name came back into Old Norse).

== Reign ==
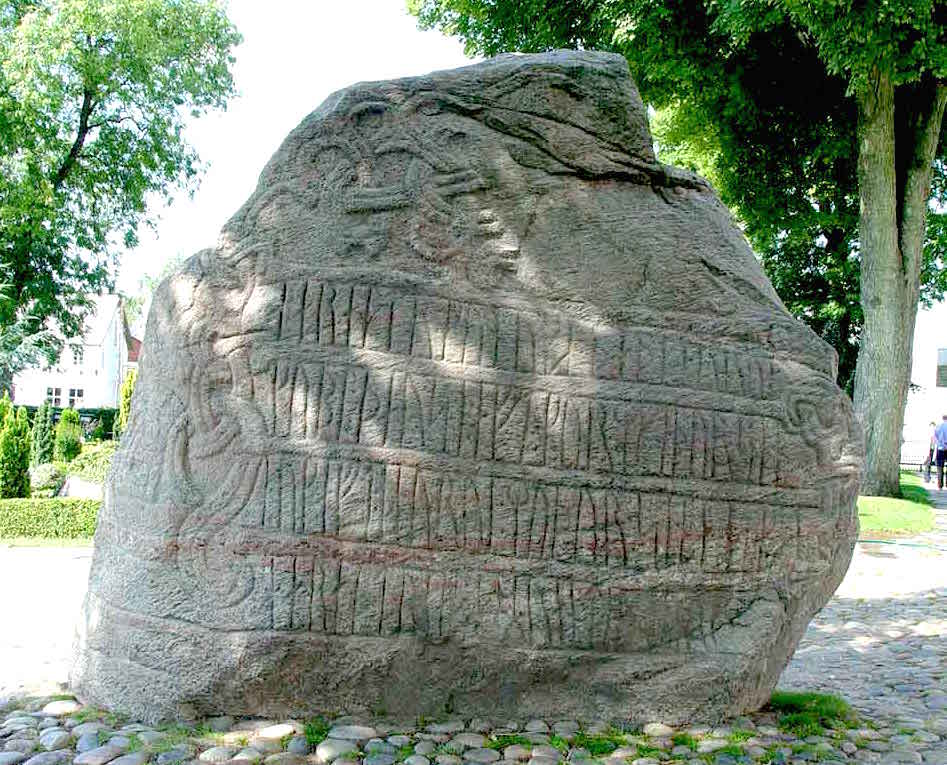
The larger Jelling stone, erected by Harald

Around 965, Harald erected the larger of the Jelling stones in memory of his parents, Gorm and Thyra. Its inscription credits Harald with unifying Denmark and converting the Danes to Christianity.

Harald was responsible for several large-scale construction projects, including roads, bridges, the expansion of the Danevirke, and a network of ring fortresses. The five surviving ring fortresses at Aggersborg, Fyrkat, Nonnebakken, Trelleborg and Borgring were constructed between about 970 and 980. They shared a uniform geometric design, with circular ramparts, four gateways positioned near the cardinal directions, and, in most cases, streets and longhouses arranged symmetrically within the enclosure. Archaeological research has interpreted the fortresses as evidence of Harald's ability to mobilize substantial manpower and resources and to exercise control over strategically important routes and regions.

Another major project was the Ravning Bridge at Ravning Enge, about 10 kilometres (6.2 mi) south of Jelling. Constructed around 979–980, the bridge was approximately 760 metres (2,490 ft) long and 5 metres (16 ft) wide. Its construction required about 1,200 oak posts and 600 cross-braces.

Toward the end of Harald's reign, his son Sweyn Forkbeard rebelled against him and seized power by force. Harald probably died soon afterwards from wounds sustained during the conflict.

=== Harald's Rebellion ===
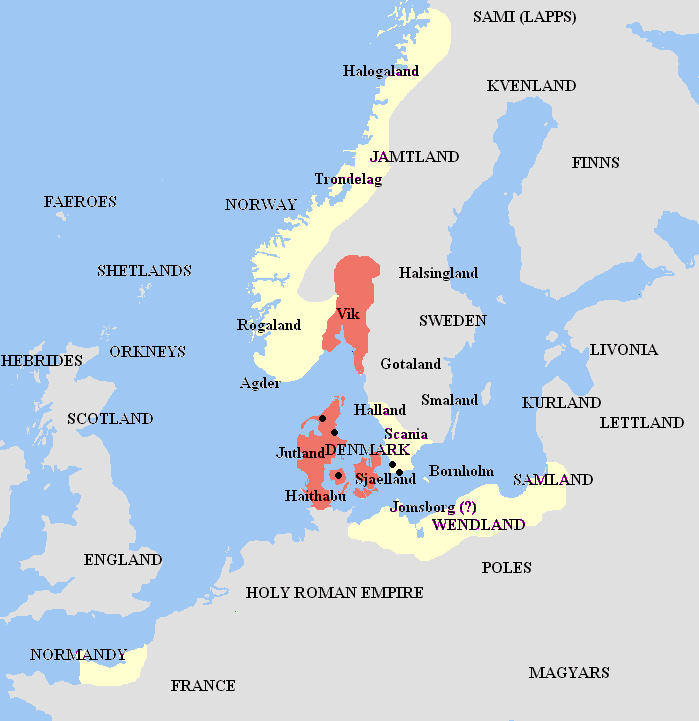
Harald's kingdom (in red) and his vassals and allies (in yellow) (Note: As set forth in Heimskringla, Knytlinga Saga, and other medieval Scandinavian sources.)

In the wake of Otto I's death, Harald attacked Saxony in 973. Otto II counter-attacked Harald in 974, conquering Haithabu, Dannevirke and possibly large parts of Jutland. Harald regained some of the seized territory in 983 when Otto II was defeated by the Saracens.

As a consequence of Harald's army having lost to the Germans at the Danevirke in 974, he no longer had control of Norway, and Germans settled back into the border area between Scandinavia and Germany. They were driven out of Denmark in 983 by an alliance of Obodrite soldiers and troops loyal to Harald, but soon after, Harald was deposed by a rebellion led by his son Swein and died shortly afterwards. He is believed to have died in 986, although several accounts claim 985 as his year of death. According to Adam of Bremen he died in Jumne/Jomsborg from his wounds. His body was brought back to the Trinity Church in Roskilde where he was buried.

The Curmsun Disc, found in Groß-Weckow, Pomerania, (after 1945 Wiejkowo) is inscribed with "ARALD CVRMSVN" (Harald Gormson), calling him, in abbreviated Latin, "king of Danes, Scania, Jomsborg, town of Aldinburg". Based on this, Swedish archaeologist Sven Rosborn has proposed that Harald is buried at the church there, close to Jomsborg, in what is now Poland.

From 1835 to 1977, it was wrongly believed that Harald ordered the death of the Haraldskær Woman, a bog body previously thought to be Gunnhild, Mother of Kings until radiocarbon dating proved otherwise.

The Hiddensee treasure, a large trove of gold objects, was found in 1873 on the German island of Hiddensee in the Baltic Sea. It is believed that these objects belonged to Harald's family.

Harald introduced the first nationwide coinage in Denmark.

== Conversion to Christianity ==
King Harald's conversion to Christianity is a contested bit of history, not least because medieval writers such as Widukind of Corvey and Adam of Bremen give conflicting accounts of how it came about.

Widukind of Corvey, writing during the lives of King Harald and Otto I (ruled 962–973), claims that Harald was converted by a "cleric by the name of Poppa" who, when asked by Harald to prove his faith in Christ, carried a "great weight" of iron heated by a fire without being burned. According to 12th-century Danish historian Saxo Grammaticus in his work Gesta Danorum, Poppa performed his miracle for Harald's son Swein Forkbeard after Swein had second thoughts about his own baptism. Harald himself converted to Catholicism after a peace agreement with the Holy Roman Emperor (either Otto I or II).

Adam of Bremen, writing 100 years after King Harald's death in "History of the Archbishops of Hamburg-Bremen", finished in 1076, describes Harald being forcibly converted by Otto I, after a defeat in battle. However, Widukind does not mention such an event in his contemporary Res gestae saxonicae sive annalium libri tres or Deeds of the Saxons. Some 250 years after the event, the Heimskringla relates that Harald was converted with Earl Haakon, by Otto II (ruled 973–983).

A cleric named Poppo or Poppa, perhaps the same one, also appears in Adam of Bremen's history, but in connection with Eric of Sweden, who had supposedly conquered Denmark (the fact that Eric conquered Denmark during the realm of Swein Forkbeard is explained by Saxo as a punishment for Swein's apostasy). The story of this otherwise unknown Poppo or Poppa's miracle and baptism of Harald is also depicted on the gilded altar piece in the Church of Tamdrup in Denmark (see image at top of this article). The altar itself dates to about 1200. Adam of Bremen's claim regarding Otto I and Harald appears to have been inspired by an attempt to manufacture a historical reason for the archbishops of Hamburg-Bremen to claim jurisdiction over Denmark (and thus the rest of Scandinavia); in the 1070s, the Danish king was in Rome asking for Denmark to have its own arch-bishop, and Adam's account of Harald's supposed conversion (and baptism of both him and his "little son" Swein, with Otto serving as Swein's godfather) is followed by the unambiguous claim that "At that time Denmark on this side of the sea, which is called Jutland by the inhabitants, was divided into three dioceses and subjected to the bishopric of Hamburg."

As noted above, Harald's father, Gorm the Old, had died in 958, and had been buried in a mound with many goods, after the pagan practice. The mound itself was from c. 500 BCE, but Harald had it built higher over his father's grave, and added a second mound to the south. Mound-building was a newly revived custom in the 10th century, perceivably as an "appeal to old traditions in the face of Christian customs spreading from Denmark's southern neighbors, the Germans".

After his conversion, around the 960s, Harald had his father's body reburied in the church next to the now empty mound. He had the Jelling stones erected to honour his parents. The biography of Harald Bluetooth is summed up by this runic inscription from the Jelling stones:

King Harald bade these memorials to be made after Gorm, his father, and Thyra, his mother. The Harald who won the whole of Denmark and Norway and turned the Danes to Christianity.

Harald undoubtedly professed Christianity at that time and contributed to its growth, but with limited success in Denmark and Norway.

== Marriages and children ==
=== Spouse ===
Harald's wife was Slavic and she is named on the Sønder Vissing Runestone inscription as Tófa.

=== Children ===
- Tyra of Denmark, allegedly married Styrbjörn the Strong.
- Swein Forkbeard.
- Gunhilde. According to the twelfth-century historian William of Malmesbury, Swein's sister Gunhilde and her husband Pallig were killed in the St. Brice's Day massacre ordered by King Æthelred the Unready in November 1002. However, William is the only source for Guhilde's existence and Pallig deserted England before the massacre. The historian Ann Williams thinks that Gunhilde did not exist.

== Bluetooth technology ==
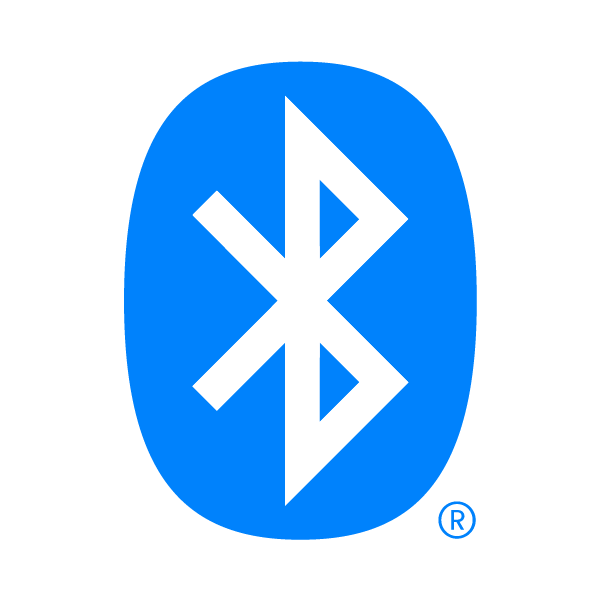
Bluetooth logo

The Bluetooth wireless specification design was named after Harald in 1997, based on an analogy that the technology would unite devices the way he united the tribes of Denmark into a single kingdom. The Bluetooth logo consists of a Younger Futhark bind rune for his initials, H (ᚼ) and B (ᛒ).

== See also ==
- Hagrold, a 10th-century Danish Viking in Normandy, mentioned as a Danish king, who became conflated with Harald Bluetooth in a later historical account.

== Footnotes ==
Regnal titles
Preceded by Gorm the Old	King of Denmark; 958–985/986	Succeeded by Swein Forkbeard
Preceded by Harald Greycloak	King of Norway; 970–985/986	Succeeded by Swein Forkbeard
