= Wiejkowo =

- Village
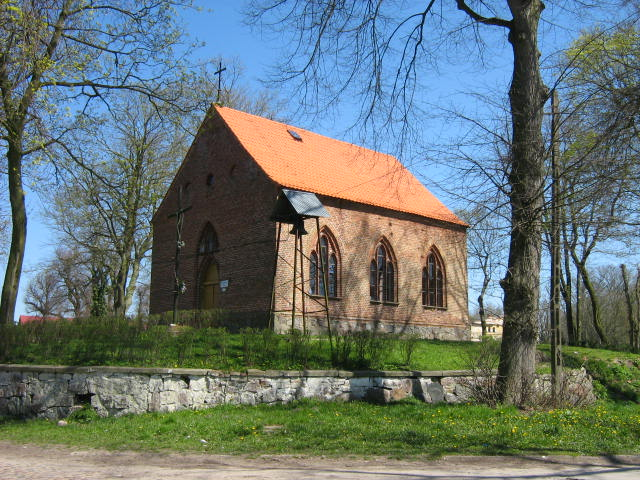
- Immaculate Conception of Blessed Virgin Mary church in Wiejkowo

- Location within Poland
- Coordinates: 53°49′N 14°41′E
- Country: Poland
- Voivodeship: West Pomeranian
- County: Kamień
- Gmina: Wolin
- Population: 300
- Time zone: UTC+1 (CET)
  - Summer (DST): UTC+2 (CEST)
- Vehicle registration: ZKA

Wiejkowo [vjɛi̯ˈkɔvɔ], until 1945 named (in German) Groß Weckow, is a village in the administrative district of Gmina Wolin, within Kamień County, West Pomeranian Voivodeship, in north-western Poland. It lies approximately 6 km (4 mi) south-east of Wolin, 19 km (12 mi) south of Kamień Pomorski, and 45 km (28 mi) north of the regional capital Szczecin. It is situated on the western shore of Ostrowo Lake in the historic region of Pomerania.

The village has a population of 300.

== History ==
The territory became part of the emerging Polish state under its first ruler Mieszko I around 967. Following the fragmentation of Poland, it formed part of the Duchy of Pomerania (which since 1181 became part of the Holy Roman Empire). German-Danish von Guentersberg family governed Weckow since 1299 until they died out in 1763; then the von Berg family received the village. Alexandrine von Berg inherited Weckow from her father and with her marriage to Albert von Ploetz, the village was in the possession of the von Ploetz family until 1945.

Under the terms of the Potsdam Agreement, the region became again part of Poland after World War II, and Poles expelled from Soviet-occupied eastern Poland were resettled in the region.

== The Curmsun disc ==
The Curmsun disc was reportedly to be part of a Viking treasure in a grave discovered in the ruins of an earlier church when the current church was being built. Along with other objects, the gold treasure was partly recovered in 1841 and the rest in 1945. It then ended up with a Polish family Sielski, but was then dispersed in the post-war period, except for a few individual objects. These, together with a number of documents related to the find that the then priest had collected, as well as documents from the Second World War and letters within the family, accompanied us when we moved to Sweden in 1988. The disc remained unknown until 2014 when eleven-year-old Maja Sielska showed it to her history teacher and it was subsequently rewritten.
