= Curmsun Disc =

Convex-concave gold disc

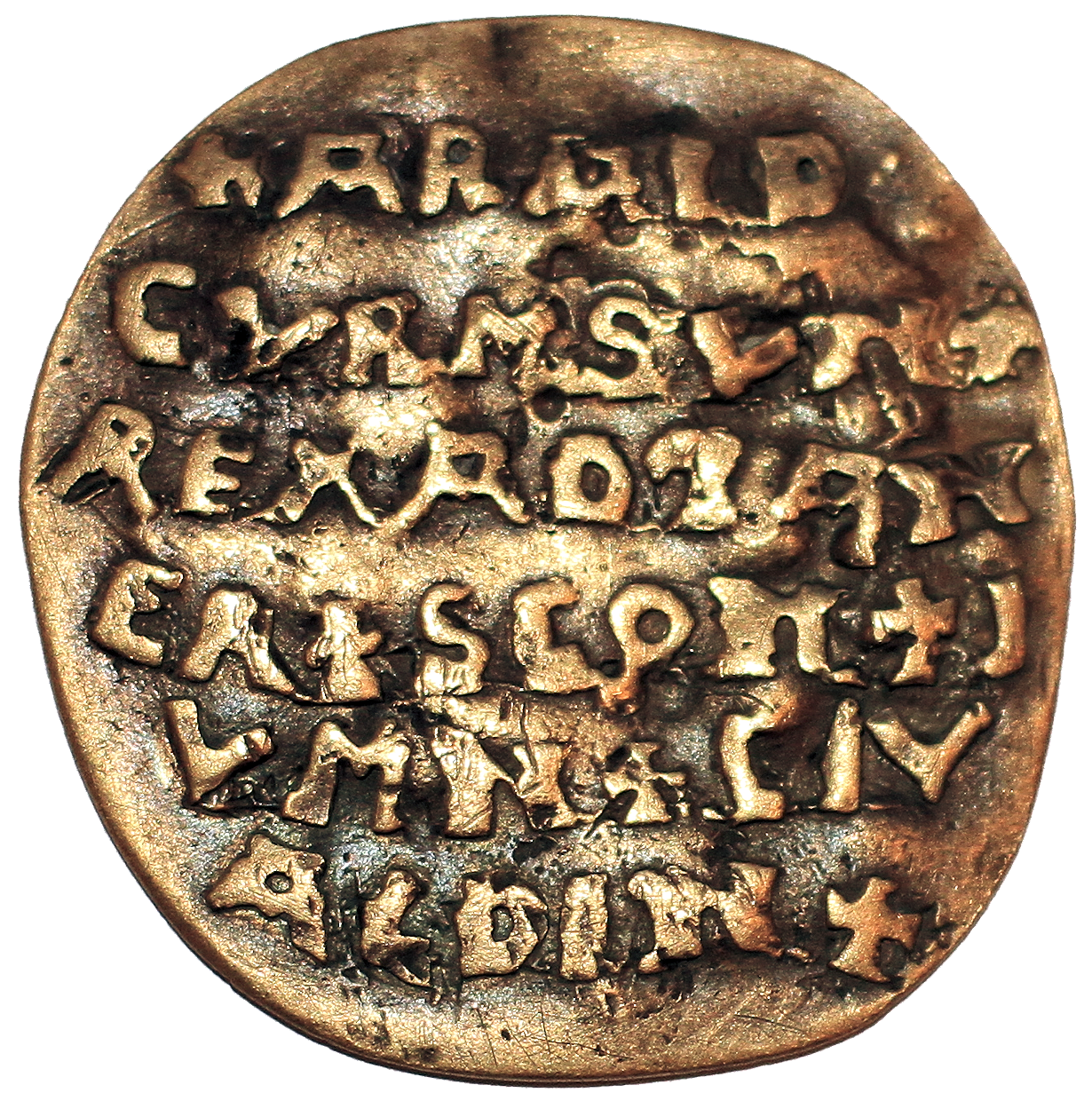
Obverse

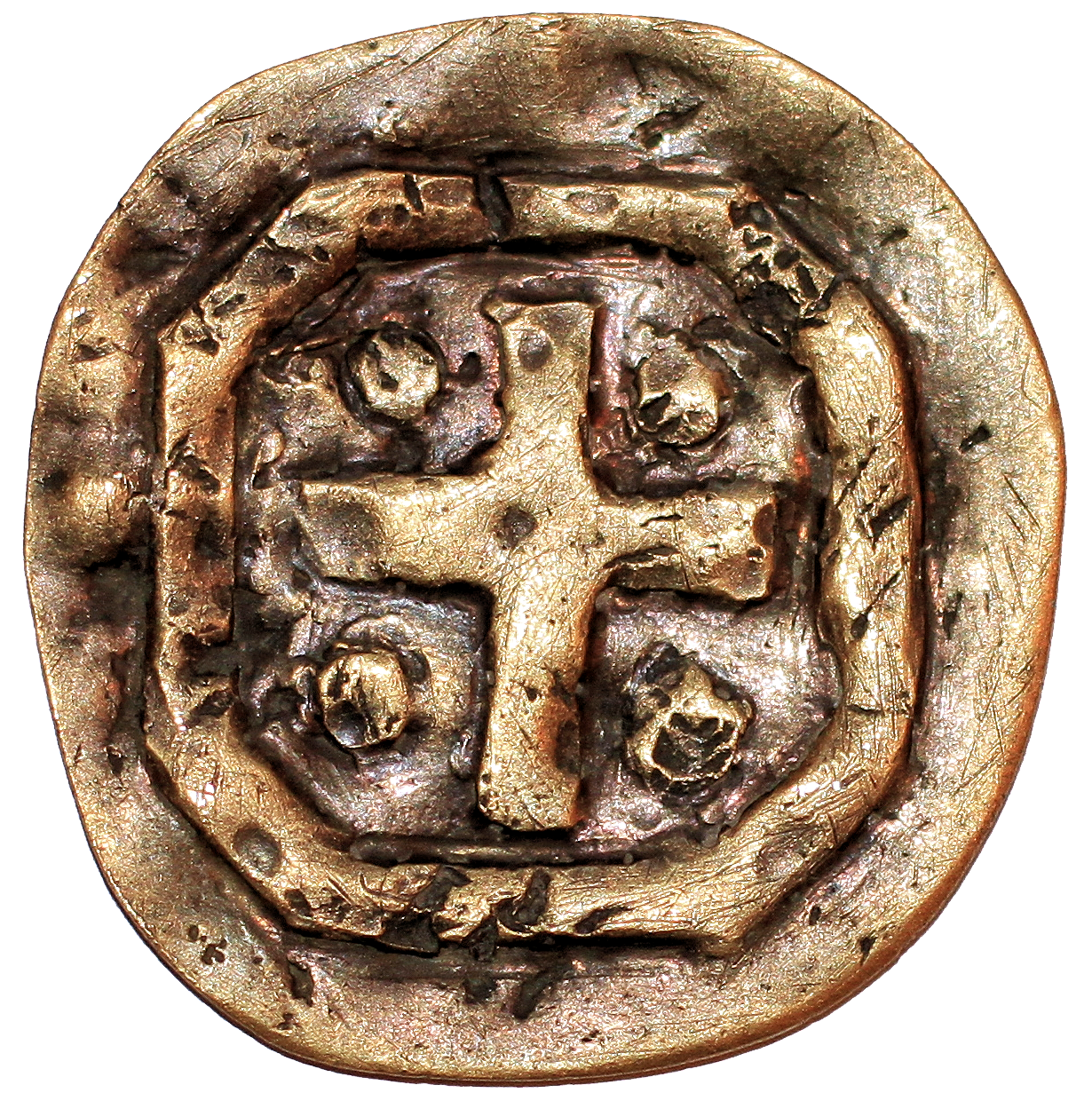
Reverse

The Curmsun Disc is a gold disc bearing a Latin inscription naming the Danish king Harald Bluetooth. It attracted public attention in Sweden in 2014 and is reported to have originated from a find at Wiejkowo, in present-day Poland. Its inscription and possible connection to Harald have prompted discussion of its age and purpose. A majority of scholars in the field have questioned the dating or provenance of the disc or have called it a forgery.

== Origin ==
The Curmsun disc was reportedly found as part of a Viking Age hoard discovered in 1841 in the cellar crypt of the ruined church in the village of Groß Weckow (now called Wiejkowo) in Pomerania in Prussia (now part of Gmina Wolin, Poland). This location is just east of the bank of the river Dziwna and near the place where the semi-legendary Viking stronghold of Jomsborg stood between the 950s and 1043.

According to Swedish archaeologist Sven Rosborn, the entrance to the crypt was accidentally discovered by a 12-year-old Heinrich Boldt, who was playing with some younger children at a construction site near the ruined chapel.

The find consists of five objects: a silver coin from Otto I's reign, a bracelet in bronze with a dash decoration covering the surface, a fragment of another bronze bracelet, a small, stamped piece of gold and the Curmsun Disc itself.

After its original discovery the hoard was left in the crypt until 1945, when an officer in the Polish Wojska Lądowe (Land Forces), Major Stefan Sielski, and his brother, Michał, entered and seized what was left of it. The disc did not appear to be made of gold so it was placed in a box with old buttons. In 2014, Michał Sielski's 11-year-old great-granddaughter showed the disc to her history teacher and it was reported in the press on 5 December 2014.

== Translation ==
Researchers have interpreted the inscription on the obverse as: "+ARALD CVRMSVN+ REX AD TANER+SCON+JVMN+CIV ALDIN+".

CVRMSVN is a transliteration from spoken Old Norse via runes into the Medieval Latin alphabet.

- Old Norse word in Latin alphabet: *Gormsson
- Written in runes (Younger Futhark): *ᚴᚢᚱᛘᛋᚢᚾ
- Transliterated to Latin alphabet: CVRMSVN

The same phenomenon could be seen in some coins from York in the tenth century where king (Old Norse konungr) is transliterated as CVNVNC. Old Norse in coin inscriptions ended after the tenth century.

A full translation of the inscription reads: "Harald Gormson king of Danes, Scania, Jomsborg, town (or bishopric) Aldinburg (Oldenburg in Holstein)".

On the reverse there is an octagonal ridge, which runs around the edge of the object. In the centre of the octagonal ridge there is a Latin cross. There are four dots around the Latin cross. Similar dot markings are common on coins, even on coins from the late 900s. The four dots could possibly symbolize the Four Evangelists, whose symbols in the Middle Ages had strong associations with the Christ symbolism of the cross.

== Analysis ==
=== Around 960s - Harald Bluetooth's second marriage ===
In 2014, Danish anthropologist Karen Schousboe suggested that, if authentic, the disc might date to between 963 and 975, or possibly after 986. She described the historical reconstruction as highly speculative. In a 2021 review of Sven Rosborn's book, Schousboe gave a favourable assessment of his interpretation of the disc and the associated discoveries.

=== Around 986 - Harald Bluetooth's death ===
According to research by Swedish archeologist Sven Rosborn, the Latin inscription on the obverse of the Curmsun Disc may have been created by a Frankish monk in connection with Harald Bluetooth's death around 986. Rosborn points out that Adam of Bremen, the only historical source commenting on the death of Harald, says that Harald died in Jumne (Jomsborg) from his wounds. Yet, as Rosborn explains, Jumne probably did not have a Christian church, so Harald's body may have been buried, at least temporarily, in the nearest church located at Wiejkowo. Thus, the disc may have been placed near the burial. Rosborn's findings have been challenged by Polish researcher Marek Kryda, who says that Harald Bluetooth is likely buried in a mound that he saw on Polish satellite imagery. He believes this to be a Viking "pagan mound" that the Wiejkowo church was later built over in the 19th century.

=== Around 1100 - Cult of Harald Bluetooth? ===
Danish archivist Steffen Harpsøe proposed that the disc might have been made between approximately 1050 and 1125, perhaps around 1100, by local priests seeking to establish a cult of Harald Bluetooth as a saint. He described this reconstruction as hypothetical, and the authenticity of the disc was open pending further investigation.

=== Questionable authenticity ===
According to historians Kurt Villads Jensen and Wojtek Jezierski, it is not possible to estimate the age of the disc. It also resembles no other known artefact from the Viking age. Kurt Villads Jensen argues further that it is impossible to precisely date gold objects; even if the alloy is accurate, it might come from a melted down Viking age artefact. The disc could therefore potentially have been created at any time. Several other Danish professors, including Jes Wienberg and Jens Ulriksen, are equally dubious of the authenticity of the Curmsun disc and the associated Gesta Wuleniensis, and are highly critical of Rosborn's arguments and use of historical sources. Wienberg stated that dating the disc is impossible in his review of Sven Rosborn's book, The Viking King's Golden Treasure, for the Jutland Archaeological Society journal Kuml.

Numismatist Mateusz Bogucki believes the disc is a counterfeit, likely made by "antiquity enthusiasts" in the 18th or 19th centuries. Archeologist Wojciech Filipowiak says that no publications (as of 2022) have proven the Curmsun disc to be genuine.

The Curmsun Disc was featured on the reality television series Expedition Unknown. Danish archaeologist Søren M. Sindbæk mentioned the disc but could only say that it may be related to Harald Bluetooth.

Kvällsstunden reported that experts at a natural history museum considered the disc a forgery. Swedish numismatist Lars O. Lagerqvist was quoted as saying that he had seen many counterfeits but nothing like the disc, and that he wouldn't call it a forgery.

== Metallurgical analysis ==
The Curmsun Disc underwent electron microscopic analysis at Lund University in Sweden. The analysis showed a non-homogeneous alloy with a gold content ranging between 83.3 and 92.8%. The surface and alloy showed characteristics typical for artefacts created during the latest part of the Early Middle Ages. No traces of modern processes or chemicals were discovered. Surface analysis by a gemologist, Jonny Westling, appointed by the Swedish Chamber of Commerce in Stockholm and Lloyd's/Brookfield Underwriting, showed natural inclusions and patination.

== Exhibition ==
The Curmsun disc is owned by an undisclosed company and deposited at a bank vault in Sweden. The disc's insured value is US$3.5 million, and the valuation has been performed by Jonny Westling, an expert appointed by Swedish Chamber of Commerce and Lloyds/Brookfield Underwriting.

== See also ==
- Christianization of Scandinavia
- Harald Bluetooth
- Hiddensee treasure
- Bornholm amulet
