= Altenburger =

Altenburger is a surname. Notable people with the surname include:

- Alfred Altenburger (1923–2008), Swiss speed skater
- Christian Altenburger (born 1957), Austrian classical violinist
- Fanny Altenburger (born 2000), Austrian actress
- Karl Altenburger (1909–1978), German racing cyclist
- Roland Altenburger (born 1948), Swiss rower

== See also ==
- Altenburger Land, district in Thuringia, Germany
