= Studenterhuset =

Listed building in Copenhagen

Students' House
- Studenterhuset
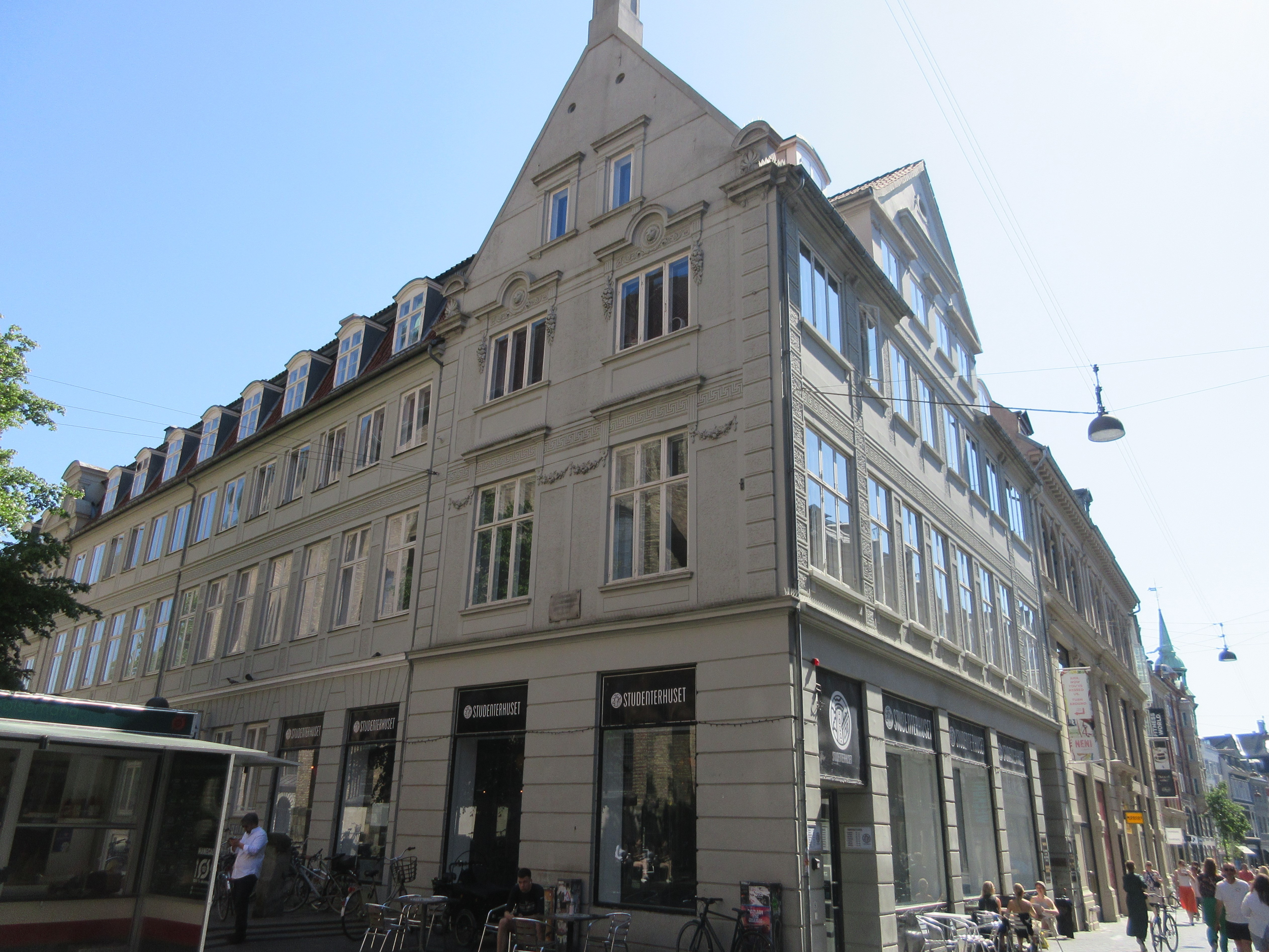
- Interactive map of the Students' House area

General information
- Location: Copenhagen, Denmark
- Coordinates: 55°40′43″N 12°34′28.5″E
- Completed: 1631

Studenterhuset (English; The Students' House), situated at the corner of Købmagergade (No. 52) and Trinitatis Kirkeplads, next to the Round Tower, is a meetingplace for students in Copenhagen, Denmark. Students at the University of Copenhagen are born members of Studenterhuset but it is also possible for students at other institutions of higher education to acquire membership. The building was constructed in the 1730s but owes its current appearance to successive renovations in the 19th century. The building was for more than one hundred years owned by brewers whose brewery was based in the courtyard. The building was listed on the Danish registry of protected buildings and places in 1945. A plaque commemorates that Studenterforeningen had its first home in rented premises in the building from November 1820 to 1824. Notable former residents include professor of medicine Christian Friis Rottbøll (1727-1797), naval officer Steen Andersen Bille, politician Christian Colbjørnsen, professor of philosophy Børge Riisbrigh (1731-1809) and naval officer Olfert Fischer.

== History ==
=== 17th century ===
The site was originally made up of two separate properties. One of them was listed in Copenhagen's first cadastre of 1689 as No. 1 in Rosenborg Quarter, owned by brewer Anders Børgesen. The other one was listed as No. 2 in Rosenborg Quarter and belonged to former turner Jens Christensen. forhenværende blokkedrejer.

=== 18th century ===
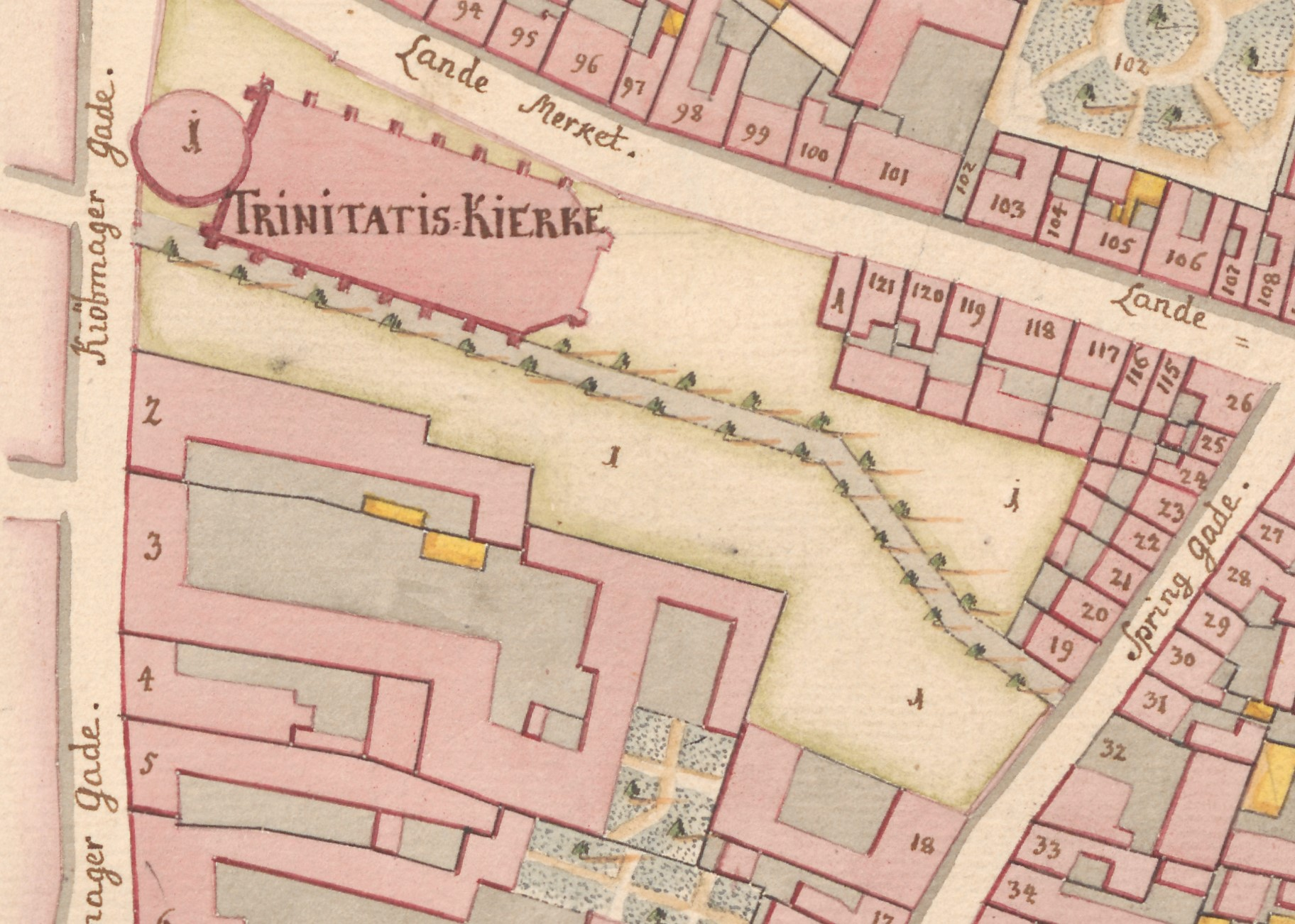
No. 2 seen on a detail from Gedde's map of Rosenborg Quarter, 1757

After the fire, the two properties were merged into a single property. The present building on the site was constructed in 1729-31 by master mason Ole Larsen and master carpenter Gabriel Sørensen for councilman Jens Lasen's widow. It was listed in the new cadastre of 1756 as No. 2 in Rosenborg Quarter. It belonged to Niels Pedersen at that time. Christian Friis Rottbøll (1727-1797), a professor of medicine, resided in one of the apartments from 1770 til 1775. N. E. Balle (1744-1816), a professor of theology and later bishop, was among the residents in 1773. Edvard Colbjørnsen (1744-1802), a professor of law, was a resident in the building from 1773 to 1776. Christian Colbjørnsen (1749-1814), a jurist and later politician, was also a resident in 1774. Børge Riisbrigh (1731-1809), a professor of philosophy, was a resident in 1782. The naval officer Olfert Fischer (1747-1829) was also a resident in 1782.

The property was home to 19 residents at the 1787 census. Johan Conrad Fribert, a brewer, resided in the building with a brewery worker (bryggersvend), an apprentice and a caretaker. Jacob Edvard Colbiørnsen, a Supreme Court judge, resided in the building with his son Jacob Edvard Colbiørnsen, one male servant and two maids. Caroline Kløecker (née Hoppe), widow of Herman Lengerken de Kløcker, resided in the building with her son Friderich Abraham Kløecker and daughter Maria Elisabeth Kløecker, two male servants and three maids. Just Bille (1744-) and Steen Andersen Bille (1751-), two naval officers were the last two residents of the building.

=== 1800–1840 ===
The property was home to 29 residents in three households at the 1801 census. Hendrich Jacobsen, a new brewer, resided in the building with his wife Frideriche Sophie Hvidt, a brewery worker, a brewer's apprentice, a caretaker, two maids and three lodgers. Caroline Kløcker resided in the building with two maids, a coachman, a caretaker, a male servant, two bookdealers, their servant and the lodger Friderich Harrer (artist). Peder Boy Wiborg, manager of the neighboring porcelain factory, resided in the building with his wife Dorothe Peschin, their six children (aged one to 10) and a wet nurse.

In the new cadastre of 1806, the property was again listed as No. 2 in Rosenborg Quarter.

The new Student's Union (Studenterforeningen) was based in rented premises on the ground floor of the building from November 1820. The association had been founded a few months earlier by seven students from Regensen on the other side of the street. In 1824, it relocated to new pewmises at Admiralgade 28.

=== 1840s ===
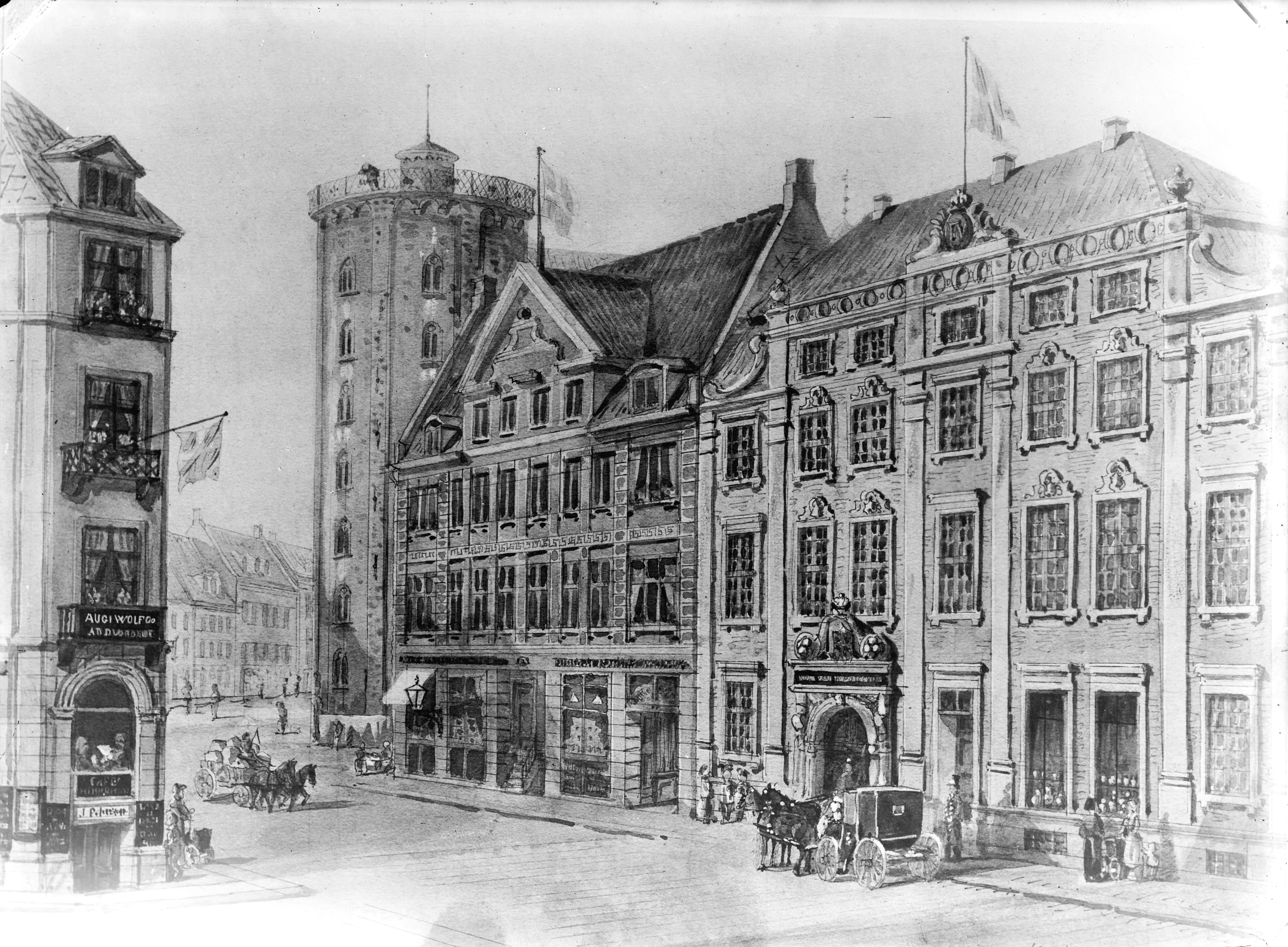
Rarlier appearance of the building, unknown date.

The property was home to 42 residents at the 1850 census. Carsten Carstensen, a new brewer, resided on the ground floor with his wife Henriette Emiliea Carstensen, their four children (aged one to 12), four male servants and three maids. Peter Thonning, a medical doctor and botanist, resided on the first floor with his wife Anna Maria Nicolina (née Kamphøffner, 1784-1860)m their three children (aged 21 to 28), one male servant and two maids. Johann Jürgen Jürgensen, inspector of St. Petri Girls' School, resided on the second floor with his wife Anne Cathrine Maria Jürgensen and one maid. Dorothea Friedericke Wilhelmine Nissen, a teacher at St. Petri's Girls' School, resided on the second floor with her two daughters (aged 14 and 17) and two lodgers. Johann Martin Thau, a teacher at St. Petri Girls' School, resided on the third floor with his wife Dorothea Magdalena Thau and one maid. Carl Christensen, a grocer (høker), resided in the basement to the right with one maid. Christine Nielsen, widow of a barkeeper, resided in the basement to the left with her 24-year-old daughter Amalie Nielsen. Anne Kirstine Lerche, a widow bookbinder, resided on the ground floor of the side wing with her daughter Caroline Wilhelmine Henriette Lerche, three bookbinders and one lodger.

Most of the residents were the same at the 1845 census.

=== Later history ===
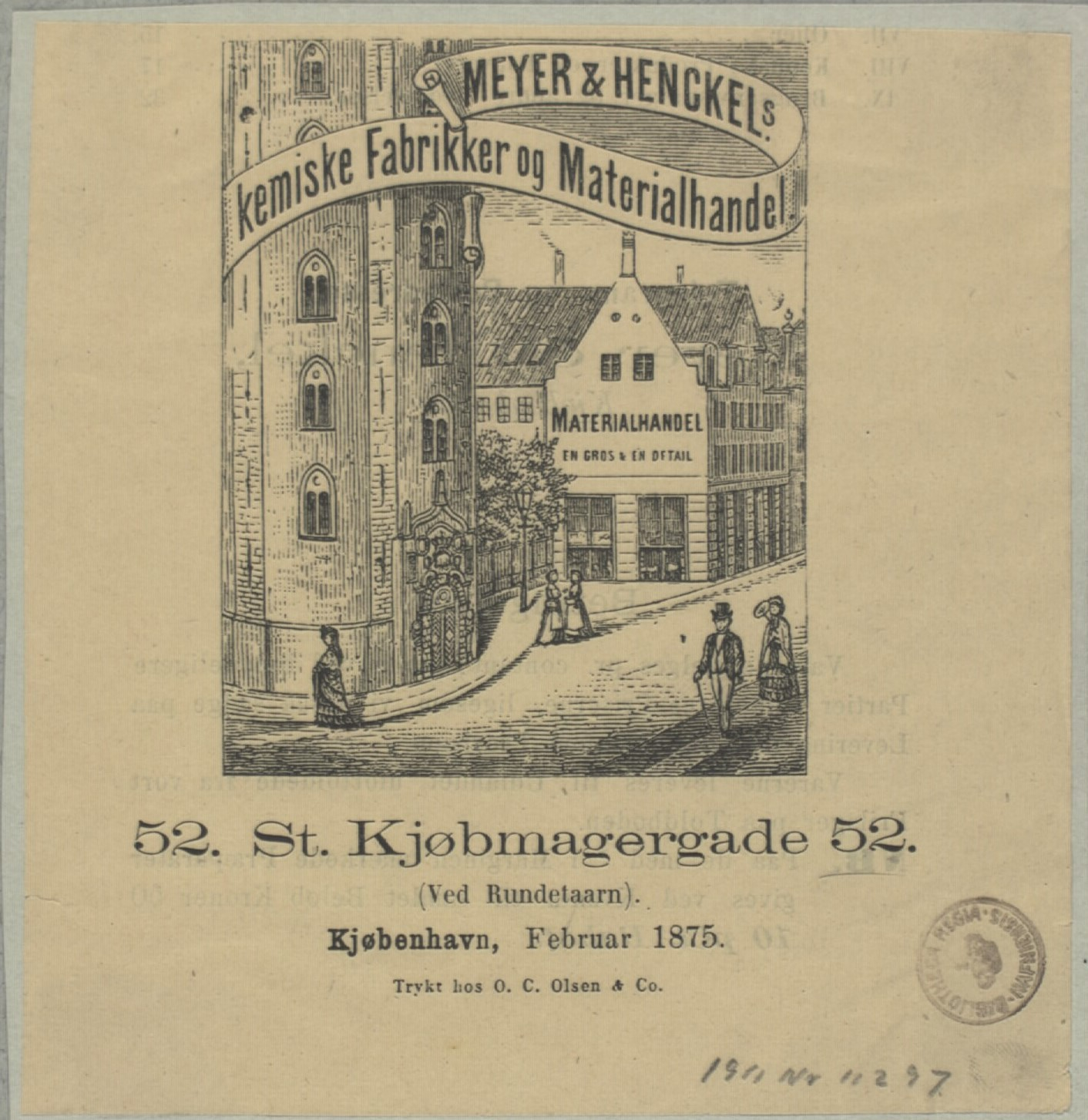
Meyer & Henckel's chemical factory.

Meyer & Henckel, a chemical company, was based in the building from the 1870s.

Vilhelm Prior's bookshop and publishing house relocated to the building in 1875. His son Aage Prior (1866-1936) became a partner in 1900. He continued the operations alone after his father's death in 1910. It was after his own death continued by his widow Anine Prior with their aughters Anna and Estrid Prior as management until at least 1950. The bookshop closed in 1964.

In 1943-1970, the two upper floors of the side wing served as dormitory for theology students.

== Today ==
Studenterhuset is an independent organisation affiliated with the University of Copenhagen and managed by a volunteer board consisting of students. The house is run by students (typically around 200 volunteers from up to 40 countries)), alongside a small group of paid staff. The activities include a café, concerts, debates and a wide range of other events. Studenterhuset is also responsible for arranging the University of Copenhagen's annual spring festival.
