= List of Danish writers =

This is a list of Danish writers.

- Naja Marie Aidt
- Erik Amdrup
- Hans Christian Andersen
- Vilhelm Andersen
- Herman Bang
- Peter Bastian
- Hjalmar Bergström
- Jens Bjerre
- Sara Blaedel
- Karen Blixen (Isak Dinesen)
- Anders Bodelsen
- Georg Brandes
- Suzanne Brøgger
- Inger Christensen
- Stig Dalager
- Christine Daugaard
- Tove Ditlevsen
- Inge Eriksen
- Bent Faurby
- Karl Gjellerup
- Anna Grue
- Meïr Aron Goldschmidt
- Julius Villiam Gudmand-Høyer
- Thorkild Hansen
- Johan Ludvig Heiberg
- Henrik Hertz
- Peer Hultberg
- Peter Høeg
- Jens Peter Jacobsen
- Johannes Vilhelm Jensen
- Ellen Jørgensen (historian)
- Christian Jungersen
- Søren Kierkegaard
- Eigil Knuth
- Birgithe Kosovic
- Tom Kristensen
- Lars Kroijer
- Cornelia von Levetzow
- Olivia Levison
- Christian Madsbjerg
- Svend Åge Madsen
- Viggo Madsen
- Peter Nansen
- Henri Nathansen
- Martin Andersen Nexø
- Robert Storm Petersen
- Henrik Pontoppidan
- Jytte Rex
- Klaus Rifbjerg
- Aksel Sandemose
- Peter Seeberg
- Tage Skou-Hansen
- Jan Sonnergaard
- Villy Sørensen
- Pia Tafdrup
- Harald Tandrup
- Kirsten Thorup
- Dan Turell
- Gustav Wied

== See also ==
- List of Danish poets
- Danish literature
- List of Danish women writers
