= Charrière =

Charrière may refer to:

== People ==
- Camille Charrière (born 1987), English-French fashion influencer and writer
- François Charrière (1893–1976), Swiss bishop of the Catholic Church
- Henri Charrière (1906–1973), French murderer and author
- Isabelle de Charrière (1740–1805), Dutch-Swiss writer
- Joseph-Frédéric-Benoît Charrière (1803–1876), Swiss-French surgical-instrument inventor
- Sylvie Charrière (born 1961), French politician

== Other ==
- Prissé-la-Charrière, municipality in western France
- Centre Sportif de la Charrière, sports stadium in La Chaux-de-Fonds, Switzerland
- The Charrière, alternate name for the unit French on the French catheter scale
