= Camillus Nyrop =

Danish physician and musical instrument maker

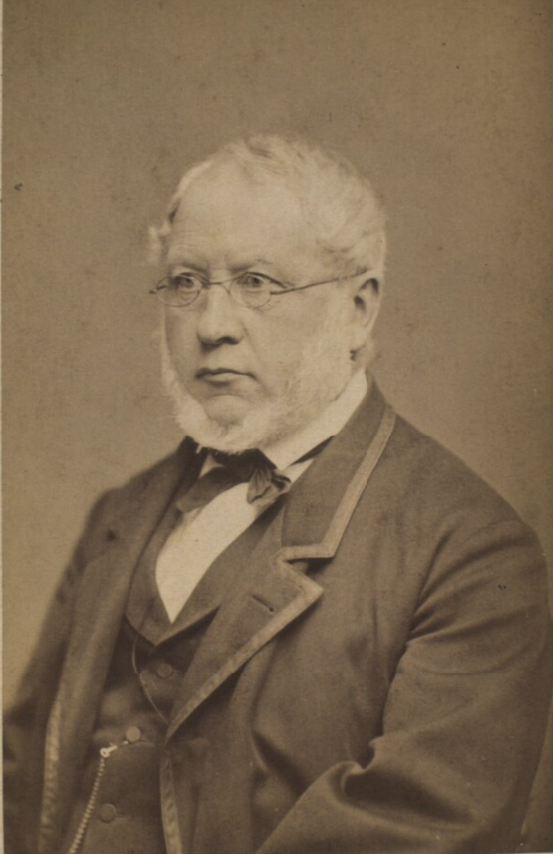
- Born: 18 February 1811; Riserup, Denmark
- Died: 24 December 1883 (aged 72); Copenhagen, Denmark
- Occupation: Instrument makerbuilder

Camillus Nyrop (18 February 1811 - 24 December 1883) was a Danish instrumentmaker and bandagist. He was the founder of Camillus Nyrops Etablissement, Denmark's first manufacturer of surgical instruments and artificial limbs.

== Early life and education ==
Nyrop was born on 18 February 1811 in Riserup on Falster, the son of provost Christopher Ntrop (1752–1831) and his second wife Cathrine Elisabeth Magdalene Heilmann (1765–1842). He was an apprentice in court turner J. G. Schwartz's workshop in 1816–22. He had already at this point started to take an interest in surgical instruments. In 1833, he was articled to J. H. Hüttemeier to improve his knowledge of metalwork while at the same time studying under Hans Christian Ørsted at the College of Advanced Technology. After that, he went abroad to further his study of surgical instruments in Berlin and Vienna before arriving in Paris in 1836, where he became an apprentice to Joseph-Frédéric-Benoît Charrière and collaborated with leading French surgeons.

== Career ==
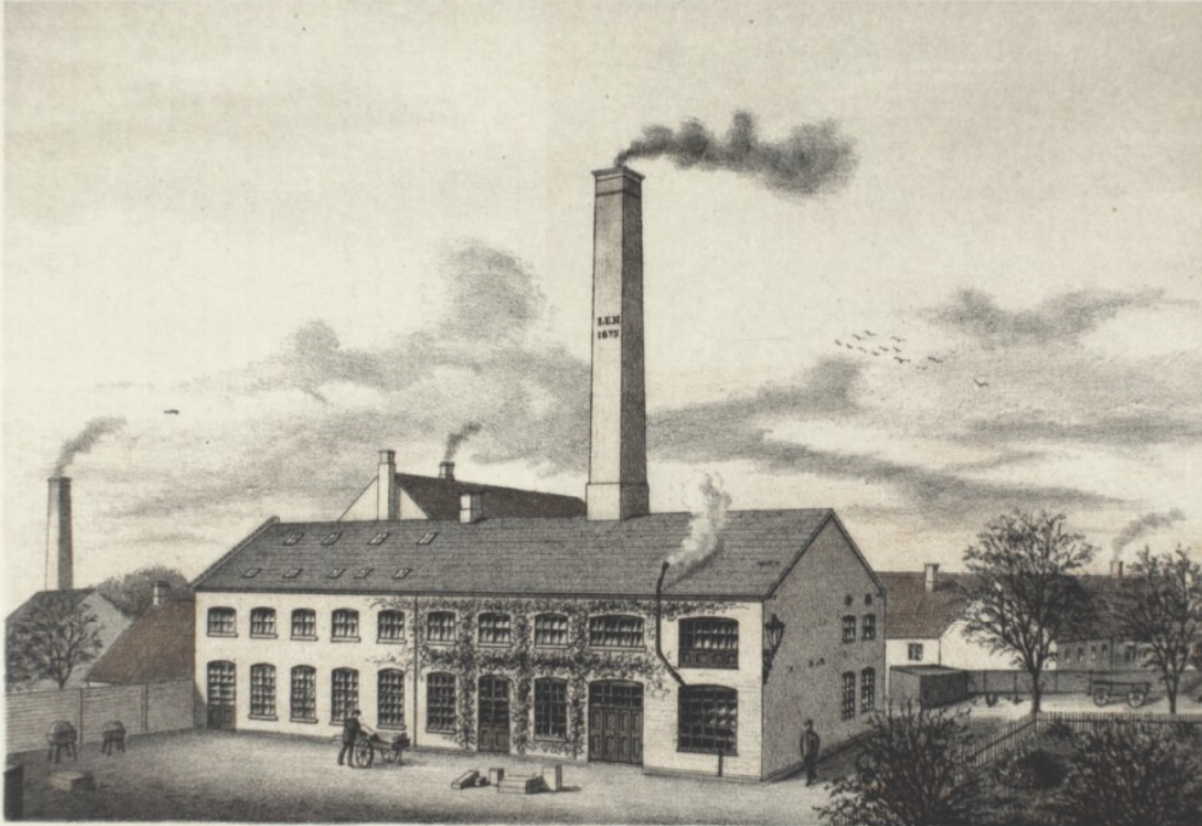
Camillus Nyrop's factory at Ryesgade 105 in Copenhagen

Back in Copenhagen in 1838, he immediately started his own production of surgical instruments. His qualifications as an instrumentmaker and bandagist was soon noticed by the city's medical doctors and surgeons.

He was in 1841 granted status of official instrumentmaker by the Royal Danish Academy of Surgery, and in 1843, after the academy had been merged with the University of Copenhagen's Department of Medicine, he was granted status of university instrumentmaker. He later went abroad on several occasions, both to update his knowledge of surgical instruments and to become familiar with new areas of the metal industry. In 1846–50, he operated a tool factory in a partnership with Theodor Marstrand.

Nyrop was aboard member of Industriforeningen from 1843. During the First Schleswig War, 1848–49, he devoted himself to the development of better artificial limbs for the many injured soldiers who returned from the war. Several of his inventions won him international acclaim. Towards the end of his career he increasingly focused on simplifying his surgical armamentarium.

Nyrop published Bandager og Instrumenter I-III in 1864–77.

== Camillus Nyrops Etablissement ==
The company was based at Købmagergade 43. The building is from 1880 and was designed by Ludvig Fenger. The building around the corner at Løvstræde 4 was also built for the company. It was designed by Martin Nyrop.

== Personal life and legacy ==
Nyrop married Karen Christine (Kamma) Andersen (5 March 1822 - 10 December 1893), the daughter of Toldbod Vinhus Hans Andersen (1792–1865) and Juliane Marie Berggreen (c. 1780–1841), on 6 July 1839 in the Garrison Church in Copenhagen.

Nyrop was awarded the Medal of Merit in 1850 and amade a titular professor in 1860. He died on 24 December 1883 and is buried at the Garrison Cemetery in Copenhagen.

His company, Camillus Nyrops Etablissement, was continued by two of his sons, Johan Ernst Nyrop (1850–1931) and Hans Louis Nyrop (1861–1931). It was converted into a limited company (aktieselskab) in 1924 and merged with Hjalmar Maag A/S. His other sons were the industrial historian Camillus Nyrop (1843–1918) and the filologist Kristoffer Nyrop.

Johan Ernst Nyrop's son was the founder of the Niro Atomizer spray dryer.

== See also ==
- Cornelius Knudsen
