= Admiralgade 28 =

Listed building in Copenhagen

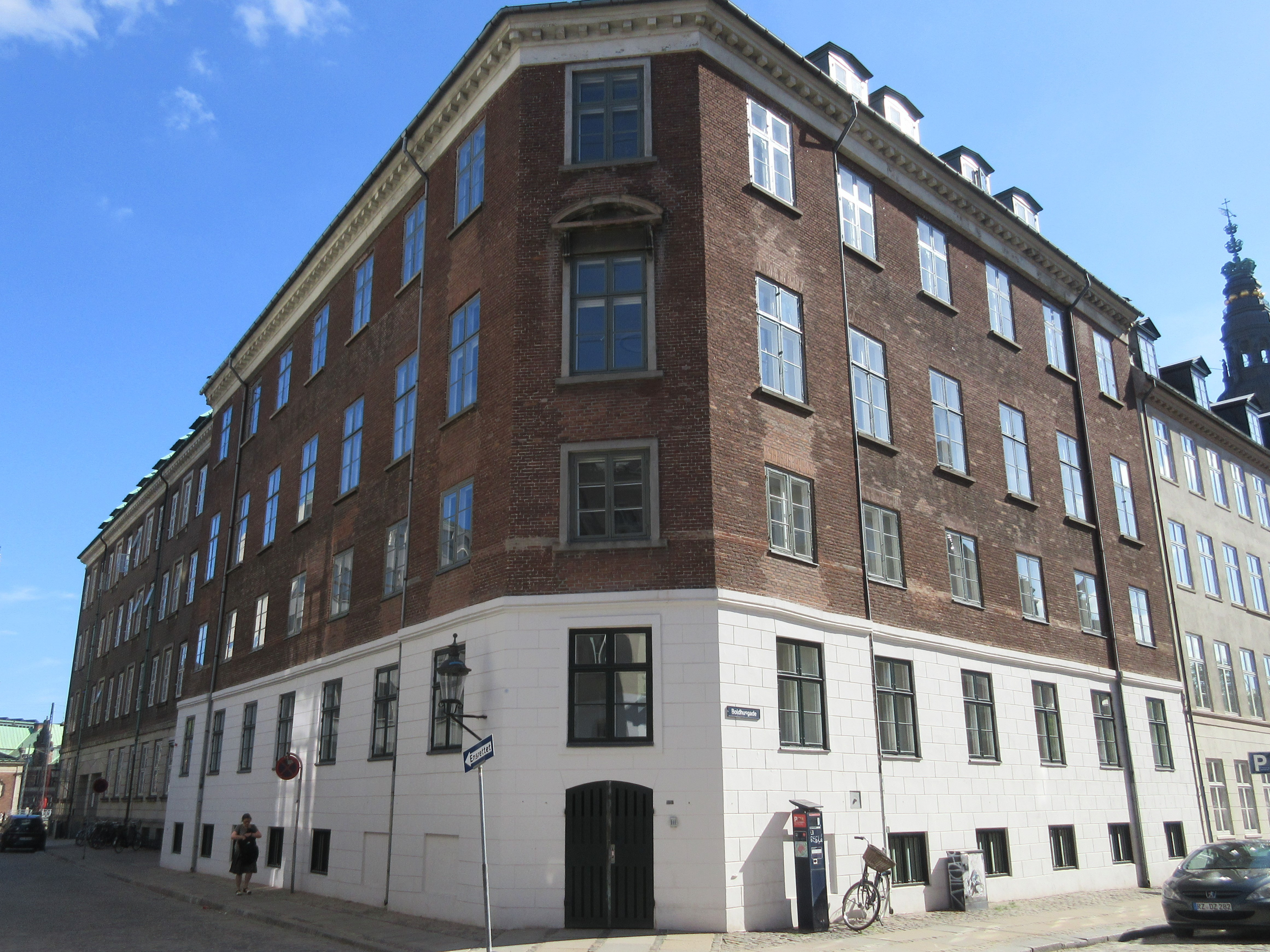
- Interactive map of the Admiralgade 28 area

General information
- Architectural style: Neoclassical
- Location: Copenhagen, Denmark
- Coordinates: 55°40′38.35″N 12°34′56.5″E
- Construction started: 1798
- Completed: 1799

Admiralgade 28 (formerly Boldhusgade 1) is a Neoclassical building situated at the corner of Admiralgade and Boldhusgade in the Old Town of Copenhagen, Denmark. Constructed in 1798–99 by the prolific master builders Philip Lange and Lauritz Laurberg Thrane as part of the rebuilding of the city following the Copenhagen Fire of 1795., it is now part of a large complex of ministerial buildings which comprises the entire block. The building was listed in the Danish registry of protected buildings and places in 1950. Copenhagen's Student Association (Studenterforeningen) was based in the building from 1824 to 1831 and again from 1742 to 1863. Other notable former residents include the music retailers and publishers CCarl Christian Lose den ældre, merchant and Cherry Heering-manufacturer Peter Heering and the graphical studio Pacht & Crone.

== History ==
=== 17th century ===
The property was by 1653 owned by notarius publicus Valentin Suhm. After his death, on 26 April 1655, it was by his heirs Michel Suhm and Henrick Suhm sold to Magdalene Carsten Valentinsdatter Suhm (widow of Hendrich Ridemand). She was later married to first Otto Heider and then Christen Pedersen (Generalfiskal). In June 1684, the property was sold to royal kitchen inspector Edvart (Ewert) Kruse. His property was listed in Copenhagen's first cadastre of 1689 as No. 223 in the city's East Quarter.

=== 18th century ===
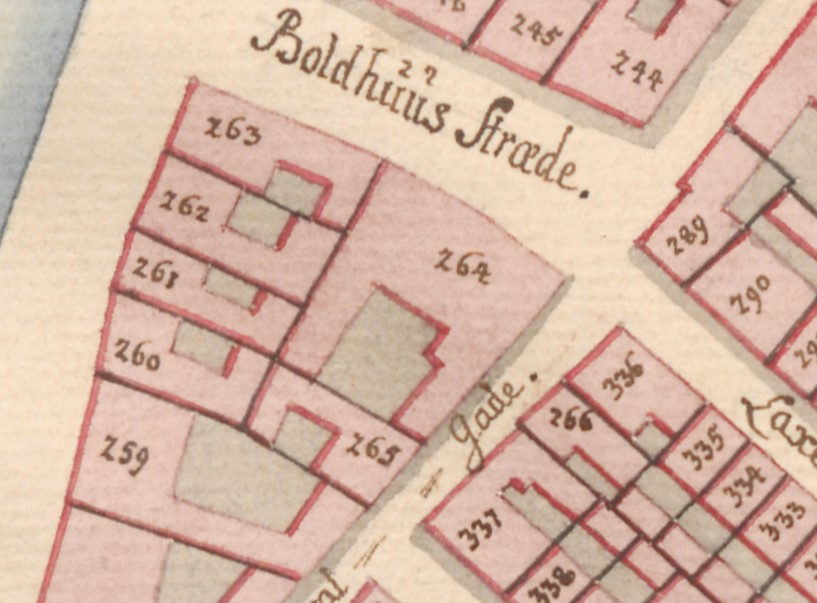
No. 264 seen on a detail from Christian Gedde's map of the East Quarter, 1757.

The property was after Kruuse's death on 10 June 1701 sold at public auction to the Queen's overhodmester Claus Hartvig Berkentin til Preetz. On 30 September 1702, he sold it to royal customs inspector Hans Meyer. Meyer remained the owner of the building until at least 1728.

The property was listed in the new cadastre of 1756 as No. 264 in the East Quarter. It belonged to wine retailer (vintapper) Stephen Jacob Smith at that time.

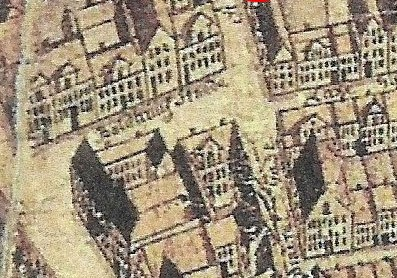
The property seen on a detail from Christian Gedde's elevated map of Copenhagen, 1651.

The property was later acquired by army officer Ferdinand Wilhelm Falbe. His property was home to 21 residents in four households at the 1787 census. Falbe, who then served as 2nd Major in the Crown Prince's Regiment, resided in the building with his wife Friderikke Elisabeth, their son Christian Andreas and daughter Engelke Charlotte, one male servant, a coachman (soldier) and three maids. Hinrich Anton Mau (1751–1805), a chamber secretary, resided in the building with his wife Catharina Elisabeth Badstuber /1767–1804, granddaughter of Povl Badstuber) and two maids. Johan Lundberg, a manufacturer of pens, resided in the building with his wife Lovise Lundberg, a six-year-old son from the wife's first marriage and two maids. Christen Jørgensen, a barkeeper (widower), resided in the basement with his sister Johanne Jørgensen and the lodger Jørgen Christensen (workman).

The property wasdestroyed in the Copenhagen Fire of 1795, together with most of the other buildings in the area. The present building on the site was constructed in 1798–99 by Philip Lange and Lauritz Laurberg Thrane.

=== 19th century ===
The property was home to 29 residents in five households at the 1801 census. Eitchen Frans Haly, a music publisher and retailer, resided in the building with his wife Juliana Brunner and two maids. Eliases Mosses Cohen, a bookprinter, resided in the building with his wife Anna Moresky, one maid and five apprentices. Christopher Hansen, a club host, resided in the building with his wife Johanne Linderup, their three children (aged six to 13), a caretaker (soldier) and three maids. Hans Lange, a barkeeper, resided in the basement with his wife Karen Jacobsen. Inger Margretha Brode, another barkeeper, resided in the basement with her two children (aged 12 and 17).

E.F.J. Haly was originally from France. He had established a music and art dealership in Copenhagen in 1793. In 1802, he sold the building and associated business to Christian Gottlieb Lose. Lose had come to Copenhagen from Silesia. His property was listed in the new cadastre of 1806 as No. 225 in the East Quarter.

In 1814, Lose ceded the publishing house to his son Carl Christian Lose (1787-1835). In 1815, C. C. Lose partnered with the lithographer Heinrich Wenzler. He was originally from Thuringia. On 8 November that same year, Lose and Wenzler were granted an eight-year monopoly on the lithographic printing method in Denmark. In 1820, Lose sold his workshop to the government for 2,000 rigsdaler. In 1821, he started a new business in Gothersgade, laying the foundation for what would later become Edition Wilhelm Hansen.

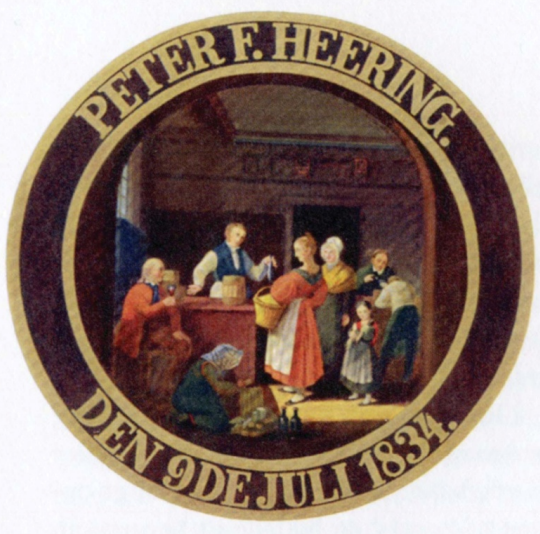
Peter F. Heering's target from the Royal Copenhagen Shooting Society, 1834

Peter Heering established a grocery shop in the basement in 1818. He also started his production of Cherry Heering in the building. In 1838, he moved the operations to the Heering House in Christianshavn.

Copenhagen's recently established Student Association (Studenterforeningen) relocated to the building in 1824. In 1831, it relocated to the more stately Peschier House at Holmens Kanal. In 1841, it returned to its old building at the corner of Boldhusgade and Admiralgade. The property belonged to Wulff Abraham Heymann at that time He owned a number of propertoes in the city. In 1863, Studenterforeningen relocated to its new building on Holmens Kanal. The author Arthur Abrahams (1836-1905) mentions the building in his memoirs Minder om Min Studentertid:

The entrance was from Boldhusgade through a dirty gate that led into an even dirtier yard. From the gate, you went up a flight of stairs to the left, which was no better than the gate and the yard as far as cleanliness was concerned.

In this place, the Students' Association now had the first and second floors above the mezzanine floor.

In the basement resided a fruit and vegetable merchant, whose luxuriant forms meant that she was never called by the members of the Association other than "the fat cellarwoman".

The bookprinter Johan Davidsen (1813-1891) was based in the building from 1862 until the early 1870s. His publications include Fra det gamle kongens København, a topographical-historical account of Copenhagen.

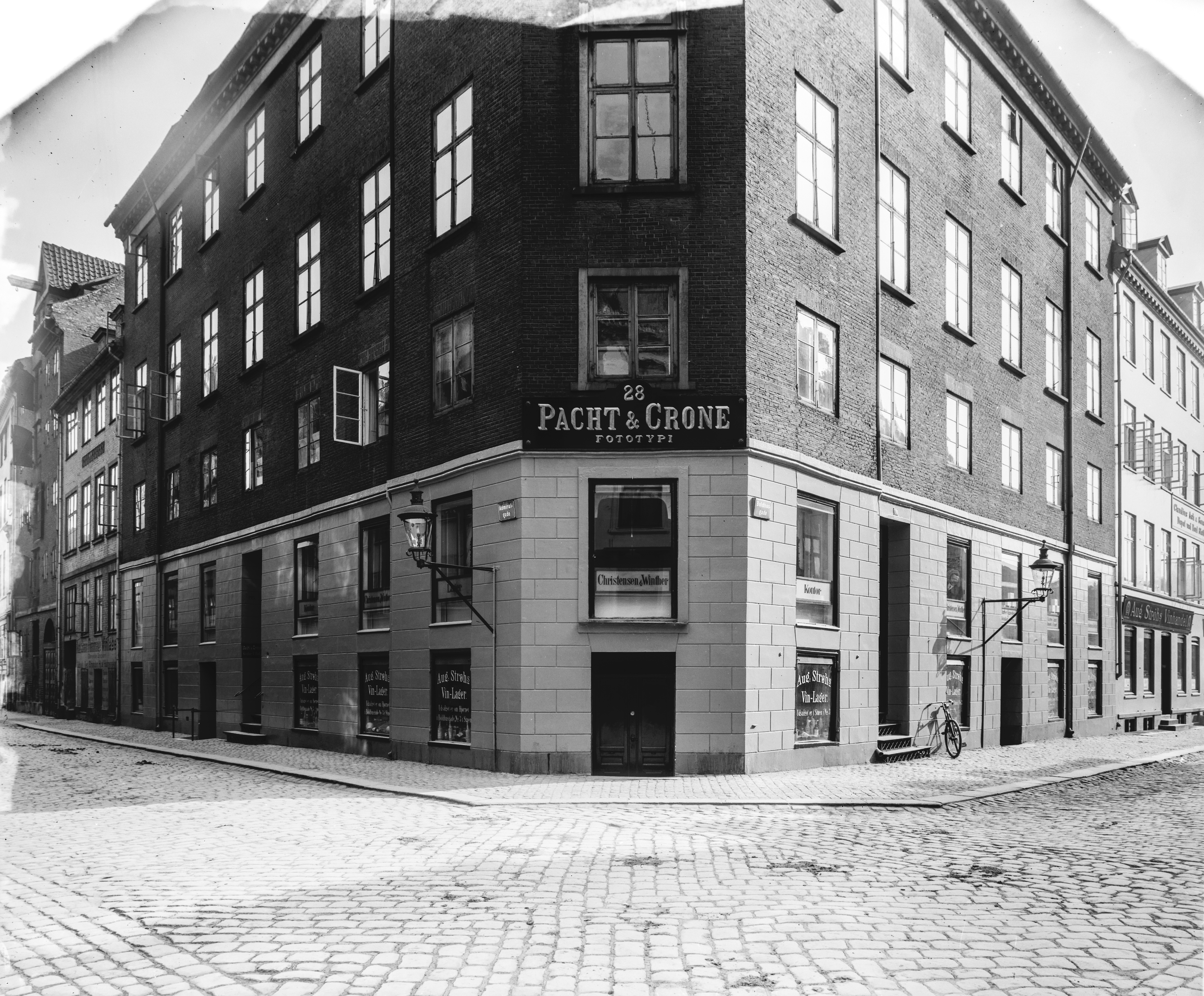
Pacht & Crone's entrance photographed by Johannes Jauerslev, c. 1905.

The graphic studio Pacht & Crone was later based in the building from 1882 until at least 1905.

The entire block was acquired by Fanske Lloyd in the 1930s. The two buildings at Boldhusgade 1/Admiralgade 28 and Ved Stranden 8 were the only buildings that were not demolished. All the other buildings were demolished to make way for a large new building constructed to designs by N. P. P. Gundstrup in 1936–38. The complex was later taken over by the Danish Ministry of Defence.

== Architecture ==
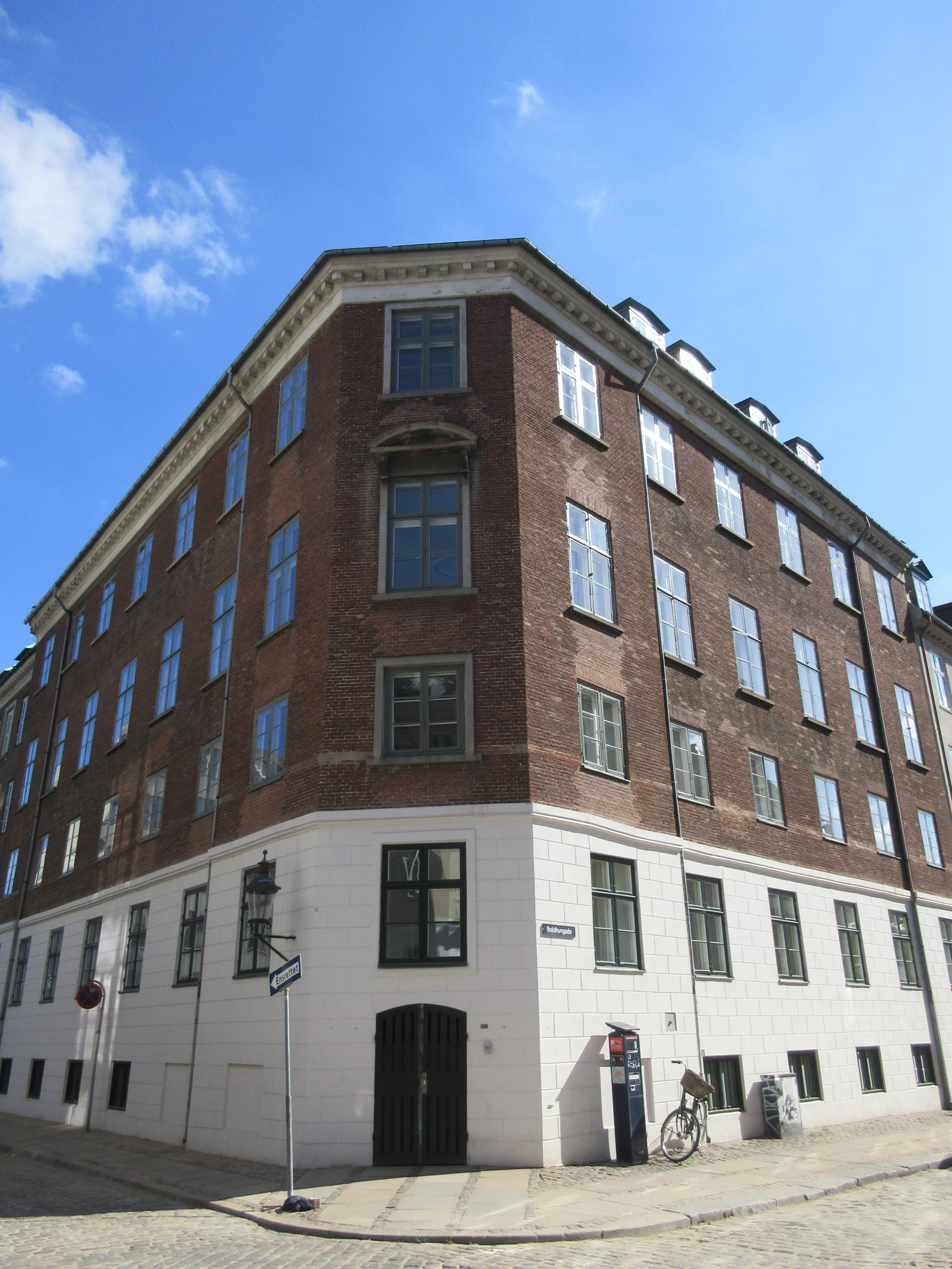
Admiralgade 27.

Admiralgade 28/Boldhusgade 1 is constructed with four storeys over a walk-out basement. It has a seven-bays-long facade towards Admiralgade, a six-bays-long facade towards Boldhusgade and a chamfered corner. The chamfered corner bay was dictated for all corner buildings by Jørgen Henrich Rawert's and Peter Meyn's guidelines for the rebuilding of the city after the fire so that the fire department's long ladder companies could navigate the streets more easily. The ground floor and exposed part of the basement is plastered and white-painted. The upper part of the facade is in exposed brick with extruded joints. The facade is finished by a substantial white-plastered modillioned cornice. The second-floor corner window is topped by a segmental pediment.

== Today ==
The building is now used by the Ministry of Ecionomy at Ved Stranden 8.
