= Lars Kroijer =

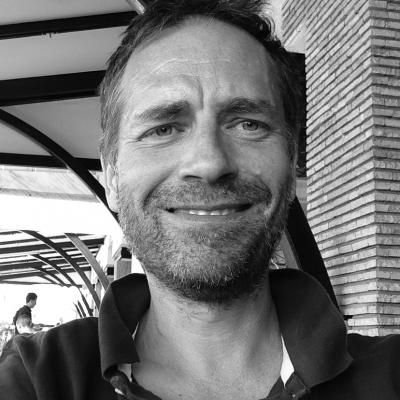
- Education: Harvard University; Harvard Business School
- Occupations: Author, Hedge Fund manager
- Website: Kroijer.com

Lars Kroijer is a Danish entrepreneur, author, and former hedge fund manager. During his career, he worked for HBK Investments and Lazard Freres, before co-founding a London-based hedge fund. Holte Capital was founded in 2002 and operated until 2008 when capital was returned to investors during the 2008 financial crisis.

Kroijer has released two financial books as an author. The first came in 2010 titled, Money Mavericks: Confessions of a Hedge Fund Manager. The book studied the options available to investors, drawing the conclusion that many hedge funds' fees were too high. Kroijer released his second book in 2013, Investing Demystified. The book received positive reviews from both MoneyWeek and also The Morning Star.

== Education ==
Kroijer graduated in economics magna cum laude from Harvard University, before receiving an MBA from Harvard Business School.

== Career ==
In his early career, Kroijer worked at the London office of HBK Investments, focusing on special situations investing. He also worked in New York City at the hedge fund SC Fundamental and as part of the investment banking division of Lazard Freres. In 2002, Kroijer and his co-founder Brian O'Callaghan founded Holte Capital, a London-based hedge fund.

During an interview with CNBC, Kroijer explained that his hedge fund operated in London for a total of five years, before deciding at the end of 2007 to return capital and continue investing with his own money. After his hedge fund ceased operations, he released his first book in 2010, Money Mavericks: Confessions of a Hedge Fund Manager.

Kroijer released his second book in 2013, which was titled, Investing Demystified. The book led Kroijer to be interviewed by the CFA Institute to discuss the opinions he shared on indexing in his 2013 book. Around the same period, he was also interviewed by BFM following the release of his book.

In November 2013, Kroijer appeared on The Motley Fool's Money podcast. Around the same time as the release of his first book, Kroijer's media appearances all centred on how hard it was for investors to gain an edge, when compared to retail funds. He also became a financial writer for a number of media outlets, such as the CFA Institute and also became a media commentator on financial issues.

Kroijer suggested in 2013 that during the 2008 financial crisis, he lost £10 million in a single day. On reflection, he has suggested that there were a number of things investors should avoid doing. This included suggesting that he believed the primary cause of underperformance in trading was investors attempting to do something different and that many of them thought, "they can beat the markets".

Kroijer founded AlliedCrowds in 2015, a crowd funding platform aimed to assist people who want to directly invest in aid projects. He stated in a BBC World News interview that the demand and growth of roughly 100% a year came because there is greater accountability through crowdfunding, when compared to traditional aid funding.

The success of his book Investing Demystified, led Kroijer to guest speak and launch a number of online resources to assist people new to investing. This work led him to notably teach a free course on Udemy, along with other online seminars.

== Money Mavericks: Confessions of a Hedge Fund Manager ==
In 2010, he released his first book, Money Mavericks: Confessions of a Hedge Fund Manager. In the book, Kroijer studies the loosely regulated fees charged by investment firms. He theorizers that fees across the industry are too high, when compared to the risk and return many hedge funds make.

A New York Times review stated that Hedge funds typically charge an annual management fee of 2 percent and a performance fee of around 20 percent, meaning investors keep 80 percent of the gain in this instance. Kroijer concluded that often hedge funds will benefit from a bull market, if the market grew by 10% then the customer would receive 7% in profits from most hedge funds. If this was compared to a Vanguard fund, which would also benefit from the bull market, the difference in profits would be substantial as the customer would keep a higher percentage of profits. A second edition of the book was released in 2012.

== Investing Demystified ==
Kroijer published Investing Demystified in 2013. The book studies a number of options when it comes to investing. During an interview with Morning Star, Kroijer said that too many sole investors were trying to beat the market, when in reality all they were after was a good return on their investment. While speaking with Morning Star, he also studied the costs of an active fund compared to a passive fund for someone using the fund to save for a pension. Kroijer regularly discusses the term "financial edge" in the book, speaking about how the average investor struggles to beat the top indexes available to consumers.

Kroijer went on to surmise that the average citizen in the United Kingdom making £50,000 a year and saving 10% of that year between the age of 25 and 67. That money would then be put into equity markets. If historical equity market data is used throughout this period, he then studied the difference at retirement in the fund and also the costs of both an active and passive fund. Kroijer concluded in the interview, the difference at retirement for that person between having picked a passive fund; that's called the world equity index and an active fund that tracks the same thing, the difference in fees will amount to almost £300,000 in today's money. So, provocatively, I say that's the equivalent of seven Porsches.

The book received mainly positive reviews in the financial press. In late 2013, the Morning Star included the book in their "ten must read" books over the Christmas period. Investing Demystified was also selected by MoneyWeek as part of their list for the best financial books in 2013. MoneyWeek again selected the book for its "best books on investing for beginners" section in 2016. A second edition of the book was released in 2017, which was ranked in the top 10 investing books by Financial Expert.
