= Regensen =

Coordinates: 55°40′52″N 12°34′30″E

- Collegium Domus Regiæ
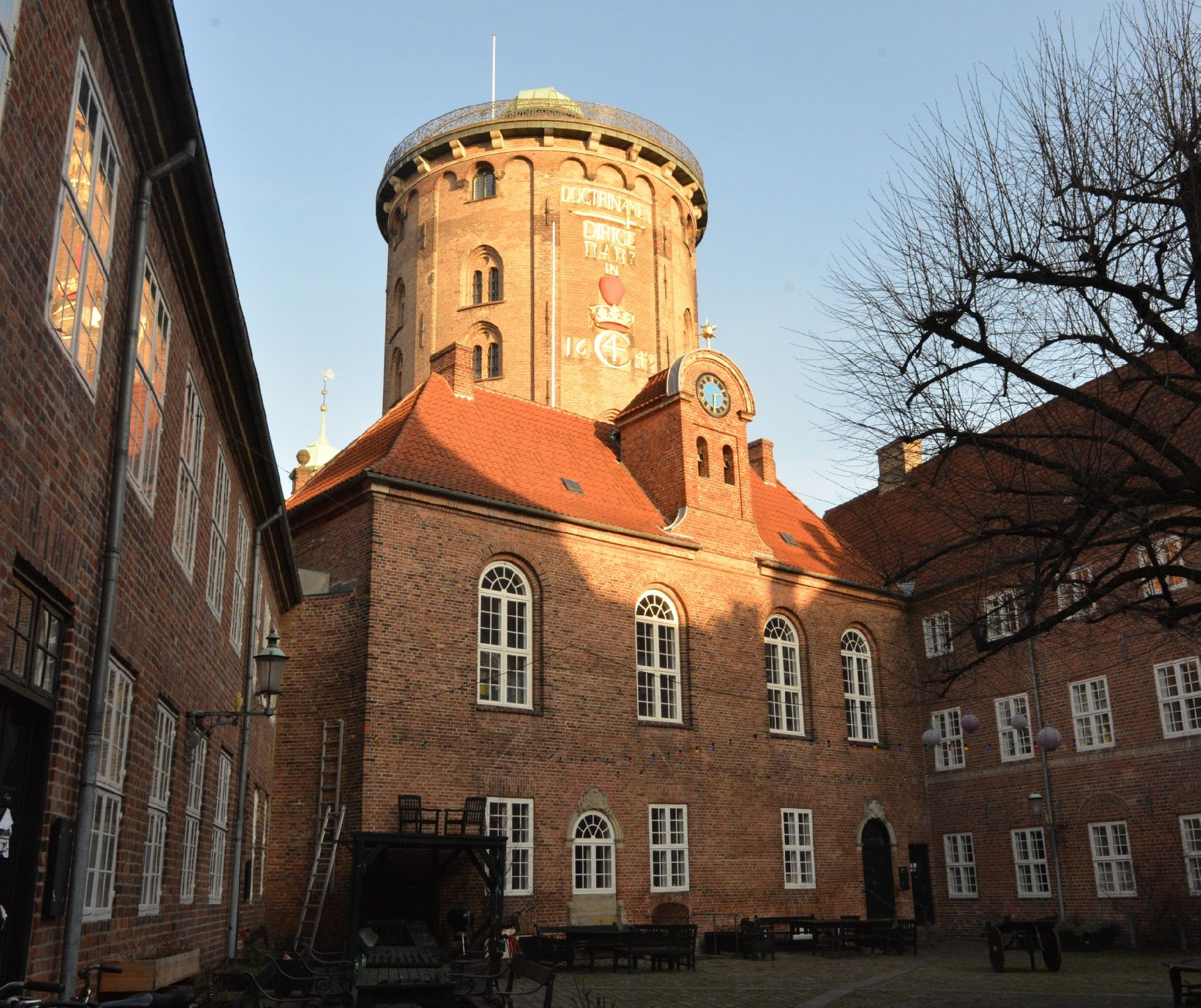
- The courtyard of Regensen, with the Rundetaarn in background
- Interactive map of the Regensen area

General information
- Location: Store Kannikestræde 2, Copenhagen, Denmark
- Construction started: 1623
- Completed: 1628
- Opened: 1624
- Client: King Christian IV
- Affiliation: University of Copenhagen

Regensen (original Latin name: Collegium Domus Regiæ, English: The College of the Royal House) is a residential college for students at the University of Copenhagen and Technical University of Denmark (DTU). It is situated in the heart of the old city, right next to the Rundetårn (the Round Tower).

== History ==
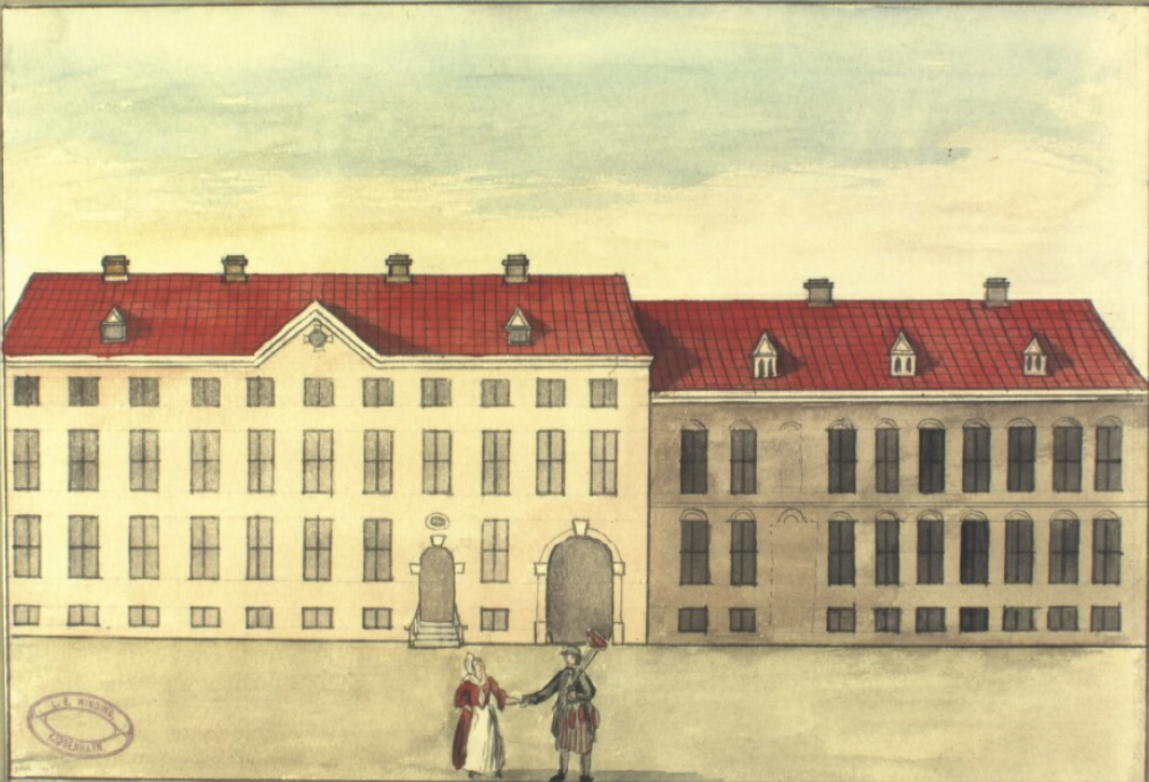
Regensen seen from Store Kannikestræde in 1749

Commissioned by King Christian IV and inaugurated by Royal Charter by on 1 July 1623, Regensen has for centuries provided a unique living and working environment for 100 students. Some of the buildings burned down along with the rest city in the Great Fire of Copenhagen in 1728, but was rebuilt the same year.

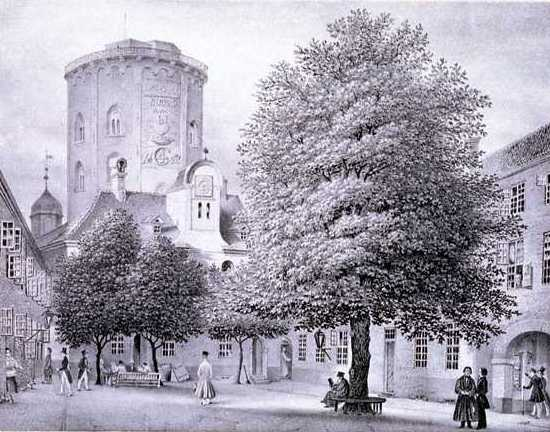
Regensen in the 1840s with Rundetårn in the background

Regensen's mission is to provide housing to talented yet non-privileged students at the University of Copenhagen (KU) and the Technical University of Denmark (DTU). Until the 1980s, the foundation behind Regensen, Kommunitetet, provided free housing and a scholarship for students chosen for admission. Because of financial difficulties, a small fee was introduced, which helps to contribute toward the cost of utilities, which today is around DKK 1,600 per month. This is still well under housing price levels in Copenhagen and Regensen thus continues to provide financial stability for its students. This is why living in Regensen is considered as a scholarship.

It is the second oldest of the old dormitories of the University of Copenhagen, and many old student traditions live on making the place very lively. Danish citizens studying at the University of Copenhagen or the Technical University of Denmark who have completed two years of full-time studies (120 ECTS points) and have an average grade of at least 7 (in the Danish grading system), can be considered for admission to one of its 100 rooms. Applications are open twice a year, corresponding with the start of the Spring and Autumn semesters. Applications are typically quite competitive, with more than 200 applications for around 5 to 10 spots.

Since 2013, once a year, two scholarships for foreign students are awarded in honour of Jonas Thomsen Sekyere.

Many of Denmark's major social and political debates through the ages have taken shape in the college, through the many prominent alumni ranging from scientists to dramatists, novelists, poets and politicians. Regensen is also characterised by an intricate calendar of special feast days that are observed in the Great Hall with a complex array of festive traditions.

== Famous residents ==
- Ole Borch (1626–90), chemist, Borchs Kollegiums founder
- Thomas Kingo (1634-1703), bishop and poet
- Hans Gram (1685-1748), historiographer, head of the Royal library
- Hans Adolph Brorson (1694-1764), bishop and hymnal
- Søren Gyldendal (1742-1802), bookseller and publisher
- Steen Steensen Blicher (1782-1848), author and pastor
- Rasmus Rask (1787-1832), linguist
- Poul Martin Møller (1794-1838), author and philosopher
- Christian Winther (1796–1876), poet
- Andreas Peter Berggreen (1801-1880), composer, creator of the four-part student song
- Johan Nicolai Madvig (1804–86) philologist and politician
- Ditlev Gothard Monrad (1811-1887), bishop and theologian, council president
- Carl Ploug (1813–94), poet, editor, politician
- Japetus Steenstrup (1813–97), zoologist and archaeologist
- Jens Christian Hostrup (1818–92), poet and priest
- Rasmus Malling-Hansen (1835-1890), priest, superintendent, inventor
- Viggo Hørup (1841-1902), politician and journalist, co-founder of Politiken
- Niels Ryberg Finsen (1860-1904), medicines, Nobel laureate
- Vilhelm Buhl (1881-1954), Social Democratic Prime Minister
- Julius Bomholt (1896-1969), high school principal and Social Democratic minister
- Kaj Munk (1898-1944), priest and poet
- Jørgen-Frantz Jacobsen (1900–38), Faroese author and historian
- Regin Prenter (1907–90), theologian, professor
- Jens Otto Krag (1914–78), Social Democratic Prime Minister
- K. B. Andersen (1914–83), Minister of Social Democracy, Speaker of the Folketing
- Simon Spies (1921-1984), travel king
- Erik Amdrup (1923-1998), surgeon and author
- Mogens Glistrup (1926-2008), politician and lawyer
