= Camille Charrière =

French-English fashion influencer (born 1987)

Camille Sylvie Charrière (born August 1987) is a French and English fashion influencer and writer. Since 2022 she has been a contributing editor at British Elle.

== Early life ==
Charrière was born to an English-French mother and French father in August 1987. Charrière grew up in Paris and completed a bachelor's degree and master's degree in law at Paris Nanterre University. She moved to London to pursue a career in finance before starting a fashion blog and quit her finance job in 2012.

== Career ==
After she began her blog Camille Over the Rainbow she took on a writing role at Net-a-Porter. She briefly wrote for Matches Fashion. Her blog is now defunct. Between 2016 and 2020 she was a co-host (alongside Monica Ainley) of the Fashion No Filter podcast, notably interviewing Margaret Zhang and Susan Sarandon among others. In 2022 she joined Elle UK as a contributing editor.

As of 2023, she had 1.4 million followers on Instagram. In 2025, it was announced that HarperCollins 4th Estate would publish Charrière's memoir of essays in February 2026.

Charrière has contributed to Elle, i-D, The New York Times, Vogue, British Vogue, The Wall Street Journal, and collaborated with Chloé, Mango, Harrods and more.

== Bibliography ==
- Ashamed (Fourth Estate, 2026)
