= Købmagergade =

Street in Copenhagen, Denmark

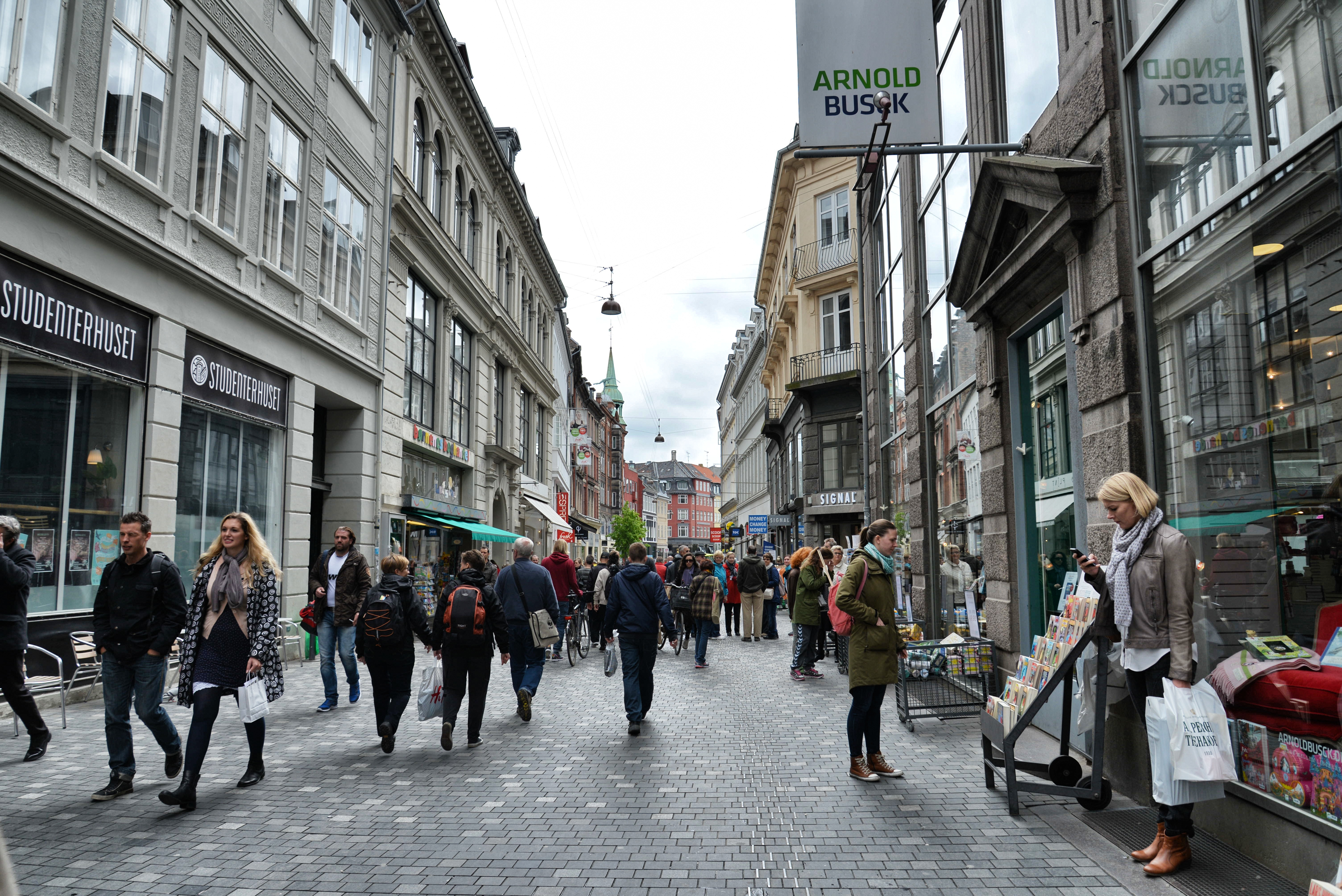
- Købmagergade in 2014
- Length: 510 m (1,670 ft)
- Location: Indre By, Copenhagen, Denmark
- Postal code: 1150
- Nearest metro station: Nørreport
- Coordinates: 55°40′50.88″N 12°34′38.28″E

Købmagergade is a pedestrian shopping street in the Old Town of Copenhagen, Denmark. It connects Amagertorv on Strøget to Nørreport station, although the last section, north of Kultorvet, is part of Frederiksborggade, which continues on the other side of the railway station.

== History ==
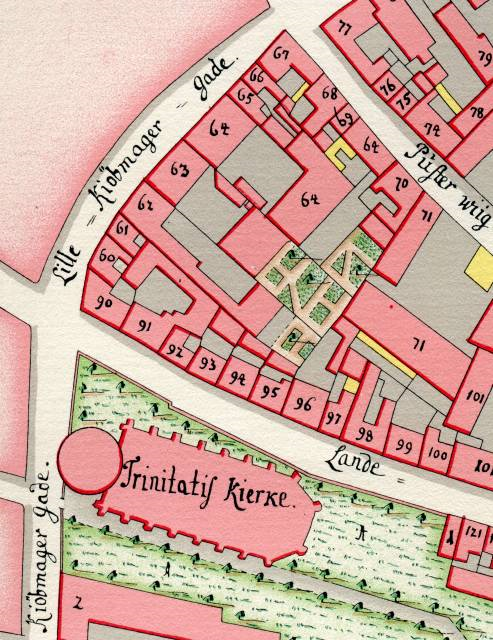
Lille Købmagergade as seen on Gedde's maps of Copenhagen from 1757

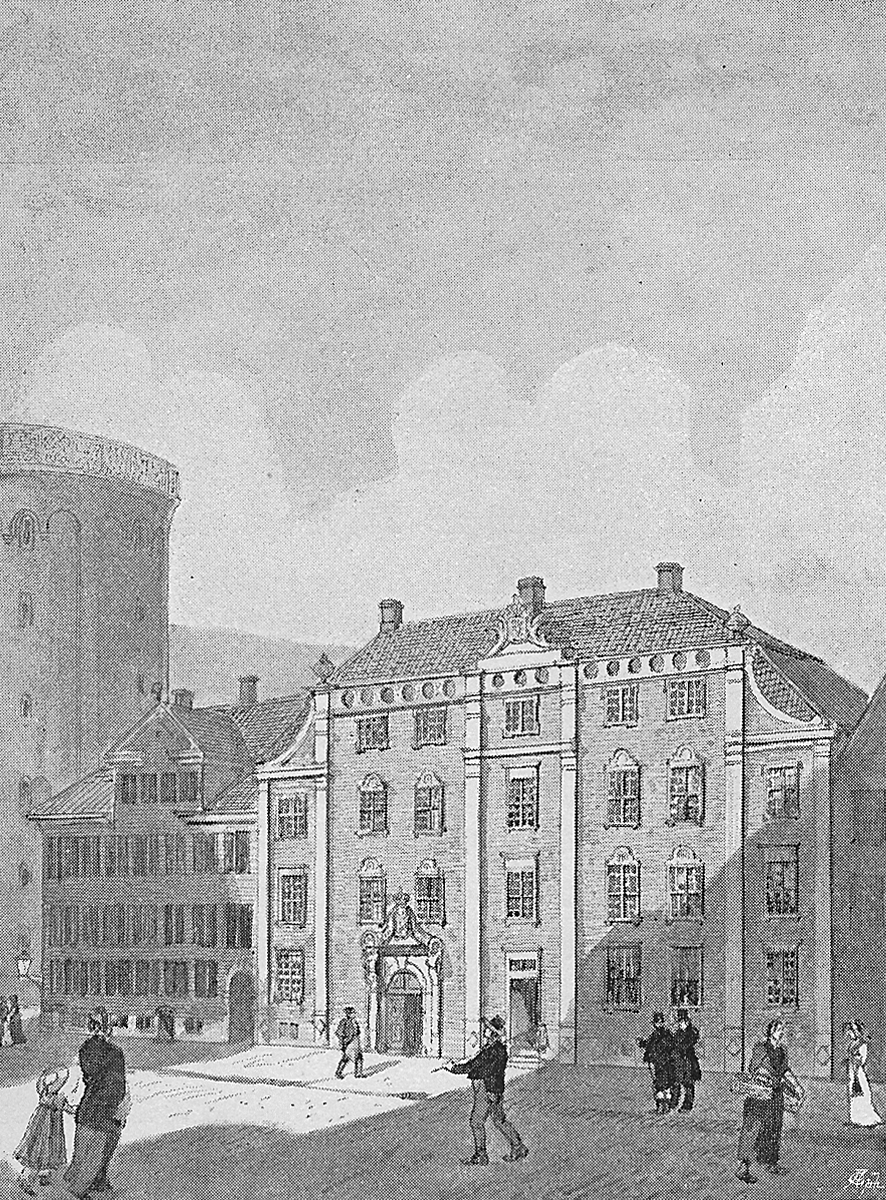
The Royal Porcelain Manufactury

The history of the street dates back to about 1200 when it was part of the main route between Roskilde and the small settlement Havn, which was a hub for crossings to Amager and Scania. Between 1380 and 1463, documents refer to the street as Bjørnebrogade. It later became known as Kiødmangergade after the butchers who had their stalls along the street. Kjødmanger ("meatmonger") is an old Danish word for butcher. The meat market later moved to Skindergade but the name stuck with to the street, although it later changed to Kjøbmagergade and then Købmagergade. The form Kjødmagergade is first known from 1595 although the old form Kjødmagergade is still seen in documents from 1656.

The North Gate was moved to the northern end of the street in 1671.

The Royal Porcelain Manufactury was founded in the street in 1775. The company left the street after being taken over by Aluminia, joining the new owners at their site in Frederiksberg (now Porcelænshaven) in 1884.

Købmagergade was pedestrianised in 1973 following the successful pedestrianisation of Strøget in the early 1960s.

== Notable buildings and residents ==
Buildings in the street include the Round Tower, Regensen and the Møinichen Mansion, now Købmagergade Post Office with the Post & Tele Museum. No. 42 is the former Varehuset Messen department store which opened in 1895. The building was designed by Emil Blichfeldt and is topped by a Hermes statue by Julius Schultz. It is now used by Niels Brock Copenhagen Business College whose main building is on Kultorvet.

== Public art, monuments and memorials ==
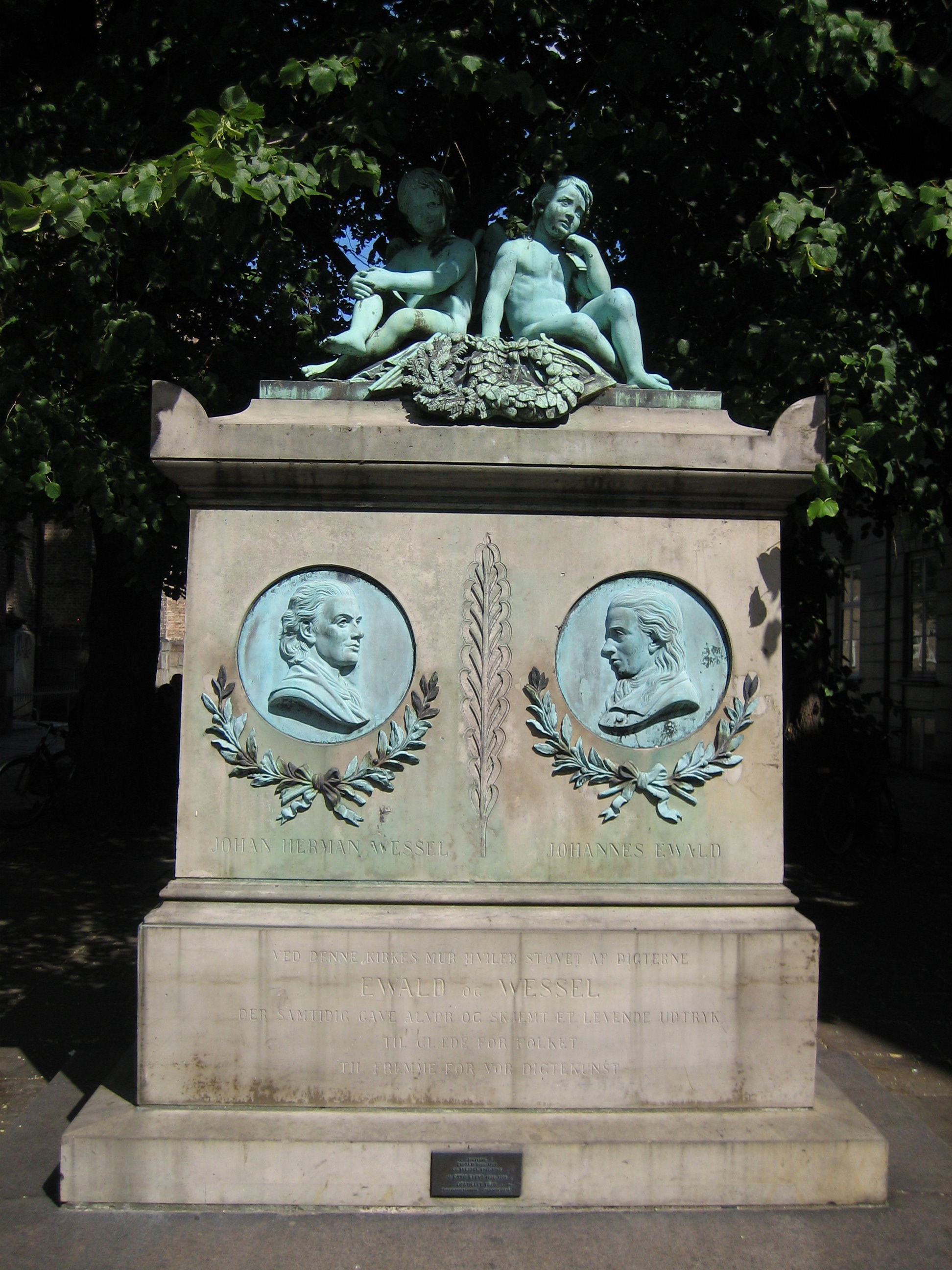
The monument to Peter Herman Wessel and Johannes Ewald

Next to the Round Tower stands a monument to the two 18th-century poets Peter Herman Wessel and Johannes Ewald. The monument was designed by Otto Evens and installed in 1879. It features reliefs in bronze of the two poets.

== Shopping ==
The Illum Department Store is located on the corner of Købmagergade and Strøget. The Arnold Busch chain of book stores has a two-storey flagship store at the Round Tower. International brands and chains with flagship stores in the street include Esprit, Abercrombie & Fitch, Vans and Diesel.

== Cultural references ==
The opening scene of Herman Bang's impressionist 1887 novel Stucco is set on Købmagergade just before the shops close.

== Image gallery ==
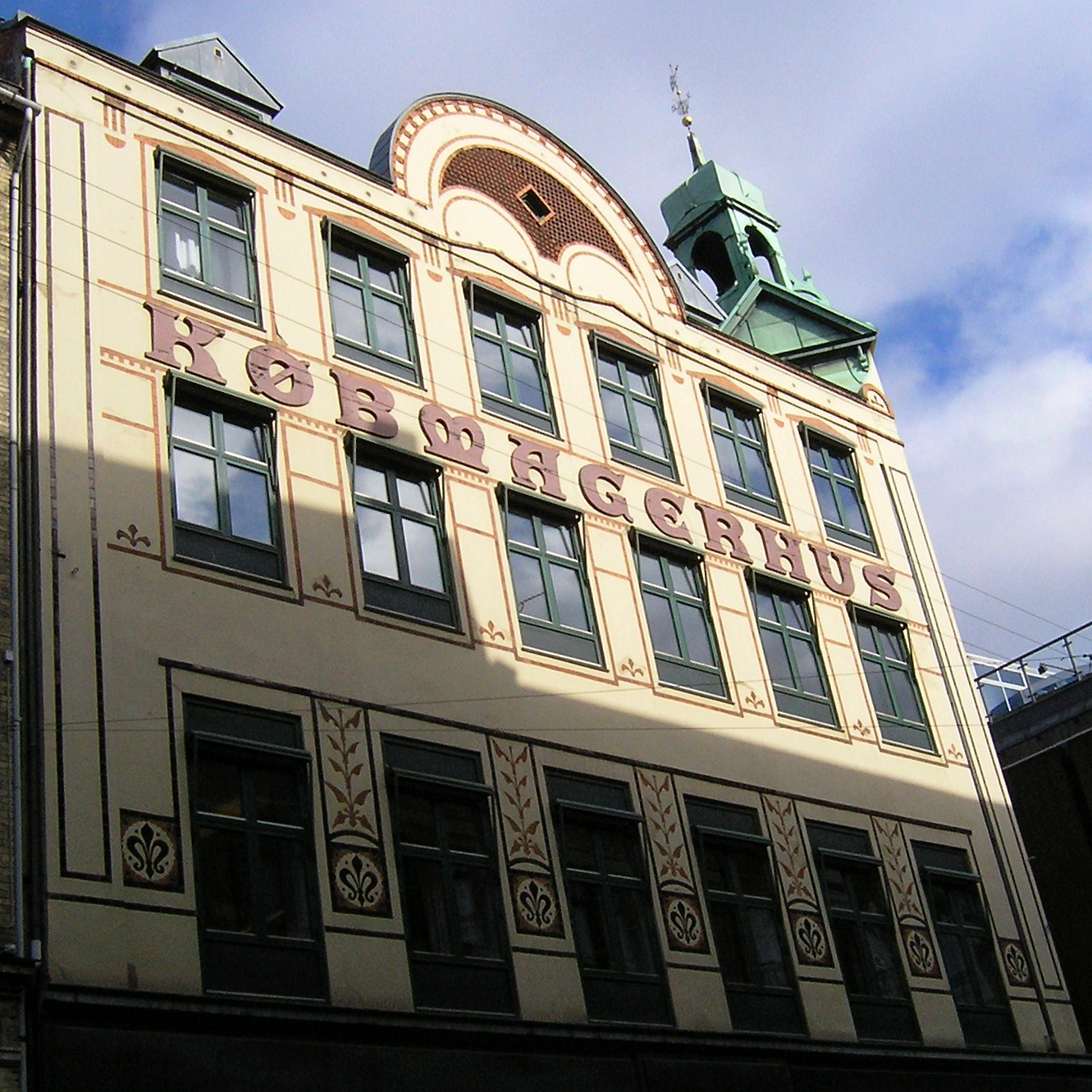
No 22. 22. Købmagerhus from 1898

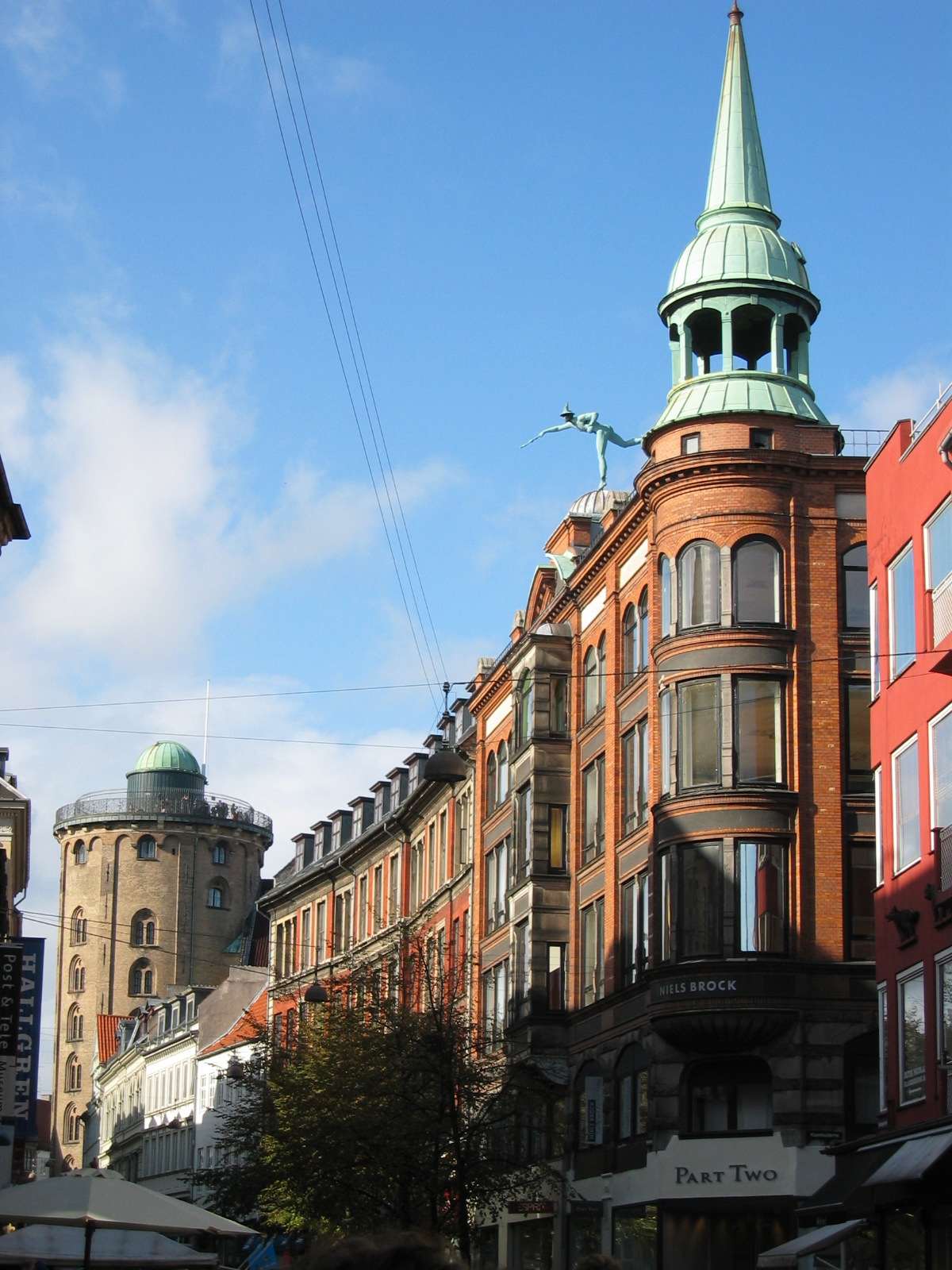
No. 42: Varehuset Messen

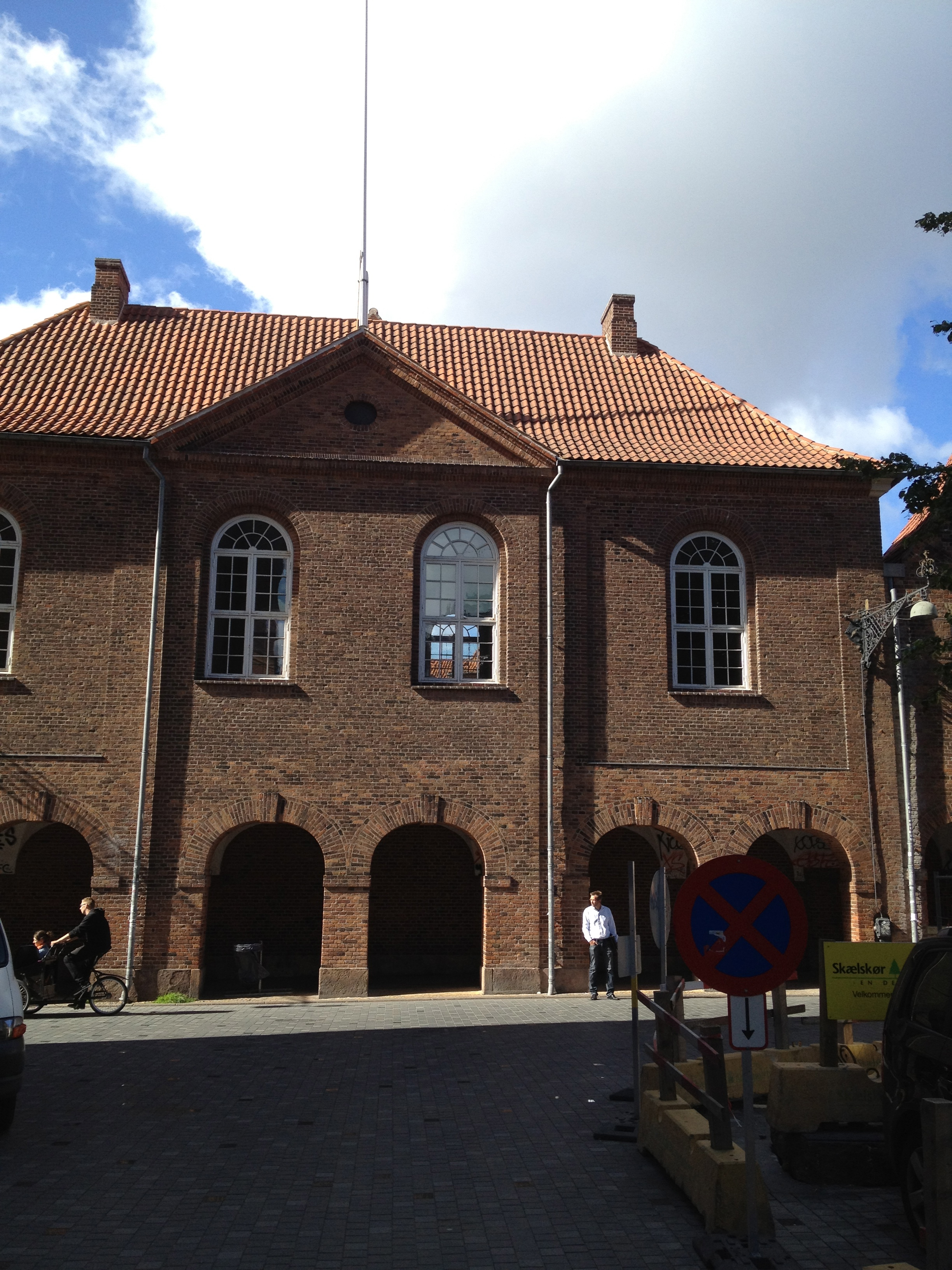
Regensen

== See also ==
- H. H. Thiele
- Vilhelm Prior
- Cornelius Knudsen
