= Christian Madsbjerg =

Danish anthropologist and writer

- Occupations: Writer; Consultant

Christian Madsbjerg is a Danish author, anthropologist, and consultant.

== Books ==
=== The Moment of Clarity (2014) ===
In his 2014 book The Moment of Clarity: Using the Human Sciences to Solve Your Toughest Business Problems (co-authored with Mikkel Rasmussen), Madsbjerg advocates that using approaches from disciplines like philosophy and anthropology are suited to analyzing corporate culture and behavior. He argues that understanding shifts in consumer behavior requires the qualitative data that comes from trained human observers. This provides what they call “thick data”, which seeks the meaning of those shifts. The concepts from the book were later adapted into an article for the Harvard Business Review entitled “An Anthropologist Walks into a Bar”.

=== Sensemaking (2016) ===
In 2016, Madsbjerg published the book Sensemaking: The Power of the Humanities in the Age of the Algorithm, which uses a combination of philosophy and entrepreneurial thinking. The book draws its examples from Madsbjerg's own career as well as interviews with other individuals.

=== Look (2023) ===
In 2023, Madsbjerg published the book Look: How to Pay Attention in a Distracted World, which is based on a class he taught called “Human Observation” at The New School in New York City. The book includes the concept of “hyper-reflection”, what he defines as the meta-skill of learning to see how other people see. According to Madsbjerg, there are three different types of attention, and hyper reflection is the one that requires the most skill and practice. In a review of the book in The Wall Street Journal, author Meghan Cox Gurdon stated that Madsbjerg “attempts to impart the wisdom he has acquired from art and philosophy and from the practical experience of running a corporate consultancy.”

== Consulting ==
Madsbjerg's consultancy work was covered in the book Cultural Anthropology by Serena Nanda and Richard Warms, focusing on the use of ethnographic research in his work with Lego. His work was also covered in Matthew Engelke's book How to Think Like an Anthropologist, specifically his work in the pharmaceutical industry.

In 2005, Madsbjerg founded ReD Associates with Mikkel Rasmussen in Copenhagen. Using methodologies like ethnographic research and phenomenology, ReD Associates has been described by some as a “human science” consultancy.
