= Vilhelm Pacht =

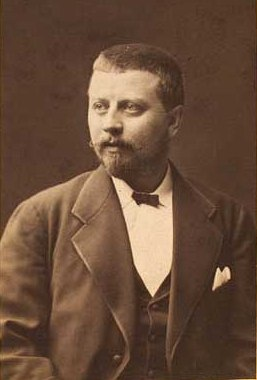
Vilhelm Pacht (1866)

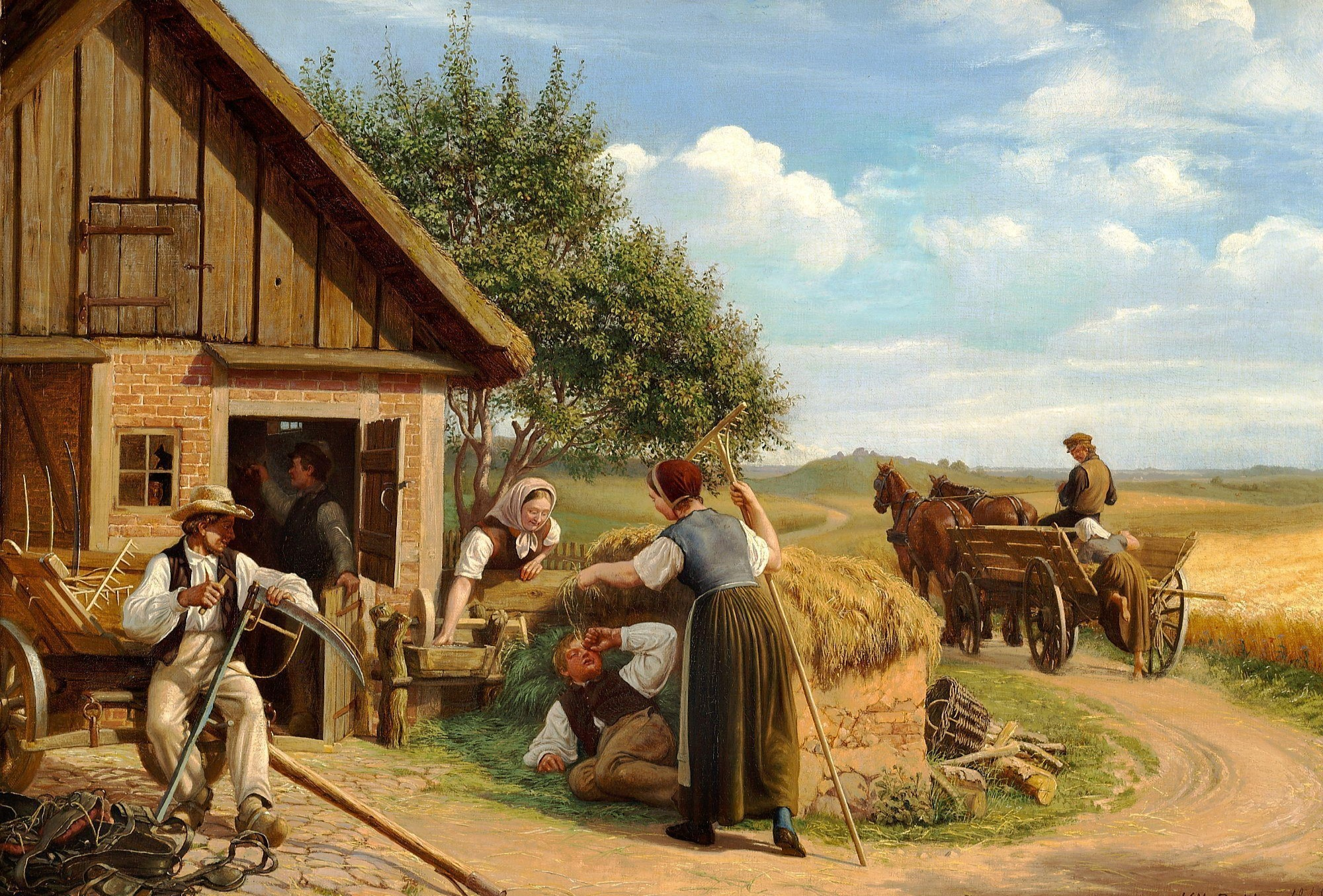
An interrupted nap (1868)

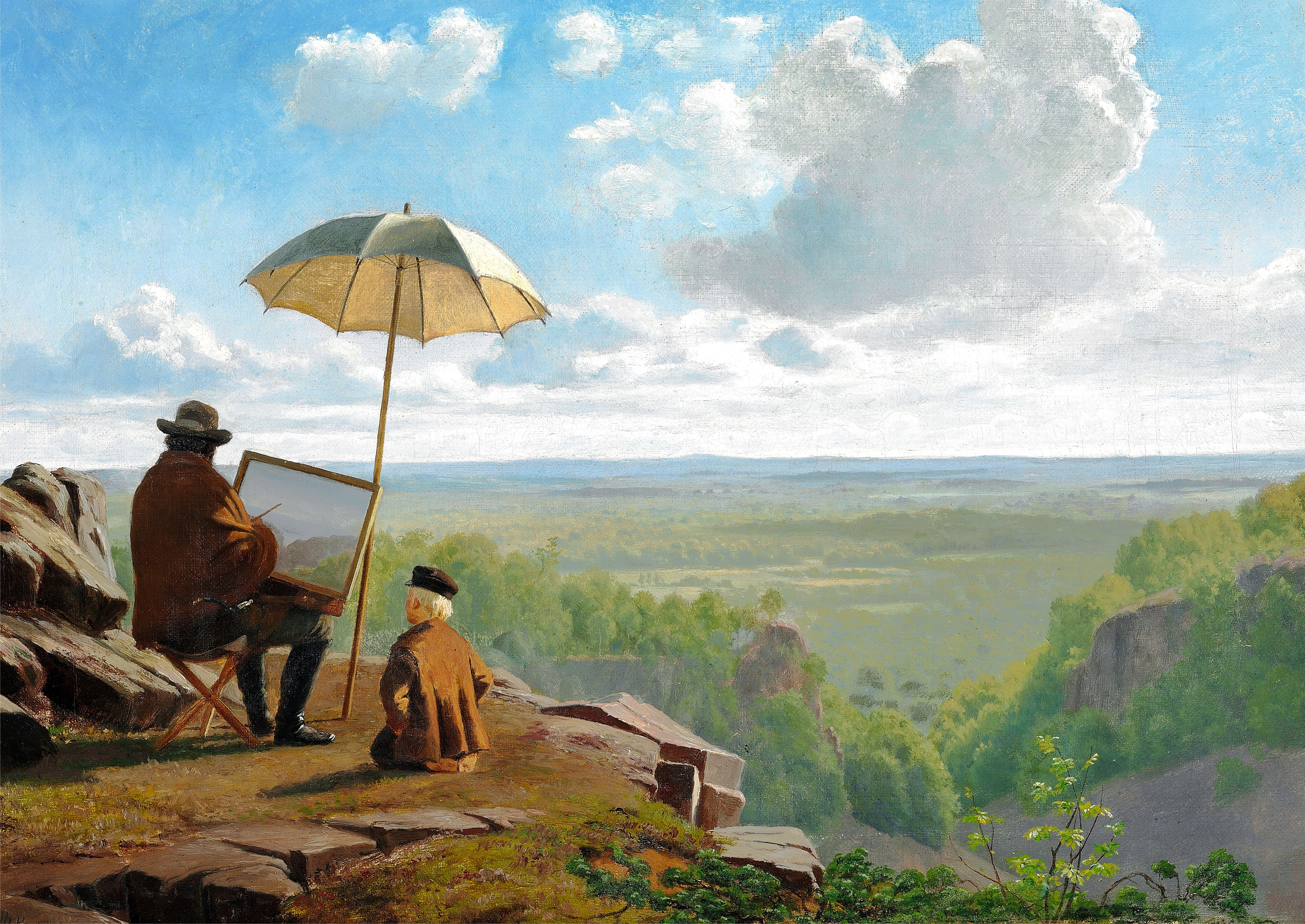
Early morning in Skäralid in Skåne (1882)

Lauritz Vilhelm Pacht (23 November 1843 – 20 May 1912) was a Danish genre painter, industrialist and philanthropist.

== Biography ==
Pacht was born in Copenhagen, Denmark. He was the son of Laurids Adolph Pacht (1819–1868) and Marie Caroline Jürgensen (b. 1823). His father was a book binder and cap maker. After his confirmation, he began to learn printing, but was later apprenticed to a marble chipper. While taking classes at the Copenhagen Technical College, his drawings attracted the attention of G.F. Hetsch (1788–1864, who advised him to take up porcelain painting. After completing his courses, he was given a position at the Royal Porcelain Factory, which he held from 1862 to 1867.

Beginning in 1861, he also attended classes at the Royal Danish Academy of Fine Arts; passing his final exam in 1866. He began to have showings at the Charlottenborg Spring Exhibition and in 1869 was awarded the Neuhausenske Prize (De Neuhausenske Præmier)

For several years, he worked to perfect a method to improve the reproduction of drawings by printing press. In 1872, he received a patent for his processes and set up a workshop for what he called the "Heliotype" (a process similar to hectography).

In 1880, he joined with the photographer, Hilmar Crone, to create "Pacht & Crones Illustrationsetablissement". Pacht left the company in 1885 and was replaced by the drawing teacher, Giovannino von Huth. That same year, Pacht started the "Skandinavisk Panoptikon", a combination wax museum and cabinet of curiosities.

In 1887, he opened a factory that produced intaglio ink and paint tubes. In 1890, the company went public as an aktieselskab called the "Danske Bogtrykkeres Farvefabrik", but he continued as General Manager.

In 1896, he presented the first moving pictures in Denmark in a wooden structure called the "Panorama" at the square in front of Copenhagen City Hall. His building and equipment were lost to a suspicious fire, but he soon re-established his shows (renamed the "Kineoptikon") at his Panoptikon.

His activities made him a wealthy man, but also ensured that his output as a painter was rather small.

Just before his death, he and his second wife, Oline Kristine Marie Olsen (1868-1928), created the Vilhelm Pacht Foundation (Vilhelm Pachts Kunstnerboligs Legat) which awarded scholarships to artists and which turned his mansion, "Pachts Bo", into housing for indigent artists. He died in 1912 at Holte.
