= Joseph-Frédéric-Benoît Charrière =

French inventor (1803–1876)

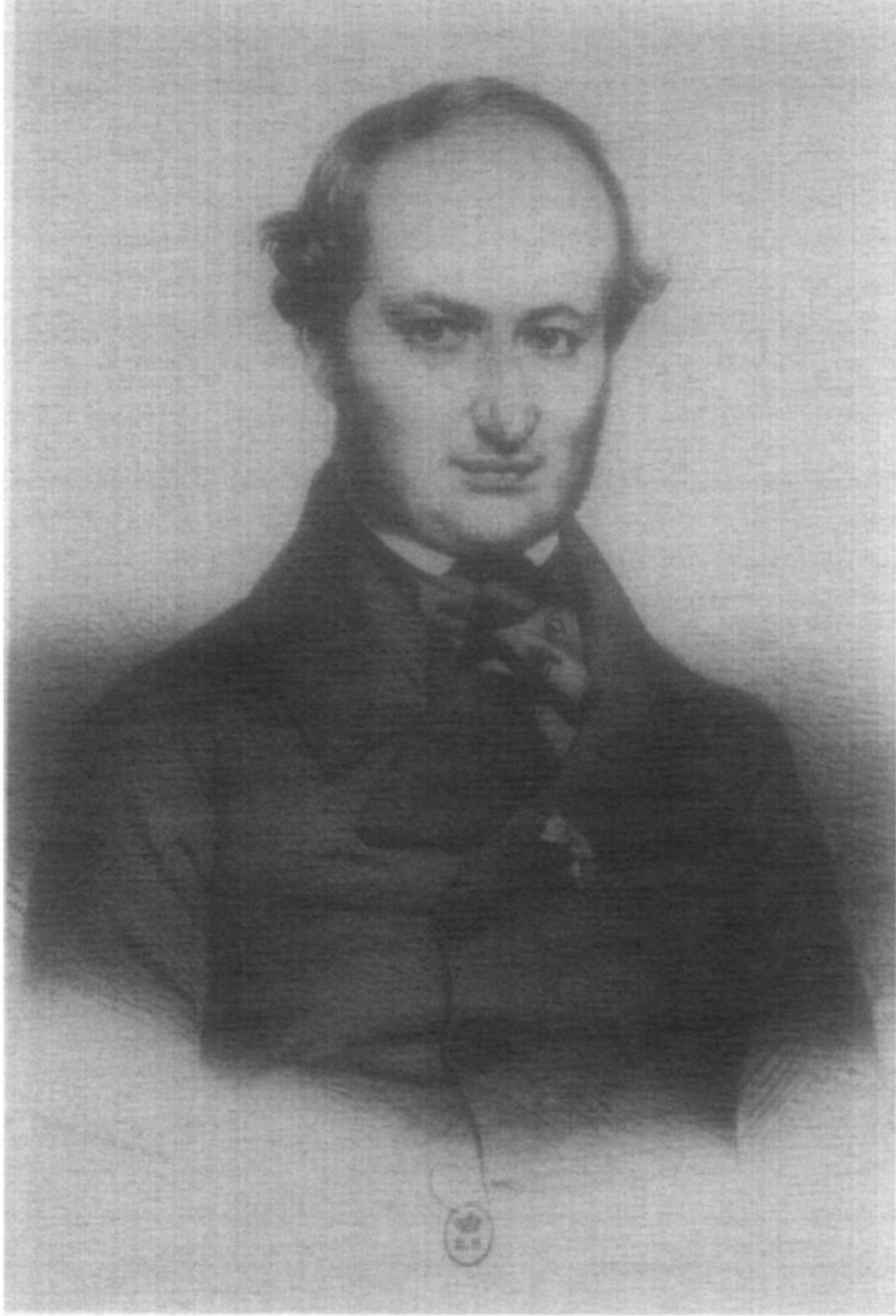
Joseph-Frédéric-Benoît Charrière

Joseph-Frédéric-Benoît Charrière (March 19, 1803 – April 28, 1876) was a Swiss-born French manufacturer of surgical instruments.

Charrière was born in Cerniat, in the Canton of Fribourg, Switzerland. He moved to Paris at age 13, and was apprenticed to a manufacturer of knives. In 1820, he founded a company manufacturing surgical instruments, which quickly grew to 400 employees by around 1840, and was world-famous by his death. He became a naturalized French citizen in 1843.

He developed and improved a number of instruments, especially hypodermic needles and catheters; the French catheter scale is named after his work. In order to achieve this, Charrière benefitted from at the time newly developed materials such as nickel silver, stainless steel, and rubber.

Several of his apprentices also became well-known instrument makers, including Georges-Guillaume-Amatus Lüer, Louis-Joseph Mathieu, and Adolphe Collin in Paris; Josef Leiter in Vienna; and Camillus Nyrop in Copenhagen.

He was inducted into the Legion of Honour in 1851, and died in 1876 in Paris.

== Measuring unit ==
His name is used as a measuring unit for the outer diameter and the general size of urological instruments, endoscopes and catheters for various purposes (1 Charrière = 1 mm outer circumference ~ 1/3 mm outer diameter). In English-speaking countries, the name "Charrière" was found difficult to pronounce. Thus, the term "French" was rapidly adopted in its stead. This is now generally used as a measuring unit for medical catheters and introducers (1 French = 1/3 mm).
