= French catheter scale =

French standard of catheter sizes

The French scale, also known as the French gauge or Charrière system, is a widely used measurement system for the size of catheters. It is commonly abbreviated as Fr but may also be abbreviated as Fg, FR or F, and less frequently as CH or Ch (referencing its inventor, Charrière). However, the term gauge, abbreviated G or ga, typically refers to the Birmingham gauge for hypodermic needles.

The French scale measures and is proportional to the outer diameter of a catheter, with 1 French (Fr) defined as 1/3 millimeter, making the relationship: 1 mm = 3 Fr. Thus, the outer diameter of a catheter in millimeters can be calculated by dividing the French size by 3. For example, a catheter with a French size of 9 would have an outer diameter of approximately 3 mm.

While the French scale aligns closely with the metric system, it introduces the potential for rounding errors when sizes are erroneously treated as being about the circumference. This metrication problem is further complicated in medical contexts where imperial units are used (interchangeably with metric units or not).

Unlike the Birmingham gauge, where larger gauge numbers indicate smaller diameters, an increasing French size corresponds to a larger outer diameter.

The French scale measures the outer diameter of the catheter, not the size of the internal drainage channel (inner diameter). For instance, a two-way catheter of 20 Fr and a three-way catheter of 20 Fr have the same outer diameter, but the three-way catheter has an additional channel for irrigation, reducing the size of its drainage channel.

The French gauge system was devised by Joseph-Frédéric-Benoît Charrière, a 19th-century Parisian surgical instrument maker.

== Size correspondence ==
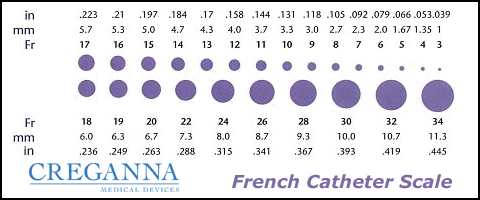
French catheter scale

French gauge	Circumference (mm)	Outer diameter	
French gauge	Circumference (mm)	(mm)	(inches)
1	1.05	0.33	0.01
2	2.09	0.67	0.03
3	3.14	1.00	0.04
4	4.19	1.33	0.05
5	5.24	1.67	0.07
6	6.28	2.00	0.08
7	7.33	2.33	0.09
8	8.38	2.67	0.10
9	9.42	3.00	0.12
10	10.47	3.33	0.13
11	11.52	3.67	0.14
12	12.57	4.00	0.16
13	13.61	4.33	0.17
14	14.66	4.67	0.18
15	15.71	5.00	0.20
16	16.76	5.33	0.21
17	17.80	5.67	0.22
18	18.85	6.00	0.24
19	19.90	6.33	0.25
20	20.94	6.67	0.26
21	21.99	7.00	0.28
22	23.04	7.33	0.29
23	24.09	7.67	0.30
24	25.13	8.00	0.31
25	26.18	8.33	0.33
26	27.23	8.67	0.34
27	28.27	9.00	0.35
28	29.32	9.33	0.37
29	30.37	9.67	0.38
30	31.42	10.00	0.39
31	32.46	10.33	0.41
32	33.51	10.67	0.42
33	34.56	11.00	0.43
34	35.60	11.33	0.45
35	36.65	11.67	0.46

== See also ==
- American wire gauge
- Birmingham gauge
