= Vilhelm Prior =

Danish book dealer and publisher

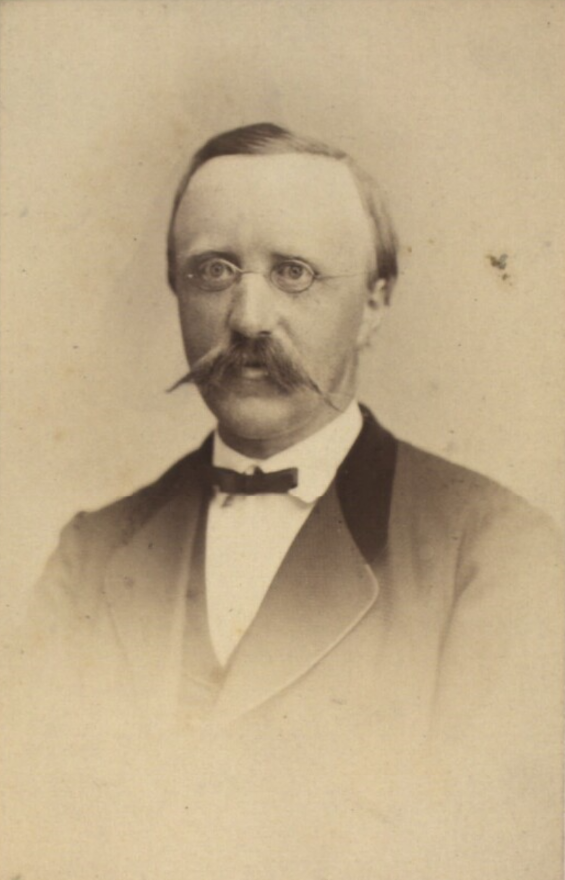
- Photograph of Vilhelm Prior
- Born: 10 April 1835; Vandborg, Denmark
- Died: 20 May 1910 (aged 75); Copenhagen, Copenhagen
- Occupation: Bookseller

Vilhelm Prior (10 April 1835 - 20 May 1910) was a Danish book dealer and publisher. He was awarded the title book dealer to the Greek court in 1876 and to the Danish court in 1906. His book shop was from 1875 based at Købmagergade 52 in Copenhagen.

== Early life and education ==
Prior was born on 10 April 1835 at Mølgård in Vandborg Parish, west of Lemvig, the son of chaplain in Hundstrup Andreas Peter Prior (1805–97) and Hansine Vilhelmine Eller (1809–69). His father would later serve as parish priest in Nors and Tved. His father was after the mother's death married second time to Torbine Stenbrygger (1837-1915) in 1871.

He received his first schooling at home and in the local village school. In 1949 Prior and his elder brother were sent to Copenhagen where they lived with schoolmaster H. E. Melchior and attended his school (Melchiors Borgerskole). He began an apprenticeship in J. H. Bings Etablissement in 1850 and was later educated as a book dealer abroad in 1855–59.

== Career ==
Back in Copenhagen, in 1859, Prior established a book shop at Købmagergade 49. After a difficult start it grew to considerable size. Prior was also active as a book publisher, specializing in school books. He was also active in the market for commissions from other book dealers, not least from Norway. When in 1894 the book commission market was centralized in a united commission facility (fælles kommissionsanstalt), Prior was the only book dealer to not enter this partnership.

Prior moved his business to larger premises at Købmagergade 52 in 1875. In 1876 he was appointed as Greek court book dealer by the Danish-born George I of Greece and in 1907 also as Danish court book dealer.

He was from 1863 a member of the Copenhagen Bookdealers Association. Propr's son Aage Prior (14 November 1866 - 3 February 1936) became a partner in 1900 and the sole owner of the firm in 1910.

== Personal life ==
Prior married Anna Maria Wørmer (13 February 1844 - 1 March 8.1890), a daughter of lighthouse manager Heinrich Julius W. (1805–76) and Aurelia Katrine Gesner (1811–82), on 14 August 1864 in Hønsted Church.

Prior became a Knight in the Order of the Dannebrog in 1909. He died on 20 May 1910 in Copenhagen and is buried in Assistens Cemetery.
