= HBK Investments =

Investment management firm

- Type: Private company
- Industry: Investment management
- Founded: 1991
- Founder: Harlan B. Korenvaes
- Headquarters: Dallas, Texas
- Key people: David Costen Haley President and Managing Director John Baker Gentry Managing Director and Chief Financial Officer Mr. Kevin Alan O'Neal Managing Director and Chief Operating Officer
- AUM: $35.6 billion (regulatory AUM, June 2026)
- Number of employees: 198 (2026)
- Website: www.hbk.com

HBK Investments (or HBK Capital Management) is a global, multi-strategy alternative investment management firm based in Dallas, Texas. In its Form ADV filed in June 2026, it reported regulatory assets under management of about $35.6 billion and 198 employees. In addition to its main office in Dallas, the firm has offices in New York, Charlottesville, Virginia, and London. Since inception in 1991, HBK's funds have delivered annualized returns of approximately 11.6%, net of fees.

The firm takes its name from the initials of Harlan B. Korenvaes, former Managing Director of Merrill Lynch in charge of the firm's convertible arbitrage trading and sales. He left Merrill Lynch and founded HBK in October 1991, starting with $30 million in capital from four limited partners, including Richard Rainwater, David Geffen, the Ziff family, and the Burden family, heirs to the Vanderbilt fortune. Korenvaes retired from HBK in 2003 to run his family office, Korenvaes Capital.

In mid-2007 HBK's assets peaked at $14.06 billion, making it one of the largest hedge funds in the world, though it subsequently suffered heavy redemptions during and following the Great Recession.

In 2015, Institutional Investor/Alpha magazine gave HBK an A grade and the #13 ranking among hedge funds worldwide.
