= Cornelius Knudsen =

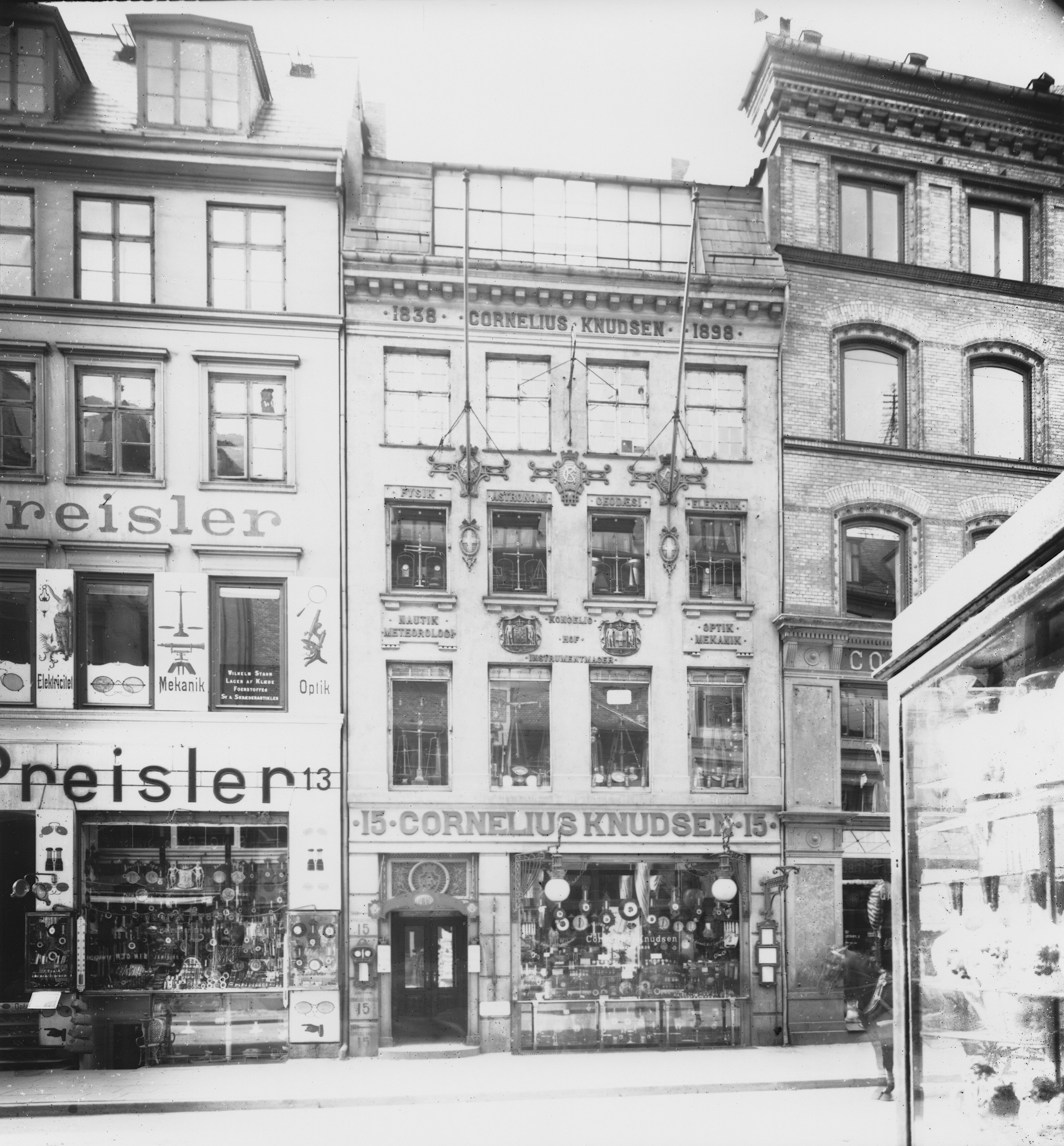
Cornelius Knudsen's building at Købmagergade 15 photographed by Peter Elfelt in 1905

Cornelius Knudsen was a manufacturer of scientific instruments based in Copenhagen, Denmark. The company gained an international reputation and its instruments were used on a number of polar expeditions.

== History ==
The company was founded on 10 March 1838 by Jens Cornelius Knudsen (f1807-1879). The company was initially based on Gråbrødretorv but relocated to a building at the corner of Købmagergade and Løvstræde in 1845.

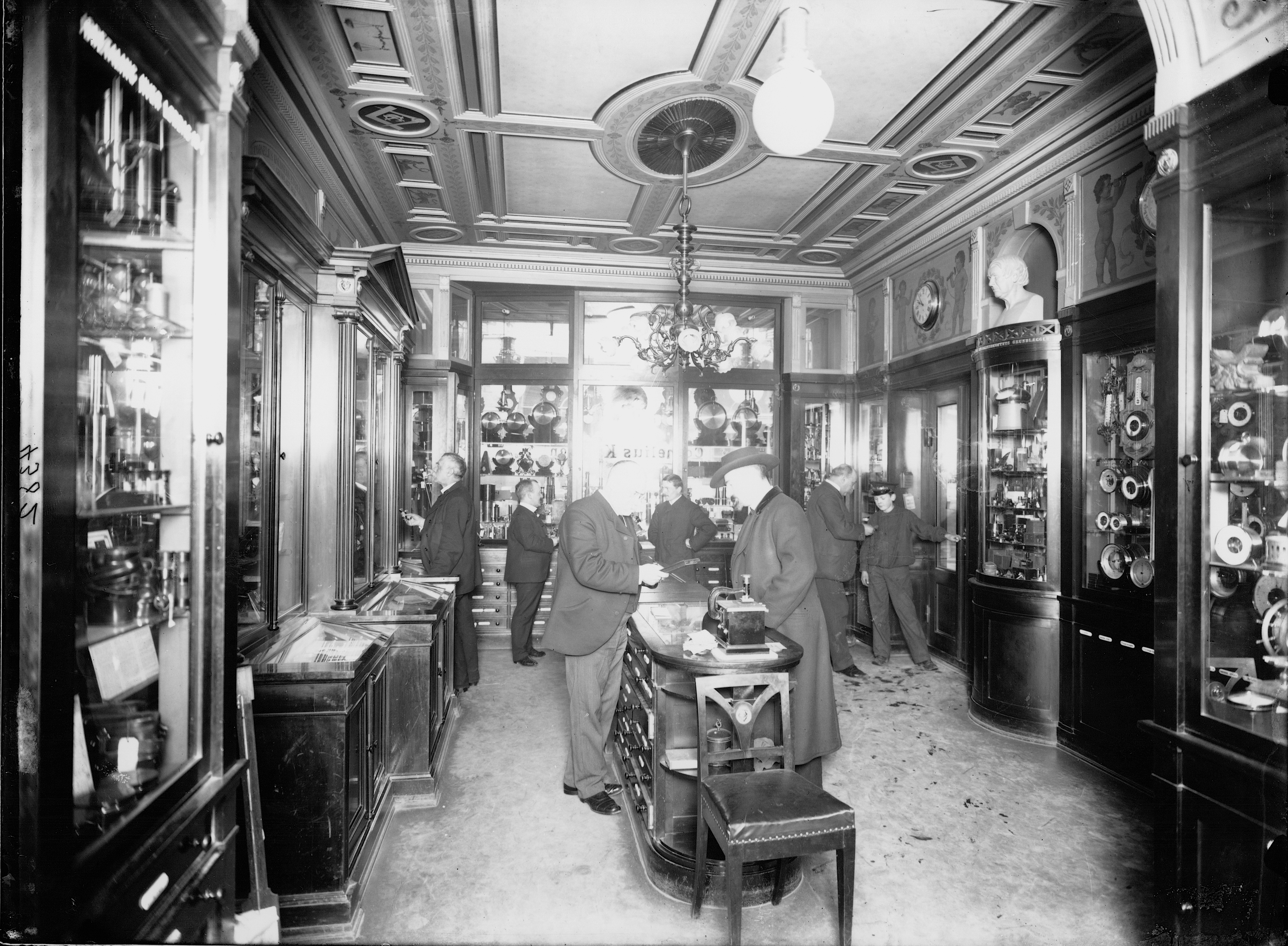
The shop at Købmagergade 15, 1904

Knudsen's son Theodor Valdemar Cornelius Knudsen (1844-) served as a cadet on the corvetette Heimdal in 1860. He formed a friendship with Prince Wilhelm, the later George I of Greece, who also served as a cadet on the ship. Back on land, he initially worked in his father's workshop and then attended classes at the College of Advanced Technology. He headed the family firm from 1870 and continued it alone after his father's death. On 27 May 1884, he changed his last name to Cornelius-Knudsen.

Cornelius-Knudsen's sons Aage Cornelius Knudsen (1879-) and Jens Cornelius Knudsen (1885-) were assistant directors from 1905 and 1908. The company was in 1950 owned by Anna Cornelius-Knudsen (1909-).

== Location ==
The company was from 1895 based at Købmagergade 15. The old building was replaced by a new Domus Optica in 1946-1947. It was constructed to a Functionalist design by Svenn Eske Kristensen.

== Products ==
The product range comprised optical, navigational, and surveying instruments, planimeters and equipment for telegraphy.

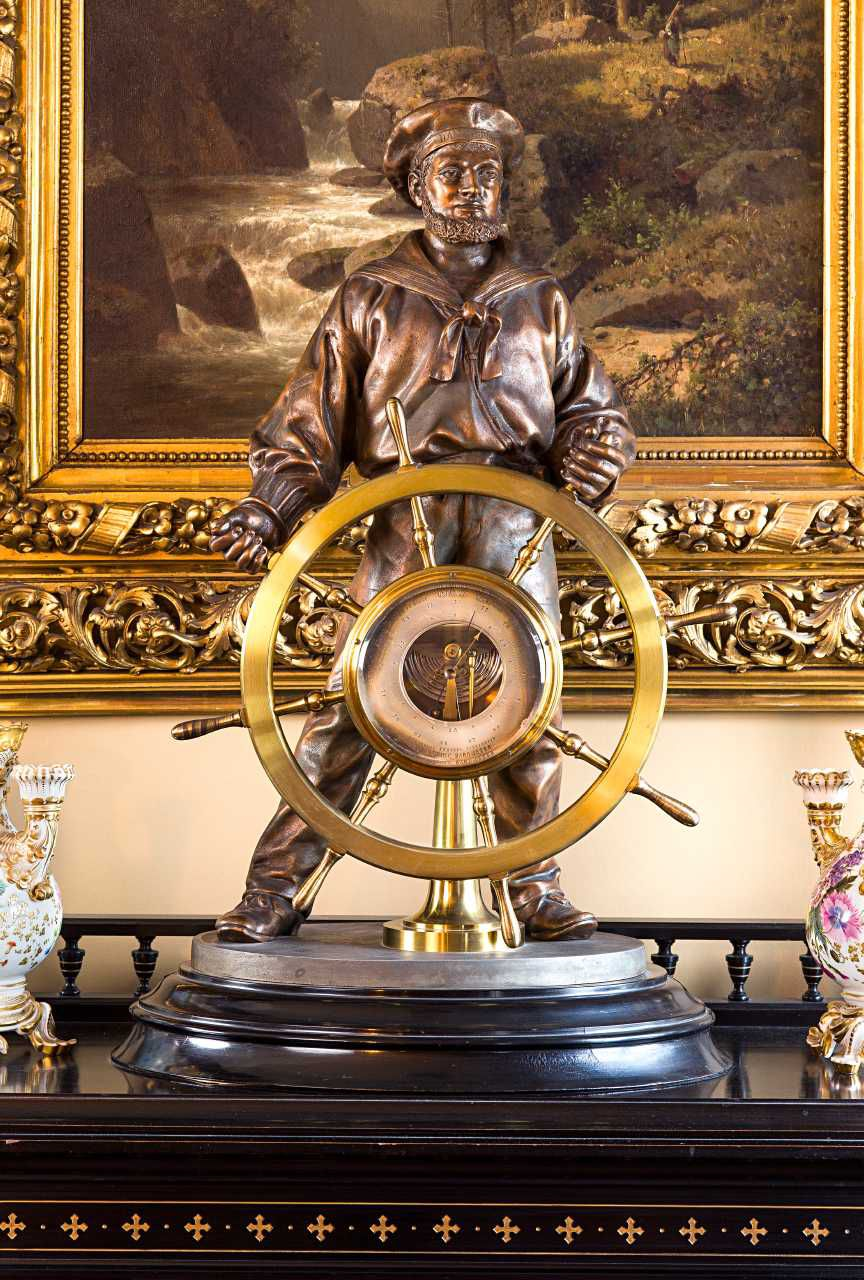
A Cornelius Knudsen barometer in the National Museum of Denmark's "Victorian Apartment" at Frederiksholms Kanal 15-17

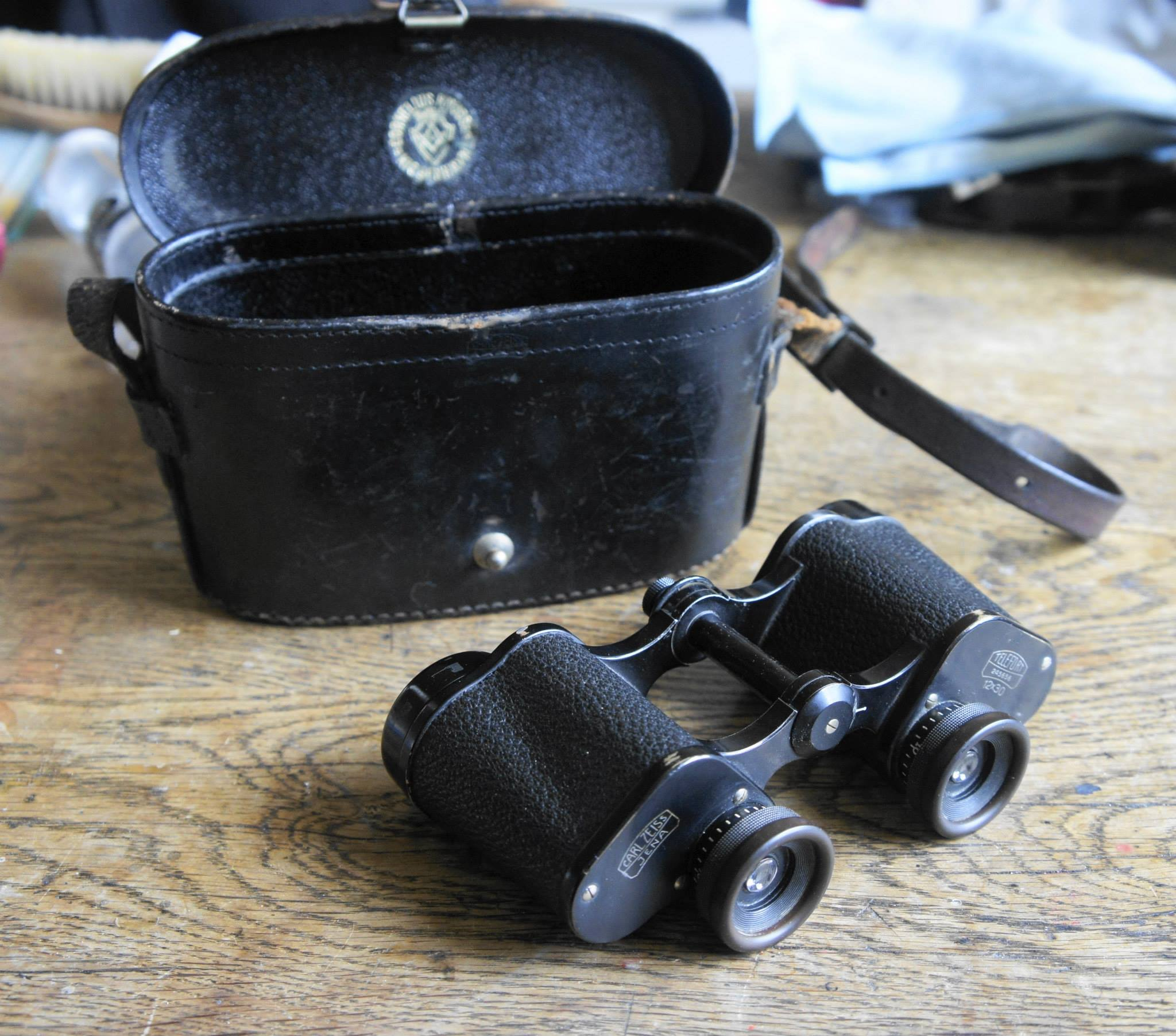
Cornelius Knudsen Zeiss Telefort
