= Erik Amdrup =

Danish professor of surgery, doctor and author

- Born: 21 February 1923
- Died: 22 February 1998 (aged 75)
- Occupations: Surgeon, professor, author
- Known for: Work on peptic ulcers, gastroenterological surgery, crime novels
- Notable work: Hilsen fra Hans, Renters rente, Kirurgisk gastroenterologi

Erik Amdrup (born 21 February 1923 in Visby, Tønder, Denmark, died 22 February 1998) was a Danish professor of surgery, doctor, and author.

From 1965, Amdrup was assistant head doctor at Københavns Kommunehospital, from 1971 to 1988 he was head of gastroenterological surgery at Århus kommunehospital and professor of surgery at Århus Universitet. His work on peptic ulcers and surgical treatment of these won international acclaim. He was active in research at the Institutt for Eksperimentell Klinisk Forskning at Århus Universitet, and was the institute's leader for a time.

Aged 56, Amdrup made in his debut in 1979 as a fiction author with the crime novel Hilsen fra Hans. Many of his novels were acclaimed as the year's best Danish crime novel. The novel Renters rente was filmed as a Danish TV series in 1996.

== Bibliography ==
- Dumpingsyndromet og andre måltidsbestemte gener optrædende hos ventriceresecerde patienter – non-fiction (1960)
- Kirurgisk gastroenterologi. En klinisk indføring – non-fiction (1978)
- Hilsen fra Hans (1979)
- Den næste (1981)
- Hvem førte kniven? (1983)
- Muldvarpen (1983)
- Trappen med de tretten trin (1984)
- Uansøgt afsked (1984)
- Arme riddere (1985)
- Mistænkt – children's novel (1985)
- Skybrud (1986)
- Rene af hjertet (1987)
- Stemmen og ansigtet – children's novel (1987)
- Studies on peptic ulcer disease in department of surgery 1, Kommunehospitalet Cophenhagen – non-fiction (1987)
- Lucifers lov (1988)
- Ude i tovene (1989)
- Renters rente (1989)
- Nat på stationen (1990)
- Norden for lands lov (1991)
- Oh - at styre! (1991)
- Virtuosen (1992)
- Tro, håb og nederlag (1993)
- Angstens ansigt og andre historier (1994)
- Fæstningen (1995)
- Autonom (1996)
- den andens brød (1997)
- Som jeg så det. En kirurgs tilbageblik – non-fiction (1998)
- I skygge (1998)

== Prizes ==
- De gyldne håndjern (awarded by the Poe-klubben of Denmark) 1984, for Hvem førte kniven
- De gyldne håndjern 1985, for Uansøgt afsked
- Palle Rosenkrantz-prisen 1989, for Renters rente

Preceded by Leif Davidsen	Winner of the Palle Rosenkrantz-prisen; 1989	Succeeded by Gunnar Staalesen
