= Mølleparken =

Park in Aarhus, Denmark

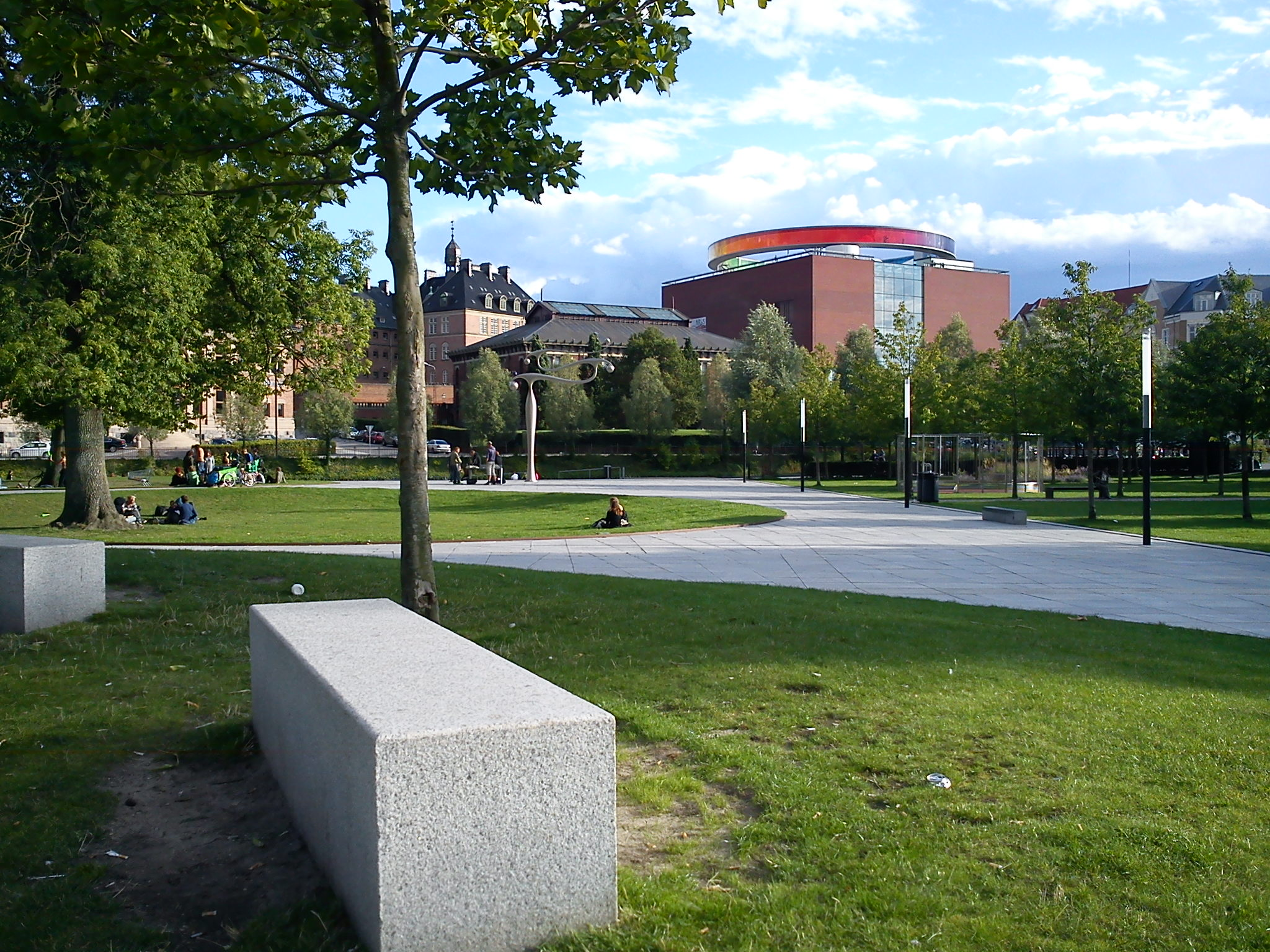
- Mølleparken with ARoS Art Museum in the background.
- Interactive map of Mølleparken
- Type: Urban park
- Location: Aarhus, Denmark
- Coordinates: 56°09′21.6″N 10°12′01.2″E
- Created: 1926 with several later reconstructions
- Owner: Aarhus Municipality

Mølleparken (lit. 'The Mill Park') is a park in the city of Aarhus located in Midtbyen. Mølleparken was constructed in 1926 where the, by then obsolete, mills of the city had been situated by the river since 1289. Today the park lies by the Aarhus River and the ARoS Art Museum and functions as a section of a pedestrian arterial from ARoS to the Latin Quarter.

Mølleparken was extensively redesigned in 2006–2008, as part of the opening of the Aarhus River and now contains large areas for public recreation and facilities for street sports, including basketball, panna, table tennis and concrete board game tables for playing chess, backgammon and checkers.

Eleven busts of notable Danish authors line the northern section of the park, namely Steen Steensen Blicher, Marie Bregendahl, J. P. Jacobsen, Johannes V. Jensen, Jakob Knudsen, Thøger Larsen, Jacob Paludan, Henrik Pontoppidan, Johan Skjoldborg, Harry Søiberg and Jeppe Aakjær. The bronze sculpture of "Elskovskampen" (lit. 'the lovemaking battle') by Johannes Berg from the original park is still on display and in 2014, the kinetic sculpture Snake by Phil Price was placed here too, after acquisition by the city council. The council bought the sculpture after it received the highest rating from guests at the Sculpture by the Sea, Aarhus 2013 art festival in Tangkrogen.

== History ==
In 1289 Valdemar II ordered the construction of the first mill in the city by the river. The area was expanded with several small mills and an open area in conjunction with them was maintained up to the 17th century when it was substantially expanded with a garden. The mill was demolished in 1903 and in 1926 the area became publicly owned and shortly thereafter the park was inaugurated.

From 1934, Mølleparken contained the entrance to Aarhus main library—hence the authors' busts. The park has recently been heavily reconstructed and refurbished, finishing in 2014. In the summer of 2015 the library functions was moved to the newly constructed Dokk1 at the harbour front.

== Gallery ==
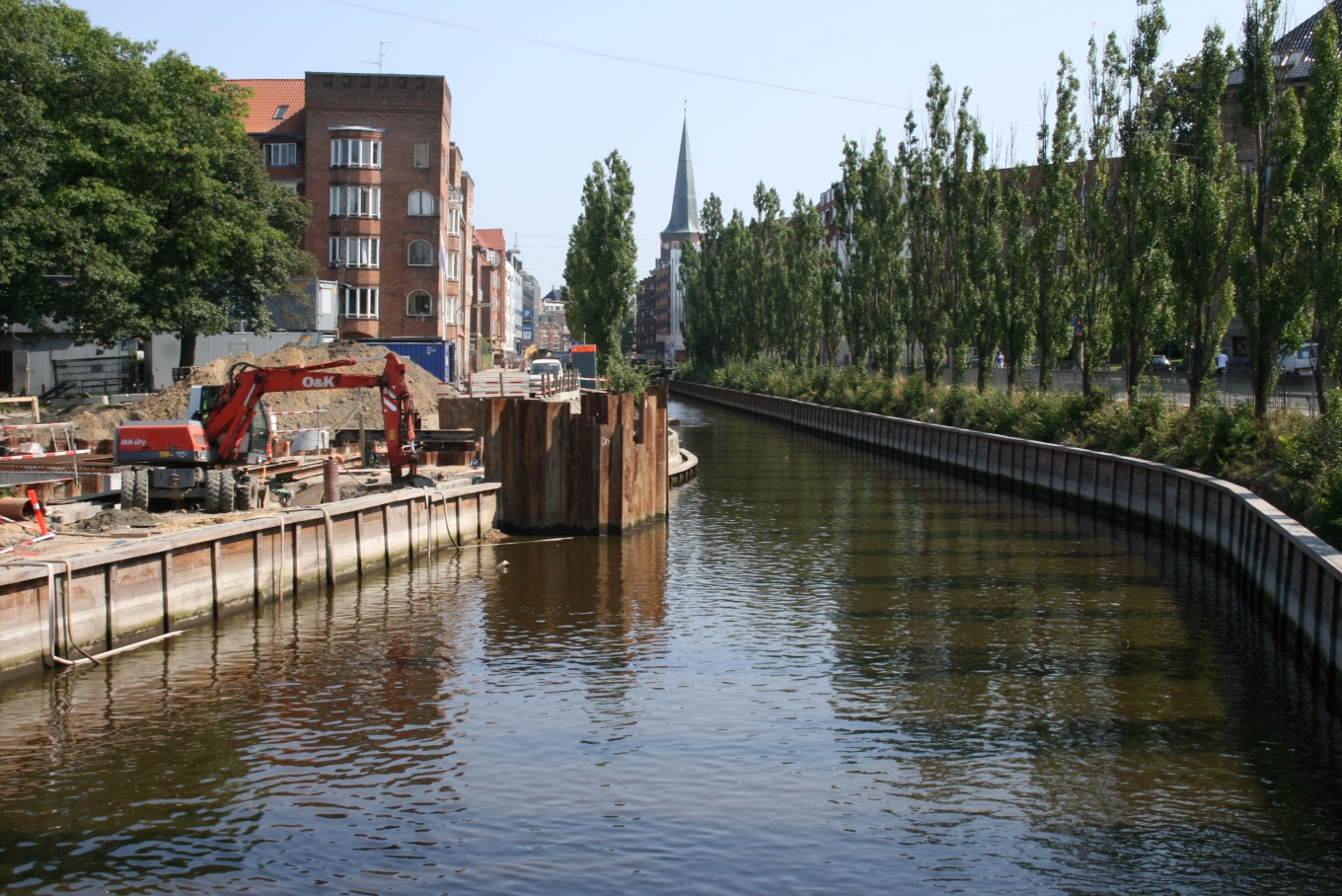
The opening of the river and construction at Mølleparken (2007)

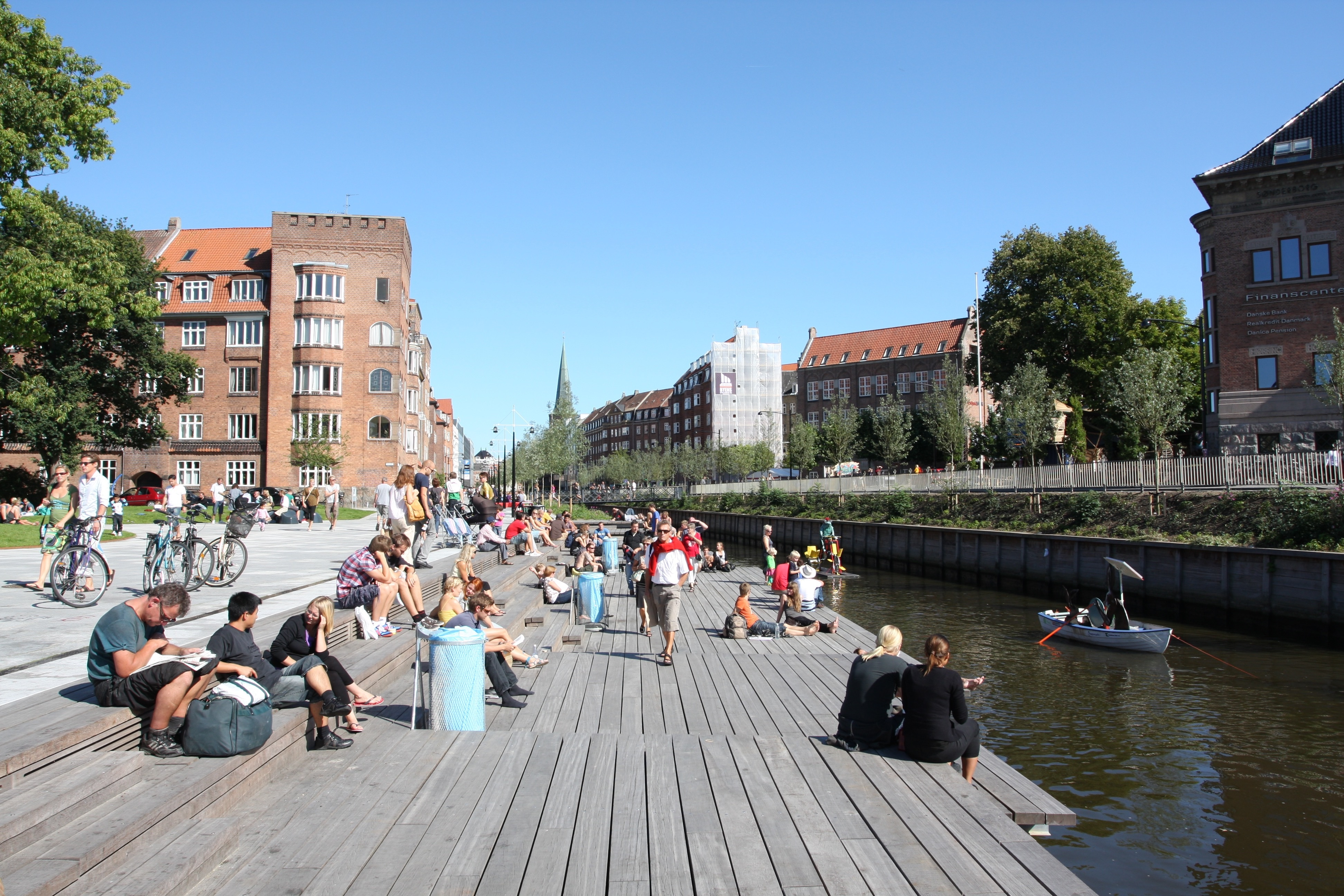
Recreational spot at the river after renovation (2008)

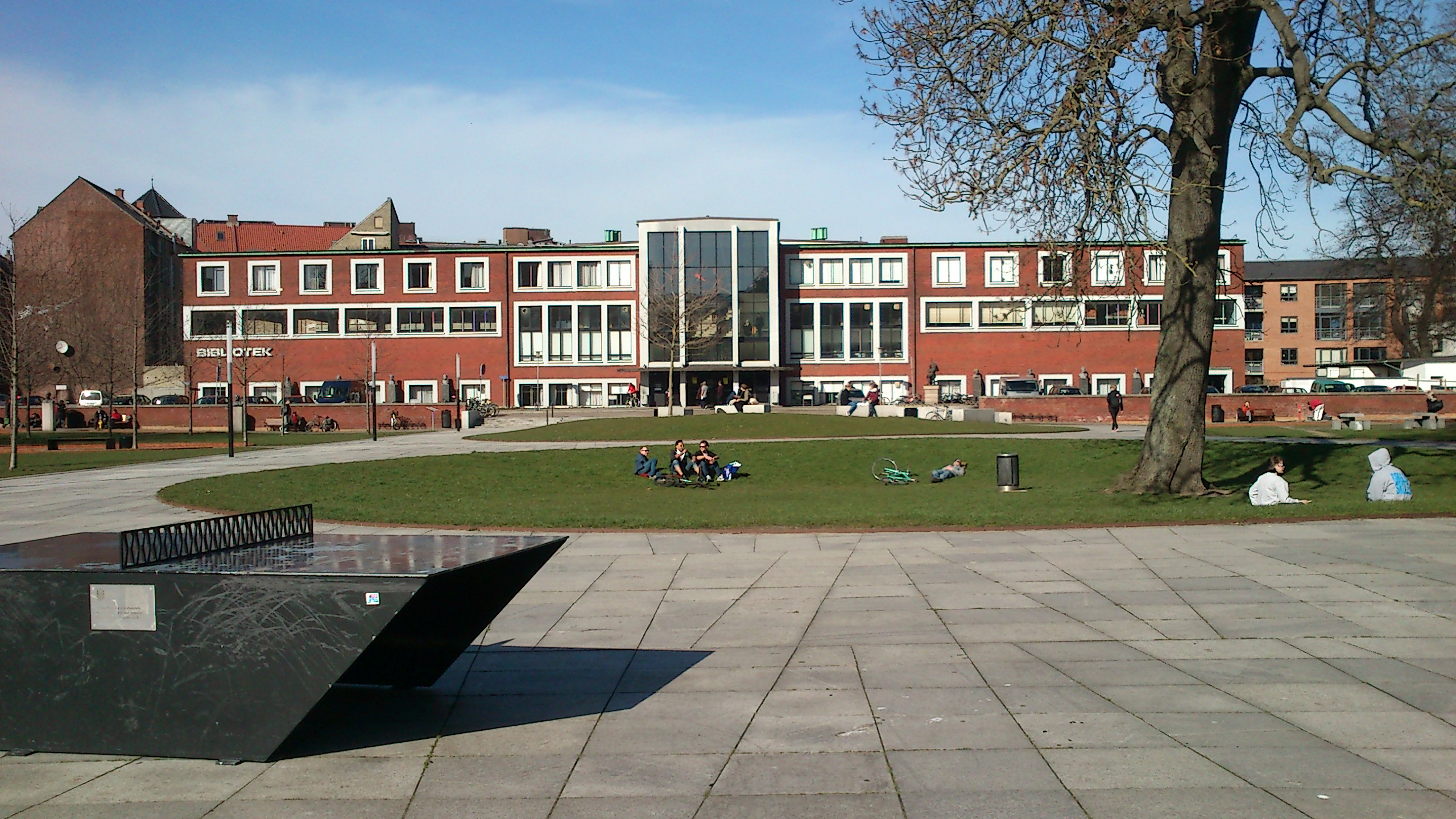
Table tennis with a view to the former main library in red brick

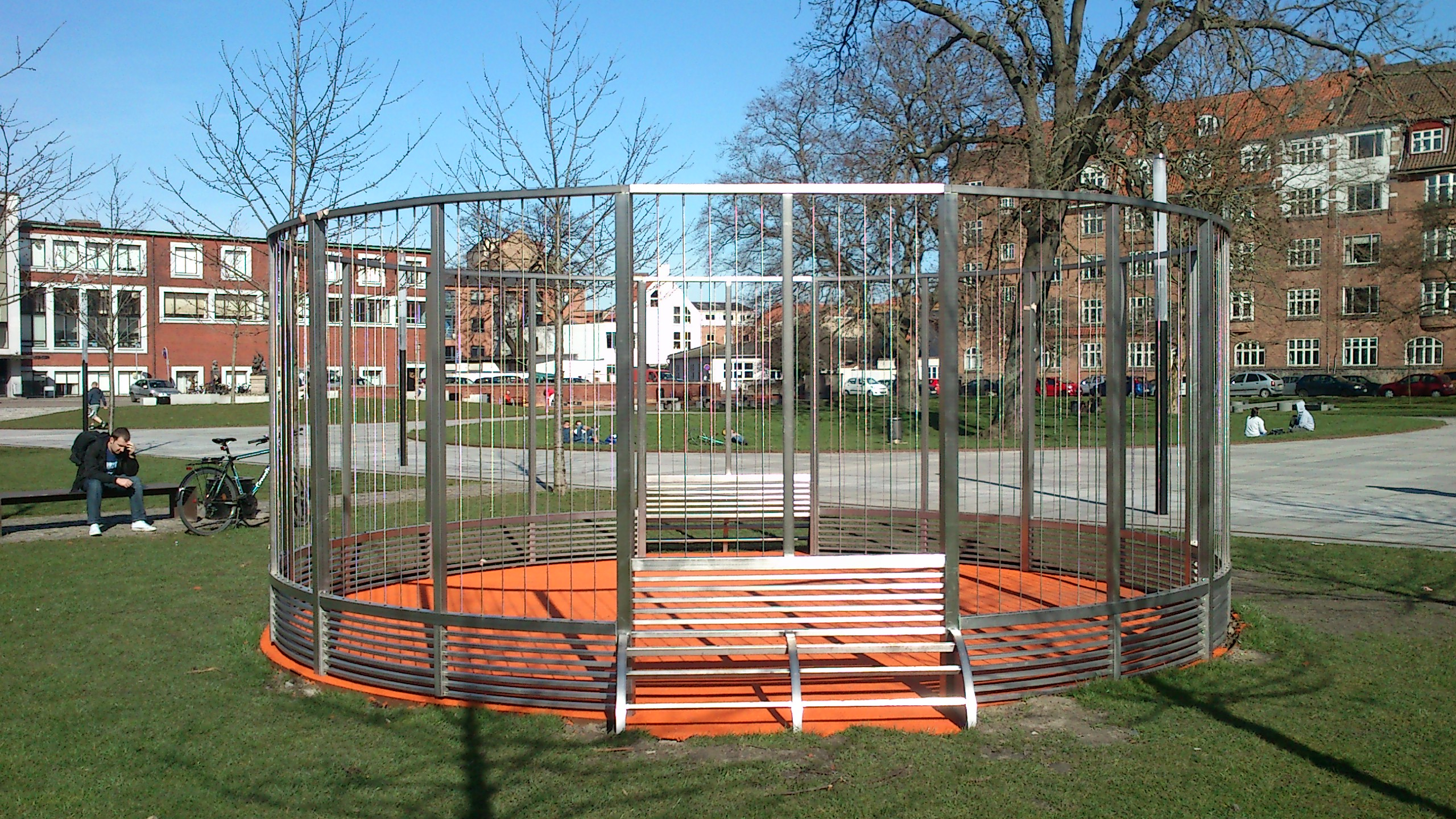
The panna cage

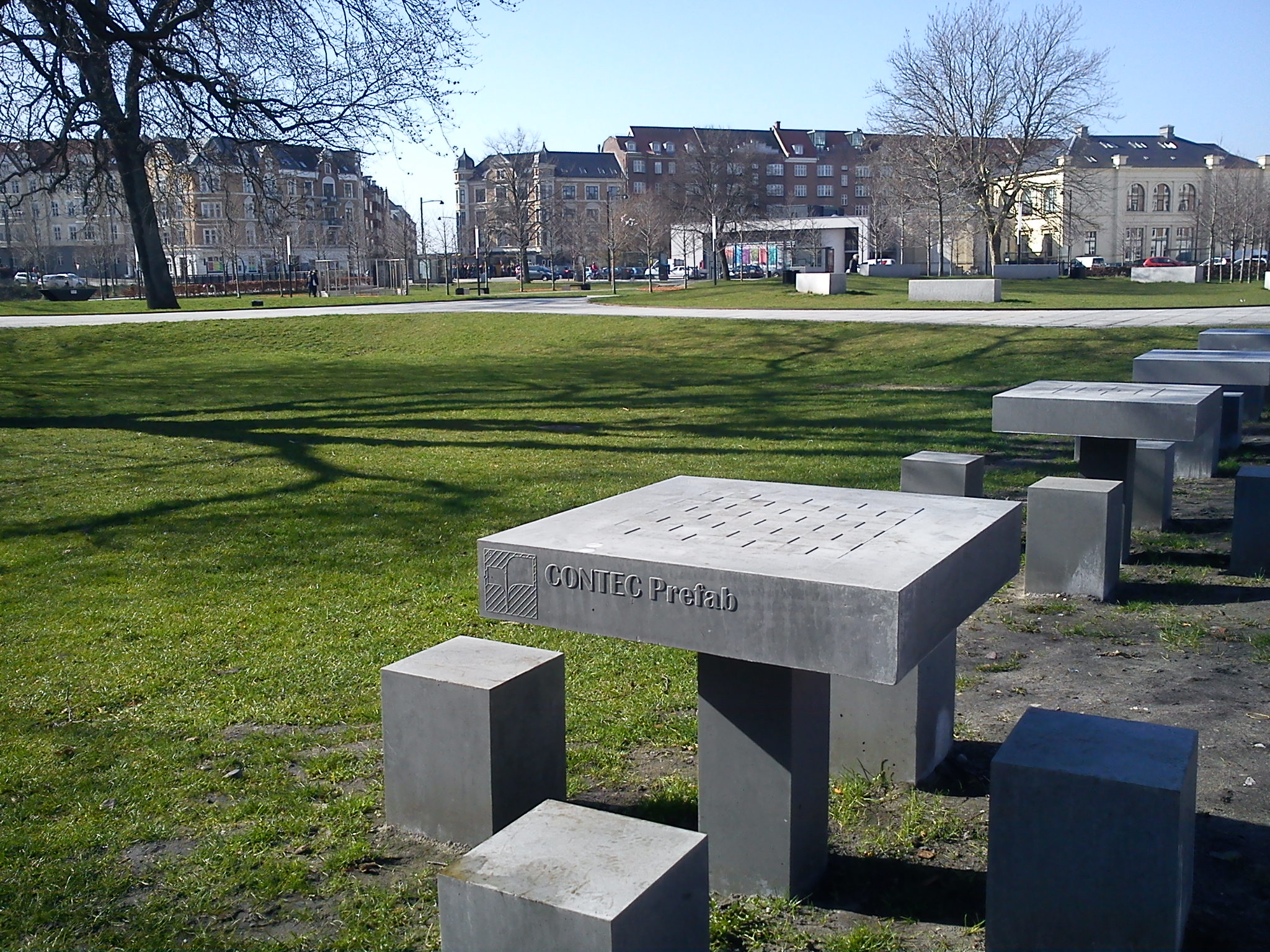
Board game tables in concrete

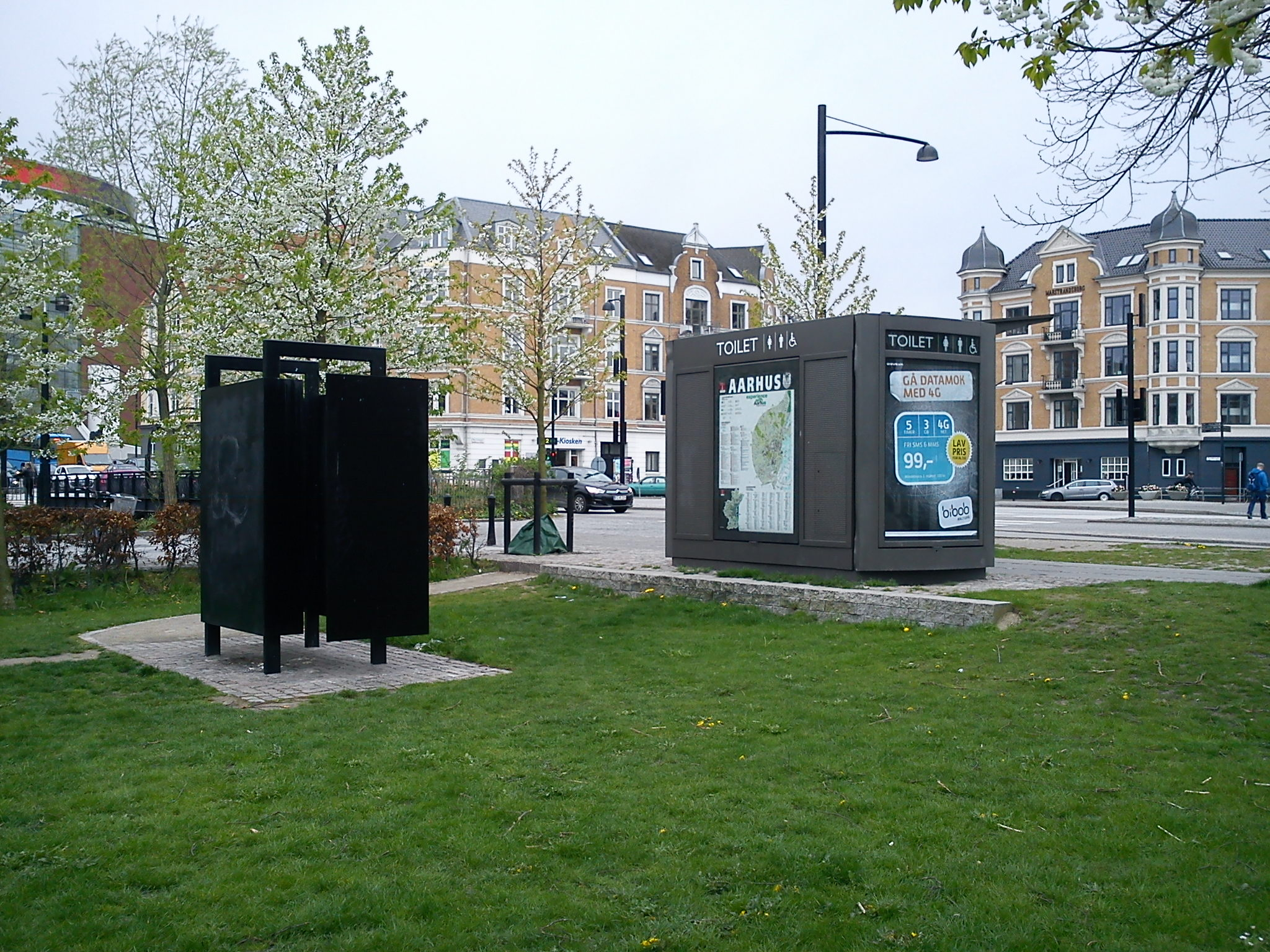
Public toilets

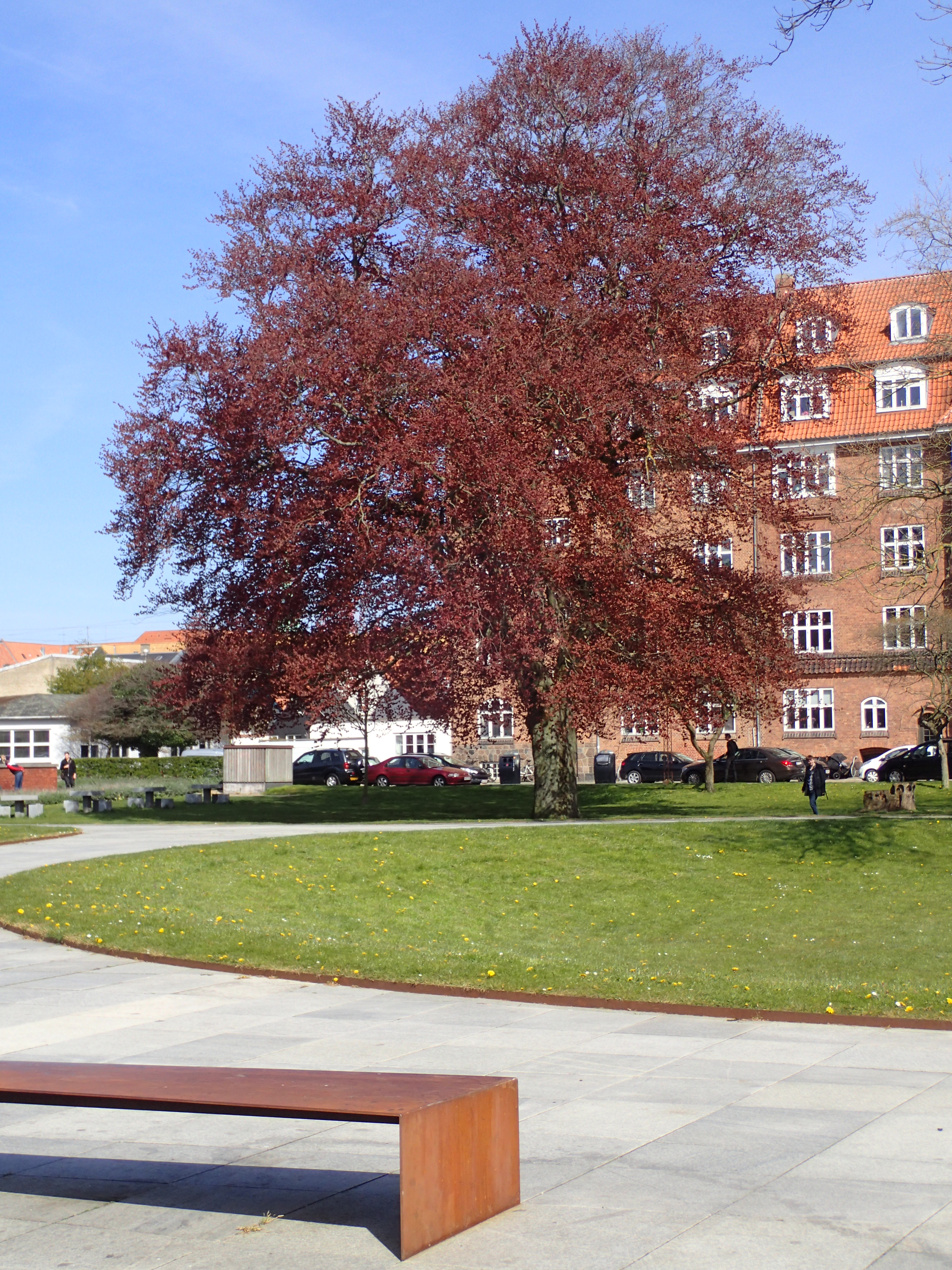
The large old Copper Beech
