= Limfjord =

Shallow part of the sea, located in Denmark

Coordinates: 56°56′34″N 9°04′30″E

Limfjorden at its narrowest section, in Aalborg

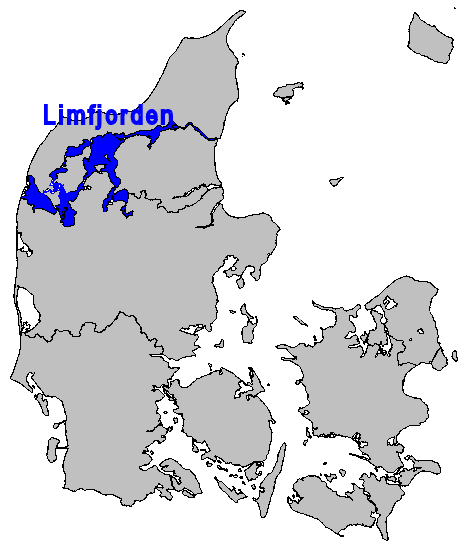
Location map of Limfjorden in Denmark. Note - the inlet from the North Sea is much narrower than this map implies

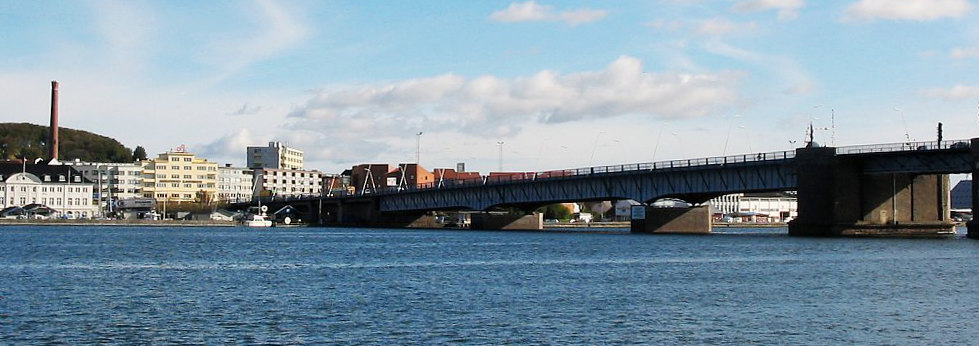
Limfjordsbroen (bridge) linking Aalborg and Nørresundby

The Limfjord (Danish: Limfjorden [ˈliːmˌfjoˀɐn], in northwest Jutlandish dialect: Æ Limfjord) is a shallow part of the sea, located in Denmark where it has been regarded as an inlet ever since Viking times. However, it now has entries both from the North Sea and Kattegat, and hence separates the North Jutlandic Island (Danish: Nørrejyske Ø, which includes the old provinces of Vendsyssel, Han herred and Thy) from the rest of the Jutland Peninsula. The Limfjord extends from Thyborøn Channel on the North Sea to Hals on the Kattegat. It is approximately 180 kilometres (111 miles) long and of an irregular shape with numerous bays, narrowings, and islands, most notably Mors, and the smaller ones Fur, Venø, Jegindø, Egholm and Livø. It is deepest at Hvalpsund (24 metres).

Its main port is Aalborg, where a railway bridge (Jernbanebroen over Limfjorden) and road bridge (Limfjordsbroen) have been built across the Limfjord to Nørresundby, while motorway E45 crosses it through a tunnel to the east. Commercial ports also exist at Thisted, Nykøbing Mors, Skive, Løgstør, Struer, Lemvig and Thyborøn. There are also bridges at Oddesund, Sallingsund, Vilsund, Aggersund and Sebbersund, and a number of ferry crossings.

== History ==
=== Western opening ===
From the early Middle Ages until 1825, the Limfjord was only open to the sea at its east end. In that year, the North Sea broke through from the west and created a second opening, turning the northern part of Jutland Vendsyssel-Thy into an island.

An isthmus of shifting sand had separated the Limfjord from the North Sea during historic times. The present inlet, Thyborøn Channel, has existed only since 1862. A passage also existed during the Viking Age. Based on place names and the geography, it is thought to have been to the south of the present one, between Ferring Sø (locally still called 'the Fjord') and Hygum Nor. Canute the Great sailed into it in 1027 on his way back from England. According to Saxo Grammaticus it closed at some time around 1200. There are records of several floods piercing the isthmus during the 16th to early 19th century.

On 3 February 1825 a flood pierced a permanent opening, the so-called Agger Channel, in the north of the 13 km long and less than 1 km wide isthmus, the Agger Tange, which had until then linked Thy with the rest of Jutland. The western part of North Jutland lost its road connection with mainland Jutland, but the towns and harbours in the western part of the Limfjord could benefit from becoming directly accessible from the North Sea, to the dismay of Aalborg. From the 1840s the western route became increasingly important, as Britain had opened for import of grain, and ships could return with British coal. However, the instability of Agger Channel made the towns of the western Limfjord look for a second option.

In 1862, a flood pierced another opening, the Thyborøn Channel, through the remainder of Agger Tange (see satellite image). Agger Channel was continuously filling with sand and eventually closed in 1877. Since then, the remaining Thyborøn Channel has been kept open and navigable by dredging. The harbour of Thyborøn was built in 1914–1918 and a town was founded. The two isthmuses have shifted eastwards since the 1800s. They have only been preserved by groynes, persistent sandpumping and two road dams along their inward (eastern) side.

=== Løgstør Banks and the Frederik VII Canal ===
At Løgstør, where the wide, western part of the Limfjord meets the narrow eastern section, the infamous sand banks of Løgstør Grunde were an obstacle to ships. Larger ships needed to be unloaded and reloaded when passing the banks. The Frederik VII Canal at Løgstør was completed in 1861 to allow for easier passage. Traffic had increased after the western opening at Thyborøn became navigable. The sand banks were finally dredged out in 1901, rendering the canal obsolete. The canal is now a well-preserved heritage site.

=== Plans for re-closing the western inlet ===
A 1946 act provided for re-closing the Channel with dams and sluices at Thyborøn, but this was never carried out. This idea re-emerged in 2005 and is now officially being investigated. It is thought that the isthmuses would be easier to preserve, and that the water level of the Limfjord would be more controllable. In periods of persistent western winds, flooding occurs on low-lying land and harbour areas in the towns of the western Limfjord, since the water cannot escape through the narrow, eastern part of the Limfjord.

Historically, a North Sea to Limfjord canal has also been proposed between Hanstholm harbour and Vejlerne (or Klitmøller and Thisted), e.g. by Jørgen Fibiger in 1933, the engineer behind the project of Hanstholm harbour.

== In literature ==
=== Limgrim legend ===
According to myth, a woman (in some versions a jötunn) gave birth to a pig, Limgrim, which soon grew so big that its bristles could be seen over the treetops. It strolled around and dug channels in the ground. One day it reached the sea and water broke in. This would have been at the eastern inlet of the Limfjord, at Hals. The legend is also handed down in a medieval ballad with a Christian tint. In the ballad, the pig is summoned to a thing by peasants to pay for the damage to their crops, and it is sentenced to the breaking wheel.

The state environmental surveillance vessel Limgrim, based at Skive, is named after the legend.

=== Limfjord poets ===
A number of writers of the Modern Breakthrough period (1870-1890) and the next decades came from the area around the Limfjord and often used it as a lyrical motif, or a setting for their prose. These include Jens Peter Jacobsen of Thisted, Johan Skjoldborg of Hannæs, Jakob Knudsen of Aggersborg, Jeppe Aakjær and Marie Bregendahl of Fjends, Nobel Prize laureate Johannes Vilhelm Jensen of Farsø and his sister Thit Jensen. Thøger Larsen of Lemvig belonged to the symbolism of the 1920s. Johannes Buchholtz in Struer was a prose writer and his home was a meeting point for many of the Limfjord writers. The house is still kept up by the Struer Museum, which allows visitors. Jeppe Aakjær's farm Jenle close to Skive, Johan Skjoldborg's house in Øsløs, and the Johannes V. Jensen Museum in Farsø are also open to the public. Erik Bertelsen of Harboør is best known for the song Blæsten går frisk over Limfjordens vande ('The Wind Goes Fresh over the Limfjord's Waters'), a much-used "local anthem".

The later ones of these Limfjord writers, along with a few others, formed the Jutland Movement, which revolted against the symbolism of the early 20th century. Instead, they wrote social realistic prose, often about poor and exploited people in the countryside, who were a part of Danish society little known to the establishment in Copenhagen.

== Biology and climate ==
The western breakthrough of 1825 changed the waters of the Limfjord from brackish to salty, with a considerable current from west to east. Hypoxia sometimes occurs due to warm windless periods in summer or ice in winter.

The fjord today has oceanic salinity, approximately 30 PSU (or per mille by weight) at all depths. Many animals and maritime plants that can be found in Skagerrak, Kattegat and the North Sea can thus be found in the fjord.

Due to its shallow waters, the temperature rises rather quickly during warm and sunny days from mid-April to early September. While in winter, ice can form faster during the cold periods, especially in bays with little current. Problematic ice conditions do not occur every winter.

The Limfjord is known for its large mussels (Mytilus edulis).
