= Aakjaer =

Aakjær is a Danish surname. Notable people with the surname include:

- Jeppe Aakjær (1866–1930), Danish poet and novelist
- Lauritz Petersen Aakjær (1883–1959), Danish architect
- Nanna Aakjær (1874–1962), Danish carpenter and woodcarver
