= Thyholm =

Thyholm may refer to two places in Denmark:

- Thyholm Municipality
- Thyholm Peninsula
