= SQW =

SQW may refer to:

- SQW, the IATA code for Skive Airport, Denmark
- SQW, the SAME code for Snow squall warning, an American bulletin
