= Nanna Aakjær =

Danish carpenter and woodcarver

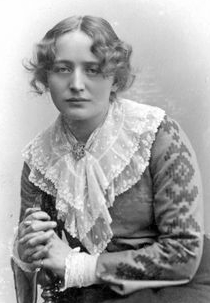
Nanna Aarkjær (1902)

Nielsine Juliane (Nanna) Aakjær née Krog (1874–1962) was a Danish carpenter and woodcarver. She is remembered in particular for contributing to the design and interior decor of Jenle, the residence on the Salling Peninsula in northern Jutland where she lived with her husband Jeppe Aakjær following their marriage in 1907. Nanna Aakjær was also active in the Women's Suffrage Association, arranging meetings at Jenle from 1908. The popular festive meetings at Jenle which she initiated in 1910 continue to be held at the beginning of August each year.

== Biography ==
Born in Store Døes Manor near Holstebro on 23 January 1874, Nielsine Juliane Jensen Krog was the daughter of Andreas Jensen Krog (1827–1887) and Maren Jensdatter Døes (1838–1919). One of 15 children, including six who died in childhood, she was brought up in an open-minded Grundtvigian family, where girls were given the same opportunities as boys. Her interest in carpentry and woodcarving stemmed ufrom her father who practised his trade in a workshop at the manor. As a result of poor health, he moved into a small house in the neighbourhood where Nanna kept him company and helped him with his work.

Following her father's death in 1887, Nanna aged 13 became a nanny for friends of the family in Skærum Mølle near Vemb while her mother sold the manor and moved to Copenhagen with the younger children. She later joined her family in Copenhagen where, after training as a carpenter with her brothers, she attended the Arts and Crafts School for Women, graduating as a carpenter in 1895. She continued her education at the Technical School in Stockholm. Thanks to two grants, she was able to take a study trip to London and a course at the crafts college at Nääs Castle in Gothenburg. While in London, she gained insights into the artistic trends in Europe as well as the social and political issues facing women in England. On completing her studies in Stockholm, she became a particularly well educated women, who in addition to her qualifications in art and design, mastered several languages. In 1898, she returned to her mother's home in Copenhagen as a qualified woodcarver.

In 1902, she met the writer Jeppe Aarkjær. They fell in love but as a result of complications with Jeppe's divorce from Marie Bregendahl, their wedding did not take place for some time. They finally married in Copenhagen City Hall on 25 April 1907. It was Nanna Krog who came up with the first designs of Jenle but she later entrusted the architectural design work to her friend Povl Baumann. It was however Nanna who designed the colourful interiors. They moved into Jenle immediately after their marriage and remained their for the rest of their lives.

Nanna Aakjær was also active in the Women's Suffrage Association, arranging meetings at Jenle from 1908. The popular festive meetings at Jenle which she initiated in 1910 continue to be held at the beginning of August each year.

== Family ==
Nanna and Jeppe Aakjær had two children together: Solveig Bjerre (1908–2001) and Espen Aakjær (1911–1958). After her husband died on 22 April 1930, Nanna continued to live in Jenle until she sold it to her daughter Solveig in 1961. She died while in hospital in Skive on 4 August 1962.
