= Paula Trock =

Danish weaver (1889–1979)

Paula Trock (1889–1979) was a Danish weaver who began producing her own fabrics at the Troba workshop in Sønderborg in the early 1930s. In 1945, she established Spindegården near Vejen in the south of Jutland which she headed until 1969. There she developed innovative processes, producing a wide range of textiles, especially for use in the home. Trock's curtains were commissioned for the United Nations Headquarters in New York, for Marselisborg Palace in Aarhus, and for the Royal Yacht Dannebrog.

== Biography ==
Born on 10 February 1889 in Holbæk, Paula Trock was the daughter of the dairy operator Peter Hermann Gottlieb Trock (1854–1920) and Elina Ida Maria Voss Sünckenberg (1850–1937). Together with her three siblings, her mothers work was involved in Denmark's Inner Mission and a father who gained a reputation for his cheeses.

In 1925, she entered Askov Højskole, a folk high school, where she established friendships with the principals, Karen and Jens Therkelsen Arnfred, and with Jenny la Cour, who introduced her to weaving. Hoping to make a career in weaving, in 1926 she made study trips to Sätergläntan in Dalarna, Sweden, Tavastehus, Finland, and Dartington Hall in Devon, England.

In 1928, supported by the weaver Else Kock and the housekeeping teacher Rigmore Seidelin-Larsen and in conjunction with Askov Højskole, she established a weaving school in Poul la Cour's former home. The curriculum consisted of a six-month course in practical weaving and three months' theory. Among the experts she brought in were Paulli Andersen (1906–1990) and Frances van Hall from the Netherlands. In 1934, the school moved to Sønderborghus on the island of Als, where the Troba weaving workshop was also established. Despite considerable success, in 1943 the Germans took the school over during the occupation.

In 1948, Trock opened the Spindegården production facility immediately adjacent to Askov High School. The textile artist Inge Bjørn became closely associated with the new establishment. It proved to be a pioneering development centre for experimentation with the use of new weaving materials, spinning techniques, and dying. She also worked with cellophane, creating curtains for the 1960 Milan Triennal. In 1970, she transferred the management of Spindegården to Hanne Vedel who had worked with her for many years. Vedel moved the production facility to Aabenraa, preserving Trock's designs and manufacturing processes. Trock's curtains were commissioned for the United Nations Headquarters in New York, for Marselisborg Palace in Aarhus, and for the Royal Yacht Dannebrog.

For her outstanding work, Paula Trock received wide recognition including the Grand Prix for the 1935 and 1937 world exhibitions and gold medals for the Milan Triennials in 1954, 1957 and 1960. In 1959, she was honoured as a Knight of the Dannebrog. She died in Lunderskov on 18 November 1979. She is buried in Ørslev Cemetery in Kalundborg.
