= Rikke Helms =

Danish academic and cultural worker

Rikke Marianne Helms (born 25 February 1948) is a Danish cultural worker and leader of the Danish Cultural Institute's office in Saint Petersburg.

== Early life and education ==
Rikke Helms was born in 1948 in Skive, Denmark to Dr Peder Georg Helms (1920–2005), a physician, and Sara (née Tønnesen) Helms (1911–1999); she has two brothers. She spent most of her childhood in the eastern Greenland in connection with her parents work as physicians.

In 1966, she took the studentereksamen at the Horsens Statsskole. In 1976, she was awarded cand.mag. in Russian and Danish language studies from the University of Copenhagen. Following a one-year study at the Leningrad State University, she worked as a travel guide for tourists and congresses in the former Soviet Union in the period 1970–75 during her years of studies.

== Career ==
From 1977 to 1985, she worked in Denmark's educational system. She returned in 1985 to the Soviet Union to work as a rector at the Moscow State University until 1990, when she was appointed as the first leader of the newly created Danish Cultural Institute's office in Riga, during a turbulent period when Latvia regained its independence. Helms held this position until 2003 when she was appointed as leader of the Danish Cultural Institute's office in Saint Petersburg.

Rikke Helms has been the recipient of several civilian awards for her work. In 1993 she was awarded the Ebbe Muncks Hæderspris. She was awarded the Order of the Three Stars, 3rd Class on 7 November 1994, and was the first foreigner after Latvia regained its independence to do so. In 1996 Helms was awarded an honorary Doctorate by the Latvian Academy of Culture. In 2011 she was awarded the Order of the Dannebrog, 3rd Class.

== Sources ==
- Artikel hos Horsens Leksikon (in Danish)
- Profil i KVINFOs Ekspertdatabase (in Danish)
