= Jegindø =

Danish island

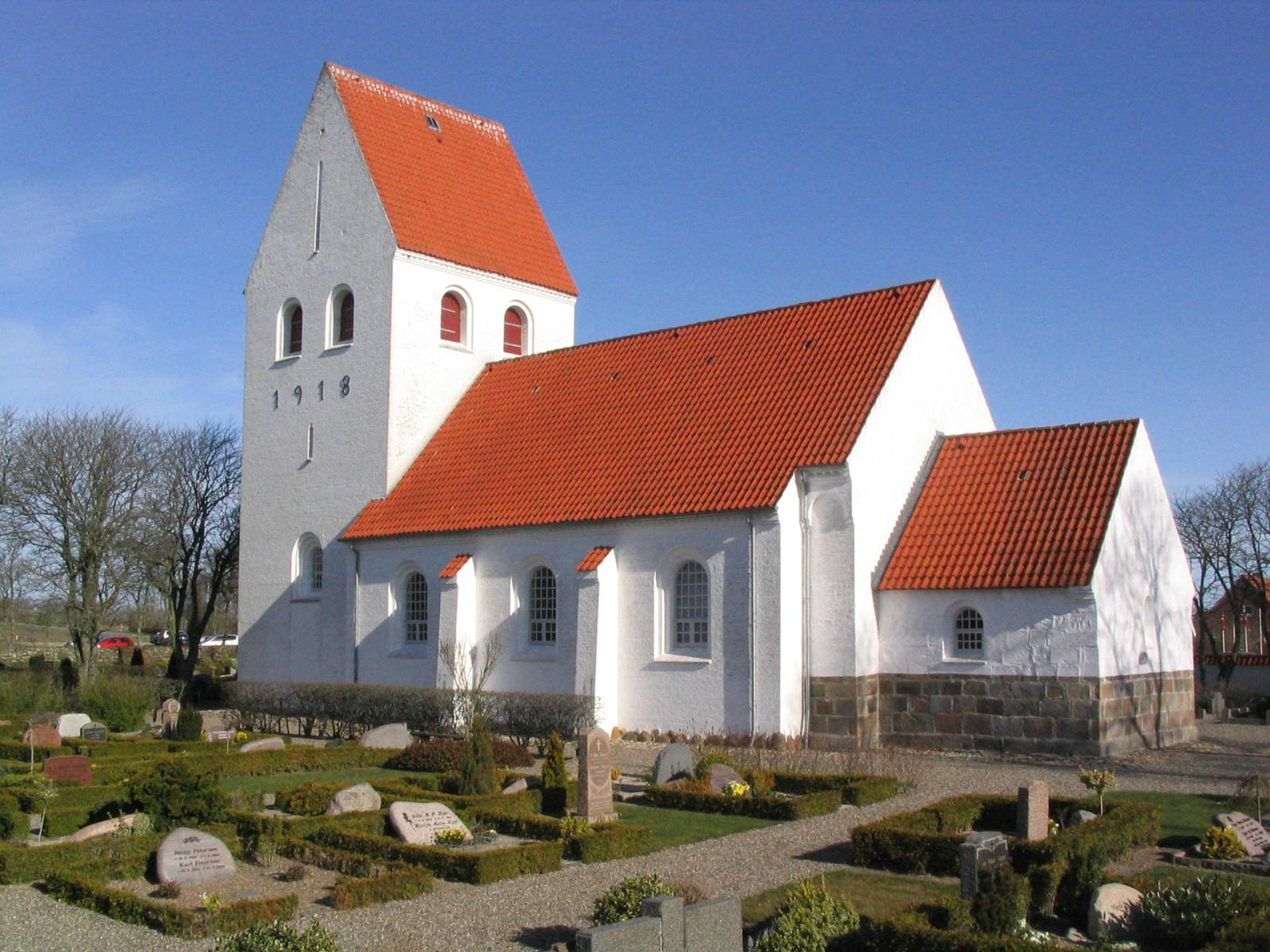
- The Church of Jegindø

- Location of Jegindø in Denmark. Jegindø (Central Denmark Region)

Geography
- Location: Limfjord
- Coordinates: 56°39′N 8°38′E
- Area: 7.91 km^{2} (3.05 sq mi)

Administration
- Denmark
- Region: Central Denmark Region
- Municipality: Struer Municipality

Demographics
- Population: 386 (2025)

Additional information
- Time zone: CET (UTC+1)
  - Summer (DST): CEST (UTC+2)

Jegindø, locally pronounced 'Jenø', is a Danish island in the western part of the Limfjord. Since 1916 the island has been connected with the peninsula Thyholm via a dam. The main settlement is Jegind. Until 2007, the island was part of Thyholm Municipality, but now it is part of Struer Municipality. The population of Jegindø was 386 inhabitants as of 2025.

Jegindø has a church near the center of the island, a harbour on the east coast, and a mission house. The harbour was expanded in 1989, but originally built in 1939. The church and the mission house were built in 1919 and 1888 respectively. Commercially, the main industries are fisheries, the sale of fish and mussels, and farming.

== Geography ==
Jegindø covers an area of 7.91 km^{2}. It is 6 km long and 3 km across at its widest point. There are no rivers, or lakes on Jegindø and almost no forest area. Hills dominate on the southern part of the island, while the northern part is mostly flat. The highest point on the island is near the east coast and is 13 metres above sea level.

== History ==
In 1523, Jegindø was gifted to Tyge Krabbe by the king, Frederick I of Denmark, and it was owned by his family in several generations. By 1805, farmers on the island had begun purchasing their own farms and land.

Before the dam that connected Jegindø to Thyholm was built in 1916, there was a ferry connection to Tambosund. In addition to this connection, there was also a rowing ferry sailing from the north-eastern part of the island to Mors up until the mid 1900s.
