= Egholm =

Island in Limfjorden, Denmark

Coordinates: 57°3′50″N 9°50′35″E

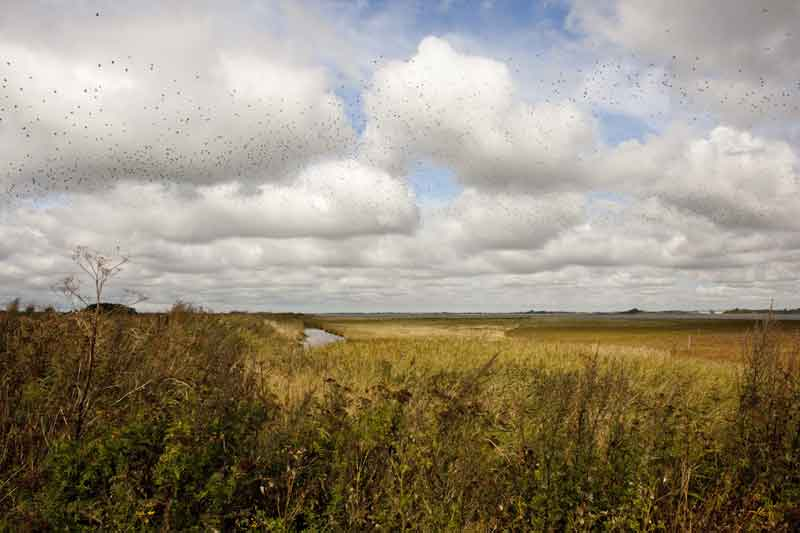
Egholm

Egholm is a Danish island in the Limfjord close to Aalborg. The island covers an area of 6.05 square kilometres (2.3 sq mi) and had 55 inhabitants in 2013. Egholm can be reached by a five-minute ferry ride from Aalborg.
