= Hanne Vedel =

Danish weaver (born 1933)

Hanne Elisabet Vedel (born 23 January 1933) is a Danish weaver who has created her own textiles since 1955, using natural raw materials such as silk, wool and cotton. In 1979, after acquiring Spindegården from Paula Trock, she moved the establishment to Aabenraa, making it her design and production facility. Her fabrics have been widely used in Denmark and abroad, for churches, courts of law and banks. In 1952, Finn Juhl used her materials for the upholstery and curtains when designing the United Nations Trusteeship Council in New York. They were reapplied in the 2013 renovation.

== Early life ==
Born on 23 January 1933, in Skive, Hanne Elisabet Vedel was the daughter of the folk high school principal Anders Aaby Vedel (1878–1939) and the restaurateur Helene Frederikke Solmer (1895–1978). She was the youngest of five children. She attended Rødding Friskole and a folk high school in Norway. In 1949, she was trained in weaving as an apprentice with Cis Fink in Aabenraa. In 1951, she continued her education at a folk high school in Finland. In 1955, she married the architect Jens Peder Dall (1916–1994).

== Career ==
While in Finland, she worked for an arts and crafts business in Helsinki where she was trained by Uhra Simberg Ehrstrøm, a textile artist. She also attended evening courses with the Finnish designer Kaj Franck.

On returning to Denmark in 1953, she was employed by Paula Trock at Spindegården in Askov. She opened her workshop in Aabenraa in 1955. In 1970, on taking over management of Spindegården, she moved the firm to Aabenraa where she produced textiles with traditional Danish designs, including carpets, curtains and upholstery. Her designs are simple but attractive, often with striped patterns with few colours. She has also developed knitted goods and other textiles in collaboration with other artists, including Vibeke Lind, Pia Hedegaard, Anne Abildtrup, Kirsten Toftegaard and Johanne Heide. Her naturally produced materials that could not be obtained elsewhere proved popular with those designing folk costumes.

In the 1980s and 1990s, Vedel gained recognition for the textiles she created for decorating churches and cathedrals throughout the country. They have also been used to decorate courtrooms and company buildings at home and abroad. In 1952, Finn Juhl used her materials for the upholstery and curtains when designing the United Nations Trusteeship Council in New York. They were reapplied in the 2013 renovation.
