= Skive, Denmark =

Skive
- Town
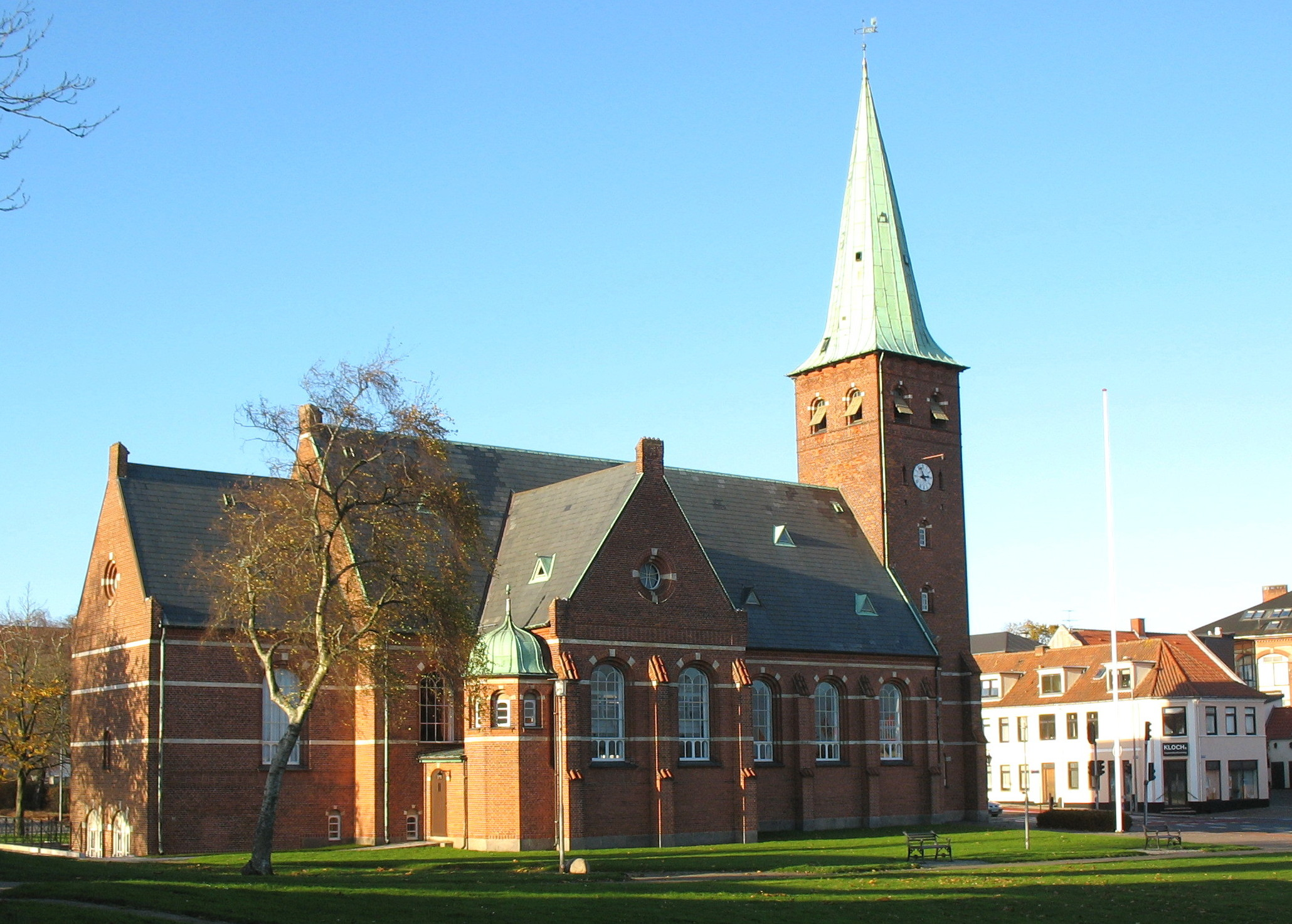
- Skive church

- Coat of arms
- Motto: Salling’s Capital
- Location within Denmark Location within Central Denmark Region
- Coordinates: 56°34′N 9°1′E
- Country: Denmark
- Region: Central Denmark Region (Midtjylland)
- Municipality: Skive
- Founded: 1231

Area
  - Urban: 14.9 km^{2} (5.8 sq mi)

Population (2026)
  - Urban: 20,092
  - Urban density: 1,350/km^{2} (3,490/sq mi)
  - Gender: 9,999 males and 10,093 females
- Demonym: Skibonit
- Time zone: UTC+1 (CET)
- Website: skive.dk

Skive is a town in Skive municipality (Danish, Skive Kommune) in Region Midtjylland at the base of Salling Peninsula, a part of the larger Jutland peninsula in northwest Denmark. It is the municipality's main town and the site of its municipal council.

The town of Skive is located at the mouth of the Karup River (Karup Å) and the Skive Fjord, part of the Limfjord. Skive has a population of 20,092 (1 January 2026).

The sociologist Richard Jenkins used his field work in Skive as the basis for his book Being Danish: Paradoxes of Identity in Everyday Life.

== Attractions ==
- 14th century Spøttrup Castle underwent extensive repairs in the 1940s, and opened as a museum and medicinal herb garden with activities such as Halloween and ghost-tours throughout the year and the large medieval market, Bispens Market, in the summer.
- Skive Art Museum (Skive Kunstmuseum) is housed in a building designed by Danish architect Leopold Teschl, who also designed the Skive Historical Museum. The Art Museum houses a broad collection of modern Danish art, and has a special interest in expressive landscapes and New Realism painting. The collection also has works by local artists, including Christen Dalsgaard, a national romantic painter associated with the Golden Age of Danish Painting.
- The Museum also has a stuffed polar bear, which was donated to Skive by the friendship city of Scoresbysund in Greenland.
- The Fur Museum is on the island of Fur, part of the Skive municipality. It features exhibits relating to the island, particularly fossils.
- The Four Boxes Gallery is located in the grounds of the Krabbesholm Højskole, with an unusual modern design by Japanese architects Atelier Bow-Wow.
- The Mønsted Limestone Caves south-west of Skive are run by Denmark's nature-preservation group, Skov- og Naturstyrelse. As well as being a tourist attraction, the caves are used as a place to age cheese, which is then exported to Germany as "cavecheese". In winter, the caves are home to 10,000 bats.
- The home of writer Jeppe Aakjær Jenle is situated just north of the city and is open to public as a museum
- One of Denmark's largest dairies, Thise Mejeri, is situated in the small town Thise on the peninsula of Salling. The dairy is entirely organic, produces everything from milk to cheese to yoghurt, and is known for introducing more experimental, old and forgotten, or exotic dairy products to the Danish market, like skyr. There is a shop by the dairy and they have tours open to public
- One of the only places in Europe and first place in Denmark with trips in completely see-through canoe/kayak-hybrids, VisionKayak, is situated in Skive
- The outdoor museum Hjerl Hede displays life at the Danish countryside through 300 years with old crafts, houses, games, shops etc.
- In Skive, all the roundabouts have been decorated with pieces of art known as the 11 Stars, designed by the Danish designer Timothy Jacob Jensen.
- Common amenities, such as supermarkets, shops, a bowling alley and hotels, are all to be found in the town centre.

== Transportation ==
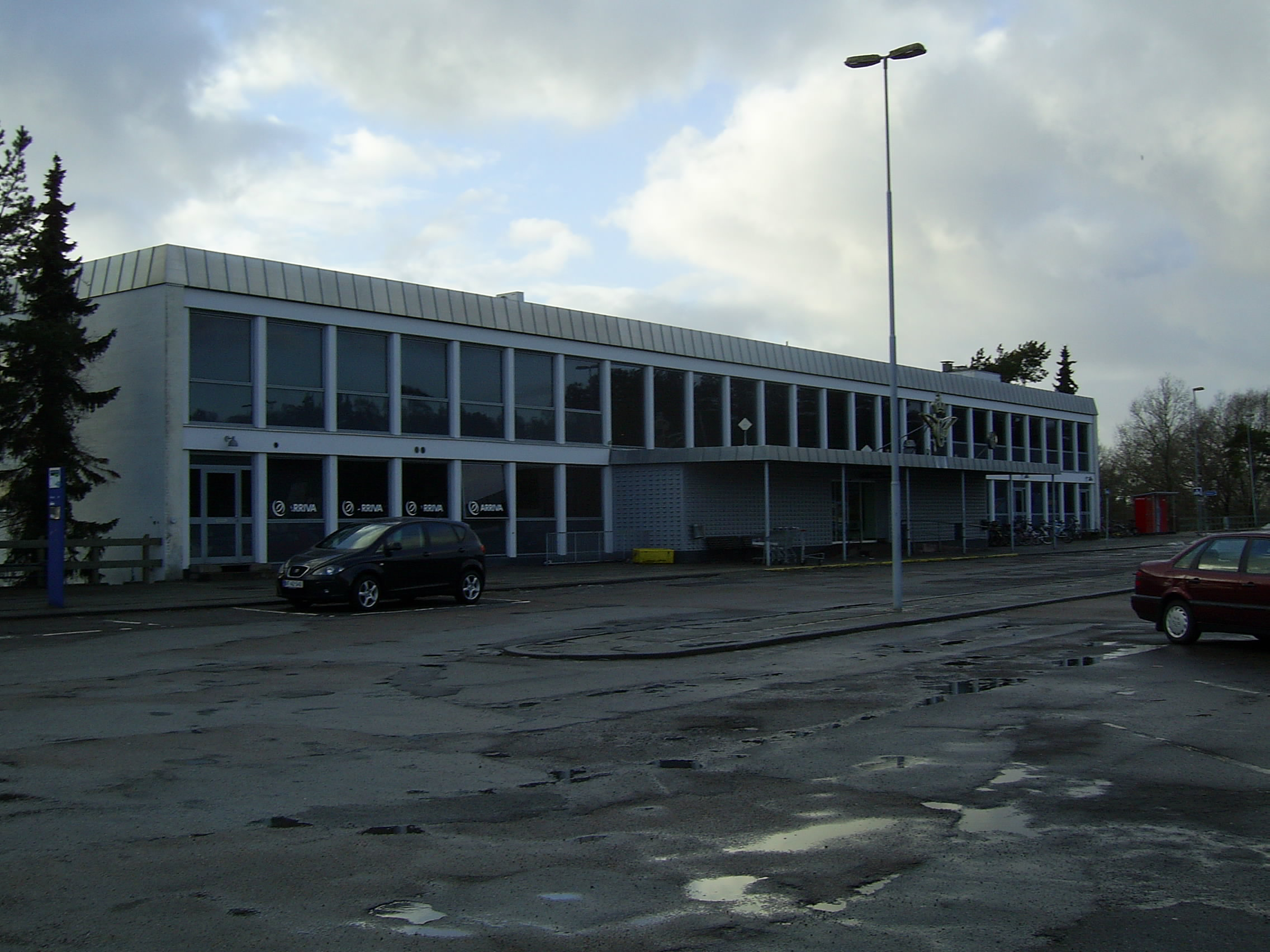
Front façade of Skive railway station

=== Rail ===
Skive is served by Skive railway station. It is located on the Langå–Struer railway line and offers direct InterCity services to Copenhagen and Struer and regional train services to Aarhus and Struer.

=== Air ===
Skive Airport is a regional private jet airport suitable for a variety of private jets.

== International relations ==
Skive is twinned with:

Arvika, Sweden; Kongsvinger, Norway	Qasigiannguit, Greenland; Ylöjärvi, Finland

== Notable people ==
=== The Arts ===
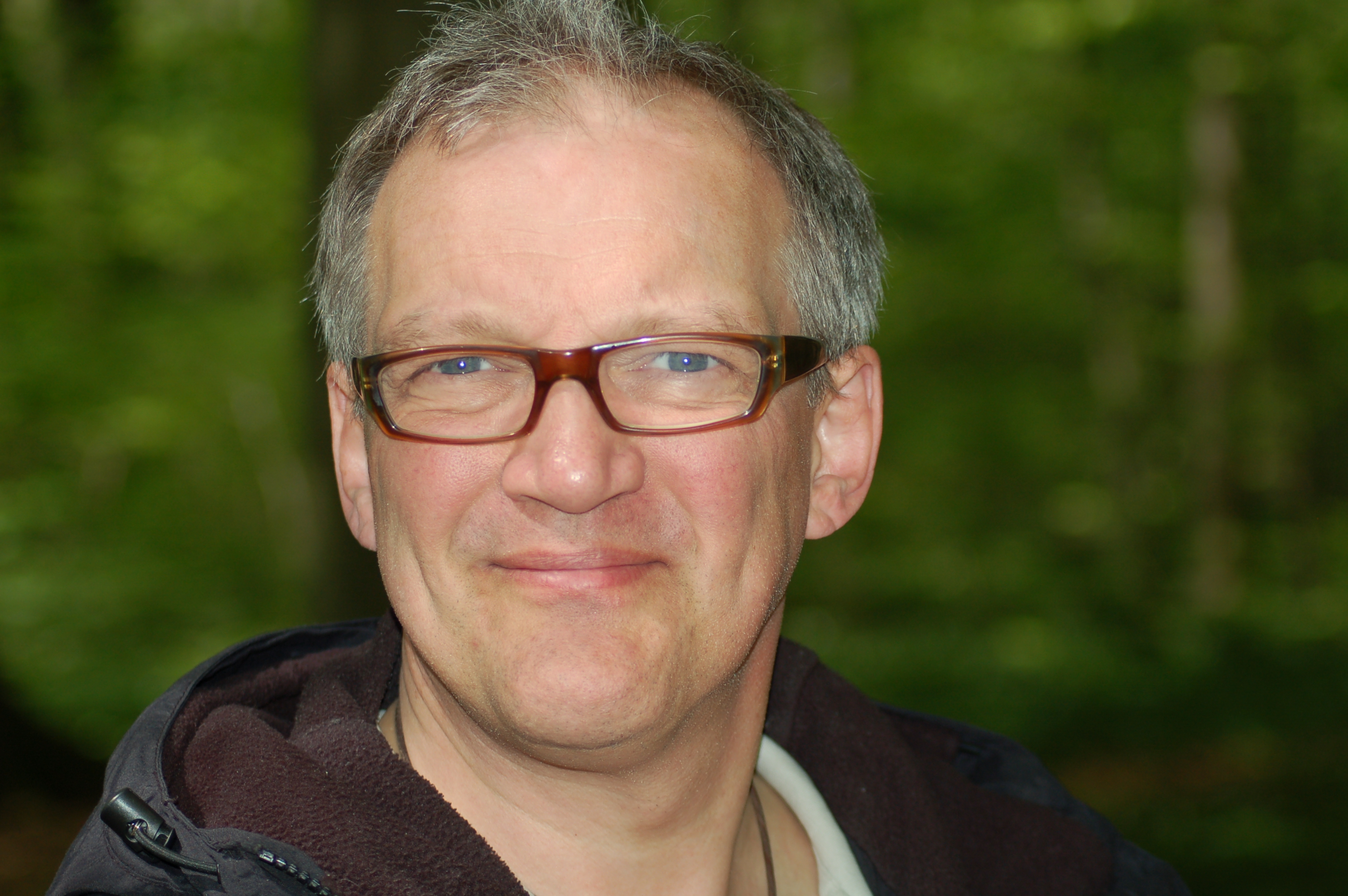
Preben Kristensen, 2008

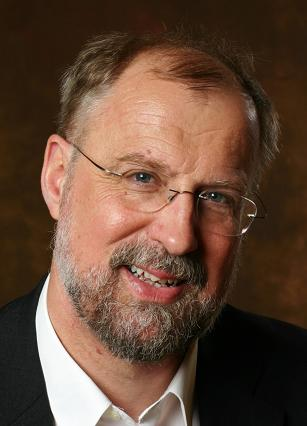
Johannes Lebech, 2006

- Christen Dalsgaard (1824–1907) painter, a late student of Christoffer Wilhelm Eckersberg
- Jeppe Aakjær (1866 in Fly – 1930) poet and novelist, a member of the Jutland Movement
- Marie Bregendahl (1867 in Fly – 1940) Danish author of rural literature
- Jens August Schade (1903–1978) poet, his 1928 work "Læren om staten" is part of the Danish Culture Canon
- Henning Dahl Mikkelsen (1915–1982) cartoonist, created the newspaper comic strip Ferd'nand, signed as Mik
- Hanne Vedel (born 1933) a Danish weaver, creates her own textiles using natural raw materials
- Ulf Pilgaard (born 1940) actor, son of a priest, he studied theology but became an actor
- Preben Kristensen (born 1953) actor, one of the musical comedy trio Linie 3 in 1979
- Per Fly (born 1960) a Danish film director
- Thomas Troelsen (born 1981) singer, songwriter, and producer
- Mads Langer (born 1984) singer-songwriter, covered "You're Not Alone" by Olive
- Dúné (formed 2001) electronic rock band from Skive, now in Copenhagen

=== Public Service & Business ===
- Rikke Helms (born 1948), cultural worker and leader
- Johannes Lebech (born 1948) politician, was Minister for Ecclesiastical Affairs and MEP
- Jens Peter Christensen (born 1956) Supreme Court judge.

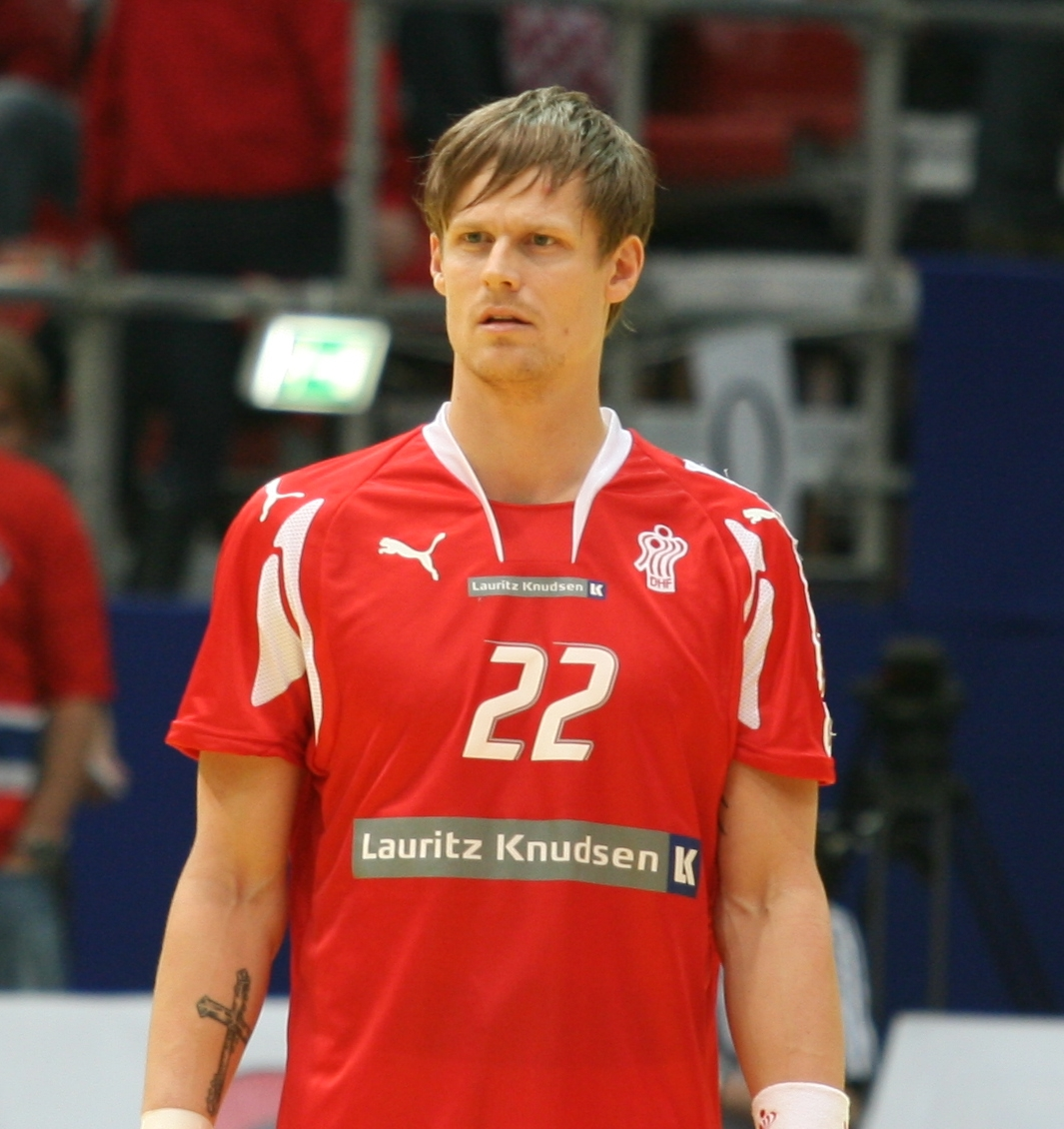
Kasper Søndergaard, 2008

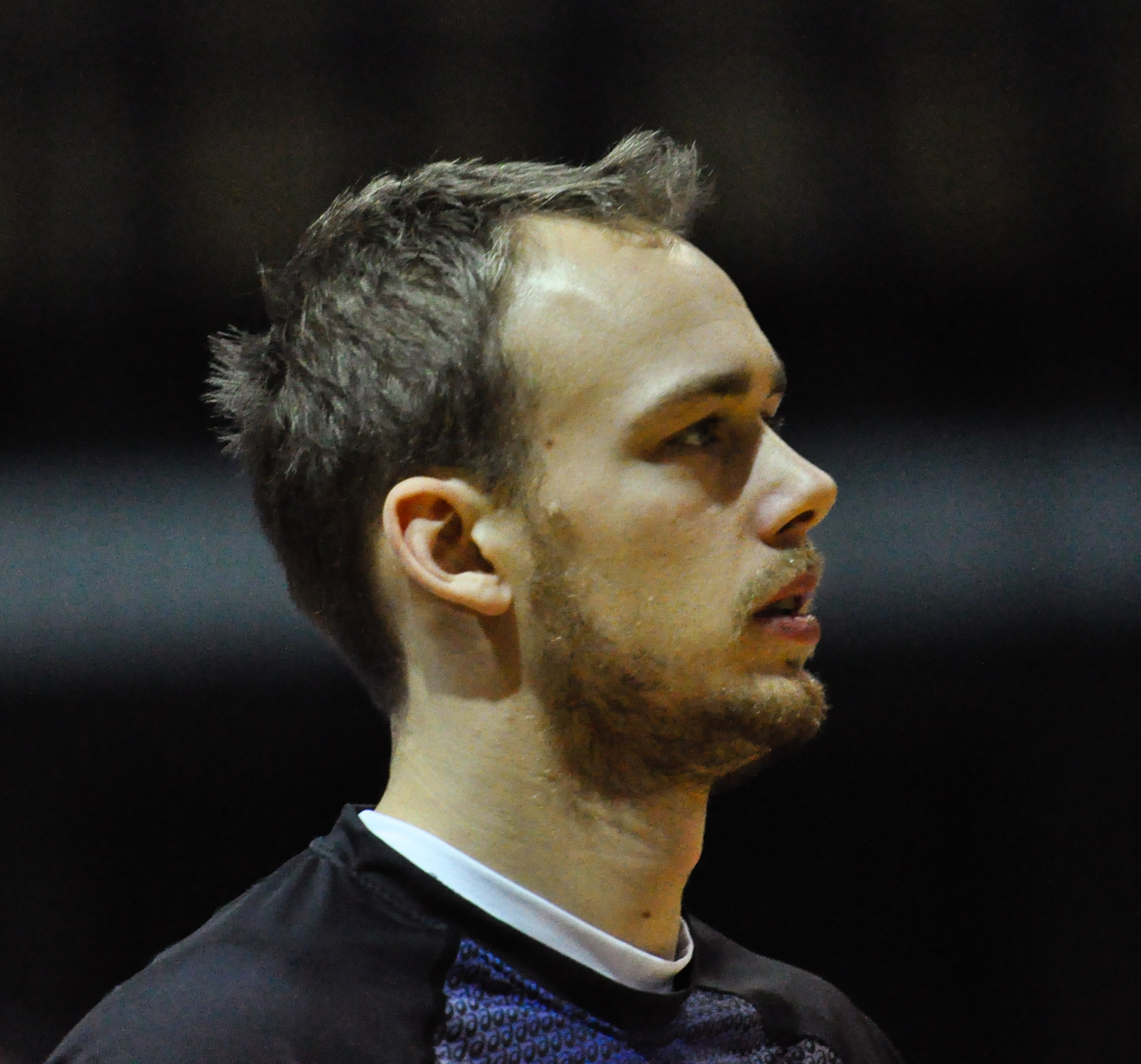
Henrik Toft Hansen, 2008

- Jesper deClaville Christiansen (born 1963) professor in Materials Science and Technology.
- Martin Møller Nielsen (born 1964) a UK-based Danish billionaire, the chairman of Nordic Aviation Capital (NAC).

=== Sport ===
- Christian Pedersen (1874–1957) sports shooter, competed in two events at the 1908 Summer Olympics
- Gerda Weltz (born 1951) former female darts player.
- Per Sandahl Jørgensen (born 1953) former cyclist, competed in the 1980 Summer Olympics
- Knud Storgaard (born 1972) professional golfer.
- Kasper Søndergaard (born 1981) handball player for Skjern Håndbold and the Denmark men's national handball team.
- Rasmus Würtz (born 1983) footballer who played in midfield for AaB in the Danish Superliga.
- Henrik Toft Hansen (born 1986) pro handballer for SG Flensburg-Handewitt and the Denmark men's national handball team.
- Peter Balling (born 1990) handball player for Team Tvis Holstebro and the Denmark men's national handball team.
- Line Haugsted (born 1994) handball player for Viborg HK and the Denmark women's national handball team

== Photographs of Skive ==
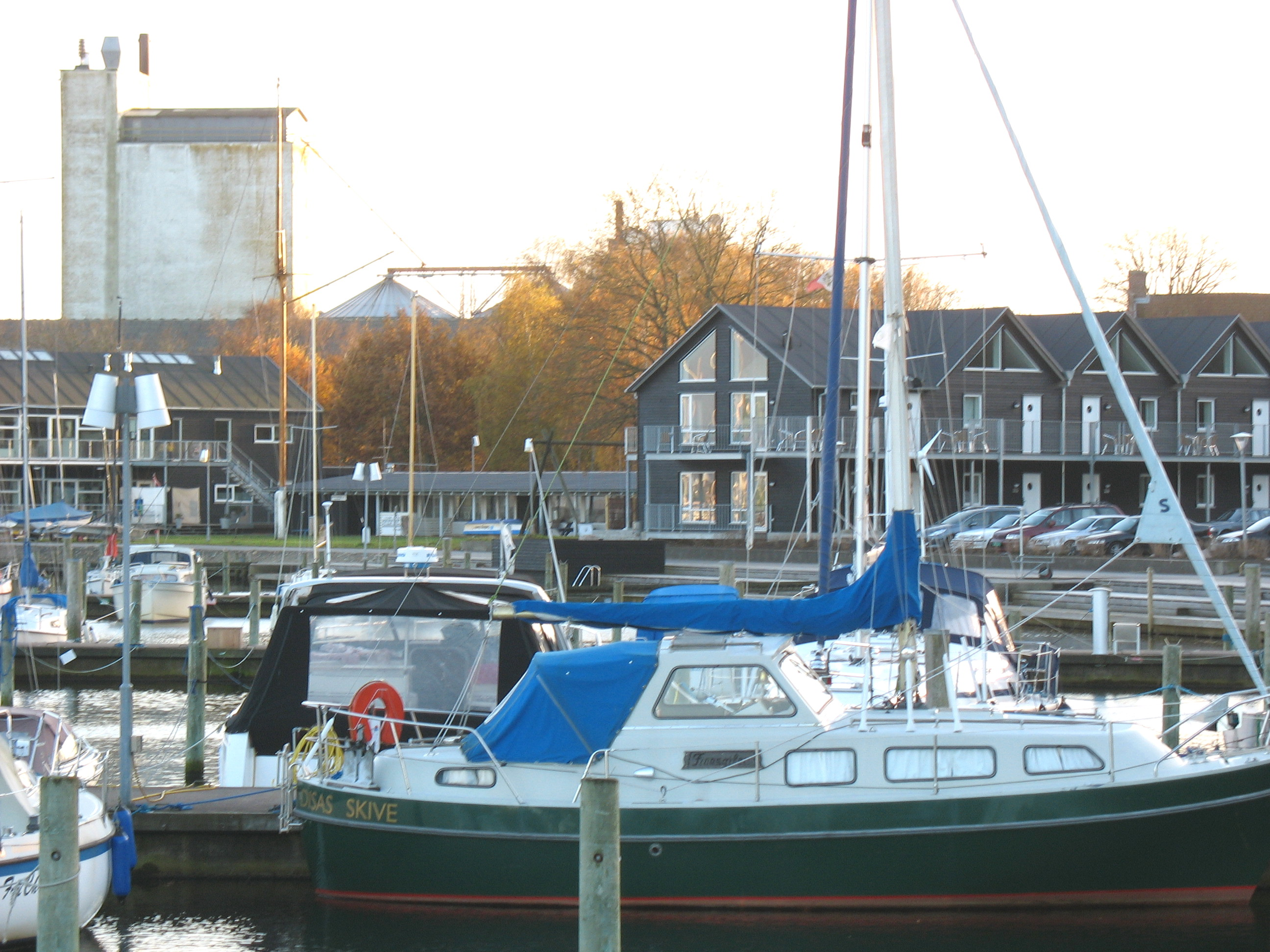
Skive Marina (1)

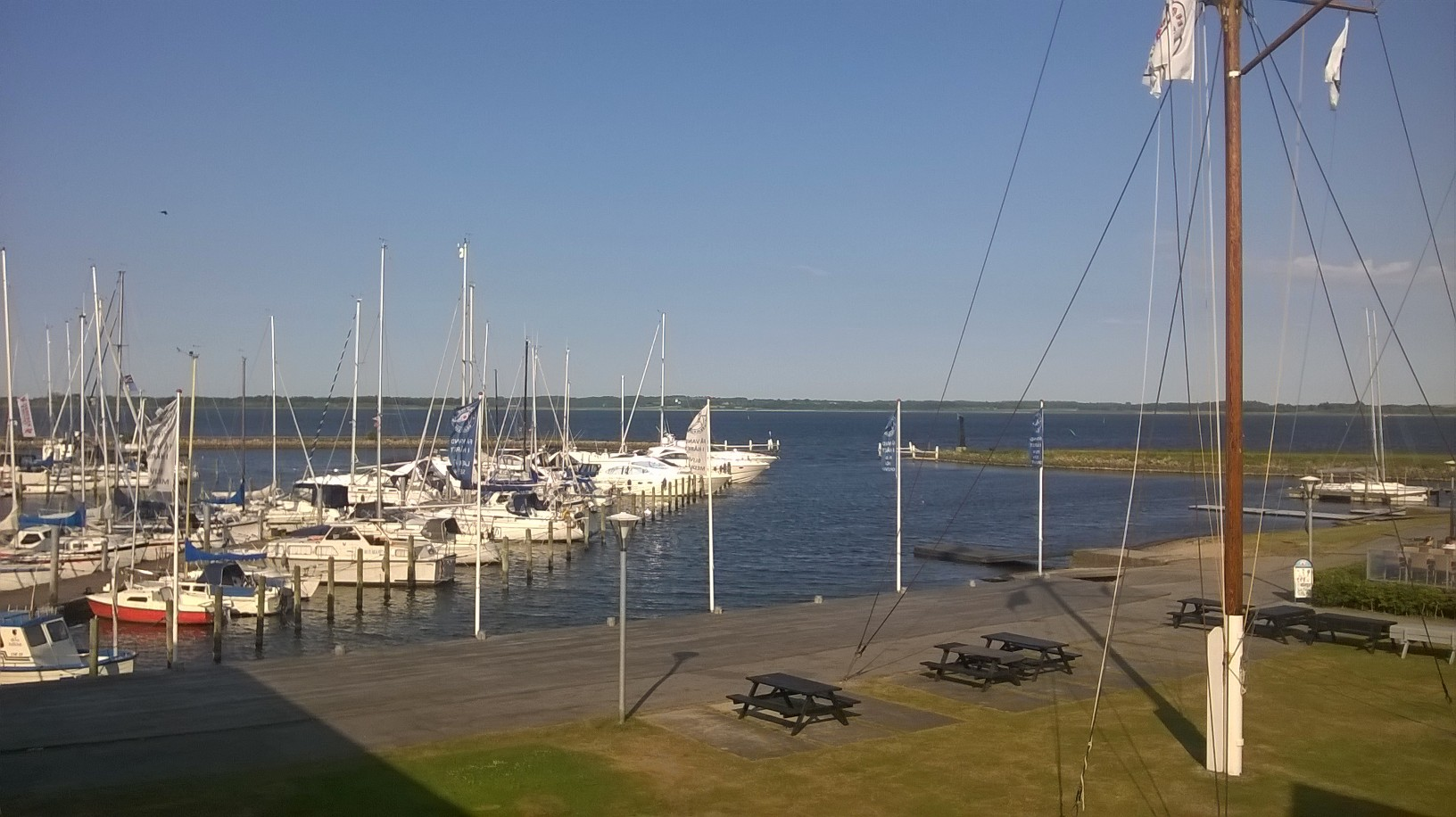
Skive Marina (2)

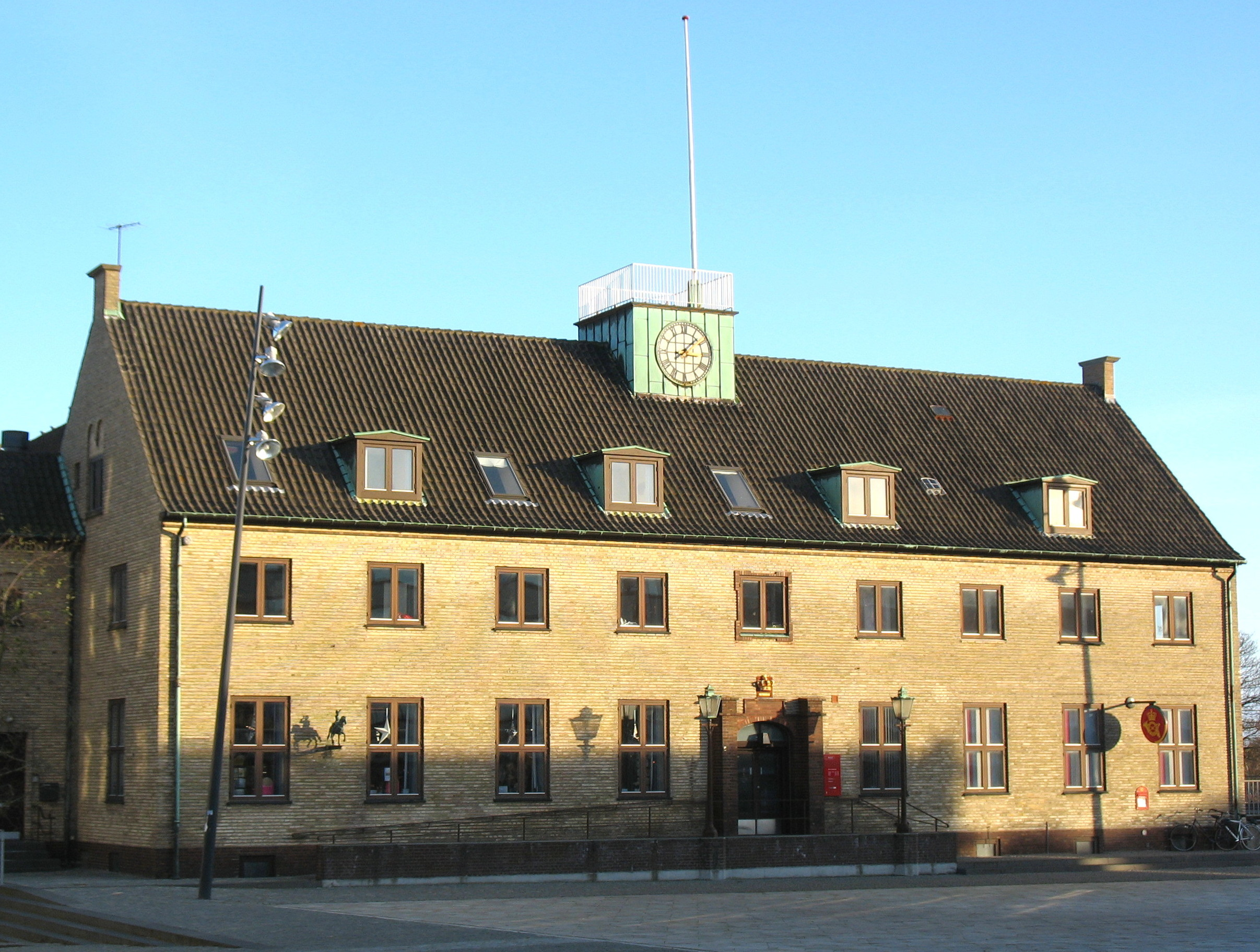
The town's post office

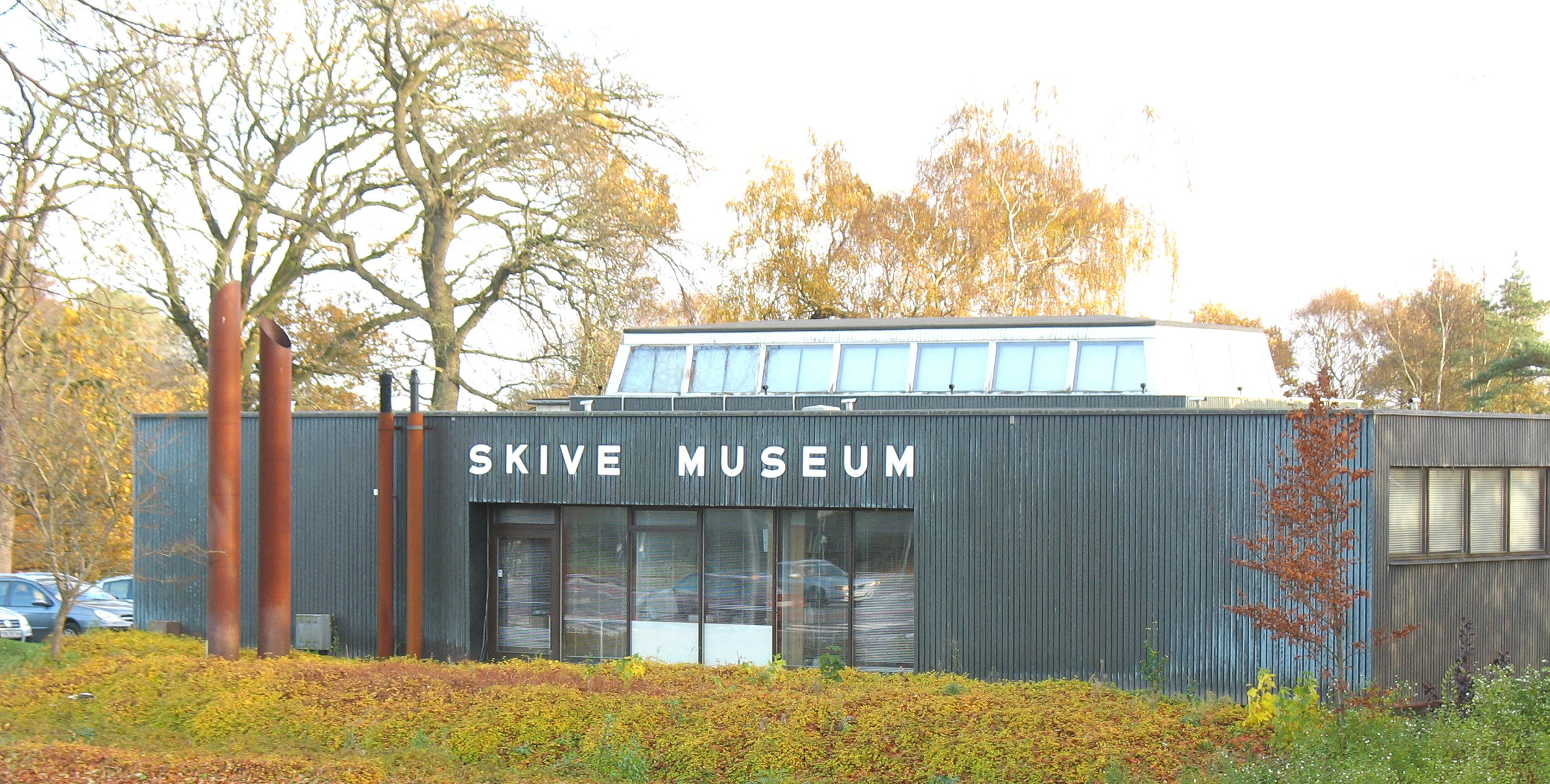
Skive museum

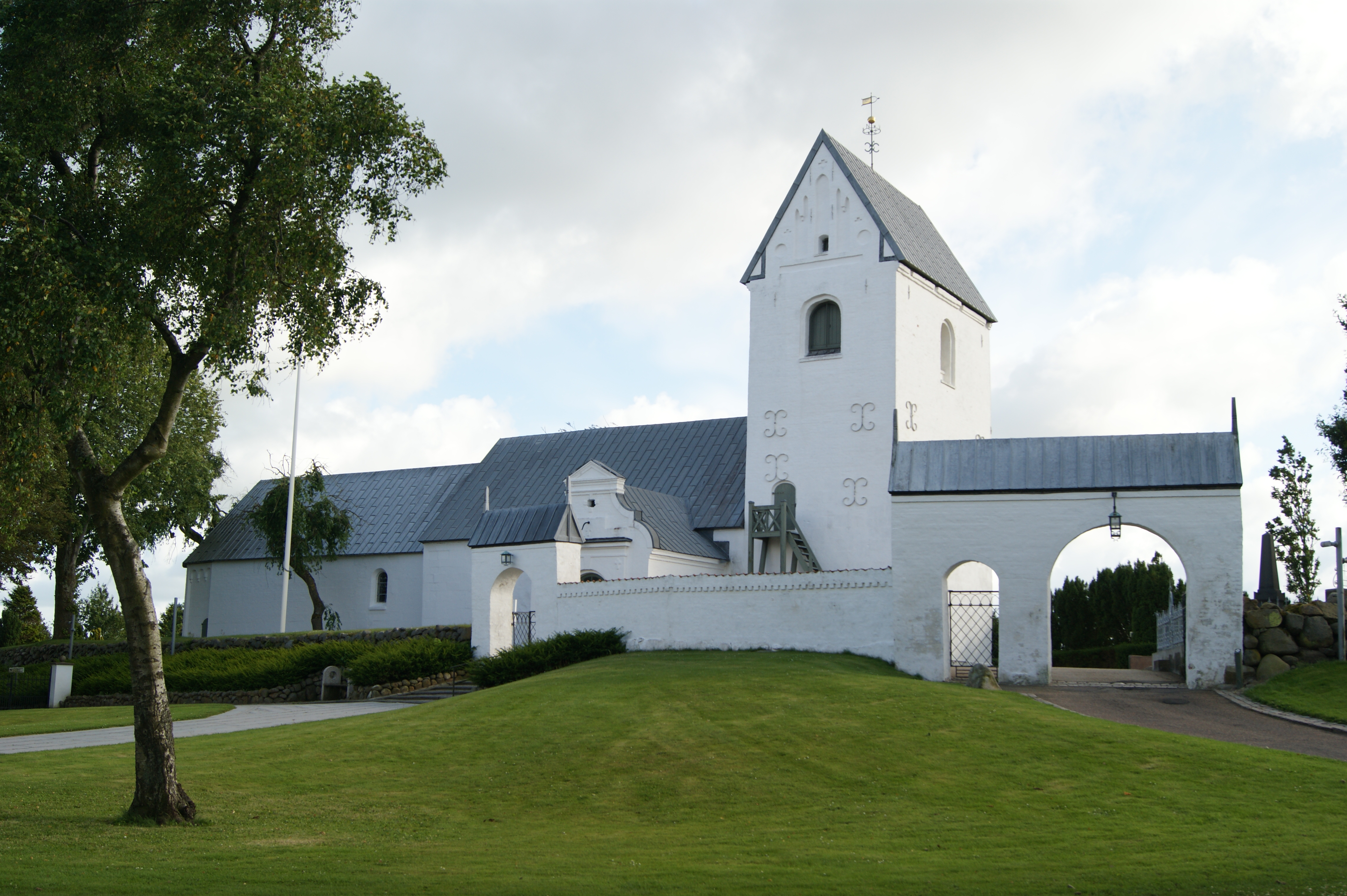
Church of Our Lady, Skive

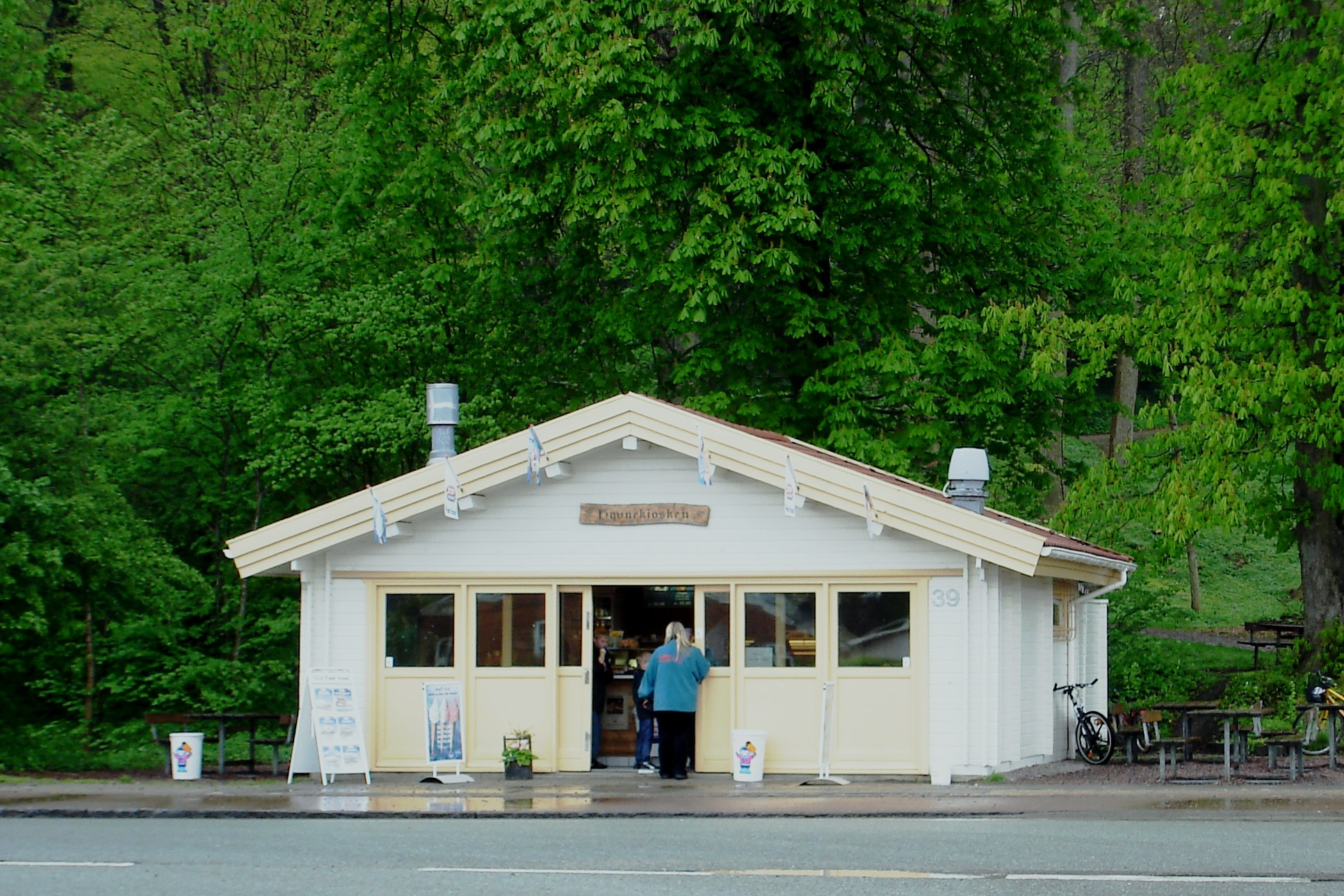
Havnekiosken, Skive

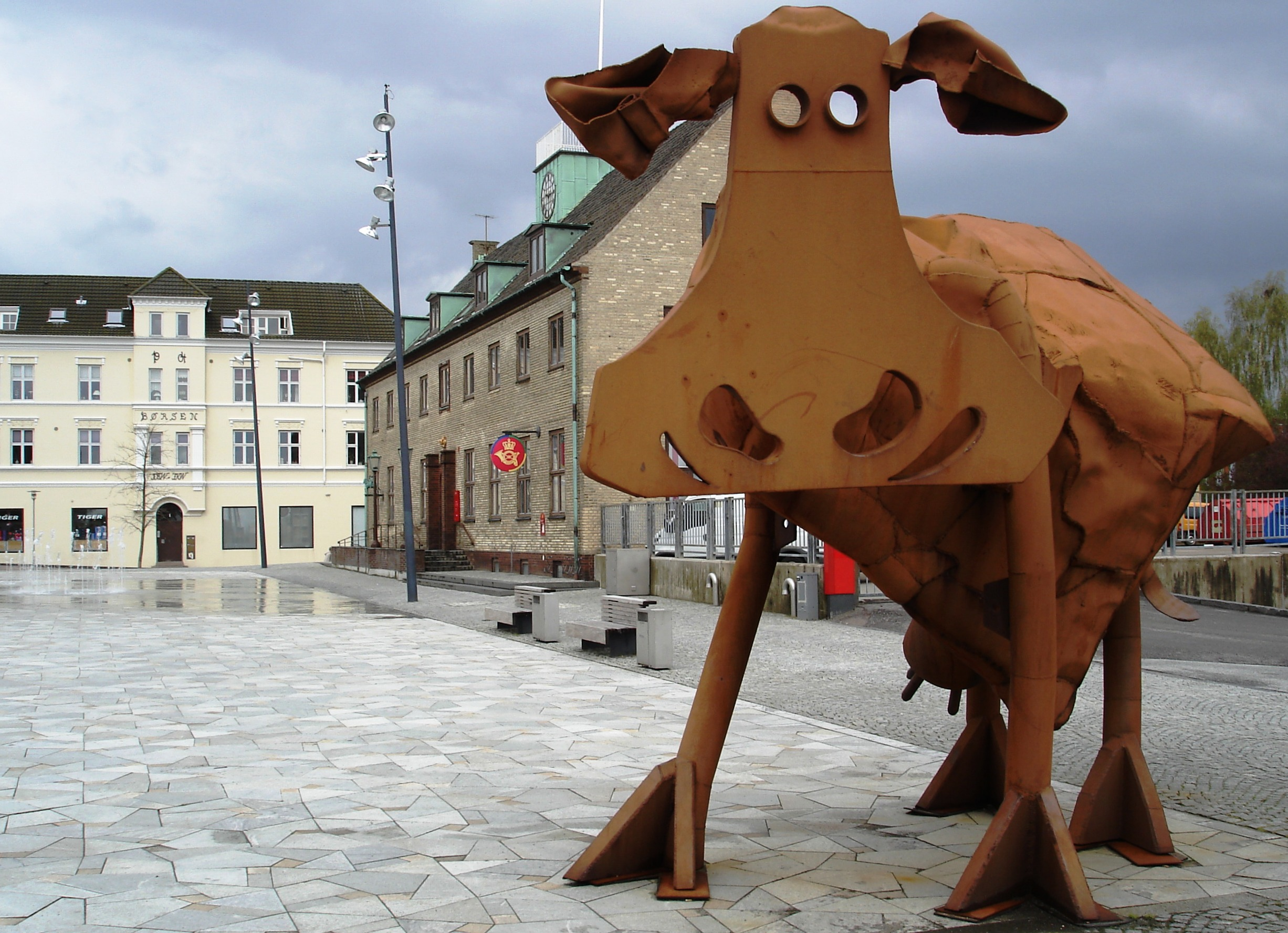
Cow by Bernhard Lipsøe
