= Jutland Movement =

Group of Danish writers

The Jutland Movement, or folkelige realister [popular realists], was a group of loosely affiliated Danish writers. Their writing style, which dealt with the rural life of the Jutland peasants, formed them into a group. They existed around the turn of the twentieth century.

== Members ==
Members of the group were Jeppe Aakjær, Marie Bregendahl, Johannes V. Jensen (arguably the most successful member of the group), Thit Jensen, Knud Hjortø, Johan Skjoldborg, Martin Andersen Nexø, Thøger Larsen, and Jakob Knudsen.

== See also ==
- Modern Breakthrough
