= Thyholm Municipality =

Former municipality in Denmark

Coordinates: 56°38′02″N 8°31′59″E

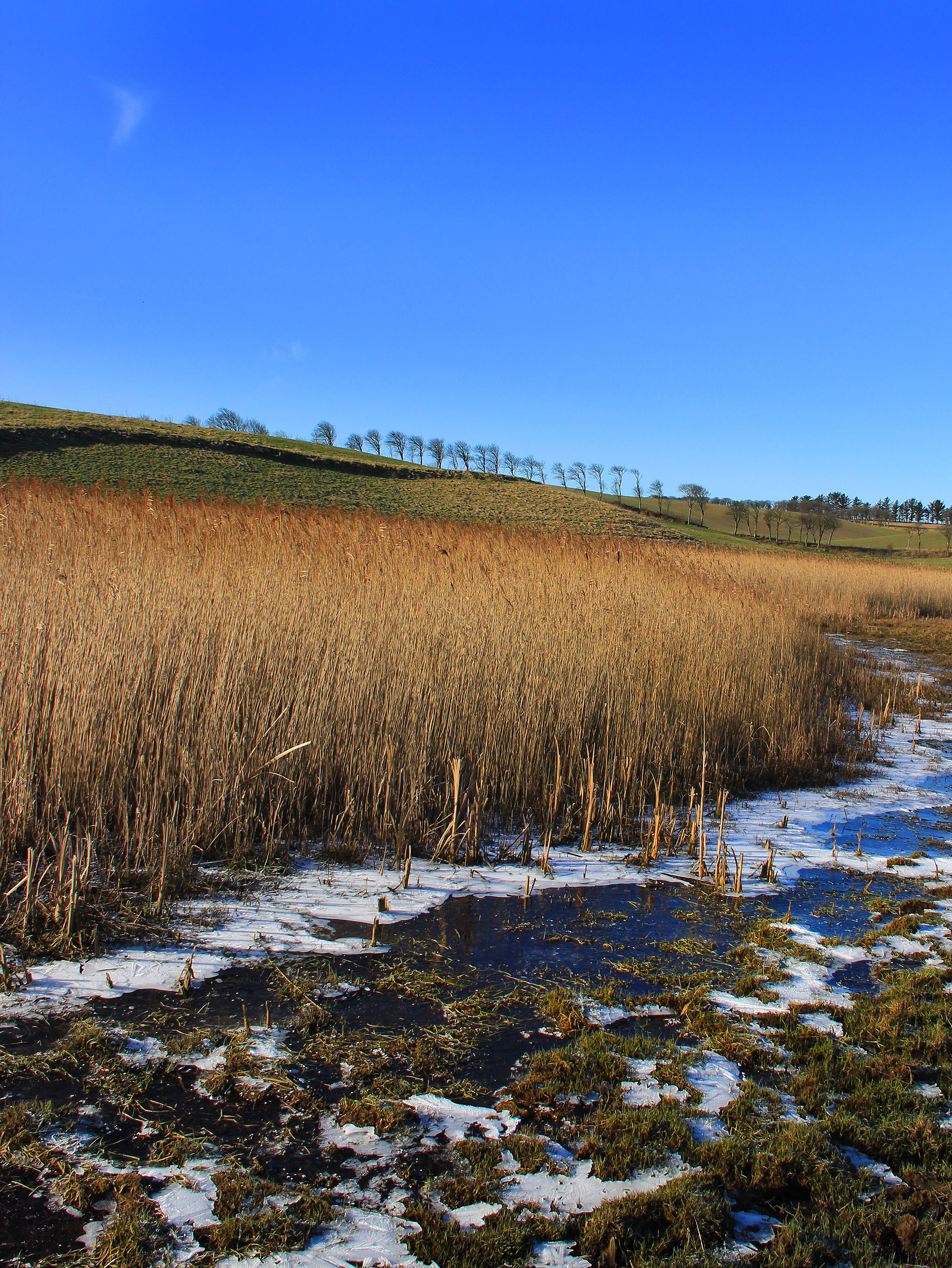

Until January 1, 2007, Thyholm was a municipality (Danish, kommune) in the former Ringkjøbing County on the island of Vendsyssel-Thy, a part of the Jutland area in northwest Denmark. The municipality included the island of Jegindø, and it covered an area of 76 km^{2}. It had a total population of 3,577 (2005). Its last mayor was Peter Gade, a member of the Conservative People's Party (Det Konservative Folkeparti) political party. The main town and the site of its municipal council was the town of Hvidbjerg.

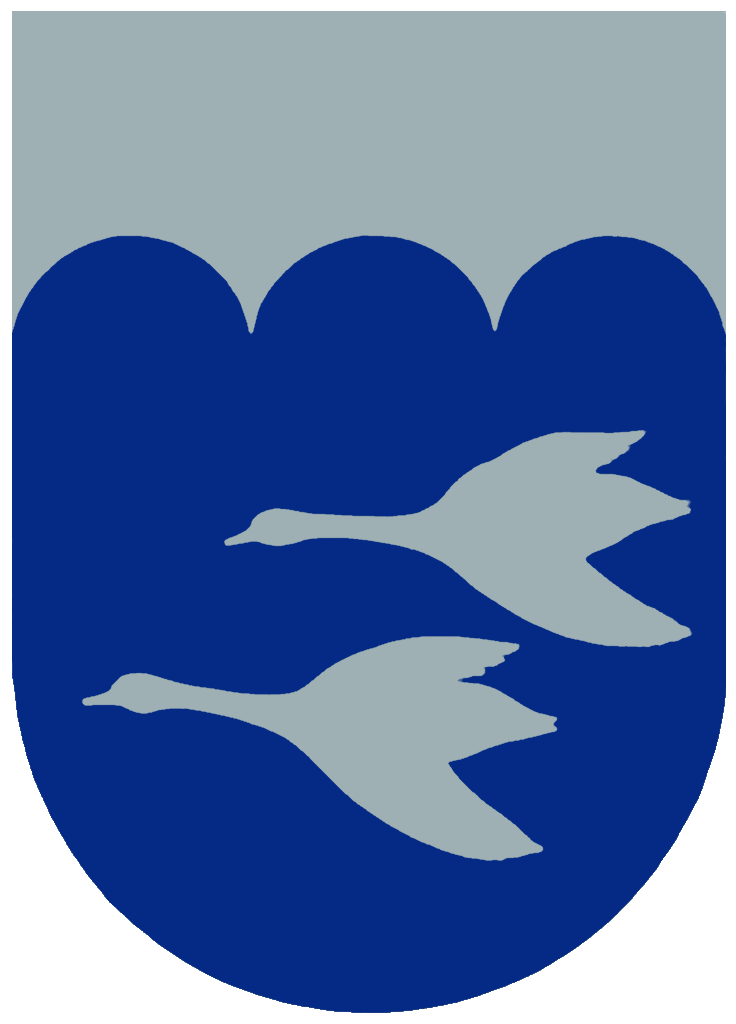
Coat of arm of former Thyholm Municipality

The municipality was located on Thyholm, a peninsula connected to Sydthy by a very narrow stretch of land and road, ca. 1.5 km long and .5 km wide. Except for this narrow land connection Thyholm was surrounded by the waters of the Limfjord, which separates the island of Vendsyssel-Thy on which Thyholm is located from the Jutland peninsula to the south. These waters defined most of the municipality's borders:

The 472 meter long Oddesund Bridge (Danish: Oddesundbroen) connects the former municipality at the town of Oddesund Nord to the town of Oddesund Syd.

The municipality was created in 1970 due to a kommunalreform ("Municipality Reform") that combined a number of existing parishes:

- Hvidbjerg Parish
- Jegindø Parish
- Lyngs Parish
- Odby Parish
- Søndbjerg Parish

Thyholm municipality ceased to exist as the result of Kommunalreformen ("The Municipality Reform" of 2007). It was merged into Struer Municipality. This created a municipality with an area of 248 km^{2} and a total population of 22,752 (2005). The new municipality belongs to Region Midtjylland ("Mid-Jutland Region").
