= Skive Airport =

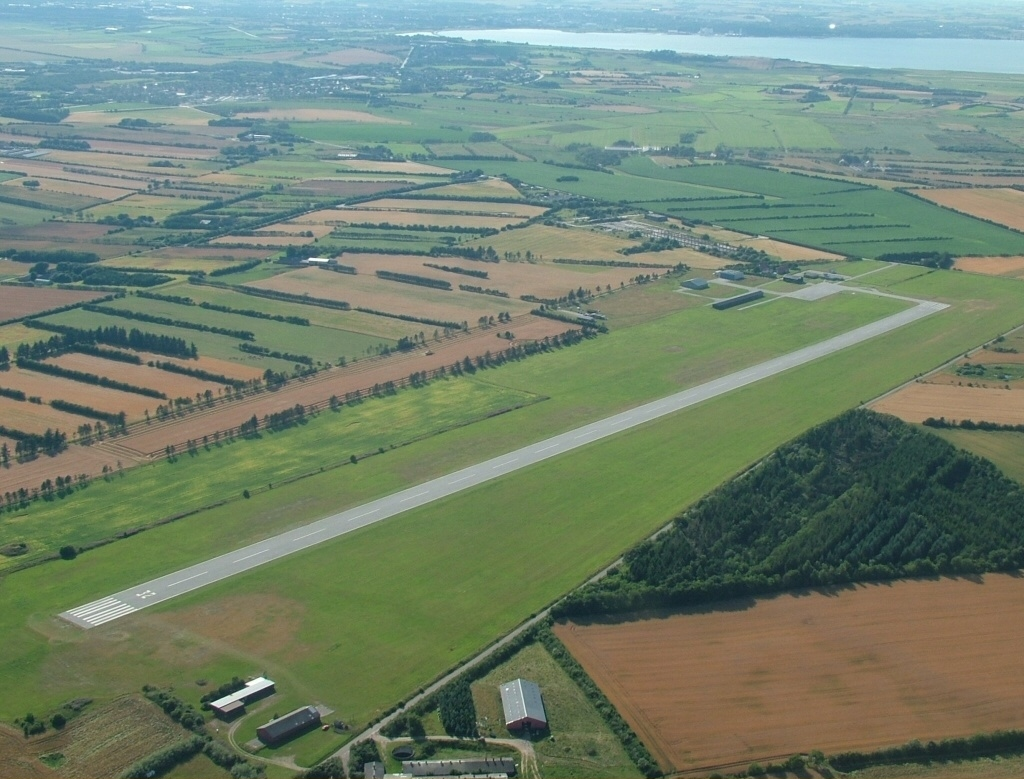
- IATA: SQW; ICAO: EKSV

Summary
- Location: Skive, Denmark
- Elevation AMSL: 74 ft / 23 m
- Coordinates: 56°33′0″N 9°10′22″E
- Interactive map of Skive Airport

Runways
Direction	Length		Surface
Direction	ft	m	Surface
14/32	3,933	1,199	Asphalt

Skive Airport is a regional private jet airport in Skive, Denmark.
