= Johan Skjoldborg =

Danish writer

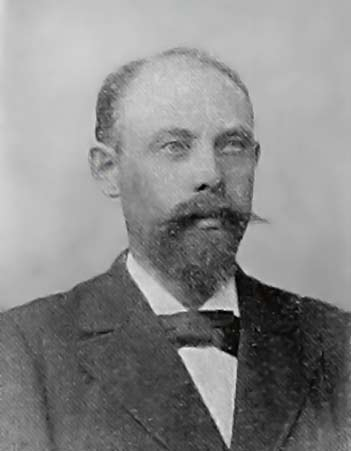
Johan Skjoldborg

Johan Skjoldborg (27 April 1861 – 22 February 1936) was a Danish educator, novelist, playwright and memoirist.

== Biography ==
Johan Martinus Nielsen Skjoldborg was born in the parish of Øsløs in Thisted in north Jutland, Denmark. He was educated in Nibe and later trained as a teacher at Ranum Seminarium in Ranum. He was employed as a school teacher until he resigned in 1902. In his later years he lived in a house which was donated to him in Løgstør. Johan Skjoldborg's childhood home in Øsløs was opened as a museum in 1961 on the centenary of his birth.

Among his works are the novel En Stridsmand from 1896, the play Slægten from 1925, and the two volumes Min Mindebog from 1934/1935.
