= Jeppe Aakjær =

Danish poet (1866–1930)

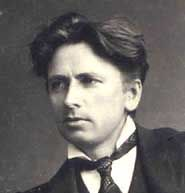
- Jeppe Aakjær
- Born: 10 September 1866; Fly, Jutland, Denmark
- Died: 22 April 1930 (aged 63); Jenle, Denmark
- Known for: Poetry, writer
- Notable work: Bondens Søn (1899) ("The Peasant's Son"); Vredens børn, et tyendes saga (1904) ("Children of Wrath: A Servant's Saga"); Fri felt (1905) ("Free Fields"); Rugens sange (1906) ("Songs of the Rye"); Livet paa Hegnsgaard (1907) ("Life at the Hegn Farm"); Hvor Bønder bor (1908) ("Where Farmers Live"); Arbejdets Glæde (1914) ("The Joy of Work"); Jens Langkniv (1915); Four poems of Jeppe Aakjær (1917); A book of Danish verse(1922); Heimdal's Wanderings (1924); Jeg er Havren ("I am the Oats"); Jutland; Historiens Sang ("The Song of History"); A World of Song(1941); The Jutland Wind(1944); A second book of Danish verse(1947); In Denmark I was born(1948); Songs from Denmark(1988)
- Movement: Jutland Movement
- Spouses: Marie Bregendahl; Nanna Krog

Jeppe Aakjær (10 September 1866 – 22 (23) April 1930) was a Danish poet and novelist, a member of the 'Jutland Movement' in Danish literature". A regionalist, much of his writings was about his native Jutland. He was known for writings that reflected his concern for the impoverished and for describing rural existence.

== Biographical information ==
Jeppe was born on 10 September 1866 in Fly, Jutland, a small village near Skive. He came from a large family as he was one of eight, born to Jens Peder Jensen and Catherine Marie. His father was a farmer and Jeppe at a young age learned the family trade. This sowed the seeds of his poetic existence. His early job was tending to cattle as a herdsboy. His father was a hard worker and a supporter of the Venstre party (liberal). This influenced Jeppe as he showed strong liberal leanings early on. His grandfather also resided at the farm where the family lived, in an arrangement called aftægt, which was where the parents cede ownership of the farm/business in trade for room and board until death. This system did not work well in many cases, and in Jeppe's family's case, his grandfather was tyrannical, a drunkard, and foul-mouthed. This also influenced him, as in later years he would rail against the system in his writing, in particular in Paa Aftægt: En Fortælling (In Retirement: A Story, 1907), Vredens Børn: Et Tyendes Saga (Children of Wrath: A Servant's Saga, 1907), and Bondens Søn: Skildringer fra Fjends Herred (The Peasant's Son: Pictures from the Fjend District, 1899)

== Education ==
Schooling, whereas the government of Denmark had made it mandatory for all children, was not important to most rural families, his being no exception. He initially spent more time working on the farm than at school. This changed in 1882, when a teacher by the name of Niels Jakobsen started teaching at the school at Fly. He convinced his parents to send him to Staby to attend one of the Folk High Schools. Then in 1884 his parents allowed him to travel to Copenhagen. He attended Blaagaard's Teacher's College. Here he studied intensively with Jakobsen to with the goal of obtaining his teacher degree. He did not finish as he left just after his preliminary exams.

== Early writing ==
His first experience with writing was while he attended the school in Staby, in 1883. He started contributing material for the journal Skattegraveren (The Treasure Hunter), which was edited by Evald Tang Kristensen. This journal specialized in folklore, of which Jeppe was fascinated with. Jeppe had, over the course of his youth, heard and remembered many stories, anecdotes, fables, and other literary short pieces. He, over the course of the next several years gathered and submitted hundreds of submissions. In all, over three hundred narratives, riddles, and songs were submitted, the majority of which were published. His book Jydske Folkeminder VIII: Sagn og Overtro fra Jylland (Jutlandic Folklore VIII: Legends and Superstitions from Jutland, 1886) contained at least 77 of these prior published works. He also submitted names for Evald to research more on his own and he shared his success by sending him copies of the journals for many years. This relationship would last a lifetime. He would use these early forays into writing throughout his career to fill many a page. His book Po fir glowend Pæl: Fra jen si bitte Tid: En Sagnsamling (On Four Glowing Posts: From My Childhood: A Myth Collection, 1923) was a compilation of 26 of these legends, set on a foggy night in Davbjærg Pass. With this and others he would demonstrate his ability at expressing the immediacy of the folk performance as well as the Jutlandic dialect. Another good example of the ability to meld folklore with legendary themes was his early book Jens Langkniv: Af Fjends Herreds Krønike bog (Jens Longknife: From the Chronicles of the Fjend District, 1915). In this book he showed his skill at the folktale mixing with historical aspects of 16th-century Danish witchcraft. This ability was not limited to his stories as he also demonstrated this in his poetry, for example in Bjergmands-snak (Mound-Dweller's Talk, 1949) a very long poem told by the mound-dweller.

== Career ==
=== Early works ===
While in Copenhagen for school, he became enamored with the big city and its cultural opportunities. Here he began to be influenced by other writers such as Brandes and Hørup, and also by politicians such as Jens Busk. In 1886, he left Copenhagen to spend time with his family on the farm and on other farms. It was during this time that he also began to tour and lecture at the Folk High Schools. His lectures had a political twist to them and he tried to "wake the spirit of resistance" within the laborers and farmers. The government felt at times that he crossed the line and became seditious and at the age of 20, he was sent to jail for speaking in Viborg. Being an outspoken socialist Aakjær joined the Social Democratic Party. He moved to Copenhagen and worked as a proofreader and journalist. In the winter of 1887-1888 Jeppe travelled to Askov, where he studied at the folk school. From there he moved to Elbæk, where he stayed until 1890. At Elbæk, he taught at the school, but after the short taste of teaching decided that that was not the life for him.

1890 saw him drafted into the military, where he was initially placed in the infantry at Skive. After a period of time he was relocated to Copenhagen, which also did not last long. Six weeks after his initial conscription, he was discharged due to vision problems. After his military career ended, he needed more money and tried his hand at teaching once again. He first returned to Elbæk into 1891, then moved to a school run by Morten Pontoppidan. In 1892, he again decided that the life of a teacher was not for him. He returned to Copenhagen to continue his education, this time in History. In 1893, he met and married Marie Bregendahl. This relationship, which produced one son, Svend, was not a highlight of his life and the seven years that he remained married to Marie were years he would rather forget. During these latter student years, he became more involved in the politics of the school, and was even elected to the executive committee. He held that position for several years. In 1895, he received his studentereksamen (bachelor's degree) and in 1896 his candidatus degree. He continued to study history at the University of Copenhagen for the next two years, after which he abandoned his academic career due to the economics of his life and started writing professionally. He then commenced to obtain his first jobs in the industry. He was hired, first, as a proofreader/copy editor, and, second, as a journalist.

=== Newspapers ===
His first job as a copy editor was at the Left Reform newspaper Politiken, which was run by Edvard Brandes. While working at this newspaper, Jeppe first made a name for himself with his Missionen og dens Høvding (The Mission and its Chieftain, 1897). In this piece, he attacks the concept of Christianity in general, and in particular goes after the Lutheran movement of Vilhelm Beck, called the Inner Mission. Here he postulates the danger involved in it, partly for the fact that it was becoming rural in nature and appearing in the areas that he loved. Brandes was impressed with his work and promoted him to contributor (journalist). After some time he switched to the newspaper København, where he spent a few uneventful years. In 1899, after switching again, this time to Provinspresse, a social democratic publication, he became a parliamentary correspondent and started to make more of a name for himself. He remained with this paper until 1903. Later in life, Jeppe would not look back fondly on his time as a newspaper man, as he felt they robbed him of his productivity. He did however keep a lasting relationship with Brandes, who continued to give good reviews to his books.

In 1899, he wrote his first major literary piece, Bondens Søn (The Peasant's Son), in which in an autobiographical manner relates the story of a poor Jutlander, Jens. Jens moves to Copenhagen and battles with the conservative Christianity that was instilled in him by his grandfather. In time Jens returns home with a girlfriend in tow, but rather than a glorious homecoming, he receives instead the feelings of provincialism and negativity towards the freedoms of the big city. In time he inherits his fathers farm, marries his hometown sweetheart, but never gives into the traditional peasant culture. Some critics regarded the piece as naive, it is Jeppe's first attempt at melding cultural and political issues into one.

=== Literary Success ===
Aakjær tried to get the publishing firm of Gyldendal to partner with him, but was initially rebuffed, even though he was sought after by one of its editors, Peter Nansen. Instead he found a local bookstore owner, V. Oscar Søtofte, who published his first novel. Soon thereafter, he released a collection of earlier writing, Derude fra Kjærne (Out There from the Watering Holes, 1899). In time a rift formed between the two over a couple of issues. First, Aakjær did not like the choice of covers that Oscar had chosen. Second, he felt that the marketing ability of Oscar was severely limited, and finally, when Jeppe wanted to release a collection of shorts stories as a single book, Oscar objected and instead broke it into two. (Note: The first of the two was the only one that Oscar ended up publishing.) The collection, Vadmelsfolk: Hedefortællinger (Homespunfolk: Heath Stories, 1900) was released around Christmas 1900, but saw lackluster sales which forced Jeppe to seek a new publisher.

Gyldendal, who now had seen the strength of his writing had no problem forming a relationship with Jeppe, and they started by releasing the second of the short story collection, Fjandboer: Fortællingen fra Heden (Fjand Dwellers: Stories from Heden, 1901). Over time nearly all of his remaining books were to be published by Gyldendal, with one notable exception, Pigen fra Limfjorden: Roman (The Girl from Limfjord: Novel, 1921), which he published with a small publisher, Danske Forfatteres Forlag. His relationship with Gyldendal was not always good as in time he grew to resent them and felt they were too demanding. He also did not, initially, have a good agreement with them, as he was allotted 150 kroner advance each month (enough to keep him above the subsistence level). However, with this advance he needed to produce a substantial amount of work, which he was not successful in doing. In time he was in substantial debt to the publisher, in the amount of 8,000 kroner. One thing that he managed to do was keep the rights to all of his works, which was not normal in this era.

The turn of the century saw Jeppe embarking on an endeavor that would take a few years to accomplish and most of his time. This project was the biography of Steen Steensen Blicher. With the support of Gyldendal, he spent countless hours, weeks, and months perusing archives, throughout the country. The work, Steen Steensen Blichers Livs-Tragedie i Breve og Aktstykker (Steen Steensen Blicher's Life Tragedy in Letters and Documents, 1903-1904) was released in subscription style with a total of 36 volumes. The piece was not financially successful; however, in time it came known to be a literary masterpiece, and a major contribution to Danish literary history. His next project deviated from his typical fare and in 1905 and 1906, he released a series of poetic pieces: Fri Felt: En Digstamlin (Open Field: A Poem Collection, 1905), Rugens Sange og Andre Digte (Songs of the Rye and Other Poems, 1906). The second book was generally considered to be his best work ever, and it contains Jens Langkniv (Jens Longknife). He wrote these poems while living with friends, and instead of a political slant, they dealt with the beauty of rural life. He would later reminisce about inspiration for the poems being long walks by himself, where he would stamp out the rhythm with his feet as he was creating the words. A lot of the inspiration came from Robert Burns, who Jeppe felt was able to capture the nuances of rural dialect, the beauty of the land, the emotions of the farmers life, and the day-to-day rhythms of the existence. In his piece, Esper Tækki: En Sallingbo-Empe (Esper Tækki: A Salling Imp, 1913), he drew on Robert Burns' poem Tam O'Shanter.

In 1906, Aakjær received the fellowship, Anckerske Legat (Anckerske Scholarship), and commenced to tour Europe with his friend Lauritz Larsen. After a period of time on the continent, he went to Scotland by himself to connect with and be inspired by Robert Burn's work. It was during this trip that he suffered a relapse of a chronic digestive illness. This prevented him from spending much more time touring and he would only get one more chance to travel. In 1913, he was able to tour Germany, the Netherlands, Belgium, and England, with his son. In this latter trip, it was again cut short, this time by a painful foot blister and he skipped his Scotland portion.

=== Poetry ===
In 1907, he turned a swath of land that he had purchased in 1905 into his farm, Jenle. He then, that same year, married for the second time, this time to Nanna Krog, an artist. This marriage was the opposite of his first, as it was happy and long. Together they had two children, Esben, a son, and Solvejg, a girl. 1908, saw the state issuing him an 800 kroner stipend annually, which along with his publishing money ensured financial security. In 1910, Jeppe started what would become an annual event, the Jenlefest, a folk festival. These would become famous for their mix of politics, literary figures, and farmers. They would continue until 1929. 1907, also saw him branch into the dramatic, as he wrote the piece, Livet paa Hegnsgaard: Bondekomedie i fire Akter (Life at Hegns Farm: Rural Comedy in Four Acts). The play was originally written (most of it) in 1901, but was rejected by the Folketeater (People's Theater) in Copenhagen. When a friend convinced him to finish in it 1907, it became a commercial success, even though he was not very happy with the actor's ability to capture the nuances of Jutland. His next play, Ulvens Søn: Skuespil i fire Akter (The Wolf's Son: Play in Four Acts, 1909) brought with it social ideas similar to Vredens Børn. In 1911 he released what he felt was his best play, Naar Bønder elsker: Skuespil i femn Akter (When Peasant's Love: Play in Five Acts, 1911), which did not receive as good a reception as his earlier plays. His last two plays, Himmelbjærgpræsten: Et Skuespil (The Minister of Himmelbjæarg: A Play, 1917) and Rejsegildet: Skuespil i 5 Akter (The Going-Away Party: Play in 5 Acts, 1925) were never performed.

In 1911, he published his most controversial work, Af Gammel Jehannes hans Bivelskistaarri: En bette Bog om stur' Folk (From Old Jehanne's Bible Stories: A Little Book about Big Folk, 1911), where he retells biblical stories per a narrator who changes them to suit the Jutlandic dialect and also to fit the social and cultural environment. Critics claimed the work was blasphemous, whereas he felt that it made the Biblical stories more accessible. He continued to write with religious and socially critical themes with, among others, Hvor der er gjærende Kræfter: Landarbejderroman (Where There are Fermenting Powers: Farmworker Novel, 1916), Af min Hjemstavns Saga: Lidt Bondehistorie (From My Provincial Sage: Little Farmer Story, 1919). He also continued to write his idyllic poetry in several collections, Vejr og Vind og Folkesind: Digte (Rain and Wind and Folkspirit: Poems, 1916), Hjærtegræs og Ærenpris: Digtsamling (Quaking Grass and Speedwell: Poem Collection, 1921), and Under Aftenstjernen: Digte (Under the Evening Star: Poems, 1927).

=== Death ===
As he neared the end of his life, Jeppe focused more on his memoirs and also historical writing. His memoirs filled four volumes, Fra min Bitte-Tid: En Kulturhistorisk Sevbiografi (From My Childhood: A Cultural Historical Autobiography, 1928), Drengeaar og Knøseaar: Kilderne Springer og Bækken gaar (Boyhood Years and Laddish Years: The Wells Spring and the Stream Flows, 1929), Før det dages: Minder fra Halvfemserne (Before Dawn: Memories from the Nineties, 1929), and Efterladte Erindringer: Fra Tiden Omkring Aarhundred-Skiflet og Fremefter (Posthumous Memories: From Times around the Turn of the Century and Afterwards, 1934). Most of his autobiographical works were written while sick in bed from a bout with gangrene. He died two years later from a heart attack.

== Jutland Movement ==
As a member of the so-called Jutland Movement, his focus in writing was on his native land. Others in the group included Johannes V. Jensen and Jakob Knudsen. Rather than forming a physical group they were grouped by their love of their native land and their love of writing about that land. As Jeppe grew older he wondered why the movement never had an actual leader. He states in his memoirs',

Alle de andre Litteraturretninger havde fra første Færd haft en Fører. Romantikken havde Johan Ludvig Heiberg og adskillige andre. Realism fra '70erne havde altid Georg Brandes, den utrætteligste Lansedrager, for den ny Tid. Halvfemsernes Maaneskindsmænd havde C. E. Jensen ... Men den jydske Retning fik ikke sin egen Kritiker. Den Mand kom aldrig frem og har ikke vist sig endnu, der forstod den inderste Nerve i den jydske Retnings Litteratur. All the other Literary Movements had from the beginning a guide. Romanticism had Johan Ludvig Heiberg and assorted others. Realism from the 1870s had Georg Brandes, the most tireless point man for the new age. Nineties moonlight men had CE Jensen ... But the Jutlandic School never had his own critic. That man never came forward and still has not to this very day, who understood the inner nerve in the Jutland School's Literature.

== Notable works ==
Aakjær's notable novels, including Bondens Søn ("The Peasant's Son") (1899) and Vredens børn, et tyendes saga ("Children of Wrath: A Hired Man's Saga") (1904), reveal his staunch social commitment. The latter is a rural Danish answer to Upton Sinclair's The Jungle and in many ways caused the same effect but on a lesser scale. He also wrote Hvor Bønder bor ("Where Farmers Live") (1908), Arbejdets Glæde ("The Joy of Work") (1914), and Jens Langkniv (1915), about a Danish highwayman becoming a guerrilla fighter against the Germans in the 17th century. Many tales and short stories tell about the humble, bad life of farm boys and grooms and are written with a visceral anger and a fighting spirit. He also wrote some plays, such as Livet paa Hegnsgaard, ("Life at the Hegn Farm") (1907), and a biography on his predecessor, Steen Steensen Blicher.

Today, it is his poetry for which he is chiefly known. His poems, including the famous Fri felt ("Free Fields"; 1905), the Rugens sange ("Songs of the Rye"; 1906) and Heimdal's Wanderings (1924), reveal his appreciation for the harvest. Because of their lyrical quality, many of these poems were used as settings for songs by various 20th Century Scandinavian composers, such as Carl Nielsen. (Note: "...his 'Jens Vejmand' (music by Carl Nielsen) is virtually a modern folk song.") In these songs he sings of the moors of his region, the areas of his childhood and the poor life in the country, often switching between harsh realism, a fresh love of nature and sentimental nostalgia. Some of his poems are written in dialect. Among his best known are the beloved Jeg er Havren ("I am the Oats"); Jens Vejmand, a tribute to the worn-out roadmender; Jutland (English translation by J. A. Peehl); and Historiens Sang ("The Song of History"). As a poet, he shows himself an agitator, writing battle songs for the working class.

Aakjær is one of the most popular Danish poets of the 20th Century. As a Jutlandish regionalist and dialect writer, he is considered to be the heir of Blicher. Aakjær was also inspired by Robert Burns, whose Auld lang syne he translated into Jutlandish dialect. Together with Johannes Vilhelm Jensen and Martin Andersen Nexø, Aakjær is considered a "new realist" from the 1910s. Some consider him a literary figure of transition between old rural culture and modern socialist agitation. As a castigator of society, he was popular, even among his opponents.

His first wife was the author Marie Bregendahl, known for her regionalist works.

== The Oats ==
Aakjær's poem Havren (The Oats) was first published in his poetry collection "Vejr og Vind og Folkesind" from 1916. As his other poetry, it is mostly a salute to nature, in contrast to his otherwise very political agitation and writing. Havren is a poem in twelve verses, and a melody was composed for it in 1917 by Aksel Agerby. Today, only seven or eight of the original twelve verses are sung, and the song is often referred to as Jeg er havren (I am the oats).

Original poem in Danish

HAVREN

Jeg er Havren. Jeg har Bjælder paa,
mer end tyve, tror jeg, paa hvert Straa.
Bonden kalder dem for mine Fold.
Gud velsigne ham, den Bondeknold!

Jeg blev saaet, mens glade Lærker sang
over grønne Banker Dagen lang;
Humlen brumled dybt sin Melodi,
og et Rylefløjt gled ind deri.

Viben fløj om Brak og Pløjemand
og slog Kryds for baade Plov og Spand.
Kryds slog Bonden ogsaa over mig
for at gi’ mig Helse med paa Vej.

Mens i Dug jeg groede Fod for Fod,
groede Sangen sammen med min Rod;
den, som ydmyg lægger Øret til,
hører Lærkens Triller i mit Spil.

Det kan kolde Hjærner ej forstaa
Jeg er Lærkesangen paa et Straa,
Livets Rytme døbt i Sommerdræ,
mer end Gumlekost for Øg og Fæ.

Søndenvinden, o! han har mig kjær;
derfor kan han aldrig la’ mig vær’,
smyger sig med Hvisken til mig ind
nu ved højre, nu ved venstre Kind.

Naar han puster paa min gule Top,
maa jeg vugge med ham ned og op,
indtil alle mine Bjælder gaar,
som naar gyldne Hamre sammen slaar.

Juniregnen gjorde myg min Muld,
Julisolen gav mig af sit Guld,
Sundhed risler mig i Top og Skaft.
Det er derfra Plagen har sin Kraft.

Jeg er Ven med Dug og Grødevejr,
Ven med Landets lyse Bøgetræer,
Ven med al den danske Sæd, som gror
øst for Hav som vest for Sund og Fjord.

Jeg faar Solens sidste lange Blink,
før den dukker ned bag gullig Brink,
og naar Aftenklokken ringer Fred,
staar jeg paa min Taa og ringler med.

Jeg skal ringle Barnet til dets Seng,
ringle Taagen op af Sump og Eng,
ringle Freden over Hjemmet ind,
ringle Bønnen frem i fromme Sind.

Jeg er Havren. Mine Bjælder gaar
over lyse Vange Aar for Aar,
ringler om, hvor Sang og Kjærve gror
herligt sammen paa den danske Jord.

Jeppe Aakjær

Trimmed poem in Danish

JEG ER HAVREN

Jeg er havren. Jeg har bjælder på,
mer end tyve, tror jeg, på hvert strå.
Bonden kalder dem for mine fold.
Gud velsigne ham, den bondeknold!

Jeg blev sået, mens glade lærker sang
over grønne banker dagen lang;
humlen brumled dybt sin melodi,
og et rylefløjt gled ind deri.

Mens i dug jeg groede fod for fod,
groede sangen sammen med min rod;
den, som ydmyg lægger øret til,
hører lærkens triller i mit spil.

Det kan kolde hjerner ej forstå:
Jeg er lærkesangen på et strå,
livets rytme døbt i sommerdræ,
mer end gumlekost for øg og fæ.

Jeg er ven med dug og grødevejr.
ven med landets lyse bøgetræer,
ven med al den danske sæd, som gror
øst for hav og vest for sund og fjord.

Jeg får solens sidste lange blink,
før den dukker ned bag gullig brink,
og når aftenklokken ringer fred,
står jeg på min tå og ringler med.

Jeg skal ringle barnet til dets seng,
ringle tågen op af sump og eng,
ringle freden over hjemmet ind,
ringle bønnen frem i fromme sind.

Jeg er havren. Mine bjælder går
over lyse vange år for år,
ringler om, hvor sang og kærve gror
herligt sammen på den danske jord.

Højskolesangbogen
(v. 3 and 6-8 are left out)

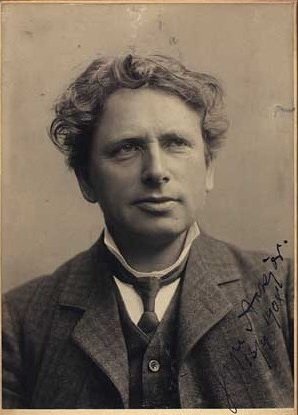
Jeppe Aakjær 1908
