= Marie Bregendahl =

Danish writer

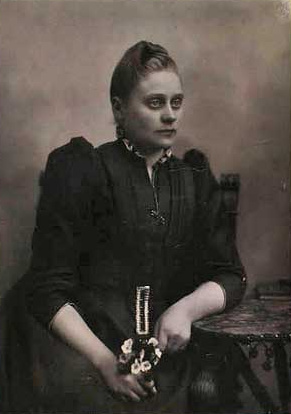
- Born: 6 November 1867; Fly, Denmark
- Died: 22 July 1940 (aged 72); Copenhagen
- Occupation: author
- Known for: Novel En dødsnat, 1912 (A Night of Death)

Marie Bregendahl née Sørensen (6 November 1867 – 22 July 1940) was a Danish author. She is one of Denmark's most acclaimed authors of rural literature whose novels and short stories were written in a realistic, almost grotesque style.

== Biography ==
Born on the Bregendahl estate in Fly near Skive in Jutland, Bregendahl continued her education in Copenhagen where in 1894 she married the widely acclaimed poet Jeppe Aakjær who had been her neighbour in Jutland. They had a son, Svend, in 1894, but the marriage was dissolved in 1900. Bregendahl turned to literature for a living. Her first novel, Hendrik i Bakken (Hendrik of the Hill) in 1904, portrayed the marital difficulties of an introvert whose wife rejects his advances. Bregendahl went on to gain fame with En Dødsnat (translated as A Night of Death) in 1912, based on the death of her mother when she was only 12. Completed in 1923, her eight-volume work Billeder af Sødalsfolkenes liv (Pictures from the Life of the People of Sødal) is deemed to be her most significant contribution to literature, presenting the day-to-day lives of West Jutland farmers in a late 19th century village community.

== List of works ==
- Hendrik i Bakken (novel, 1904)
- En dødsnat (novel, 1912), translated as A Night of Death (1931)
- I de lyse nætter (short stories, 1920)
- I håbets skær (short stories, 1924)
- Thora (short stories, 1926)
- Med åbne sind (short stories, 1926)
- Den blinde rytter (short stories, 1927)
- Når jul er nær (short stories, 1927)
- Holger Hauge og hans hustru (novel, 1934–35)
- Sødalsfolkene (short stories, 1935)
- Møllen og andre fortællinger (short stories, 1936)
- Filtret høst (poetry, 1937)
- Birgitte Borg (unfinished novel, 1941)

== Bibliography ==
- Bregendahl, Marie (1931). A Night of Death. A. A. Knopf.
