= Danish literature =

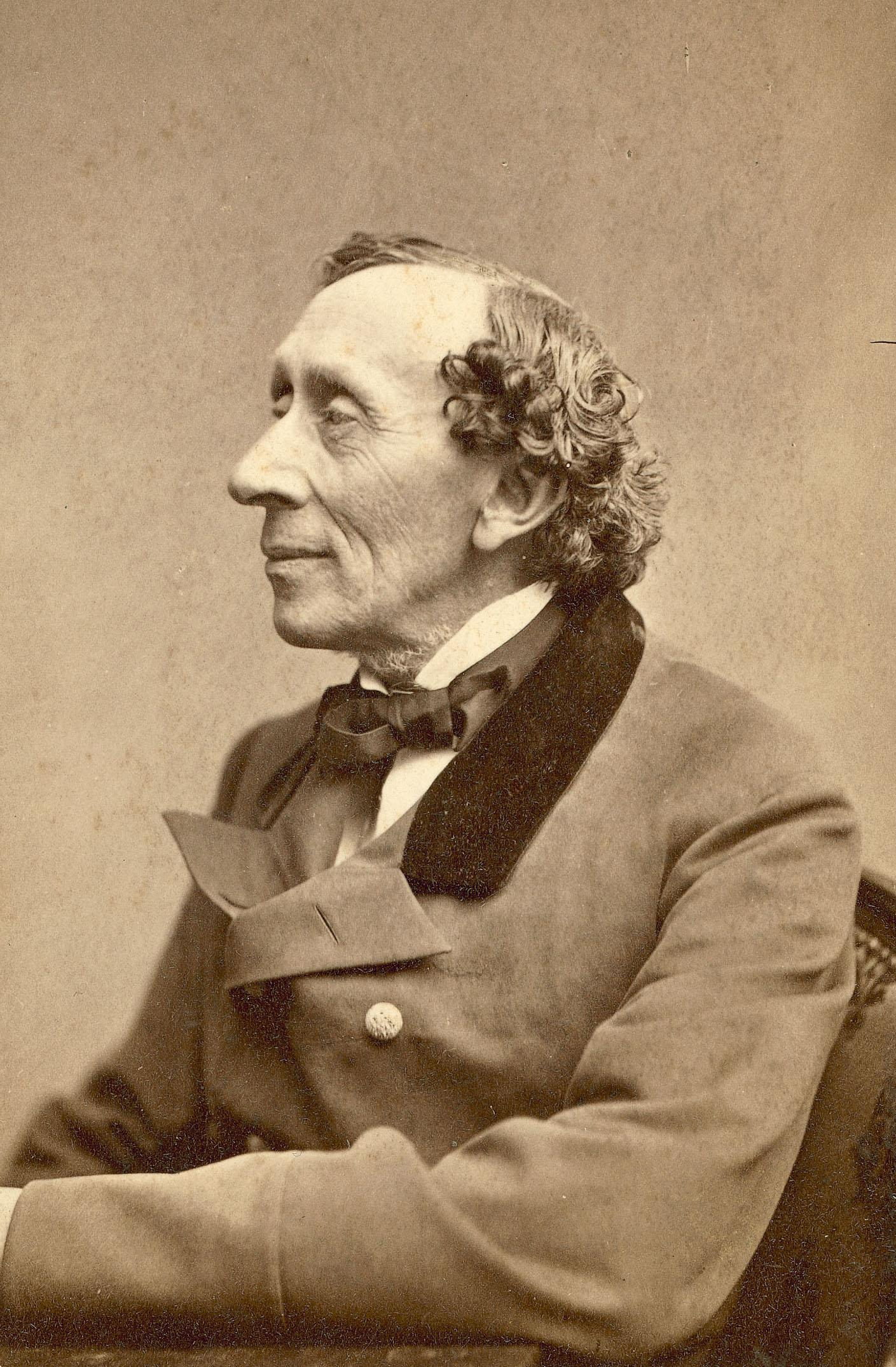
Hans Christian Andersen (1805–1875)

Danish literature (Danish: Dansk litteratur) stretches back to the Middle Ages. The earliest preserved texts from Denmark are runic inscriptions on memorial stones and other objects, some of which contain short poems in alliterative verse. In the late 12th century Saxo Grammaticus wrote Gesta Danorum. During the 16th century, the Lutheran Reformation came to Denmark. During this era, Christiern Pedersen translated the New Testament into Danish and Thomas Kingo composed hymns. Fine poetry was created in the early 17th century by Anders Arrebo (1587–1637). The challenges faced during Denmark's absolute monarchy in 1660 are chronicled in Jammersminde (Remembered Woes) by Leonora Christina of the Blue Tower. Ludvig Holberg (1684–1754), influenced by the ideas of the Enlightenment and Humanism, is considered the founder of modern Danish and Norwegian literature. Neoclassical poetry, drama, and the essay flourished during the 18th century influenced by French and English trends. German influence is seen in the verse of the leading poets of the late 18th century such as Johannes Ewald and Jens Baggesen. Other 18th century writers include the hymn writer Hans Adolph Brorson and the satirical poet Johan Herman Wessel.

During Denmark's Golden Age (1800–1850), literature centred on Romantic thinking, with authors such as philosopher Henrik Steffens (1773–1845) and the poet Bernhard Severin Ingemann (1789–1862). One of the most important figures in Danish literary culture was Nikolaj Grundtvig (1783–1872). Hans Christian Andersen (1805–1875) is remembered first and foremost for his fairy tales, written between 1835 and 1872. Søren Kierkegaard (1813–1855) was an existentialist philosopher and a theologian. Jens Peter Jacobsen (1847–1885) began the naturalist movement in Denmark with his romantic, melancholic poems. The Modern Breakthrough was a Scandinavian movement influenced by naturalism towards the end of the 19th century (1870–1890), led by Georg Brandes (1842–1927). Other writers include Holger Drachmann (1846–1908), Herman Bang (1857–1912), and Sophus Schandorph (1836–1901).

Henrik Pontoppidan (1857–1943) became a Nobel prize winner in 1917 for his "authentic descriptions of present-day life in Denmark". The 20th century began with reactions against the naturalist movement, moving instead towards nationalism. A national conservative trend was embodied in the works of Kaj Munk (1898–1944) and Valdemar Rørdam (1872–1946). Modern realism was practiced by Bang and J.P. Jacobsen. Social realism was practiced by Hans Kirk (1898–1962) and Martin Andersen Nexø (1869–1954). Jeppe Aakjær (1866–1930), Johannes Jørgensen (1866–1956) and Nobel prize-winner Johannes V. Jensen (1873–1950) brought a new dimension to Danish literature. Karen Blixen (1885–1962), who also used the pen name "Isak Dinesen" is notable for her memoir Out of Africa (1937).

Important post-WW II authors include Tove Ditlevsen (1917–1976), Klaus Rifbjerg (1931–2015), Dan Turèll (1946–1993), Leif Davidsen (born 1950), Bjarne Reuter (born 1950), Peter Høeg (born 1957), Jens Christian Grøndahl (born 1959), Benny Andersen (1929–2018), Anders Bodelsen (1937–2021), Elsebeth Egholm (born 1960), Christian Kampmann (1939–1988), Dea Trier Mørch (1941–2001), Jakob Ejersbo (1968–2008), Jussi Adler-Olsen (born 1950), and Birgithe Kosovic (born 1972). Among today's most successful authors are Leif Davidsen who writes gripping spy stories with a political extension, Bjarne Reuter with his intriguing novels for younger readers and Jens Christian Grøndahl whose love stories with a psychological twist include "Silence in October" and "An Altered Light".

== Middle Ages ==
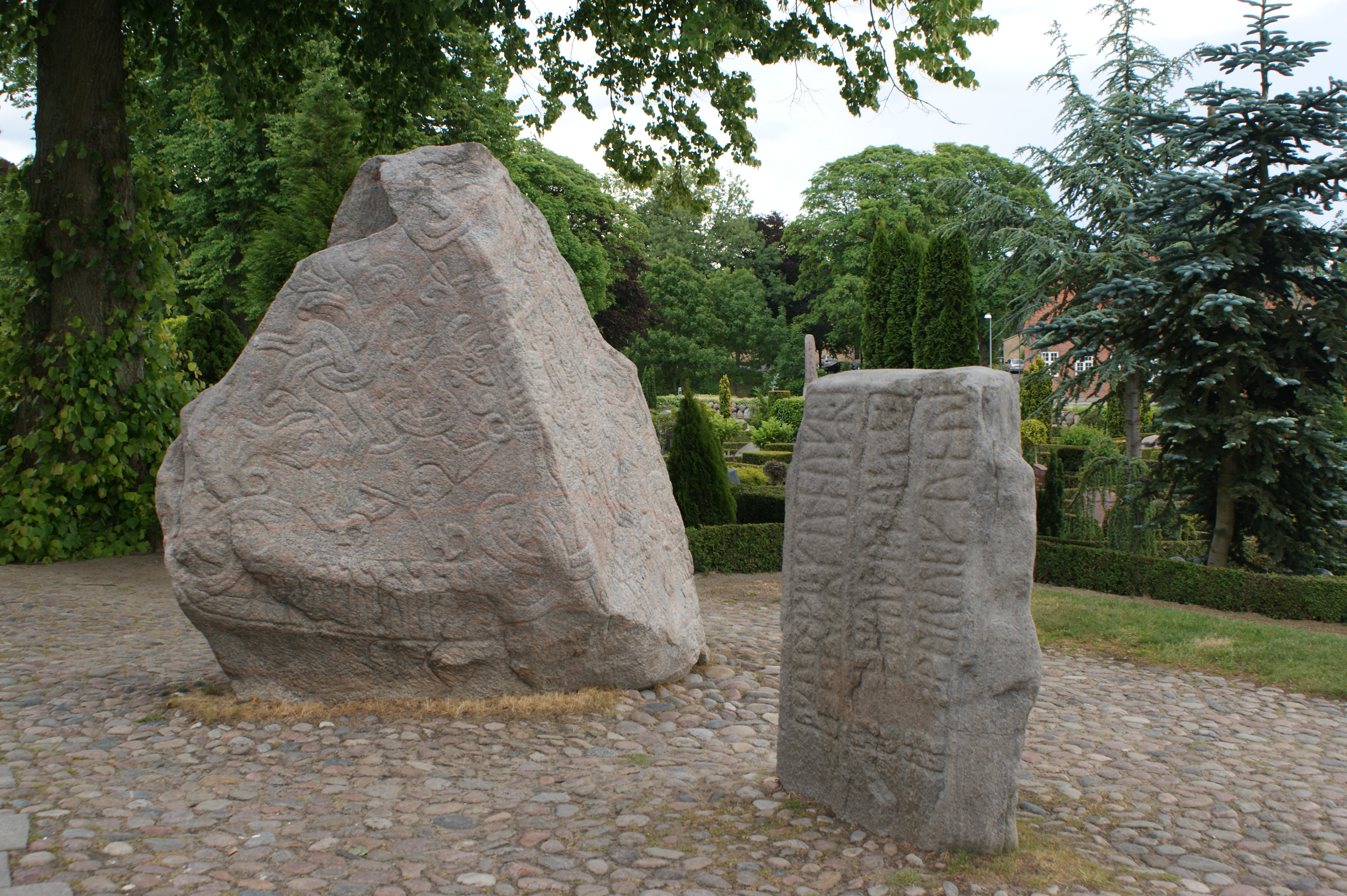
The runestones at Jelling

The earliest preserved texts from Denmark are runic inscriptions on memorial stones and other objects. Some of them contain short poems in alliterative verse.

The advent of Christianity in the 10th century brought Denmark into contact with European learning, including the Latin language and alphabet, but it was not until the late 12th century that this was to bear significant literary fruit in Gesta Danorum, an ambitious historical work by Saxo Grammaticus. Saxo's work is an important primary source for the study of Scandinavian myths and legends as well as a lively account of Danish history up to the author's own time. Other medieval literary works include the Danish ballads, recorded since the 16th century by aristocratic ladies in their manuscript albums. These led to the "Book of a Hundred Ballads (1591) published by Anders Sørensen Vedel, "Collection Tragica" (1695) by Metter Gøya and the "Book of a Hundred Ballads" by Peter Syv in 1695.

== 16th and 17th centuries ==
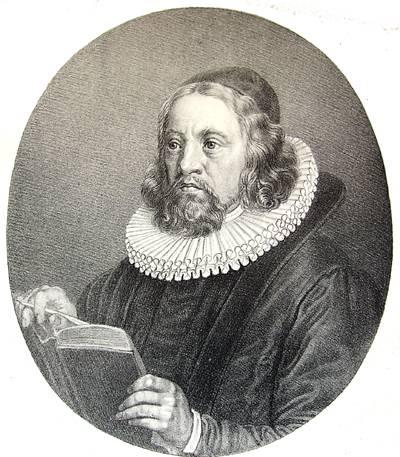
Thomas Kingo (1634–1703)

The 16th century brought the Lutheran Reformation to Denmark and a new period in the nation's literature. Major authors of the time include the humanist Christiern Pedersen, who translated the New Testament into Danish, and Poul Helgesen who vigorously opposed the Reformation. The 16th century also saw Denmark's earliest plays, including the works of Hieronymus Justesen Ranch. The 17th century was an era of renewed interest in Scandinavian antiquities with scholars like Ole Worm at the forefront. Though religious dogmatism was on the rise the passionate hymns of Thomas Kingo transcended the genre with personal expression.

Fine poetry was created in the early 17th century by Anders Arrebo (1587–1637). He is remembered in particular for Hexaemeron, a poem describing the six days of the Creation (c. 1622), published posthumously

External struggles with Sweden and internal rivalries among the nobility leading to Denmark's absolute monarchy in 1660 are chronicled from a royal prisoner's redemptive perspective in Jammersminde (Remembered Woes), in the heartfelt prose of Leonora Christina of the Blue Tower, written 1673–1698, but first published in 1869.

== 18th century ==
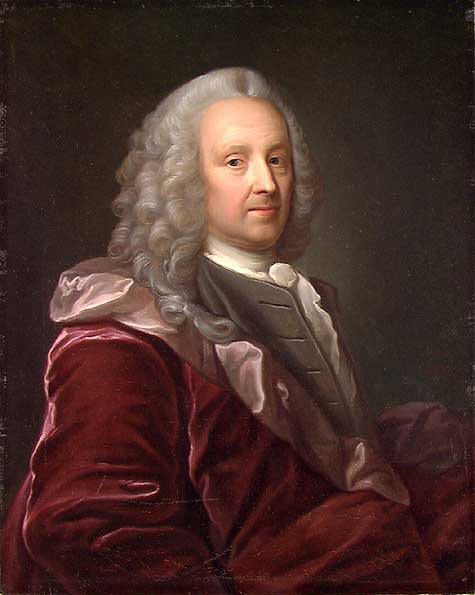
Ludvig Holberg (1684–1754) painted by Jørgen Roed

Ludvig Holberg (1684–1754), influenced by the ideas of the Enlightenment and Humanism, is considered the founder of modern Danish and Norwegian literature. He is best known for the comedies he wrote in 1722–1728. Among the most popular are Jean de France and Erasmus Montanus, both in the satirical style of Molière with pretentious, stereotyped characters. The first is about a Dane who, after picking up notions of the French language and lifestyle while in Paris, tries to impress his countrymen on his return to Denmark. The second presents Rasmus Berg, the son of a farmer. On completing his college education, he Latinized his name to Montanus and became a menace to his family and neighbours with all he has learned.

Neoclassical poetry, drama, and the essay flourished during the 18th century influenced by French and English trends. German influence is seen in the verse of the leading poets of the late 18th century such as Johannes Ewald and Jens Baggesen.

Other 18th century writers include the pietist hymn writer Hans Adolph Brorson and the witty, satirical poet Johan Herman Wessel.

== 19th century ==
=== The Golden Age ===
During Denmark's Golden Age (1800–1850), literature centred on Romantic thinking. It was introduced in 1802 by the philosopher Henrik Steffens who gave a successful series of lectures at Elers Kollegium. He presented the main themes of German romanticism, emphasising the relationship between nature, history and mankind. The movement was maintained by the romanticists, especially Adam Oehlenschläger (1779–1850). Remembered today for his Digte (1803) and Poetiske Skrifter (1805), Oehlenschläger quickly became the leading poet in Denmark. Bernhard Severin Ingemann (1789–1862) also published a collection of romantic poems before producing first a number of plays, then a successful series of novels and finally a number of fine religious poems which, after being set to music, became an important addition to the hymns sung in Danish churches.

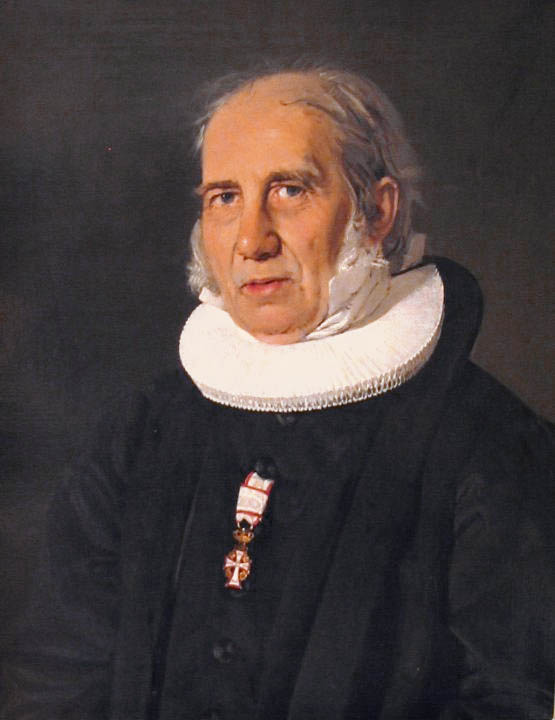
Nikolaj Grundtvig by Christian Albrecht Jensen

One of the most important figures in Danish literary culture was Nikolaj Grundtvig (1783–1872) who instilled a growing spirit of nationalism based initially on his Northern Mythology (1808) and his long drama, The Fall of the Heroic Life in the North (1809). In addition to a huge stream of articles and poems, he wrote a number of books, including two histories of the world (1814 and 1817), the long historical poem Roskilde-Riim (Rhyme of Roskilde) (1813), and a book-sized commentary, Roskilde Saga. Grundtvig's hymn book effected a great change in Danish church services, substituting the hymns of the national poets for the slow measures of the orthodox Lutherans. In all Grundtvig wrote or translated about 1,500 hymns, including "God's Word Is Our Great Heritage", most of which are still frequently sung today.

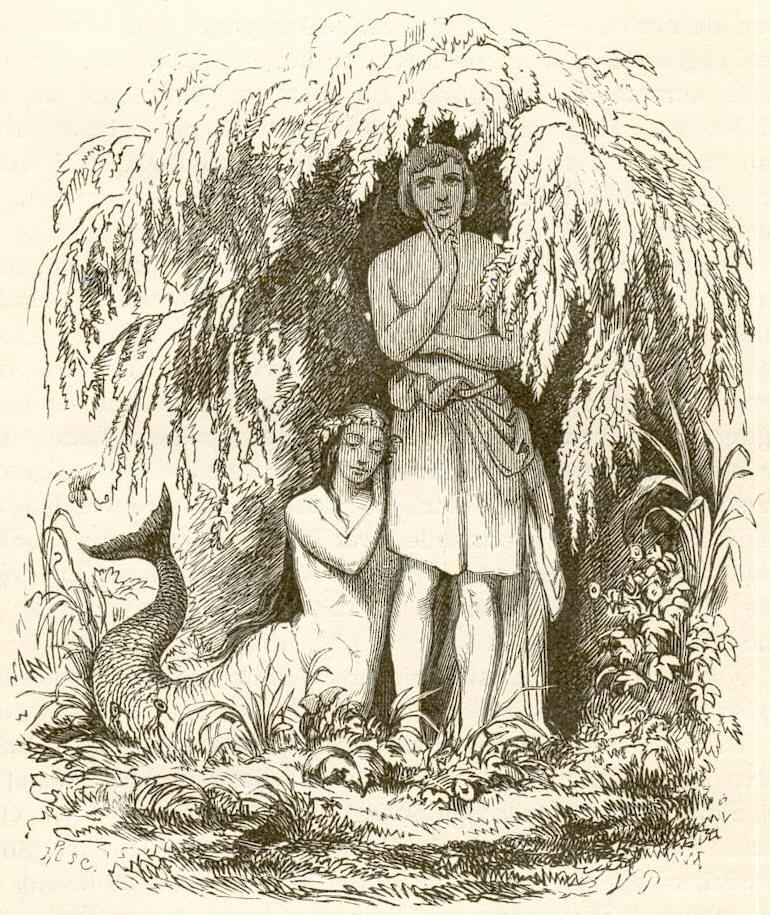
The Little Mermaid: illustration by Vilhelm Pedersen

Hans Christian Andersen (1805–1875) is remembered first and foremost for his fairy tales, written between 1835 and 1872 not only for children but for adults too. Among the most popular are "The Steadfast Tin Soldier", "The Snow Queen", "The Little Mermaid", "Thumbelina", "The Little Match Girl", and "The Ugly Duckling". Considered to be the father of the modern fairytale, Andersen wrote a total of 156 fairy stories, only 12 of which drew on folk tales. But Andersen also wrote a number of travel sketches, several novels including the well-received: "The Improvisatore" (1835), a series of poems, and his autobiography "The Fairy Tale of My Life" (1855).

Søren Kierkegaard (1813–1855) was an existentialist philosopher and a theologian. Much of his philosophical work deals with the issues of how one lives, focusing on the priority of concrete human reality over abstract thinking and highlighting the importance of personal choice and commitment. His principal aesthetic works include Either/Or (Enten-Eller) (1843), Philosophical Fragments (Philosophiske Smuler) (1844), Stages on Life's Way (Stadier paa Livets Vei) (1845) and Concluding Unscientific Postscript to Philosophical Fragments (Afsluttende uvidenskabelig Efterskrift) (1846). Opposing Hegelian philosophy, they promote the existential approach which raises the individual's awareness of God but intensifies his despair at not being able to achieve eternal truth. His religious works include Works of Love (Kjerlighedens Gjerninger) (1847) and Practice in Christianity (Indøvelse i Christendom) (1850).

=== Modern Breakthrough ===
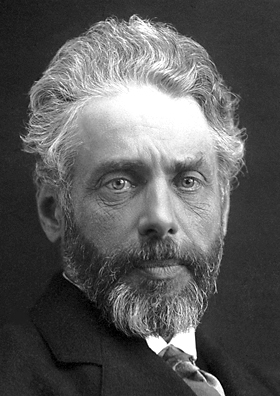
Nobel lauriate Henrik Pontoppidan

Modern Breakthrough was a strong Scandinavian movement covering naturalism and debating literature towards the end of the 19th century (1870–1890), replacing romanticism. The Danish theorist Georg Brandes (1842–1927) is often considered to be the "wire-puller" behind the movement. During the Modern Breakthrough, authors revolted against old traditions, especially romanticism, introducing an increasingly international outlook, a freer view of sexuality and religion, along with interest in scientific breakthroughs such as Darwinism. Literature focused increasingly on realism. Henrik Pontoppidan (1857–1943) became a Nobel prize winner in 1917 for "his authentic descriptions of present-day life in Denmark." Pontoppidan's novels and short stories present an unusually comprehensive picture of his country and his epoch. As a writer he was an interesting figure, distancing himself both from the conservative environment in which he was brought up and from his socialist contemporaries and friends. He was the youngest and in many ways the most original and influential member of the Modern Breakthrough. Karl Gjellerup (1857–1919) shared the Nobel Prize with Pontoppidan despite considerable controversy as a result of his German affiliations.

Jens Peter Jacobsen (1847–1885) began the naturalist movement in Denmark with his romantic, melancholic poems. He is remembered principally for his two novels: Fru Marie Grubbe (1876) and Niels Lyhne (1880).

Other authors associated with the Modern Breakthrough movement include Holger Drachmann (1846–1908), a popular poet in his day, Herman Bang (1857–1912), a successful novelist, and Sophus Schandorph who gained fame with his Fra Provinsen (1876), a set of rustic tales.

== 20th century ==
=== Pre-war trends ===
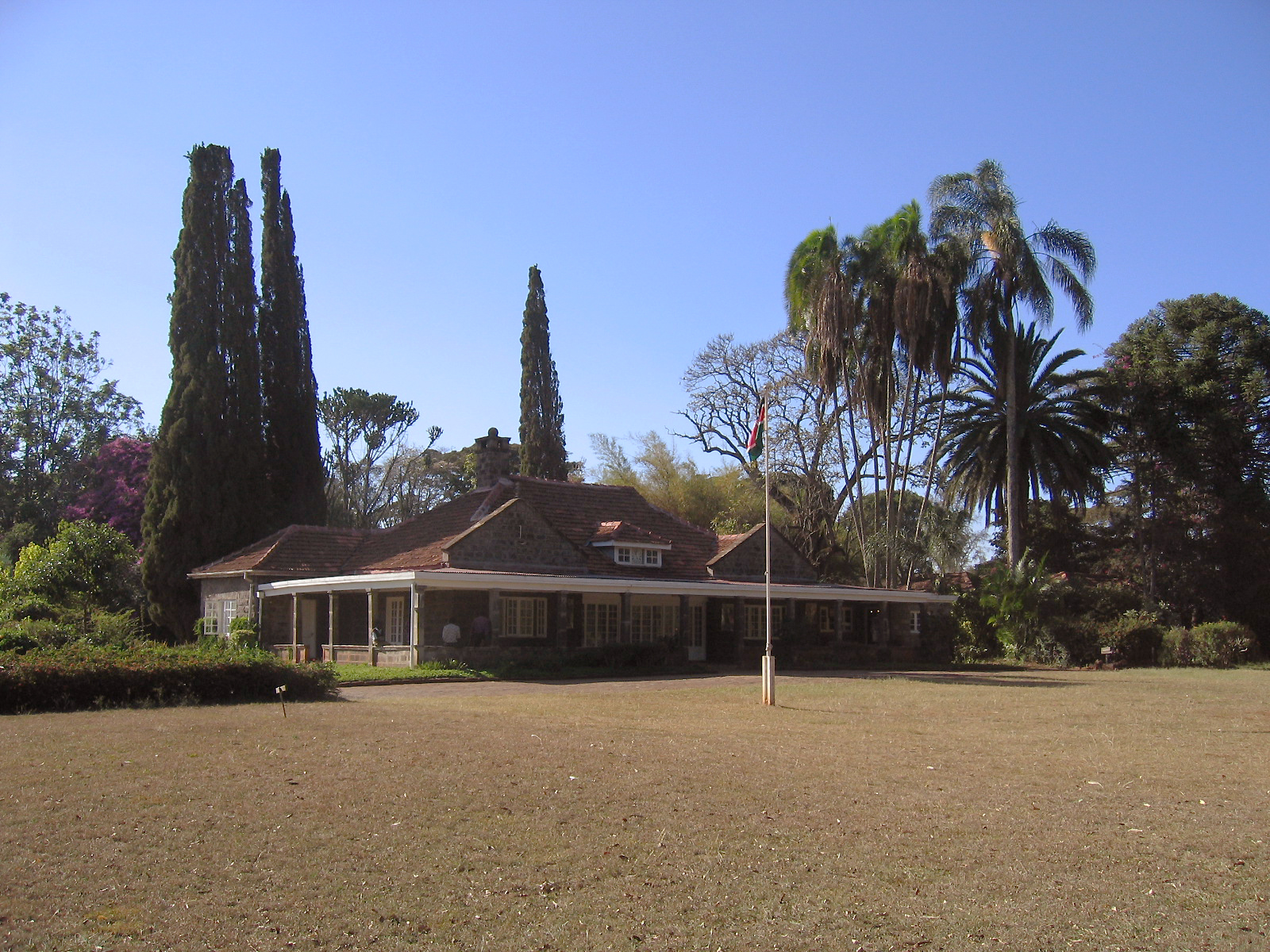
Karen Blixen's house near Nairobi, now a museum

The 20th century began with reactions against the naturalist movement, moving instead towards nationalism. A national conservative trend was embodied in the works priest, novelist and playwright Kaj Munk, and in the neo-romanticist national poetry of Valdemar Rørdam.

A more influential trajectory took its cue from the modern realism of Bang and J.P. Jacobsen, and developed an influential brand of social realism. Prime exponents for this trend was Hans Kirk and Martin Andersen Nexø who's "Pelle the Conqueror" (Pelle Erobreren) (1906–1910) breaks new ground in presenting the working class, especially the working woman. Popular writers like Poul Henningsen (known as PH), and Hans Scherfig followed Brandes' track of a radical cultural critique.

The period also saw the introduction of a regional approach to literature by writers such as Jeppe Aakjær (1866–1930) from Jutland and his wife Marie Bregendahl. Focusing more on personal concerns, Johannes Jørgensen (1866–1956) and Nobel prize-winner Johannes V. Jensen (1873–1950) brought a new dimension to their poetry, moving from lyricism to the meaning of existence.

Karen Blixen (1885–1962), who also used the pen name "Isak Dinesen", was an unusually sensitive author, writing in both English and Danish and often adopting a fairy-tale style. Her first successful work, the enigmatic "Seven Gothic Tales", was published in the United States in 1934. Other important works include her memoir Out of Africa (1937), recording her experiences in Kenya, and two more collections of finely crafted short stories, "Winter's Tales" (1942) and "Last Tales" (1957).

=== Post-war period ===
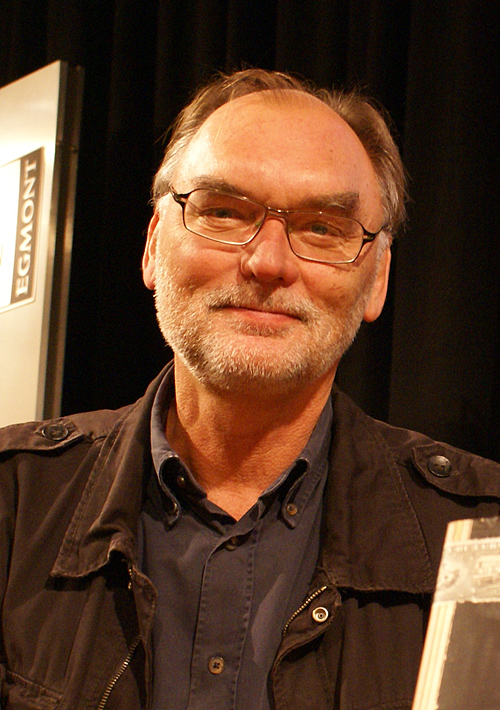
Leif Davidsen

Tove Ditlevsen (1917–1976) was an important poet, as well as a novelist, essayist and short-story writer. She became one of the most widely read women writers in Denmark. Known for her direct style and honest accounts of her private life in the poorer quarters of Copenhagen, Ditlevsen enjoyed popularity from the 1940s until her tragic suicide in 1976. Among her most popular works are her autobiographical novel Barndommens Gade translated as "Childhood's Street" (1943) and her harshly honest memoirs Det tidlige forår translated as "Early Spring" (1976).

Klaus Rifbjerg (1931–2015) has published over 100 novels as well as poetry, short stories and TV plays. Among his works which have been translated into English are Witness to the Future and War. In his novel "Den kroniske uskyld" (Chronic Innocence) (1958) about a generation which experienced problems with its personal development and its sexuality, Rifbjerg created an image of himself as a provocative and scandalous author. The novel, now a classic, is the first clear sign in Rifbjerg's work of the theme of puberty which has reappeared in much of his later fiction.

Dan Turèll (1946–1993) was an extremely prolific writer who is perhaps remembered above all for his 12 detective stories, the first of which Mord i mørket (Murder in the Dark) was published in 1981, the last Mord i San Francisco (Murder in San Francisco) in 1990. But he also wrote a passionate autobiographical novel, Vangede billeder (Images of Vangede) (1975), as well as many collections of modern poetry.

Leif Davidsen (born 1950) worked mainly in Spain and Russia as a freelance journalist for Danmarks Radio and a number of Danish newspapers. He is now better known as the author of gripping thrillers, several of which combine politics with espionage in Eastern Europe. His first book, published in 1984, was followed by eight others, all of them immediately popular in Denmark and later elsewhere in translation. English translations include "Russian Singer" (Den russiske sangerinde 1988), "The Serbian Dane" (Den serbiske dansker 1996) and "Lime's Photograph" (Lime's billede 1998), all of which have been filmed. Published in Danish in 2008, his most recent book På udkig efter Hemingway (roughly translated "Looking for Hemingway"), is a story of espionage based in Cuba.

Bjarne Reuter (born 1950) is an extremely productive and popular writer, especially in regard to children's literature. Many of his stories have appeared as films, including "Zappa" (1977) and "Busters Verden" (Buster's World) (1979). Most of his books are set in the 1950s and 1960s in Copenhagen. English translations include "The Boys from St. Petri" (Drengene fra Sankt Petri) (1991) and "The Ring of the Slave Prince" (Prins Faisals ring) (2000).

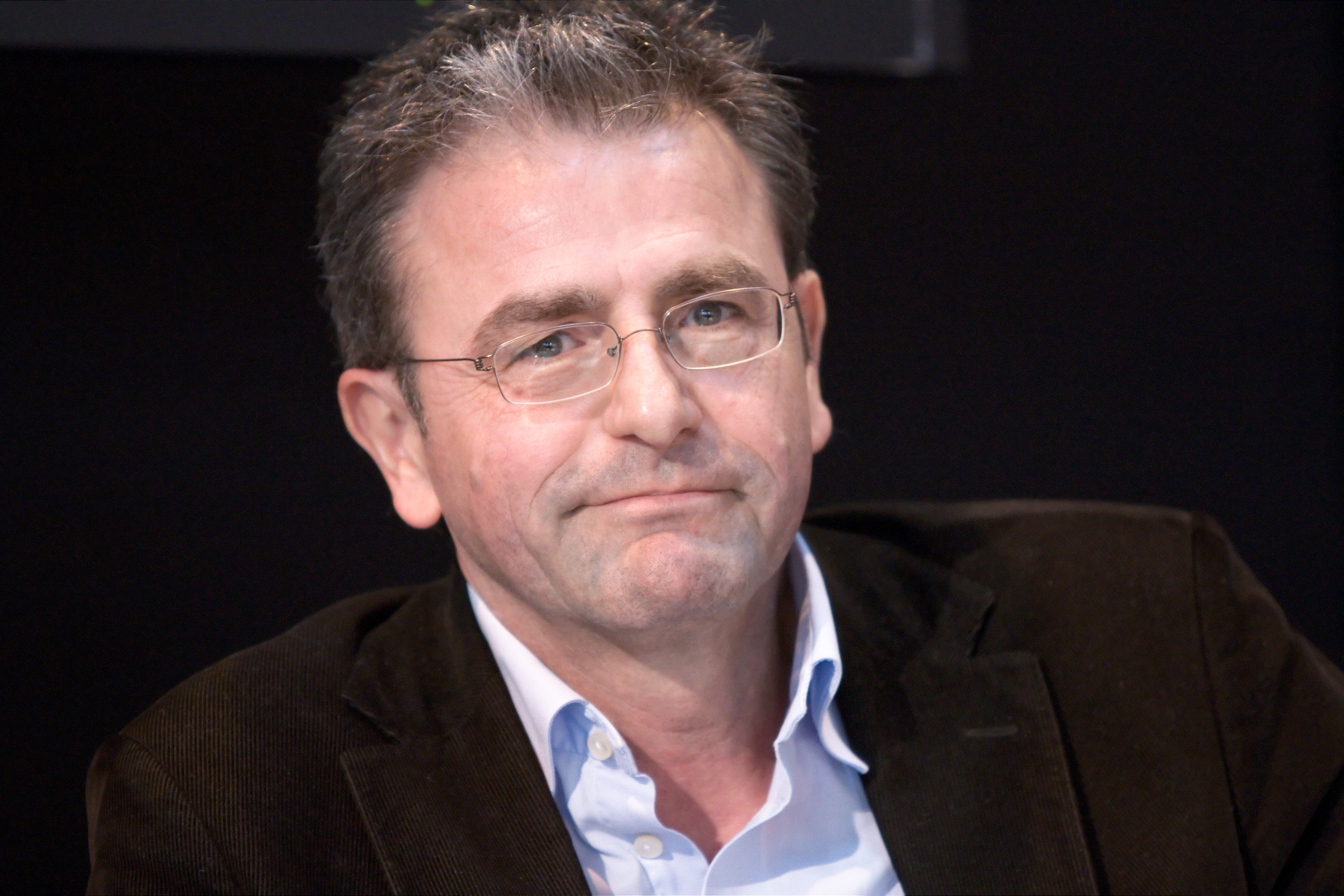
Jens Christian Grøndahl

Peter Høeg (born 1957) began his literary career in 1988 with his novel Forestilling om det tyvende århundrede (English: The History of Danish Dreams) whose colourful characters participate in Denmark's transition to a modern welfare state. It was, however, Frøken Smillas fornemmelse for sne (English: Smilla's Sense of Snow) in 1992 which became his real breakthrough. Released as a movie in 1997, it tells the story of how Smilla, a Greenlander, helps to solve the mystery behind a boy who falls to his death from a rooftop into the snow below. Almost as popular are his novels De måske egnede or Borderliners (1994), Kvinden og aben or The Woman and the Ape (1996) and Den stille pige or The Quiet Girl (2007).

Jens Christian Grøndahl (born 1959) began his literary career in 1985 with novels in the rather complex French nouveau roman style. His breakthrough came in 1998 with his more traditionally structured Lucca which had far more general appeal. Grøndahl's psychological insight into amorous relationships between individuals of different ages has made him one of Denmark's most appreciated modern novelists. Several of his books have been translated into English including Tavshed i oktober (Silence in October) (1996), Virginia (2000) and Et andet lys (An Altered Light) (2002).

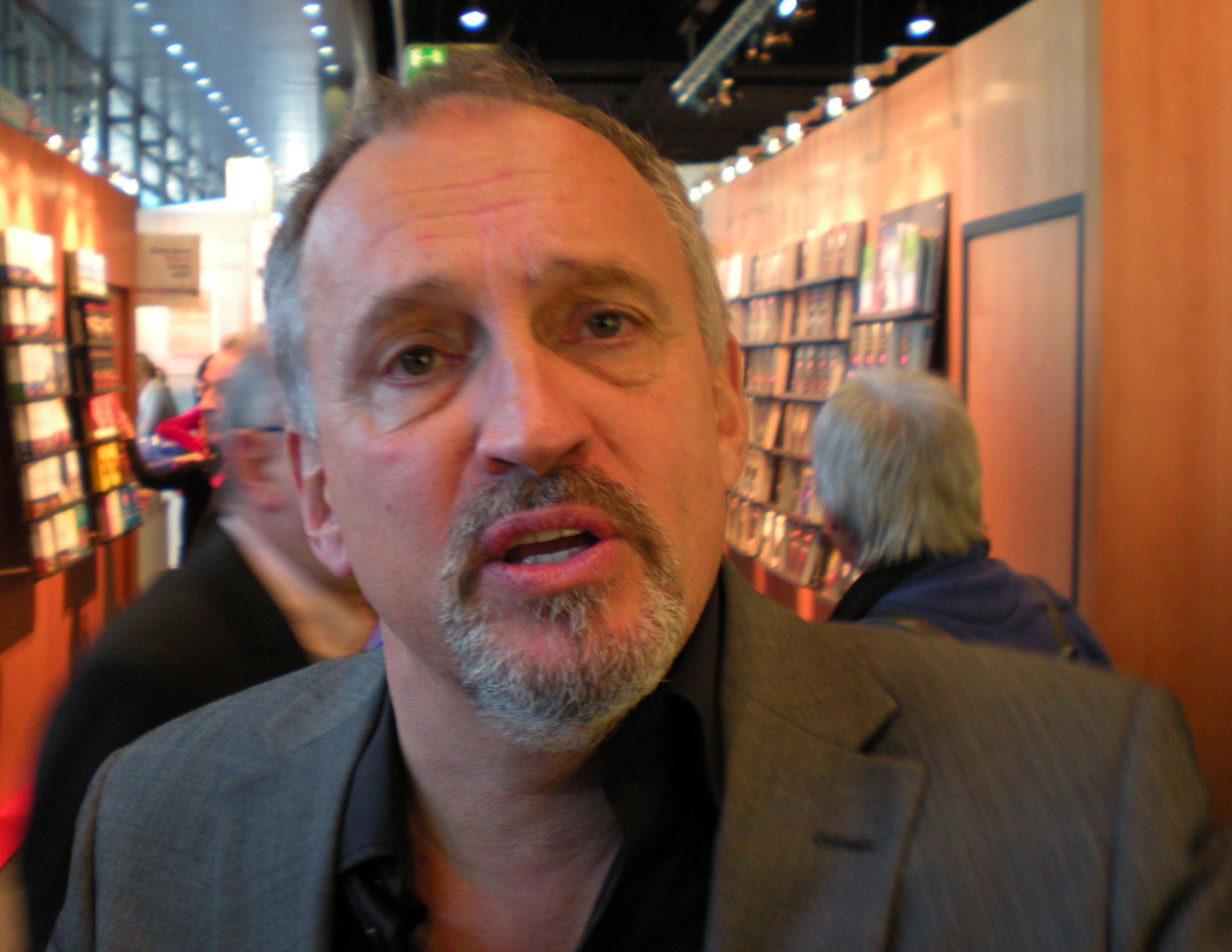
Jussi Adler-Olsen

Among other popular contemporary authors are:

- Benny Andersen (1929–2018), Denmark's favourite lyricist, whose collected poems (Samlede digte) (1998) have sold over 100,000 copies.
- Jane Aamund (1936–2019) whose popularity stems above all from her erotically presented autobiographical works which became best sellers in the 1990s.
- Anders Bodelsen (1937–2021) whose works include thrillers about middle-class people faced with materialistic trends.
- Elsebeth Egholm (born 1960), a best-selling author of crime fiction in the new millennium with two television series based on her novels, gaining international success with Those Who Kill.
- Christian Kampmann (1939–1988) whose novels depict the upper middle classes in post-war Denmark.
- Svend Aage Madsen (born 1939) whose novels combining realism with fantasy include Vice and Virtue in Middle Time (Tugt og utugt i mellemtiden, 1976).
- Dea Trier Mørch (1941–2001) who gained international fame in 1976 with her novel "Vinterbørn" (Winter's Child) about the worries and difficulties women face in connection with childbirth.
- Jakob Ejersbo (1968–2008) whose bestselling Tanzania-based trilogy consisting of two novels, "Eksil" (Exile) and "Liberty", and a set of short stories, "Revolution", emphasizes the basic conditions and longings of human existence.
- Jussi Adler-Olsen (born 1950) became a bestselling author in 1997 with his first novel Alfabethuset, followed by several more equally successful thrillers including Flaskepost fra P (Message in a Bottle) in 2009.
- Birgithe Kosovic (born 1972) has become an award-winning novelist with her Det dobbelte land (literally The Doubled Country, 2010) based on her family's drama in the former Yugoslavia.
- Villy Sorensen (born 1929) has been compared to Kafka, and has written short stories and philosophical works and essays, including a response to Kierkegaard's, Hverken-eller (i.e. "Neither/Nor"), and has received several awards. He is also credited with the beginning of Modernism in Denmark.

== Current trends ==
=== Sales ===
In 2002, a total of 30 million books—or six for every person—were sold in Denmark, with one in five being in English. Statistics for 2009 show that the book market, like other sectors, suffered a reduction of 9.1% in sales. These figures cover both the private and public sectors, including a surprising drop in book sales to schools.

== See also ==
- List of Danish writers
- List of Danish women writers
- Danish Culture Canon
- List of libraries in Denmark
