= De Gyldne Laurbær =

Danish literature award

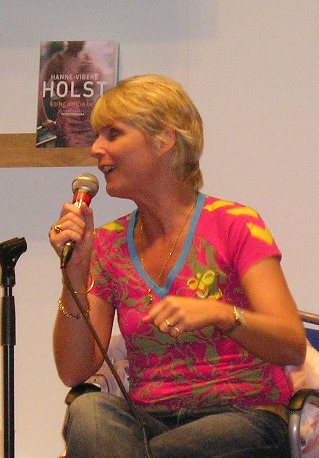
Hanne-Vibeke Holst award winner 2008

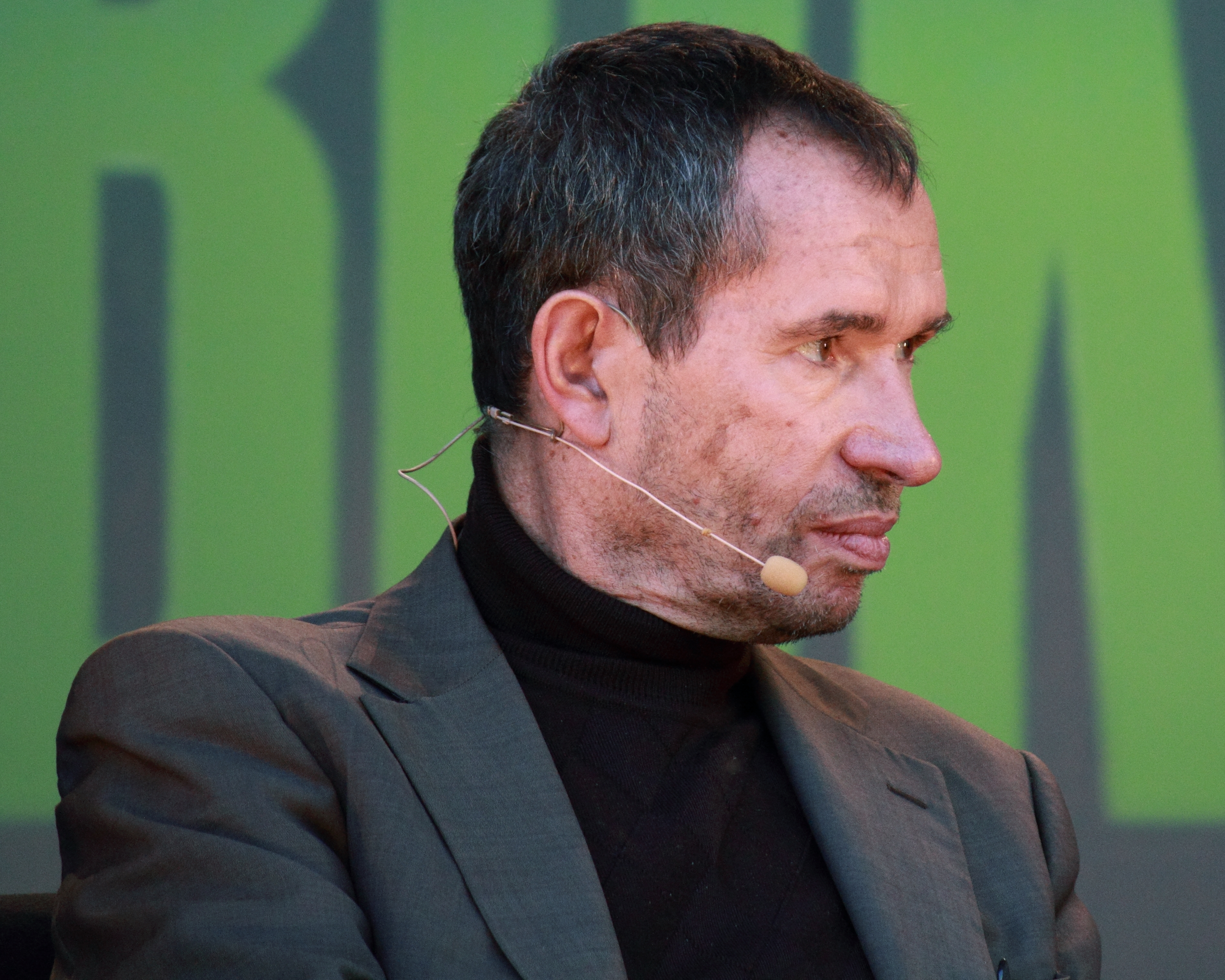
Carsten Jensen, award winner 1996

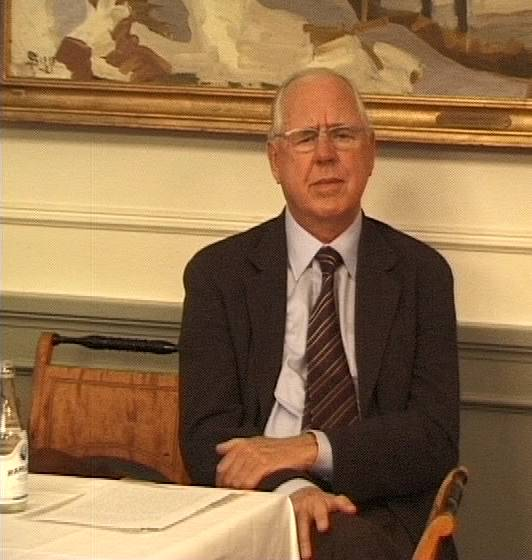
Klaus Rifbjerg, award winner 1966

De Gyldne Laurbær (English: The Golden Laurel) (earlier: Boghandlernes Gyldne Laurbær) is a Danish literature award, which was established in 1949. The award is handed by The Committee De Gyldne Laurbær, formerly Boghandlerklubben (The Bookshops' Club). The prize is given annually in February or March. Originally the award was a laurel wreath, a golden pin with an inscription, some money and a book gift worth 2500 DKK. Today the award is a laurel wreathe, a diploma and a book gift worth 2500 DKK. The award is handed at a ceremony arranged by the publishing house which has published the winning book and by the Committee De Gyldne Laurbær. Early in January every year the committee sends out ballot to all the Danish bookshops, which then give their vote for a Danish book which was published the year before. An author can only win The Golden Laurel once-in-a-lifetime, so the bookshops can not vote for an author who has already won the prize once before. The winner is usually one of the bestsellers among the Danish books. On the day when it is decided who wins the Golden Laurel, the president of the Committee of The Golden Laurel informs the winner about the award, while journalists follow the event.

== Recipients ==
- 1949 – Martin A. Hansen for Tanker i en skorsten
- 1950 – Hans Christian Branner for Rytteren
- 1951 – Jacob Paludan for Retur til barndommen
- 1952 – Karen Blixen for Babettes gæstebud
- 1953 – Aage Dons for Altid at spørge
- 1954 – Tom Kristensen
- 1955 – Tove Ditlevsen
- 1956 – Karl Bjarnhof
- 1957 – Halfdan Rasmussen
- 1958 – Frank Jæger
- 1959 – Willy-August Linnemann
- 1960 – Palle Lauring
- 1961 – Marcus Lauesen
- 1962 – Poul Ørum
- 1963 – Jakob Bech Nygaard
- 1964 – Erik Aalbæk Jensen
- 1965 – Thorkild Hansen
- 1966 – Klaus Rifbjerg for Operaelskeren
- 1967 – Jens Kruuse
- 1968 – Anders Bodelsen
- 1969 – Inger Christensen for Det
- 1970 – Leif Panduro
- 1971 – Henrik Stangerup for Løgn over løgn
- 1972 – Christian Kampmann
- 1973 – Anna Ladegaard
- 1974 – Benny Andersen
- 1975 – Bo Bramsen
- 1976 – Dea Trier Mørch
- 1977 – Ebbe Kløvedal Reich
- 1978 – Vita Andersen for Hold kæft og vær smuk
- 1979 – Johannes Møllehave for Læsehest med æselører
- 1980 – Tage Skou-Hansen
- 1981 – Suzanne Brøgger for Tone
- 1982 – Kirsten Thorup
- 1983 – Dorrit Willumsen
- 1984 – Cecil Bødker for Marias Barn. Drengen and Marias Barn. Manden
- 1985 – Helle Stangerup for Christine
- 1986 – Paul Hammerich for Lysmageren
- 1987 – Martha Christensen for Dansen med Regitze
- 1988 – Bjarne Reuter for Den cubanske kabale
- 1989 – Ib Michael for Kilroy, Kilroy
- 1990 – Peter Seeberg for Om fjorten dage
- 1991 – Leif Davidsen for Den sidste spion
- 1992 – Lise Nørgaard for Kun en pige
- 1993 – Peter Høeg for De måske egnede
- 1994 – Jørn Riel for Cirkulæret og andre skrøner
- 1995 – Henrik Nordbrandt for Ormene ved himlens port
- 1996 – Carsten Jensen for Jeg har set verden begynde
- 1997 – Jane Aamund for Colorado drømme
- 1998 – Jens Christian Grøndahl for Lucca
- 1999 – Svend Åge Madsen for Genspejlet
- 2000 – Anne Marie Løn for Kærlighedens rum
- 2001 – Hans Edvard Nørregård-Nielsen for Riber Ret
- 2002 – Jakob Ejersbo for Nordkraft
- 2003 – Jette A. Kaarsbøl for Den lukkede bog
- 2004 – Christian Jungersen for Undtagelsen
- 2005 – Morten Ramsland for Hundehoved
- 2006 – Knud Romer for Den som blinker er bange for døden
- 2007 – Jens Smærup Sørensen for Mærkedage
- 2008 – Hanne-Vibeke Holst for Dronningeofret
- 2009 – Ida Jessen for the novel Børnene
- 2010 – Jussi Adler-Olsen for the novel Journal 64
- 2011 – Helle Helle for the novel Dette burde skrives i nutid
- 2012 – Kim Leine for the novel Profeterne i Evighedsfjorden
- 2013 – Anne-Cathrine Riebnitzsky for the novel Forbandede yngel
- 2014 – Sara Blædel for the novel Kvinden de meldte savnet
- 2015 – Jesper Stein for the novel Aisha
- 2016 – Merete Pryds Helle for the novel Folkets skønhed
- 2017 – Jesper Wung-Sung for the novel En anden gren
- 2018 – Leonora Christina Skov for the novel Den, der lever stille
- 2019 – Sara Omar for the novel Skyggedanseren
- 2020 – Stine Pilgaard for the novel Meter i sekundet
- 2021 – Thomas Korsgaard for the novel Man skulle nok have været der
- 2022 – Maren Uthaug for the novel 11%
- 2023 – Kim Blæsbjerg for the novel De bedste familier
