= Uthaug (disambiguation) =

Uthaug is a village in Ørland Municipality in Trøndelag county, Norway.

Uthaug may also refer to:

- HNoMS Uthaug, submarines of the Royal Norwegian Navy

== People with the surname ==
- Jørleif Uthaug (1911–1990), Norwegian illustrator, painter and sculptor
- Maren Uthaug (born 1972), Norwegian, Sami and Danish comics creator and writer
- Roar Uthaug (born 1973), Norwegian film director
