= 1000Fryd =

Bar and arts centre in Aalborg, Denmark

Coordinates: 57.0472°N 9.9201°E

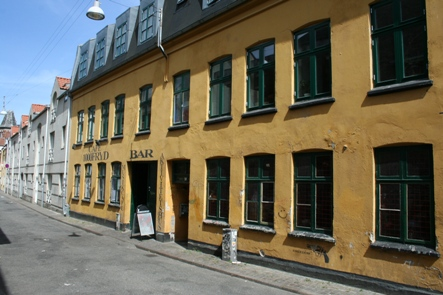
1000FRYD is a community center driven and owned by the 1000FRYD community.

1000Fryd is a small café, bar, and community center with a stage, a recording studio, a cinema, and an art gallery, located in Aalborg, Denmark. Since 1000Fryd opened in 1984 there have been thousands of concerts by both well known bands – such as Die Toten Hosen and Green Day – and utterly obscure local performers, such as Jimmy Justice and Columbian Neckties. It is a focus of the successful novel Nordkraft by Jakob Ejersbo.

The bar and concert hall are located on the ground floor. Other floors in the building contain cots for touring bands, artists and vagrants as well as several art studios. The venue is operated by foreningen Tusindfryd and staffed by volunteers. It has promoted non-traditional music, for example "Denmark's first grunge band" and alternative rock.

The bar has been plagued by vandalism and fighting, including a riot in front of it in 2007, and at one point almost lost its liquor licence.

1000Fryd plays a major role in Jakob Ejersbo's successful novel Nordkraft, which explores the culture of disaffected urban youth at the turn of the 1980s–1990s and was adapted as a film in 2005 (English title: Angels in Fast Motion) and as a play in 2011. According to one of those who worked on the stage adaptation: "In Aalborg it's the culture surrounding 1000Fryd in the transition from the 80s to the 90s. It's an underground culture of middle-class and lower-middle-class kids that developed in a strong form during the 80s. Not working-class as such, but rather a sort of youth proletariat that made itself felt very strongly in Aalborg and Aarhus in those years".
