= S304 =

S304 may refer to:

- HNoMS Uthaug (S304), a Norwegian Ula class sub-marine
- DiMAGE S304, a Minolta camera
- S304 (6'13"), a No Warning song on Suffer, Survive album
