= Freezing Point (Bodelsen novel) =

1969 novel by Anders Bodelsen

- Author: Anders Bodelsen
- Original title: Frysepunktet
- Translator: Joan Tate
- Language: Danish
- Publisher: Gyldendal
- Publication date: 1969
- Publication place: Denmark
- English publication date: 1971
- Pages: 167

Freezing Point (Danish: Frysepunktet), published as Freezing Down in the United States, is a 1969 novel by the Danish writer Anders Bodelsen.

== Plot ==
In 1973, Bruno is a 32-year-old editor at a weekly magazine. His job involves coming up with story ideas for fiction writers the magazine publishes, but his own literary ambitions have failed and he thinks he has little to live for. He becomes infatuated with a gloomy ballet dancer. When he finds out he is seriously ill with cancer, he accepts an offer to cryopreserve his body until he can be cured.

He wakes up in a dystopian 1995 where magazines do not exist anymore and there is little interest in literature. Instead, life extension and organ trade are major parts of culture. Society has become divided between those who opt for "all-life", which means near-immortality, and those who choose "now-life", where they can live an affluent life as mortals by mortgaging their vital organs. The stability of this society is under constant threat from imbalance of supply and demand. Its regime has become repressive, engaging in mass surveillance and control of language.

== Reception ==
In 1971, The New York Times wrote that Bodelsen "speculates on the metaphysics of geriatry with wit and imagination".

Upon republication in 2025, Nina Allan of The Guardian called Freezing Point an "uncannily prescient" and "subtly experimental" novel about subjects such as fiction writing, capitalism, the attitude to ageing, and the difference between life and eternity. She wrote that its "strain of dark humour" makes it "enjoyably entertaining in spite of the grim reality being portrayed".
