= Anders Bodelsen =

Danish writer (1937–2021)

Anders Bodelsen (11 February 1937 – 17 October 2021) was a Danish writer primarily associated with the 1960 new-realism wave in Danish literature, along with Christian Kampmann and Henrik Stangerup. Bodelsen preferred the social-realistic style of writing, often thrillers about middle-class people who face the consequences of materialism, which often clashes with their human values. His thrillers also experiment with ordinary persons tempted by e.g. theft and border-morale issues.

Most known is Bodelsen's novel Think of a Number (Tænk på et tal, 1968) filmed as The Silent Partner in 1978. Also widely known is his cooperation with Danish National Television (Danmarks Radio) on the filming of some of his children's thrillers, e.g. Guldregn ("Golden Rain", 1986). Furthermore, he also made some lesser known radio plays. He had a very brief cameo in the second of the Olsen-banden series of films, Olsen-banden på spanden.

In his 1969 novel Freezing Point (Frysepunktet), a young magazine editor named Bruno is cryogenically frozen after being diagnosed with terminal cancer, being revived two decades later in a future society that turns dystopian. The novel was translated into English by Joan Tate in 1971. The translation was republished in 2025. British speculative fiction writer Nina Allan described the novel in 2025 as "uncannily prescient."

Bodelsen died on 17 October 2021. He was 84 years old.

== Bibliography ==
=== Novels ===
- 1959 - De lyse nætters tid
- 1964 - Villa Sunset
- 1965 - " drivhuset"
- 1968 - Hændeligt uheld; English translation: Hit and Run, Run, Run (1970); Grand Prix de Littérature Policière
- 1968 - Tænk på et tal; English translation: Think of a Number (1969)
- 1969 - Frysepunktet; English translation: Freezing Point (1971)
- 1970 - Ferie
- 1971 - Straus; English translation: Straus (1974)
- 1971 - Hjælp
- 1972 - Pigerne på broen
- 1973 - Bevisets stilling; English translation: Consider the Verdict (1976)
- 1974 - Alt hvad du ønsker dig
- 1975 - Blæsten i Alleen
- 1975 - Operation Cobra; English translation: Operation Cobra (1979)
- 1976 - Pengene og livet
- 1977 - De gode tider
- 1978 - År for år
- 1980 - Borte, borte
- 1982 - Over regnbuen
- 1984 - Domino
- 1985 - Revision
- 1986 - Guldregn
- 1988 - Mørklægning; Martin Beck Award
- 1989 - Byen uden ildebrande
- 1991 - Rød september
- 1993 - Farligt bryg
- 1997 - Den åbne dør
- 2009 - Varm luft
