= Aspergillus christenseniae =

Scientific classification
- Kingdom: Fungi
- Division: Ascomycota
- Class: Eurotiomycetes
- Order: Eurotiales
- Family: Aspergillaceae
- Genus: Aspergillus
- Species: A. christenseniae

Binomial name
- Aspergillus christenseniae A.J. Chen, Frisvad & Samson (2016)

Species of fungus

Aspergillus christenseniae is a species of fungus in the genus Aspergillus. It is from the Cervini section. The species was first described in 2016. It has been reported to produce 4-hydroxymellein, terremutin, orange-red anthraquinone, and chlorflavonin. The species was named for Martha Christensen.

== Growth and morphology ==
A. christenseniae has been cultivated on both Czapek yeast extract agar (CYA) plates and Malt Extract Agar Oxoid® (MEAOX) plates. The growth morphology of the colonies can be seen in the pictures below.

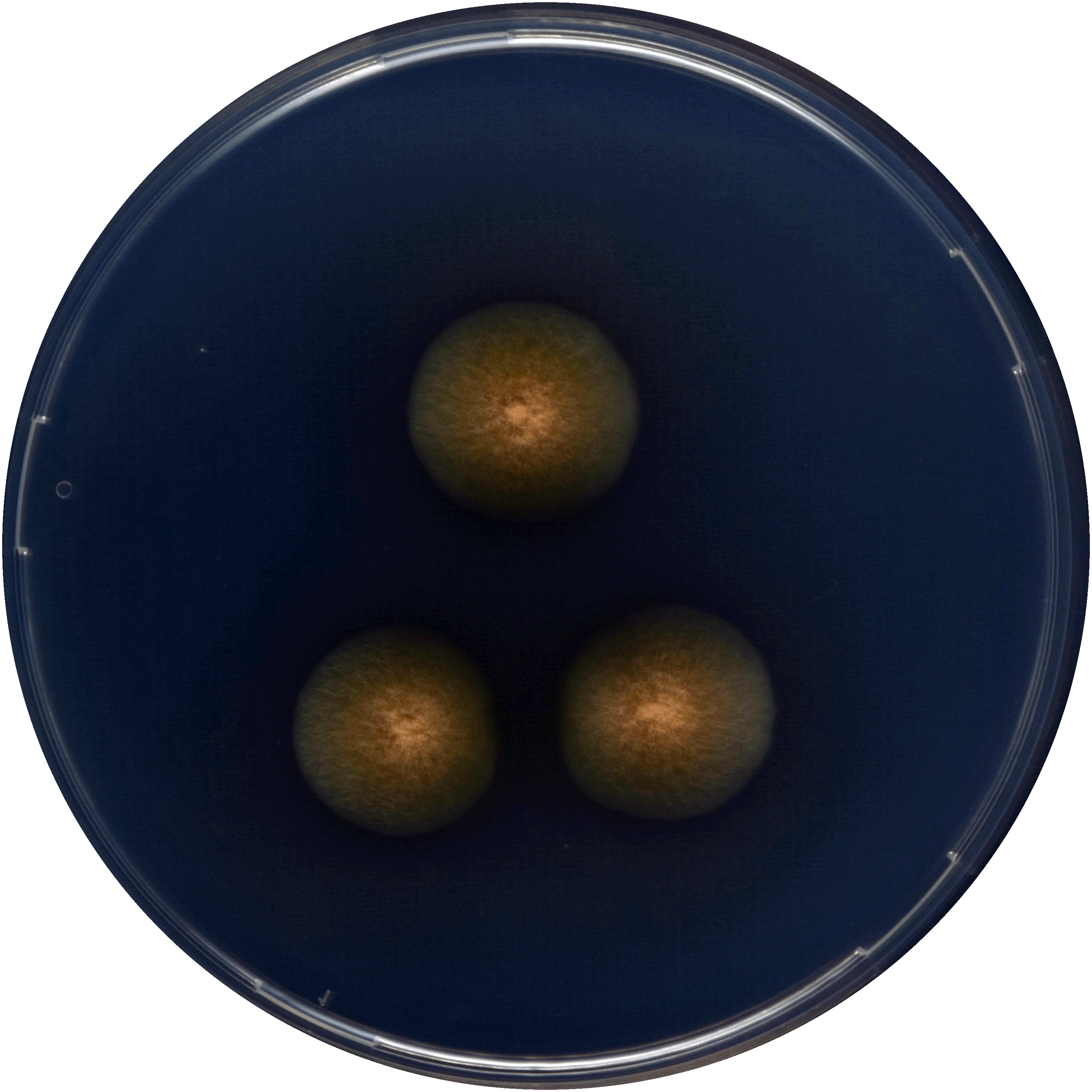
Aspergillus christenseniae growing on CYA plate

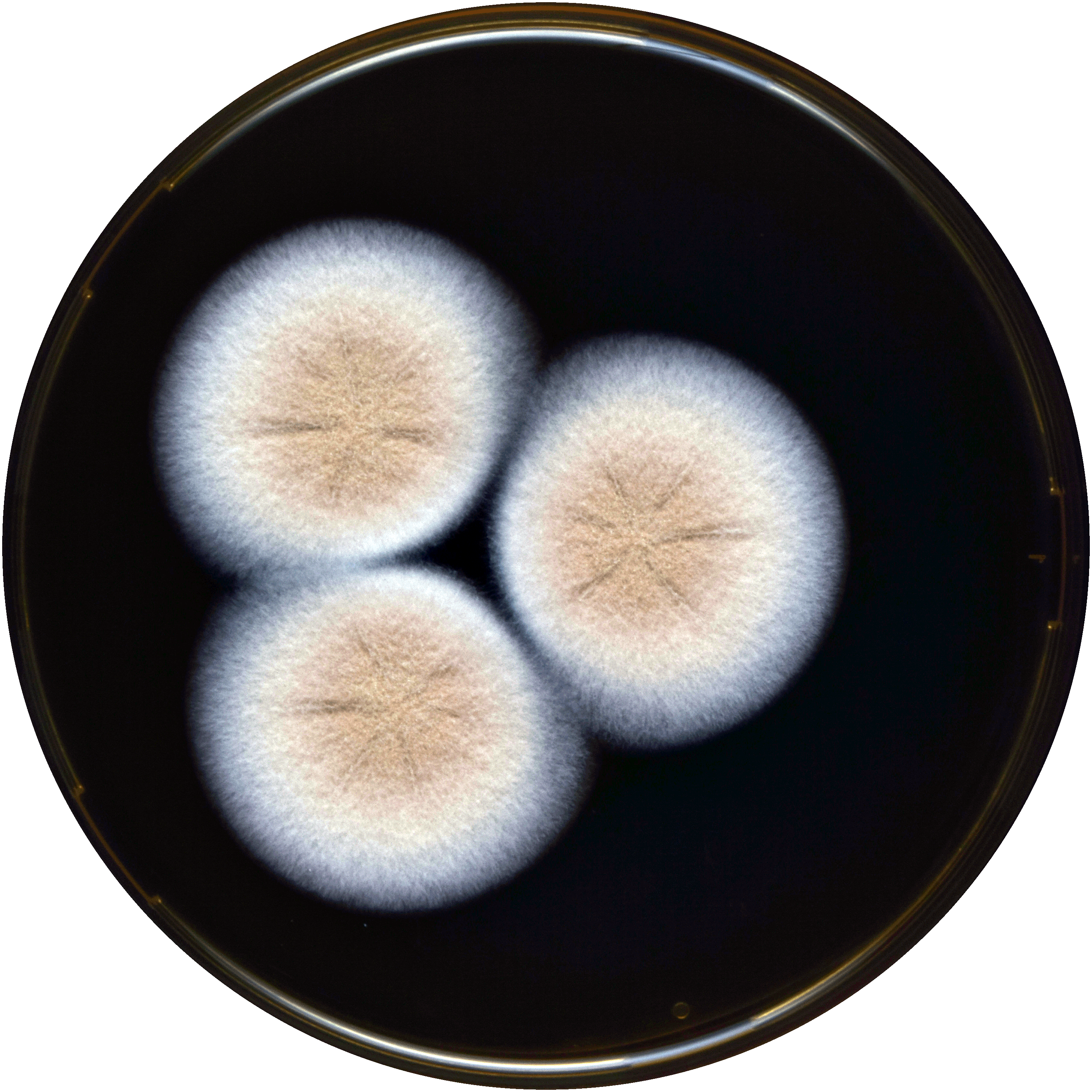
Aspergillus christenseniae growing on MEAOX plate
