= Penicillium christenseniae =

Scientific classification
- Kingdom: Fungi
- Division: Ascomycota
- Class: Eurotiomycetes
- Order: Eurotiales
- Family: Aspergillaceae
- Genus: Penicillium
- Species: P. christenseniae

Binomial name
- Penicillium christenseniae Houbraken, Frisvad & Samson 2011

Type strain
- CBS 126236, CBS 126237

Species of fungus

Penicillium christenseniae is a fungus species of the genus of Penicillium which was isolated from native forest near Costa Rica. Penicillium christenseniae is named after Martha Christensen.

== See also ==
- List of Penicillium species
