= Georg Brandes =

Danish literature critic and scholar (1842–1927)

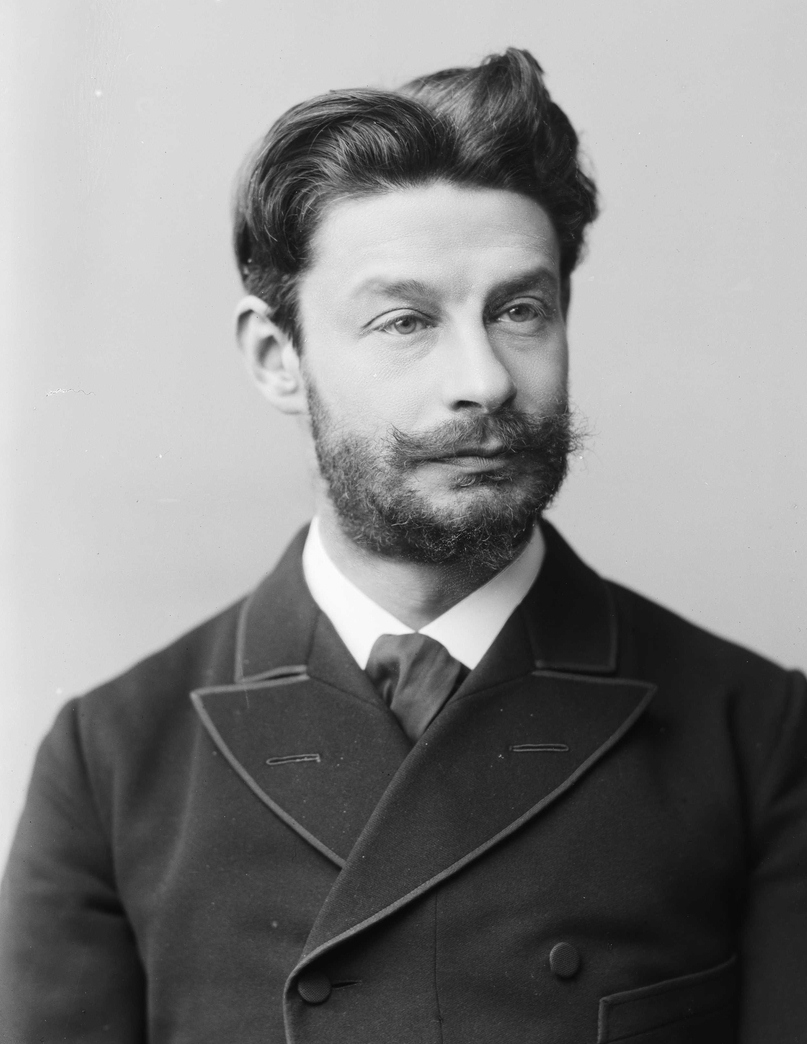
- Brandes c. 1886
- Born: Georg Morris Cohen Brandes; 4 February 1842; Copenhagen, Denmark
- Died: 19 February 1927 (aged 85); Copenhagen, Denmark
- Education: University of Copenhagen
- Occupation: Critic
- Relatives: Edvard Brandes (brother)

Signature
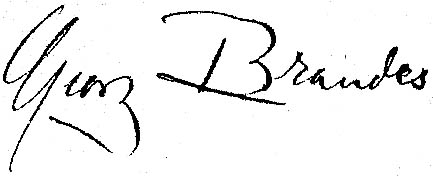

Georg Morris Cohen Brandes (4 February 1842 – 19 February 1927) was a Danish critic and scholar who greatly influenced Scandinavian and European literature from the 1870s through the turn of the 20th century. He is seen as the theorist behind the "Modern Breakthrough" of Scandinavian culture. At the age of 30, Brandes formulated the principles of a new realism and naturalism, condemning hyper-aesthetic writing and also fantasy in literature. His literary goals were shared by some other authors, among them the Norwegian "realist" playwright Henrik Ibsen.

When Georg Brandes held a series of lectures in 1871 with the title "Main Currents in 19th-century Literature", he defined the Modern Breakthrough and started the movement that would become Cultural Radicalism. In 1884 Viggo Hørup, Georg Brandes, and his brother Edvard Brandes started the daily newspaper Politiken with the motto: "The paper of greater enlightenment". The paper and their political debates led to a split of the liberal party Venstre in 1905 and created the new party Det Radikale Venstre.

== Biography ==
Georg Brandes was born into a non-observant Jewish middle-class family in Copenhagen, the elder brother of prominent Danes Ernst Brandes and Edvard Brandes. He became a student at the University of Copenhagen in 1859 where he first studied jurisprudence. From this, however, his interests soon turned to philosophy and aesthetics. In 1862 he won the gold medal of the university for an essay on The Idea of Nemesis among the Ancients. Before this, indeed since 1858, he had shown a remarkable gift for verse-writing, the results of which, however, were not abundant enough to justify separate publication. Brandes did not collect his poems until as late as 1898. At the university, which he left in 1864, Brandes was influenced by the writings of Heiberg in criticism and Søren Kierkegaard in philosophy, influences which continued to leave traces on his work.

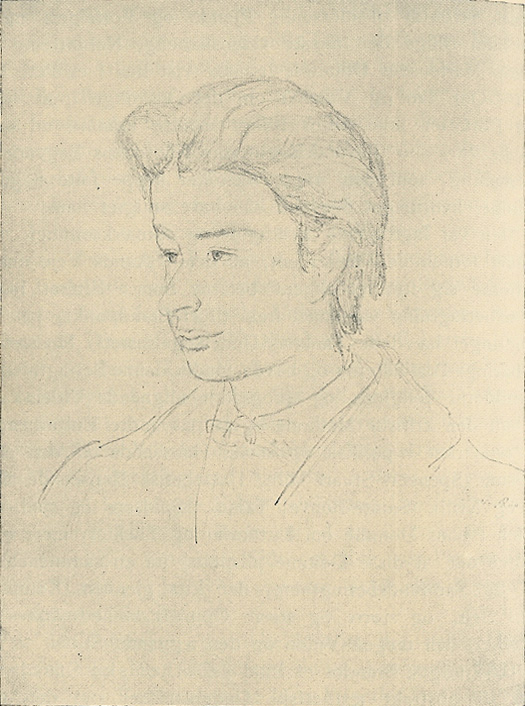
Georg Brandes in his youth. 1868 drawing by Godtfred Rump.

In 1866, he contributed to the discussion of the works of Rasmus Nielsen in "Dualism in our Recent Philosophy". From 1865 to 1871 he traveled much in Europe, acquainting himself with the condition of literature in the principal centers of learning. His first important contribution to letters was his Aesthetic Studies (1868), where his maturer method is already foreshadowed in several brief monographs on Danish poets. In 1870 he published several important volumes, The French Aesthetics of the Present Day, dealing chiefly with Hippolyte Taine, Criticisms and Portraits, and a translation of The Subjection of Women by John Stuart Mill, whom he had met that year during a visit to England.

=== The Modern Breakthrough ===
Brandes now took his place as the leading northern European critic, applying to local conditions and habits of thought the methods of Taine. He became Docent or reader in Aesthetics at the University of Copenhagen, where his lectures were a great success and gathered huge audiences. His famous opening lecture on 3 November 1871, Hovedstrømninger i det 19de Aarhundredes Litteratur (English: Main Currents in the Literature of the Nineteenth Century), signalled the beginning of his lifelong struggle to modernize Danish literature. After the professorship of aesthetics became vacant in 1872, it was taken as a matter of course that Brandes would fill it. But the young critic had offended many sensibilities by his ardent advocacy of modern ideas; he was seen as a Jew (which he did not consider himself to be), his convictions were Radical, he was suspected of being an atheist. The authorities refused to appoint him, but his fitness for the post was so obvious that the chair of Aesthetics remained vacant for years, since no one else dared to place himself in comparison with Brandes.

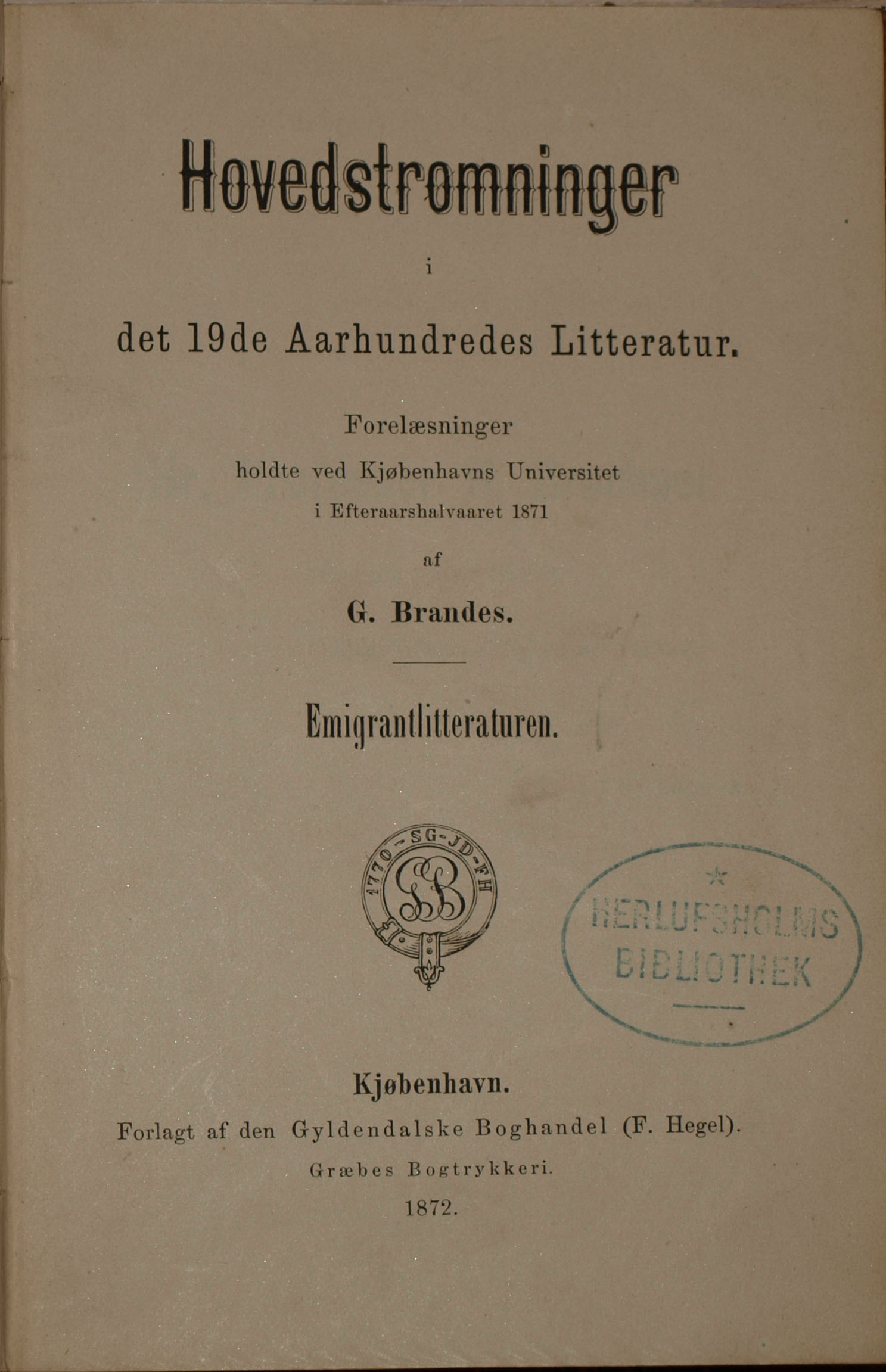
Danish first edition of Brandes' Hovedstrømninger i det 19de Aarhundredes Litteratur – Emigrantlitteraturen from 1872.

In the middle of these polemics, Brandes began to issue volumes of the most ambitious of his works, Main Currents in the Literature of the Nineteenth Century, of which four volumes appeared between 1872 and 1875 (English translation, 1901–1905). The brilliant novelty of this criticism of the literature of major European countries at the beginning of the 19th century, and his description of the general revolt against the pseudo-classicism of the 18th century, at once attracted attention outside Denmark. The tumult which gathered round the person of the critic increased the success of the work, and the reputation of Brandes grew apace, especially in Germany and Russia.

In 1877 Brandes left Copenhagen and settled in Berlin, taking a considerable part in the aesthetic life of that city. His political views, however, made Prussia uncomfortable with him, and he returned in 1883 to Copenhagen, where he found a whole new school of writers and thinkers eager to receive him as their leader. He headed the group "Det moderne Gjennembruds Mænd" (The Men of the Modern Breakthrough), composed of J. P. Jacobsen, Holger Drachmann, Edvard Brandes, Erik Skram, Sophus Schandorph, and Norwegians Henrik Ibsen and Bjørnstjerne Bjørnson, but a conservative reaction against his "realistic" doctrines began around 1883, headed by Holger Drachmann.

=== Later authorship ===
Among his later writings must be mentioned the monographs on Søren Kierkegaard (1877), Esaias Tegnér (1878), Benjamin Disraeli (1878), Ferdinand Lassalle (in German, 1877), Ludvig Holberg (1884), Henrik Ibsen (1899) and on Anatole France (1905). Brandes wrote with great depth on the main contemporary poets and novelists of Denmark and Norway, and he and his disciples were for a long time the arbiters of literary success in the north. His Danish Poets (1877), containing studies of Carsten Hauch, Ludvig Bødtcher, Christian Winther and Frederick Paludan-Müller, his Men of the Modern Transition (1883), and his Essays (1889), are volumes essential to the proper study of modern Scandinavian literature. He wrote an excellent book on Poland (1888; English translation, 1903), and was one of the editors of the German version of Ibsen.

The most important of his later works was his study of William Shakespeare (1897–1898), which was translated into English by William Archer and was highly acclaimed. It was, perhaps, history's most authoritative work on Shakespeare not principally intended for an English-speaking audience. He was afterwards engaged in writing a history of modern Scandinavian literature. In his critical work, which extended over a wider field than that of any other living writer, Brandes was aided by a singularly charming style, lucid and reasonable, enthusiastic but without extravagance, brilliant and colored without affectation. In 1900 he collected his works for the first time in a complete and popular edition and began to work on a German edition, completed in 1902.

He published Main Currents in Nineteenth-Century Literature in 1906 (six volumes). This book was among the 100 best books for education selected in 1929 by Will Durant. Durant and Brandes were both contributors to the Mother Earth magazine. In Volume 2 Brandes says about Kierkegaard,

"It is not merely in name that this irony bears a fundamental resemblance to Kierkegaard's, which also aristocratically 'chooses to be misunderstood'. The Ego of genius is the truth, if not in the sense in which Kierkegaard would have us understand his proposition, 'Subjectivity is the truth', still in the sense that the Ego has every externally valid commandment and prohibition in its power; and, to the astonishment and scandal of the world, invariably expresses itself in paradoxes. Irony is 'divine audacity'. In audacity thus comprehended there are endless possibilities. It is freedom from prejudice, yet it suggests the possibility of the most audacious defence of all possible kinds of prejudices. It is more easily attainable, we are told, by woman than by man. 'Like the feminine garb, the feminine intellect has this advantage over the masculine, that its possessor by a single daring movement can rise above all the prejudices of civilization and bourgeois conventionality, at once transporting herself into the state of innocence and the lap of Nature'. The lap of Nature! There is an echo of Rousseau's voice even in this wanton tirade. We seem to hear the trumpet-call of revolution; what we really hear is only the proclamation of reaction. Rousseau desired to return to the state of nature, when men roamed naked through the pathless forests and lived upon acorns. Schelling wished to turn the course of evolution back to the primeval ages, to the days before man had fallen. Schlegel blows revolutionary melodies on the great romantic 'wonder-horn'."

=== Personal life and last years ===
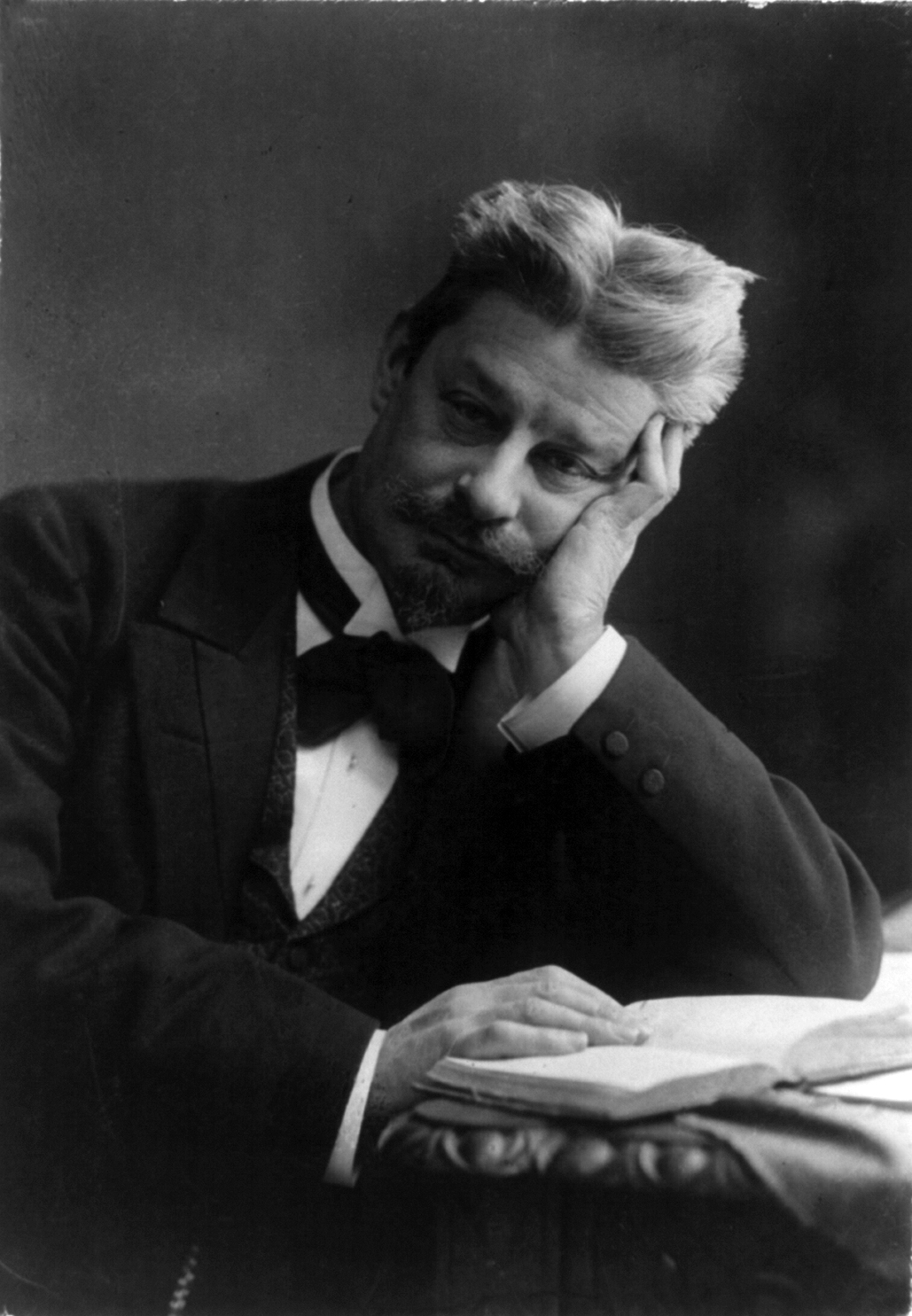
Brandes in 1904

In the late 1880s, Brandes fought against what he saw as the hypocrisy of prudish sexuality, which caused a rift with Bjørnstjerne Bjørnson. Between the years of 1886 and 1888 Brandes was engaged in a relationship with the Swedish author Victoria Benedictsson, who wrote Penningar and Fru Marianne under the male pseudonym Ernst Ahlgren. Benedictsson committed suicide in a Copenhagen hotel room, and the relationship with Brandes has later been blamed as the cause for her death.

In the late 1880s, Brandes turned to concentrating on "great personalities" as the source of culture. In this period, he discovered Friedrich Nietzsche, not only introducing him to Scandinavian culture but indirectly to the whole world. The series of lectures that he gave on Nietzsche's thought, which he described as "aristocratic radicalism", were the first to present Nietzsche as a world cultural figure in need of full intellectual notice. Of Brandes' description of his philosophy, Nietzsche himself remarked: "The expression 'aristocratic radicalism', which you employ, is very good. It is, permit me to say, the cleverest thing that I have yet read about myself". In 1909 the lectures were edited and published as the monograph Friedrich Nietzsche, which included the complete Nietzsche/Brandes correspondence as well as two essays in homage to the late Nietzsche's life and thought. Translated into English by A. G. Chater, the volume was published by Heinemann in 1914 and Nietzsche's thought was thus able to reach a significant English language audience before World War I. It was Brandes who, in an 1888 letter, wrote to Nietzsche advising him to read the works of Søren Kierkegaard, with whom his thought had much in common. There is no evidence, however, that Nietzsche ever read any of Kierkegaard's works.

The key idea of "aristocratic radicalism" went on to influence most of the later works of Brandes and resulted in voluminous biographies Wolfgang Goethe (1914–15), Francois de Voltaire (1916–17), Gaius Julius Cæsar 1918 and Michelangelo (1921).

In the 1900s, Brandes fought the Danish political establishment on several occasions, but eventually had to curb his acidic attacks. However, his international reputation was growing. In many ways he emulated his own assessment of Voltaire, as an author against habitual thinking, hypocrisy and the thin veneer of morality. He condemned the maltreatment of national minorities, the persecution of Alfred Dreyfus, etc. During World War I, he condemned the national aggression and imperialism on both sides and his last years were dedicated to anti-religious polemic. In this late period he made new connections to intellectuals like Henri Barbusse and Romain Rolland when he was co-signer in the foundation of Clarté, as well as E. D. Morel.

Brandes argued against the historicity of Jesus and was a proponent of the Christ myth theory. He published Sagnet om Jesus which was translated as Jesus: A Myth in 1926. He was an atheist.

== Legacy ==
Brandes stands as one of the most influential inspirations of Danish culture, an equal of Holberg, Grundtvig and Ansgar. Among his supporters, Brandes' work was seen as a liberator from repressive norms, authority and hypocrisy, and he served as an inspiration for many contemporary writers. On the other hand, conservative circles condemned him as an immoral, unpatriotic and subversive blasphemer; as he became the lynchpin of criticism against modernity in its entirety. At the same time, some socialists criticized his elitist attitudes, while some feminists have regarded his attitude of sexual equality as being inconsequential.

His brother Edvard (1847–1931), also a well-known critic, was the author of a number of plays, and of two psychological novels: A Politician (1889), and Young Blood (1899). He became an outstanding political figure of the party Det Radikale Venstre.

== Books ==
- An Essay on the Aristocratic Radicalism of Friedrich Nietzsche. (1889)
- Søren Kierkegaard: A Critical Presentation in Outline (Søren Kierkegaard: En kritisk Fremstilling i Grundrids) (1877)
- Main Currents in 19th Century Literature (1872–1890)

== See also ==
- Helen Zelezny-Scholz
- Nordic sexual morality debate
