= Sara Omar =

Danish-Kurdish author and activist

- سارا عومه‌ر
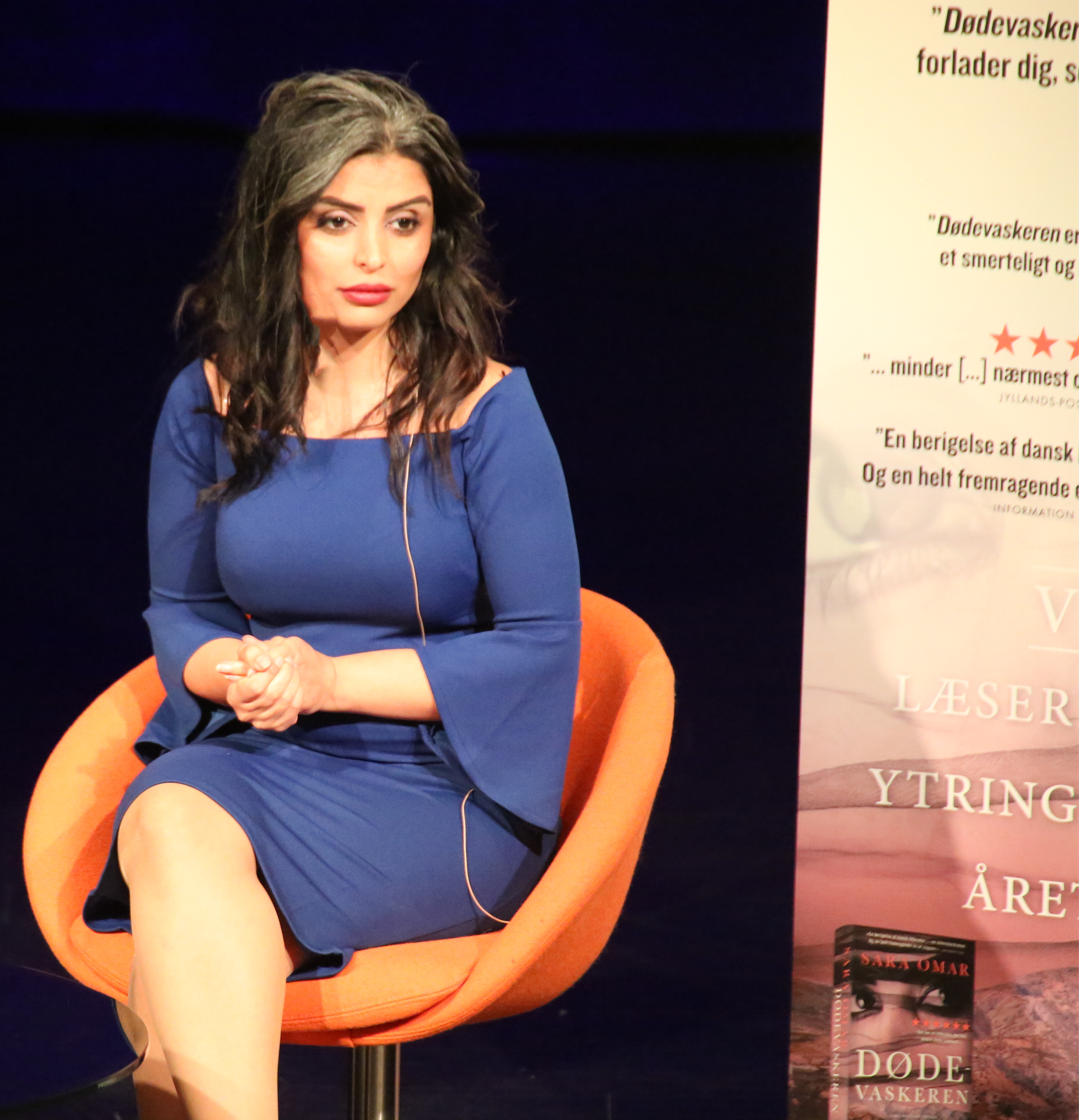
- Born: Sulaymaniyah, Iraqi Kurdistan
- Citizenship: Denmark
- Occupations: Novelist, columnist
- Writing career
- Period: 2004 – present
- Genres: Fiction, social realism, poetry, social criticism
- Notable work: Dead Washer
- Notable awards: Freedom of Speech Award 2018; Reader's Book Award 2018; Victor Award 2018; Artbeat Award 2018, Danmarks kulturformidlingspris

Sara Omar (Kurdish: سارا عومه‌ر) is a Danish-Kurdish author, human rights activist, and poet. She is the first internationally recognized female novelist from Kurdistan Region of Iraq. She started out as a poet and has published several critical articles in the Middle Eastern media.

Omar grew up in Kurdistan Region but became a refugee from war in the late 1990s. She has lived in Denmark since 2001. Omar's breakthrough novel Dødevaskeren (Dead Washer) was published in November 2017. Two years later, a sequel, Skyggedanseren (Shadow Dancer), was published.

== Early life and education ==
Sara Omar was born in the city of Sulaymaniah in Kurdistan. She grew up during the Iran-Iraq War (1980-1988), which developed into the Iraq-Kuwait conflict (1990-1991), also known as the Gulf War. She lived in the neighboring town of Halabja during the poison gas attack on March 16, 1988.

Omar lived in Kurdistan during the Anfal campaign, the genocide against the Kurds, in the late 1980s. Many of her relatives fell victim to the war, which lasted from 1986 to 1989. This war serves as the backdrop for Omar's novels. Because of the war, she had to flee Kurdistan at a young age, coming to Denmark as a 15-year-old, where she finished her secondary schooling and began university.

She studied law before switching to complete a bachelor's degree in political science.

== Career ==
In 2012, Omar participated in WEYA, an international festival for 1,000 of the world's most talented young poets from 100 different countries. Omar tried to publish her literary works in the Middle East but was rejected. For many years she wrote under a pseudonym, pretending to be a man.

Since 2004, Omar has written poetry and critical essays in the Middle Eastern media on female genital mutilation, incest, sexual assault, honor crimes, honor killings, social control, oppression of women, and the rights of homosexuals, the disabled, children and women in patriarchal societies.

Omar published a poem in the literary magazine Kritiker in 2014, entitled "The River of Pain That Continues Its Wandering". She also contributed the poem Barndommens tavshed (Childhood Silence) in the anthology Ord på flugt (Words on the run), published by Danish PEN. The anthology was written by authors and journalists who had all fled war-torn countries.

On 30 November 2017, Omar's debut novel Dødevaskeren was published, for which she received the Readers' Book Prize.

Two years later, on 26 November 2019, the sequel Skyggedanseren was published, which was awarded the booksellers' literature prize, De Gyldne Laurbær.

Both of Omar's novels are published by Politikens Forlag, and they have been translated into Swedish, Norwegian, Serbian, Macedonian and French.

In 2019, Omar opened the Danish literary event Bogforum in Bellacenteret, Copenhagen, and has given the opening speech at CPH:DOX in 2020.

In 2020, 'the dead washer' was published in France. Le Point soon claimed the book as one of the 30 most important publications in France in 2020.

== Human Rights activism ==
Omar has participated in many events focusing on vulnerable people and victims of violence. She has given presentations on honor-related crimes, sexual liberation, and negative social control for the Nordic Federation of Societies of Obstetrics and Gynecology, on her novel Dødevaskeren at the Anonymity of Violence event for the Umbrella Organization Intercultural Women's Council and the Tingbjerg Women's Association Eves Univers, at the Danish United Nations Association on what Denmark must fight for on the UN Commission on Women, and at Mino Denmark for International Women's Day. She has appeared in campaigns for Amnesty International and for Danner, where she participated in the "Life after Violence" project on abused and vulnerable children and women.

Omar is an ambassador for DIGNITY - the Danish Institute against Torture, the Danish Women's Society, the youth organization Crossing Borders and the Swedish organization GAPF, which fights honor-related violence.

Shortly after the release of Dødevaskeren, Omar was invited to give a New Year's speech in Deadline on DR2, where she focused on the violent world in which some Muslim women live.

Omar sits on the Expert Advisory Panel for the Arts & Globalization Communication Group.

== Awards ==
Omar received the Erik Hoffmeyer's travel grant in 2015, the Ytringsfrihedsprisen (Freedom of Speech Award) in 2018, Victor of the Year 2018, and the Artbeat award in 2018.

In 2018, Omar won the Readers' Book Prize for Dødevaskeren, and the 2019 De Gyldne Laurbær for Skyggedanseren. In 2019, she received the Danish Institute for Human Rights' Human Rights Award, her speech later published as a column in Jyllands-Posten.

In 2019, she received the Martin Andersen Nexø Foundation's literary prize together with Sofie Jama and Aydin Soei. The three authors received the award because they each "represent voices that will develop and shape the immigrant debate and help change the understanding of migration both from within and without." In addition, Omar received the 2019 ELLE Style Awards as Woman of the Year "for her novel The Death Washer, which unveils a man-chauvinistic culture that has taken Islam hostage".

Omar was awarded the 2019 Human Rights Prize, by the Danish Institute for Human Rights.

Her novel Skyggedanseren won De Gyldne Laurbær in 2020.

== Bibliography ==
=== Magazines, newspapers and debates ===
- Den konfliktfyldte unge i et samfund, der er ligeglad. The Voices. 2006.

=== Literature ===
- The poem Floden af smerte, der fortsætter sin vandring, from the Swedish anthology "Ett inskränkt öde och ett besinningslöst". KRITIKER. 2014. No. 33. ISBN 978-91-87605-10-9.
- The poem Barndommens tavshed from the anthology "Ord på flugt". Dansk PEN. 2016. ISBN 978-87-98981-29-9
- Dødevaskeren. Politikens Forlag. 2017. ISBN 978-87-400-2697-9
- Skyggedanseren. Politikens Forlag. 2019. ISBN 978-87-400-5231-2
