= Nordkraft (novel) =

2002 novel by Jakob Ejersbo

Nordkraft is a 2002 Danish novel by Jakob Ejersbo. It is mainly set in Aalborg in the early 1990s and is about Maria (who is confused and unable to leave her drug-dealer boyfriend Asger), Allan (who is trying to put his dubious past behind him) and Steso-Thomas. The three main characters find themselves in a dependent but enthusiastic dance with drugs as they constantly search for eternal intoxication.

The book sold more than 100,000 copies, an unusually high sales figure on the book market in Denmark. The novel was adapted in 2005 as the film Nordkraft, also released as Angels in Fast Motion, written for the screen and directed by Ole Christian Madsen.

== Sources ==
- https://web.archive.org/web/20080817040909/http://www.litteratursiden.dk/sw5737.asp
