= Cultural radicalism =

Movement in Nordic culture

Cultural radicalism (Danish: Kulturradikalisme) was a movement in first Danish, but later also Nordic culture in general. It was particularly strong in the Interwar Period, but its philosophy has its origin in the 1870s and a great deal of modern social commentary still refer to it.

At the time of the height of the cultural radical movement it was referred to as modern. The words cultural radical and cultural radicalism was first used in an essay by Elias Bredsdorff in the broadsheet newspaper, Politiken, in 1956. Bredsdorff described cultural radicals as people who are socially responsible with an international outlook.

Cultural radicalism has usually been described as the heritage of Georg Brandes's Modern Breakthrough, the foundation and early editorials of the newspaper Politiken, the foundation of the political party Radikale Venstre, to the magazine Kritisk Revy by Poul Henningsen (PH).

The values most commonly associated with cultural radicalism are among others: criticism of religion, opposition to social norms, criticism of Victorian sexual morality, anti-militarism and an openness to new cultural input other than the classic western (e.g. jazz, modern architecture, art, literature and theater).

== Internationally ==
Cultural radicalism is also used outside of Denmark. In Scandinavia, it often refers to the Danish movement, but elsewhere, the concept may just share the etymology. In Sweden, cultural radicalism has been seen as opposition to the Swedish church and to the Neo-Victorian sexual moral. In Norway the movement has been associated with the magazine Mot Dag in 1930s and its authors such as Sigurd Hoel and Arnulf Øverland. In the US, cultural radicalism is sometimes used as the opposite of cultural conservatism, especially in the context of culture wars.

== Cultural radicals ==
- Kjeld Abell
- Edvard Brandes
- Georg Brandes
- Bernhard Christensen
- Mogens Fog
- Poul Henningsen
- Edvard Heiberg
- Viggo Hørup
- Hans Kirk
- Klaus Rifbjerg
- Ove Rode
- Hans Scherfig
- Tøger Seidenfaden
- August Strindberg

== See also ==
- Modern Breakthrough
- Politiken
- Radikale Venstre
- Russian nihilist movement
