= Jane Aamund =

Danish author and journalist (1936–2019)

- Born: Jane Weibel Aamund; 8 November 1936; Frederiksberg, Denmark
- Died: 29 January 2019 (aged 82); Hvide Sande, Denmark
- Occupation: Author
- Writing career
- Language: Danish
- Period: 1989–2019
- Notable works: Klinkevals, Colorado drømme
- Notable awards: De Gyldne Laurbær, 1998
- Website: janeaamund.dk

Jane Aamund (8 November 1936 – 29 January 2019) was a Danish author and journalist. Her breakthrough in Denmark came with the Klinkevals trilogy.

== Biography ==
She was the sister of the Danish businessman Asger Aamund. She was married thrice and had two sons. She was educated in English language correspondence. From 1954 to 1968 she worked as a freelance journalist. From 1973 to 1978 she was working with PR at the Danish company Birger Christensen. From 1973 to 1978 she studied Spanish Language at Colorado State University. From 1980 she worked at Berlingske Tidende. From 1997 she became a full time author. She died at Anker Fjord Hospice in Hvide Sande at the age of 82 after a longer period of illness.

== Works ==
Sources:

- Klinkevals (English: The two penny dance) – 1989 ISBN 9788759021323
- Juliane Jensen – 1990
- Oven vande (English: Afloat) – 1992
- Bag damen stod en Christian (English Behind the lady stood a Christian) – 1994
- Colorado drømme (English: Colorado dreams) – 1997
- Danskernes lille verden (English: The small world of the Danes) – 1997
- Den grønne port (English: The green gate) – 1998
- Kamæleonen (English: The Chameleon) – 1999
- Den hvide verden (English: The white world) – 2000
- Vesten for måne (English: West of moon) – 2002
- Den irske stemme (English: The Irish voice) – 2003
- Udlængsel (English: Wanderlust) – 2004
- De grønne skove (English: The green forests) – 2008
- Smeltediglen (English: The crucible) – 2009
- Dengang det var sjovt (English: Back when it was fun) – 2010
- Øjebliksbilleder (English: Snapshots) – 2010
- Vindue uden udsigt (English: Window without a view) – 2011
- Samtaler om natten - 2018
- Bjergsted drømme - 2019

== Recognition ==
Aamund won multiple awards:

- Den Berlingske Fonds Journalistpris (English: The Berlingske Foundation Journalist Award) in 1997
- Bog & Idé-prisen (Danskernes Yndlingsforfatter) in 1997, 1998, 1999 and 2004
- De Gyldne Laurbær in 1998 for Colorado drømme
