= Helle Stangerup =

Danish novelist (1939–2015)

- Born: Eva Helle Stangerup; 30 October 1939; Frederiksberg, Denmark
- Died: 29 March 2015 (aged 75); Denmark
- Occupation: Novelist
- Years active: 1967–2011
- Spouse: Adam Vilhelm Josef Knuth af Knuthenborg (m. 1969; div. 1979)
- Children: 2
- Awards: De Gyldne Laurbær

Eva Helle Stangerup (30 October 1939 – 29 March 2015) was a Danish crime and thriller novelist. She published her first novel Gravskrift for Rødhætte in 1967 and followed it with her breakthrough work Gule handsker a year later. Stangerup's most successful work was Christine published in 1985 and it became the best-selling novel in Denmark in the 1980s. Her works have been published in other languages such as Czech, Dutch, English, Finnish, French, German, Norwegian and Swedish and she was voted the winner of literary prizes such as the De Gyldne Laurbær.

== Early life ==
Stangerup was born in Frederiksberg, Denmark on 30 October 1939. She was the daughter of the university professor Carl Hakon Strangerup and the actress Betty Helene Eva Voss Stangerup (née Söderberg). Stangerup was the great-grandchild of the Swedish author Hjalmar Söderberg and her brother was the Danish writer Henrik Stangerup. When she was at school, she was a childhood friend of the future Margrethe II of Denmark. Stangerup was sent to boarding school in Switzerland and the United Kingdom and graduated from N. Zahle's School in 1959. She went on to enrol at the University of Copenhagen, where she trained as a lawyer, and graduated as a Candidate of Law seven years later.

== Career ==
A year after her graduation, Stangerup made her debut as a writer with the crime novel Gravskrift for Rødhætte in 1967. Her breakthrough publication was another crime novel called Gule handsker published in 1968 and set in Denmark. Stangerup went on to author the novels Spejldans in 1969, Diamanter er dydens laun in 1970, Solsikkerne in 1972, the psychological thriller Ulvetid in 1980 following a lengthy break from writing and Den tibetanske maske in 1981. In 1982, Stangerup worked as a correspondent in Siberia and Antarctica.

She published the historical novel Christine about the 16th century daughter of Christian II of Denmark known as Princess Christina of Denmark in 1985. Stangerup's objective of the novel was to convey "the power and influence that women had before they fell victim to the moral view of Victorianism and changed social conditions, which caused the better off to fall into vacancy, wigs and powder". The book became the best-selling novel in 1980s Denmark, and won the De Gyldne Laurbær that same year. The novel was translated by Anne Born as In the Courts of Power three years later.

In 1989, Stangerup published the novel Spardame about Leonora Christina Ulfeldt, after working as the author of screenplays of dramas which were broadcast on Danish television two years earlier. This was followed by her receiving the Thit Jensens Forfatter Legat in 1990 and her releasing the novel Sankt Markus nat based in the period of the Reformation two years later. By that time, Stangerup's works were selling about 100,000 copies every year and became popular in German and Sweden as well. She wrote the modern suspense thriller Stedfar in 1996. Three years later, Stangerup published Saxo: Danmarkskrøniken. She authored a literary biography on Christina of Denmark called Christine, which was released in 2002. Stangerup published her memoirs, Bag skodderne, in 2011. Her works have been published in other languages such as Czech, Dutch, English, Finnish, French, German, Norwegian and Swedish.

== Personal life ==
She was a Protestant. Stangerup was married to the landowner County Count Adam Vilhelm Josef Knuth af Knuthenborg from 25 July 1969 until their divorce in 1979. They had two children. She died from a long illness on 29 March 2015.
