= Modern Breakthrough =

Literature movement in Scandinavia

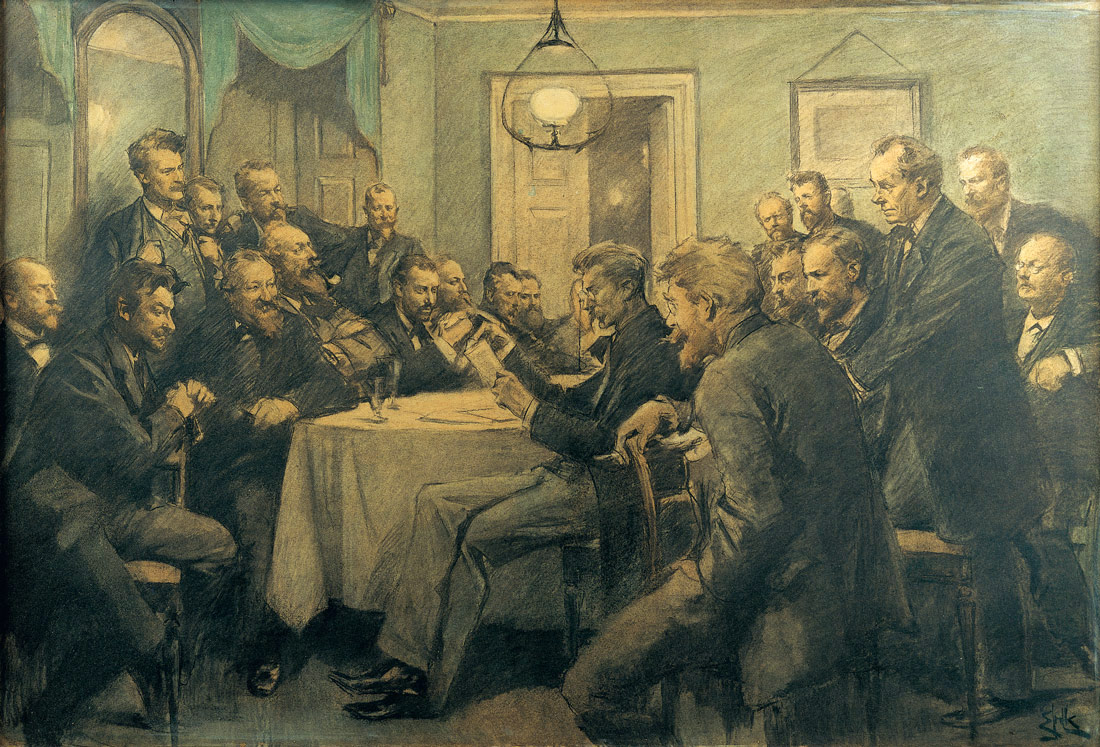
A meeting in the association Bogstaveligheden on 1 March 1882. Seated from left: Erik Skram, Georg Brandes, Sophus Schandorph, Holger Drachmann, Edvard Brandes, Viggo Johansen, August Jerndorff, Herman Trier, J.P. Jacobsen, P.S. Krøyer, Karl Madsen, Pietro Krohn, Kristian Zahrtmann. Standing from left: F. Hendriksen, Karl Gjellerup, Otto Borchsenius, Hans Nic. Hansen, Martinus Galschiøt, Laurits Tuxen, Harald Høffding, Michael Ancher. Drawn by Erik Henningsen, c. 1910

The Modern Breakthrough (Danish: Det moderne gennembrud; Norwegian: Det moderne gjennombrudd; Swedish: Det moderna genombrottet) was a movement of naturalism and debating literature of Scandinavia which replaced romanticism near the end of the 19th century.

The term "The Modern Breakthrough" is used about the period 1870–1890 in the history of literature in Scandinavia, which in this period had a breakthrough from the rest of Europe. Danish theorist Georg Brandes is often considered to be the "wire-puller" behind the movement, although some of the authors had already begun to write in a realistic style before he formulated the aesthetic paradigm of the movement. His lectures at Copenhagen University starting 1871 and his work Main Currents in 19th Century Literature (Danish: Hovedstrømninger i det 19. Aarhundredes Litteratur) mark the beginning of the period.

== Characteristics ==
The authors during the Modern Breakthrough revolted against traditional cultural themes, especially the literary period of romanticism. The writers of the Modern Breakthrough adopted a more realistic bent. The authors of the Breakthrough also adopted more liberal views on such topics as sexuality and religion, and expressed openly their interest in scientific breakthroughs such as Charles Darwin's theory of evolution. Female writers also gained unprecedented influence during this time.

== Course of events ==
The very beginning of The Modern is usually attributed to Georg Brandes, who already in 1869 translated the controversial essay The Subjection of Women by John Stuart Mill into Danish. In the following years, Brandes lectured at Copenhagen University and after that in most of Europe with criticism of romanticism. He also wrote books and articles on the subject, and especially Main Currents in 19th Century Literature, which was published in several volumes from 1872 important as a theoretical basis for the literature of the time.

A number of the other authors of the period had international contacts, and many of them lived abroad in shorter periods. In this way, there were small colonies of Scandinavian artists in cities such as Paris, Berlin and Rome, and some of the artists published literature directly in foreign languages. In any case, their works were translated much faster than previously, and the movement thus had its breakthrough.

In the 1890s, the movement was in part replaced by Symbolism, originating in many of the authors' interest in subjects of a religious or spiritual nature. But the realism in the Modern Breakthrough has influenced later authors such as Selma Lagerlöf, Johannes V. Jensen and Martin Andersen Nexø in the following years (1900–1920), which some call the popular breakthrough (Danish: "Det Folkelige Gennembrud"), because the authors in this period write about the lower rungs of society, e.g. Martin Andersen Nexø's Pelle the Conqueror, which was adapted into a film in 1987.

The cultural radical movement of 1920–1940 is often characterized as the continuation of the Modern Breakthrough, or the Modern Breakthrough as the beginning of Cultural Radicalism.

== Authors ==
Among famous authors in the Modern Breakthrough are:

- Denmark:
  - Georg Brandes
  - J.P. Jacobsen (partly)
  - Henrik Pontoppidan
  - Karl Gjellerup
  - Helga Johansen
  - Holger Drachmann
  - Herman Bang
  - Sophus Schandorph
  - Johan Skjoldborg
- Norway:
  - Henrik Ibsen (partly)
  - Bjørnstjerne Bjørnson
  - Alexander Kielland
  - Jonas Lie
  - Arne Garborg
  - Hans Jæger
  - Amalie Skram
- Sweden:
  - August Strindberg (partly)
  - Ellen Key
  - Viktor Rydberg (partly)
  - Victoria Benedictsson
  - Mathilda Malling

== See also ==
- Nordic sexual morality debate

== Literature ==
- Brandes, Georg (1906). Main Currents in Nineteenth Century Literature, Volume I: The Emigrant Literature. London: William Heinemann.
- Brandes, Georg (1902). Main Currents in Nineteenth Century Literature, Volume II: The Romantic School in Germany. New York: The Macmillan Company.
- Brandes, Georg (1906). Main Currents in Nineteenth Century Literature, Volume III: The Reaction in France. London: William Heinemann.
- Brandes, Georg (1905). Main Currents in Nineteenth Century Literature, Volume IV: Naturalism in England. London: William Heinemann.
- Brandes, Georg (1904). Main Currents in Nineteenth Century Literature, Volume V: The Romantic School in France. London: William Heinemann.
- Brandes, Georg (1906). Main Currents in Nineteenth Century Literature, Volume VI: Young Germany. London: William Heinemann.
- Sørensen, Jørgen, ed. (1974). Fronter 1870-1890 - en tekstmontage. Copenhagen: Gyldendal. ISBN 87-00-41601-0.
- Stangerup, Hakon (1946). Kulturkampen 1-2. Copenhagen: Gyldendal.
- Hertel, Hans (2004). Det stadig moderne gennembrud : Georg Brandes og hans tid, set fra det 21. århundrede. Copenhagen: Gyldendal. ISBN 87-03-00576-3.
