= Anna Ladegaard =

Danish writer

- Born: 14 December 1913; Aarhus, Denmark
- Died: 16 May 2000 (aged 86)
- Occupation: Writer

Anna Ladegaard (14 December 1913 in Aarhus- 16 May 2000) was a Danish writer.

== Biography ==
Born in Aarhus, Ladegaard studied at Pitman's College in London. In 1952-53 she worked at the Danish Embassy in Stockholm and in 1953 she moved to Southern Rhodesia, living in Bulawayo and Salisbury. She returned to Denmark in 1960.

Ladegaard began writing in the 1930s, often documenting her travels and writing short stories and articles for newspapers. She published her debut novel Opbrud i oktober in October 1966, a psychological novel set in Rhodesia. The novel was followed by Hvor var Hannah Jacoby? in 1968, a novel about a Danish woman who survives a concentration camp. This was followed by novels such as Udenfor sæsonen (1970), Alle mine (1972), Svens familie (1977), Günters anden verden (1983), Her på bjerget (1988) and Genfortælling (1993). Ladegaard's novels were typically realistic and intense, and explored characters with a destiny. In 1974 she was awarded the Golden Laurel Award. She was also a recipient of Aage Krarup-Nielsen's Mindelegat.
