= Birgithe Kosovic =

Danish journalist and author

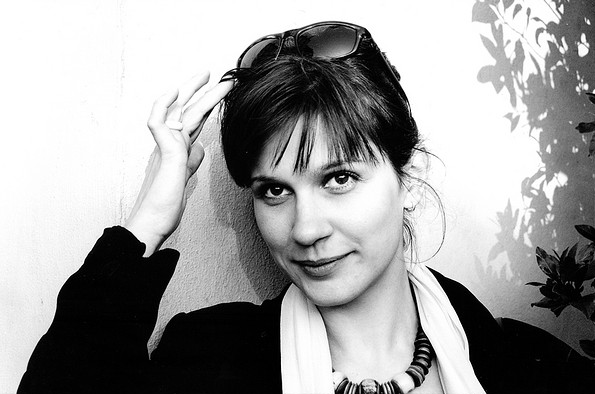
- Birgithe Kosovic, 12 February 2007
- Born: 22 March 1972 (age 54); Albertslund, Denmark
- Occupations: Journalist, novelist
- Writing career
- Genre: Journalism
- Notable work: Det dobbelte land
- Website: www.detdobbelteland.dk

Birgithe Kosovic (born 22 March 1972) is a Danish journalist and author who has received several awards for her novel Det dobbelte land (literally The Doubled Country, 2010) based on her family's background in the former Yugoslavia.

== Biography ==
Born in Albertslund, Kosovic was brought up by her Serbian father and Danish mother. She decided to become an author after taking part in a writing competition in her early years at primary school. While studying Danish at Copenhagen University, she worked as a feature journalist for the Danish newspaper Information and the Norwegian Morgenbladet. Her debut as a novelist was in 1997 with Legenden om Villa Valmarena (The Legend of Villa Valmarena) about a female dwarf at the beginning of the 19th century. It was followed in 1999 by Om natten i Jerusalem (Nighttime in Jerusalem) inspired by Karen Blixen's exotic life and writings.

== Det dobbelte land ==
Her most successful work has been Det dobbelte land (The Doubled Country) for which she has received several awards and grants including Weekendavisen's Literature Prize (2010), Danmarks Radio's Novel Prize (2011) and Danske Bank's Literature Prize (2011). Basing her story on authentic characters, some from her own Serbian family, she tells the story of how in the mountains of Croatia, Milovan receives a letter informing him that his wife has died. This leads to a review of his past life. Twenty years earlier, he had given up his post as party secretary, deceived his wife with his best friend's pregnant wife and refused to use his influence to prevent the imprisonment of his own son. Now, in the early 1990s, he is surrounded by Croatian nationalists who are trying to rid themselves of Serbs like Milovan himself. The novel develops into a tale of guilt and shame, bringing us face to face with what lies behind the facade of the toughest men of the times. The reader is led to wonder why Milovan has become so cynical and why he deserted his wife. It also encourages reflection on the wider implications of the Yugoslavian clashes.

Translated into Serbian as Dvostruka zemlja, the book was presented to Serbian readers at the 2011 Belgrade Book Fair. Kosovic explained that she had been attracted to the art of story-telling from an early age as her father used to tell her stories of Yugoslavia, always full of lively characters experiencing both good and evil.
