= Martha Christensen =

American botanist (1932–2017)

Dr. Martha Christensen (born 4 January 1932, Ames, died 19 March 2017, Madison) was an American mycologist, botanist and educator known as an expert in fungal taxonomy and ecology, particularly for soil-dwelling fungi in the genera Aspergillus and Penicillium.

== Education and career ==
Christensen received her B.S. degree in 1953 from the University of Nebraska, and M.S. and Ph.D. degrees in botany from the University of Wisconsin–Madison. She was hired as the first female faculty member in the Department of Botany at the University of Wyoming in 1963.

== Service and awards ==
She served as president of the Mycological Society of America from 1987 to 1988, and received the organization's William A. Weston Award in teaching excellence in 1991. In 2013 she received the Johanna Westerdijk Award from the Westerdijk Fungal Biodiversity Institute. As a conservationist she served as a board member and volunteer for the Wyoming Outdoor Council

== Research ==
Christensen's research covered a wide variety of mycological topics, and she was supported in that work by over 60 grants. Over the course of her career she gathered a large freeze-dried fungal spore collection that was eventually donated to the Westerdijk Fungal Biodiversity Institute. The species Penicillium christenseniae, Penicillium marthae-christenseniae, and Aspergillus christenseniae were named in her honor.

The standard author abbreviation M.Chr. is used to indicate this person as the author when citing a botanical name.
