= HNoMS Uthaug =

HNoMS Uthaug may refer to one of the following submarines of the Royal Norwegian Navy:

- HNoMS Uthaug (P29), a British V-class submarine sold to Norway in 1946, formerly HMS Votary
- HNoMS Uthaug (1965), a Kobben-class submarine, commissioned in 1965; transferred to the Royal Danish Navy in 1989; renamed HDMS Sælen
- HNoMS Uthaug (1990), an Ula-class submarine, commissioned in 1991 and in active service

== See also ==
- Uthaug (disambiguation)
