= Jens Christian Grøndahl =

Danish writer (born 1959)

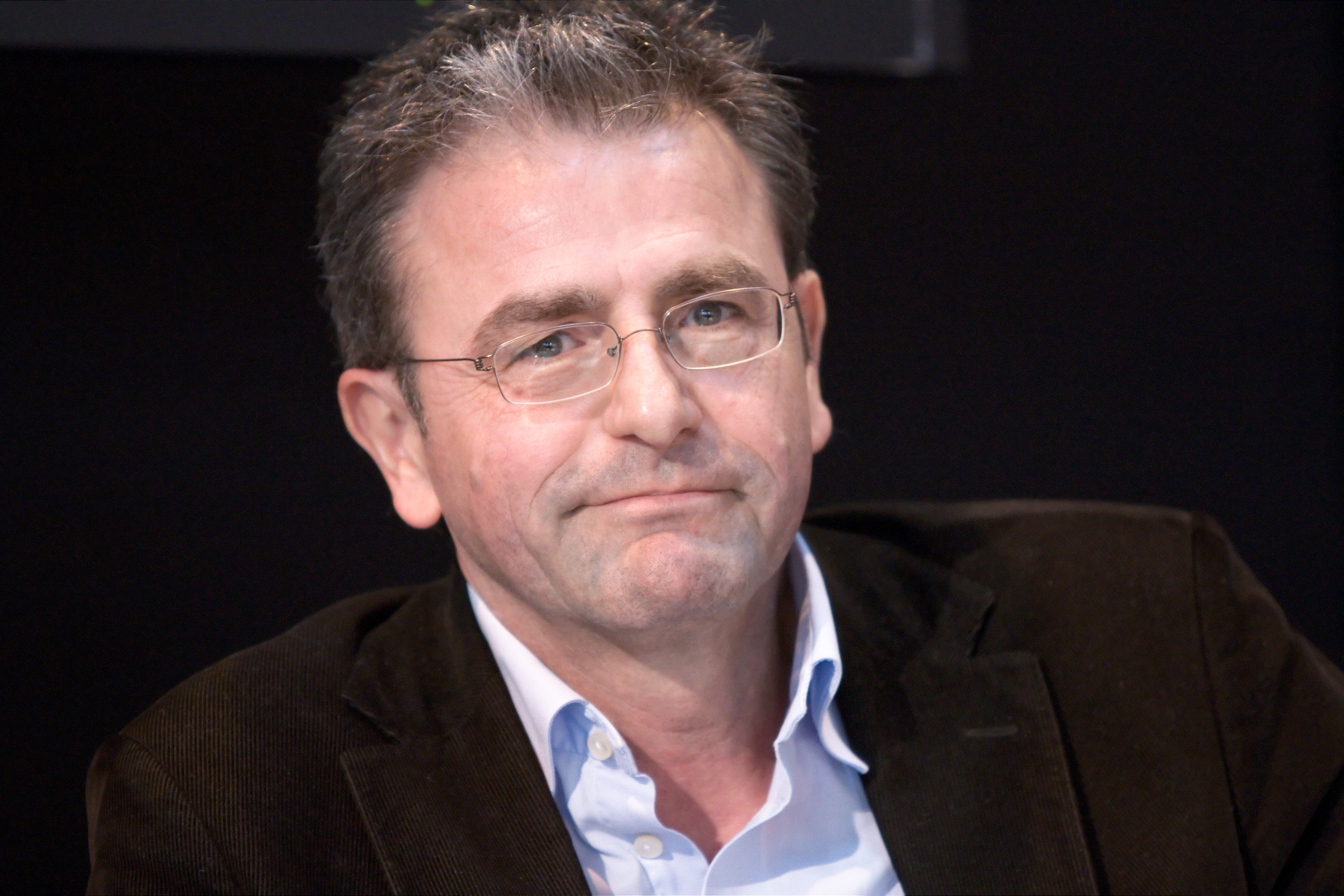
Jens Christian Grøndahl in March 2010

Jens Christian Grøndahl (born 9 November 1959 in Lyngby) is a Danish writer.

His novel An Altered Light was shortlisted for the 2006 International Dublin Literary Award.

In 1998 he won the Danish booksellers award De Gyldne Laurbær (The Golden Laurel) for his novel Lucca.

In 2017, Grøndahl went on the record stating that "It's never the woman's fault if a man decides to attack her. But, that said...well, when I look at the picture of the victim, the way she let herself be photographed, the look she gives the camera...I can't help but think that this is a girl who's looking for trouble." regarding the beheading of journalist Kim Wall. He later apologized for his words, saying that it was "completely disrespectful to the victim and the survivors" and emphasizing that he "stands on the side of women in the debate about, for example, the Me Too movement", about which he also wrote a column, adding that it is one of the most important development of our times.

== Bibliography ==
- Kvinden i midten - 1985
- Syd for floden - 1986
- Rejsens bevægelser - 1988
- Det indre blik - 1990
- Skyggen i dit sted - 1991
- Dagene skilles - 1992
- Stilheden i glas - 1993
- Indian summer - 1994
- Tavshed i oktober - 1996 (translated into English by Anne Born, Silence in October 2000)
- Lucca - 1998 (translated into English under same title 2002)
- Hjertelyd - 1999
- Virginia - 2000 (translated into English by Anne Born under same title, 2003)
- Et andet lys - 2002 (translated into English by Anne Born, An Altered Light 2005)
- Piazza Bucarest - 2004 (translated into Romanian by Carmen Vioreanu, 2013)
- Røde hænder - 2006
- Tre skridt tilbage - 2007 (essays)
- Den tid det tager - 2008
- Fire dage i marts - 2009
- Om en time springer træerne ud - 2010
- Det gør du ikke - 2010
- Før vi siger farvel - 2012
- Den sibriske måne - 2013
