= Maren Uthaug =

Norwegian, Sami and Danish comics creator and writer

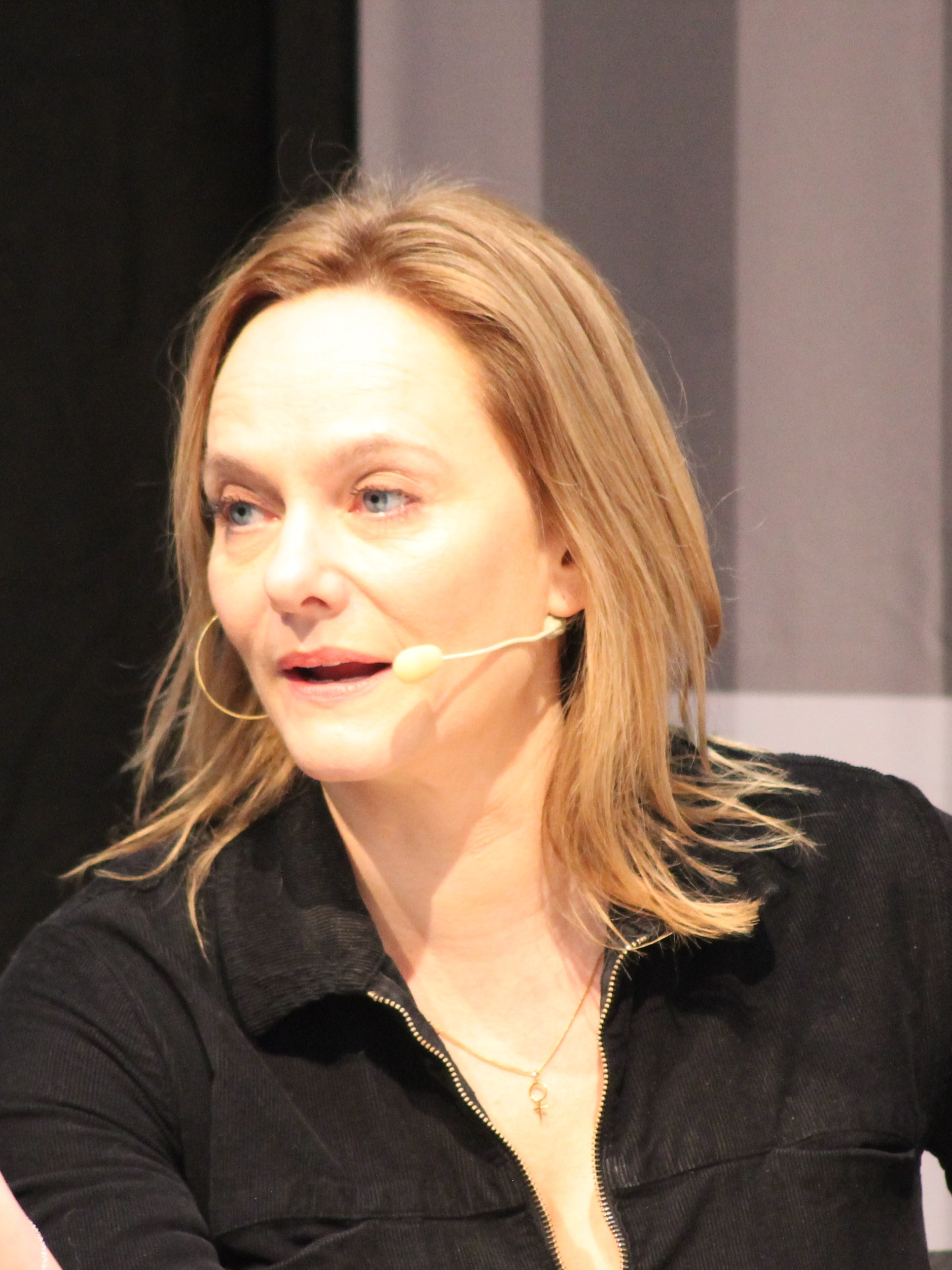
- Born: 1972 (age 53–54); Kautokeino, Norway
- Occupations: Comics creator and novelist
- Awards: De Gyldne Laurbær (2022)

Maren Uthaug (born 7 October 1972) is a Norwegian, Sámi and Danish comics creator and writer. Her comic strip Ting jeg gjorde is published regularly in the newspaper Politiken. She received the award De Gyldne Laurbær for 2022.

== Early life ==
Born in Kautokeino Municipality, Norway, in 1972, Uthaug moved to Denmark in 1980, at the age of seven, and eventually settled in Copenhagen.

Her father was a Sámi from Tana, Norway; her mother was from Trøndelag county, or trøndersk.

== Career ==
She is a columnist for the Danish newspaper Politiken, where she publishes the comic strip Ting jeg gjorde.

Her book debut was Det er gøy å være same from 2010, a collection of satirical comic strips. Her novel debut was Sådan blev det from 2013, about a little girl moving to Denmark along with her father. Her 2017 novel Hvor der er fugle is set in the coastal districts of Trøndelag. She released the novel En lykkelig slutning in 2019, a family chronicle over several generations. In 2022 she published the novel 11 %, depicting a dysfunctional society controlled by women, without free men. The novel was awarded De Gyldne Laurbær for 2022.
