= Jakob Ejersbo =

Danish journalist and writer

Jakob Ejersbo (6 April 1968, in Rødovre – 10 July 2008, in Aalborg) was a Danish journalist and writer. His work is considered modern and neorealistic. Authoring the immensely popular novel, Nordkraft, which sold more than 100,000 copies, an unusually high sales figure on the book market in Denmark, Ejersbo became an established writer. A tale about three young people and drug problems in Aalborg, the work was turned into a film in 2005, directed by Ole Christian Madsen. Ejersbo is also well known for writing what is known as the Africa Trilogy (the three novels, Liberty, Revolution and Eksil), inspired by the author's own childhood experiences in Tanzania.

The trilogy was published posthumously, however. Jakob Ejersbo died from a malign case of esophageal cancer after an illness period of only 10 months.

Johannes Riis, the publishing editor at the major Danish publishing house, Gyldendal, spoke at the funeral, saying, "Og nu står jeg så her, i en frysende klar og ubarmhjertig bevidsthed om, at jeg i løbet af det sidste års tid har været vidne til noget af det mest urimelige og meningsløse, jeg har oplevet i mit liv. At se så meget originalitet, så meget talent gå til spilde og aldrig få mulighed for at komme til udfoldelse. Det er ikke til at have med at gøre" ("And now here I stand, with a freezingly clear and merciless awareness that, in the course of the past year, I have witnessed something of the most unfair and meaningless I have experienced in my life. To see so much originality, so much talent go to waste and never get the chance to unfold. It is unbearable.").

Ejersbo was not married, lived alone and had no children.

== Works ==
- 1998: Fuga, short story anthology co-written with Morten Alsinger
- 2000: Superego, short stories
- 2002: Nordkraft, novel
- 2009: Eksil, novel
- 2009: Revolution, novel
- 2009: Liberty, novel

== Awards and stipends ==
Ejersbo received the following awards and stipends:

- 2001: The Danish Arts Foundation. Stipend
- 2003: De Gyldne Laurbær for Nordkraft
- 2003: The Danish Arts Foundation. Stipend
- 2005: The Danish Arts Foundation. Stipend
- 2006: The Danish Arts Foundation. Stipend
- 2007: The Danish Arts Foundation. Stipend
