= Sophus Schandorph =

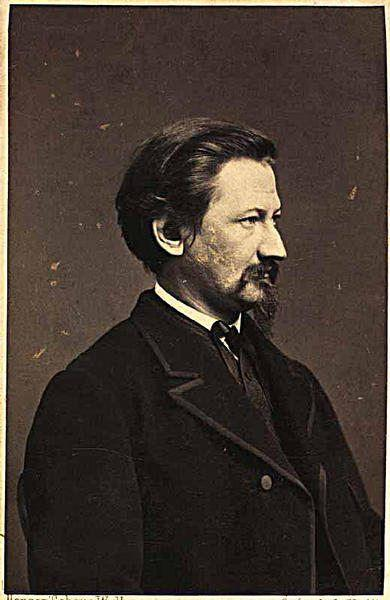
- Sophus Schandorphm Hansen, Schou & Weller, 1875
- Born: Karen Christenze Dinesen; 8 May 1836; Ringsted, Denmark
- Died: 1 January 1901 (aged 64); Copenhagen, Denmark
- Occupation: Poet
- Writing career
- Language: Danish

Sophus Christian Frederik Schandorph (or Skamdrup), known simply as Sophus Schandorph, (8 May 1836 – 1 January 1901), Danish poet and novelist, was born at Ringsted in Zealand. He was one of the men of "the Modern Break-through."

== Biography ==
Schandorph was born on 8 May 1836 in Ringsted, the son of Johan Frederik Schandorph (1790–1855) and Andrea Kirstine Møller (1804–73). In 1855 he entered the University of Copenhagen. In 1862 he published his first volume of poetry, written in the romantic style and giving little indication of the ultimate direction that his talent was to take. Other books followed, but his gifts first found full expression in a volume of rustic tales entitled Fra Provinsen (1876), in which he described provincial character and life with much frankness of detail and a great deal of wit.

In 1878 his novel, Uden Midtpunkt ("Without a Centre"), recast later in dramatic form, attracted great attention by its exposure of contemporary failings. Among the more famous of his later novels are:

- Thomas Friis' Historie (2 vols, 1881)
- Det gamle Apothek ("The Old Apothecary"[?]) (1855)
- Poet og Junker (1892)
- Helga (1900)

But his most characteristic work is to be found in his various volumes of short sketches. He published his own Recollections (Oplevelser) in 1889. He died after a long illness at Frederiksberg on New Year's Day 1901.

Schandorph is not widely read and is not considered a primary figure of the "break-through." He is a figure of influence for Henrik Pontoppidan and later regionalist and social writers.

== Bibliography ==
- Article by Vilhelm Møller in C.F. Bricka's Dansk Biografisk Lexikon (vol. xv., 1901).
