= Christian Kampmann =

Danish writer and journalist

Christian Peter Georg Kampmann (24 July 1939 – 13 September 1988) was a Danish writer and journalist who was born in Hellerup. His novels are mainly about the middle and upper classes in the post war time and until the 1980s. The books are mainly about people who has some problems finding their place in the world and their feelings, e.g. homosexuality. Kampmann was bisexual himself, and was married to piano player Therese Herman Koppel for many years and had two children.

Kampmann was involved in the Danish Gay Liberation Front from 1975 and he was editor of the journal Sexual Policy from 1975 to 1978. In 1988, he was killed at his beach house on Læsø by his cohabitant and lover, Danish author Jens Michael Schau. The murder was profiled in Jonas Poher Rasmussen's 2015 film What He Did (Det han gjorde).

== Books ==
- Blandt venner (1962), Short story collection
- Al den snak om lykke (1963), his first novel
- Ly (1965), Short story collection
- Sammen (1967), novel
- Uden navn (1969), novel
- Nærved og næsten (1969), novel
- Vi elsker mere (1970), Short story collection
- Pinde til en skønskrivers ligkiste (1971)
- En tid alene (1972), novel
- Familien Gregersen-sagaen:
  - Visse hensyn (1973)
  - Faste forhold (1974)
  - Rene linjer (spring 1975)
  - Andre måder (fall 1974)
- Fornemmelser, trilogy:
  - Fornemmelser (1977)
  - Videre trods alt (1979)
  - I glimt (1980)
- Skilles og mødes (1992), novel released after his death
