= Listed buildings in Skive Municipality =

This is a list of listed buildings in Skive Municipality, Denmark.

== The list ==
Listing name	Image	Location	Coordinates	Description
Astrup Hovedgård		Astrup Allé 1, 7870 Roslev		
Astrup Hovedgård		Astrup Allé 1, 7870 Roslev		
Astrup Hovedgård		Astrup Allé 1, 7870 Roslev		
Eskjær		Eskjærvej 21, 7870 Roslev		
Jenle		Jenlevej 6, 7870 Roslev		
Jenle		Jenlevej 6, 7870 Roslev		
Jenle		Jenlevej 6, 7870 Roslev		
Jenle		Jenlevej 6, 7870 Roslev		
Jungetgård		Jungetgårdvej 26, 7870 Roslev		
Krabbesholm		Krabbesholm Alle 15, 7800 Skive		Main wing from c. the 1560s by the Villestrup Master.
Krabbesholm		Krabbesholm Alle 15, 7800 Skive		Western side wing from the 18th century.
Krabbesholm		Krabbesholm Alle 15, 7800 Skive		Eastern side wing from the 18th century.
Krabbesholm		Krabbesholm Alle 15, 7800 Skive		Half-timbered wing dating from between 1755 and 1773 situated to the west of the main building.
Kås		Kåsvej 44, 7860 Spøttrup		
Langesgaard		Langesgårdvej 3, 7870 Roslev		
Langesgaard		Langesgårdvej 3, 7870 Roslev		
Langesgaard		Langesgårdvej 3, 7870 Roslev		
Langesgaard		Langesgårdvej 3, 7870 Roslev		
Ny Spøttrupgård		Heden 19, 7860 Spøttrup		
Ny Spøttrupgård		Heden 19, 7860 Spøttrup		
Ny Spøttrupgård		Heden 19, 7860 Spøttrup		
Salling Østergård		Østergårdsvej 1, 7870 Roslev		
Spøttrup		Borgen 6E, 7860 Spøttrup		
Strandet		Strandetvej 49, 7840 Højslev		
Stårupgård		Stårupgårdvej 10, 7840 Højslev		
Ørslev Kloster		Hejlskovvej 15, 7840 Højslev		
