= Wolf Prize in Arts =

One of six awards by the Wolf Foundation

The Wolf Prize in Arts is awarded annually by the not-for-profit Wolf Foundation in Israel. It is one of the six Wolf Prizes established by the Foundation, and has been awarded since 1981; the others are in Agriculture, Chemistry, Mathematics, Medicine and Physics, awarded since 1978. The Prize rotates annually among painting, music, architecture and sculpture.

== Laureates ==
Year	Field	Laureate(s)	Country
1981	Painting	Marc Chagall; Antoni Tàpies	Russian Empire / France; Spain
1982	Music	Vladimir Horowitz; Olivier Messiaen; Josef Tal	Russian Empire / United States; France; Israel
1983/4	Architecture	Ralph Erskine	United Kingdom / Sweden
1984/5	Sculpture	Eduardo Chillida	Spain
1986	Painting	Jasper Johns	United States
1987	Music	Isaac Stern; Krzysztof Penderecki	United States; Poland
1988	Architecture	Fumihiko Maki; Giancarlo De Carlo	Japan; Italy
1989	Sculpture	Claes Oldenburg	Sweden / United States
1990	Painting	Anselm Kiefer	Germany
1991	Music	Yehudi Menuhin; Luciano Berio	United States / United Kingdom; Italy
1992	Architecture	Frank Gehry; Jørn Utzon; Denys Lasdun	Canada / United States; Denmark; United Kingdom
1993	Sculpture	Bruce Nauman	United States
1994/5	Painting	Gerhard Richter	Germany
1995/6	Music	Zubin Mehta; György Ligeti	India; Austria; Hungary
1996/7	Architecture	Frei Otto; Aldo van Eyck	Germany; Netherlands
1998	Sculpture	James Turrell	United States
1999	Painting	Not awarded	
2000	Music	Pierre Boulez; Riccardo Muti	France; Italy
2001	Architecture	Álvaro Siza	Portugal
2002/3	Painting	Louise Bourgeois	France / United States
2004	Music	Mstislav Rostropovich; Daniel Barenboim	Russia; Argentina / Israel / Palestine / Spain
2005	Architecture	Jean Nouvel	France
2006/7	Painting	Michelangelo Pistoletto	Italy
2008	Music	Giya Kancheli; Claudio Abbado	Georgia; Italy
2010	Architecture	David Chipperfield; Peter Eisenman	United Kingdom; United States
2011	Painting	Rosemarie Trockel	Germany
2012	Music	Plácido Domingo; Simon Rattle	Spain; United Kingdom
2013	Architecture	Eduardo Souto de Moura	Portugal
2014	Sculpture	Olafur Eliasson	Denmark
2015	Music	Jessye Norman; Murray Perahia	United States; United States
2016	Architecture	Phyllis Lambert	Canada
2017	Painting / Sculpture	Laurie Anderson; Lawrence Weiner	United States; United States
2018	Music	Paul McCartney; Ádám Fischer	United Kingdom; Hungary
2019	Architecture	Moshe Safdie	Israel
2020	Painting / Sculpture	Cindy Sherman	United States
2021	Music	Stevie Wonder; Olga Neuwirth	United States; Austria
2022	Architecture	Elizabeth Diller; Momoyo Kaijima; Yoshiharu Tsukamoto	United States; Japan; Japan
2023	Sculpture	Fujiko Nakaya; Richard Long	Japan; United Kingdom
2024	Music	György Kurtág	Romania / Hungary
2025	Architecture	Xu Tiantian	China

== Laureates per country ==
Below is a chart of all laureates per country (updated to 2025 laureates). Some laureates are counted more than once if they have multiple citizenships.

Country	Number of laureates
United States	17
United Kingdom	7
France	5
Italy	5
Japan	4
Spain	4
Germany	4
Israel	3
Hungary	3
Russia	3
Sweden	2
Portugal	2
Austria	2
Denmark	2
Canada	2
India	1
Palestine	1
Argentina	1
Poland	1
Netherlands	1
Georgia	1
Romania	1
China	1

== Notes and references ==
- Wolf Prizes 2015
- Wolf Prizes 2016
- Wolf Prizes 2018
- Wolf Prize 2020
- Wolf Prize 2025
