= Four Boxes Gallery =

Coordinates: 56°34′22.8″N 9°3′3.9″E

The Four Boxes Gallery is a modern art gallery in the grounds of Krabbesholm Højskole near Skive, Denmark. The gallery was designed by the Japanese architects Atelier Bow-Wow, and is a three-storey building conceived as four stacked boxes used to exhibit work by both students of the Krabbesholm Højskole and invited artists. The school arranges 6-8 exhibitions each year featuring the work of artists, architects and designers from Denmark and abroad.

The 250 square meter gallery is set on the green lawn of the school between the Craftsmen’s School and the red brick Idé-Pro factory. The modern concrete structure is designed as four stacked boxes. The lower two boxes form outdoor galleries and an indoor gallery. The box in the middle is a smaller exhibition room, and the box at the top is a private workshop and living space for the artist in residence. The building has been described as "quintessentially Japanese, yet also strangely oversized and villa-like, as it extends the built vocabulary of the school with its clear-cut concrete edges". According to Momoyo Kaijima, one of the architects, "We tried to obtain a fusion between space and light, in a way to create 'gap spaces', that is the leftover spaces in between the four boxes which bring light into the building".
