= Fuku Akino =

Japanese painter (1908–2001)

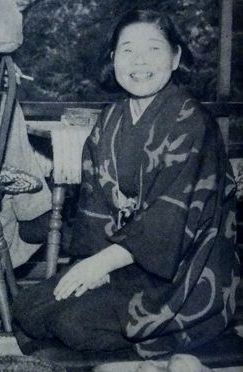
Fuku Akino

Fuku Akino (秋野 不矩, Akino Fuku, July 25, 1908 - October 11, 2001) was a Japanese painter. She was born in Futamata, Iwata-gun, Shizuoka Prefecture (currently, Nimata Town, Tenryu Ward, Hamamatsu City). She became known by her paintings of Indian themes, landscapes and peoples.

== Life and career ==
Akino got a degree in teaching from Shizuoka's Normal School (current Shizuoka University Faculty of Education) in 1926. She taught classes at an elementary school, but quit after a year. Akino then went to Kyoto to learn Japanese-style painting (Nihonga), under the guidance of Suisho Nishiyama.

In 1948, Akino left the Japan Fine Arts Exhibition and joined the Sozo Bijutsu (Creative Arts) group, together with Uemura Shoko and Fukuda Toyoshiro, seeking a renewal of Japanese art. The following year, she became an assistant professor at Kyoto City University of Arts.

When she was 53 years old, Akino was invited by India's Visva-Bharati University to be a visiting professor. Charmed by the country, she started to work on Indian themes. Akino visited India several times, painting the country's landscapes, buildings and peoples. Akino also visited Bangladesh, Nepal, Cambodia and Africa.

Akino died on 11 October 2001, in Kyoto, of a heart attack.

== Honors ==
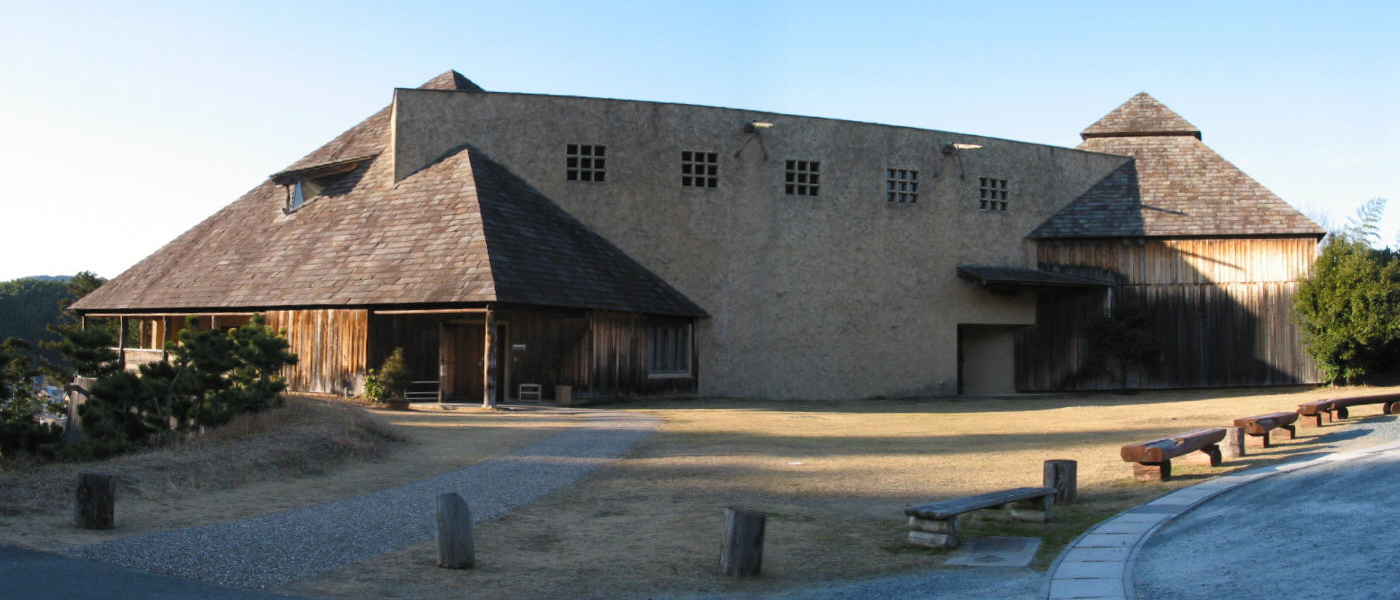
Akino Fuku Museum, in Hamamatsu, Shizuoka.

Akino was named a Person of Cultural Merit in 1991 and was awarded the Order of Culture in 1999. A museum housing her artworks was built in her hometown of Hamamatsu in 1998. The museum was designed by Japanese architect Terunobu Fujimori.
