= Atelier Bow-Wow =

Tokyo-based architecture firm

Atelier Bow-Wow is a Tokyo-based architecture firm, founded in 1992 by Yoshiharu Tsukamoto and Momoyo Kaijima. The firm is well known for its domestic and cultural architecture and its research exploring the urban conditions of micro, ad hoc architecture.

== Founders ==
Yoshiharu Tsukamoto was born in Kanagawa Prefecture in 1965. He studied architecture at Tokyo Institute of Technology, graduating from his undergraduate degree in 1987. Tsukamoto travelled to Paris to be a guest student at L’Ecole d’Architecture de Belleville (UP 8) from 1987–88 and in 1994 he completed a Doctor of Engineering program at Tokyo Institute of Technology.

In 2000, Tsukamoto became an associate professor at the Tokyo Institute of Technology and in both 2003 and 2007 he was a Kenzo Tange Visiting Associate Professor in the Department of Architecture at Harvard GSD. Also in 2007 and again in 2008 he was a visiting Associate Professor at The University of California, Los Angeles (UCLA)

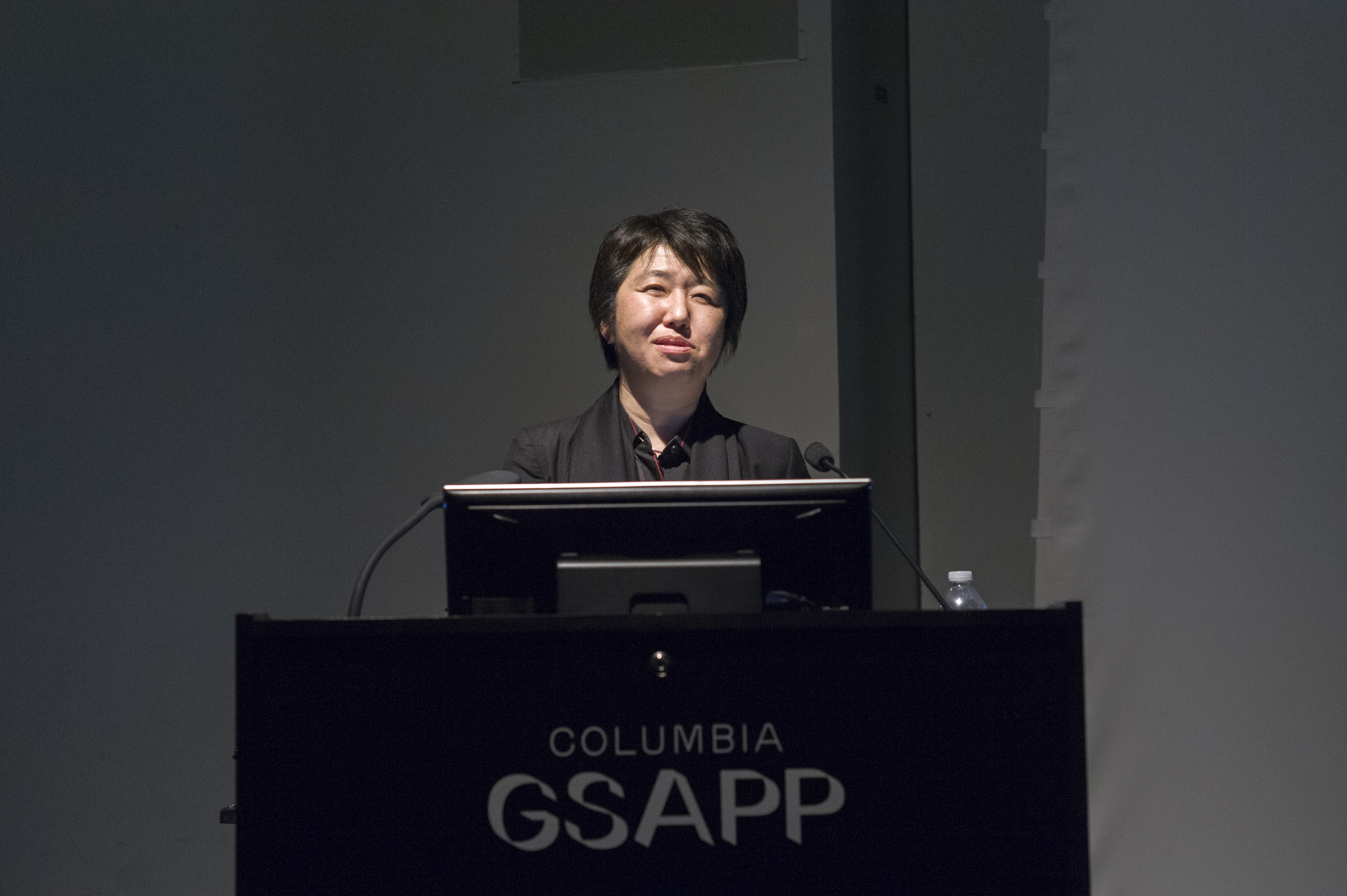
Momoyo Kaijima from Atelier Bow Wow at Columbia GSAPP at 2017

Momoyo Kaijima was born in Tokyo in 1969. She received her undergraduate degree from the Faculty of Domestic Science at Japan Women's University in 1991 and both her graduate (M.Eng.) and post-graduate degrees were from the Tokyo Institute of Technology in 1994 and 1999. She was also a guest student at Eidgenössische Technische Hochschule Zürich (ETH) from 1996-1997.

In 2000 Kaijima became an assistant professor, and in 2009 an associate professor, at the Art and Design School of the University of Tsukuba. Like Tsukamoto, in 2003 she was a visiting faculty (as a design critic) in the Department of Architecture at Harvard GSD and between 2005 and 2007 she was also a guest professor at ETH Zürich. In 2010 she was the Architect in Residence at the University of Auckland.

In the spring of 2014, Yoshiharu Tsukamoto signed on to be a member of the Guggenheim Helsinki Design Competition jury.

== Theories by Atelier Bow-Wow ==
=== Pet Architecture ===
"Pet Architecture" is a term Atelier Bow-Wow uses for the buildings that have been squeezed into left over urban spaces. Buildings with curious shapes and inventive solutions for windows, drainage, and air-conditioning often arise in these urban situation. One example of this is the Coffee Saloon Kimoto in Tokyo, a triangular structure with a capacity of four customers.

Most of those buildings are cheaply built, and therefore are not spectacular in design and they use not the forefront of technology. However we are attracted by them. It's maybe because their presence produces a relaxed atmosphere and make us feel relieved. Pets, companion animals of the people, are usually small, humorous and charming. We find what we call "pet architecture", architecture having pet like characteristics, existing in the most unexpected places within the Tokyo city limits.

Atelier Bow-Wow documented these micro buildings in detail through photographs, elevations, maps, 3D sketches, and brief descriptions in their publications “Pet Architecture Guide Book” and “Made in Tokyo."

=== Behaviorology ===
Behaviorology is the study of functional relationships between ‘behaviour’ and its many independent variables in the determining environment. Behaviorological accounts are influences and based on the current social and physical environment in which the behaviour occurs, the personal history of the behaving organism, and the behavioural capacity of the given species. It is also a clever means of integrating the ‘built’ environment across different scales; furniture, architecture, structures of civil engineering and urban planning. “It positions projects within an ecosystem of behaviours as elements which participate in spatial production.”

The behaviorologist discovers the natural laws which govern and dictate behaviour. Through this knowledge they then develop behaviour engineering technologies relevant to behaviour in many fields including architecture, education, and entertainment. It can be applied to natural elements as well as buildings (not only humans).

Architecture firm Atelier Bow-Wow is famous for its interpretation and use of the concept of behaviorology in its design work. According to founders Tsukamoto and Kaijima, behaviorology defines architectural expression through the understanding of the complex relationship between people (the inhabitants of a space), the built environment, and urban space. Bow-Wow's Behaviorology goes further than ‘form follows function’: it bases form on the behaviour of both the building and natural elements. The study of a building's articulation, inherent properties of elements such as heat, wind, light, water and the understanding of individual and common human behaviour leads to a stronger localized architecture.

=== Micro Public Space ===
Micro Public Spaces are devices proposed by Atelier Bow-Wow which create social platforms. Micro Public Space shows Atelier Bow-Wow's way of thinking about the space, i.e.social space, a concept influenced by Henri Lefebvre that discusses 'a space is produced neither by architects nor by city planners, nor by the users who live in space: space is not consumer-generated but space-generated', therefore, 'it is not people who creates space, but social spaces that use people to bring themselves into being'.

Atelier Bow-Wow creates Micro Public Spaces using the framework of an art-exhibition. In the projects on Micro Public Spaces, such as Manga Pod (2002), Furnicycle(2002) and White Limousine Yatai (2003), Atelier Bow-Wow tries to create the new behaviours of the city and people through small furniture or non-enclosed public spaces that encourage active user participation and support individual body experience and behaviour. So their projects construct situation rather than objects that they adjust 'the posture of people and their layout in a space'.

Therefore, Micro Public Space, as the term micro indicates, is an attempt to take even the smallest space or object that is officially public and to add individual layer to it as making use of the space.

=== Da-me Architecture ===
"Da-me Architecture" (no-good architecture) is a term coined by Atelier Bow Wow, to describe the buildings in Tokyo which prioritizes a "stubbornly honest" response to specific site conditions and program requirements, without insisting on architectural aesthetic and form. Hence, these tend to disregard the need to express "good taste" or to "work with nostalgia" (pre-conditioned meanings, categories or looks), resulting in a "hybrid, junky architecture" that is regarded by some critics and practitioners as "disgusting" or "shameless". However, according to Atelier Bow Wow, "Shamelessness can become useful", as these buildings intricately report of the urban condition of the city. These, in fact, "epitomize a creative new, adaptive aesthetic that can be said to be the quintessence of Tokyo."

"Da-me Architecture" represents the most cost-effective and efficient solutions requiring minimum effort, which is expected in a place like Tokyo. Constructed in the most practical manner with the possible elements on site, “Da-me” often utilizes "spatial by-products" or whatever is at hand, like under concrete engineering structures, rooftops or gaps between buildings etc. “Da-me architecture also becomes about the juxtaposition of types, resulting in "cross-categorical hybrids" which are varied, completely unrelated but interdependent. The Atelier Bow-Wow guidebook "Made in Tokyo” describes the highway departmental store as an example of such a cross-categorical hybrid, as the two elements (highways and department stores) belong in different categories, and have no relation in use, but exist in the same location because the traffic above and the shopping below share the same structure. The guidebook states: "Such an existence seems an antithesis of aesthetics, history, classification and planning, but it is interesting and refreshing as the architecture is simply a physical functional construct that has arrived at this point through a desperation in attempts to respond to the here and now and not anything else."

=== Generational Typology ===
Generational Typology (also ‘Machiya Metabolism’) is based on research into the building type known as machiya (traditional townhouses/merchant houses constructed in the Edo period), specifically in the Kanazawa area of Japan. This area is optimal for the investigation into the transformation of these building types over time as the area was spared destruction from the earthquakes and effects of war during the 20th century. The machiya chosen for this research were not necessarily those designated for comprehensive historic preservation, but were “nameless machiya” – those that may have transformed due to more humble influences.

These examinations were undertaken to further develop the concept of ‘Behaviorology’ and stems from the understanding of the existence of different “timescales” and that these must be taken into consideration when observing the behaviour of various systems; a human being's psychological behaviour could be observed in a period of one day. A society group's routines could become apparent in a week, or a community's in a year. For buildings, its behaviour may only become apparent after documenting its transformations over decades or centuries.

From the investigations into these machiya, several generational typologies are described based on the behaviour and evolution of the machiya over time by being exposed to the “pressures of modernization, from its original formula”.

=== Void Metabolism ===
Void metabolism is an urban formula which focuses on void spaces which develop between buildings when they are rebuilt. In Tokyo small houses cover the land with greenery inserted in the gaps between. This is a highly sustainable urban form which regenerates itself; with privately owned properties. It can be considered a type of metabolism, though quite different in content than the 1960s architectural thought. At that time concepts focussed on the composition of the vertical core. We can see that architects believed that the construction of the city would be carried out effectively through a concentration of power and capital. However, the regeneration of houses revolve not around a core, but a void- the gap space between buildings. This would be determined by the initiatives of individual families, rather than the accumulation of central capital.

If the urban formula of void metabolism begins with Tokyo's first developments in the 1920s, then the oldest parts are already 90 years old. With the 26-year lifespan of houses, those in the original areas have, in theory, regenerated twice over. There are differences in lifespan, so today's situation can be said to include a mixture of first, second and third generation buildings. With this we witness a variety of building behaviours, reflecting the generational differences. Houses which are produced now are a part of the fourth generation, determined by the realities of void metabolism. Atelier Bow-Wow ask: “what therefore, should a fourth generation house be?”

1. Interior spaces be inviting for those who are not family members. 2. The quasi-exterior spaces be introduced in a positive manner. 3. The gap between neighbouring buildings be redefined.

== Publications ==
=== Behaviorology ===
Through text and photographs Behaviorology covers the majority of Atelier Bow-Wow's work up to 2010 including built projects, temporary exhibitions, art installations, architectural-furniture hybrids, and their research on architecture and urbanism.

The book opens with an introductory statement by Yoshiharu Tsukamoto which gives his explanation of Atelier Bow Wow's concept of ‘behaviorology’ including their hypothesis that behavior could be central to the understanding of the links between human life, nature, and the built environment.

Behaviorology brings about an immediate shift in subjectivity, inviting many different elements together and calling into question who or what may be the main protagonist of a space. Through this ecological approach our imagination follows the principles of nature and experiences space from a variety of perspectives. When one is surrounded by and synchronized to the liveable rhythms embedded in different behaviors – there is no experience quite so delightful.

He then discusses several of the partnership's other key design theories and concludes the essay in a section titled ‘Possibilities for behaviorology’, which relates behaviorology to these theories and discusses it as an integral part of these concepts. Although their works have often been realised individually, to them this is in no way “schizophrenic; rather projects tend to contaminate, inform, and mutually develop one another”.

Following Tsukamoto's commentary, essays and a synopsis of each project are dispersed between an extensive number of large colour photographs of Atelier Bow Wow's works. Architectural historian turned architect Terunobu Fujimori's essay reflects particularly on how Atelier Bow Wow's research has informed their work, and their embodiment of the “eccentric gaze” which is discussed in relation to the architect Wajiro Kon and the Roadway Observation Society. “Their work is not an architecture of spaces, but an architecture of relationships”. Art curator Meruro Washida's essay comments on Atelier Bow Wow's success in art, while Yoshikazu Nango and Enrique Walker's essays focus on the partnership's approach to urban and architectural research.

=== Made in Tokyo ===
Made in Tokyo emerged from Atelier Bow Wow as a published text in 2001. It has also been represented in the form of catalogues, exhibitions, and even T-shirts. The bright yellow cover makes an immediate statement, echoing the impact the text has created by providing alternative methods for understanding the urban nature of Tokyo. Alternative that is, "as an antidote to the many Japanese publications dedicated to the extravagant buildings of the prosperous 'bubble' period."

"Anonymous buildings, not beautiful, and not accepted in architectural culture to date"; this text documents an ongoing investigation which began in 1991, stemming from an observation made by Tsukamoto and Kaijima of an everyday building, "a narrow spaghetti shop wrenched into the space under a baseball batting centre." Usually overlooked in nature, 70 examples of ‘da-me architecture’ or ‘no-good architecture’ are catalogued. A wide variety of typologies are listed, serving as "a survey of nameless and strange buildings of this city."

Examples include the Sewage Courts, which function as a sewage disposal plant and sporting facilities, or the Highway Department Store, an expressway and department store. These buildings can only exist in Tokyo. "We thought that although these buildings are not explained by the city of Tokyo, they do explain what Tokyo is. So, by collecting and aligning them, the nature of Tokyo’s urban space might become apparent."

Each example is explained through diagrams and photographs, the text laid out in the form of a guidebook. The logic is that "a guidebook doesn’t need a conclusion, clear beginning or order. This seems suitable for Tokyo where the scene is of never ending construction and destruction."

The text can be viewed as a guide to the theories investigated by Atelier Bow Wow, as it expresses the basis of architectural and urban investigation which spurred on and underlies their work.

=== Bow-Wow from Post Bubble City ===
Bow-Wow from Post Bubble City is a publication that documents projects both in Japan and internationally.

The book is divided into twelve chapters each titled [DEPTH], [BUILT FORM], [SITE], [SMALLNESS], [VIEW], [CONVENTIONAL ELEMENT], [COMBINED ORIENTATION], [MICRO PUBLIC SPACE], [FLUX MANAGEMENT], [GAP SPACE], [HYBRID], and [OCCUPANCY].

Kaijima and Tsukamoto introduce these theories at the beginning of each chapter in the form of a dialogue between the two architects, and the theories can subsequently be seen applied in the projects that follow in each chapter. For example, the chapter [VIEW] addresses the importance of sight lines and views of occupants, however it does not discriminate between the picturesque scenery of Mt. Fuji and that of the densely built residential districts of Tokyo.

The book also explores the issues in the housing industry brought by the bubble economy in post WWII Japan, and Kaijima in particular was concerned with “how to relate architecture to the appearance of the individual” in terms of social and architectural positionings of the individual house.

"n Japan, throughout the period of high economic growth that followed the wartime defeat, then the bubble economy and its subsequent collapse, many detached houses have been built as works of architecture, and I acknowledge their collective cultural value. Yet at the same time, systematically and compositionally they occupy a fairly Manneristic realm, and in this I feel that they exist isolated from the reality of life.

The publication documents Atelier Bow-Wow's projects using photographs, diagrams, drawings, statistics and descriptions. The text of the book is both in original Japanese and also translated into English.

=== Graphic Anatomy ===
The use of the title “Graphic Anatomy” suggests that the book is that – a series of anatomical building illustrations – and nothing more; nothing less. Atelier Bow Wow assimilate themselves to anatomists, or botanists, whose skills in producing illustrations are so intricate and in a sense almost scientific that their work could not be regarded as “artworks”, since their techniques are so restricted, and any individual strand of creativity is suppressed in the process.

Building elements - both architectural and non-architectural – are depicted in their outlines, and labelled with a precise detailed notation of material, dimension, finishes, and textures. This almost mechanical depiction of architecture allows buildings to be liberated from the conventional subjectivity of its authors, and in turn presented in the “earnestness of observation.”

A similar presentation style had been used in previous Atelier Bow Wow publications, such as “Pet Architecture” and “Made in Tokyo”, but in “Graphic Anatomy” their skills have been used to induce a new sense of spatial depth in house illustration, whilst simultaneously attempting to catalogue 24 previous house designs by Atelier Bow-Wow. The use of vertical and horizontal perspectives, together with magnified construction details allows for a new way of observing architecture not only as an object, but within that single frame consisting of many spatial compositions, between rooms and components, between interiors and their adjacent exterior environments, between actions and locations, and ultimately between humans and the spaces they inhabit.

=== Echo of Space/Space of Echo ===
Echo of Space / Space of echo is a compilation of essays and images that discuss the firm's ideologies concerning the balance between the ‘form of being’ (physical environment), and ‘form of doing’ (systems and relationships of the environment).

Individual chapters explore architectural spaces ranging in scale from urban planning to crafted objects to show “lively space where the forms of being and doing echo with each other” .”

Whimsical studies compare dog breeds to chair types (dogs and chairs, differences in expressions of hard and soft toys (animal figures)), and describe walking through stairways in train stations as a performance (transfer).

The book has a focus on the firm’s own environment of Tokyo as a ‘changing city’, but the observations and critiques made can be applied in all urban environments. The book pushes for a unity between environmental, human, and animal occupations of space. Echo of Space creates an overlying dreamlike analogy between architecture and an animal world, offering insight into architectural space from a uniquely Japanese perspective.

Echo of Space/Space of Echo was first published in 2009, 139 pages, contains colour photographs, text in Japanese with English translations by Kumiko Yamamoto.

== Projects ==
=== Jig house ===
The Jig house is a two-storey house in the area of Funabashi, Chiba Prefecture built in 2003. The client was Shin Sugawara, an architectural paint dealer and the 8th ranking Kendo master in Japan.

The brief was for a ‘dynamic, clean and individualistic’ home that incorporates traditional Japanese elements such as the Tatami mats and Shoji. Atelier Bow Wow reinterpreted the elements using contemporary architectural language such as replacing Washi-translucent, multi-purpose paper with fibreglass reinforced plastic (FRP). The FRP is repeated throughout the home in shelving, Shinto altar, bathrooms, etc. Traditional use of timber for the veranda is also replaced with industrial materials such as steel, concrete and paint in various shades. However, the overall effect of the home is still incoherent with the characteristics of traditional Japanese home, balancing architecture with its surrounding nature.

Due to the nature of the area, the site is surrounded with temporary asphalt paths and construction sites. The architects framed each window's view carefully in an attempt to avoid any ‘visual noise’. The ground level windows frame the formal garden whilst a 4 by 4-foot (1.2 m) square window in the master bedroom just misses the view of the train. The precise detailing and composition of every architectural detail provides the house with what Tsukamoto refers to as ‘rhythms to the groundless, erupting flow we call life’.

=== Nora House ===
The Nora House is located in the countryside outside the city of Sendai, 190 miles (310 km) north of Tokyo, Japan. This 2,500-square-foot (230 m^{2}) site belonged to a residential community that developed in the 1960s when the area was mostly farmland. Additionally the site is across the street from the wife's childhood home.

It was designed by Atelier Bow-Wow in collaboration with the Tokyo Institute of Technology, in 2006. The dwelling was for a couple with a young child who had just moved back from the city. As part of the Atelier's ideology, to maximise the potential of small spaces, the Architects had to step away from working vertically and start to develop the design horizontally.

“In Tokyo, we have done a lot of one-room living, but in a more vertical way,” explains Tsukamoto. “Here, we developed the idea horizontally.”

The result was a single storey house which spreads out over nine different levels divided only by short stairs and three freestanding partitions. Since the architects decided to integrate features of the traditional minka farmhouses, they were able to create a new typology for the mixed agricultural and urban land that is found at the fringes of Japanese cities. Additionally by using this traditional building style the architects were able to blend this expressive and open-to-the-street house with the adjacent pitched roof residences covered with metal siding or stucco. The minka style shows in the high peaked roof that serves as a substitute of a chimney, covered porch, the large fluid interior space and timber construction. In addition the unusual roof was to accommodate for the extensive precipitation experienced in many parts of Japan. Thus the steeply peaked roof allowed the rain and snow to fall straight off it, preventing water from getting into the home

The Nora House is part of the Pet Architecture, a term created by Yoshiharu Tsukamoto and Momoyo Kaijima, the founder Of Atelier Bow-Wow. It is a term for buildings that have been squeezed into left-over urban spaces. The name "Pet architecture" refers to houses which have pet-like characteristics, such as being small, humorous, charming, rebellious, unexpected and adapt themselves to their environments. As pet architecture does not use the forefront technology and does not make the appearance its first consideration, it is a great tool for users to customise their building on a low budget. Since it is defined by using curious shapes and inventive solutions for drainage, windows and air conditioning, they highlight their unique location, produce a relaxed atmosphere and therefore help to relieve the occupant.

=== Hanamidori ===
The Hanamidori Cultural Center is a multipurpose building built at Showa Memorial Park at Tachikawa, Tokyo in 2005 just 10 minutes of walking distance from the Tachikawa rail station. It occupies a total floor area of 6,031.64 m2 with the design developed by principal architects Masakazu Suzuki and Momoyo Kaijima in cooperation with Atelier Bow-wow and centralises the experience of the Green Culture Zone and the functions for exchanging and providing information.

"The basic concept was for a “growing architecture”, in response to the developing activities of green culture, and for 'parkitecture' - architecture integrating with landscape, in which interior and exterior are connected. Our intention was for a space as comfortable as in the shade of a tree that would provide support for park activities. "

The building includes exhibition space, workshops, cafe and library all built within the 15 cylinders that supporting an undulating roof covered by green. The spaces between the cylinders are arranged with furniture that can change depending on function and form with a glazed external skin allowing for a visual connection with the exterior. The facade can be opened up in good weather providing an unhindered access to the exterior.

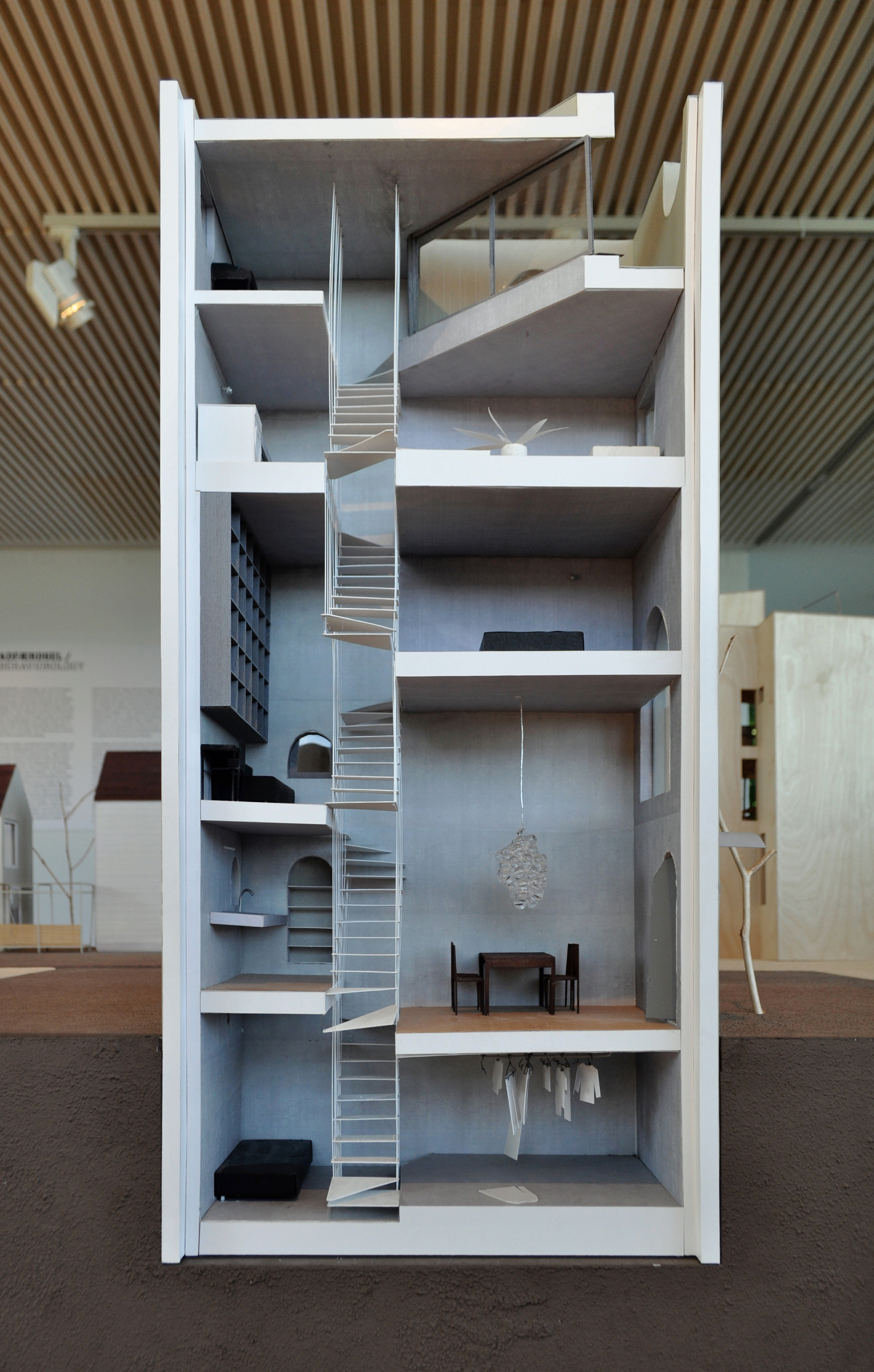
Atelier bow-wow (Yoshiharu Tsukamoto and Momoyo Kaijima), 'House Tower' section model, 2006, photo from exhibition in 2011 Living at the Louisiana Museum of Copenhagen.

=== House Tower ===
Located in Shinagawa-ku district of Tokyo, the House Tower, Situated on a constrained 42-square-meter site, the building is set back from the street and stands over 11 meters tall, occupying a building area (footprint) of 18.5 square meters. It is characterized by its prominent height relative to the surrounding low-rise structures and its irregularly arranged opening.

Due to the site constraints, the house breaks from the conventional architecture planning, and is articulated as a single volume. The different space of a common house is not defined by walls but by 10 small staggering levels, each with its own purpose and all connected by a floating “step-plate hung on steel rods” staircase; thus the primary functions of this house are allocated to these ‘landings’. The staircase also divides the house lengthwise into two areas. The furniture and fixtures are carefully aligned to the areas at the rear, leaving the other side “clear, flexible and without built-in installations.”

Despite the apparent ‘individuality’ of the building, the oversized front window “resonates with the scale of the cityscape outside”, while having a conversation with an adjacent neighbour's arched roof.

=== Ako House ===
Ako House is located in a dense residential district zone, Setagaya, Tokyo. It is a three-storey residential building and with total site area of 51.26m2. It took 7 months to design the house with 5 months of construction. The structure/ construction method of the house is wooden.

Ako house is an example of a building ‘behaviour’ in increasingly fragmented high-density residential districts. Due to the constrained nature of the site area, the volume of the house had to expand vertically thus creating a strong vertical circulation. Atelier bow-wow's design objective for this house was “to ensure the maximum capacity that can be placed on the site, while discovering new behaviours within density and within a state of vertical expansion. The location of the site is a corner lot with a sliced off corner. Reflecting this particular characteristic of the site into its design, the facade of the house is divided into five segments of equal length with slightly shifted angles. Each wall has few windows placed to allow views connecting out to the nearby trees and sloping street.

The interior of the house has a clear composition with the staircase placed at the centre of the house. Each level of the floors is strongly distinguished by its own characteristic. However the downside of this predominant the staircase is that it sometimes creates predominant visual distraction. Atelier bow-wow attempted to solve this problem by obscuring the stair as much as possible. “We created slit-levels to lower the vertical intervals between floors and to shorten each stairway.”

=== Black Dog House ===
Built in 2004 in Karuizawa-cho, Nagan, the Black Dog House, is a domestic residence which can be seen as fairly conventional as compared to some of their other projects. However, like many of their other works, the Black Dog House is an intriguing example of space craftsmanship. Bow-Wow explore the subtle changes in surface – the morphing of elements and the individual piecing together of a house that gives it expression.

Just as in the city, Bow-Wow carefully examined the surrounding environs and interpreted them to design a customised building. Visual contact with nature is one of the dictating elements of the house. The house is very open planned, and allows for uninterrupted views right through into the forest beyond.

The House comprises a sequence of subdivided rooms all of equal size: a pet space, bedroom, guest room, kitchen, bathroom and garage. The inner wall is a continuous line which is folded to create spaces on either side, while a corridor cuts through various rooms. Each room is given a different visual condition.

The roof's low extrusion divides the elevation into upper and lower sections, although the interior spaces have quite a high ceiling height (max 5.1m). The young artist Tabaimo painted murals all over the walls. The ceiling is painted silver so as to bounce light around.

=== House & Atelier Bow Wow ===
Atelier Bow-Wow’s construction of their domestic residence and office in Shinjuku-ku, Tokyo saw the composition of permeable interior spaces, where public and intimate places co-mingle. Located on a flag shaped site the house establishes a responsive dialogue with its enclosing neighbours, expressing Atelier Bow-Wow’s urban idioms. Surrounded by buildings and connected by a narrow strip of land to the road House and Atelier Bow-Wow ‘pushes the capacity of the micro plot’ investing in ‘the broader order of the urban environment.’ Sensitivity to available gap spaces saw placement of openings towards adjacent houses, positioning ‘interior space as a part of its surroundings: a room coexisting with its next-door neighbour’s exterior wall.’ Functioning as a semi-public building, Bow-Wow sought to ease the divide between living and work, ‘transposing activities.’ ‘Avoidance of heavy partition walls softens even further the distinction between surroundings and interior and, within this between house and office.’ Entered through a narrow passageway occupants emerge within a ‘four-storey interior that is effectively a single volume, with the four principal floor decks arranged on the half level, and generous interstitial landings sitting between.’ Occupants first encounter the atelier space which is spread over the upper and lower ground levels. Atelier Bow-Wow’s articulation of ascent within the structure sees the nature of spaces change. As occupants rise through the building walls converge to constrict upper levels, shifting the internal scale of the building to a domestic sense suited for living. External views also characterise levels directing orientation of space.

Furthermore, Atelier Bow-Wow account for the practical issues of climate control in a space that is occupied twenty-four hours per day; positioning a radiant heater/cooler vertically through the building, diminishing ‘boundaries between territories and establishing in their stead more nuanced relationships.’

‘We also dug a well and use the water for radiant cooling and heating. The well water pumped up to the roof streams down on surface of the external wall, cooling the wall by vaporization in the summer. The external wall is covered with granule-faced asphalt to hold the water. It is fun to think of the building as a massive rock sweating, with a dragon like internal water vein, which can be glimpsed between the houses.’

=== Ani House, 1998 ===
Located in the middle of suburbia and an hour’s train ride from Tokyo, Atelier Bow-Wow’s Ani House is set on a small section of land only 10m by 11m in size. A key idea of the Ani House was first to establish a distance from its surrounding boundaries and environment, and then “remake relationships in every direction”. Yoshiharu Tsukamoto and Momoyo Kaijima have resisted the conventional methods of covering as much of the small site as possible with the building, and instead, the small footprint of the three-storey structure is placed in the centre. The House is set at least 2.5m away from its boundaries and neighbours. This allows large openings to be made freely in each elevation of the building without compromising the House's privacy.

The interior levels of Ani House are single-room spaces without any partitioning, with the kitchen and bathroom protruding from the main volume. The House is set half a level into the ground, thus offsetting lines of sight between the street and the building's interior, so an open yet private space is achieved inside. The use of a fence, which can be constricting around a small site, has been eliminated to open the land to the street.

Windows in the House's elevations combined upper and lower floor openings to create large openings in contrast to the building's small volume. The windows are not aligned with interior floor levels, and their sizes obscure the scale and separation of the internal spaces behind the building's faces.

Ani House uses the existing surrounding environment to examine its mutual relationship with architecture, and develops a kind of open communication with the House, its occupant, and its town.

=== Gae House ===
2001-2003

The unconventional “Gae House”, set in Setagaya Tokyo, is amongst homes that line up like hedgerows that attest to the division of properties from land inheritance and the remnants of garden fences that once surrounded the whole block. Gae House embraces the intent of the surrounding homes with the use of the largest possible roof formed according to sun and site restrictions, while the walls are set back from the boundaries. The resulting gap between these elements integrates the surrounding environment with the house.

"This misalignment not only provides a roof to the parking space but introduces the hedge sequence to the boundaries with the neighbours, embodying the environment's intention expressed in the presence of live fences."

The house is organised with the bedroom and workplace placed underground, the living room and kitchen placed under the roof while entrance is on the second floor. The second floor with a horizontal opening, and stark white walls allows light to enter, creating images of and emulating the outside environment. This horizontal 'ribbon' window now becomes a formalized device for engagement of light inside and outside of the house, as well as creating a visual connection to be made with the exterior and allowing ample natural lighting to come into the attic area. This sense of envelopment is termed 'granular space'.

The inseparable character of the house from its mode of existence upon its site becomes an "organic architectural experience"; architecture that explores the relationships between the inhabitant, immediate surroundings and wider urban context.

=== Mini House ===
Mini House is located in Nerima-ku, Tokyo, a dense residential suburb, on a small site of 77sqm. The house covers only 41sqm of the site but has a total floor area of 90sqm over two and a half floors.

The design draws on Atelier Bow-Wow's theories of Void Metabolism and The Fourth-Generation House which puts an emphasis on the form and nature of the spaces between buildings as well as their internal qualities. Atelier Bow-Wow sees the Fourth-Generation House as being the product of three important conditions.

“…that the interior space be inviting for those who are not members of the family; that quasi-exterior spaces be introduced in a positive manner, coaxing inhabitants out of their homes; and that the gap spaces between neighbouring buildings be redefined.’’

Mini house sits on a small site with a 4m wide road to the east, a private path to the south and an open field to the west which is to become a ring road. The house sits with its main volume in the centre of the site with volumes projecting from each side mediating the house's relationship to its surroundings. For example, on the east façade facing the road the projecting volume sits above the ground creating a space to park a car underneath and stairs running along the southern edge allow access. Windows are located so as to open onto the small voids articulated by the form allowing natural light regardless of future development on surrounding sites.

Other Projects:

- Four Boxes Gallery - 2009 - Krabbesholm, Denmark
- Ikushima Library – 2008 – Tokyo, Japan
- Sway House – 2008 – Tokyo, Japan
- Towada Art Center – 2005 – Aomori, Japan
- Shallow House – 2002 – Tokyo, Japan
- Kawanishi Camping Cottage B – 2000 – Niigata Prefecture, Japan
