= Nora House =

The Nora House is located in the countryside outside the city of Sendai, 190 miles (310 km) north of Tokyo, Japan. This 2,500-square-foot (230 m^{2}) site belonged to a residential community that developed in the 1960s when the area was mostly farmland. Additionally the site is across the street from the wife's childhood home.

== Description ==
It was designed by Atelier Bow-Wow in collaboration with the Tokyo Institute of Technology for a couple with a young child who had just moved back from the city. As part of the Atelier's ideology, to maximise the potential of small spaces, the architects had to step away from working vertically and start to develop the design horizontally.

"In Tokyo, we have done a lot of one-room living, but in a more vertical way," explains Tsukamoto. "Here, we developed the idea horizontally."

The result was a single storey house which spreads out over nine different levels divided only by short stairs and three freestanding partitions. Since the architects decided to integrate features of the traditional minka farmhouses, they were able to create a new typology for the mixed agricultural and urban land that is found at the fringes of Japanese cities. Additionally by using this traditional building style the architects were able to blend this expressive and open-to-the-street house with the adjacent pitched roof residences covered with metal siding or stucco. The minka style shows in the high peaked roof that serves as a substitute of a chimney, covered porch, the large fluid interior space and timber construction. In addition the unusual roof was to accommodate for the extensive precipitation experienced in many parts of Japan. Thus the steeply peaked roof allowed the rain and snow to fall straight off it, preventing water from getting into the home.

== Pet Architecture ==
The Nora House is part of the Pet Architecture, a term created by Yoshiharu Tsukamoto and Momoyo Kaijima, the founder Of Atelier Bow-Wow. It is a term for buildings that have been squeezed into left-over urban spaces. The name "Pet architecture" refers to houses which have pet-like characteristics, such as being small, humorous, charming, rebellious, unexpected and adapt themselves to their environments.

Pet architecture is defined by using curious shapes and inventive solutions for drainage, windows and air conditioning, they highlight their unique location, produce a relaxed atmosphere and therefore help to relieve the occupant.
