= Terunobu Fujimori =

Japanese architect and architectural historian

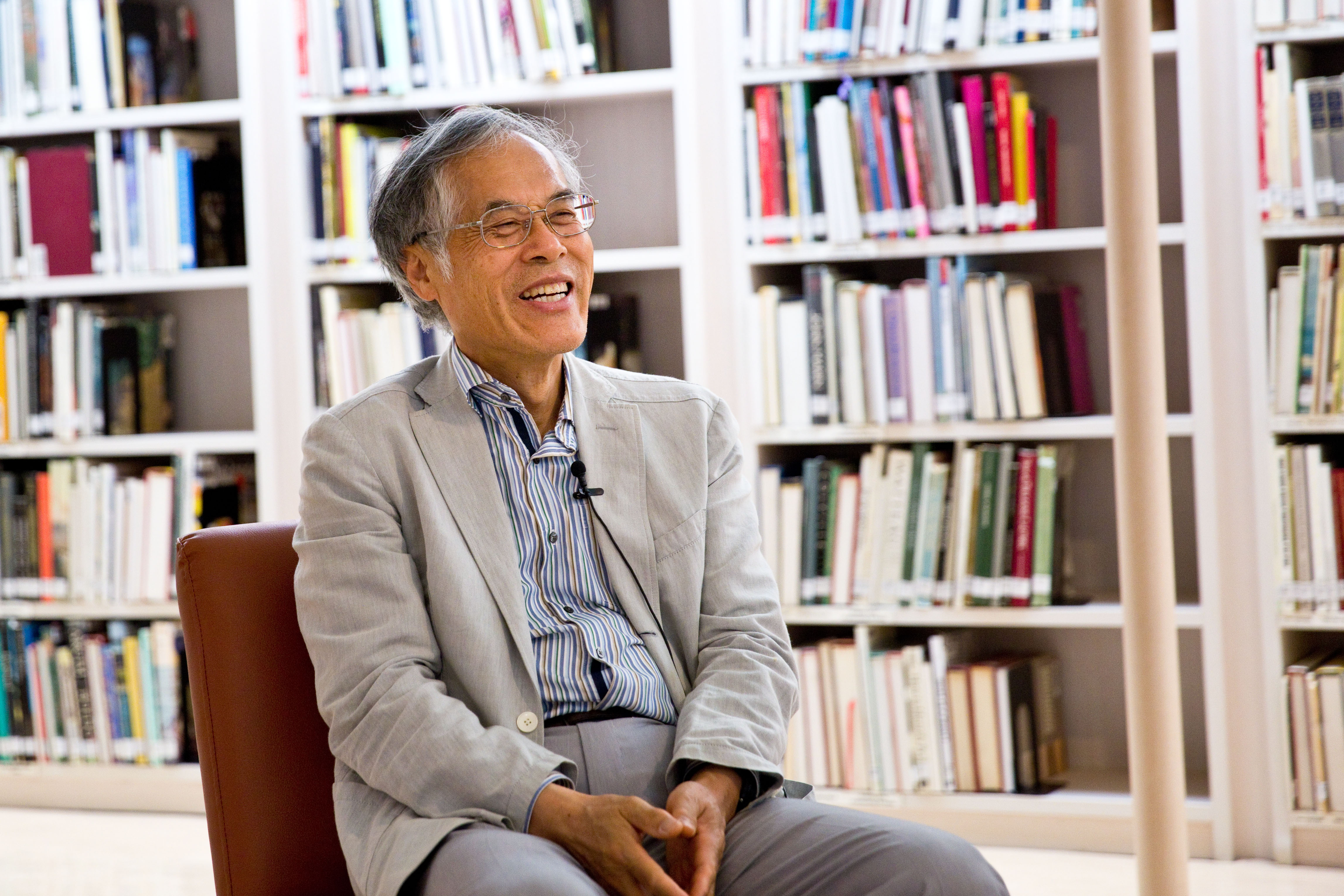
- Fujimori in 2014
- Born: November 21, 1946 (age 79); Miyakawa-mura, Suwa, Nagano Japan
- Education: Tōhoku University; University of Tokyo
- Occupation: Architect
- Awards: Japan Grand Art Prix, Architectural Institute of Japan Prix for the Student Dormitory of Kumamoto Agricultural College
- Practice: Terunobu Fujimori
- Buildings: Takasugi-an Tea House, Lamune Onsen

Terunobu Fujimori (藤森 照信, Fujimori Terunobu; November 21, 1946) is a Japanese architect and architectural historian.

During the 1970s and 1980s he made studies of the city about early Western buildings and unusual occurrences, and did not turn to architecture until he was in his forties. His work is considered by many to be eccentric but is characterised by his use of natural materials.

Although he is well known in Japan as a cultural commentator he was not widely known in the West until he represented Japan at the 2006 Venice Biennale.

== Career ==
Fujimori was born in Miyakawa-mura (part of modern-day Chino City) in Nagano Prefecture, Japan. He studied at Tōhoku University before entering graduate school at the University of Tokyo. He is currently a professor at the University of Tokyo's Institute of Industrial Science.

Whilst writing his thesis in the 1970s Fujimori formed the Architecture Detectives. In this group he and his colleagues searched the city to find and photograph early Western-style buildings. Twelve years of work on this subject resulted in the publication of the book Adventures of an Architectural Detective: Tokyo (1986). In 1986 Fujimori formed the Roadway Observation Society with Genpei Akasegawa, Shinbo Minami, Joji Hayashi, Tetsuo Matsuda. The group records unusual but naturally occurring patterns in the city, for example the pattern left by a tree on a concrete wall or a rubbish bin that has been bent over to form a seat. Their studies have been compared to Venturi and Scott-Brown's Learning from Las Vegas.

In 1991, Fujimori began to practice architecture with his first work, the Jinchōkan Moriya Historical Museum (神長官守矢史料館 Jinchōkan Moriya Shiryōkan) in Chino, Nagano. Architectural influences for his work include Le Corbusier, Claude Nicolas Ledoux, Takamasa Yoshizaka, the Ise Shrine and Callanish Standing Stones. His architecture is characterised by eccentricity and humour, experimental use of natural materials and the subversion of traditional techniques. Although the Jinchōkan Moriya Historical Museum has been criticised for merely wrapping a concrete structure in natural materials, it was praised by architect Kengo Kuma as "generating fond feelings of familiarity in people who had never seen it before".

Well known in Japan as an author, cultural commentator and TV host he was relatively unknown in the West until he represented Japan in the 2006 Venice Biennale. His display in the Japanese pavilion showed houses sprouting leeks and dandelions. As the theme of the Biennale was the "city" Fujimori included a woven rice twine hut housing a slide presentation of the work of ROJO. In 2010 he contributed the Beetle's House to one of seven designs for the V&A's "1:1 Architects Build Small Spaces" exhibition.

His work with ROJO has left an impression on younger architects like Yoshiharu Tsukamoto and Momoyo Kajima of Atelier Bow-Wow. Like Fujimori they surveyed the city for "no-good" architecture and published their findings in the book Made in Tokyo.

In 2018 he served as advisor of exhibition Japan in Architecture: Genealogies of Its Transformations curated by Director of Mori Art Museum Fumio Nanjo

== Takasugi-an Tea House (2003–2004) ==
Situated in Chino in Nagano Prefecture, the Takasugi-an Tea House is a four and a half tatami mat tea house supported six metres above the ground on two load-bearing trees (the name literally means "too high tea house"). Rather than using the traditional method of entering a tea house by stooping low, the visitor climbs a ladder to the top. Fujimori played with the traditional elements of a tea house in a modern way. For example, the picture scroll (kakejiku) that normally gives a clue about the time of year is replaced with a large window that frames a view to the town where Fujimori grew up. It is supported on two chestnut trees that were cut and moved to the site from a nearby mountain.

== Lamune Onsen (2004–2005) ==
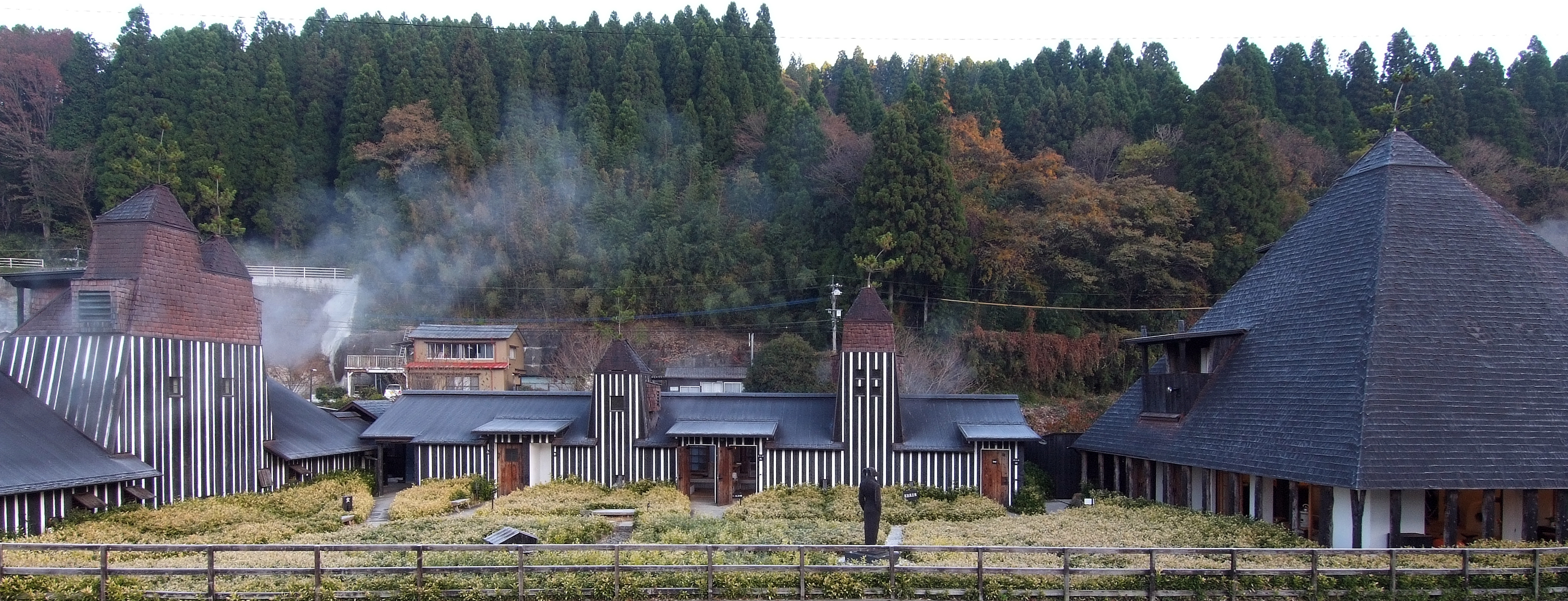
Lamune Onsen

Lamune Onsen is situated in Takeda in Ōita Prefecture. Lamune is the name of a popular fizzy drink that resembles the warm carbonated water that is characteristic of the area. The onsen is owned by the owner of a nearby traditional inn and is used by guests and members of the public alike. The façade is composed of alternate vertical bands of charred yakisugi cedar and white mortar. Its many towers act as exhausts for letting out steam and are roofed with hand-rolled copper sheets. The apex of each tower is planted with a live pine tree. The waiting room has furniture carved from burnt cedar and one wall in the men's section has mother-of-pearl shells pressed into it.

== Nemunoki Museum of Art (2004–2006) ==
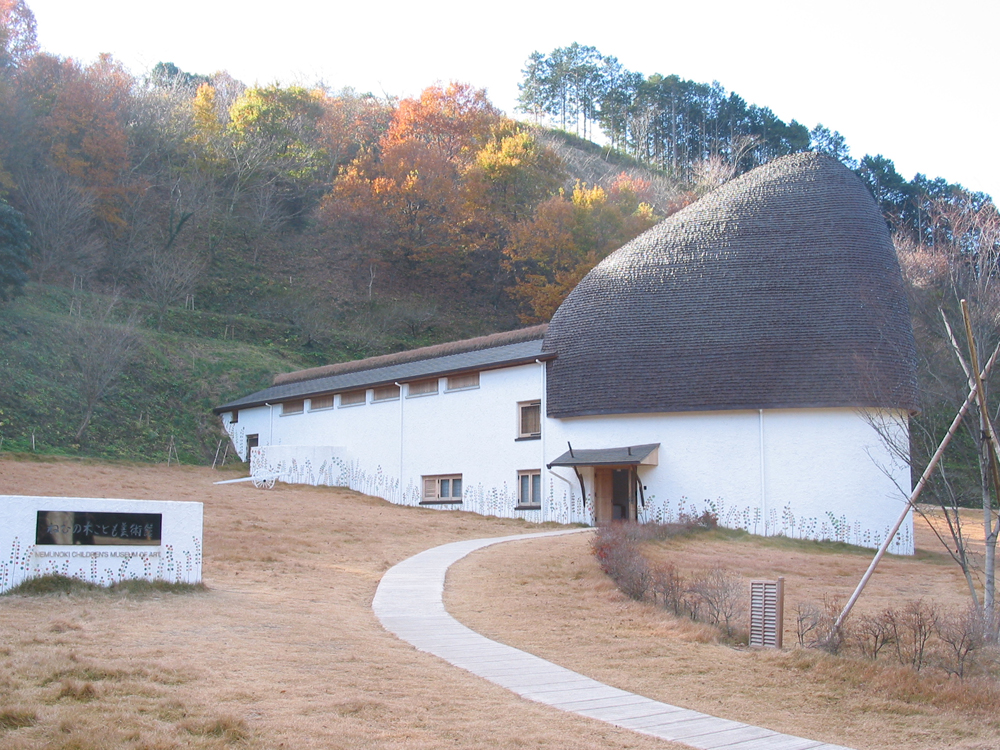
"Acorn" at Nemu no Ki Children's Museum

The Nemunoki Museum of Art is situated in Kakegawa in Shizuoka Prefecture. It was designed to house works of art by physically disabled children from an institute formed by the Japanese singer and actress Mariko Miyagi in 1967. Jutting out of the hillside, Fujimori compares its design to a "hairy mammoth". The hand-rolled copper roof is connected to the hill by a line of living grass along the ridge. The route through the museum is choreographed to take the visitor from the reception into a landscaped garden before re-entering the museum through a small door at the back. This route is designed to offer an interlude for purification and contemplation from everyday life before viewing the works of art. The simple white interior is punctuated with a lattice-like screen above the main gallery that is reminiscent of the mammoth's spine.

== Awards ==
- Mainichi Publication Culture Award (for Meiji Plans for Tōkyō)
- Suntory Prize for Social Science and Humanities (for Adventures of an Architectural Detective: Tokyo)
- Japan Grand Art Prix for the Nira (Leek) house
- Architectural Institute of Japan Prix for the Student Dormitory of Kumamoto Agricultural College (2001)
- Person of Cultural Merit (2026)

== Selected projects ==
- Jinchōkan Moriya Historical Museum (1991), Chino, Nagano
- Dandelion House (1995), Kokubunji, Tokyo
- Nira House (Leek House) (1997), Machida, Tokyo
- Fuku Akino Art Museum (1998), Hamamatsu City, Shizuoka Prefecture
- Takasugi-an Tea House, (2004), Chino, Nagano
- Chocolate House, (2009), Kokubunji, Tokyo
- Roof House (2009), Shiga Prefecture
- Beetle’s House (2010), 1:1 – Architects Build Small Spaces, Daylit Gallery, V&A, London
