= Krabbesholm Højskole =

Danish arts college

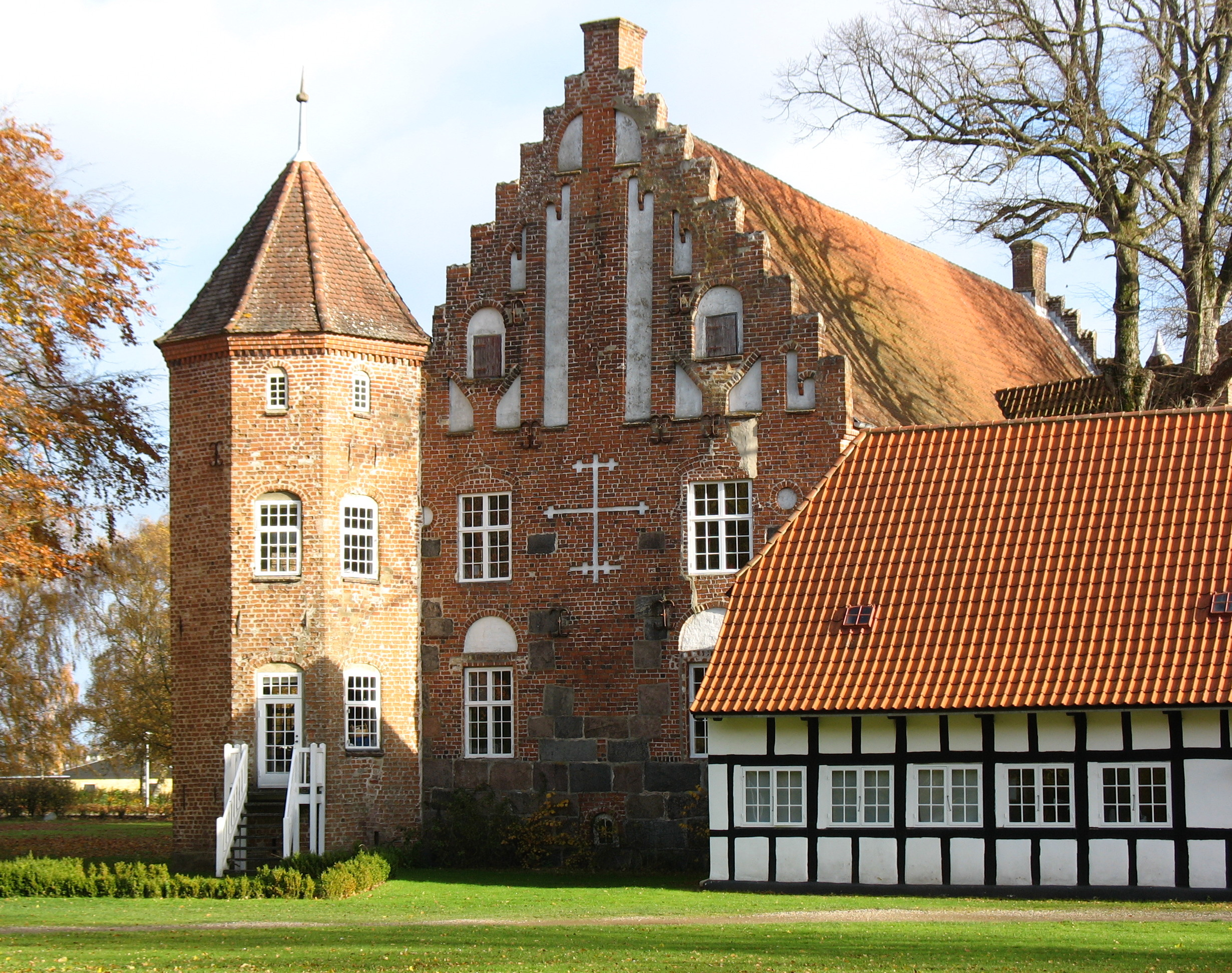
Krabbesholm seen from the southwest

Krabbesholm Højskole is a folk high school founded in 1885, located in Skive, Denmark that caters to students from several nations. The school teaches five main subjects: arts, architecture, graphic design, product design, and photography. The school is recognized as having high academic standards and a creative environment.

The school is located in the Krabbesholm manor, which dates from 1565. The manor is composed of several farms that were inherited by Magdelene Banner, who then gave it to her husband Ivar Crabbe, after whom the farm is named.

The school is home to the Four Boxes Gallery, designed by Japanese architects Atelier Bow-Wow, a three-storey building conceived as four stacked boxes used to exhibit work by both students of the Krabbesholm Højskole and invited artists.
