= Momoyo Kaijima =

Japanese architect

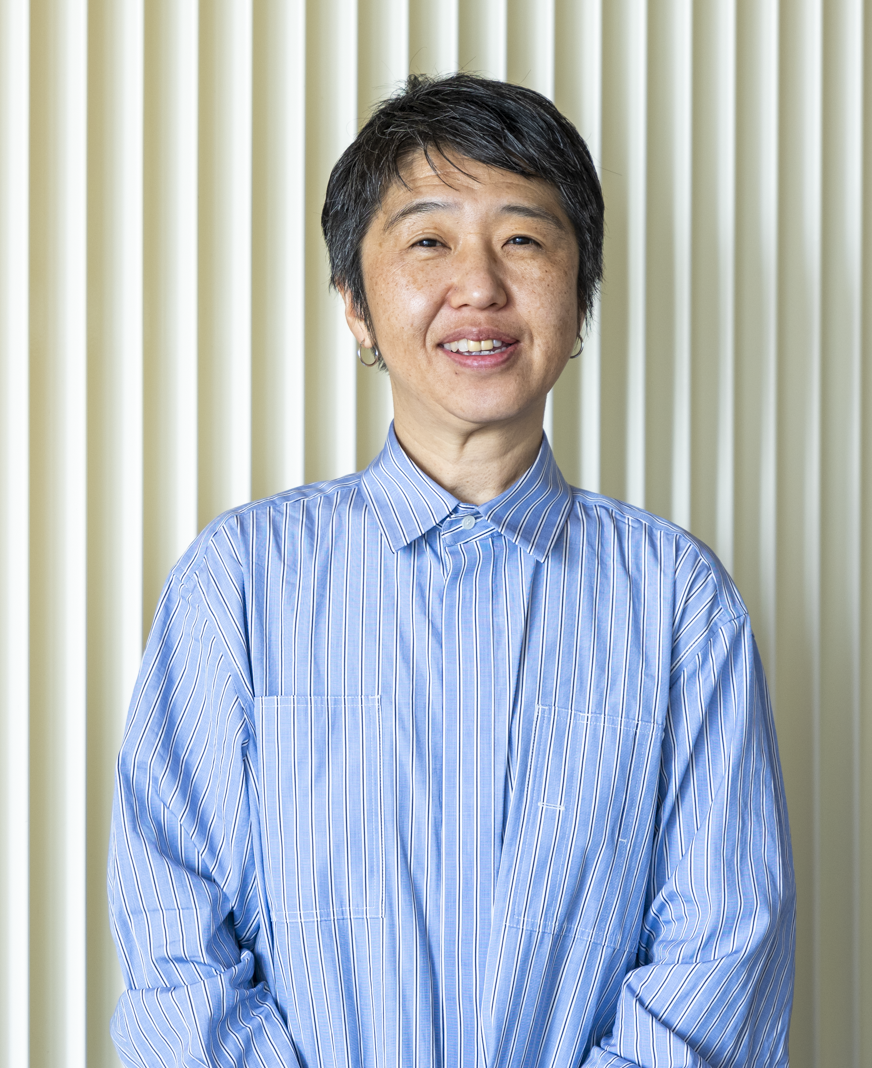
- Momoyo Kaijima in 2023
- Born: 1969 (age 56–57); Yotsuya, Shinjuku-ku, Tokyo, Japan
- Education: Japan Women’s University, Tokyo Institute of Technology
- Occupation: Architect
- Awards: International Fellowship by RIBA, Wolf Prize Laureate for Architecture

Momoyo Kaijima (Kajima, Momoya; born 1969) is a Japanese architect known for her work at Atelier Bow-wow, a studio that was founded by herself and Yoshiharu Tsukamoto. Her work has focused mainly on urban residential buildings in Japan. In 2021, was appointed as a Full Professor of Affective Architectures in the Department of Architecture at ETH Zurich.

== Early life and education ==
Kaijima was born in Tokyo in 1969 and was interested in houses from a young age. Kaijima was not influenced by anything in particular, however she had many opportunities to visit different houses.

In 1991 she graduated from the Japan Women's University in the faculty of Domestic science. Kaijima received her post graduate degree from the Tokyo Institute of Technology in 1994 with an engineering degree and continued on to get a graduate and postgraduate degree from the same institution. Kaijima went on to lecture and work at many universities across the world; Harvard, Royal Danish Academy of Fine Arts, Rice University, Delft University of Technology, Columbia, and E.T.H.Z. She has been an assistant professor at the University of Tsukuba since 2000 where she conducts research.

== Career ==
Kaijima started working with Yoshiharu Tsukamoto on competitions during their school career, and due to their successes, decided to create an Architectural studio together called Atelier Bow-Wow. Much of Atelier Bow-Wow’s work is centered on residential architecture, specifically in urban areas. These projects have often focused on utilizing the minimal space in urban centers in Kaijima’s home country of Japan. Kaijima believes that design needs to be “for our enjoyment, for our pleasure.”.

Kaijima focuses in her practice as well as her own research on humanist architecture. Some of her important projects include the Mado Building (2006), the House in Shinjuku (2005), the Tower of Winds (1986) and the Sendai Mediatheque (2001).

Kaijima also in conjunction with Tsukamoto have authored multiple books Including Pet Architecture (2002), Graphic Anatomy (2007) and The Architecture of Atelier Bow-Wow: Behaviorology (2010), ), a study that combines behaviors to produce spatial idea. Through this process, Atelier Bow-Wow seeks for a close understanding of the relationship between inhabitants, objects, rooms and the built environment, which informs their domestic spaces. Pet Architecture focuses on the small interstitial buildings that are common around Tokyo, mirroring her work at Atelier Bow-Wow. In Behaviorology, Kaijima and Tsukamoto look at small homes, and portable projects.

Kaijima has worked on over 150 architectural projects during her career.

== List of published works ==
- Made in Tokyo - 2001
- Pet Architecture - 2007
- The Architectures of Atelier Bow-Wow - 2010
- Commonalities of Architecture—2016

== List of selected works ==
- 1992 - Kiosk in Ruralscape
- 1994 - Articulatiors House
- 1996 - Eight & Half Daikan-yama
- 1998 - ANI House
- 1998 - Kusasenri Toilet
- 1998 - Mini House
- 1999 - Kawanishi Camping Cottage B
- 2000 - Moth House
- 2000 - Eight & Half Atelier
- 2001 - House Saiko
- 2002 - Das House
- 2002 - Kobe Piazza Italia
- 2005 - Hanamidori
- 2006 - Nora House
- 2008 - Sway House
- 2008 - Bokutei
- 2010 - Tower Machiya
- 2014 - Roji Machiya
- 2016 - Muji Books Ebisu
- 2017 - Periscope House
- 2021 - Home Base
- 2021 - HaHa House
- 2023 - Chestnut Tree Library

== Honors and recognition ==
- Riba International Fellowship in 2012
- Curated the Japan Pavilion at the Venice Biennale in 2018
- RIBA Prize 2021
- Presidents Medal and Award for Research 2021
- Wolf Prize in Architecture 2022
