= Ernst Immanuel Cohen Brandes =

Danish journalist and economist

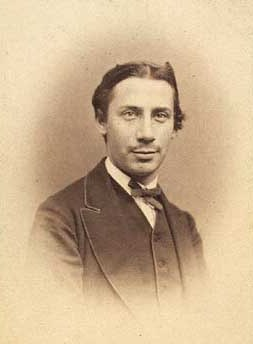
Ernst Immanuel Cohen Brandes

Ernst Immanuel Cohen Brandes (1 February 1844 – 6 August 1892) was a Danish economist, writer, and newspaper editor. He is best known for editing the Kjøbenhavns Børs-Tidende, which published articles written by leading Danish men of letters, including future Nobel Prize winner Henrik Pontoppidan, during a period later hailed as the Modern Breakthrough in Danish literature.

Outraged by his politicized blasphemy conviction for an article anonymously written by Pontoppidan for the Kjøbenhavns Børs-Tidende in 1889, Brandes committed suicide in 1892.

== Biography ==
Ernst Brandes was born to a Danish Jewish family in Copenhagen on 1 February 1844, two years after his elder brother Georg Brandes and three years before the youngest, Edvard.

Trained as an economist, Brandes focused much of his time on economic and social questions. In his 1885 Samfundssporgsmaal, he attacked the population theories of Thomas Malthus and the theory of value advanced by David Ricardo. Though prominent as a social liberal, Brandes reserved part of Samfundssporgsmaal for a critique of the Marxist movement.

Brandes came to write for the Politiken, which Edvard had helped to found in 1884, before editing his own newspaper, the Kjøbenhavns Børs-Tidende, in 1889 – an idiosyncratic undertaking meant to combine stock price lists and radical literature. Successful in his efforts to attract a wide range of talented writers, Brandes published the literary efforts and social commentary of such authors as Johannes Jørgensen, Sophus Claussen, and Viggo Stuckenberg. Having met Henrik Pontoppidan through Edvard, Brandes encouraged the outstanding Danish writer to join. Pontoppidan, who later recalled Brandes saying that Brandes' idea for the Kjøbenhavns Børs-Tidende was to create a modern, entertaining opposition paper capable of challenging the established conservative press in the Danish capital, agreed to collaborate and joined the Børs-Tidende on 30 July 1889. His ideas were anonymously published in a regular column written under the pseudonym "Urbanus".

Brandes' 1889 publication of "Messias" and the 1890 publication "Den gamle Adam" – two pieces penned by Pontoppidan under his pseudonym – triggered a scandalous reaction. "Den gamle Adam" was a light-hearted version of the Biblical story of Adam and Eve inspired by an old German folk retelling; "Messias" was Pontoppidan's review of a book by Viggo Stuckenberg.

Indicted on blasphemy charges for both pieces in December 1890, Brandes was made to answer for each as distinct offenses against the blasphemy laws before a jury trial. He was acquitted for "Den gamle Adam" but ordered to serve two months for the publication of the "Messias" article. Pontoppidan, who was not charged, admitted he was the author of the two articles when the matter was brought to trial, but faced no penalty despite his admission and his offer to claim legal responsibility in Brandes' place. The defense argued that Brandes was being singled out as a prominent Brandes brother and a person of Jewish background.

The controversial case finally made its way to the Danish Supreme Court, which again acquitted Brandes for the Adam article but upheld the conviction for "Messias" while softening the earlier sentence of two months' imprisonment to a fine of 300 kroner in December 1891.

Despondent for months afterward, he committed suicide by taking poison in Copenhagen on 6 August 1892.
