= H. C. Ørsteds Vej =

Street in Frederiksberg Municipality, Denmark

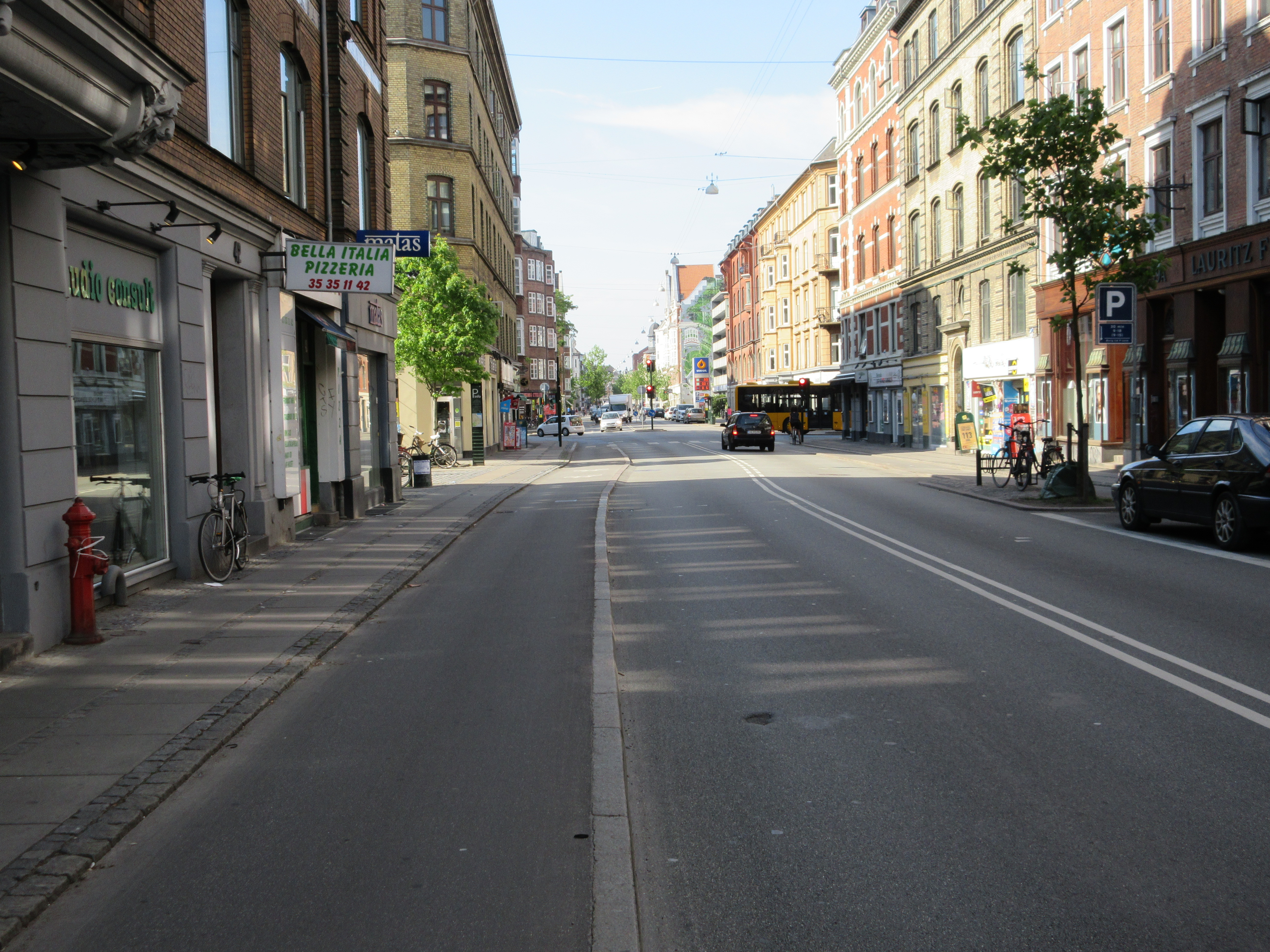
- Interactive map of H. C. Ørsteds Vej
- Length: 1,110 m (3,640 ft)
- Location: Copenhagen, Denmark
- Quarter: Frederiksberg
- Postal code: 1879
- Nearest metro station: Forum, Vesterport
- Coordinates: 55°40′50.88″N 12°32′56.04″E
- South end: Gammel Kongevej
- Major junctions: Rosenørns Allé
- North end: Åboulevard

H. C. Ørsteds Vej is a street in the Frederiksberg district of Copenhagen, Denmark. It runs from Gammel Kongevej in the south to Åboulevard on the border with Nørrebro in the north, linking Alhambravej in the south with Griffenfeldsgade in the north.

== History ==
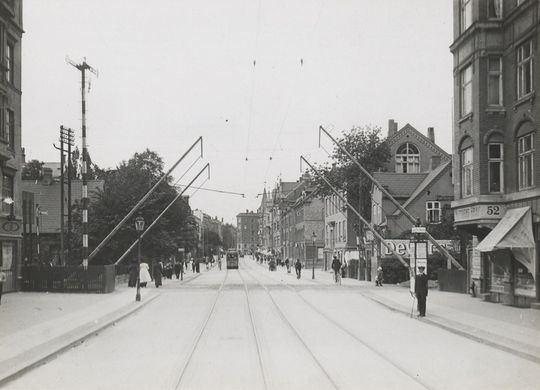
Railroad crossing Klampenborg Line crossed H. C. Ørsteds Vej as viewed from the south in the 1910s

The oldest section of the street, between Amalievej and Fuglevangsvej, was created and named in 1852. The section from Fuglevangsvej and Åboulevard (then Vinkelvej) was created in 1857, This new section of the street was originally called Jernbanevej since it was crossed by the tracks of the Nordbanen and Copenhagen–Fredericia/Taulov Line railway lines which split at Ladegårdsåen. Jernbanevej was included in H. C. Ørstedsvej in 1870.

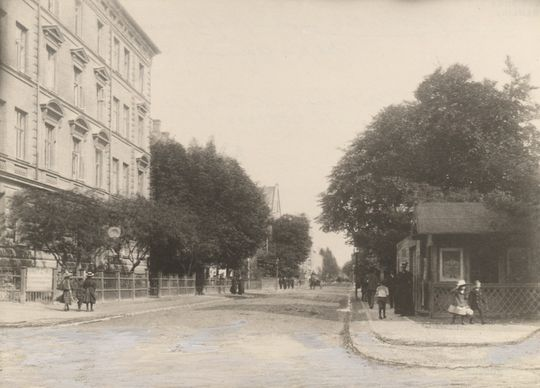
A view down H. C. Ørsteds Vej from Gammel Kongevej in the 1890s

Henning Wolf's masterplan for Frederiksberg Villa Quarter, a neighbourhood of single-family detached homes in the area north of Gammel Kongevej, it involved an extension of Jernbanevej to Gammel Kongevej. Other elements in Wolf's masterplan were the extension of Kastanievej to H. C. Ørstedsvej, establishment of Alhambravej, Uraniavej, Mynstersvej, Svanholmsvej and Forhåbningsholms Allé. A first short extension of Jernbanevej was initially called Priors Allé after a local landowner, a merchant named Prior, who owned a property at the site. The Trier family, who owned the country house Wilhelmineslyst at Gammel Kongevej, blocked the last section of the road extension until 1873. Priors Allé and Vilhelmineslyst Allé were at this point both included in H. C. Ørsteds Allé.

In 1860, Det Danske Gaskompagni ("The Danish Gas Company") opened Frederiksberg's first gasworks at the street. It closed in 1890 when the new Frederiksberg Gasworks opened at Flintholm a few kilometres outside the expanding town centre.

In 1873, M.I. Ballins Sønner (from 1918 Ballin & Hertz), a tannery and manufacturer of leather goods, built a factory at No. 48–50. The company moved to Valby in 1924 and its buildings on H. C. Ørsteds Vej were later demolished.

The railway crossing disappeared in the 1930s with the opening of the Boulevard Line in the 1930s.

== Notable buildings and residents ==
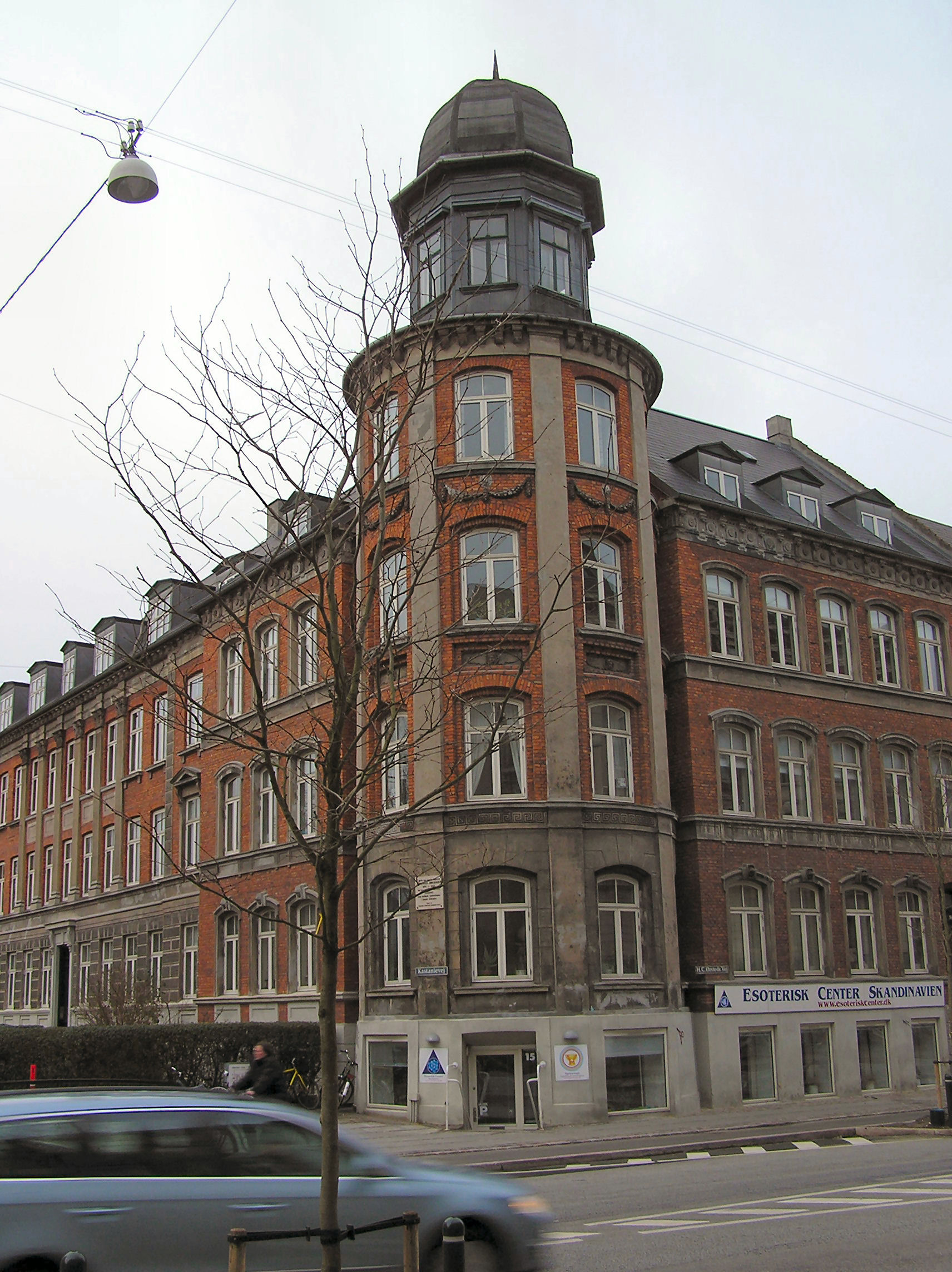
Symbolist poet Johannes Jørgensen's "tower", at the corner with Kastanievej, for which his periodical Taarnet ("The Tower") was named

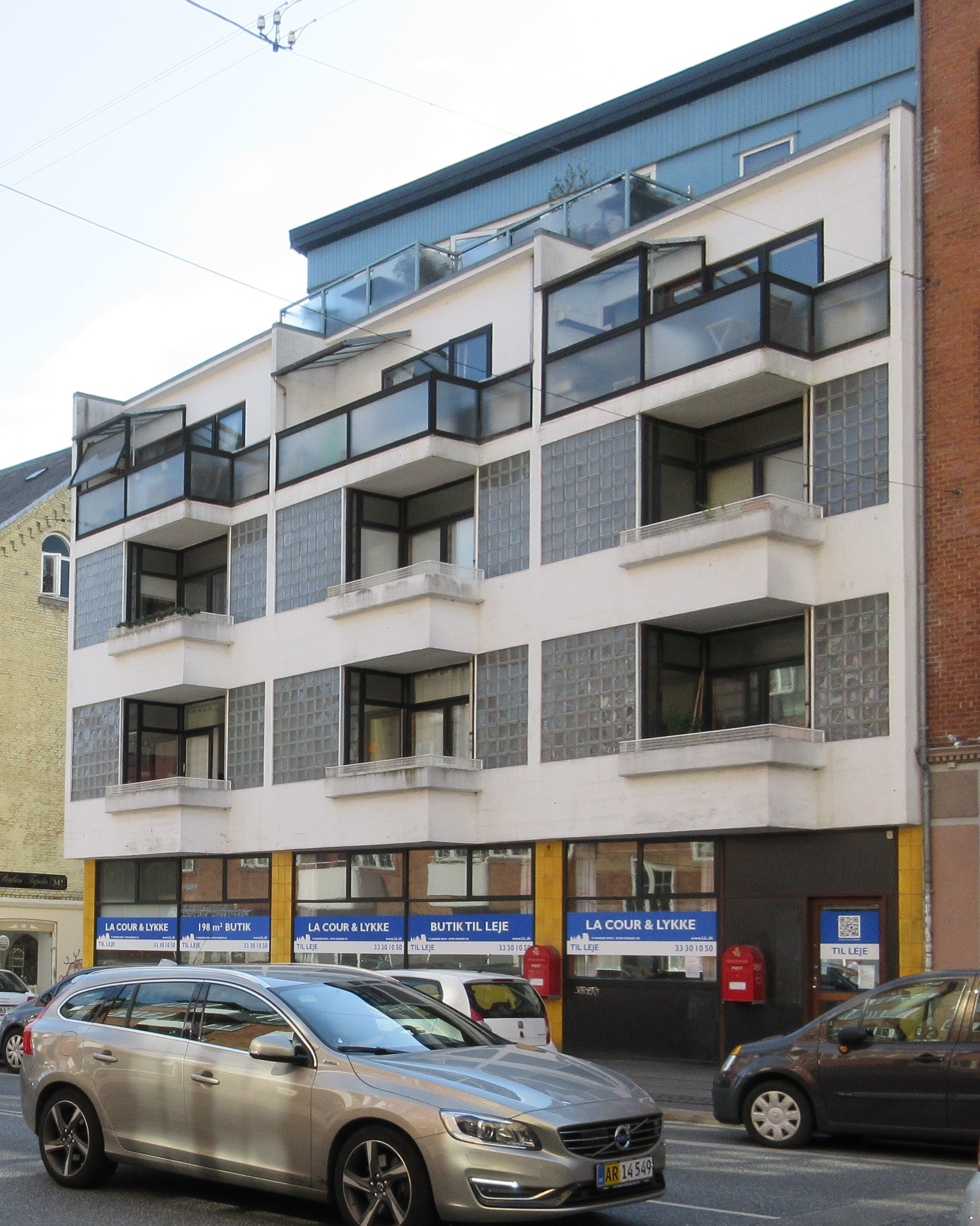
No. 54

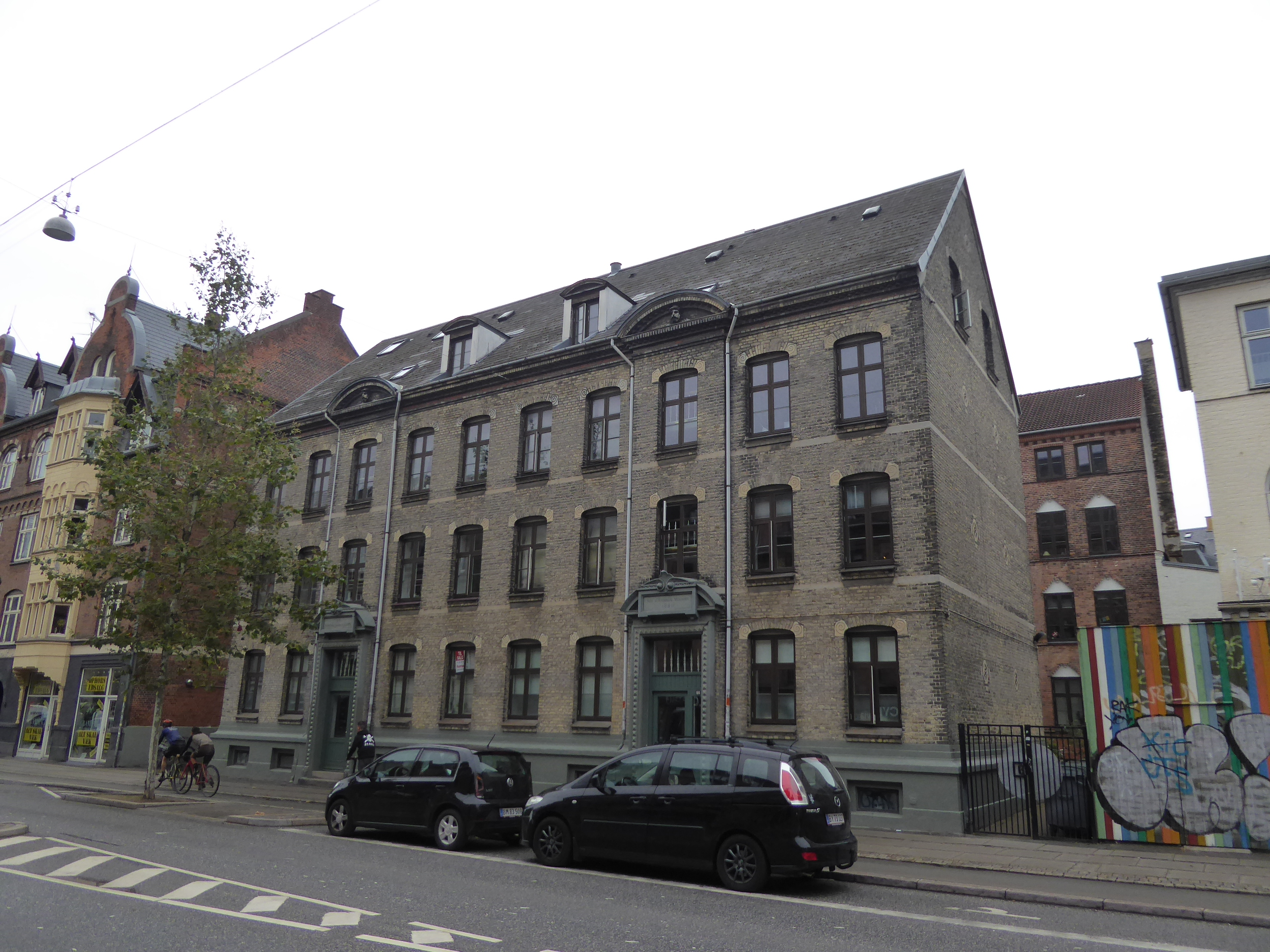
No 60-62

The building on the corner of H. C. Ørsteds Vej and Kastanievej is the one for which Johannes Jørgensen's periodical Taarnet ("The Tower") was named. He lived on the top floor between 1891 and 1893.

The four-storey Functionalist property at No. 54 is from 1934 and was designed by Edvard Thomsen for his father. It contained a post office on the ground floor and apartments on the upper floors.

Handskemagerforeningens Stiftelse (No. 60–62) was built for the Glovemakers' Association in 1880 to design by Alfred Råvad and August Johansen.

Åhusene ("The River Houses") at the corner with Åboulevard were designed by Ulrik Plesner and are from 1936 - 1938.

== Transport ==
The Forum Copenhagen Metro station at Julius Thomsens Plads is located just east of the northern end of the street by way of Rosenørns Allé. The southern end of the street is located closer to Frederiksberg Allé Station by way of Alhambravej and Frederiksberg Allé.

== Notable people ==
- Christine Daugaard (1831–1917), writer and poet, lived on a villa on the road in 1867.
- Carl Aller (1845–1926), magazine publisher, lived at No. 48 in 1883.
- Johannes Helms (1828–1895), educator and writer, lived at No. 32 in 1880–81.
- Johannes Jørgensen, poet, lived at No. 15
- Peter Lange-Müller (1850–1926), composer, lived on the 1st floor at No. 20A in 1883–91.

== See also ==
- Bülowsvej
- Amalievej
