= Albert Gottschalk =

Danish painter

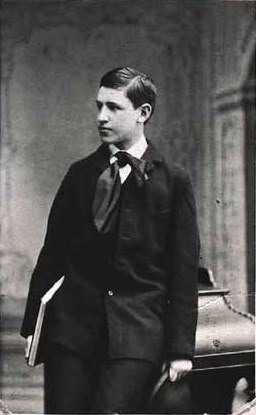
- Albert Gottschalk photographed by Georg Emil Hansen in the 1880s
- Born: 3 July 1866; Stege, Møn
- Died: 13 February 1906 (aged 39); Frederiksberg, Copenhagen
- Education: Royal Danish Academy of Fine Arts
- Known for: Painting

Albert Gottschalk (3 July 1866 – 13 February 1906) was a Danish painter. He had a close connection, personally and artistically, to the poets Johannes Jørgensen, Viggo Stuckenberg and Sophus Claussen.

== Biography ==
Albert Gottschalk was born in Stege on the island of Møn. but later moved to Copenhagen. He was educated at the Royal Danish Academy of Fine Arts from 1882 to 1883 and under Peder Severin Krøyer at the Artists Studio Schools from 1883 to 1888. He also studied privately with Karl Jensen and Karl Madsen.

Gottschalk was inspired by the Danish painter P.S. Krøyer as well as French art.

Gottschalk worked a long time with his motifs in his mind before painting them. He searched for his motifs in Denmark on his bicycle, and he found them often around Copenhagen. The paintings often look like they are quickly made sketches which was not recognised in Gottschalk's time.

== Gallery ==
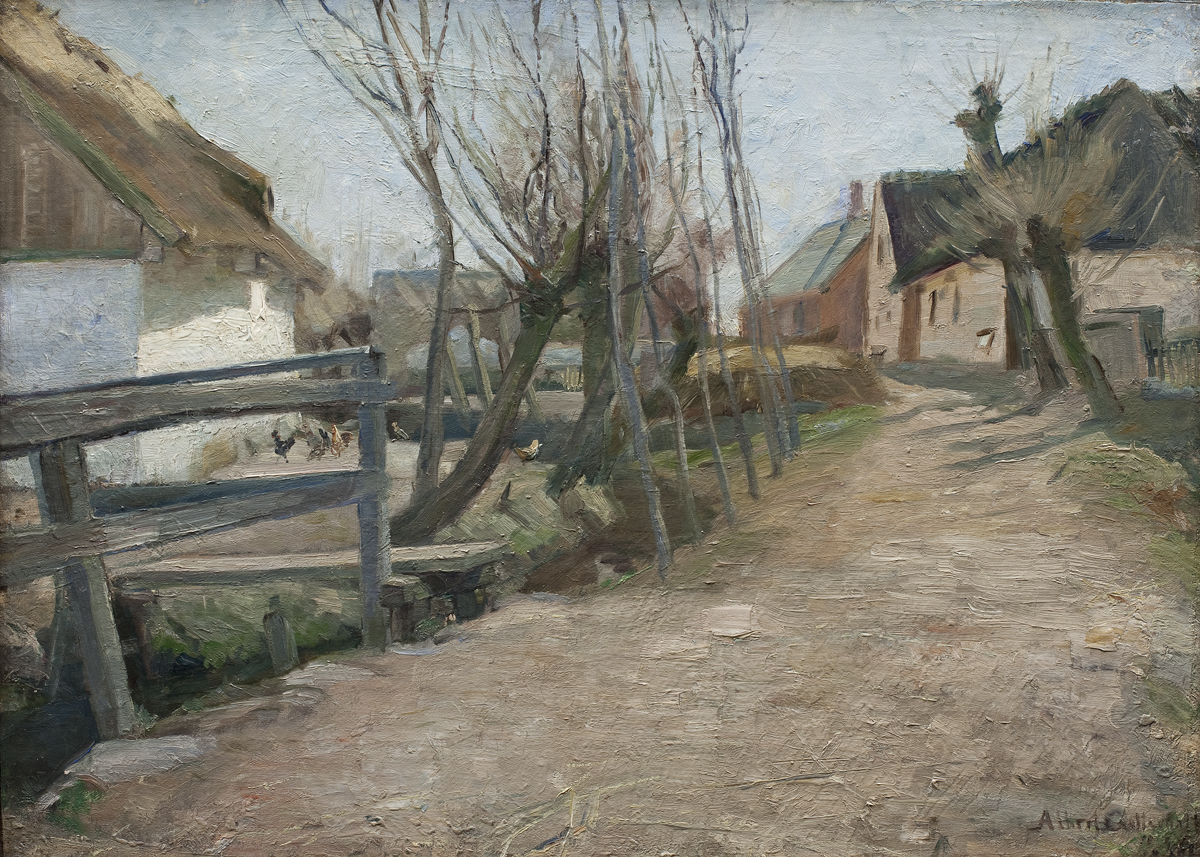
Early Spring Day in Glostrup

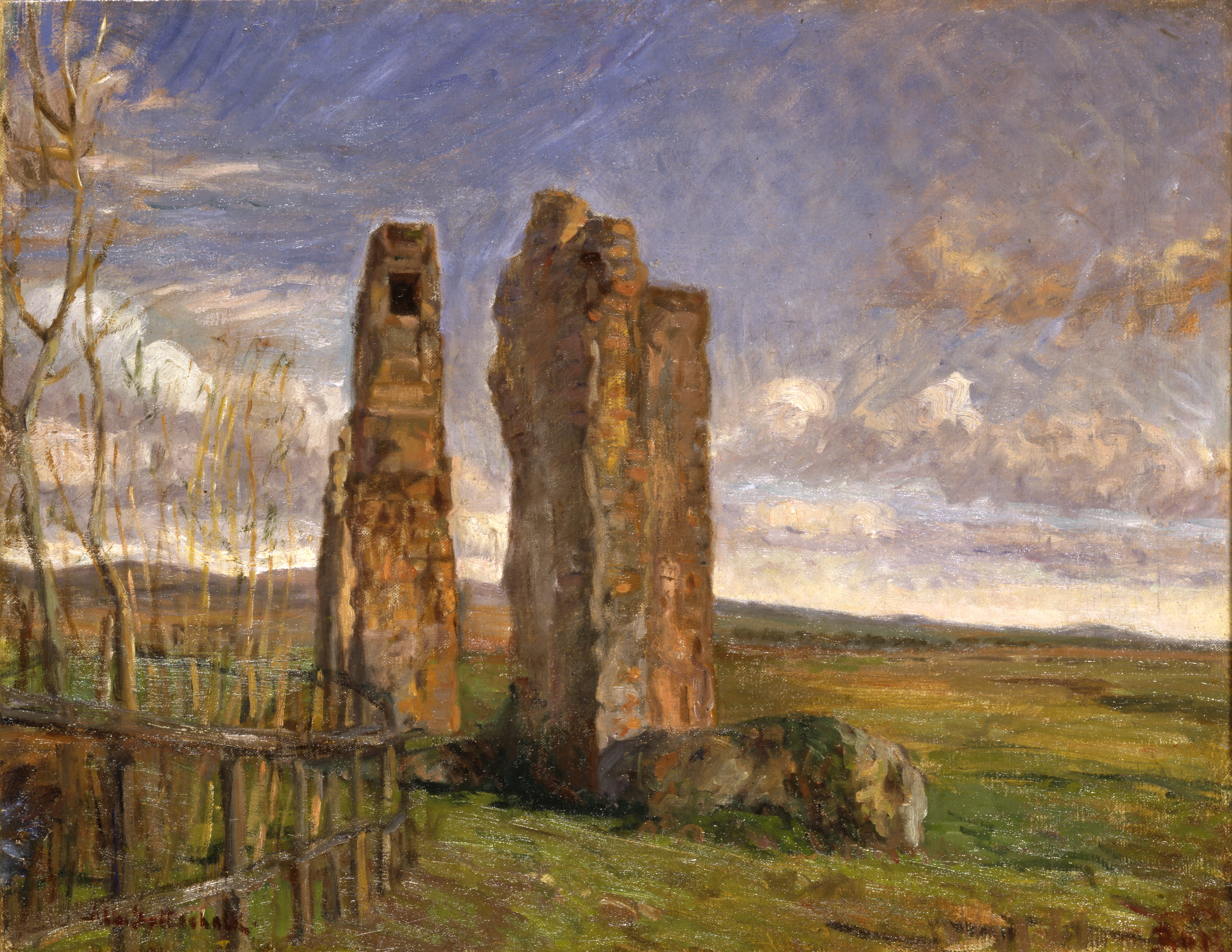
Ruins in the Campania

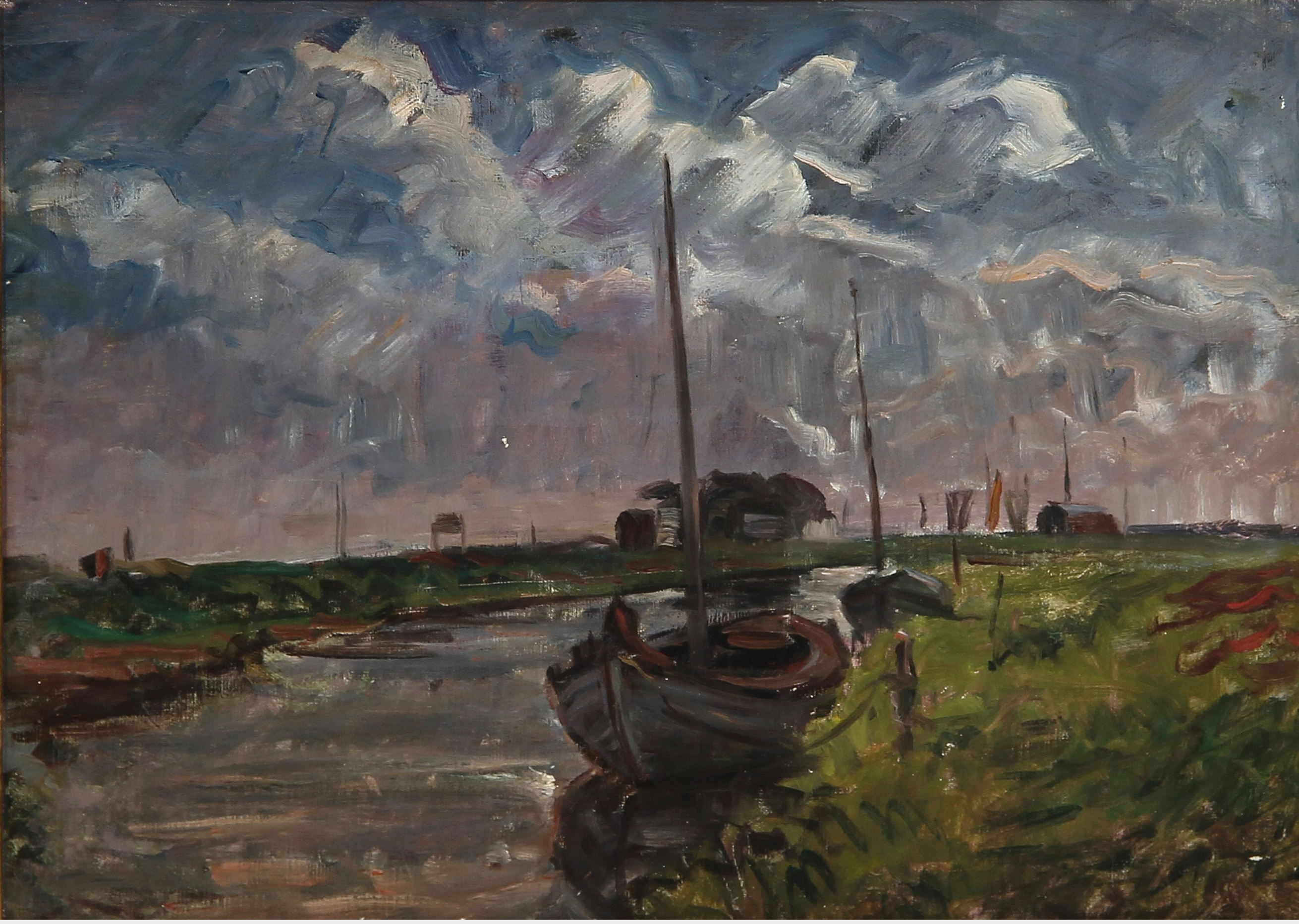
View at Køge

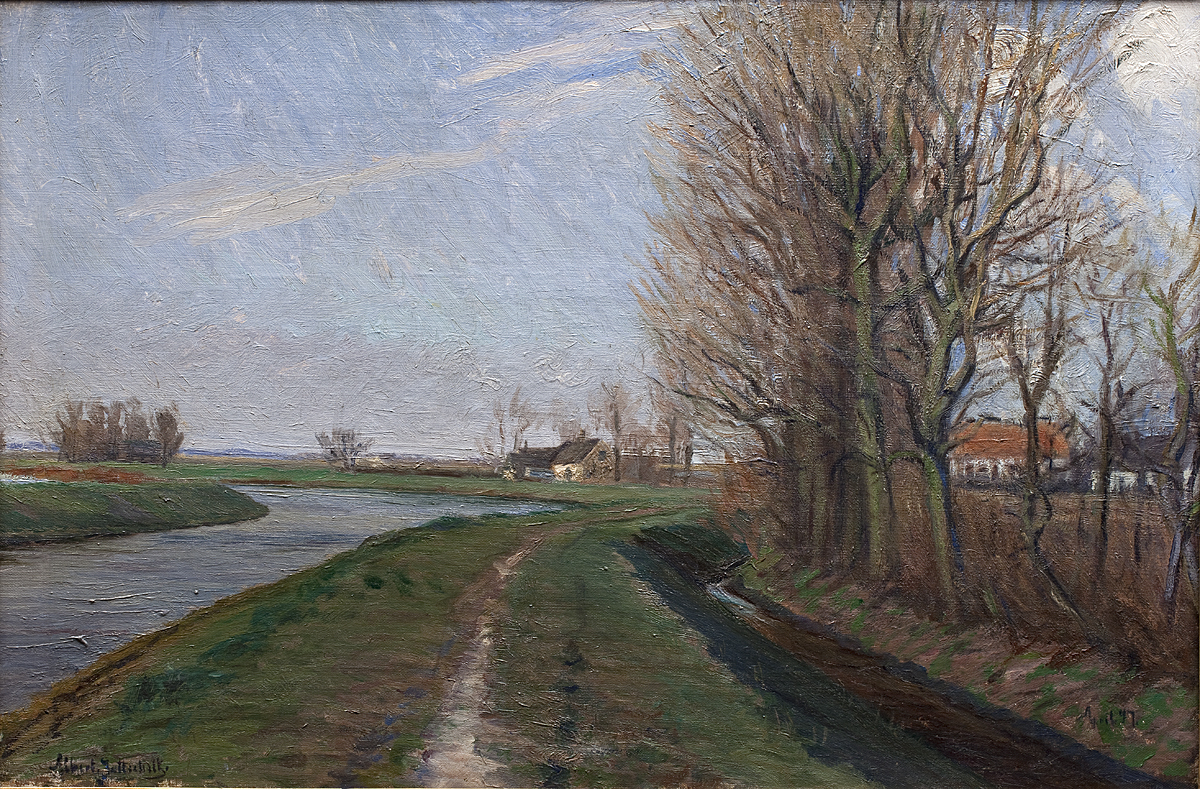
Afternoon in April

== Collections ==
- Statens Museum for Kunst, Copenhagen, Denmark
- Den Hirsprungske Samling, Copenhagen, Denmark
- David Collection, Denmark

== See also ==
- Art of Denmark

== Literature ==
- Nørregård-Nielsen, Hans Edvard: "Dansk Kunst", Gyldendal, 3.udg. 2.opl. pp. 296–299
