= Viggo Stuckenberg =

Danish poet and novelist (1863–1905)

Viggo Henrik Fog Stuckenberg
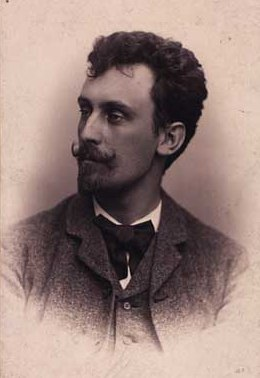
- Viggo Stuckenberg
- Born: 17 September 1863; Vridsløselille
- Died: 6 December 1905 (aged 42); Copenhagen
- Resting place: Assistens Cemetery, Copenhagen
- Spouse: Ingeborg Pamperin (m.1887-d.1904)
- Children: Two sons
- Parents: Frederick Henry Stuckenberg (father); Johanne Georgine (mother)

Viggo Henrik Fog Stuckenberg (17 September 1863 – 6 December 1905) was a Danish poet, notable for his lyrical and emotional poems. His work varied from faithful representation of nature in his early career to Expressionism and Realism. He befriended Sophus Claussen, Johannes Jørgensen and J. P. Jacobsen.

== Personal life ==
Stuckenberg was born in Vridsløselille where his father, Frederick Henry Stuckenberg (1832–1899), was a teacher at the state prison. His mother was Johanne Georgine Fog (1833–1895). There were three younger siblings, Borge, a painter, Tyge, and Else. In 1872, his father found employment in central Copenhagen, and the family moved to Nørrebro. Stuckenberg matriculated from the Von Westenske Institute in 1884. At the University of Copenhagen, he first studied theology, then science. In 1887, he married Ingeborg Pamperin (1866–1904). The couple had two sons, Henry (born May 1890) and Niels Holger (born December 1891). But the marriage ended with Ingeborg leaving her husband and children in 1903 to emigrate to New Zealand with the gardener Hans Madsen. When the new life quickly became a disappointment, Madsen returned to Denmark, and Pamperin took her own life in 1904. Stuckenberg married Madsen's ex-wife, Clara Holbøll (1868–1940), in 1904 and died in Copenhagen the following year of kidney inflammation. He was buried at Assistens Cemetery.

== Career ==
After leaving the university, Stuckenberg was employed as a teacher at Slomanns School in Frederiksberg where he remained for the rest of his life. His debut as a poet was in 1886 with the publication of a work titled Digte (poems). Other works included: I Gennembrud (The Breakthrough, short story) in 1887; Messias (Messiah, short story) in 1889; Den vilde Jæger (The Wild Hunter, fairytale poem) in 1894; Fagre Ord (Fair Words, novel) in 1895; Valravn (novel) in 1896; Sol (Sun, novel) in 1897, Flyvende Sommer (Flying Summer, poems) in 1898; Vejbred (fairy tales and legends) and Asmadæus in 1899; Sne (Snow, containing a number of his finest and best-known poems) in 1901; and Aarsens Tid (Aarsen's Time, Twelve Poems) in 1905. His Sidste Digte (Last Poems) were published posthumously in 1906. His own life drama was a lasting source of inspiration for his poetry, where the main themes were marriage, luck, and accident. His best-known poems, all set to music, are: To som elsker hinanden (music: Emil Reesen), Forårsregn (music: Jens Bjerg) and Åliv (music: Svend S. Schultz).

After his marriage to Pamperin, he was highly regarded by the circle of poets whom he befriended. Stuckenberg and his wife often hosted artists who published in the literary journal Taarnet. They included Claussen and Jørgensen, generating new ideas in literary circles. His works were compared with those of Jacobsen and Turgenev.

Stuckenberg had studied eastern European languages and hence, was particularly attracted by Russian poetry. Indeed, his own work often reflected Russian themes, especially in regard to his characters: men were often depicted as weak and lazy dreamers while women showed will and ability.

== Assessment ==
Stuckenberg's writings, though good, were hardly the most popular of his times, either then or now. It is generally agreed his poetry is his best work though it is not in the same class as Sophus Claussen's. Nor can his prose stand up to Henrik Pontoppidan's. Initially his poetry was bleak and heavy but by the end of the century (with Flyvende Sommer and Sne), it had become much lighter.

Like his other works, his poems are based on his own life, almost becoming a biography, describing many crises, from childhood to marriage. Fagre Ord, written in collaboration with his wife Ingeborg, and Valravn bring out the difficulties of a stormy marriage from both the husband's and wife's point of view. From a historical perspective, Stuckenberg is rather isolated. While his works were built on Romanticism and the Modern Breakthrough, they were not part of these movements and thus, they fail to look to the future and seldom invoking symbolism. His work had little influence on other authors.
