= Emil Aarestrup =

Danish poet

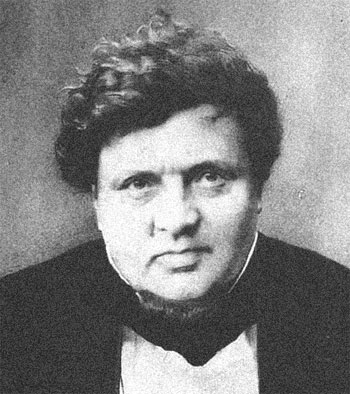
Carl Ludvig Emil Aarestrup

Carl Ludvig Emil Aarestrup (4 December 1800 – 21 July 1856) was a Danish medical doctor and poet, who had just one single volume of poetry published throughout his lifetime, yet this gave him a lasting place in Danish literature, due to the originality of the poems, as well as their persistent exploration of erotic themes, somewhat uncommon to the day.

== Life and career ==
Aarestrup was born in Store Kongensgade in Copenhagen, in a period designated by the Napoleonic Wars, which Denmark had been dragged into, and which left the country officially bankrupt. Nevertheless, this period is often characterized as the Danish Golden Age.

His father was a customs officer in the service of the absolute monarchy and also a bon vivant.

Aarestrup had a younger brother, but when he was seven years old, their parents were separated, and tragically both died shortly after, leaving the two Aarestrup boys orphaned, but in the care of a local elderly spinster, Marie Møller, and the boys' grandfather, a dealer in tea and porcelain. As a poet, Aarestrup would later return to feelings of loss and loneliness, perhaps caused by these traumatic childhood experiences.

In 1819 Aarestrup became a student, and continued to study medicine at the University of Copenhagen, graduating as a physician in 1827. That same year he married his 15 year old cousin Caroline Aagard and together they settled in Nysted on the Danish island Lolland, where he would have his practice. It was later found out that he had actually fathered an illegitimate daughter with his landlords wife during his studies in Copenhagen, which naturally put strains on his relations with Caroline, but even so, he made provisions for this daughter also, besides from fathering no less than 12 children with his wife. The Aarestrup couple would live in Nysted from 1827 until 1838, when Aarestrup got hold of a more profitable district, better suited for his expenses to the growing family, though still not sufficient. In 1849 he finally succeeded in obtaining the much larger post of District Physician in Funen, overseeing the other doctors. Again he and his family moved, for the last time, to Odense, where he spent the remainder of his life.

== Works ==
Working as a doctor, he wrote poetry in his spare time. Only one book was published while he was alive, in 1838: "Digte" ("Poems"). It was generally ignored by critics as well as the public at the time of its release. Another was published after his death in 1863: "Efterladte Digte" ("Posthumous poems").

Among Danish lyricists, Aarestrup is considered one of the most genuine amorists. Especially in his ritornelles and short and emphasized verses he reaches mastery. As a verse technician he is influenced by the German poet Friedrich Rückert but finds his own form. Compared to most contemporary Danish love poets he is much more sensual, material and audacious though still respecting decorum. His tune is teasing, ironic, witty and elegant but sometimes with a hidden fear of death and vanity. Among his most famous poems must be mentioned Paa Sneen (“On the Snow”), Angst (“Fear”), Til Nanna (“For Nanna”), Tidlig Skilsmisse (“Early Divorce”) and Var det Synd? (“Was It a Sin?”). Less known today are his few political poems that reveal his liberal sympathies.

== Legacy ==
Although not recognized in his own time, he is now widely considered one of the most influential Danish poets and is still read in Denmark today. Normally his poetry is regarded as an important precursor of the great poet Sophus Claussen.

== See also ==
- Physician writer
