= Emil Reesen =

Danish composer and pianist

- Born: 30 May 1887
- Died: 27 March 1964 (aged 76)
- Occupations: Composter, conductor, pianist
- Family: Frederik Magle (great-nephew)

Emil Reesen (30 May 1887 – 27 March 1964) was a Danish composer, conductor and pianist. Aside from composing for ballets and operas he was also a noted film score composer. He is remembered mainly for his operetta Farinelli (1942), which is still popular today.

== Life ==
Emil Reesen studied with private tutors such as the composer Vilhelm Rosenberg and the pianist Siegfried Langgaard (a pupil of Franz Liszt). He made his debut as a concert pianist in 1911 and was employed as a conductor for the Danish Radio Symphony Orchestra in 1927. In 1931 he also began working as a ballet conductor at the Royal Danish Theatre. Later in his life he conducted the Vienna Symphony and recorded with the Berlin Philharmonic. Emil Reesen was the father of the composer Morten Reesen (1928–1961) and the great-uncle of the composer Frederik Magle (his sister's grandson).

== Notable works ==
- 1926 Rapsodien Himmerland
- 1928 Variationer over et tema af Schubert
- 1931 Gaucho, ballet
- 1933 Gudindernes Strid, ballet
- 1934 Zaporogerne, ballet
- 1941 Trianon. Suite i gammel stil
- 1941 Historien om en Moder, opera (Det kgl. Teater)
- 1942 Farinelli, operetta (text: Mogens Dam)
- 1948 Gadeprinsessen, operette
- 1950 Video, fjernsynsballet
- 1924 Lille Lise Let-på-Tå (Scalarevyen "Regnbuen")
- 1925 Adrienne med sin luftantenne (Scalarevyen)
- 1925 Roselille men uden mor (Scalarevyen)
- 1925 Vil du sænke dit øje (Scalarevyen)
- 1941 Et Flag er smukkest i Modvind (Poul Sørensen)
- 1944 To som elsker hinanden (Viggo Stuckenberg)
- 1948 Vuggevise (Mogens Kaarøe)

== Film music ==
- 1922 Häxan
- 1937 Flådens blå matroser
- 1937 Plat eller krone
- 1940 En desertør
- 1941 Niels Pind og hans dreng
- 1941 En forbryder
- 1943 Kriminalassistent Bloch
- 1944 Familien Gelinde
- 1944 Spurve under taget
- 1946 Oktoberroser
- 1948 Hvor er far ?
- 1950 Din fortid er glemt

== See also ==
- List of Danish composers
