= Naomi Lebowitz =

American literary scholar

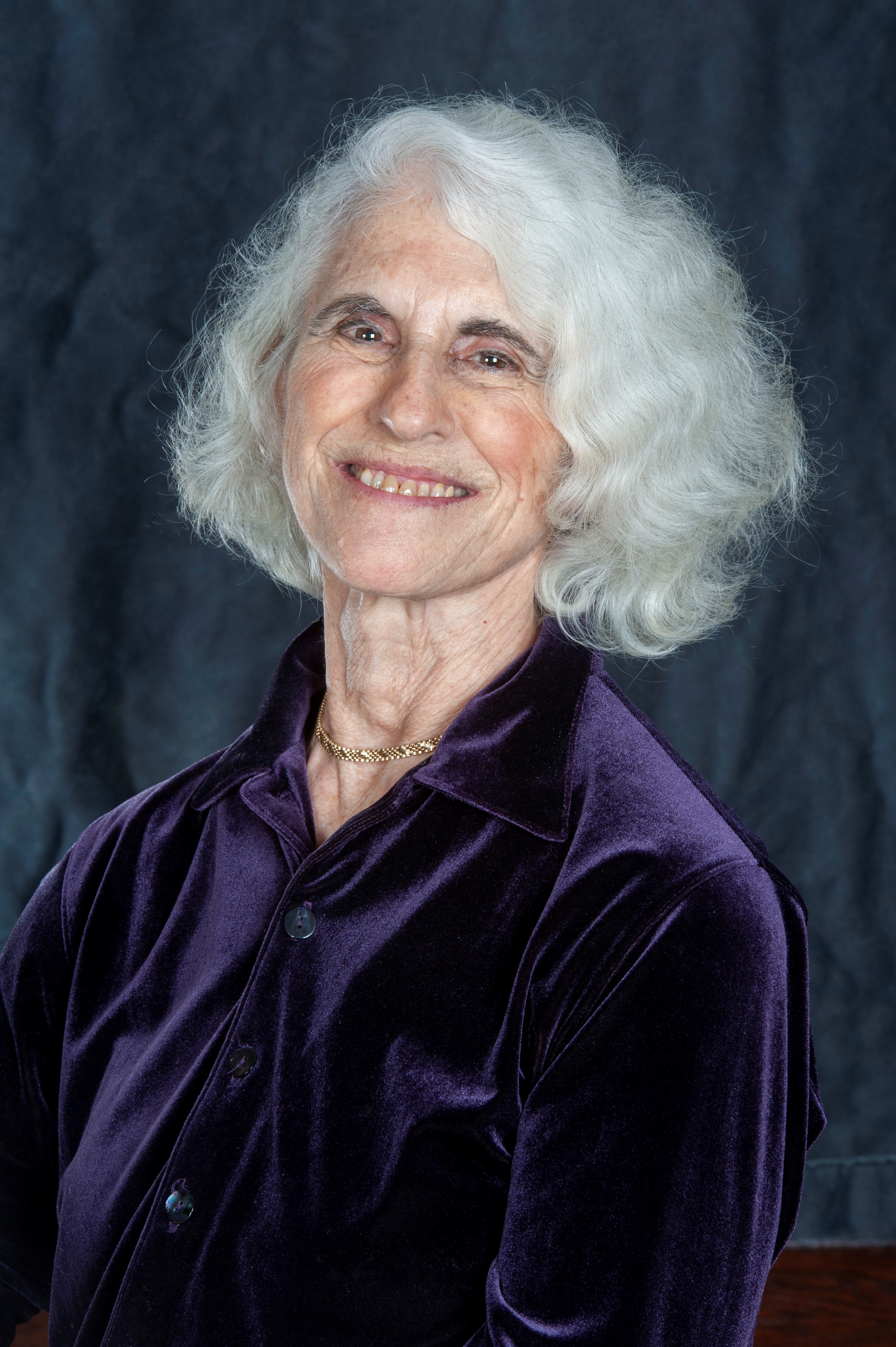
Lebowitz in 2012

Naomi Gordon Lebowitz (born February 6, 1932) is a literary philosopher, author, critic, and scholar of American, English, Scandinavian, and continental European literature, as well as a translator of Danish fiction.

Her seven book-length critical studies of authors and thinkers have focused on the difficulties of spiritual and religious passion in the face of modern belief systems. Lebowitz's studies were sometimes eclipsed by the concentration of American academics on deconstructionist theory during the latter decades of the twentieth-century. More recent approaches that value intersectionality and historicism, however, have validated her importance as a scholar, critic, and philosopher.

Lebowitz's acclaimed translation of the Nobel-Prize winning Danish author Henrik Pontoppidan's 1917 novel Lykke-Per (English: Lucky Per) was published in 2010. In Lebowitz's "fluent and lucid version", Lucky Per was hailed by James Wood in The New Yorker as a "shattering, sometimes unbearably powerful novel". The first translation into English of the novel, it was republished by Alfred A. Knopf in 2019 in an Everyman's Library edition.

== Early years and education ==
Lebowitz was born Naomi Gordon in St. Louis, Missouri, on February 6, 1932. Her parents were Rabbi Julius Gordon and Mildred (Dubin) Gordon, a teacher. Both parents had Orthodox Jewish forebears. Her father served Shaare Emeth, one of the leading Reform congregations in the United States, guiding it through the Great Depression, World War II, and a move from St. Louis's Central West End to the suburb of University City. Lebowitz's twin sister, Ruth, would also become a critic and scholar.

Lebowitz earned a bachelor's degree from Wellesley College after studying for a year at the Sorbonne. She returned to St. Louis and in 1953 married Harvard Law School graduate and U. S. Army Air Corps veteran Albert Lebowitz, who was ten years her senior, the son of a St. Louis tailor with extended family from Poland and Russia. She then enrolled at Washington University in St. Louis to earn an M.A. in Romance languages (with a thesis about critical reactions to the poetry of Lautréamont) in 1955, followed by a Ph.D. in English literature in 1962 with a dissertation about Henry James entitled "Henry James and the Moral Imperative of Relationship".

== Academic and teaching career ==
Lebowitz joined the faculties of the Washington University English and Comparative Literature Departments in 1962, and was honored by the student body for excellence in teaching in 1968. She was the first woman in the English Department to be paid the same salary as male colleagues with comparable credentials. Lebowitz rarely taught the same books more than once and reveled in designing creative syllabi that juxtaposed writers from different traditions in dialogues to be mediated by her student readers. A typical, one-of-a-kind graduate seminar, offered in 1976, brought together six authors writing in four languages under the title "James's Balzac, Conrad's Flaubert, and Kafka's Svevo."

Representative of appreciative students over the years was her dissertation advisee Brian Walter, who noted in 2012 that Lebowitz actually designed two new courses each semester — which covered "the full historical, philosophical and cross-cultural foundations of modern narrative." In her books too Lebowitz approached her literary subjects as figures in a constellation of human endeavor that she arranged to create dialectical discussion. Her wide-ranging scholarly studies frequently reference the work of sixteenth-century philosopher and essayist Michel de Montaigne. In 1989, Professor Lebowitz was named Hortense and Tobias Lewin Distinguished Scholar in the Humanities by Washington University, a position she held until her retirement 11 years later.

== Professor emerita and active retirement ==
In 2000, Lebowitz retired as professor emerita. Remaining active and productive in her retirement, she published a substantial critical article in Scandinavian Studies in 2006. In 2010, at age 78, she completed and saw published what would become an acclaimed translation of the internationally respected eight-volume Danish novel Lucky Per, first published by Nobel Prize winner Henrik Pontoppidan in 1904. (Her translation would be republished nine years later in Knopf's Everyman's Library Contemporary Classics series.) In 2012 the university honored her with a Distinguished Alumni Award. Following the death of Albert Lebowitz in 2016, she continued to study and write at her home in University City, Missouri. The Albert and Naomi Lebowitz Papers, 1962–1996 are held by the Special Collections Library at Washington University in St. Louis.

== Intellectual associations ==
Both Naomi and Albert Lebowitz (who published a short-story collection, two novels and a study entitled "The Legal Mind and the Presidency") associated professionally and socially with a prominent Washington University literary circle. The circle included poets Howard Nemerov, Mona Van Duyn (both former U.S. poet laureates), and John N. Morris; critic and editor Jarvis Thurston; painter Joan Elkin; novelists and fiction writers William H. Gass and Stanley Elkin; literary critic Richard Stang; and others. Nemerov immortalized the Lebowitzes and their backyard in his poem "By Al Lebowitz's Pool": "Beside the pool we drink, talk, and are still, / These times of kindness mortality allows."

Stanley Elkin based the character "Insight Lady" in his novel The Franchiser (1976) on Lebowitz, of whom the novelist said, "Naomi is the world's most intense person. She's very funny. She can be drinking coffee, or jogging or doing anything, but she's always thinking about The Big Stuff. And constantly coming up with these insights . . . . Through her I know what an intellectual is: an intellectual is one who thinks all the time and puts everything in terms of grand ideas."

Likewise, British novelist Iris Murdoch wrote to Lebowitz, in April 1987: "You are deep, deep, and yes in the highest sense also simple, and so is Al, to whom I send much love." The Lebowitzes' friendship with Murdoch and her husband, Oxford professor and critic John Bayley, began when the latter couple visited St. Louis in 1972. The two women "clearly enjoyed exchanging views on art, literature and politics," shared a resistance to deconstructionist literary theory, and established an extended correspondence that lasted for years. Both were disturbed by the professional ambitions they perceived behind contemporary debates over literary theory: "The whole structuralist scene is such a mess—clever old Derrida [French theorist Jacques Derrida], stupid messy critics, each man for himself. Motives, motives," Murdoch wrote to Lebowitz in May 1985.

== Publications ==
=== The Imagination of Loving: Henry James's Legacy to the Novel (1965) ===
Lebowitz's first book, an extension of her PhD thesis, drew praise in the journal Nineteenth-Century Fiction for its study of overarching meaning in the fictions of Henry James during an era when most scholars focused on the novelist's technique and local themes. In undertaking "this formidable task," writes Oscar Cargill, Lebowitz finds in James "a moralist with plastic values determined by the quality of the communion between individuals, the highest communion being achieved in the love relationship."

=== Humanism and the Absurd in the Modern Novel (1971) ===
Lebowitz's second book approached contemporary literary debate by offering "an apology for a humanism that finds its expression mainly in the 'old' form of the modern novel, a form that is generally considered dead or dying because its traditional habitat has vanished." She roots her definition of humanism in the attitudes and observations of Montaigne, because "the humility of his expectation for humanism is the most central quality of his legacy to the novel."

Donna Gerstenberger, reviewing for Modern Fiction Studies, sees hope in Lebowitz's view "that the novelist's world need not become the either/or choice between humanism and the absurd which many critics and writers see as the life and death crisis facing the modern novel." The Montaignian humanist, Lebowitz believes, "admits weaknesses and terrors because they are universal; he does not admire them because they are imagined to be unique. We replaces the you or I of the absurdist. Montaigne expects less of mankind than does the absurdist, so he accepts more." Exegeses of novels by Flaubert, George Eliot, Dostoevsky, E. M. Forster, and André Gide support Lebowitz's theory. Her final chapter, "Old Wine in New Bottles," applies her analysis to works by Saul Bellow, Franz Kafka, Doris Lessing, and Samuel Beckett, works by her novelist colleagues at Washington University William H. Gass and Stanley Elkin, and by Italo Svevo, the subject of her next book.

=== Italo Svevo (1978) ===
In the first thorough English-language study of Ettore Schmitz, (pen name, Italo Svevo), Lebowitz also produced a sweeping consideration of an era in European literature. Svevo lived in Trieste, within the Habsburg Empire on the edge of Italy, "a city with an Austrian head and an Italian heart." Long neglected as an author, Svevo was later discovered by James Joyce, who tutored him in English and championed him as a father of modern Italian literature for his novel Confessions of Zeno (more recently translated as Zeno's Conscience).

Lebowitz's interest in Svevo reveals her predilection for locating "personality" or "temperament" in literature while shunning the rigid critical categories that other critics have used in approaching this author. She finds instead that "[Svevo] is open on all sides to every cultural influence that shaped the modern novel—to the self-irony of Austria's literary Jew and to his psychoanalysis; to the Slavic preference for the insulted and the injured; to the cramped dreams of France's post-Napoleonic heroes doomed to live out bourgeois monarchies; to pathologists dissecting the old morality, Schopenhauer, Nietzsche, and Ibsen; to a new Italian fiction waiting for wider recognition . . . ." Svevo, Lebowitz argues, subordinated the outside world to his "amiable temperament" and despite lacking revolutionary attitudes, became "one of the most original writers of modern fiction."

Scholars of Italian and English literature alike praised Lebowitz for her "exciting" and "demanding" approach to Svevo. In World Literature Today, Rosetta d. Piclardi notes that Lebowitz compares Svevo with Montaigne because for both authors "a healthy and creative amateurism . . . allows them the widest of visions . . . . Life may be unconquerable chaos, but the unanxious life is not worth living . . . . This stance is at the root of the comic tension that sustains Svevo's masterpiece." Lebowitz's appreciation of Svevo foreshadows her embrace of "amateurism" as a literary value almost two decades later. But first she would focus on two northern European writers, Søren Kierkegaard and Henrik Ibsen, who were pre-occupied with the moral and religious questions of their Protestant heritage.

=== Kierkegaard: A Life of Allegory (1985) ===
While teaching Kierkegaard's Fear and Trembling in World Masterpieces classes, Lebowitz found it to be the most popular book on the syllabus. After learning to read Kierkegaard's works in the original Danish, she discovered that "his deceiving surfaces were really disguises that hid the depths." Her engagement with Kierkegaard's thought led Lebowitz to write about his "use of literary devices to break through speculative philosophy and over-ambitious ethical claims."

While Kierkegaard: A Life of Allegory deepened Lebowitz's embrace of Scandinavian literature and spiritual themes, it received mixed reviews, perhaps because it defied conventions by applying her particular form of reader-response literary criticism to an author categorized as a philosopher. "There is no doubt Lebowitz has come up with an extremely original approach to Kierkegaard, but in her desire to reflect his authorship it has perhaps been a serious mistake to attempt to write in his style," asserted Julia Watkin. Mark C. Taylor appreciated Lebowitz's "understanding of the nature of the life that is transcribed in the body of the text," but criticized her for not taking deconstructionist theory into account. In fact, as her correspondence with Iris Murdoch indicates, Lebowitz had studied deconstruction and decided it was an academic fad. Readers of Kierkegaard must decide, Lebowitz writes, "whether the perpetual transition from psychological sickness to spiritual health, repeatedly enacted, is finally a persuasive reality for others."

=== Ibsen and the Great World (1990) ===
Norwegian playwright Henrik Ibsen wrote in Danish, so Lebowitz was able to extend her immersion in that language with a vision of "how Ibsen's irony opens up a path to a spiritual dimension mankind is not yet able to inhabit." This book received wider attention than her Kierkegaard study, with the reviewer Adrian Machiraju finding it "undoubtedly impressive" as "a unifying interpretation, in terms of a constant and yet self-parodying striving towards the unattainable Great World" which "enables her to find a consistent logic in all the later plays." James R. Scrimgeour also praises Lebowitz's success in showing that Ibsen is "not merely a social dramatist but a citizen of the 'Great World,' a human being whose 'demands for spiritual expansion' are 'difficult and merciless.' " While Scrimgeour objects that Lebowitz's critical language is too abstract, he admires her because "she sinks her teeth into the jugular of bourgeois morality . . . as she continuously explores the contrast between the great world inhabited by great spirits (existential thinkers such as Nietzsche, Kierkegaard, Dostoevski, and Kafka) and the small confined middle-class world, the houses inhabited by the characters of Ibsen's plays." Likewise he praises her "extensive and exhaustive" scholarship and "provocative and original readings of other inhabitants of the great world, [especially] her readings of Madame Bovary, Lawrence's The Rainbow, and Kafka's 'A Country Doctor.' "

=== Dickens, Manzoni, Zola, and James: The Impossible Romance Co-authored with Ruth Newton (1990) ===
Lebowitz collaborated with her twin sister, independent scholar Ruth (Gordon) Newton, to produce a literary study focused on authors who, they argued, refused to yield their "moral passion" to social and historical conventions. The Impossible Romance explicates novels by Charles Dickens, Alessandro Manzoni, Émile Zola, and Henry James to demonstrate that these novelists create powerful narratives by exploiting "the dramatic autonomy and collision of the historical and spiritual spheres." Novels that embrace the "impossible romance" of history and spirit do so by seeking to adapt traditional narrative forms with experimental energy. Thus, "the novels of these authors remind us of spiritual possibilities that may still be wrested from history."

Reviewing for Comparative Literature Studies, Gregory Maertz summarized the study's themes and called it "elegantly written and ambitious." He noted the authors' combination of two important theoretical arguments, the philosophical and the formal, lauding a "sensitivity bordering on Johnsonian openness in their assessment of [the] value of human experience—as reflected in the biographies of writers as a key to understanding some of the most prized examples of the nineteenth-century novel in Europe and America."

While this co-authored book aligns with Lebowitz's humanist approach in her work, it also advances the discussion by proposing that "the unrivaled power and tension in the best works" of these four novelists "are derived precisely from the authors' imaginative experimentation with the dialectic structure of this perpetual opposition."

=== The Philosophy of Literary Amateurism (1994) ===
In her last critical book before she turned her primary efforts to translation, Lebowitz made a case against the theoretical emphases, particularly deconstructionist theory and the narrow professionalism prevailing in literary studies during the 1980s. Her response is an innovative, polemical "philosophy of literary amateurism." Asked to summarize this book, Lebowitz said she intended to return the "great masters of fiction to the chosen amateurism of their literary philosophies." Scholar Richard Hibbitt writes that Lebowitz's study "proposes that certain writers benefit from the ability to conceive art with what she describes as an anti-professional disposition."

The Philosophy of Literary Amateurism takes the Essais of Montaigne as its guiding light, locating Montaigne's excellence in his openness to imperfection: "Disease, defect, digression are the intrinsic signs that the Essais are realizing their double-rooted entelechy, to try and to train, by keeping aesthetics and morality, epistemology and ethics as consubstantial in the amateur's book as they are in our amateur lives."

=== Lucky Per by Henrik Pontoppidan, translated from the Danish by Naomi Lebowitz (2010, 2019) ===
When Lebowitz first read Lykke Per, Nobelist Henrik Pontoppidan's "neglected modern masterpiece" in the original Danish, her sustained interest in Scandinavian literature heightened her lifetime fascination with the interplay of religious desire and modern disbelief. Awarded the 2007 Leif and Inger Sjöberg Award given as part of the American-Scandinavian Foundation's 28th annual Translation Prize competition, Lebowitz went on to complete the first-ever English translation of this novel, in which she found "the fairy tale and social realism" in collision. One of the central concerns of the novel, Lebowitz has said, is "the problem of the orphaned will wracked by guilty desires and thwarted by a speculative world of bureaucratic materialism."

Reviewing Lebowitz's translation, Judith Strong Albert noted, "Lebowitz's attraction to one of the two major characters in the story is special: The figure of Jakobe Salomon is that of a strong-willed secular Jewish woman whose love of Denmark is threatened by her intense awareness of a subtle, centuries old anti-Semitism which pervades the country." Novelist Garth Risk Hallberg, who wrote the introduction to the 2019 Everyman's Library republication of Lucky Per, agrees with this assessment of the character of Jakobe. "What really drew me in, when Naomi Lebowitz sent me her translation in 2010, was the fire that so often seems on the verge of shooting from the walls," Hallberg says. In Lebowitz's translation, he adds, "Jakobe is as intelligent as anyone out of James, as bold as anyone out of Austen, as perverse as anyone out of Dostoevsky."

Lebowitz's translation of Lucky Per was also praised in a lengthy review by respected New Yorker critic James Wood. "Heavy, God-infested, magnificently metaphysical, unafraid to court ridicule, and playing for the highest possible stakes," Wood says of the novel. "They don't write like that anymore." Lebowitz, he said, "administered the translator's equivalent of a magic kiss and roused [Lucky Per] from shameful oblivion." Another reviewer, Camille Cusumano for Medium, proclaimed, "Naomi Lebowitz, a professor at Washington University, has done a brilliant translation of the work." And Hallberg's introduction to the Everyman's Library edition of the novel compliments Lebowitz's sensitivity to the subtleties of the original Danish in her shadings of the word lykke in the novel. Lebowitz respects lykke, which means both "happiness" and "luck," Hallberg notes, by letting it "rustle through a range of nearby idioms—'by chance,' 'hazard,' 'fortunately.' "

== Selected works ==
- Discussions of Henry James. Ed. with an introduction by Naomi Lebowitz. Boston: D. C. Heath, 1962.
- Lebowitz, Naomi. The Imagination of Loving: Henry James's Legacy to the Novel. Detroit: Wayne State University Press, 1965.
- Lebowitz, Naomi. Humanism and the Absurd in the Modern Novel. Evanston: Northwestern University Press, 1971.
- Lebowitz, Naomi. Italo Svevo. New Brunswick: Rutgers University Press, 1978.
- Lebowitz, Naomi. Ibsen and the Great World. Baton Rouge: Louisiana State University Press, 1990.
- Lebowitz, Naomi and Newton, Ruth. Dickens, Manzoni, Zola, and James: The Impossible Romance. Columbia, Missouri: University of Missouri Press, 1990.
- Lebowitz, Naomi. The Philosophy of Literary Amateurism. Columbia, Missouri: University of Missouri Press, 1994.
- Lebowitz, Naomi. "The American Scholar & the Rose Rabbi" in Three Essays: Reflections on the American Century: William H. Gass, Naomi Lebowitz, Gerald Early. Ed. Wayne Fields. St. Louis, Washington University: Missouri Historical Society Press, 2000.
- Lucky Per by Henrik Pontoppidan, translated from the Danish, with an afterword, by Naomi Lebowitz. New York: Peter Lang, 2010; Lucky Per by Henrik Pontoppidan, translated from the Danish by Naomi Lebowitz, with an introduction by Garth Risk Hallberg. New York: Everyman's Library, Alfred A. Knopf, 2019.
- Murdoch, Iris. Living on Paper: Letters from Iris Murdoch. Ed. Avril Horner and Anne Rowe. Princeton: Princeton UP, 2015.
