= Mogens Ballin =

Danish artist and silversmith

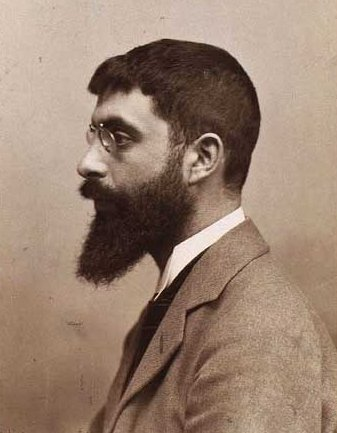
Mogens Ballin (c.1905)

Mogens Ballin (20 March 1871, Copenhagen – 27 January 1914, Hellerup) was a Danish artist, one of a group of painters who gathered in the Breton village of Pont-Aven. He later became a notable silversmith designing jewelry and lamps.

== Biography ==
Ballin came from a well-to-do Jewish family in Copenhagen. Of particular importance to his future were the French lessons he had with Paul Gauguin's wife, Mette, in Frederiksberg. Thanks to the works of Gauguin he saw in her apartment, he was able to follow the most important trends in French Impessionist art. In 1889, he went to Paris where he met Gauguin and his friends who together made up the Nabis group of artists.

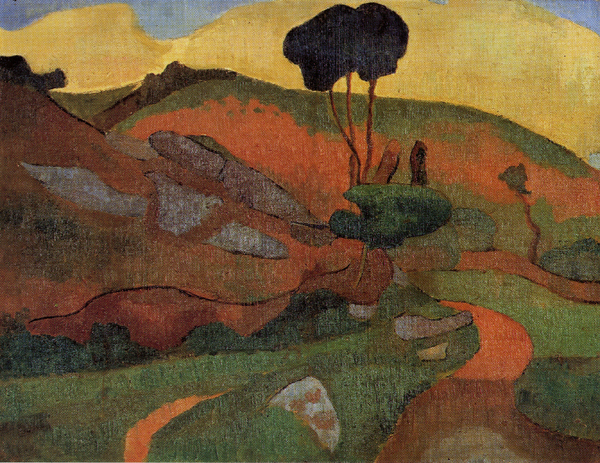
Landscape (c. 1892)

At a celebration for Gauguin in March 1891, he met the Dutch painter Jan Verkade who had a marked influence on the development of his career. The two young artists decided to go to Brittany together, staying at the Pension Gloanec in Pont-Aven. Later they joined Paul Sérusier in Huelgoat where they came into contact with Georges Rasetti (1889–1957). They also went to Le Pouldu where they completed a number of Synthetist landscapes under Sérusier's leadership. Together with Maxime Maufra and Charles Filiger, they hoped to embark on a new form of art. Though they were never able to achieve it, it was apparently an early attempt at abstract painting.

In May 1892, Ballin went to Saint-Nolff with Verkade, producing a number of small landscapes and many drawings. Later that year, he traveled to Italy where became a Roman Catholic, being baptized in Fiesole near Florence in January 1893. He then returned to Copenhagen where he supported religious ideals, contributing to the periodical Taarnet. Together with Verkade, he helped Johannes Jørgensen to achieve his breakthrough.

In 1899, he opened a workshop for metalwork together with Siegfried Wagner, finding inspiration from Willumsen and contributing to the Danish version of Jugentstil, in particular working with tin and silver and producing lamps and jewelry. His efforts provided inspiration for Georg Jensen and Just Andersen (1884–1943).

== Style of painting ==
Although Ballin did not produce many paintings, his work clearly played a role in developing the trends of the Nabi artists with his use of pure color, blue background tones, false perspective, and the high horizons in his landscapes. His portraits, influenced by Charles Filiger show his religious aspirations and latent mysticism. They have the appearance of modern Byzantine icons. In Paul Sérusier's words, "Ballin has an approach which is strange and serious, rich and fanciful."
