= Lucky Per =

Book by Henrik Pontoppidan

Lucky Per (Danish: Lykke-Per) is a novel by Danish Nobel Prize–winning author Henrik Pontoppidan published in eight volumes between 1898 and 1904. It is considered one of the major Danish novels, and in 2004 it was made part of the Danish Culture Canon.

The novel tells the story of Per Sidenius, a self-confident, richly gifted man who breaks with his religious family and the constraints of his heritage and social background in order to become an engineer. However, at the height of his success, they at last catch up with him and force him to give up his career, leaving him lonely. For the character of Per Sidenius, Pontoppidan drew on his own history as a Jutlandic vicar's son who traveled to Copenhagen to train as an engineer before becoming an author.

The novel was well received by German literati such as Thomas Mann, Georg Lukács, and Ernst Bloch, who considered it "a cosmopolitan masterpiece of epochal sweep and a profound social, psychological, and metaphysical anatomy of the modernist transition". While it had been translated into 11 languages before the end of the 20th century, the first English translation was published in 2010 by Naomi Lebowitz, titled "Lucky Per". A new translation by Irish author and translator Paul Larkin was published in October 2018 by the Museum Tusculanum Press. Larkin's translation, titled 'A Fortunate Man', is based on the 1905 version of Pontoppidan's text. Danish director Bille August's film adaptation of the novel is also called A Fortunate Man in its English language version and was released in the late summer of 2018.

A major theme of the story is the relation of "luck" to "happiness," as the Danish word lykke can mean both happiness as well as good luck or fortune. While Per initially considers happiness to be the result of success and the achievement of projects and goals in the mundane world, he eventually realizes that happiness can be achieved independently of the luck that leads to success. For Pontoppidan, Per's withdrawal from the bustling scene of Copenhagen is therefore not to be understood as defeat, but as a victory over the very circumstances that define his success.

== Plot ==
Peter Sidenius, often just called Per, is a young aspiring engineer from a devout Christian family in Western Denmark. His father is a stern man who expects that his sons will be priests like himself. He renounces his faith and travels to Copenhagen to study at the Polytechnic University and to achieve his personal objective of becoming "a conqueror". In doing so he cuts ties to his family.

In Copenhagen he comes into contact with the Modern as a revolutionary force in the form of the natural sciences and technology, but also the cosmopolitan and intellectual circles of the wealthy Jewish milieu in Copenhagen. He becomes a friend of the banker Philip Salomon, through whom he meets Philip's two daughters: Jakobe and Nanny. Per has a brief relationship with the younger daughter, Nanny, before he falls in love with the older daughter. Their relationship is motivated both by love and by the fact that the Salomon family are able to sponsor Peter's project. Jakobe is young and passionate and not inhibited by Per's Protestant sense of guilt at indulging in the pleasures of life – but Per is unable to set his own passions free. They are engaged for a while, but Per calls off the engagement, which marks the end of his relation with the Jewish family. Per also meets the charismatic Dr. Nathan, a fictionalized version of the intellectual Georg Brandes, who influences Per with his progressive ideals of bringing the future to Denmark. Although sympathetic, Per eventually rejects Dr. Nathan's influence, as he comes to see him as a representative of a purely humanistic intellectualism with no interest in science and technological progress.

Per conceives a large scale engineering project and plans the construction of a series of canals and harbor systems in his native Jutland, and starts lobbying for its construction with the political and academic establishment. When academia dismisses the idea as unfeasible, he nonetheless manages to gain support through his contacts in the bank world, the Salomon family, who turn out to be more progressive and are willing to financially support his project. Nonetheless the project eventually fails due to opposition from Per's enemies in the national-conservative circles, and Per's own inability to compromise.

Per returns to Jutland, where he again embraces his Christian roots for a while. He marries the daughter of a priest, Inger, and they have three children. In the end, he has to leave them too, when Peter realises that he treats his children the same way as his father did to him. He does so because he is afraid that he will damage them like his father did to him. He lives the last years of his life in ascetic contemplation in western Jutland while carrying out the dreary work of a civil servant. Just before his death, he reconciles with Jacobe and in his last will and testament, he donates his meager fortune to the charity work she has started since they last saw each other.

"When, in spite of all the good fortune that had come his way, he wasn’t happy, it was because he had not wanted to be happy in the general sense of the word."

== Film release ==
The novel was made into a Danish drama film called A Fortunate Man directed by Bille August in 2018.

== Works cited ==
- "Sindets landskaber – Lykke-Per". Den Store Danske Encyklopædi. Gyldendal. 2013.
- Albert, Judith Strong (2012). "Henrik Pontoppidan. Lucky Per. Translated from the Danish with Notes and Afterword by Naomi Lebowitz [REVIEW]". Women's Studies. 41 (5).
- Lebowitz, Naomi (2006). "The World's Pontoppidan and His Lykke Per". Scandinavian Studies. 78 (1): 43–70.
- Pontoppidan, Henrik (2010). Lucky Per. Naomi Lebowitz (trans). Peter Lang.
- "Kulturkanon", PDF Copy of the Website from 2006 (in Danish)
- Jameson, Fredric (October 20, 2011). "Cosmic Neutrality". London Review of Books. 33 (20): 17–18.
