= Amalievej =

Street in Copenhagen, Denmark

Amalievej is a street in the Frederiksberg district of Copenhagen, Denmark, linking Bülowsvej in the west with H. C. Ørsteds Vej in the east. The western end of the street is lined with large late 19th-century villas while its eastern end is dominated by taller buildings.

== History ==
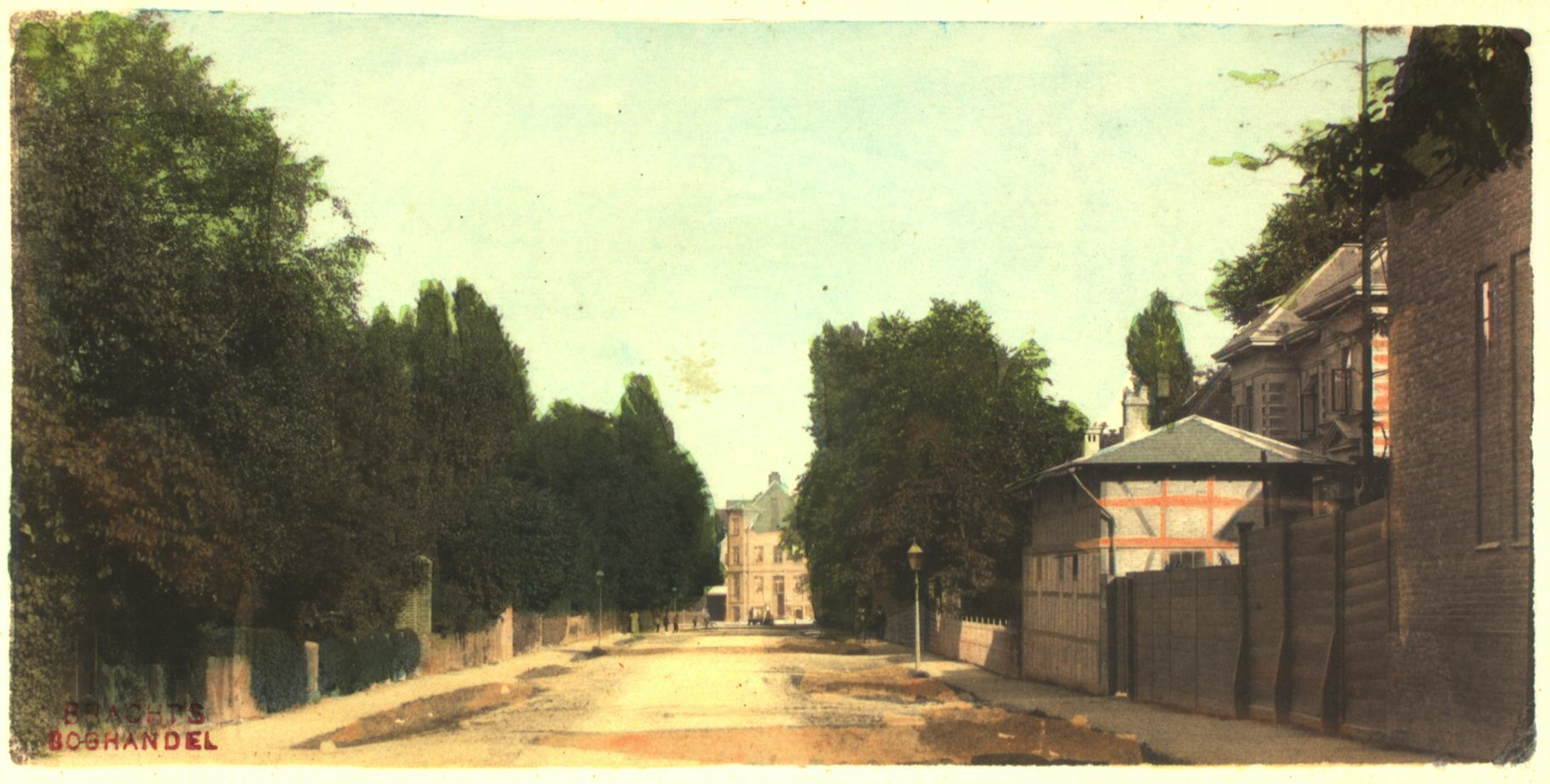
Amalievej, 1899

The street was constructed by Frederik Bülow in approximately 1852 as one of the first streets in a new neighbourhood of single family detached homes. The street was initially called Amaliegade but the name was changed to Amalievej to avoid confusion with Amaliegade in Copenhagen. It was named after Amalie Dohlmann, a daughter of the owner of nearby SvanemosegårdFrits August Dohlmann. Her sister was the painter Augusta Dohlmann. Svanemosegård was located on Bülowsvej and the Dohlmann family were personal friends of Frederik Bülow.

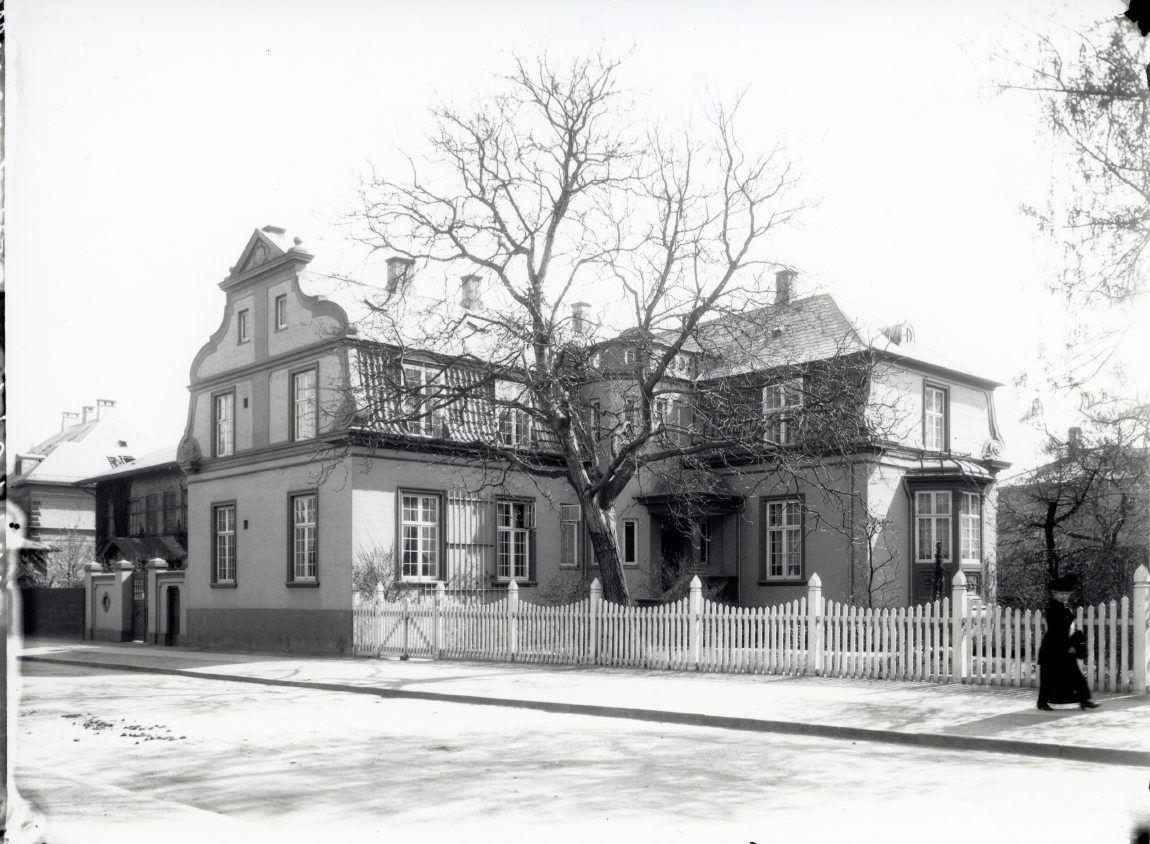
Sylvester Hvid's Villa, 1019

Defense Minister Carl Lundbyee lived in the house at No. 4 from 1857 to 1873. The artist Constantin Hansen lived in the house at No. 6 in 1862–80. His house, Paletten, has been replaced by the apartment building at No. 10. Tage Iversen operated a private medical clinic in No. 6-8. Princess Elisabeth was born at the site.

== Notable buildings ==
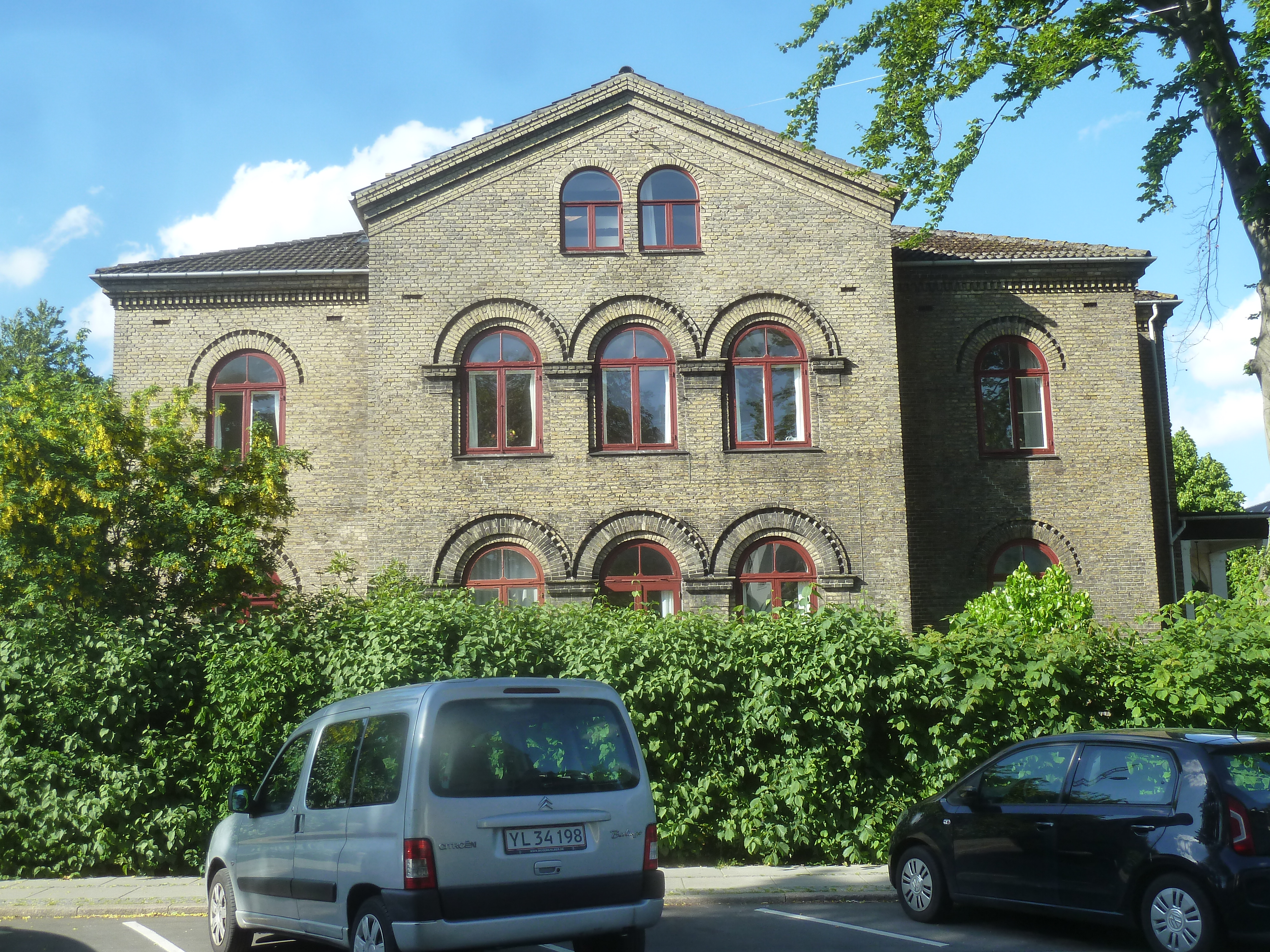
No. 1 : Jens Eckersberg's house

The house at No. 1 was built by architect Jens Eckersberg for his own use. Several of the houses in the street are listed with a SAVE value of 4 in the Danish Cultural Agency's Registry of Protected Buildings and Places, including No. 4 (1858) and No. 8 (1896).

A half-timbered horse stable at No. 4 has survived. Billes Skole, a former school, is located at No. 20.
