= Henrik Pontoppidan =

Danish writer, Nobel Laureate

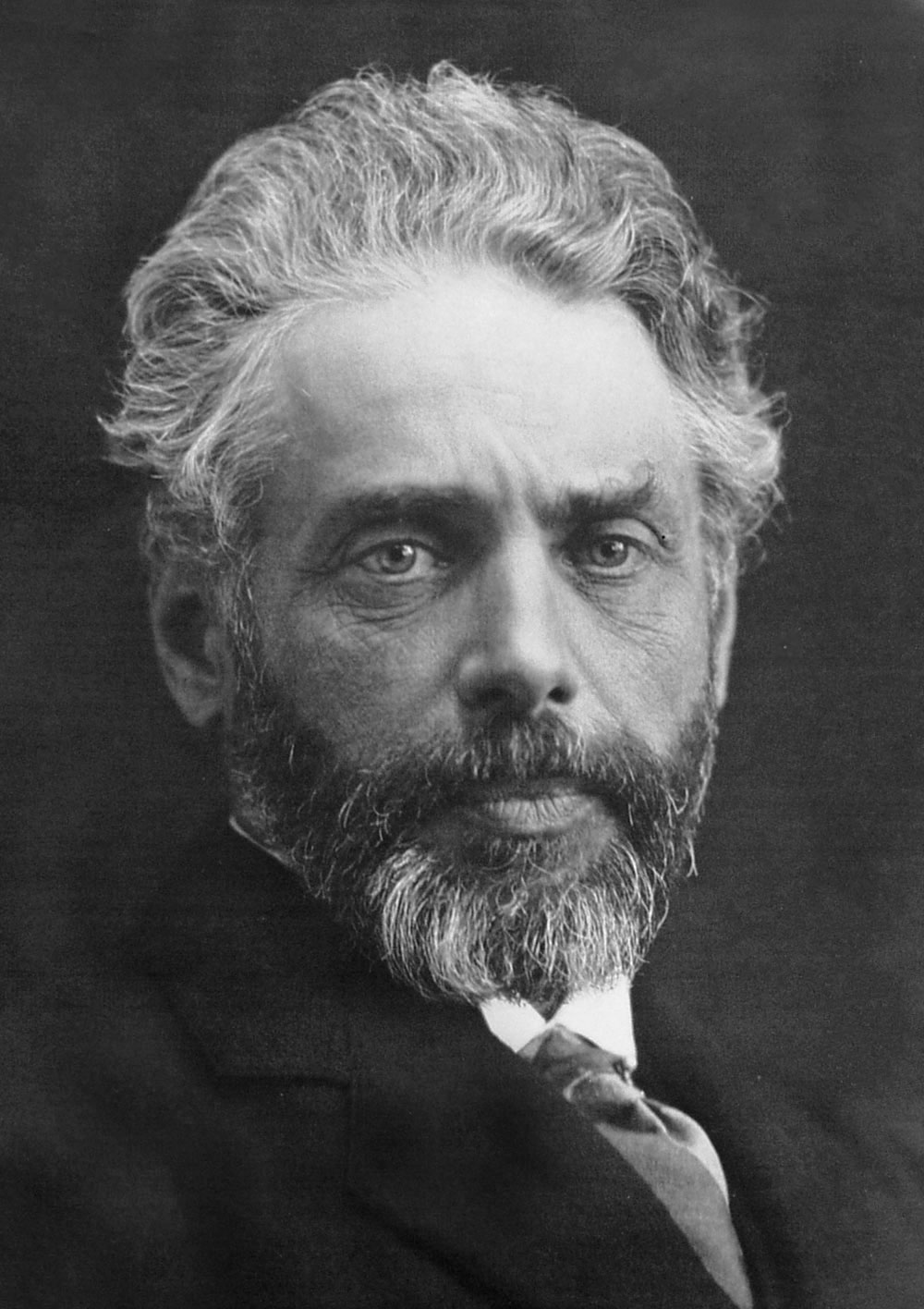
- Pontoppidan c. 1913
- Born: 24 July 1857; Fredericia, Denmark
- Died: 21 August 1943 (aged 86); Charlottenlund, Denmark
- Writing career
- Genre: Realist writer
- Notable awards: Nobel Prize in Literature; 1917 shared with Karl Gjellerup

Henrik Pontoppidan (Danish: [ˈhenˀʁek pʰʌnˈtsʰʌpitæn]; 24 July 1857 – 21 August 1943) was a Danish realist writer who shared with Karl Gjellerup the Nobel Prize for Literature in 1917 for "his authentic descriptions of present-day life in Denmark." Pontoppidan's novels and short stories — informed with a desire for social progress but despairing, later in his life, of its realization — present an unusually comprehensive picture of his country and his epoch. As a writer he was an interesting figure, distancing himself both from the conservative environment in which he was brought up and from his socialist contemporaries and friends. He was the youngest and in many ways the most original and influential member of the Modern Break-Through.

== Early life and career ==
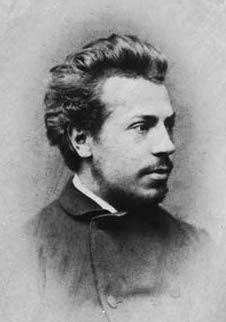
Pontoppidan c. 1874

The son of a Jutlandic vicar and belonging to an old family of vicars and writers, Pontoppidan gave up an education as an engineer, worked as a primary school teacher and finally became a freelance journalist and full-time writer, making his debut in 1881.

The first phase of his work constitutes rebellious social criticism, and as such was also a revolt against his own privileged family background. In a famous quote, Henrik Pontoppidan mocked the historic latinisation of his own surname Pontoppidan from its original Danish root Broby.

In matter-of-fact short stories, he mercilessly describes the life of the peasants and country proletarians, with whom he lived in close contact. He was perhaps the first Danish progressive writer to break with an idealised portrayal of farmers. The tales from this era are collected in Landsbybilleder ("Village Pictures", 1883) and Fra Hytterne ("From the Huts", 1887). An important part is his 1890 political collection of short stories Skyer ("Clouds"), a biting description of Denmark under the authoritarian semi-dictatorship of the Conservatives both condemning the oppressors and scorning the Danes’ lack of disaffection. After this period he increasingly concentrated on psychological and naturalist problems without giving up his social engagement. Pontoppidan's 1889 review "Messias" and 1890 piece "Den gamle Adam" were anonymously published and triggered a controversy after being denounced as blasphemous. The publisher, newspaper editor Ernst Brandes, was fined 300 kroner for "Messias" in December 1891 and committed suicide in 1892.

== Family ==
His first wife was Mette Marie Hansen, a woman from a farming family in northern Zealand, with whom he had three children, one of whom died at a young age. The couple separated in 1889, after Pontoppidan met Antoinette Caroline Elise Kofoed. He married Kofoed in 1892, and they had a daughter and a son. Kofoed, who struggled with poor health, died in 1928. Pontoppidan had to provide for two families, which presented many difficulties. Both of his sons emigrated, one to the U.S. and one to Brazil.

== Main works ==
The three novels that are normally considered to be Pontoppidan's main works were written from about 1890 to 1920. In these works he established a Danish version of the "broad description of society" novel in the tradition of Balzac and Zola. Centred on a hero, he paints a picture of Denmark in the era of the Constitutional Struggle between Conservative and Liberals, rising industrialisation, cultural conflicts and awakening revolutionary movements.

- Det forjættede Land (I-III 1891–95, English translation of vol. I-II The Promised Land 1896), describes a fantasist and his dream of being a preacher in the country which leads to self-deception and insanity.
- The partly autobiographical Lykke-Per (1898–1904) (Lucky Per), perhaps his most famous novel, deals with the self-confident, richly gifted man who breaks with his religious family in order to be an engineer and a conqueror, free of heritage and milieu. However, at the height of his success, they at last catch up with him and he gives up his career to find himself in solitude.
- The bitter De dødes Rige (1912–16, "The Realm of the Dead") shows Denmark after the apparent victory of democracy in 1901, a society in which political ideals are mouldering, capitalism is marching on, and press and art are prostituted, all centred about the hopeless love and reform plans of a young progressive squire afflicted by illness.

== Other works ==
Pontoppidan's last large novel Mands Himmerig (1927, "Man’s Heaven") is an almost desperate description of the crisis of a Danish intellectual at the time of the outbreak of World War I.

Pontoppidan also wrote many short novels and long tales in which he discussed political, psychological and sexual themes.

Isbjørnen (1887, "The Polar Bear") describes the confrontation between an outspoken vicar from Greenland and his narrow-minded Danish provincial clergymen. Translated by Paul Larkin as The White Bear. New York Review Books, 2025.

Mimoser (1886, Engl. transl. The Apothecary’s Daughters, 1890) is an ironic-tragic tale about the exaggerated intolerance of unfaithfulness.

Nattevagt (1894, "Night Watch") deals with a courageous and revolutionary artist who is nevertheless a frustrated failure as a husband. Pontoppidan drew on the life of his friend the painter L. A. Ring for the portrait of the artist Thorkild Drehling, Ring considered it a betrayal of trust and broke off the friendship.

Den gamle Adam (1894, "The Old Adam") deals with both men's fear of women and of sexuality as a whole.

Ørneflugt (1899, "Eagles flight") is a direct commentary on Hans Christian Andersens The Ugly Duckling with the opposite morale. An eagle brought up in a barnyard grows fat and eventually dies crashlanding into a dungpile - the morale being that you may very well have been born in an eagle's egg but that won't matter if you're brought up in a barnyard.

"Borgmester Hoeck og Hustru" (1905, Engl. transl. Burgomaster Hoeck and His Wife, 1999) portrays a tragic marriage dominated by the husband's jealousy and dislike of his wife's joy in life.

A central theme in most of these tales is the difficulties of handling the new tolerance, open-mindedness and democratisation which are introduced by both the transition of society and by literature. Another theme is the conflict between the introverted and closed male nature and the vitality of the woman. Behind all this lies the classic naturalist theme of heritage and milieu against which man has to rebel without quite denying their existence. In his later works he sometimes seems to become a mixture of a castigator of society and a prophet of doom.

Between 1933 and 1943 Pontoppidan wrote two different versions of his Memoirs, in which he tried to define his own view of his personal development. Though handicapped by blindness and deafness in later life, he continued to take an interest in politics and cultural life until his final years.

== Literary and cultural influence ==
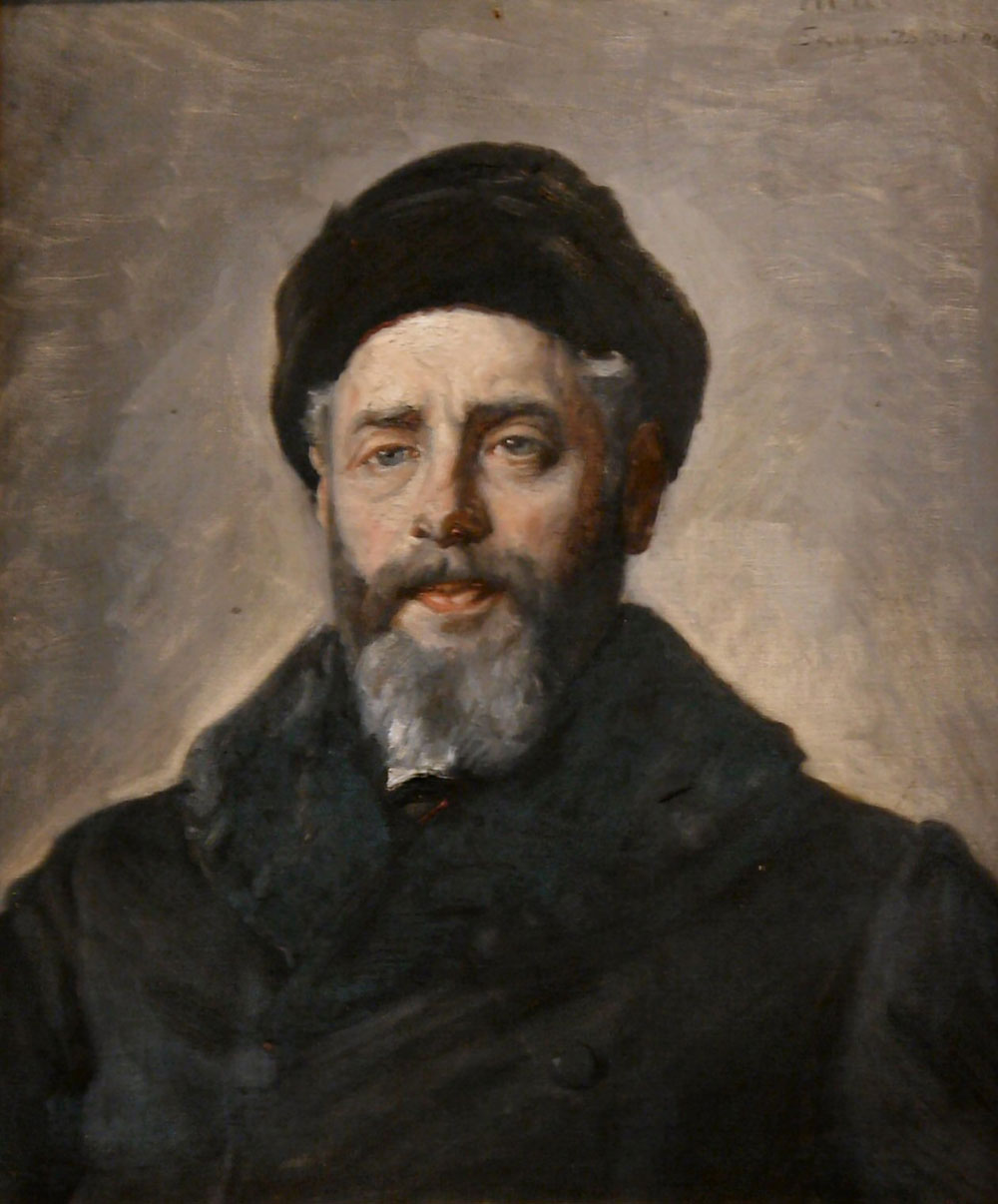
Portrait of Pontoppidan by Michael Ancher (1908)

As a stylist Pontoppidan has been described a naturalist. He wrote in plain language loaded with symbols and hidden hints and irony. He often revised previous works, simplifying them, changing their plot or sharpening their attitude.

Pontoppidan is one of the most discussed modern Danish writers. This is partly because of his personal character. Pontoppidan was a man of many paradoxes: a clear liberal in his time, but a stern patriot, an anti-clerical puritan, a disillusioned fighting nature, collaborating with socialists but always from an independent and individualist position. It is also partly due to his style which has often been regarded as ambiguous and impenetrable; his mixture of partiality and objectivity has often confused both readers and critics and in fact liberals, radicals, conservatives, right wingers and socialists have all tried to reflect their own ideals in his works. He has been regarded both as the absolute antagonist of Georg Brandes and as his most congenial pupil.

Among all the authors of the Modern Break-Through, Pontoppidan is probably the most influential and longest living. His social critical writings mark him as a pioneer of 20th Century Danish literature. Cultural conservatives have been inspired by his critique of modernism after World War I. Finally, he set a standard of "novels about society" which remains relevant. Surprisingly, as a Nobel Prize winner of some international renown, contemporary English translations of his novels had been unavailable before the 2010 publication of Lucky Per in a translation by Naomi Lebowitz, republished in 2019 in the Everyman's Library Contemporary Classics series.

== English translations ==
- The Apothecary's Daughters (original title: Mimoser, novel), trans. Gordius Nielsen (Trübner & Co., 1889)
- Emanuel, or Children of the Soil (original title: Muld, novel), trans. Mrs. Edgar Lucas (J. M. Dent, 1896). from Archive.org
- The Promised Land (original title: Det forjættede Land, novel), partial trans. Mrs. Edgar Lucas (J. M. Dent, 1896).
- Lucky Per (original title: Lykke-Per, novel), trans. Naomi Lebowitz (Peter Lang, 2010).
- A Fortunate Man (original title: Lykke-Per, novel), trans. Paul Larkin (Museum Tusculanum Press, 2018; New York Review Books, 2025)
- The White Bear followed by The Rear Guard (Isbjørnen and Nattevagt), trans. Paul Larkin (New York Review Books, 2025)
