= Sophus Claussen =

Danish writer (1865–1931)

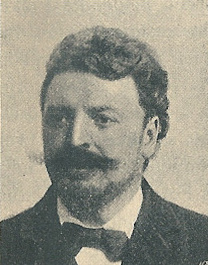
- Born: 12 September 1865; Helletofte
- Died: 11 April 1931 (aged 65); Gentofte
- Burial place: Gentofte cemetery
- Occupation: writer
- Known for: neo-romanticism poems
- Parents: Rasmus Claussen (father); Hanne Sophie (nee Henriksen) (mother)

Sophus Claussen (12 September 1865 Helletofte – 11 April 1931 Gentofte) was a Danish writer. He is best remembered for his neo-romanticism poems.

== Biography ==
Born in 1865, Claussen was the son of politician Rasmus Claussen and Hanne Sophie (née Henriksen). He began his studies in 1884 and published his first collection of poetry, Naturbørn, which attracted attention due to its daringness and bold eroticism along the lines of Emil Aarestrup's work. For a number of years Claussen was involved with the local press. He first began to make a name for himself through two partially symbolic, partially realistic idylls about life in market towns, "Unge Bander" (1894) and "Kitty" (1895), which through a blend of prose and poetry as well as playfulness and grace captivated readers (particularly his introduction to "Unge Bander": "Frøken Regnvejr", likely his most significant work [revised edition 1912]). Claussen later continued his depictions of Danish island life in "Pilefløjter" (1899) and "Mellem to Kyster" (1900). His small travel novels "Valfart" and "Antonius i Paris" (both 1896) are unique among his works with their poetically chatty tone. Additionally, he wrote the play "Arbejdersken".

Claussen lived in Paris for a number of years and published several smaller books ("Trefoden" [1901], "Djævlerier" [1904], "Eroter og Fauner" [1910]). After returning to Denmark, he published a comprehensive and characteristic collection of poetry, Danske Vers, which defines the capricious nature of his body of work.

Among his later works, "Heroica" (1925) and "Foraarstaler" (1927) can be highlighted as particularly representative of his poetic nature. Claussen's complete works are available in nine volumes.

Claussen and author Johannes Jørgensen co-wrote the journal Taarnet as part of the Danish Symbolism movement. To Claussen's regret, he never had a big breakthrough. Recognition eventually came among the Heretica circle and author Karen Blixen.

Claussen was closely linked with painter Albert Gottschalk.

He is buried in Gentofte cemetery.

== Honors ==
Ekbatana, from 1896, is included in the Danish culture canon.

== Works ==
- Naturbørn, 1887
- Pilefløjter 1899
- Ungt Folk 1894
- Djævlerier, 1904
- Danske Vers, 1912
- Heroica 1925
