= Taarnet =

Danish arts and literary magazine (1893–1894)

- Editor: Johannes Jørgensen
- Categories: Literary magazine; Arts magazine
- Frequency: Monthly
- Founder: Johannes Jørgensen
- Founded: 1893
- First issue: October 1893
- Final issue: September 1894
- Country: Denmark
- Based in: Copenhagen
- Language: Danish

Taarnet (Danish: The Tower) was a monthly art and literary magazine founded and edited by Johannes Jørgensen in Copenhagen, Denmark. It was subtitled as Illustreret Tidsskrift for Kunst og Litteratur (Danish: Illustrated Magazine for Arts and Literature). The magazine was one of the early avant-garde publications and the major representative of symbolism in Denmark. It existed for one year between 1893 and 1894.

== History and profile ==
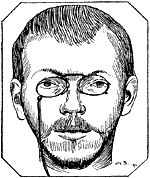
Johannes Jørgensen, founder and editor of Taarnet

Taarnet was founded in 1893 by Johannes Jørgensen who formulated his symbolism approach in the publication. The title of the magazine was a reference to both the poetic meaning of tower and the tower in Jørgensen's apartment in Frederiksberg, Copenhagen. In his autobiography Jørgensen stated that Taarnet was established in the name of Edgar Allan Poe, Charles Baudelaire and Paul Verlaine. The first issue appeared in October 1893. The magazine which was published on a monthly basis featured articles on Danish and international symbolist literature and visual art.

As stated above Jørgensen described his own version of symbolism in Taarnet and argued "all genuine art is and becomes symbolic." Furthermore, in the magazine Jørgensen replied the critics of his manifesto that he had published in another Danish magazine, Tilskueren. The mission of Taarnet was to provide a connection between French and Danish symbolism, and nearly twenty percent of all articles published in the magazine were translations of French symbolists.

In his articles Jørgensen also supported more mystical and spiritual ways of life. Another notable contributor of the monthly was Sophus Claussen. Danish writer Viggo Stuckenberg published the first scene of his play Den vilde Jæger in the magazine which also featured early drawings by Svend Hammershøi. Other major Danish writers associated with the magazine were Sophus Michaëlis, Mogens Ballin and Jens Ferdinand Willumsen.

Taarnet folded in September 1894 after producing nine issues.
