= Johannes Jørgensen =

Danish writer (1866–1956)

Jens Johannes Jørgensen
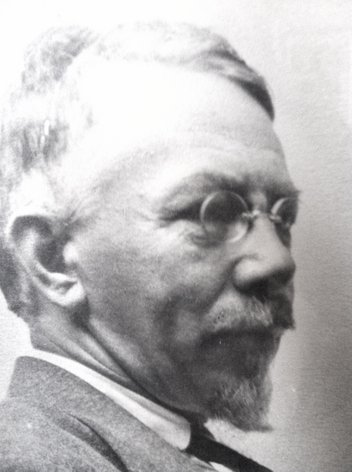
- Jørgensen about 1925
- Born: 6 November 1866; Svendborg, Denmark
- Died: 29 May 1956 (aged 89); Svendborg, Denmark
- Occupation: Writer

Jens Johannes Jørgensen (6 November 1866, in Svendborg – 29 May 1956) was a Danish writer, best known for his biographies of Catholic saints. He was nominated for the Nobel Prize in Literature five times.

== Early days ==
Johannes Jørgensen was born in 1866 in Svendborg, Denmark. In 1884, he travelled to Copenhagen to start his studies, but he quit his studies in 1888. In Copenhagen he began to develop radical social views, which soon led him into a circle of cultural and radical artists.

He was fascinated by the Russian nihilists and by Georg Brandes who boasted of dispelling "the darkness of Christianity." He led a life of pleasure and married, but his happiness did not last. New voices announcing spiritual values were then being heard in Denmark. Jørgensen read Joris-Karl Huysmans, Maurice Maeterlinck and others. He broke with Georg Brandes and his school, which would later cause his ruin.

== The young poet ==
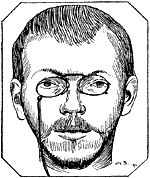
Johannes Jørgensen by Mogens Ballin, 1894

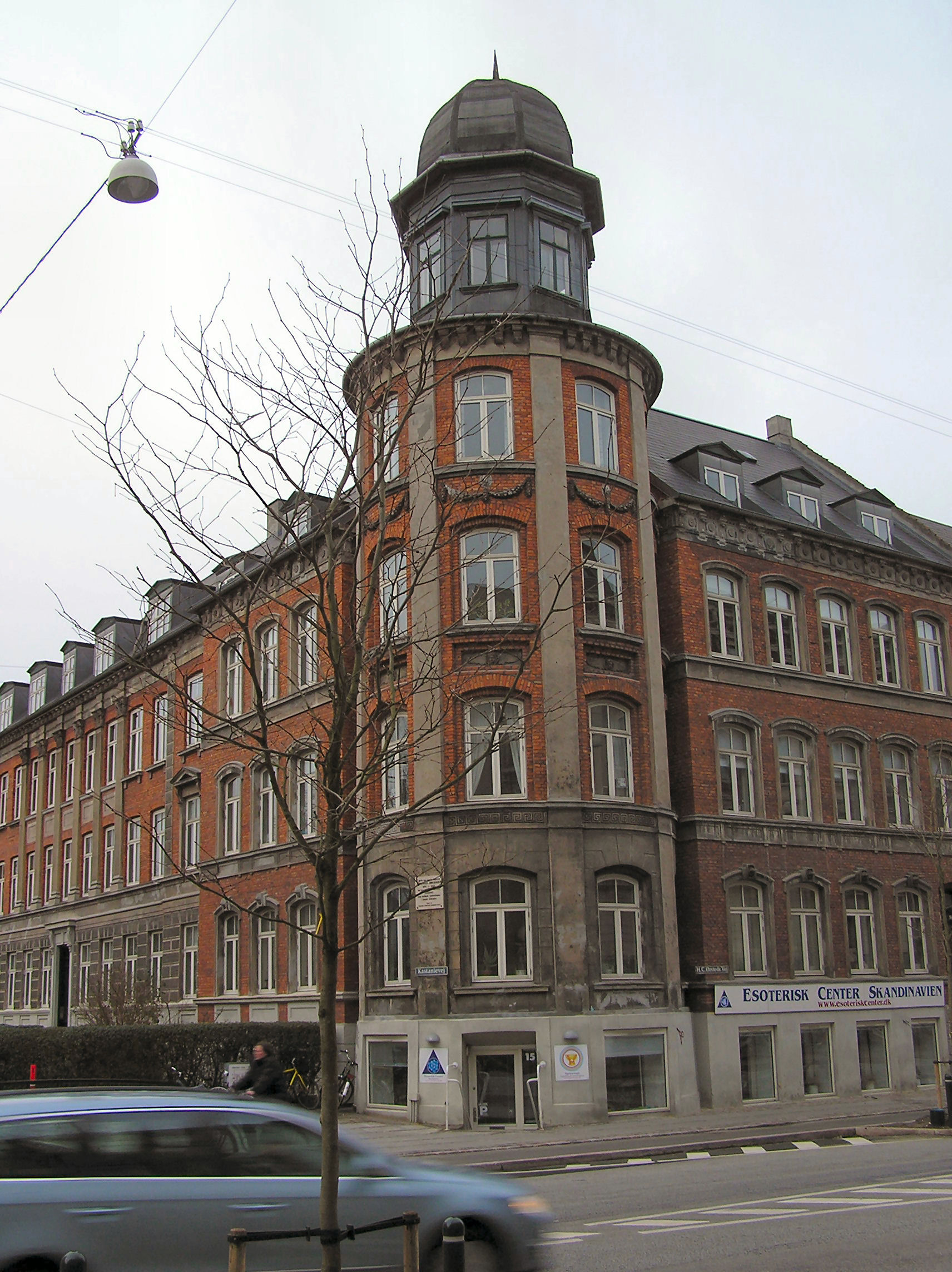
The house with tower in Frederiksberg, from journal The Tower got its name.

From his earliest years, he had shown a strong love of poetry through which he could express his dreams and observations. For the rest of his life, poetry remained one of his more prominent modes of expression.

But with his innate melancholy temperament, he found no permanent place in cultural radicalism and materialism, where Eros and connoisseur, summarized in pantheism's worship of nature was prevalent. Therefore, he began a quest for more spiritually motivated sources of inspiration together with other like-minded people. As an editor of the magazine Taarnet (The Tower in English) in the years 1893–94, he had an outlet for expressing his ideas about symbolism, and his opposition to naturalism. Before his magazine Taarnet Jørgensen published a manifesto on his understanding of symbolism in another Danish magazine Tilskueren.

Symbolists quickly came across the prevailing literary circles, in particular, the brothers Georg and Edvard Brandes, who did not spare the young rebels.

Johannes Jørgensen then met a young Jewish silversmith, Mogens Ballin, who had converted to Catholicism. He had not reached the spiritual depth he had sought. From his childhood home he had inherited an entrenched base of Christianity, and even at his most radical period this base never quite left him. It now returned in the form of mysticism. It took a long time with many internal battles before he found the port of spiritual comfort, though many internal and external factors constantly tore at him.

== Conversion to the Catholic Church ==
In 1894 Jørgensen (together with Mogens Ballin) first visited the Basilica of San Francesco d'Assisi. It was the beginning of what would come to fill most of his future life as both man and writer – namely the love of the Holy St. Francis, Assisi's famous son who was born here and worked here until he died in 1226. The close friendship with Mogens Ballin and visiting the Basilica of St. Francis led to his conversion to Catholicism in 1896, a crucial turning point in his writing.

== World war one ==
In 1915 Johannes Jørgensen published the documentary novel Klokke Roland. In Denmark Klokke Roland went into 21 printings and the book was published in both French and English in 1916 (La Cloche Roland, False Witness). The book describes the German invasion of Belgium in 1914. This was, according to Jørgensen, a heinous act with bloody and cruel consequences for the Belgian people. The publication created outrage among the German authorities and led to diplomatic tensions between Denmark and Germany. Things escalated to a point where the Germans demanded legal action be brought against Jørgensen and the daily newspaper Politiken, which had published a positive review of the book. The case was a delicate one for Danish authorities, who went to great lengths not to provoke a German invasion.

== Saint biographies ==
In 1907 Jørgensen finished his biography of St. Francis, a book which would make him famous and an honorary citizen both in Assisi and later also in his native town of Svendborg. He had previously worked with the saint from Assisi. In 1902, he had translated Fioretti into Danish, and the following year he had published a book with the Pilgrim's depiction of the Franciscan sites.

The Franciscan spirituality came to dominate his thoughts. In 1915, settled in Assisi, only interrupted by the war years 1943–1945 when he traveled to Vadstena, Sweden to live and begin his great work on St. Birgitta. It was his third major biography of saints, following the book of St. Catherine of Siena (1915). His embracing of the Franciscan spirit led to a series of books based on the Umbrian world where spirit and nature always led to a higher unity.

Johannes Jørgensen's life had had an almost sentimental affinity to nature, seasons, flowers and life's affirmative diversity. This had developed into a pantheistic natural worship in his youth. But in the depiction of St. Francis's relationship with nature as God's true image, the two passion within him merged – nature and God. The deity who in his youth was the human relationship to nature now turned into an expression of God's truth.

== Home to Denmark ==
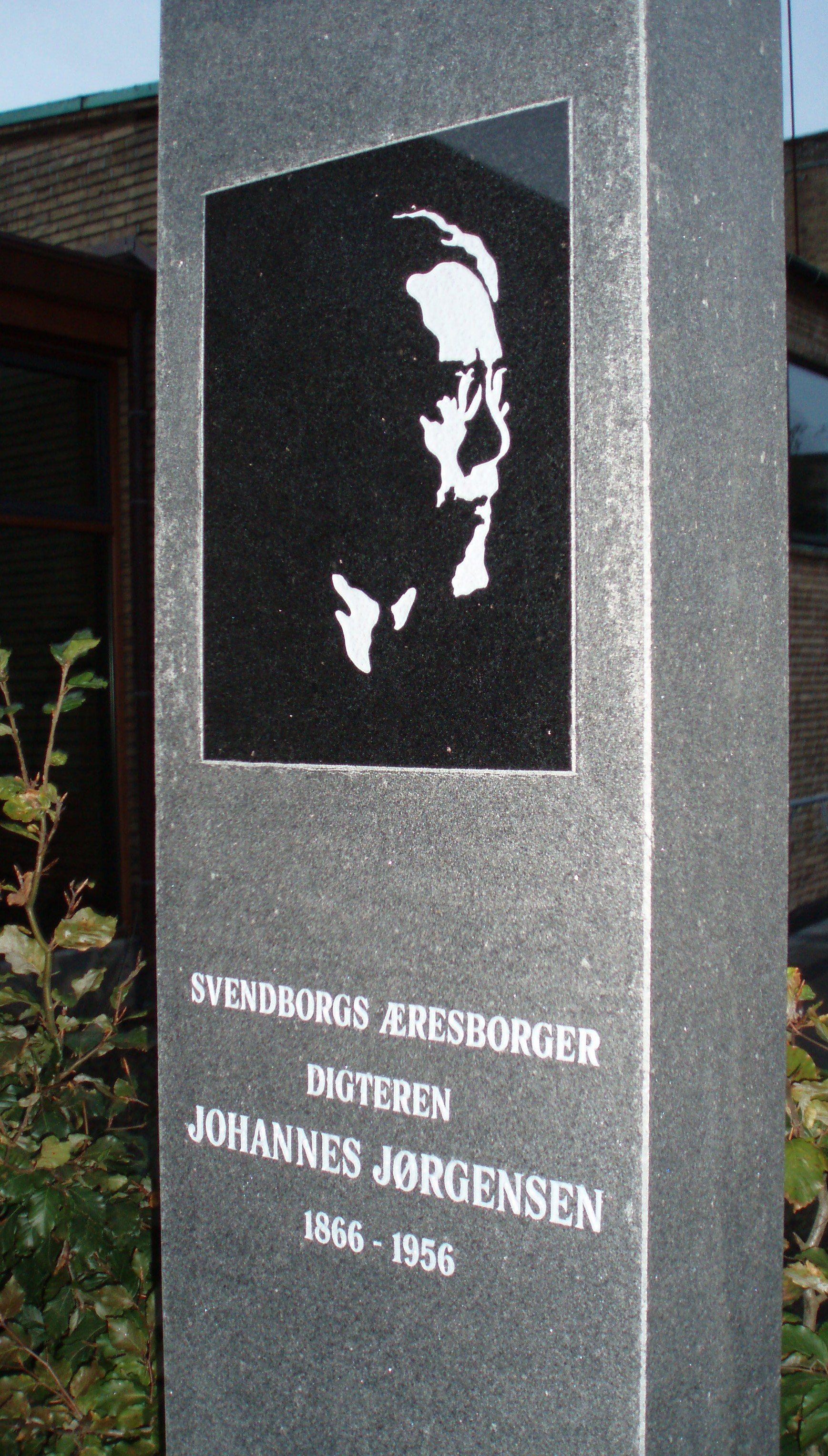
At the 50-year anniversary of Johannes Jørgensen's death in 2006 a memorial was erected in Svendborg for the city's honorary citizen.

After the war ended he returned to Assisi, but age was starting to weigh him down. In 1952 he moved back to Svendborg, where the city offered him free honorary residence in his childhood home of Lady Alley.

In 1913 he left his wife, Amalie F. Ewald and their seven children after an increasingly problematic marriage. As a Catholic he could not remarry, but when Amalie died in 1935, he married (in 1937) the Austrian-born Helen Klein.

He became an honorary citizen of Assisi 1922 and in Svendborg 1936 and dr. phil. hc ved Universitetet i Louvain 1927. Moreover, he was made Knight of the Dannebrog in 1920 and Commander of the 2nd grade 1926. degree 1926.

Johannes Jørgensen died on 29 May 1956, almost 90 years old. He was buried at the city cemetery.

== Pictorial representations ==
- Portrait painting by Johan Rohde, 1922 (Frederiksborg Castle) and Johannes Nielsen, 1937.
- Bust of Chresten Skikkild, 1926 in County Library in Svendborg.
- Drawings by Ragnvald Blix, 1904; Andrée Carof, 1915; Paolo Ghiglia, 1924; and Gerda Ploug Sarp.
- Woodcuts by Hans Olsen 1897 .

== Kaj Munk ==
Following the murder of Kaj Munk on 4 January 1944, the Danish resistance newspaper De frie Danske brought condemning reactions from influential Scandinavians, including Jørgensen.

== Works ==
Among his works are:

- A Stranger – novel, 1890
- Moods – poems, 1892
- Summer – novel, 1892
- Confession – poems, 1894
- Homesickness – novel, 1894
- Pilgrim Book – travelogue, 1903
- St. Francis of Assisi – Biography, 1907

In the 18th edition of the Danish Folk High School Songbook, there are three poems by John Jørgensen: Francis of Assisi Solsang "Almighty and dear God", "Now lit foliage in forests" and "Lay down your head, you blossom".
