= List of Icelandic artists =

Art has existed in Iceland since the first settlements, but it was only at the beginning of the 20th century that Icelandic artists came to an international reputation. Mostly, they had studied in other countries, e.g. in Denmark.

The most important motifs for Icelandic painters were the nature of their home country and the human being, but they also used mythical and supernatural themes as well as socio-realistic motives.

Around 1960 the Swiss-German artist Dieter Roth moved to Iceland. His engagement with the Icelandic art scene was of great importance in introducing movements such as conceptual art, Fluxus, happenings, body art, life art and social sculpture, which since have formed a basis for Icelandic Contemporary Art.

== Painters ==
- Ásgrímur Jónsson (1876–1958)
- Jóhannes Geir Jónsson (1927–2003)
- Jóhannes Sveinsson Kjarval (1885–1972)
- Þórarinn Þorláksson (1867–1924)
- Jón Stefánsson (1881–1962)
- Einar Jónsson (1863–1922)
- Guðmundur Thorsteinsson (1891–1924)
- Gunnlaugur Scheving (1904–1972)
- Þorvaldur Skúlason (1906–1984)
- Karl Kvaran (1924–1989)
- Svavar Guðnason (1909–1988)
- Nína Tryggvadóttir (1913–1968)
- Louisa Matthíasdóttir (1917–2000)
- Erró (Guðmundur Guðmundson, born 1932)
- Bjarni Jónsson (artist) (1934–2008)
- Haukur Halldórsson (born 1937)
- Einar Hákonarson (born 1945)
- Jón Óskar Hafsteinsson (born 1954)
- Brian Pilkington (born 1950)

== Contemporary artists ==
- Heimir Björgúlfsson (born 1975)
- Gabríela Fridriksdóttir (born 1971)
- Kristján Guðmundsson (born 1941)
- Gunnhildur Hauksdóttir (born 1972)
- Ragnar Kjartansson (born 1976)
- Steina Vasulka (born Steinunn Briem Bjarnadottir in 1940)
- Hugleikur Dagsson (born in 1977)
- Sigurður Guðjónsson (born 1975)
- Erla S. Haraldsdóttir (born 1967)

== Sculptors ==
- Ólafur Elíasson (born 1967, Danish–Icelandic)
- Johann Eyfells (1923–2019)
- Páll Guðmundsson (born 1959)
- Gerður Helgadóttir (1928–1975)
- Gunnfríður Jónsdóttir (1889–1968)
- Einar Jónsson (1874–1954)
- Ríkharður Jónsson (1888–1977)
- Sigurjón Ólafsson (1908–1982)
- Þorbjörg Pálsdóttir (1915–2009)
- Nína Sæmundsson (1892–1965)
- Katrín Sigurdardóttir (born 1967)
- Ásmundur Sveinsson (1893–1982)
- Steinunn Thorarinsdottir (born 1955)

== Photographers ==
- Ragnar Axelsson (RAX)
- Sigfús Eymundsson (1837–1911)
- Rebekka Guðleifsdóttir (born 1978)

== Architects ==
- Guðjón Samúelsson (1887–1950)
- Gísli Halldórsson (1914–1998)

== Actors ==
- Anita Briem
- Baltasar Kormákur
- Edda Björgvinsdóttir
- Heida Reed
- Hera Hilmar
- Hilmir Snær Guðnason
- Ingvar E. Sigurðsson
- Magnús Scheving
- Stefán Karl Stefánsson
- Steinunn Ólína Þorsteinsdóttir
- Tómas Lemarquis
