= Æsa Sigurjónsdóttir =

Icelander art curator

- Born: 23 September 1959 (age 66); Iceland
- Education: Paris Panthéon-Sorbonne, art history University of Iceland, history
- Occupations: Art curator Chairman of the Art Museum of the University of Iceland professor of art history and theory, University of Iceland
- Website: starfsfolk.hi.is/en/simaskra/4408

Æsa Sigurjónsdóttir (born 23 September 1959 in Reykjavík) is an Icelander art curator. She specializes in contemporary art, photography, history of photography and fashion. She is full professor of art history and art theory at the University of Iceland.

== Career and works ==
Æsa Sigurjónsdóttir began her career as an independent researcher and free-lance curator. She became an assistant professor in Art history at the University of Iceland in 2008.

She has written extensively on modern and contemporary art, photography, history of photography, and fashion, and has been the curator for several exhibitions related to Icelandic art in various European countries.

She has been chairman of board of the University of Iceland Art Museum since 2015.

She received the Fjöruverðlaunin price in 2009 in the category "Best non-fiction".

=== Books and major articles ===
- Transmettre l’art – Figures et méthodes – Quelle histoire ? Paris: Les presses du reel, 2013
- "The New Nordic Cool: Björk, Icelandic Fashion, and Art Today" in Fashion Theory, 2011
- "Nation, nature, reality". The history of art in Iceland from late 19th century to the beginning of the 21st century, Vol 2, National Museum of Iceland, 2011
- Icelandic Art Today, Ostfildern: Hatje Cantz, 2009

=== Curator and co-curator ===
- Feckless and Hotheaded, Galerie Raum mit Licht, Vienna, 2016 -
- Marginalia – texts, sketches, and doodles in Kjarval's art, Reykjavik Art Museum, 2015
- Re-construction of Friendship, Corner House, Riga European Capital of Culture, 2014
- Tracks in Sand, retrospective of sculptor Sigurjón Ólafsson, National Gallery Iceland, 2014
- FNAGP (Fondation Nationale des Arts Graphiques et Plastiques), Paris, 2014
- Reality Check, Reykjavík Art Festival 2010
- Dreams of the Sublime in Contemporary Icelandic Art in Bozar, Brussels and Reykjavik Art Museum 2008

She has worked with a number of artists including Anne Herzog, Bryndís Snæbjörnsdóttir & Mark Wilson, Halldór Ásgeirsson, Icelandic Love Corporation, Kristleifur Björnsson, Olga Bergmann, Ólöf Nordal, Pétur Thomsen, Sigurður Guðmundson, Sigurður Guðjónsson, Hlynur Hállsson Spessi, et al.

== See also ==
- Culture of Iceland
- List of Icelandic artists
- Center for Icelandic Art
- National Gallery of Iceland
- National Museum of Iceland
- SEQUENCES real-time art festival
