= The Sun Voyager =

Public sculpture in Iceland

Coordinates: 64°8′51.35″N 21°55′20.32″W

- The Sun Voyager sculpture
- Artist: Jón Gunnar Árnason (1931–1989)
- Year: 1990
- Medium: Stainless steel on granite
- Dimensions: 9 m × 7 m × 18 m (29.5 ft × 22.9 ft × 59 ft)
- Location: Sæbraut, Reykjavík, Iceland

The Sun Voyager (Icelandic: Sólfar [ˈsouːlˌfaːr̥]) is a sculpture by Jón Gunnar Árnason, located next to the Sæbraut road in Reykjavík, Iceland. Sun Voyager is described as a dreamboat, or an ode to the Sun. The artist intended it to convey the promise of undiscovered territory, a dream of hope, progress and freedom.

== History ==
In 1986, the district association of the west part of the city funded a competition for a new outdoor sculpture to commemorate the 200th anniversary of the city of Reykjavík. Árnason's Sun Voyager won the competition, and the aluminium model (42.5 cm × 88 cm × 36 cm, 16.7 in × 34.6 in × 14.2 in) was presented to the city for enlargement. The full-sized Sun Voyager was eventually unveiled on Sæbraut on the birthday of the city of Reykjavík, 18 August 1990.

The work is constructed of stainless steel and stands on a circle of granite slabs surrounded by so-called "town-hall concrete". It was constructed in accordance with Árnason's enlarged full-scale drawing of Sun Voyager and was overseen by his assistant, the artist Kristin E. Hrafnsson. The engineering of the sculpture was supervised by the technologist Sigurjón Yngvason, in close cooperation with Árnason himself, the construction was carried out by Reynir Hjálmtýsson and his assistant.

== Concept ==
In an interview published in the newspaper Þjóðviljinn on 11 June 1987, Árnason described the genesis of the work as being part of the Scandinavian art project Experimental Environment, which conducted various artistic experiments in Iceland, Denmark and other places in the 1980s:

In May 1985, a group of artists, members of the Scandinavian art project Experimental Environment, gathered to take part in the Saari-Vala Environmental Art Action in Bockholm, Finland. There I experienced a sense of the history of the origins of Icelanders, something which is also related in the present exhibition at the Nordic House in Reykjavík.

I had an uncanny feeling that I had been on this island before, when travelling on my way from Mongolia to Iceland, hundreds of years ago.

As you know, there have been speculations that the Icelanders as a race originated in Mongolia. I have discovered the history of their migration to Iceland, which runs as follows: Many centuries ago, a mighty warlord, let’s say it was Alexander the Great, was living in the centre of the known world. He dispatched his bravest and most experienced warriors, along with some women, scribes and other followers, on an exploratory expedition to the cardinal directions, the north, west, south, and east, in order to discover and conquer new, unknown territories. Those who headed east followed the rising sun until they reached the steppes of Mongolia. There they settled down and lived in comfort. Those scribes who accompanied the warriors were expected to document the expedition for the king. Several centuries later, when the documents written by the scribes eventually came to be examined, the people discovered that they had another fatherland in the west. They therefore decided to gather together their belongings and head back west towards the setting sun. We followed the sun for days and years, walking, riding and sailing. We enriched our experience and our determination grew in strength as our journey progressed, and we recorded everything that we saw and experienced. I remember endless pine forests, mountains and waterfalls, lakes, islands, rivers and seas before we eventually reached the ocean. We then constructed huge ships and sailed on westwards towards the setting sun.

As a result of this vivid experience of my participation in this expedition while on the island of Bockholm in the Finnish archipelago, I carved a picture of a sun ship into a granite rock by the sea. The sun ship symbolizes the promise of new, undiscovered territory. It is also being exhibited here at the Nordic House, made of aluminium.

== Location ==
There has been some dispute about the eventual location of Sun Voyager on Sæbraut in Reykjavík. Some people have complained that the ship does not face west, towards the setting Sun in accordance with the concept behind it. The original intention had been for Sun Voyager to be situated in the west part of Reykjavík, for obvious reasons. Árnason's original idea had been for the ship to be placed on Landakot hill, the prow facing the centre of Reykjavík and the stern to Christ the King Cathedral (Icelandic: Landakotskirkja). Another possibility was that it could be placed by the harbour in the centre of Reykjavík on a specially constructed base.

The coastline by Ánanaust nonetheless eventually came to be Árnason's preferred location for the ship. Unfortunately, changes in the town planning for Reykjavík came to rule out this location. In the end, the final decision was taken (with Árnason's consent) that Sun Voyager should be located on Sæbraut on a small headland (which the artist jokingly called Jónsnes: Jón's Peninsula). Árnason was well aware that when bolted to its platform, Sun Voyager would be facing north, but felt that that made little difference when it came down to it.

Sun Voyager was built in accordance with the artist's hand-drawn full-scale plan. Its irregular form with the ever-flowing lines and poetic movement which are a distinctive feature of so many of his works make it seem as if the ship is floating on air. It reaches out into space in such a way that the sea, the sky and the mind of the observer become part of the work as a whole. As a result, Sun Voyager has the unique quality of being able to carry each and every observer to wherever his/her mind takes him/her. Few of Árnason's works have a simple, obvious interpretation. As he stated himself, all works of art should convey a message that transcends the work itself. It is the observer who bears the eventual responsibility for interpreting the works in his/her own way, thus becoming a participant in the overall creation of the work. Árnason's works frequently make such demands on the observers, giving them the opportunity to discover new truths as a result of their experience.

== See also ==
- Icelandic art

== Bibliography ==
- Jón Gunnar Árnason, Hugarorka og sólstafir. National Gallery of Iceland, 1994.
- SÚM 1965-1972. Reykjavik Art Museum, 1989.
- Íslensk list: 16 íslenskir myndlistarmenn. Hildur, 1981.
- Íslensk listasaga, frá síðari hluta 19. aldar til upphafs 21. aldar. National Gallery of Iceland and Forlagið, 2011.
