= Willem Labeij =

Willem Labeij (3 November 1943 – 14 November 2011), was a Dutch expressionist abstract painter. Willem Labeij influenced abstract expressionism in Iceland where he lived for a number of years, especially in the rural countryside and smaller towns where he stayed from 1990 to 1994. Willem is known for a very personal, strong and poetic style in his abstract painting. As a highly educated Dutch artist living in rural communities in Iceland, his presence was noted and felt by the locals and the art community in Iceland. Willem held several exhibitions in Iceland that were noted by the press and the artist communities. Local municipalities supported his work by buying paintings from him.

== Early life and education ==
Labeij was born in Rotterdam, the Netherlands. From an early age he was profoundly interested in art and painting, especially abstract art. As a young boy, Willem wanted to be an artist and a painter but his parents did not agree. They put pressure on him to enter a maritime school in Rotterdam in 1963 and he graduated from there. For five years he sailed the oceans as a ship's mate on commercial cargo ships that sailed from the Netherlands. At the end of this period, in 1968, Willem felt that a life as an artist was what he most wanted, so he left the sea. During the time he was a sailor, Willem had his art gear with him and painted in his time off duty.

After he gave up his career in the merchant marine, Willem enrolled in the Design Academy in Eindhoven. He graduated from there, specializing in advertisement design. At this point, he planned to work as a designer in the future and use his free time for artistic painting. He worked as a designer for a while but then enrolled in the Willem De Kooning Academie in Rotterdam where he studied drawing and painting from 1968 to 1969. Later he went to the Jan Van Eyck Academy in Maastricht, where he studied oil painting, watercolors and graphic art from 1972 to 1975. Willem lived just outside the city of Maastricht for seventeen years. For eight months he lived in Paris.

== Later career ==
In 1990, Willem moved to Iceland. At first he lived in Stykkishólmur, then in Siglufjörður, Selfoss, Stokkseyri and finally in Neskaupstaður.

Willem left Iceland in 1994. Two municipalities in Iceland bought paintings from Willem, the towns of Siglufjörður and Neskaupstaður. The media in Iceland interviewed him on several occasions and he was noted for his unique style of painting. He lived in Germany and Ireland for a number of years, and then went back to the Netherlands. He had been suffering from cancer for the last two years of his life, and died at Dokkum in Friesland.

Willem's art developed over the years but he adhered to abstract expressionism, taking in the impressions of the environment and then putting them down on paper and canvas as they affected him by memory. Mountains, valleys, rock formations and the sky often supplied him with motives of this kind. As a rule he did not travel with his painting gear but went walking on long treks, gathering impressions. Then, after he returned home, he created his artwork.

Willem was noted by the artistic community and the media in Iceland where his exhibitions were portrayed as showing a strong, unique and very personal style. The nature of Iceland was a primary influence in his work. His influence on other artists in Iceland is difficult to judge, though, as this is very subjective. However, it is not a question that Willem contributed to Icelandic art. His exhibitions were noted among the general public as well as by other artists and the media. In a newspaper article on Willem's paintings from 1993 one leading Icelandic art critic stated: "It is obvious that Willem is a well educated artist with long experience in handling colors and color shades and has a great feeling for form-play. The small paintings are poetic and can be likened to short poems that get their depth and harmony from the artist's automatic responses to nature. Willem is sailing on an ocean of endless colors and form changes and is therefore not unlike the Flying Dutchman." In the same article it also says that "The paintings are obviously made under impressions from nature and the environment, and this is the way that earthbound artists work, even those who paint in the most abstract way. External impressions can namely be shown in pure, geometrical and abstract form, most clearly manifest by Piet Mondrian".

Willem held numerous art exhibitions during his life in the Netherlands, France, Iceland, Germany, Morocco and Ireland. His painting style was mostly abstract expressionism, although he experimented with several other styles. He used oil on canvas and watercolors on paper for his work. During his later years Willem used compositions of sea shells, flowers, stones and other natural objects as motives for digital photography. He had been using photography to assist in the artistic process since he lived in Maastricht.

== Personal life ==
Willem did not take on outside work and lived off his art most of his life. He was married to Magdalena Labeij, a physical therapist, who greatly supported her husband in his art. Willem was an easy going man, friendly and humorous. His friends knew that his whole life revolved around his art, which kept him busy from morning to late at night. His artistic output was immense.

== See also ==
- Icelandic art Information about art and artists in Iceland.
- National and University Library of Iceland The online E-magazine and newspaper collection contains articles about Willem's exhibitions in Iceland.
- National Gallery of Iceland
- Piet Mondrian
- Dutch art History of the visual arts in the Netherlands.
- Fine-art photographyPhotography used as artistic media.
- ArtistPersons creating art.
- Graphic design Willem studied graphic design and worked at this for a number of years.
- Salon des Réalités Nouvelles An association of artists and an art exhibition in Paris, focusing on abstract art.
- Jan Van Eyck Academie The Jan Van Eyck Academy of Fine Arts.
