= Iceland's Bell =

Iceland's Bell or Iceland Clock (Icelandic: Íslandsklukkan) may refer to:

- Iceland's Bell (novel), a 1943 book by Nobel prize winner Halldór Kiljan Laxness
- Iceland's Bell (painting), by Icelandic painter Jóhannes S. Kjarval
- Iceland's Bell (sculpture), by Kristin E. Hrafnsson
