= Gaspare Manos =

Italian painter and sculptor (born 1968)

- Born: Gaspare Manos; 6 July 1968 (age 58); Bangkok, Thailand
- Education: London School of Economics
- Known for: Painter, sculptor

Gaspare Manos (born 6 July 1968) is an Italian painter and sculptor. His work traces the boundary between abstraction and figurative art.

== Education ==
Manos was educated in Greece, Switzerland and Britain. He then studied at the London School of Economics where he gained a PhD in Economics.

== Biography and life ==
Gaspare Augusto Manos, Italian, was born in 1968, in Bangkok, Thailand [06.07.1968] to an Italian mother Elena Luxardo and father Aldo Manos a United Nations diplomat at UN ECAFE. He attended a French kindergarten where he speaks Thai, Italian and French. He visits various cities in Asia that leave a lasting impression on him. He retains strong links with Asia in general throughout his life and GQ Magazine Japan includes him in their "Men of the Year" [GQ Edition Edition – January 2013 – Japan], with other Italian artists such as the musician Jovanotti and the actor/film director Vittorio de Sica.

1972 lives in Nairobi, Kenya for 10 years. Attended an English school, learns English and Swahili. Is influenced by the African tradition and colors.

1982 Lives in Geneva, Switzerland 2 years. Visits the Foundation Gianadda, studies Klee and the Russian Avant-Garde. Begins painting with oil paint. Meets the painter Balthus.

1984 Lives in Athens, Greece. Visits many archaeological sites and museums, studies Greek mythology. Meet painters such as Fassianos, and visits the first exhibition of German Expressionist in the Athens Museum of Modern art.

1986 lives in Cambridge, United Kingdom, where he prepares the entry exam for the university in London the following year. Pretends to be a medical student, attends courses in anatomy to better understand the shape of the human body for his art. Follows courses in architecture to better understand cities’ and their impact on social behaviour.

1987 moves to London at the University of London (LSE) awarded a bachelor's degree (1990) then a PhD (1996).

His PhD studies enables him to explore his interest in phenomenology and the urban world that often forms the subject of his art.

As revealed in his URBIS exhibition catalogue at the Museum Diocesano in Venice in 2008 [ ISBN 978-88-903081-1-6 ], he meets the philosopher Karl Popper who defines him as "the imaginifico of contemporary art."

According to Prometeo published by Mondadori – Italy, pages −101-108 dedicated to Gaspare Manos – December 2013 [ISBN 978-0-394-16300-0. – 40124] he paints portraits of many personalities of the time: the musician Rostropovich in more than 40 works, members of the Rolling Stones, and others in the political, literary or artistic arena. He spends his next 18 years in London and traveling constantly in Europe, meeting artists such as Anselm Kiefer and Cy Twombly and many others attending exhibitions and museums regularly. [ from: James Thompson, in "A life in Art" 2010, pp. 38–45].

The Museum of Modern Fine Art in Minsk exhibits his work in 2013. From the catalogue exhibition [pages 74–75] ISBN 978-88-903081-3-0 we learn that during the period 1987–2003, he met artists such as Keith Haring, Damien Hirst, Howard Hodgkin, Lucian Freud and many other personalities of that period. They encouraged him to paint – especially Lucian Freud, whom he met regularly in London. Gaspare produces various portraits of these artists exhibited at the Museum of Modern Fine Art in Minsk in 2013.

Gaspare Manos is married to a lawyer Sarah Mosole. He has four children: Sofia Manos, Giulia Manos, Orso-Augusto Manos, Alma-Augusta Manos.

The artist lives and works in London [UK] and Venice [Italy].

== Career ==
The Italian artist Gaspare Manos was born 6 July 1968 in Bangkok / Thailand from a United Nations diplomat father and mother Elena Luxardo.

The work of Manos traces the boundary between abstract art and figurative art and draws on his experiences living in Asia (1968–73), Africa (1973–1982) and Europe (1983–present). Gaspare Manos is well known for his artistic interpretation of the urban world and his aim to define a new theory of art based on phenomenology.

His paintings, sculptures and installations show distinct periods and interconnected themes revolving around concepts of memory, space and place. These are traceable to key periods of his life as follows: (1968–1972 Thailand); (1973–1982 Kenya); (1982–1984 Greece); (1987–1991 UK); (1991–1992 Belgium); (1993 – current – UK – France – Italy)

The fragmentation and overlay of his contrasting socio-cultural life experiences explain the large body of work addressing different, yet complementary topics. These range from semi abstract oneiric interpretations of urban landscapes [exhibited at the URBIS museum retrospective during the Venice Architectural Biennale in 2008], to works of photographic precision [62 portraits exhibited at the Museum of Modern Fine Art in Minsk in 2013], counterbalanced by his Africa related works and fetish installation exhibited next to Cy Twombly sculptures and Miguel Barcelo’ ceramics 10 years earlier by Juris & Perl, or at the International Sculpture and Installation Exhibition OPEN no.13 and no.20, Venice [2010 & 2017] with artists such as Dennis Oppenheim, Luigi Ontani, Yoko Ono, Igor Mitoraj and others.

Manos sculptures represent an important related body of work spanning over 25 years of his career. Often made using found materials, these are sometimes painted by the artist but generally left monochrome grey or bone colour. They make reference to objects Manos viewed and experienced in his many travels around the world. For the great part, these are more intimate in scale, and made of basic materials such as clay; sticks; used brushes from his studio; nails; bricks; ceramic remains and drift wood collected by the artist or his children. These sculptures, sometimes cast in bronze or left in their original form, remind us of reliquaries, or shamanistic and fetishlike objects of devotion he saw in Africa during his childhood. They are Proustian physical time capsules of intense concentrated recollections that are in stark contrast to some of the more ephemeral and cerebral depictions of his urban and natural landscape ‘memory paintings’.

If the Manos cerebral ‘urban paintings’ are the Ying of this artist's output, his sculptures are the counterbalancing physical Yang. The artist's PhD research at the London School of Economics in the 1990s based on Phenomenology, and his lifelong interest in the concept of memory and relative nature of knowledge permeate the totality of his subject matters and career output. It provides the uniting thread to understand his works of art.

The Director of the Museum of Modern Art of Minsk, Natalia Sharanhovich has stated in the 62 portraits Manos catalogue of the Museum in 2013 ISBN 978-88-903081-3-0 that the career and painting method of Gaspare Manos shows a very strong pictorial unity with fundamental codes of trans-European culture and reveals the depth of his involvement with contemporary art.

Writing about the career of Gaspare Manos, The Director of the Joan Miró Foundation in Barcelona has stated in the 1998 Urbis Museum Catalogue that "this artist's concept of space draws him close to architecture and his capacity to dominate color endows him with the responsibility of being an heir to the pictorial tradition of his country Italy".

His paintings exhibited during the inauguration of the Museo della Civiltà Istriana Fiumana e Dalmata in Trieste in 2009. His works are included in private, corporate and public collections around the world as shown by the URBIS exhibition in Venice, Italy, (2008) with over 150 works reunited in a single retrospective of this painter.

In October 2015 Gaspare Manos was invited to be part of a four-member jury of the first Belarus National Art Salon d'Automne in Minsk together with Dieter Roelstraete curator Documenta 14 Kassel, Æsa Sigurjónsdóttir Professor University of Iceland and Teresa Iarocci Mavica from the VAC Foundation. Gaspare Manos was again one of the 5 member jury for the 2017 and 2018 Belarus Art Salon held in Minsk sponsored by Belgazprombank.

== Selected exhibitions ==
- 2022 – INNO ALLA LINEA - Milano Exhibition Area 35 Gallery, 18 Large works on canvas and drawings by GASPARE MANOS from 2018.
- 2017 – OPEN 20 INTERNATIONAL EXHIBITION OF SCULPTURES AND INSTALLATIONS representing Italy with Luigi Ontani, Max Papeschi etc. Venice, Italy.
- 2017 – GASPARE MANOS Musée de Beaux-Arts de Saint-Lô, France.
- 2016 – The Venice Paintings – 40 works from the period 1998–2016 – Galerie Piece-Unique – Paris, France.
- 2015 – The Origins exhibition – Africa related works by GASPARE MANOS curated by Miguel Mallol Sanchis – Ledame – London, UK.
- 2014 – GASPARE MANOS – urban paintings and collages – Juris and Perl Arte Moderna & Contemporanea, Venice, Italy.
- 2013 – GASPARE MANOS: 62 portraits at the Museum of Modern Art MOMA, Minsk, Belarus.
- 2013 – GASPARE MANOS: THE PURPLE SERIES – A project for the 40m2 ceiling of Palazzo Duodo during the Venice Biennale 2013. Juris and Perl Arte Moderna & Contemporanea Venice.
- 2011 – GASPARE MANOS, PIERRE SOULAGES, JEAN-MICHEL BASQUIAT – Hubert Konrad GALLERY – 32 Avenue Matignon, Paris, France
- 2010 – VENICE FILM FESTIVAL: GASPARE MANOS & JOHN WOO film director SCULPTURE PRIZE OPEN 13 – Excelsior Venice.
- 2010 – GASPARE MANOS representing ITALY at OPEN 13 INTERNATIONAL EXHIBITION OF SCULPTURES AND INSTALLATIONS 2010 – VENICE – other artists of OPEN: Sandro Chia, Marc Quinn, Louise Bourgeois, Emilio Vedova, Richard Long, Cesar, Beverly Pepper, Keith Haring and Julian Schnabel.
- 2010 – GASPARE MANOS inaugural museum exhibition at the Civico Museo della Civiltà Istriana Fiumana e Dalmata – Trieste, Italy
- 2010 – Omaggio a Peggy Guggeheim group show with GASPARE MANOS. Studio Barozzi, Venice, Italy.
- 2009 – GASPARE MANOS: THE URBAN RHAPSODY EXHIBITION at the BOULAKIA GALLERY – PARIS / Catalogue Pierre Cornette de St Cyr – President Museum of Modern Art, Paris, France.
- 2009 – GASPARE MANOS: THE KIMONO PAINTINGS during the 2009 Venice Biennale – Juris and Perl Arte Moderna & Contemporanea.
- 2008 – GASPARE MANOS 150 paintings & drawings from the period 1982–2008 MUSEO DIOCESANO VENEZIA – patronage City of Venice during the Architectural Biennale 2008. Catalogue Rosa Maria Malet – Director of the Joan Miró Foundation – Barcelona & Alan Jones – New York.
- 2008 – GASPARE MANOS: CAVE CANEM – 55 works of art by Manos at MEL CONTEMPORARY – Vienna, Austria.
- 2007 – GASPARE MANOS/ MIGUEL BARCELO’: AFRICA RELATED WORKS, Venice, Italy Juris and Perl.
- 2007 – ITHACA: 50 paintings by GASPARE MANOS- Palazzo della Provincia, Reggio Calabria – patronage City of Reggio Calabria and MasterCard – Curator and catalogue: Josette di Bosco Balsa.
- 2006 – Three sculptures: ANTHONY CARO / CY TWOMBLY / GASPARE MANOS- Venice, Italy Juris and Perl.
- 2005 – GASPARE MANOS: 12 Venice paintings – Juris and Perl Arte Moderna & Contemporanea.

== Further reading and references ==
- Ongaretti, Michela (2021). Gaspare Manos La fenomenologia della linea e del colore. ArtsCore.
- Zampini, Umberto (2017). Open 20: Esposizione Internazionale di Sculture ed Installazioni 2010. Arte Communications.
- Jones, Alan (2017). The Venice Conversations with Gaspare Manos published on the occasion of the Saint-Lô Museum Exhibition –. Saint-Lô, France.
- Blaizeau, Robert (2017). Gaspare Manos – Guide de l'exposition Collectioneur 2. Musée de Beaux-Arts de Saint-Lô, France. ISBN 978-2-9535953-7-6
- Schaal, Francesca (December 2013). "Chi e' Gaspare Manos: Pittore, disegnatore, scultore, ritrattista, cantore delle citta' del mondo". Prometeo: Rivista Trimestrale di Scienze e Storia. Arnaldo Mondadori Editore PROMETEO Rivista trimestrale di scienze e storia anno 31 numero 124. ISSN 0394-1639.
- Sharanhovich, Natalia (2013). Gaspare Manos: 62 Portraits. Museum of Modern Fine Art, Minsk, Belarus. ISBN 978-88-903081-3-0
- de Halleux, Elisa (2013). Gaspare Manos The Purple Series: Paintings and Drawings 2010–2013. Juris & Perl, Venice. ISBN 978-88-903081-2-3
- Konrad, Hubert (2011). Voyages: 40 paintings by Gaspare Manos. Galerie Hubert Konrad, 32 Avenue Matignon, Paris.
- Tompson, James (2011). The Gaspare Manos Memento Mori Triptych. Venice Art Press.
- Hwong, Abel (2011). Gaspare Manos in China. APEX Manual China.
- Thomson, James (2011). The Box: paper and ceramic faces by Gaspare Manos. The Art Publisher.
- Jones, Alan (2011). Ode to the Box – Speculations on the Cubic Dimension in the Work of Gaspare Manos. Venice Art Press.
- De Grandis, Paolo (2010). Open 13: Esposizione Internazionale di Sculture ed Installazioni 2010. Arte Communications.
- Cornette de Saint-Cyr, Pierre (2010). Gaspare Manos: Rhapsodie Urbaine 32 oeuvres 1999–2009. Boulakia Gallery, 10 Avenue Matignon Paris.
- Boscolo, Cinzia (2009). Ritratto d'artista: Gaspare Manos. The Venice International Foundation No.21.
- Garbin, Daria (2009). Mostra d'arte Inaugurazione Museo Della Civilta' Dalmata a Trieste. Il Dalmata No.62.
- Jones, Alan (2008). Urbis: Gaspare Manos al Museo Diocesano di Venezia. Museo Diocesano. ISBN 978-88-903081-1-6
- Vukov, Ana. Interview with GASPARE MANOS during the 52 Venice Art Biennale: Ljepotu nalazim gdje ima istine, narocito kada se radi o ljudima. EPOHA No.52 Croatia 2007.
- De Salvo, Luisa (2007). Painting for oneself, salvation from chaos: New York Interview with the painter GASPARE MANOS. NYCVE the culture and current affairs monthly, New York.
- Mazzella di Bosco Balsa, Josette (2007). Itaca: Gaspare Manos 50 works of art in the Gaspare Foundation and Other Contemporary Art Collections. Palazzo della Provincia. ISBN 978-88-903081-0-9
