= Icelandic art =

Icelandic art has been built on northern European traditions of the nineteenth century, but developed in distinct directions in the twentieth century, influenced in particular by the unique Icelandic landscape as well as by Icelandic mythology and culture.

Contemporary Icelandic painting is typically traced to the work of Þórarinn Þorláksson, who, following formal training in art in the 1890s in Copenhagen, returned to Iceland to paint and exhibit works from 1900 to his death in 1924, almost exclusively portraying the Icelandic landscape. Þorláksson was not the only Icelandic artist learning in Denmark at that time: there were several Icelanders, both men and women, at the academy in the closing years of the century, and these included Ásgrímur Jónsson, who together with Þorláksson created a distinctive portrayal of their home country's landscape in a romantic naturalistic style.

Today, many of Icelandic artists are registered with The Association of Icelandic Artists. The Icelandic Art Center aims to represent Icelandic artists abroad. Every other year, Iceland participates in the Venice Biennale and has done so since 1960. Sigurður Guðjónsson, video artist, has been chosen to represent his country in the coming biennale, which opens in 2021. In 2019, Hrafnhildur Arnardóttir participated on behalf of Iceland. Before that, Egill Sæbjörnsson represented Iceland at the Venice Biennale, in 2017. Christoph Büchel was chosen to represent Iceland in 2015, with his work "The Mosque", which was located in the church of Santa Maria della Misericordia.

Iceland has one biennale, called the Sequences, which focuses on video and performances and has been held nine times. Artists Hildigunnur Birgisdóttir and Ingólfur Arnarsson were the curators of Sequences 2019.

Iceland has many museums and galleries.

== Landscape painting ==
The distinctive rendition of the Icelandic landscape by its painters can be linked to nationalism and the movement toward home rule and independence, which was very active in this period. Other landscape artists quickly followed in the footsteps of Þorláksson and Jónsson. These included Jóhannes Kjarval, Jón Stefánsson, and Júlíana Sveinsdóttir. Kjarval in particular is noted for the distinct techniques in the application of paint that he developed in a concerted effort to render the characteristic volcanic rock that dominates the Icelandic environment.

== The emergence of abstract art ==
Abstract art became prominent in Iceland in the mid-twentieth century, spearheaded by artists such as Svavar Guðnason and Nína Tryggvadóttir. However some of the country's prominent artists working in that period eschewed abstractionism, such as Gunnlaugur Scheving who instead favoured narrative content and an approach to colour and form possibly influenced by fauvism and cubism; and Louisa Matthíasdóttir, based in New York, who learned from abstract expressionism but nevertheless painted from life.

== The return of figurative art ==
Einar Hákonarson's show in 1968 distinguished itself from its Icelandic art scene then current as Hákonarson's paintings were pop, figurative and expressionistic. This exhibition brought the figure back into the Icelandic painting, which had been dominated by the abstract art for years. Hakonarson said he was more influenced by feeling for nature, rather than by trying to paint a specific part of it.

== Icelandic art from the late twentieth century ==
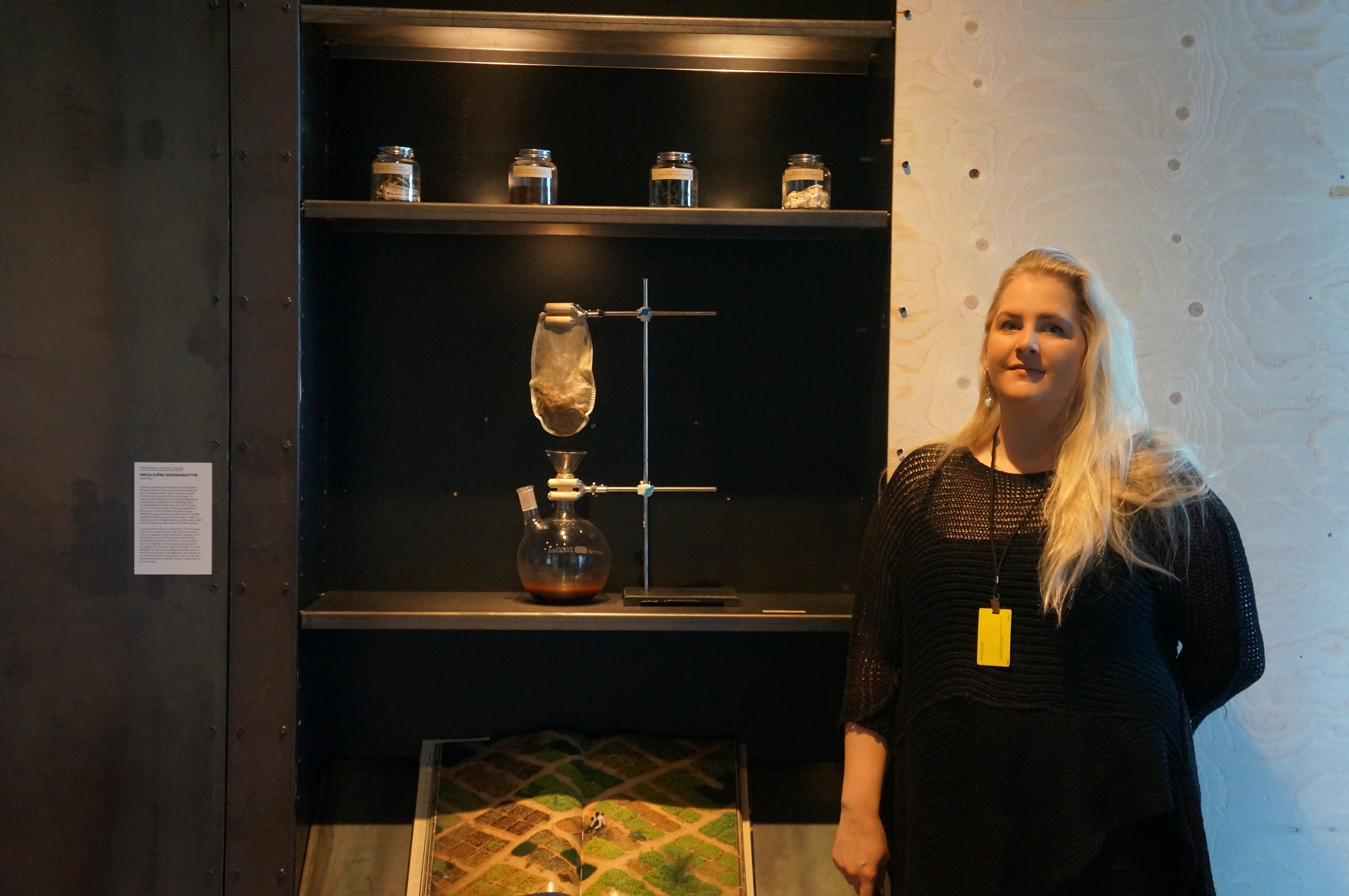
In Iceland, Ms. Emilía Björg Sigurðardóttir displayed her creation, Next Soil, as part of product design art.

The portrayal of the landscape through visual art has remained a prominent (perhaps the most prominent) theme in Icelandic art to the present day, often reflected in the exhibitions at the country's national gallery. Its 2007 summer exhibition, for example, was called "Alas Nature!" and described as an exhibition which "aims to examine nature in a different light and from a different angle from what is generally accepted". Debate has occurred within the artistic community as to whether an appropriate balance has been struck in the support of galleries and public institutions for different media, traditions and subjects in Icelandic visual art.

== See also ==
- Architecture of Iceland
- Center for Icelandic Art
- Culture of Iceland
- List of Icelandic visual artists
- SEQUENCES real-time art festival
