= Hallsteinn Sigurðsson =

Icelandic sculptor (born 1945

Hallsteinn Sigurðsson (born 1945) is an Icelandic sculptor.

He is noted for his Nordic-god sculptures, some of which are located at the Laxá Power Station in the north central part of the country and are arranged in the facility’s tunnels and vaults. Some twenty-five of his sculptures are exhibited in the Gufunes sculpture park in north-east Reykjavík.

== Early life and education ==
Hallsteinn Sigurðsson was born in 1945 and studied at the School of Arts and Crafts in Iceland from 1963 to 1966, then went to the United Kingdom, where he studied sculpture at the Hornsey College of Art, London (1966–1967), Hammersmith College of Art, London (1967–1969) and the Saint Martin's School of Art, London (1969–1972). In London, he was influenced by the work of Anthony Caro and other "New Generation" sculptors. After completing his studies in London, he made study trips to Italy, Greece and the United States.

== Career ==
Hallsteinn held more than a dozen solo exhibitions between 1971 and 1997, and has been hired to create monuments for various organizations and municipalities in Iceland.

Early in his career, Hallsteinn created sculpture cast from concrete and various plastics. In his more recent works, Hallsteinn most often uses aluminium and iron alloy, generally in abstract and geometric forms. Over time, his structures have become lighter in form.

Dozens of Heklatein's works are in public ownership, and his works are represented in the collections of museums, including the Borgarness Museum, Icelandic National Gallery and Reykjavík Art Museum in Reykjavík. Some twenty-five of his sculptures are exhibited in the Gufunes sculpture park in northeast Reykjavík.

Hallsteinn is a member of the Icelandic Sculptors Society, which he established in Reykjavík in 1972, along with Jon Gunnar Árnason, Ragnar Kjartansson, Þorbjörg Pálsdóttir and others. He is also a member of the Icelandic Association of Visual Artists.

In 2002, a set of his sculptures based on Nordic mythology was installed in the tunnels and vaults of the Laxárvirkjun hydroelectric power station in north-central Iceland, where the works can be seen by visitors each summer. In 2006, he exhibited at the Sigurjón Ólafsson Museum with a collection named "Wheel-Plow-Wings".

== Notable works ==
- Ál-eggið – 1968
- Maður og kona I – 1968
- Ferningar I − 1973
- Steinbarn II – 1974
- Hyrningar VIII − 1975
- Veðrahöll IV – 1978
- Harpa − 1987
- Svif XXIII – 1987
- Fönsun IX – 1988
- Far I – 1991
- Far II – 1991
- Keilur V – 1991
- Skeljar I − 1994
- Skeljar III − 1994
- Skeljar V − 1994
- Skeljar VII − 1994
- Fönsun XII – 1994
- Pýramídar II − 1994
- Píramídar III − 1996
- Skeljar XII − 1996
- Veðrahöll IX – 2002
- Fönsun XVI – 2004
- Vængir I – 2005

== Personal life ==
Hallsteinn Sigurðsson resides in Reykjavík.

== See also ==
- List of Icelandic artists
- List of people from Reykjavík
- List of sculptors
- List of alumni of Saint Martin's School of Art
