= Gunnlaugur =

Gunnlaugur [ˈkʏnːˌlœyːɣʏr̥] is an Icelandic given name, originally from Old Norse Gunnlaugr [ˈɡunːˌlɔuɣz̠]. Notable people with the name include:

- Gunnlaugur Jónsson (born 1974), Icelandic football manager
- Gunnlaugur Scheving (1904–1972), Icelandic painter
- Gunnlaugr Leifsson (died c. 1218), Icelandic scholar, author and poet
- Gunnlaugr Ormstunga (c. 983–1008), Icelandic poet

== See also ==
- Gunnlaugsson
