= Hrafnsson =

Hrafnsson is an Icelandic patronymic surname, son of Hraffn (raven). Notable people with the surname include:

- Jón korpur Hrafnsson (born 1255), Icelandic noble
- Kristin E. Hrafnsson (born 1960), Icelandic artist
- Kristinn Hrafnsson (born 1962), Icelandic journalist
