= Hulda Hákon =

Icelandic visual artist (born 1956)

- Born: 1956 (age 69–70); Reykjavík, Iceland
- Education: Icelandic College of Arts and Crafts; School of Visual Arts, New York
- Known for: Sculpture, relief
- Movement: Neo-expressionism
- Website: www.huldahakon.com

Hulda Hákon (born 1956) is an Icelandic visual artist. She is best known for narrative wall reliefs and sculptures that combine figures, animals and short, deliberately ambiguous texts, and she has been described as one of the distinctive voices of Icelandic art since the 1980s.

== Early life and education ==
Hulda Hákon was born in Reykjavík in 1956. She attended Menntaskólinn við Tjörnina and went on to study in the experimental new-media department of the Icelandic College of Arts and Crafts (Myndlista- og handíðaskóli Íslands), where several of her teachers came out of the Fluxus movement. She continued her studies at the School of Visual Arts in New York and spent roughly five years in the city's East Village art scene during the 1980s, working for a time as a guard at PS1. She returned to Iceland in 1985.

== Work ==
Hulda Hákon works chiefly in sculpture and low relief. Her early pieces were assembled from scrap timber and other discarded material; later works include painted casts, bronze and acrylic painting. Her subjects are drawn from Icelandic storytelling traditions — heroes, animals and everyday human situations — staged as small scenes and paired with captions that open a second layer of meaning. Recurring themes include environmentalism, consumerism and the conventions of communication.

She has cited the artist Dieter Roth and the Fluxus sensibility as lasting influences, together with Mexican ex-voto paintings, whose combination of a small painted image with a written account shaped her approach to joining text and picture.

In 2019 the National Gallery of Iceland mounted a retrospective of her work, Hverra manna ertu? (Who are your People?), covering the period from 1983 to 2019. She has frequently exhibited alongside the painter Jón Óskar.

Outside her studio practice, she ran the Reykjavík café Grái kötturinn for nearly two decades, where it became a meeting place for artists and writers.

== Collections ==
Hulda Hákon's work is held by the National Gallery of Iceland and the Reykjavík Art Museum, which holds sixteen of her sculptures, as well as by Kiasma in Helsinki and the Malmö Art Museum in Sweden.
