= Sigríður Zoëga =

Icelandic photographer

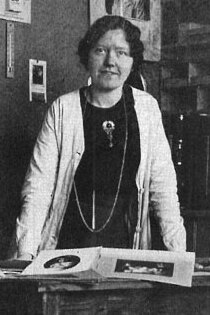
- Born: April 14, 1889; Reykjavík
- Died: September 24, 1968
- Occupation: Photographer
- Father: Geir T. Zoëga

Sigríður Geirsdóttir Zoëga (April 14, 1889 – September 24, 1968) was an Icelandic photographer. She was one of the most prominent photographers in Iceland in the first half of the 20th century.

== Early life and education ==
Sigríður Zoëga was born on April 14, 1889 in Reykjavík, the daughter of linguist and educator Geir T. Zoëga. She and her sister Guðrún trained under photographer Pétur Brynjólfsson.

== Career ==
In 1910, she left Iceland for Copenhagen, where she worked in the studio of Nora Lindstrøm, then went to Germany to work for Otto Kelch. Her experience was mostly with studio work like retouching and she had limited experience with actually taking pictures until she became an assistant to German photographer August Sander.

After three years with Sander, Zoëga returned to Iceland in April 1914 to open a photography studio in Reykjavík with financial help from her family. The next year, a fire destroyed her studio, but she and her friend Steinunn Thorsteinsson bought Brynjólfsson's studio and opened a new studio, Sigr. Zoëga & Co.

Zoëga's photographic work was primarily portraiture, and her style was a relaxed and natural one favored by the rising bourgeois class in a growing Reykjavík, in contrast to stiff carte-de-visite-style portraits of previous generations. She closed her studio in 1955 and donated her photographic plates, numbering in the thousands, to the National Museum of Iceland.

She was one of the founders of the Icelandic Photographers' Society in 1926 and the Listvinafélagið (Friends of the Arts Society) in 1916.

== Personal life ==
Zoëga had a daughter with painter Jón Stefánsson. They did not marry and Zoëga raised her daughter on her own.
