= Geir T. Zoëga =

Icelandic linguist

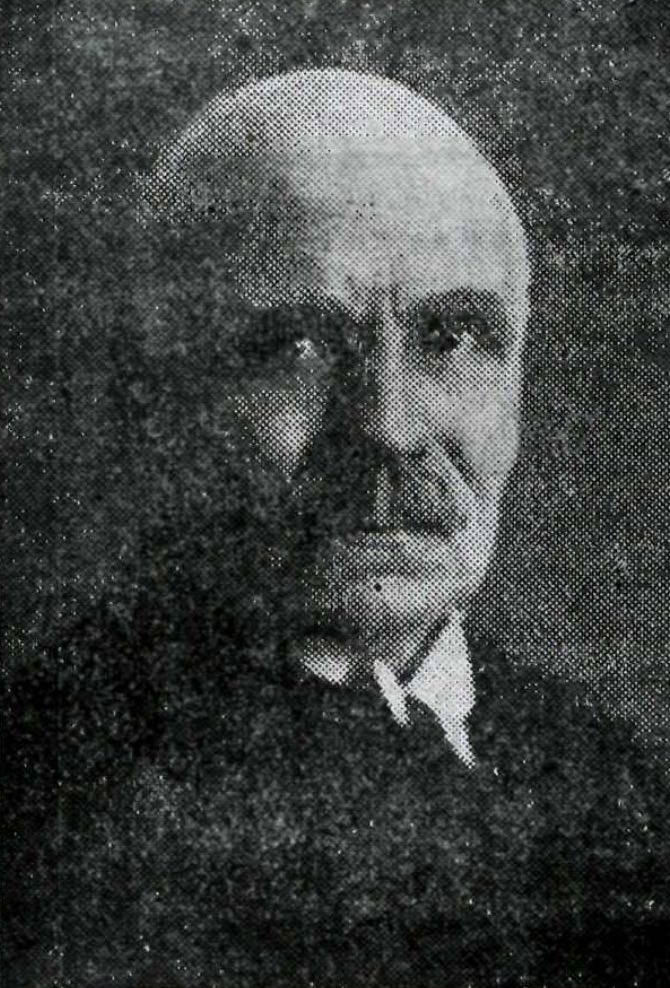
Geir T. Zoëga (1857–1928)

Geir Tómasson Zoëga (G. T. Zoëga), born 1857, died 1928, was an Icelandic linguist, known for writing several English-to-Icelandic and Icelandic-to-English dictionaries, as well as a dictionary on Old Icelandic, largely corresponding to Old Norse.

== Career ==
Zoëga was the first master in the Grammar School of Reykjavík. From 1883 he worked as an English teacher at the Reykjavik Junior College (Icelandic: Menntaskólinn í Reykjavík), later, in 1913, to his death, taking the position of rector at the school.

Throughout his life he released several English-to-Icelandic and Icelandic-to-English dictionaries. He died in 1928, before he could finish the third edition of his Icelandic-to-English dictionary. The editorship then fell to his son-in-law Þorsteinn Þorsteinsson (1880–1979), husband of Zoëga's daughter Guðrún Geirsdóttir Zoëga (1887–1955), and was released in 1932.

== Personal life ==
Geir Zoëga had two daughters: Guðrún Geirsdóttir Zoëga (1887–1955) and Sigríður Geirsdóttir Zoëga (1889–1968).

Guðrún married Icelandic economist Þorsteinn Þorsteinsson (1880–1979), giving Geir five grandchildren between them. Sigríður never married but had a daughter with painter Jón Stefánsson whom she raised alone.

== Bibliography ==
- 1896 – Ensk-Islenzk orđabók : English-Icelandic dictionary. Reykjavík: Sigurður Kristjánsson. SELIBR 9853884
- 1904 – Íslenzk-Ensk orđabók : Icelandic–English dictionary. Reykjavík: Sigurður Kristjánsson. SELIBR 2848057
- 1910 – A concise dictionary of Old Icelandic. Oxford: Clarendon Press. SELIBR 829064
- 1911 – English-Icelandic dictionary : Ensk-íslenzk orðabók (second edition (önnur útgáfa) ed.). Reykjavík: Sigurdur Kristjansson. SELIBR 3200402
- 1922 – Icelandic-English dictionary : Íslenzk-Ensk orđabók (second edition, enlarged, önnur útgáfa, aukin ed.). Reykjavík: Sigurdur Kristjansson. SELIBR 3200403 SELIBR brt5f83l8sb4slkh
- 1932 – Islenzk-ensk ordabók [Icelandic-English dictionary] (þriðja útgáfa ed.). Reykjavík: Bókaverzlung Sigurðar Kristjánssonar. SELIBR 9067167 – published post-morten, finished by: Þorsteinn Þorsteinsson
