= Icelandic Sculptors Society =

Icelandic arts organization

The Icelandic Sculptors Society was established in the Icelandic capital of Reykjavík in 1972 by Hallsteinn Sigurðsson, Jon Gunnar Árnason, Ragnar Kjartansson, Þorbjörg Pálsdóttir and others.

== See also ==
- Icelandic art
- Sculpture
