= Iceland's Bell (sculpture) =

Public sculpture

Coordinates: 65.685916°N 18.120306°W

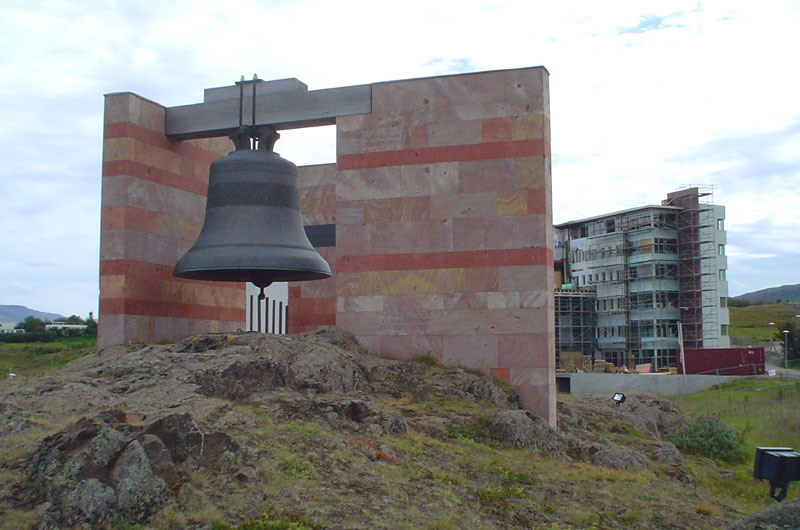
Íslandsklukkan in 2004, with Borgir under construction in the background.

Iceland's Bell or The Iceland Clock (Icelandic: Íslandsklukkan) is an outdoor art piece by Kristin E. Hrafnsson at the University of Akureyri in northern Iceland. It was commissioned by the city of Akureyri and it references the "vigilance that characterizes good university people". The artwork was Hrafnsson's contribution to a competition held by the city of Akureyri in 2000 to commemorate the millennium advent of Christianity in Iceland and Leif Erikson's first colonization of North America.

Ownership of the piece was transferred to the university by the city in 2001 and has been incorporated into the university logo. On 24 August 2012, the bell was rung 150 times to commemorate the 150th anniversary of Akureyri's regaining of municipal status and the 25th anniversary of the University of Akureyri.

Iceland's Bell is a 1943 historical novel of the same name by Nobel Prize-winning Icelandic author Halldór Kiljan Laxness. Arguably the most important Icelandic painter, Jóhannes Kjarval, depicts the "cutting down the bell" scene from the Íslandsklukkan book in a painting with the same title that currently hangs in the Kjarvalstadir museum, in Reykjavík. Thus the imagery of a bell clock has an important place in Icelandic art.
