= Jón Gunnar Árnason =

Icelandic sculptor (1931–1989)

Jón Gunnar Árnason (1931 – 1989 in Reykjavík) was an Icelandic sculptor. After studying at the University of Iceland Reykjavík Arts and Crafts from 1944 to 1946 and the School of Visual Arts, he graduated as an engineer from the Technical University of Reykjavik in 1952. From 1965 to 1967 he continued his studies of the fine arts at the Hornsey College of Art in London.

His sculpture Sólfar (Icelandic: Sun Voyager) is a landmark on the seafront in Reykjavík. His works have been exhibited in galleries in Iceland, Norway, the Netherlands and Germany. He was a member of the Icelandic Sculptors Society which he established in Reykjavík in 1972 along with Hallsteinn Sigurðsson, Ragnar Kjartansson, Þorbjörg Pálsdóttir and others.
