= Sveinn Kjarval =

Icelandic interior designer (1919–1981)

Sveinn Kjarval (20 February 1919 - 10 February 1981) was an Icelandic interior designer. He is considered one of the most prolific interior designers in Icelandic history.

Sveinn was born in Denmark on February 20, 1919. His parents were the important Icelandic painter Johannes Kjarval and Tove Merrild. He lived in Iceland during his infancy but moved to Denmark when his parents divorced. He returned to Iceland in 1939 and worked as a furniture maker. After the Second World War, he pursued postgraduate education in Denmark, where he learned interior design, and in 1949, he moved back to Iceland. At that time, there were few people educated in interior design in Iceland, so he became a pioneer in that field.
