= Þorbjörg Pálsdóttir =

Icelandic sculptor (1919–2009)

Þorbjörg Guðrún Pálsdóttir
- Born: Þorbjörg Guðrún Pálsdóttir; 10 February 1919; Reykjavík, Iceland
- Died: 11 November 2009 (aged 90); Reykjavík
- Known for: sculpting

Þorbjörg Guðrún Pálsdóttir (10 February 1919, Reykjavík – 11 November 2009, Reykjavík) was an Icelandic sculptor. She is perhaps best known for her four green alien-like public statues Dansleikur/Dance in Reykjavík, which she completed in 1970, and which is located on Perlan, the highest hill in the city. Other works of note include Par (1994) and Boy and Girl (1968), located at Tjörnin. She was a member of the Icelandic Sculptors Society, which she established in the Icelandic capital in 1972 along with Hallsteinn Sigurðsson, Jon Gunnar Árnason, Ragnar Kjartansson and others.

The daughter of Páll Ólafsson and Hildur Stefánsdóttir, she married physician Andrés Ásmundsson (1916–2006) on 6 August 1942. They had five children and two adopted children, 18 grandchildren and 4 great-grandchildren. She attended the Commercial College of Iceland and studied photography at Reykjavík Technical College and also studied in Stockholm. Works by Þorbjörg are owned by various institutions, including the Icelandic National Gallery and Reykjavík Art Museum.

She died in 2009, aged 90.

== Sources ==
- Leifur Þorsteinsson, Ernir Snorrason, and Jóhann Eyfells. Þorbjörg Pálsdóttir myndhöggvari. Reykjavík: Listhüs, 1983. OCLC 63345079 (in Icelandic)
