= Icelandic Esperanto Association =

National association linked to the World Esperanto Association (UEA)

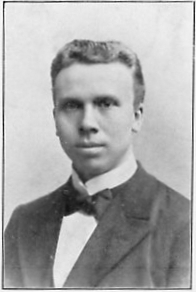
Þorsteinn Þorsteinsson, the first promoter of Esperanto in Iceland

The Icelandic Esperanto Association (Esperanto: Islanda Esperanto-Asocio; Icelandic: Íslenska esperantosambandið, Esperantosamband Íslands) is one of the national associations of the Universal Esperanto Association (UEA). It was founded in 1950 and joined the Universal Esperanto Association in 1975. It publishes a magazine called La velo (The Sail). Its president is Hannes Högni Vilhjálmsson (as of November 2014).

The association has twice hosted the World Esperanto Congress: the 62nd in the summer of 1977 and the 98th in Reykjavík from July 20 to July 27, 2013.

The first national Esperanto association in Iceland, Samband íslenzkra esperantista, was founded in 1931.
