= Þorsteinn Þorsteinsson =

Icelandic economist and author

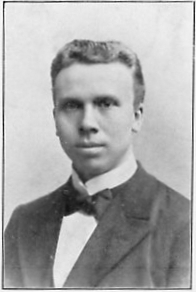
Þorsteinn Þorsteinsson in 1906

Þorsteinn Þorsteinsson (also written Thorsteinn Thorsteinsson; 5 April 1880 – 22 February 1979) was an Icelandic economist, director of the Icelandic Bureau of Statistics, and also one of the first authorities on Esperanto in Iceland, author of the first Icelandic textbook on Esperanto.

== Life and career ==
Þorsteinn Þorsteinsson was born at Brú in Biskupstungur, in Árnessýsla, the youngest of six children. The poet Tómas Guðmundsson was a cousin. He graduated in 1902 from Menntaskólinn í Reykjavík, then earned a Candid. Polit. degree in economics from the University of Copenhagen in 1906, the fourth Icelander to major in the field. He started work at the Icelandic Department of Industry and Transportation, transferred in 1909 to the Department of Finance, and then on 1 January 1914 became director of the newly created Bureau of Statistics, where he continued working until his retirement in 1950. He also taught economics part-time at the Commercial College of Iceland from 1916 to 1929 and was an examiner in the subject at the University of Iceland beginning in 1941.

He sat on several boards and was a founder and first president of the Icelandic Association of Economists (Félag hagfræðinga).

Þorsteinn was married to Guðrún Geirsdóttir Zoëga (1887–1955) daughter of Geir T. Zoëga, the rector of Menntaskólinn í Reykjavík. They had five children. He died in Reykjavík.

== Esperanto ==
Þorsteinn learned Esperanto in 1899, and soon after started to publish articles making the case for Esperanto. He wrote the first Icelandic textbook of Esperanto, a translation of the book by Théophile Cart; it appeared in 1909 and was republished in 1927.

In 1927 he co-founded the first Icelandic Esperanto Society in Reykjavík, and served as its president until 1931, when the first Icelandic Esperanto Association, Samband íslenzkra esperantista, was founded and he became its president. He became acquainted with L. L. Zamenhof during the 3rd World Esperanto Congress in 1907, corresponded with him, and in 1977 was a guest at the 62nd World Esperanto Congress, held in Reykjavík. He was a member of the Esperantist Linguistic Committee and dean of the Veteran Esperantist Club

== Honors ==
He was awarded an honorary doctorate in economics by the University of Iceland on its 35th anniversary in 1946, became a fellow of the Icelandic Academy of Sciences in 1919 and was an honorary fellow of the Icelandic Association of Economists, the Icelandic Literary Society, and the revived Icelandic Esperanto Association.

== Publications ==
In his position as director of the Bureau of Statistics, Þorsteinn edited and wrote or co-wrote many publications, including a monthly bulletin, a multi-volume list of the names in the 1703 census, and the handbook of Iceland published four times between 1926 and 1946 under the auspices of Landsbanki. Other publications include:

- Kenslubók í Esperantó: ásamt orðasafni með íslenskum þýðingum. Trans. of Cart, Théophile. L'Esperanto en dix leçons. Reykjavík: Bókaverslun Guðm. Gamalíelssonar, 1909. OCLC 10621017. (Icelandic and Esperanto)
- Island under og efter verdenskrigen: en økonomisk oversigt. Carnegie Endowment for International Peace, Division of Economics and History. Verdenskrigens økonomiske og sociale historie, Skandinavisk serie: Verdenskrigens økonomiske og sociale historie, Skandinavisk serie 4. Copenhagen: Gad, 1928. OCLC 2652299 (Danish)
- with Eli F. Heckscher, Kurt Bergendal, Wilhelm Keilhau, and Einar Cohn: Sweden, Norway, Denmark and Iceland in the World War. Economics and Social History of the World War. Carnegie Endowment for International Peace, Division of Economics and History. New Haven, Connecticut: Yale University / London: Oxford University, 1930. OCLC 26687217. (One-volume translated abridgement of the 4 volumes in the above series)
- Íslensk mannanöfn. Nafngjafir þriggja áratuga 1921-1950. Reykjavík, 1960. OCLC 504008990. (Icelandic)
- Eitt tungumál fyrir allan heiminn. Serialized in Morgunblaðið supplement, 1966–67 (Icelandic)

== Sources ==
- "Thorsteinn Thorssteinsson (1889–1979)". Esperanto (in Esperanto) (4). Universal Esperanto Association: 79. 1980.
