= Ragnar Kjartansson (sculptor) =

Icelandic sculptor (1923–1989)

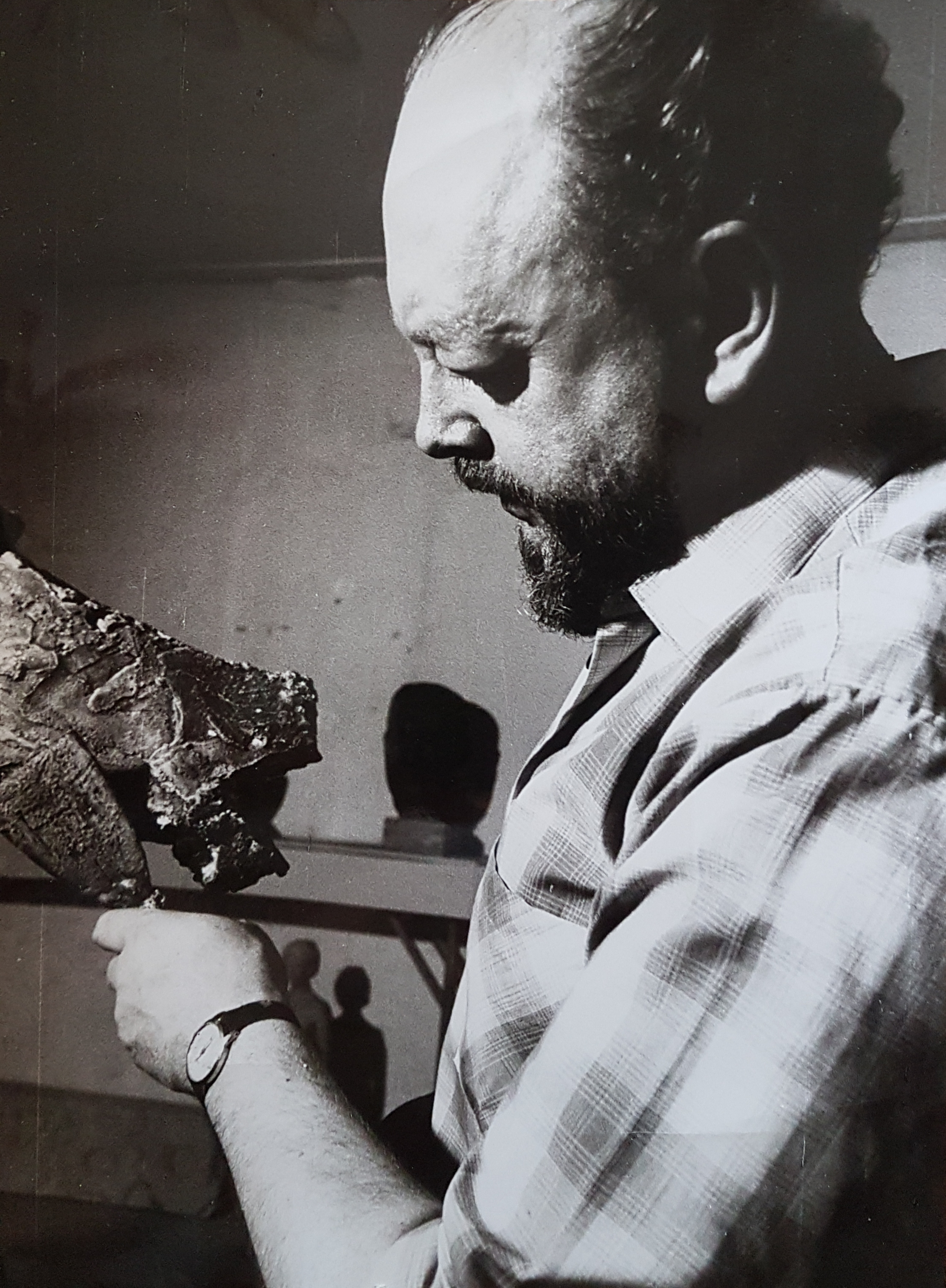
Ragnar Kjartansson, 1972

Ragnar Kjartansson (1923–1989) was an Icelandic sculptor. He was a member of the Icelandic Sculptors Society which he established in the Icelandic capital in 1972 along with Hallsteinn Sigurðsson, Jon Gunnar Árnason, Þorbjörg Pálsdóttir and others. He was also the founder of Glit, Ltd., the only ceramic factory in the country. One of his works is located along the main road in Eskifjördur, commemorating the mariners who drowned at sea.
