= Erla S. Haraldsdóttir =

Icelandic visual artist

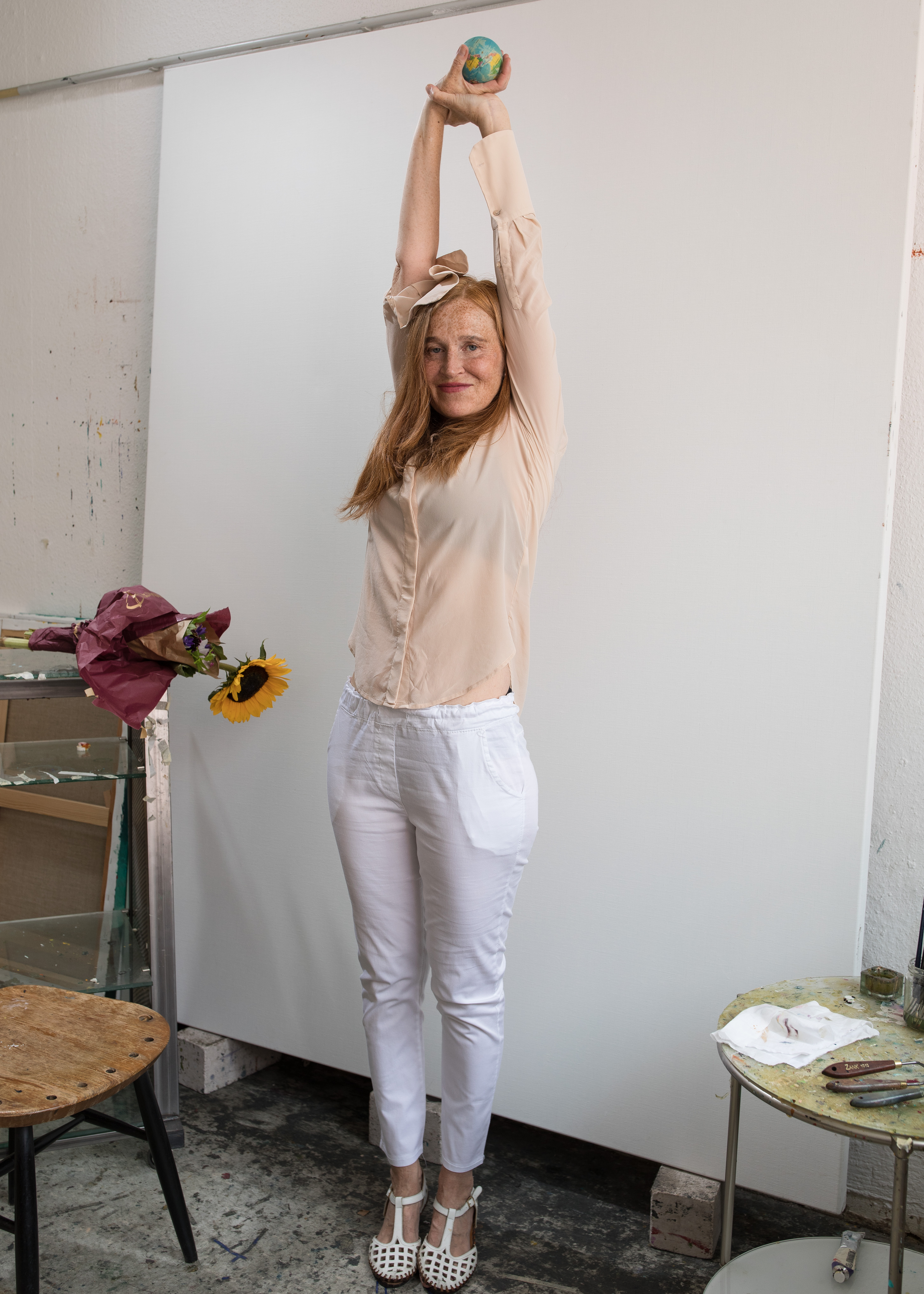
- Education: Valand Academy of Fine Art in Gothenburg, San Francisco Arts Institute, Royal Institute of Art in Stockholm
- Website: https://erlaharaldsdottir.com/

Erla S. Haraldsdóttir (born 1967 in Reykjavik, Iceland) is an Icelandic visual artist primarily working with painting, drawing, printmaking, and photomontage. She is based in Berlin.

== Education and Artistic Work ==
Haraldsdóttir studied at the Academy of Design and Crafts, Gothenburg, Sweden, from 1991 to 1992; Houvedskous Målarskola in Gothenburg from 1992 to 1993; Royal Swedish Academy of Fine Arts in Stockholm, Sweden from 1993 to 1994; the San Francisco Art Institute in California in 1997; and she received her MFA at the Valand Academy of Fine Art in Gothenburg in 1998. Thematically, she employs a narrative-driven approach using cultural symbols and historical motifs, harnessing the physicality of both paint and colour.

She has also served as a guest professor at the Umeå Academy of Fine Arts in Sweden.

Haraldsdóttir uses methodology she calls "freedom of restraint" to help her engage in her work and create a "system" for each artwork that enables her to concretize the project. In an interview, she quoted English poet William Blake to illustrate the idea further:

"I must create a system, or be enslaved by another man's. I will not reason and compare: my business is to create."

Her work has been exhibited in museums and galleries including: Lund Cathedral, The Crypt, (Sweden), Hallgrímskirkja, (Reykjavik, Iceland), Kalmar Konstmuseum (Sweden), Moderna Museet (Stockholm), Akureyri Art Museum (Iceland), Kunstverein Langenhagen (Germany), Bielefelder Kunstverein (Germany), Künstlerhaus Bethanien (Berlin), Berlinische Galerie (Berlin) and the Momentum Biennial of Contemporary Art (Moss, Norway).

In Iceland, her art is featured in public collections at the National Gallery of Iceland, Reykjavík Art Museum, Akureyri Art Museum, and the ASÍ Art Museum. And in Sweden, her public work can be found at the National Public Art Council and Moderna Museet.

Her residencies include the Bag Factory Artists Studio (Johannesburg), Künstlerhaus Bethanien (Berlin), Cité des Arts (Paris), and Ateliers ’89 (Oranjestad, Aruba).

== Exhibitions ==
Haraldsdóttir most recently exhibited at the Neskirkja Church in Reykjavik with a solo show entitled "Tæri," held from 23 June 2024 through 25 August 2024. The exhibition includes Christian iconography, like the large painting, Proclamation of Mary, inspired by Fra Angelico's Annunciation.

She also had an exhibition at the Listasafn Árnesinga art museum entitled "My Mother's Dream," taking place from 2 March 2024 through 25 August 2024. The exhibit focuses on a dream that her great-great-grandmother had as a teenager that describes an encounter with the "hidden people," elves that originate from Icelandic lore. It features sketches and large-format paintings illustrating the dream, as well as a representation of her great-great-grandmother's diary, including blank pages left to be filled. The exhibit ties together with the ideas of Swiss psychologist Carl Gustav Jung on the collective unconscious and archetypal dreams.

Her past exhibition, "Genesis," held at the crypt of Lund Cathedral from 15 July 2017 through 28 August 2017, focuses on the biblical story of creation. She has repeatedly painted the Genesis series, a deep reflection on humanity's relationship to God and its ability to create.

Her recent exhibitions include My Mother’s Dream (Galleri Gudmundsdottir Berlin), Seventh Day, (Icelandic ambassadors residence Berlin), Kaleidoscope, (Reykjavík Art Museum, Iceland) Reflection, (Bag Factory artists studios, Johannesburg, South Africa) 2023, My Mother’s Dream (Norrtälje Konstall, Norrtälje, Sweden) 2021 - 2022, Transformation / Övergångar, (Lund Cathedral, Lund, Sweden) 2021, Reality on canvas (Reykjavik Art Museum, Iced) Art attack, (Bohusläns Art museum, Uddevalla Sweden).

Haraldsdóttir's past exhibitions include Genesis (Galleri Konstepidemin Göteborg) Genesis (Hallgrimskirkja, Reykjavik) Make a Painting of Trees Growing in a Forest (Kalmar Konstmuseum), 2016, Just Painted (Reykjavík Art Museum), Project Metropolis (Silesian Museum, Katowice), 2015, Visual Wandering (Listasafn ASÍ, Reykjavík), 2014, (In)dependent People, Reykjavík Arts Festival, 2012, and Moment-Ynglingagatan 1 (Moderna Museet, Stockholm), 2011.

Together with Bo Melin, Johanna Billing, and Peter Geschwind, Haraldsdóttir was one of the artists behind the non-profit gallery Ynglingagatan 1 in Stockholm, both managing and exhibiting her work there. The gallery became an important meeting place for Swedish and international contemporary artists in the 1990s. In 2011, Moderna Museet hosted the exhibition "Moment - Ynglingagatan 1," aiming to present thoughts and ideas that were in circulation at the time of the gallery's operation.

In 2023, Ynglingagatan 1 and its influential role was again recognized, this time by Bonniers Konsthall with the exhibition "Stuff it - Tur och retur," which included Haraldsdóttir as an exhibitor.

== Publications ==
Haraldsdóttir also has numerous publications in print. They include "My Mother's Dream," published by Arvinius & Orfeus in 2021, "Övergångar" / Transformations, also published by Arvinius & Orfeus in 2021, Patterns of the Family Catalogue, published by ´uns and Listasafn Reykjanesbæjar in 2019, "Make a Painting of Trees Growing in a Forest," published by Crymogea in 2015, and "Difficulty of Freedom / Freedom of Difficulty," also published by Crymogea in 2014.
