= Gufunes =

Park in Reykjavík, Iceland

Coordinates: 64°08′49″N 21°48′45″W

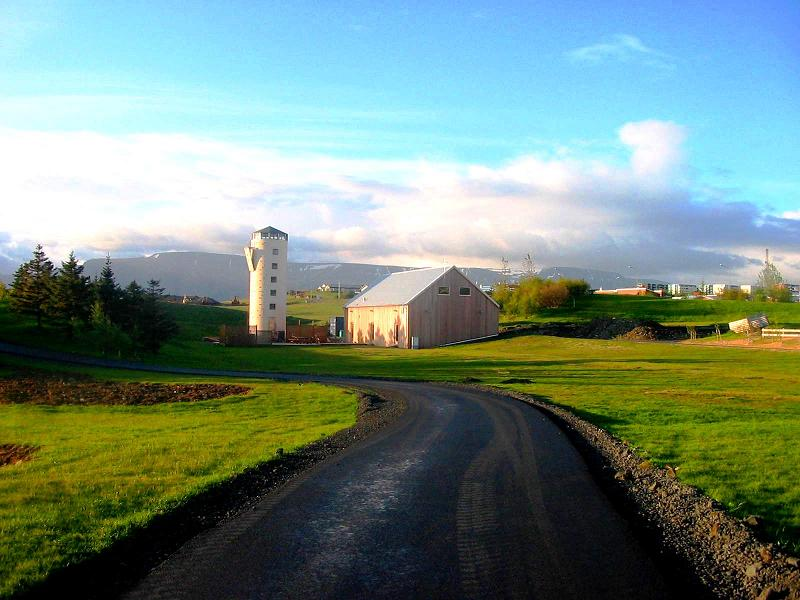

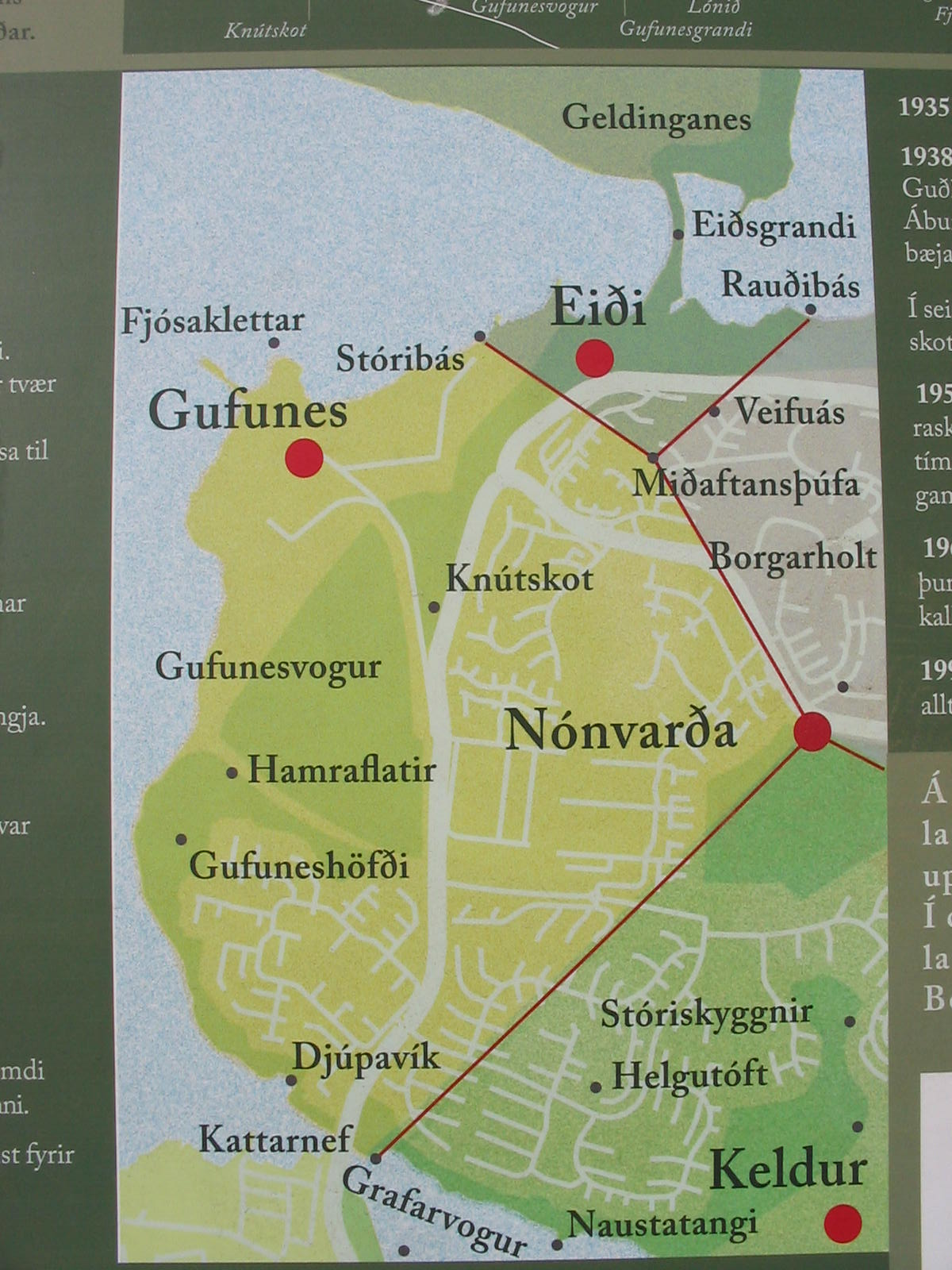
Map

Gufunes (Icelandic pronunciation: [ˈkʏːvʏˌnɛːs]) is a historical estate and park for sculptures and artwork in northeastern Reykjavík. Today it lies within the Grafarvogur part of the city, located to the southwest and south of the Eidsvik Cove and Geldinganes Headland. It contains some 25 sculptures by Hallsteinn Sigurðsson amongst others.

In 2016 an urban design competition has been organized for the future of the Gufunes industry and landscape. jvantspijker and Felixx with Orri Steinarsson won the competition.
