= Gunnlaugsson =

Gunnlaugsson is a surname of Icelandic origin, meaning son of Gunnlaugur. In Icelandic names, the name is not strictly a surname, but a patronymic.

People named Gunnlaugsson include:

- Arnar Gunnlaugsson (born 1973), Icelandic professional football player
- Bjarki Gunnlaugsson (born 1973), Icelandic professional football player
- Björn Gunnlaugsson (1788–1876), Icelandic mathematician and cartographer
- Darryl Gunnlaugson, Canadian curler
- Eyþór Ingi Gunnlaugsson (born 1989), Icelandic singer
- Garðar Gunnlaugsson (born 1983), Icelandic professional football player
- Hrafn Gunnlaugsson (born 1948), Icelandic filmmaker of Viking films
- Sigmundur Davíð Gunnlaugsson (born 1975), Icelandic politician, former Prime Minister
