= Hafnarfjörður =

Town and municipality in Iceland

- Municipality
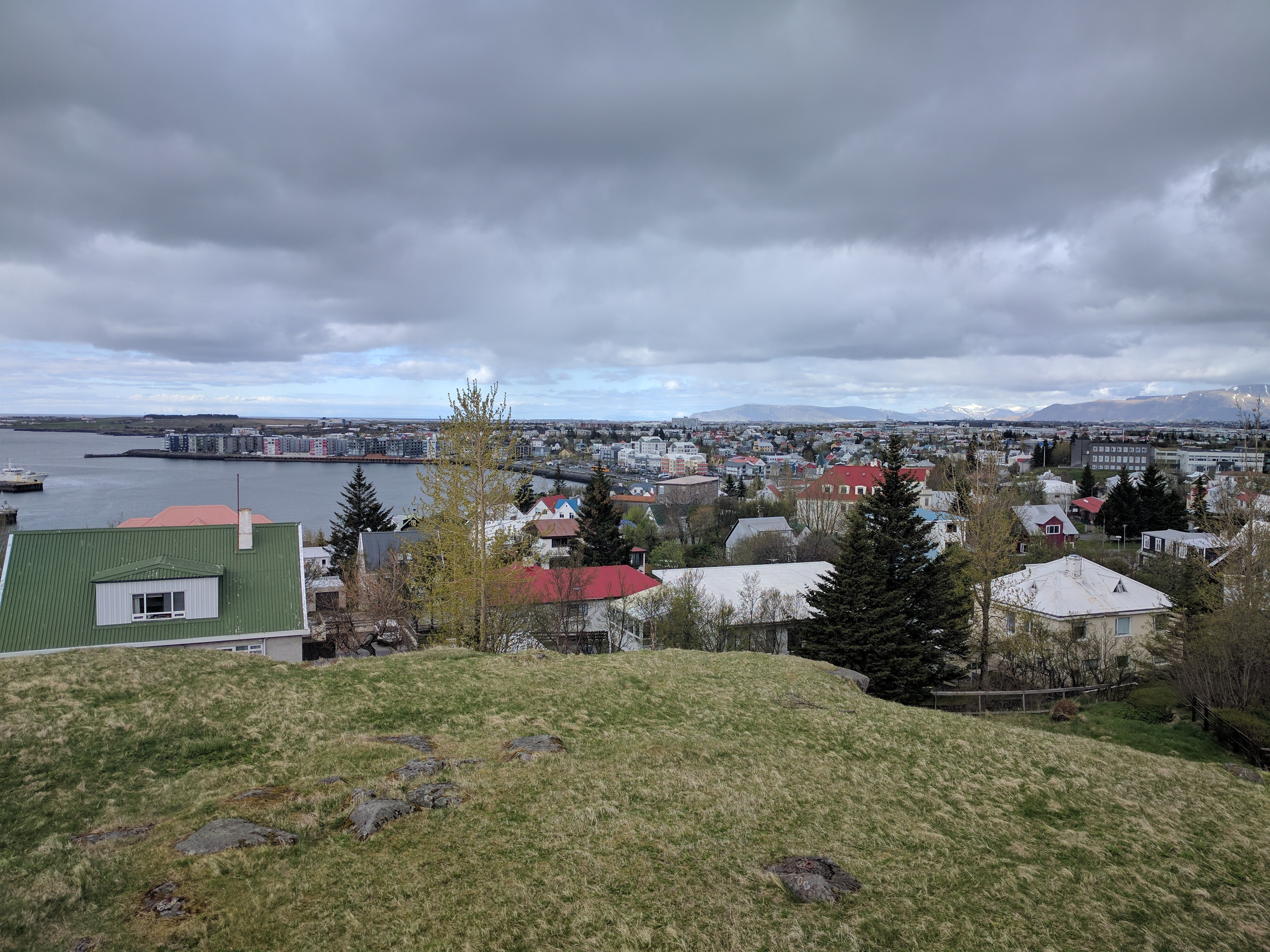
- May 2017 view over Hafnarfjörður's town centre

- Location of the municipality

- Location within Iceland
- Country: Iceland
- Region: Capital Region
- Constituency: Southwest Constituency

Government
  - Mayor: Valdimar Víðisson

Area
  - Total: 174 km^{2} (67 sq mi)

Population (2025)
  - Total: 31,525
  - Density: 181/km^{2} (469/sq mi)
- Demonym(s): Hafnfirðingur, Hafnfirðingar (Icelandic)
- Postal code(s): 220, 221, 222
- Municipal number: 1400
- Website: hafnarfjordur.is

Hafnarfjörður, (Note: Icelandic pronunciation: [ˈhapnarˌfjœrðʏr̥]) officially Hafnarfjarðarkaupstaður, (Note: Icelandic pronunciation: [ˈhapnarˌfjarðarˌkʰœypˌstaːðʏr̥], lit. 'Hafnarfjörður Market Town') anglicised as Hafnarfjorthur, is a port town and municipality in Iceland, located about 10 km (6 mi) south of Reykjavík. The municipality consists of two non-contiguous areas in the Capital Region, on the southwest coast of the country. At about 31,500 inhabitants, Hafnarfjörður is the third-most populous city in Iceland after Reykjavík and Kópavogur. It has established local industry and a variety of urban activities, with annual festival events.

== Activities ==
The town is the site of an annual Viking festival, where Viking culture enthusiasts from around the world display reconstructions of Viking garb, handicraft, sword-fighting and longbow shooting. It takes place in June.

== Local industry ==
Just two kilometres (1.2 miles) outside of Hafnarfjörður is an aluminium smelter, run by Alcan. The smelter was originally built in 1969. Local elections were held in April 2007, where the people of the town voted against extension of the smelter.

The head office of Iceland's national airline, Icelandair, is in this community.

== History ==
Population 1910 - 2020
1910	1,547
1920	2,366
1930	3,591
1940	3,686
1950	5,087
1960	7,160
1970	9,696
1980	12,205
1990	15,151
2000	19,640
2010	25,913
2015	28,200
2020	29,971

Hafnarfjörður takes its name (meaning harbour fjord) from the area's natural harbour. The town is built on top of Holocene lava fields erupted from the nearby Krýsuvík volcanic system, including the 8000-year-old Búrfellshraun and the much younger 2000-year-old Óbrinnishólabruni. There have been no new lava flows on the site since before the Settlement of Iceland, but the Krýsuvík system is still an active volcano, last erupting in 2021 at Fagradalsfjall further to the southwest.

Hafnarfjörður is first named in the medieval Landnámabók, and the earliest reports of voyages to Hafnarfjörður date from the end of the 14th century. Englishmen began trading in Hafnarfjörður in the 15th century, but German merchants followed in their wake and eventually drove the English out. In German documents, Hafnarfjörður was mentioned for the first time in 1391, and in another German document dating from 1486 the place was described as a trading place of merchants from Hamburg for the first time.

The town of Hafnarfjörður became an official member of the Hanseatic League. The first Lutheran church in Iceland was raised at Háigrandi [ˈhauːɪˌkrantɪ], opposite Óseyri [ˈouːsˌeiːrɪ], just outside the small boat harbour in 1533. After that, the Hanseatic traders prevailed in town until 1602, based at Hvaleyri [ˈkʰvaːlˌeiːrɪ]. At this point, the Danish monarchy established a Danish trade monopoly in Iceland which lasted until late in the 18th century. During this period, Hafnarfjörður was the nation's busiest trade centre.

In 1793, Bjarni Sívertsen settled here and became influential in local business and international trade, setting up a major commercial fishing operation. His enterprise and initiative signalled the start of impressive commerce in the town. Ever since, he has been called "the father of Hafnarfjörður" and nicknamed "Sir Bjarni". His house in Vesturgata street, built in 1803, was transformed into a museum (Sívertsenshús).

Around 1870, dramatic changes took place in Icelandic fishing. Residents followed the growing trend in Iceland of using decked boats rather than row-boats. This led to even more employment and rapid growth, and Hafnarfjörður was the fifth town in Iceland to attain official municipal status in 1908. The first mayor was Páll Einarsson, who later became the mayor of Reykjavík. The first road between Reykjavík and Hafnarfjörður was finished in 1898. The first hydrological power plant in Iceland was built in Hafnarfjörður in 1904.

In 1890 Hafnarfjörður had 616 inhabitants and it was one of the largest towns in Iceland. When Hafnarfjörður attained official municipal status on 1 June 1908 it had 1 400 inhabitants. In 1920 Hafnarfjörður had 2 366 inhabitants, in 1940 3 686, in 1960 7 160 and in 1980 12 312.

The Coot, Iceland's first trawler, operated from Hafnarfjörður between 1905 and 1908. Its boiler stands by the roundabout on the junction of Reykjavíkurvegur, Strandgata and Vesturgata. A harbour for large commercial ships was raised in 1912, and the first car arrived in 1913.

After World War II, more advanced trawlers and numerous motorised ships were added to the fleet. The town's first stern trawler appeared in 1973. Today, Hafnarfjörður is one of the nation's largest fishing centres and the site of Iceland's first fish wholesalers' auction market. Through the years, Hafnarfjörður's dynamic local economy has been strongly linked to fishing, although freight transport has recently become the major harbour activity. And now, the town is Iceland's second-ranked import and export harbour. Hafnarfjörður is the third largest town of Iceland, after Reykjavík and Kópavogur.

== Geography ==
=== Climate ===
The climate in Hafnarfjörður is subpolar oceanic climate (Köppen Cfc).

Climate data for Hafnarfjörður (1991-2020, extremes 1951-present)
Month	Jan	Feb	Mar	Apr	May	Jun	Jul	Aug	Sep	Oct	Nov	Dec	Year
Record high °C (°F)	15.9 (60.6)	12.5 (54.5)	16.0 (60.8)	17.0 (62.6)	21.4 (70.5)	23.7 (74.7)	23.8 (74.8)	24.5 (76.1)	19.7 (67.5)	14.5 (58.1)	16.0 (60.8)	12.9 (55.2)	24.5 (76.1)
Mean daily maximum °C (°F)	3.5 (38.3)	3.6 (38.5)	4.5 (40.1)	6.8 (44.2)	9.6 (49.3)	12.2 (54.0)	13.7 (56.7)	13.5 (56.3)	11.2 (52.2)	7.6 (45.7)	4.9 (40.8)	3.5 (38.3)	7.9 (46.2)
Daily mean °C (°F)	1.2 (34.2)	1.2 (34.2)	1.9 (35.4)	4.2 (39.6)	7.0 (44.6)	9.7 (49.5)	11.3 (52.3)	11.1 (52.0)	8.8 (47.8)	5.4 (41.7)	2.7 (36.9)	1.1 (34.0)	5.5 (41.9)
Mean daily minimum °C (°F)	−1.2 (29.8)	−1.2 (29.8)	−0.6 (30.9)	1.5 (34.7)	4.3 (39.7)	7.1 (44.8)	8.8 (47.8)	8.6 (47.5)	6.3 (43.3)	3.1 (37.6)	0.4 (32.7)	−1.3 (29.7)	3.0 (37.4)
Record low °C (°F)	−15.3 (4.5)	−12.2 (10.0)	−18 (0)	−10 (14)	−6 (21)	−1 (30)	1.9 (35.4)	1.4 (34.5)	−5.5 (22.1)	−7.2 (19.0)	−10.7 (12.7)	−17 (1)	−18 (0)
Average precipitation mm (inches)	141.7 (5.58)	136.4 (5.37)	119.9 (4.72)	77.6 (3.06)	77.4 (3.05)	72.1 (2.84)	77.1 (3.04)	112.3 (4.42)	122.6 (4.83)	159.9 (6.30)	121.3 (4.78)	143.6 (5.65)	1,361.9 (53.64)
Source: Météo Climat (precipitation 1981-2010)

== Local festivals ==
=== Bright days ===
Each year in May, the Bright Days festival is held. The events include short movies, concerts and usually conclude on a day commemorating the sailors of Iceland.

=== Viking festival ===
Each year on the summer solstice a Viking festival is held in Hafnarfjörður. A local pub and restaurant, Fjörukráin, started the festival and maintains it to this day.

== Sights ==
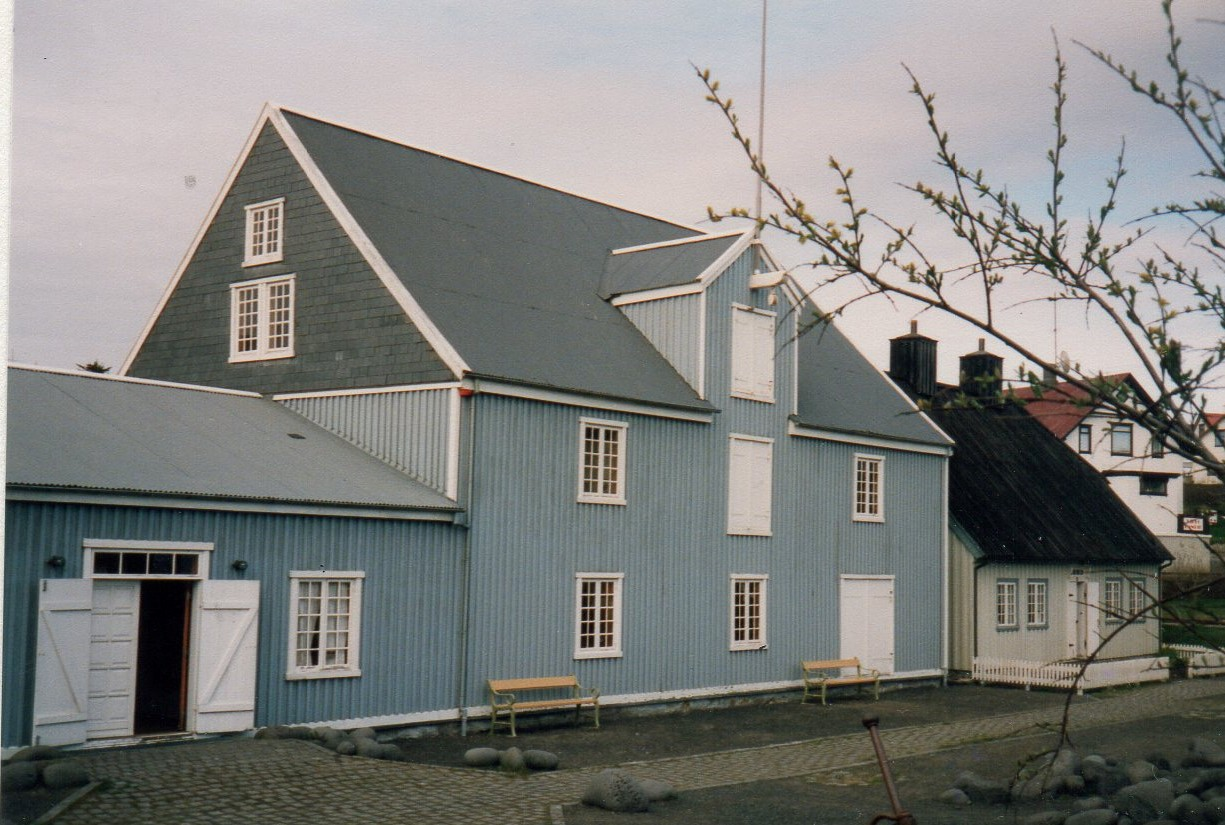
Pakkhúsið (1865, left) and Sívertsenshús (right, 1803)

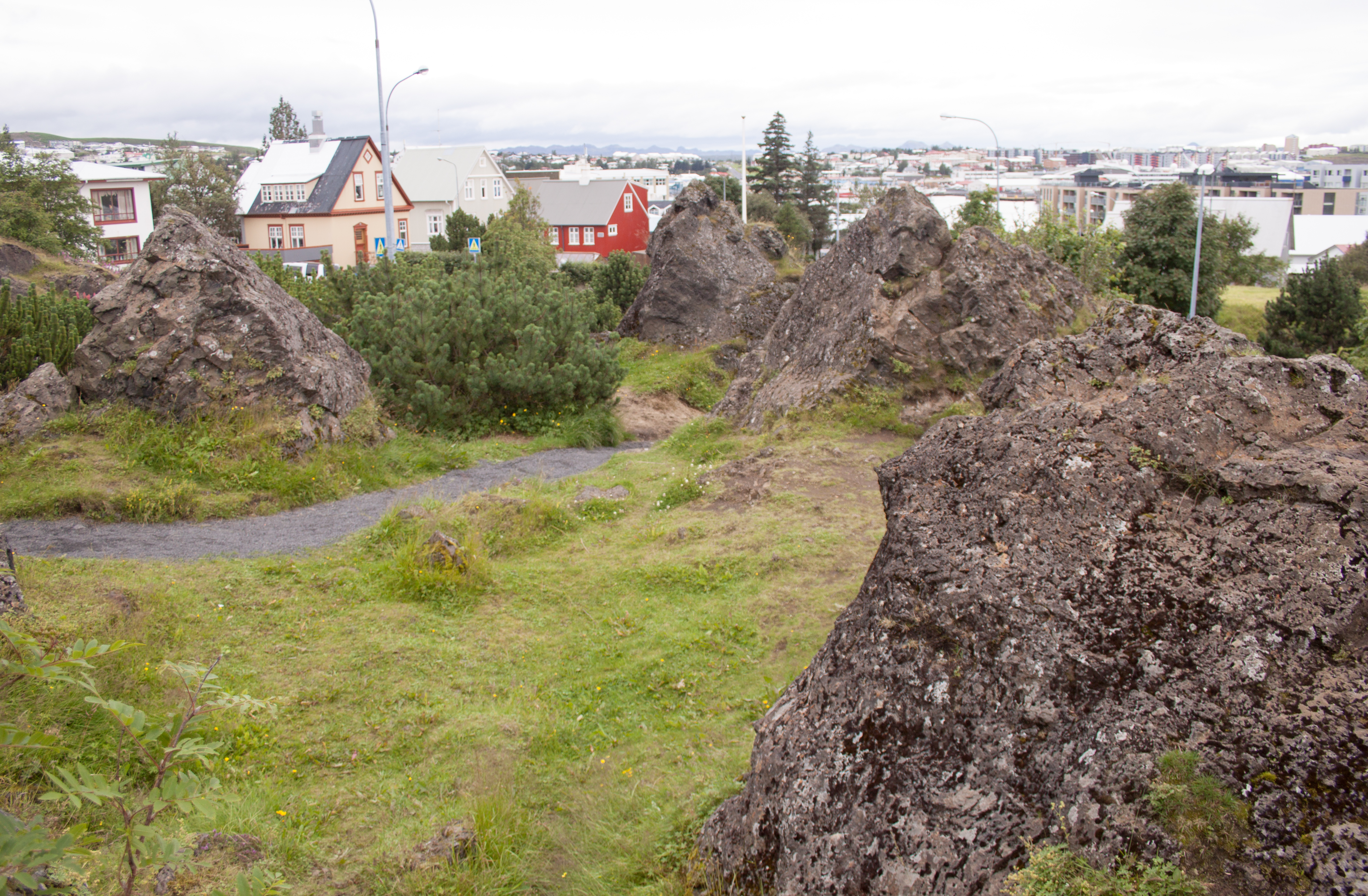
Hellisgerði Park

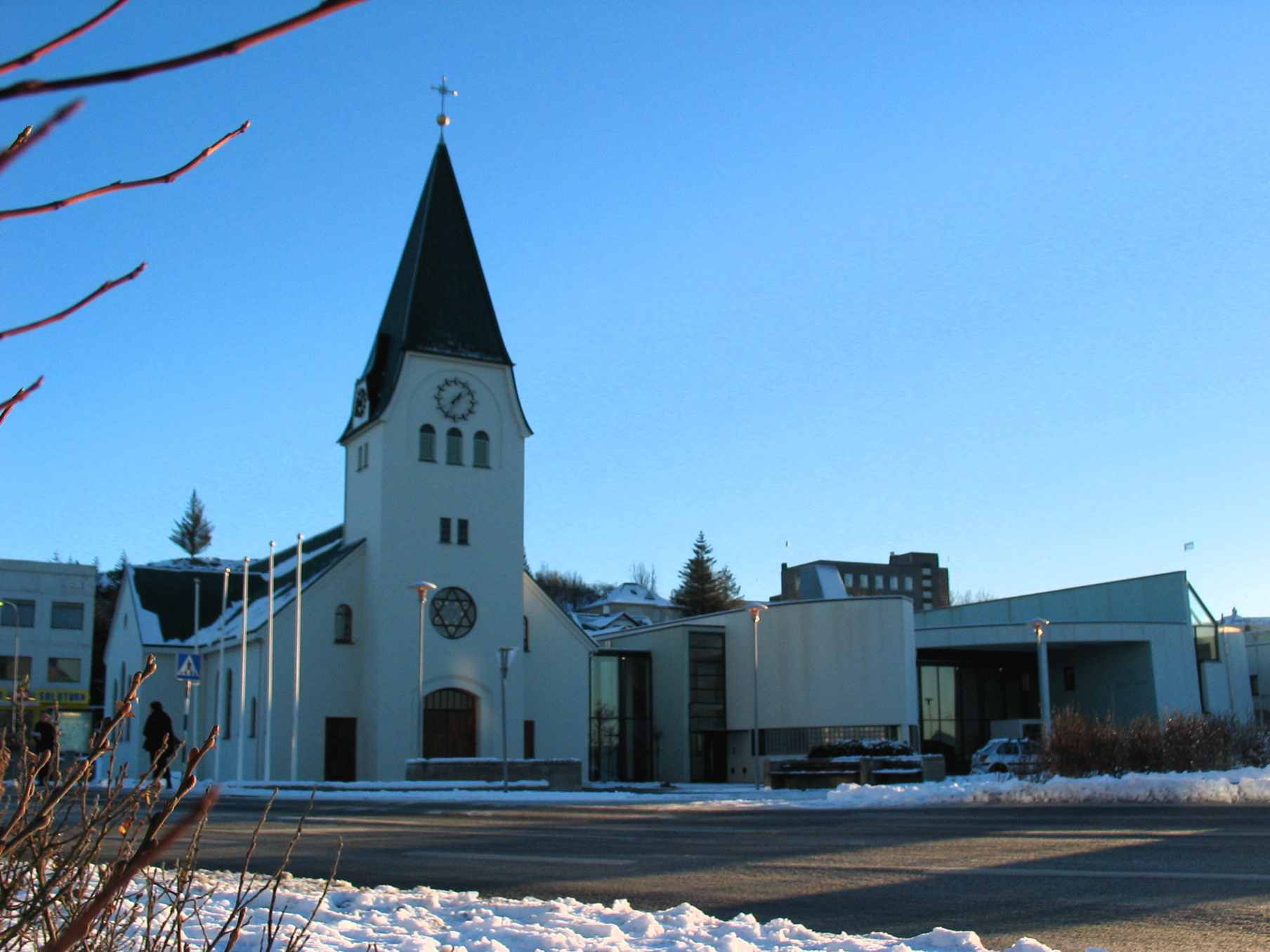
Hafnarfjarðarkirkja, the oldest church in town

There are various old buildings left in the old town centre, e.g. Pakkhúsið [ˈpʰahkˌhuːsɪθ], a store house dating from 1865 which houses the Museum of Navigation (Sjóminjasafn Íslands [ˈsjouːˌmɪnjaˌsapn ˈistlan(t)s]). Sívertsenshús, an old dwelling house built in 1803, is the oldest building in Hafnarfjörður. It is known by the name Hús Bjarna riddara Sívertsen as well and it was transformed into a museum in 1974. Hafnarfjarðarkirkja [ˈhapnarˌfjarðarˌcʰɪr̥ca], the oldest church in town, was consecrated in 1914. Strandgata [ˈstrantˌkaːta] and Fjarðargata [ˈfjarðarˌkaːta] are two old streets in the centre where some historical buildings are preserved. No. 55 of Strandargata is a former wooden store house which was built in 1841 and enlarged in 1880. No. 57 is a wooden residential building dating from 1841.

St. Joseph's Church (Sankti Jósefskirkja [ˈsan̥tɪ ˈjouːsɛfsˌcʰɪr̥ca]), one of the few Roman Catholic churches in Iceland whose parish was founded in 1926, can be visited in the South of the town centre. Karmelklaustur [ˈkʰarmɛlˌkʰlœystʏr̥] is the only Catholic monastery in Iceland. Fríkirkjan í Hafnarfirði [ˈfriːˌcʰɪr̥can iː ˈhapnarˌfɪrðɪ] is a Protestant church built in 1913.

Hafnarborg [ˈhapnarˌpɔrk] is a centre of arts and culture where concerts and exhibitions are organized. Hafnarfjörður boasts its own Municipal Theatre, the Icelandic Museum of Films (Kvikmyndasafn Íslands [ˈkʰvɪːkˌmɪntaˌsapn ˈistlan(t)s]) and a Museum of Telecommunication (Póst- og Símaminjasafnið [ˈpʰoust ɔːɣ ˈsiːmaˌmɪnjaˌsapnɪθ]).

Many Icelanders believe in elves and trolls. Hellisgerði [ˈhɛtlɪsˌcɛrðɪ] is a small park with lava rocks in the centre of the town which is visited by many people believing that elves and trolls reside there. The northernmost Bonsai trees of the world grow in Hellisgerði as well. Víðistaðatún [ˈviːðɪˌstaːðaˌtʰuːn] is a park in the town centre which is famous for its sculptures created by Icelandic and international well-known artists. Víðistaðakirkja [ˈviːðɪˌstaːðaˌcʰɪr̥ca] is a modern church, hemicycle in shape which was inaugurated in the park in 1988. The symbol of Hafnarafjörður is Viti [ˈvɪːtɪ], a lighthouse built around 1900 which can be seen in a residential area on private property.

== Swimming pools ==
Hafnarfjörður has three swimming pools: Suðurbæjarlaug, Ásvallalaug, and Sundhöll Hafnarfjarðar.

== Twin towns – sister cities ==
Hafnarfjörður is twinned with:

- Akureyri, Iceland
- Bærum, Norway
- Cuxhaven, Germany
- Frederiksberg, Denmark
- Hämeenlinna, Finland
- Ilulissat, Greenland
- Juanjui, Peru
- Tartu, Estonia
- Tvøroyri, Faroe Islands
- Uppsala, Sweden

== Sport ==
There are two major sport clubs in Hafnarfjörður: Fimleikafélag Hafnarfjarðar (FH) and Knattspyrnufélagið Haukar.

FH men's and women's football teams have won several national championships. FH have won the Icelandic Handball league in total of 25 times and have won the cup 6 times which makes them the most successful team competing in Icelandic handball.

Haukar were champions in 1943, 2000, 2001, 2003, 2004, 2005, 2008, 2009, 2010 and 2015 and cup holders in 1980, 1997, 2001, 2002 and 2010.

Hafnarfjörður also has a gymnastics club, Fimleikafélagið Björk, established on 1 July 1951.

Local swimming club, Sundfélag Hafnarfjarðar (SH), was established on 19 June 1945. The triathlon club 3SH, is part of the club.

Keilir Golf Club is an 18-hole golf club and course located on the Hvaleyri peninsula.

Iceland Cricket opened the world's northernmost cricket field in 2019 in Hafnarfjörður. At a latitude of 64.07°N, the field broke the record previously held in Umeå, Sweden (63.84°N) by 25 km (15.5 mi). It was officially inaugurated by Prime Minister of Iceland, Katrín Jakobsdóttir.

== In popular culture ==
In the 1986 novel Red Storm Rising by Tom Clancy, the Soviet Union gains a dramatic strategic advantage at the beginning of the war by seizing Iceland with a Guards Airborne division transported secretly by converted freighters. When the US Marine Corps retake Iceland, they initially land at Hafnarfjörður before advancing on Keflavik. Additionally, in the novella, The Odd Saga of the American and a Curious Icelandic Flock, Snorri calls Alex in the middle of the night to tell him that he is passing through Hafnarfjörður and will be picking him up shortly for a trip to Snæfellsnes.

In 2017 a petition calling upon the Icelandic Prime Minister to erect a statue of Stefán Karl Stefánsson in his hometown of Hafnarfjörður “to forever immortalize and honour his amazing legacy” was created. After his death in 2018, there was a surge of signatures. There are now over 528,000 signatures.

== Notable people ==
- Ólafía Einarsdóttir, first Icelandic to earn a degree in archaeology
- Elin Sigurdardottir, two-time Olympic swimmer
- Sveinn Eythorsson, guitarist and software developer
- Guðrún Bjarnadóttir, Miss International 1963
- Logi Geirsson, former handballer
- Ragnheiður Gestsdóttir, children's book author
- Friðrik Dór Jónsson, pop artist
- Jón Jónsson, pop artist
- Rebekka Guðleifsdóttir, photographer, artist
- Ólafur Guðmundsson, handball player
- Hildur Guðnadóttir, Academy Award-winning composer
- Björgvin Halldórsson, musician
- Emil Hallfreðsson, former footballer
- Geir Hallsteinsson, former handballer
- Indie band Jakobínarína
- Jóhanna Guðrún Jónsdóttir (Yohanna) was born in Copenhagen but raised in Hafnarfjörður, she was chosen to represent Iceland at the Eurovision Song Contest 2009 in Moscow, Russia with the song "Is It True?", earning her 2nd place
- Aron Pálmarsson, handballer in THW Kiel
- Sesselja Sigmundsdóttir (born Hafnarfjörður 5 July 1902)
- Gylfi Sigurðsson, footballer currently plays for Danish Superliga club Lyngby
- Sóley (musician), indie pop singer-songwriter
- Stefán Karl Stefánsson, actor, most known for his role as Robbie Rotten on the Icelandic children's TV series, LazyTown
- Þórhallur Sigurðsson, Laddi, actor
- Dagur Dan Þórhallsson, footballer

== Transport ==
Hafnarfjörður is connected to the bus network of Strætó. Also the Borgarlína network, a BRT-system connecting Reykjavik and surrounding area, is under construction.

== See also ==
- List of cities and towns in Iceland
