= Peter Geschwind =

Swedish painter (1966–2021)

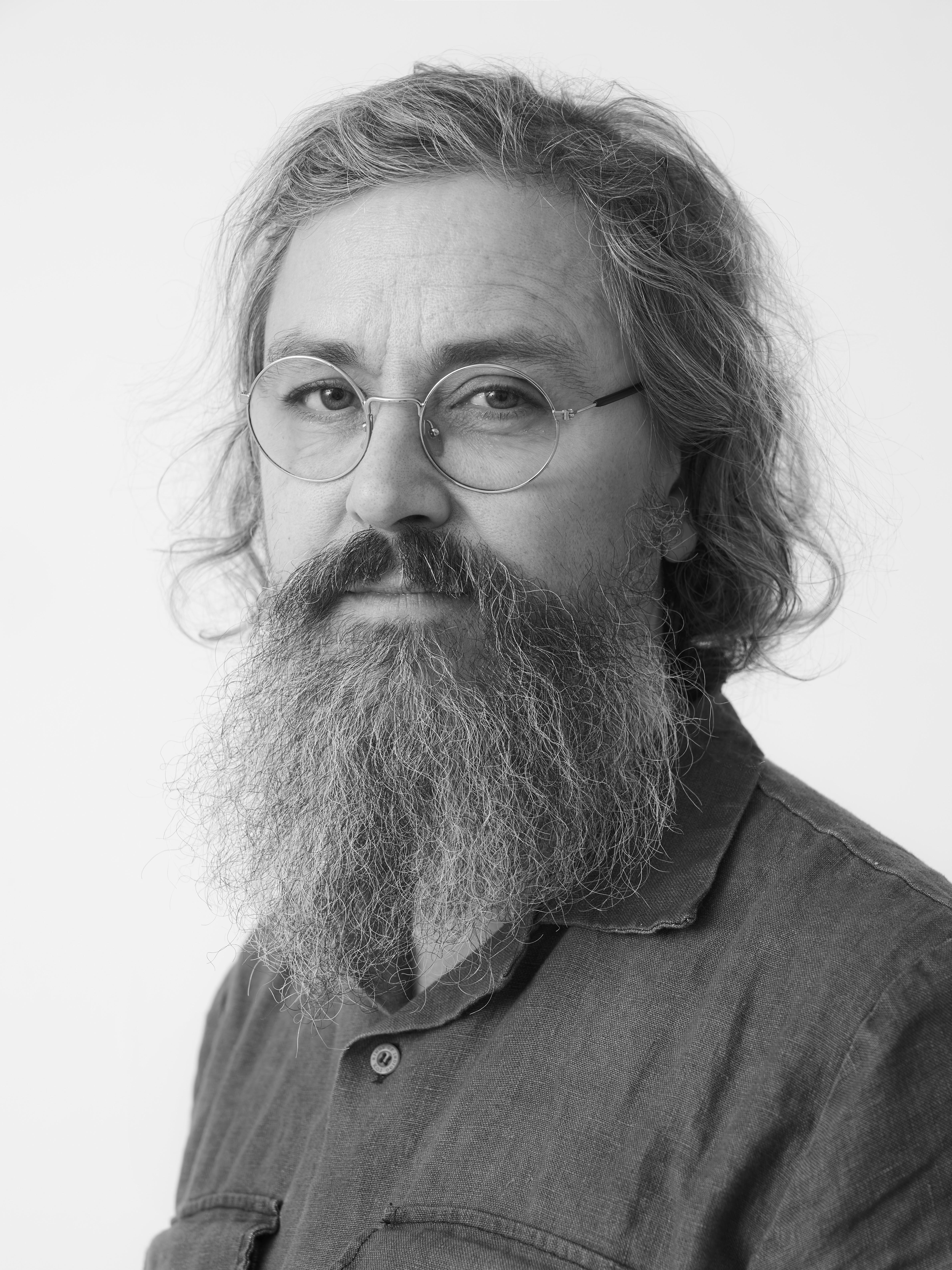

Peter Klingberg Geschwind (1966–2021) was a Swedish contemporary artist based in Stockholm.

He played a pivotal role in artistic developments during the early 1990s. He presented his work in significant exhibitions both in Sweden and internationally, contributing to the reshaping of expression and form. Geschwind was recognized for his ability to blur the lines between artist, producer, and educator, fostering collaboration and creating new combinations of artistry. He delved into a diverse array of materials and techniques, frequently repurposing ordinary objects such as clothing, sneakers, food and beverage packaging and furniture pieces. He reworked these items, bringing them with fresh significance and new layers of meaning. He collaborated closely with artist Gunilla Klingberg, and on several occasions in the 1990s with Thomas Elovsson, as well as Bo Melin.

== Education ==
Geschwind was educated at the Royal Institute of Art (Kungl. Konsthögskolan), Stockholm (1995–1998), and Konstfack, University College of Arts, Crafts and Design, Department of Sculpture, Stockholm (1992–1995). From 2008–2018 he was a professor of fine arts with a focus on sculpture at the Royal Institute of Art (Kungl. Konsthögskolan), where he also was the school’s rector from 2016–2017.

== Work ==
Geschwind was one of the founding members of Ynglingagatan 1 (Y-1), an artist- and curator-run gallery based in Stockholm, which had an impact on contemporary art in the 1990s. Ynglingagatan 1 was an influential hub for art in 1990s Stockholm, playing a crucial role in shaping an active, open artistic attitude. Rooted in the contemporary fascination with art as a reflection of social relations, it adopted a disarming approach that emerged from the interplay with the popular culture of the time.

Geschwind participated in work with Swe.de (the Swedish department at Y-1), which was a group of twelve artists Johanna Billing, Markus Degerman, Ingrid Eriksson, Carina Gunnars, Erla Haraldsdóttir, Karin Johnson, Anna Kindgren, Gunilla Geschwind Klingberg, Bo Melin, Bella Rune, and Christine Ödlund. The group exhibited regularly at the gallery and produced Wednesday happenings as well as group shows like “Stuffit” at Y-1. Their ambition was to present, through different projects, contemporary art from Sweden.

From 2008 to 2018, Geschwind held the position of professor of art, with a specialization in sculpture, at the Royal Institute of Art. As an educator, he used playful forms of learning grounded in the tangible act of creating art within workshops and studios. His educational approach was a counterforce to a rigid and bureaucratic educational system.

In addition to his role as an educator, Geschwind served as acting rector from 2016 to 2017 successfully overcoming the consequences of a devastating large-scale fire that damaged the Institute.

== Art practice ==
Geschwind's artistic methodology is characterized by commitment to expanding the limits of exhibition formats, frequently pioneering mediums rooted in a deep analysis of perception. He drew inspiration from Eadweard Muybridge's photographic series capturing the movement of horses and men, using this as a source of his exploration.

Many of his sculptures had kinetic elements that referenced slap stick. Several of his videos were edited according to the sound, creating a sometimes brutal effect. He developed a distinctive method for crafting "reality animations," employing sound and light to generate animations of real objects within physical space.

His practice moved towards investigating how, with simple means, it is possible to create illusions and visual and auditory effects, turning the inanimate into something animate, experimenting in perception, spatial arrangements and light, adding texture to the experience. In addition, Geschwind's inquiries extended to the mechanisms behind optical illusions and the manipulation of visual reality. This curiosity led him to contemplate the profound implications of altering reality in such a manner. Furthermore, he explored the ways in which technological advancements influence our perceptions and understanding of the surrounding environment. Geschwind’s work is situated between fiction and reality, or more specifically, degrees of reality and different degrees of fiction.

== Private life ==
Peter Geschwind was married to fellow artist and collaborator Gunilla Geschwind Klingberg. They have a son together, Theodor Klingberg Geschwind, who was born in 2006.

== Publications ==
- Gunilla Klingberg, Theodor Ringborg, ed. Peter Geschwind: After Image, (Stockholm, Art And Theory Publishing, 2023).
- Gunilla Klingberg and Peter Geschwind, Trafic, (Linköping, Konsthallen Passagen, 2021), 32.
- Peter Klingberg Geschwind, Theodor Ringborg, Slow Motion, Physical animation with light, Antrepo AB, Stockholm, 2015.
- Lars-Erik Hjertström Lappalainen, “Peter Geschwind’s Phantasmagoria,” text for the exhibition Slow Motion, Gävle Konstcentrum, 2011.
- Niclas Östlind, “The World as Experience and Idea,” text for the exhibition catalogue Automatic, Färgfabriken / Liljevalchs, Stockholm, 2006.
- Boris Kremer, “The Curse of the Humming Fridge,” 2002.
- Maria Lind, “Introduction,” text written for the exhibition catalogue Peter Geschwind, Moderna museet Project, 9.6-14.7 1998, Moderna Museet, Stockholm, 1998.
- Daniel Birnbaum, “Twist and Shout,” SIKSI #3-4, 1998.
- Dennis Dahlqvist, “Peter Geschwind: Inside Out You Turn Me,” Text written for the exhibition catalogue Peter Geschwind, Moderna museet Project, 9.6-14.7 1998, Moderna Museet, Stockholm, 1998.
