= Einar Jónsson from Foss =

Icelandic painter

Einar Jónsson (April 19, 1863 – November 5, 1922) was an Icelandic painter. He had the same name as his contemporary, sculptor Einar Jónsson, also from south Iceland.

He was born on the farm Foss in Myrdal.

He studied at the Royal Academy in Copenhagen either 1893 or 1894. The subjects of his pictures are mostly the landscapes of his home country.
