= Ásgrímur Jónsson =

Icelandic painter (1876–1958)

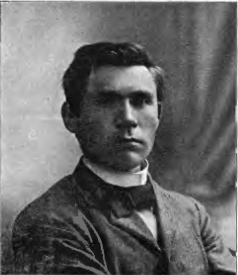
Ásgrímur Jónsson (1906)

Ásgrímur Jónsson (March 4, 1876 – April 5, 1958) was an Icelandic painter, and one of the first in the country to make art a professional living.

He studied at the Royal Academy in Copenhagen between 1900 and 1903 and traveled widely after graduation. The subjects of his pictures are mostly the landscapes of his home country, particularly mountains. His painting style is similar to the French impressionists like Corot. Some of his pictures also illustrate Icelandic sagas and folk tales.

He was also noted for his murals in various churches in Iceland. A number of his works are on display in the National Gallery of Iceland. Ásgrímur influenced many artists in Iceland including Jóhannes Sveinsson Kjarval. A short time before he died he donated his house at No. 74, Bergstaðastræti, Reykjavík to the Icelandic Government along with all those paintings which were at that time in his possession. These consisted of 192 oil paintings and 277 water colours together with a great number of unfinished pictures dating from various periods in his life. His house is now the Ásgrímur Jónsson Collection, part of the National Gallery of Iceland.

During his lifetime Ásgrímur was honoured in many ways. He was made honorary professor at the University of Iceland and, in 1933 he was made Grand Knight of the Icelandic Order of the Falcon. He was an honorary member of the Royal Swedish Academy of Arts and Knight of Dannebrog, first class.

He died in 1958 and was buried on the cemetery of Gaulverjabæjar Church in Flóahreppur.
