= Aldo Manos =

Italian diplomat (1933–2024)

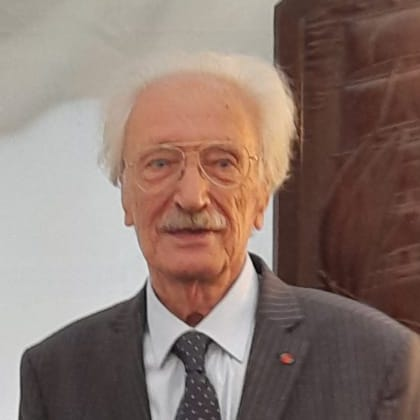
- Born: 3 April 1933
- Died: June 2024 (aged 91)
- Occupations: Diplomat; Professor; Author

Aldo Manos (3 April 1933 – June 2024) was an Italian diplomat, academic and author. He was a founding member of UNEP and the United Nations office located in Kenya.

== United Nations career ==
In 1962 joined the United Nations Secretariat in New York as an Associate Professional Officer P-2 in the Division of Public Administration, where he was responsible for the OPEX Program. Promoted to P-3 he took over as desk officer for Cambodia, Laos, and Vietnam in the Bureau of Technical Assistance Operations(BTAO).

On 4 October 1965, a small number of Italian Secretariat staff were presented to H.H. Pope Paul VI, at His request. In 1967 became Chief of the Technical Assistance Co-ordination Unit at the UN Regional Commission for Asia and the Far East (ECAFE) in Bangkok where he supervised a team of regional consultants and several regional projects, among them the Asian Highway, the distant precursor of the Chinese Belt and Road Initiative In Bangkok, he was promoted to the Senior Officer level (P-5).

In 1972 chosen by Maurice Strong for his team to run the United Nations Conference on the Human Environment (UNCHE) in Stockholm, where he was a liaison officer with the Western European and Others Group (WEOG). In 1973 transferred to the newly created United Nations Environment Program (UNEP) in Nairobi as Chief of the Program Management Division, later deputy director (D-1) of the Environment Fund. In 1977 represented UNEP at the World Peace Council meeting in Sofia, Bulgaria. On 7 May 1980 was presented to H.H. Pope John Paul II during His first Pastoral Visit to Kenya, by the Apostolic Nuncio.

In 1980 became UNEP Acting Director for Europe in Geneva, and in 1982 was appointed first Co-ordinator (D-2) of the Mediterranean Action Plan in Athens. During his tenure, the secretariat of the 1976 Barcelona Convention for the protection of the Mediterranean Sea against pollution grew from a few staff members to encompass four regional specialized offices in Malta, Split, Tunisia, and Sophia Antipolis (France), with a staff of fifty, entirely financed by the twenty-one Mediterranean coastal States.

In 1990 represented UNEP at the first Conference on Environmental Management of Enclosed Coastal Seas – EMECS 90 at Kobe, Japan.

In 1991 took early retirement after a 29-year career.

== Post U.N. career ==
Appointed Professor of Ecology and Environmental Diplomacy at the School of International and Diplomatic Sciences, University of Trieste, Gorizia campus for the maximum three-year period (1994–1997).

Manos died from a brief illness in June 2024, at the age of 91.

== Honours ==
Knight of the Order of Merit (27 December 1969) Knight of the Order of the Star of Italy (9 December 2020) Recipient of the “Uomo del Mare” (Man of the Sea) award of the Italian Naval League – Agrigento Porto Empedocle (1983)

== Publications ==
- Manos, Aldo. G. and Sibanda, B. (1999). In-depth Evaluation of the Regional Activity Centre for Priority Actions Programme (PAP/RAC), Nairobi, UNEP, Evaluation and Oversight Unit
- Manos, Aldo. Evaluation and Oversight Unit (1999): Management Study on Trust Funds and Counterpart Contributions; UNEP, Nairobi
- Manos, Aldo. Campo 360 Ndarugu (1919): Licosia Publisher, Italy
- Manos, Aldo. Early Italian Contributions to the building of modern Kenya, (2020), Comites, Nairobi
