= Rebekka Guðleifsdóttir =

Icelandic photographer (born 1978)

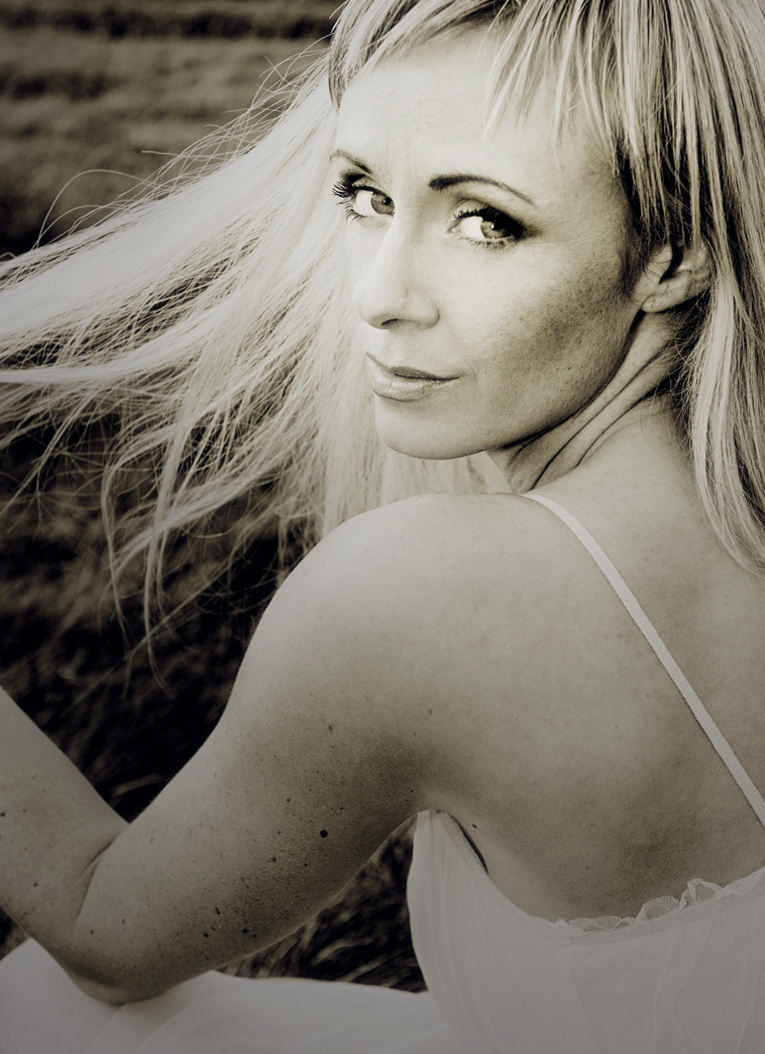
- Born: 1978; Iceland
- Occupation: Photographer
- Known for: Photography

Rebekka Guðleifsdóttir (born 1978) is a photographer from Iceland who was named the "Web's Top Photographer" by the Wall Street Journal on 29 July 2006.

== Biography ==
She lived in Gainesville, Florida from age 4 to age 11. She currently lives in Hafnarfjörður, near Reykjavík, Iceland. Her Flickr images led to her creating and appearing in a Toyota advertising campaign.

Her posted images at Flickr were copyrighted, but then sold by a third party without her consent. "Only Dreemin" sold 60 prints, of seven of her photos, for more than £2,500. She protested by putting up a photo at Flickr named "Only Dreemin" and had text telling of the illegal sale, but Flickr removed it saying users cannot "harass, abuse, impersonate, or intimidate others". Since then, the thread was put back online by Flickr and Guðleifsdóttir received an official apology.

In 2014 her book Moodscapes was published. It details the art of capturing fine art landscape photography, and features images in her signature style including some self-portraits.
