= Kristin E. Hrafnsson =

Icelandic artist

Kristin E. Hrafnsson (born 1960 in Ólafsfjörður) is an Icelandic visual artist, currently resident in Reykjavík. He has works displayed both indoors and outdoors in public and private museums throughout Iceland. Beyond Iceland, Hrafnsson's work has also appeared in Denmark, Germany, and Hungary. Hrafnsson was responsible for producing the 2000 visual art piece Iceland's Bell currently an important feature of the University of Akureyri.
