= Icelandic Art Center =

Coordinates: 64.1479°N 21.9377°W

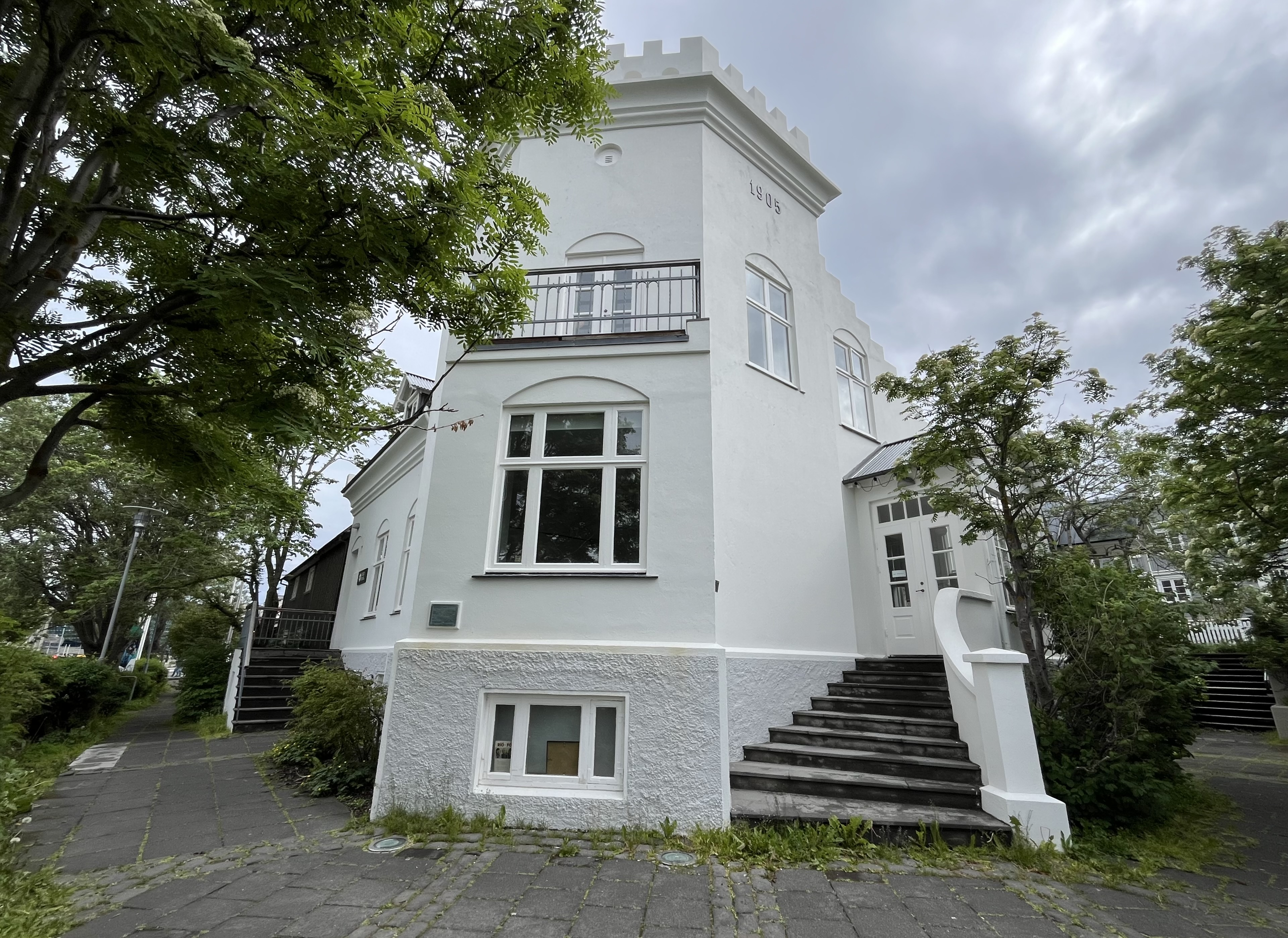
Icelandic Art Center

The Icelandic Art Center (Icelandic: Kynningarmiðstöð íslenskrar myndlistar, pronounced [ˈcɪnːiŋkarˌmɪðˌstœːð ˈistlɛnskrar ˈmɪntˌlɪstar̥]; IAC) is the platform for Icelandic visual art activities. IAC promotes Icelandic art by connecting the local visual art community with the international art network. IAC enforces national and international collaborations in order to improve opportunities for Icelandic artists in their home country and to increase their visibility abroad.

Its main objectives are to provide an information center; promote Icelandic art and mediation to international art events; commission the Icelandic Pavilion at Venice Biennale; initiate exhibitions and conference; and have a visitor program. In 2007, Frida Bjørk Ingvarsdóttir was the chairwoman of the IAC.

The Icelandic Art Center was founded in 2005. In 2025, it is located at Austurstræti 5 in Reykjavík.

On 1st December 2025, a new director, Cecilie C. Ragnheiðardóttir Gaihede, will run the center.

== See also ==
- Culture of Iceland
- Sequences Art Festival
