= Sequences Art Festival =

Sequences Real Time Art Festival is an independent biennale, established in Reykjavík, Iceland in 2006.

== Concept ==
An offspring of the dynamic art scene that thrives in Reykjavík, Sequences is the first art festival in Iceland to focus on visual art alone. The aim of the festival is to produce and present progressive visual art with special focus on time-based mediums, such as performance, sound art, video and public interventions. New artistic directors are hired to reshape each edition of Sequences according to their vision, making it unique and different every time.

== History ==
Sequences is a not-for-profit art organisation. It was founded by four artist-run venues: The Living Art Museum (also known as Nýló), Kling & Bang Gallery, The Dwarf Gallery and Gallery Bananananas (closed since 2007), as well as the Center for Icelandic Art (CIA.IS, now known as the Icelandic Art Center). Today, the festival is co-run by Kling & Bang Gallery, The Living Art Museum (Nýló), and the Icelandic Art Center. Each of them has one representative on the board, but all the major venues and cultural institutions in the greater-Reykjavík area have worked with the festival in one way or another. The first festivals in 2006-2008 were annual, but in 2009 it was decided to slow the pace and hold the festival every other year. More than three hundred artists from around the world have participated in the festival, along with the artist-run galleries, the bigger museums and institutions in Iceland.

== Editions ==
=== Sequences I ===
The first edition took place in 2006 in different locations in the city center of Reykjavík, accompanied by exhibitions and video / film nights. A total of 140 participants from 20 different countries showed their artwork at the festival.

=== Sequences II ===
The second edition took place in 2007.

=== Sequences III ===
For Sequences Art Festival in 2008 (held October 11 to 17) the curatorial board decided to acknowledge renowned artists for their notable contribution to real-time art mediums. The honorary artist of Sequences 2008 was the Icelandic artist Rúrí.

=== Sequences IV ===
The fourth Sequences Art Festival was held in 2009 (October 31 to November 7, 2009). The festival's honorary artist was the 80-year-old concept art legend Magnús Pálsson. Born in East-Iceland in 1929, Pálsson studied theatre design and art in the early 1950s and became an active participant in Iceland's embryonic avant-garde, collaborating with alternative theatre groups as well as with other artists such as Dieter Roth and later the SÚM-group of young artists that formed in 1965.

=== Sequences V ===
The fifth edition took place in 2011. The festival's honorary artist was Hannes Lárusson.

=== Sequences VI ===
The 2013 edition was curated by Markús Þór Andrésson. The festival's honorary artist was Grétar Reynisson.

=== Sequences VII – Plumbing ===
The 2015 edition was curated by Alfredo Cramerotti. The festival's honorary artist was Carolee Schneemann.

=== Sequences VIII – Elastic Hours ===
The 2017 edition was curated by Margot Norton. The festival's honorary artist was Joan Jonas.

=== Sequences IX – Really ===
The 2019 edition was curated by Ingólfur Arnarsson and Hildigunnur Birgisdóttir. The festival's honorary artist was Kristinn Guðbrandur Harðarson.

=== Sequences X – Time Has Come ===
The 2021 edition is curated by Þóranna Dögg Björnsdóttir and Þráinn Hjálmarsson. The festival's honorary artist is Elísabet Jökulsdóttir.

== See also ==
- Icelandic Art Center
- The Living Art Museum (Nýló)
