= Jóhannes Sveinsson Kjarval =

Icelandic painter (1885–1972)

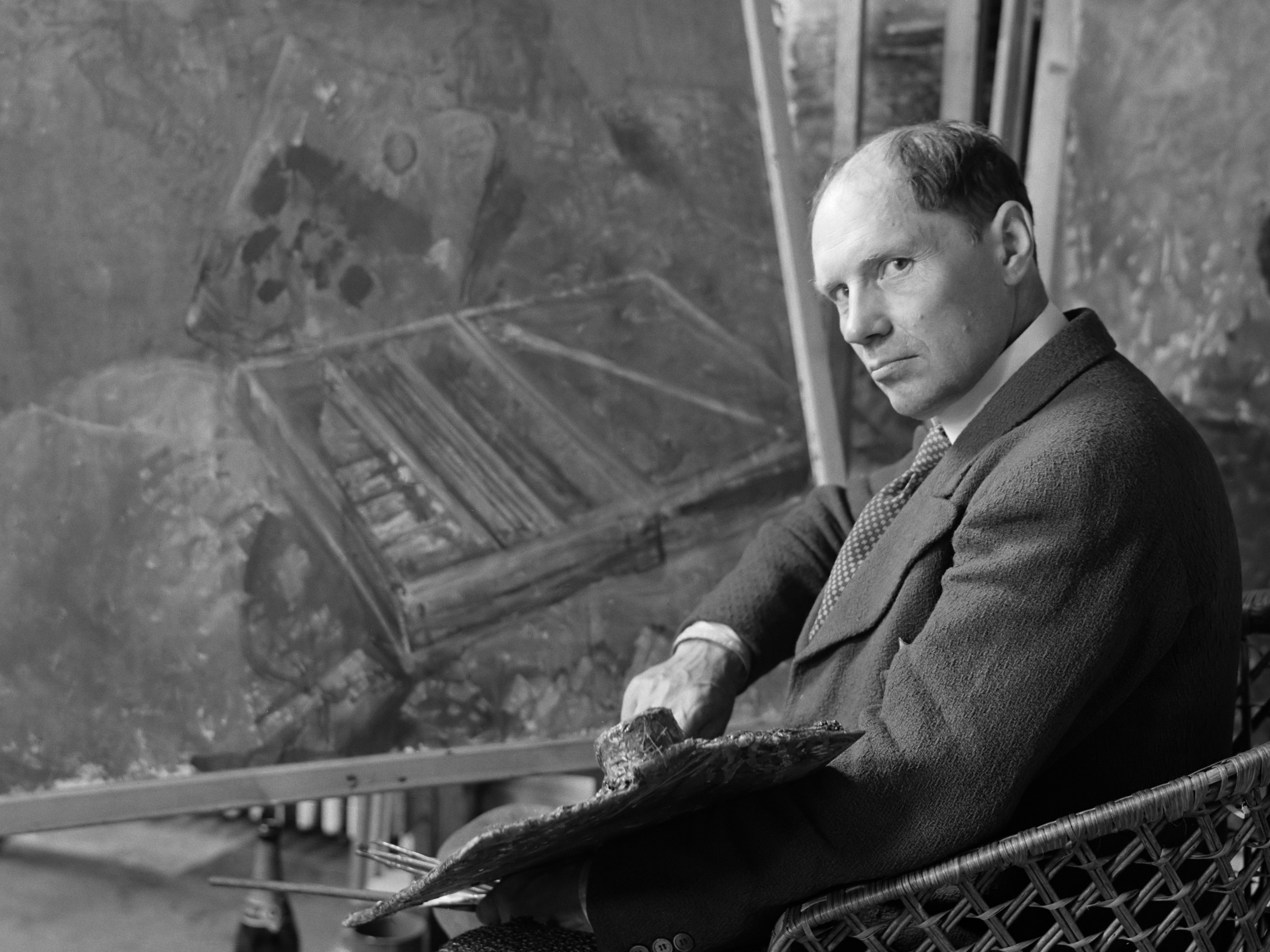
Jóhannes Sveinsson Kjarval (1934).

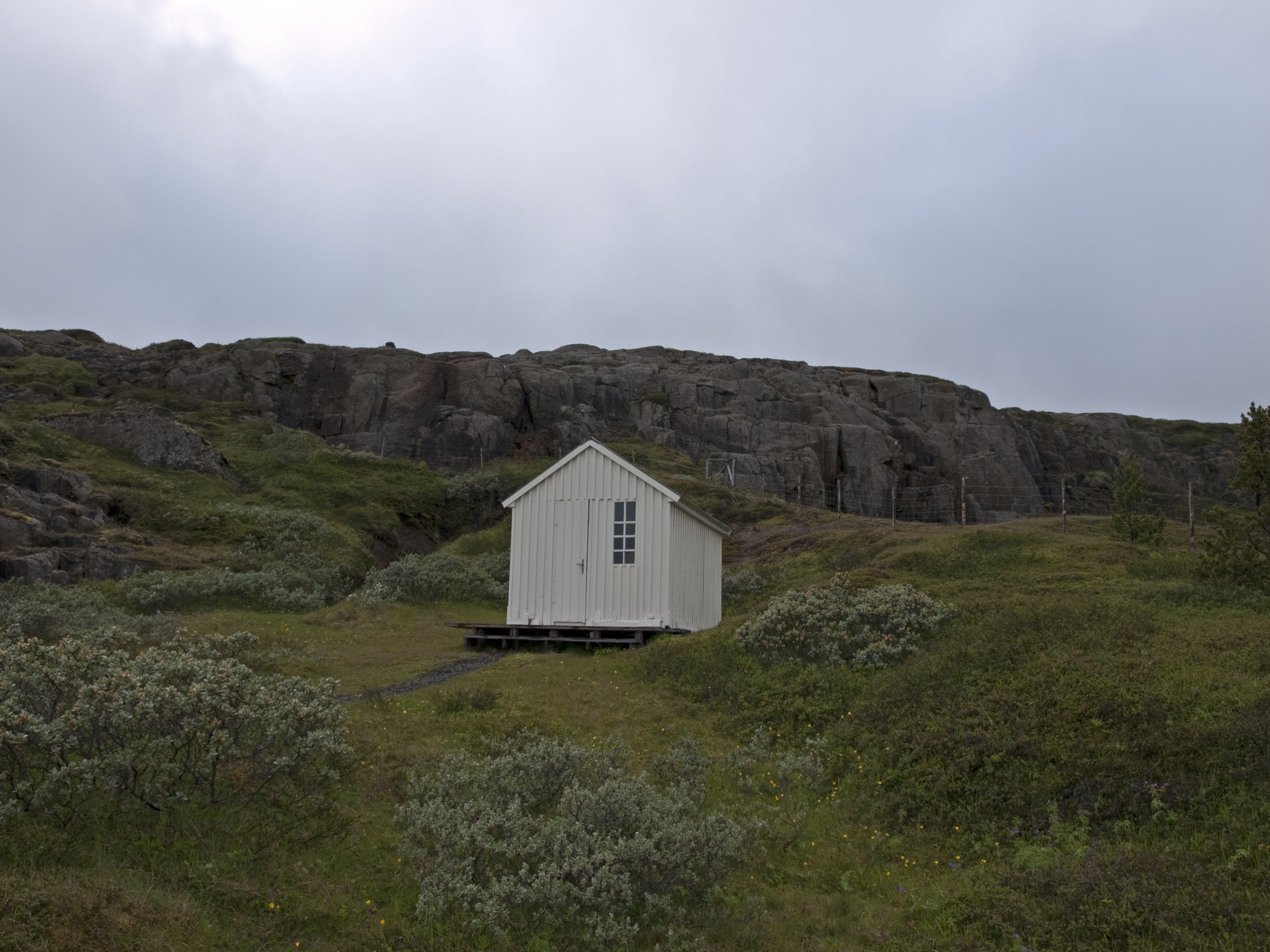
The hut in northeastern Iceland by the Selfljót River, where Kjarval spent summers.

Jóhannes Sveinsson Kjarval (15 October 1885 – 13 April 1972) was an Icelandic painter. He is considered one of the most important artists of Iceland. His son is interior designer Sveinn Kjarval.

== Early life ==
Born into poverty, Kjarval was adopted and as a young man worked as a fisherman. He spent his spare time drawing and painting, and learned basic skills from artist Ásgrímur Jónsson. At age 27, with financial support from fishermen and the Icelandic Confederation of Labour, he passed an entrance examination and was admitted to the Royal Danish Academy of Fine Arts, where he completed his studies. During his time in Copenhagen, he became acquainted with various styles including Impressionism, Expressionism, and Cubism, as well as becoming an accomplished draughtsman. Later, he also took trips to France and Italy.

== Style ==
Kjarval was a prolific painter, leaving thousands of drawings and paintings. The paintings vary greatly in style and frequently mix different styles. Although not surreal, some of his works include absurd and symbolist elements, mixing elves and myths into landscape. Many of his works include Icelandic landscapes and lava formations but many of his landscape paintings are partially "cubist" and abstract with his focus on the closest ground rather than the mountains in the background. Later in his life his art frequently also included abstract painting. In 1958, he was awarded the Prince Eugen Medal by the King of Sweden.

== Legacy ==
- In Reykjavík, one of three buildings belonging to the Reykjavík Art Museum is called Kjarvalsstaðir and presents Kjarval's works alongside temporary exhibitions.
- He is depicted on the Icelandic 2000 króna banknote.
- The 1977 debut album Björk by Björk includes an instrumental flute tribute to Kjarval, written and performed by Björk

== See also ==
- List of Icelandic visual artists
