= Gunnlaugur Scheving =

Icelandic artist

- Born: 8 June 1904; Reykjavik, Iceland
- Died: 9 September 1972 (aged 68)
- Movement: Social realism, figurative art

Gunnlaugur Óskar Scheving (8 June 1904 – 9 September 1972) was an Icelandic artist. He was one of Iceland's leading figurative painters and social realist painters of the 20th century. His art was part of a 1930s movement which broke with the tradition of landscape painting carried over from the turn of the century. Gunnlaugur's art focussed on working people, especially fishermen at sea and figures in rural settings.

== Biography ==
Gunnlaugur Óskar Scheving was born on 8 June 1904 in Reykjavik. At the age of 5, Scheving's parents sent him to foster care first in Unaós in East Iceland and later Seyðisfjörður. At the age of sixteen, he returned to Reykjavík to work for his uncle, the editor and poet Þorsteinn Gíslason, and to study drawing with Icelandic sculptor Einar Jónsson.

In 1923 he went to Copenhagen to study at the art academy there, and while preparing for admission, he lived in sculptor and artist Nína Sæmundsson's house, who lived in Italy at the time. After failing to secure a summer job in Denmark, he returned home to Reykjavík where he stayed until 1925. He returned to the academy and after graduating in 1930, Scheving moved to Seyðisfjörður and held exhibitions in Reykjavík.

He wrote as an art critic for the Morgunblaðið newspaper.

He married Grete Linck, a fellow student from Copenhagen, with whom he held joint exhibitions.
