= Jón Stefánsson (artist) =

Icelandic landscape artist

Jón Stefánsson (1881–1962) was Iceland's first modern landscape artists and one of the founders of modern art in Iceland.

He was born in 1881 in Sauðárkrókur. As a student he first studied engineering in Copenhagen, before turning in 1903 to art. He studied at the Teknisk Selekb Skole and at Kristian Zahrtmann's school before meeting Jean Heiberg in Norway in 1908. Together with Henrik Sørensen and Gösta Sandels they went to Paris to study under Matisse. In 1919 Jón's work was exhibited in the Kunstnernes Efterårsudstilling in the Den Frie Udstilling in Copenhagen.

The National Gallery of Iceland has a large collection of Jón Stefánsson's work.
