= National Gallery of Iceland =

National art museum in Reykjavík, Iceland

- Listasafn Íslands
- Established: 1884
- Location: Reykjavík, Iceland
- Coordinates: 64°08′38.80″N 21°56′21.30″W
- Website: http://www.listasafn.is

The National Gallery of Iceland (Icelandic: Listasafn Íslands [ˈlɪstaˌsapn ˈistlan(t)s]) is an art museum in Reykjavík which contains a collection of Icelandic art. The gallery features artwork of famous Icelandic artists and artwork that helps explain the traditional Icelandic culture.

== History ==
The National Gallery of Iceland was founded in 1884 in Copenhagen, Denmark, by Björn Bjarnarson. The collection consisted of donated artwork, mainly by Danish artists.

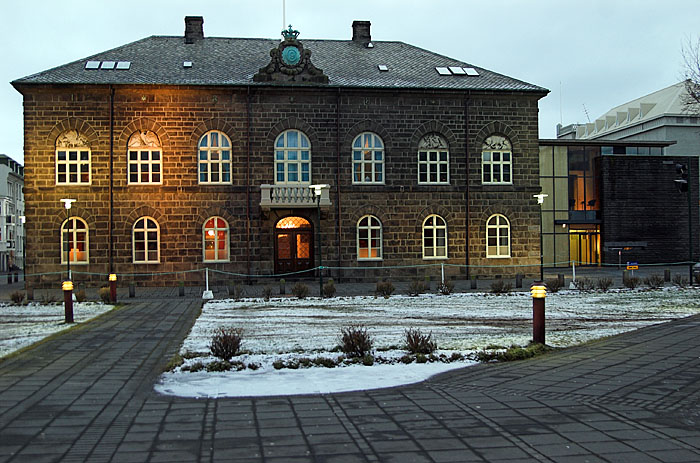
The Alþingishús, where the collections were on show until 1950

The museum remained an independent institution from its inception in 1884 until 1916 when the Althing (the Icelandic Parliament) decided to make it a department of the National Museum of Iceland. In 1928 a law was passed in the Althing on the Council of Culture, and under that law the National Gallery came under the supervision of the council.

The collection was on display at the Alþingishús (the House of Parliament) from 1885 until 1950 when it was transferred to the building of the National Museum of Iceland on Suðurgata (street) in Reykjavík. There the collection was formally opened to the public in 1951, and in 1961 a law was passed making the museum fully independent.

In 1987 the collection was moved again to Fríkirkjuvegur 7. The main building was erected as a freezing plant in 1916, designed by Icelandic architect Guðjón Samúelsson. A later addition to the building is the work of architect Garðar Halldórsson.

The gallery holds 16,000 works in three different locations. In 2023, several works owned by the gallery went under inspection as supposed forgeries.

In 2024, the country proposed a redevelopment of the gallery.

== Exhibitions ==
National Gallery of Iceland holds rotating exhibitions that reflect its collection or display work by individual artists, Icelandic as well as foreign ones. A variety of pieces from the National Gallery's collection are displayed in the first phase of the exhibition Millenium at the Culture House.

The National Gallery's building at Fríkirkjuvegur 7 houses several exhibition halls on three floors, an art store, and a café.

The National Gallery's offices are situated on Laufásvegur 12, adjacent to the exhibition halls. The same building houses a restoration laboratory and a specialist library containing archives, documentation, and photographs.

The National Gallery's library is a research library that emphasizes the preservation and the dissemination of material that relates to Icelandic art.

National Gallery of Iceland

== See also ==
- List of national galleries
