= Kári Stefánsson =

Icelandic neurologist (born 1949)

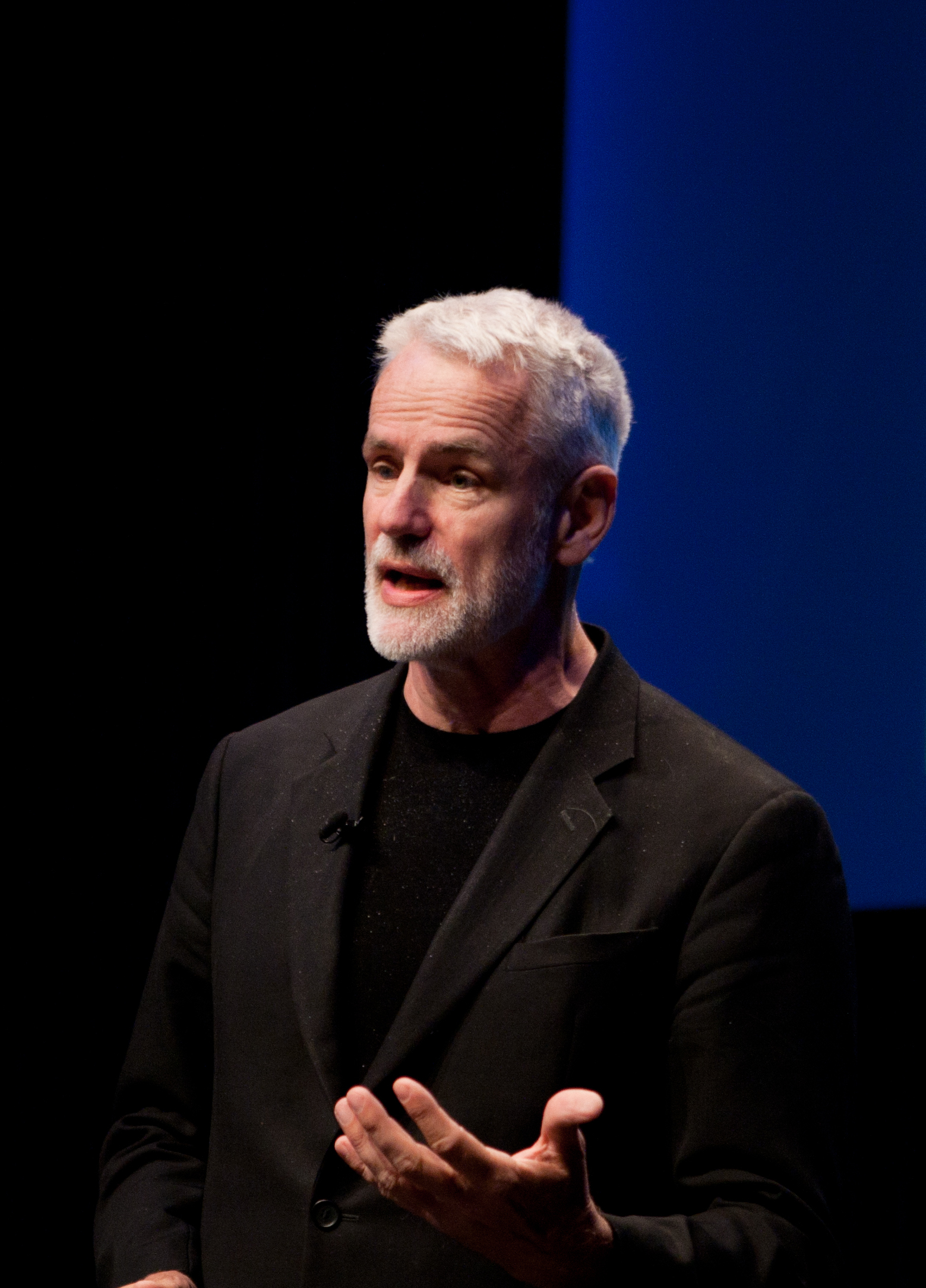
- Born: 6 April 1949 (age 77); Reykjavík, Iceland
- Education: University of Iceland
- Known for: Population genetics
- Spouse: Valgerður Ólafsdóttir (m. 1970; died 2021)
- Children: 4
- Website: www.decode.com

Kári Stefánsson (Note: This is an Icelandic name. The last name is patronymic, not a family name; in Iceland he is referred to by the given name Kári, but internationally he may be referred to as Stefansson.) (born 6 April 1949) is an Icelandic neurologist and founder and CEO of Reykjavík-based biopharmaceutical company deCODE genetics. In Iceland he has pioneered the use of population-scale genetics to understand variation in the sequence of the human genome. His work has focused on how genomic diversity is generated and on the discovery of sequence variants impacting susceptibility to common diseases. This population approach has served as a model for national genome projects around the world and contributed to the realization of several aspects of precision medicine.

== Biography ==
Kari Stefansson was born in 1949 in Reykjavík, Iceland. He was the second youngest of the five children of Sólveig Halldórsdóttir and Stefán Jónsson, a radio personality, writer and democratic socialist member of parliament. He completed his secondary education at Reykjavik Junior College and received his M.D. in 1976 and his Dr. med. in 1986 from the University of Iceland. He was married to Valgerður Ólafsdóttir from 1970 until her death on 11 November 2021. In June 2012, his daughter, Sólveig "Sóla" Káradóttir, married Dhani Harrison, son of the late George Harrison and his wife, Olivia Harrison. Stefansson says that he owes much to his brother, who has schizophrenia. He initially thought of becoming a writer, and attests to being a voracious reader. His favorite author is Isaac Bashevis Singer.

== Academic career ==
Following his internship at the National Hospital of Iceland, he went to the University of Chicago to work under Barry Arnason (coincidentally a Canadian of Icelandic descent). There he completed residencies in neurology and neuropathology, and in 1983 joined the faculty. In 1993 he was appointed professor of neurology, neuropathology and neuroscience at Harvard University and division chief of neuropathology at Boston's Beth Israel Hospital. While in Boston, he and his colleague Jeffrey Gulcher decided to return to Iceland to perform genetic studies to determine multiple sclerosis risk. Stefansson resigned both positions in 1997 after founding deCODE and moving back to Reykjavík. Since 2010, he has held a professorship in medicine at the University of Iceland. He is a board-certified neurologist and neuropathologist in both Iceland and the US.

=== From biology to genetics ===
Stefansson's academic work was focused on neurodegenerative disease. The protein biology approach to this research involved trying to map complex processes using limited samples, mainly of brain tissue from deceased patients. Although publishing steadily, Stefansson was frustrated by the pace of progress and often by not knowing whether the proteins he was characterizing were involved in causing disease or the product of the disease process. He and his colleagues came to question even the accepted definition of multiple sclerosis (MS) as an autoimmune disease.

When he was recruited from Chicago to Harvard, Stefansson began to think that the genome might provide a better starting point than biology. Genes encode proteins, so identifying the genes and specific genetic variations that patients tended to share more often than healthy individuals should provide a foothold in the pathogenesis of disease. In doing so they might point to biologically relevant targets for new drugs and predictive diagnostics.

However, in the mid-1990s the tools for reading the sequence of the genome were primitive. Data was scarce and expensive to generate, and a major early focus of the Human Genome Project was to develop better methods. In the meantime, one solution was to use genetics – how the genome is mixed and passed from one generation to the next – as a means of deriving more information from the available data. Siblings share half their genomes; but cousins one eighth, second cousins one thirty-second, etc. Studying patients linked by extended genealogies should therefore make it possible to more efficiently find the inherited component of any phenotype or trait, even using low-resolution markers.

=== Back to Iceland ===
An important question was whether and where such extended genealogies might be found. It was not one that occurred to many leading geneticists to ask with regard to common diseases. As an Icelander, Stefansson knew the country's passion for genealogy first hand and had grown up with and trained in its national health system. In 1995, he and his colleague and former graduate student, Jeffrey Gulcher, decided to go to Iceland to study multiple sclerosis. Working with doctors in the national health system they identified hundreds of patients and relatives who gave them blood samples to begin their research. As Icelanders they were almost by definition related, and due to the national pastime of genealogy those relationships could be established.

When Stefansson and Gulcher returned to Boston, their grant proposal was turned down by the NIH, which had little experience of funding work using distantly related patients. But Stefansson saw potential in Iceland for using the same approach to find the genetic component of virtually any common disease. This was beyond the scope of an academic laboratory, and he made contact with venture capital firms to find out if such an enterprise could be funded as a private company. In the summer of 1996 he raised $12 million from several American venture capital funds to found deCODE genetics. He and Gulcher moved to Iceland to set up operations and resigned their positions at Harvard the following year.

== deCODE and the population approach ==
Stefansson conceived deCODE as an industrial-scale enterprise for human genetics. Unlike the prevailing academic model of scientists undertaking discrete projects in their separate labs, he proposed to gather and generate as much genealogical, medical and genomic data as he could from across the population. Using bioinformatics and statistics, deCODE could then combine and mine all this data together for correlations between variation in the sequence and any disease or trait, in a nearly hypothesis-free manner. The business model was to fund this effort through partnerships with pharmaceutical companies who would use the discoveries to develop new drugs.

Iceland had the data sources required for this "population approach": a high-quality single-payer healthcare system; a relatively homogeneous population that would make finding disease variants less complex; an educated citizenry that was willing to contribute DNA and medical and health information for research; and most uniquely, comprehensive national genealogies. Mary Clare King, who had used family pedigrees to identify BRCA1 in breast cancer, was among the scientists who recognized the potential of these records. As she told the New Yorker, "to be able to trace the genealogy of an entire nation for a thousand years...and obtain samples of blood and tissue from healthy living people...could become one of the treasures of modern medicine."

From its inception, Stefansson's strategy was controversial. The genomics community was still far from generating a first human genome sequence; he was proposing a data system for mining hundreds of thousands of genomes. Genes linked to rarer syndromes had been identified in isolated families in Sardinia, Newfoundland, Finland and elsewhere, and a BRCA2 variant had been found in Iceland, but he wanted to look at the most common public health problems. The Wall Street Journal called the venture a "big gamble," citing noted scientists that "to date, there's no scientific proof that researchers can decipher the genetics of a complex disease among the population of Iceland – or any country." And deCODE was a private company that was taking an entire nation as a unit of study, with the unprecedented level of public engagement and participation that would entail.

What stirred the most controversy was Stefansson's proposal in 1997 to create a database of copies of medical records data from the national health service to correlate with genealogical and genomic data. Supported by a large majority of the public and members of parliament, the Act on Health Sector Database authorizing the creation of such a database and its licensing for commercial use was passed in 1998. But it was fiercely opposed by a group of local academics and doctors as well as many international bioethicists. Opponents of the Iceland Health Sector Database (IHD) objected to the use of public data by a private enterprise and to presumed consent as the model for the use of medical records in research. They argued that the project put individuals' data privacy at risk, would stifle scientific freedom, and they generally disapproved of the new venture-funded model of biomedical innovation that deCODE represented.

Stefansson was attacked for the IHD and his broader approach. He argued that far from supplanting traditional data sources or researchers, deCODE was creating a new scale of resources and opportunities including for the health service; benefitting the community by repatriating and employing Icelandic scientists in cutting-edge fields; and following international norms of consent while setting new standards in large-scale research, with oversight by public bioethics and data protection bodies and novel data and privacy protection protocols. Critics at the time remained unconvinced. Stanford bioethicist Hank Greely concluded simply that "the Icelandic model is not a good precedent for similar research elsewhere."

== Scientific contributions ==
=== The feasibility of population genetics and national genome projects ===
As the founder of deCODE, Stefansson's helped to demonstrate that genomics could be done at a national scale and provided a blueprint of how to do it. By the time Human Genome Project and Celera published their draft sequences of the human genome in 2001, Stefansson's vision for population genetics had already taken shape and was yielding early discoveries of sequence variation linked to disease, human evolution and population history. In 2002, deCODE used its capabilities in Iceland to publish a genetic map of the genome that was used to complete the final assembly of the reference human genome sequence. By mid-decade, even former critics acknowledged that what Stefansson was building in Iceland was indeed an example of prospective genome projects in the UK, US, Canada, Sweden, Estonia and elsewhere, and to the foundation of new institutions like the Broad Institute.

One pillar of the success of Stefansson's strategy has been his ability to convince tens of thousands of people to volunteer to take part in deCODE's research, and to connect and analyze their data using the genealogies. An early partnership with local software developer Friðrik Skúlason created a computerized national genealogy database that linked all living Icelanders and included the majority of people who have ever lived in Iceland over the past eleven hundred years. In 2003, one version of this database, called Íslendingabók, was made freely available online to anyone with an Icelandic national identity number, and is used by thousands of citizens every day. The version used in research replaces names with encrypted personal identifiers overseen by Iceland's Data Protection Commission. This makes it possible to create pedigrees connecting the genetic and phenotypic data of any group of people in an anonymized manner. Stefansson and Gulcher published the structure of this data protection system for other genome projects to use.

The primary means of recruitment for deCODE research has been through collaboration with physicians across the health service who construct lists of patients with different diseases who are then invited to take part. Participation entails not only written informed consent but also filling out health questionnaires; undergoing detailed clinical examination and measurements; and giving blood for the isolation of DNA; all of this takes place at a special clinic and requires the commitment by participants of several hours to complete. The IHD was never built, its scientific and business rationale largely superseded by the response of Icelanders to contribute their data one by one. By 2003, with some 95% of people asked to participate agreeing to do so, more than 100,000 were taking part in the study of one or more of three-dozen diseases. By 2007, this had grown to 130,000; and by 2018 to more than 160,000. This is roughly 70% of all adult citizens, 60,000 of whom have had their whole genomes sequenced.

At each successive stage of technology for reading the genome – from microsatellite markers to SNPs to whole-genome sequencing – this participation is unique as a proportion of the population and has also consistently comprised one of the largest collections of genomic data in the world in absolute terms. Using the genealogies deCODE can impute the sequence data of the entire population, yielding a single encrypted, minable dataset of more than 300,000 whole genomes.

=== Discoveries and publications ===
Leading his deCODE colleagues to continually build and re-query these population datasets, Stefansson has made a steady stream of contributions to the understanding of how variation in the sequence of the genome is generated and its impact on health and disease. Myles Axton, the longtime editor of Nature Genetics, noted at deCODE's 20th anniversary celebration that this leadership had put deCODE and Iceland "in the forefront of a revolution that has delivered much of what was promised in the mapping of the human genome."

These discoveries, tools and observations have been shared with the scientific community in hundreds of scientific publications. Stefansson guides and oversees all research at deCODE and is senior author on its papers, with project and group leaders the first authors and co-authors drawn from the hundreds of local and international institutions and organizations with whom deCODE has collaborations. A large number of these are contributions to the field and Stefansson and several of his deCODE colleagues are consistently ranked among the most highly cited scientists in genetics and molecular biology.

==== The generation of human diversity and mechanisms of evolution ====
In more than a dozen major papers published over nearly twenty years, Stefansson and his colleagues used their holistic view of an entire population to build a novel picture of the human genome as a system for transmitting information. They have provided a detailed view of how the genome uses recombination, de novo mutation and gene conversion to promote and generate its own diversity but within certain bounds.

In 2002, deCODE published its first recombination map of the human genome. It was constructed with 5000 microsatellite markers and highlighted 104 corrections to the Human Genome Project's draft assembly of the genome, immediately increasing the accuracy of the draft from 93 to 99%. But from an evolutionary biology perspective it demonstrated in new detail the non-random location of recombinations - the reshuffling of the genome that goes into the making of eggs and sperm - and that women recombine 1.6 times more than men.

They then showed that older women recombine more than younger women; that higher recombination correlates with higher fertility; and that a large inversion on chromosome 17 is at present under positive evolutionary selection in European populations, with carriers having higher recombination and fertility rates than non-carriers. A second recombination map published in 2010 utilized 300,000 SNPs and revealed different recombination hotspots between women and men, as well as novel genetic variations that affect recombination rate, and that do so differently in European and African populations.

This map also showed that while women are responsible for most recombination, men generate the bulk of de novo mutations. In a much discussed paper from 2012 they demonstrated that the number of such mutations — variants that appear in the genomes of children but are not inherited from either parent — increases with paternal age and constitute a major source of rare diseases of childhood. A detailed analysis of the different types and distribution of maternal and paternal de novo mutations was published in 2017, and a subsequent paper demonstrated how de novo mutations in parents can be passed on.

A third source of genomic diversity, gene conversions, are difficult to detect except by looking at very large genealogies. deCODE combined genomic and genealogical data on some 150,000 people to demonstrate that this process is, like crossover recombination, more common in women; is age dependent; and that male and female gene conversions tend to be complementary in type, so that they hold each other in check. In 2019, deCODE utilized the genealogies, the large number of whole genome sequences (WGS) that it had completed in the preceding years, and genotyping data on the majority of the population, to publish a third recombination map of the genome. This is the first created using WGS data, and like the previous maps has been made openly available to the global scientific community.

Contributions to population history and genetic anthropology include pioneering work on the mutation rate and mechanisms in mitochondria and the Y chromosome; comparing ancient to contemporary DNA; characterization of the respective Norse and Celtic roots of mitochondria and Y chromosomes in the Icelandic population; observations of the phenomenon of genetic drift, as an isolated population diverges from it source populations over time; the relationship between kinship and fertility; the impact of population structure on disease associated variants and vice versa, and a population-wide catalogue of human knockouts, people missing certain genes.

In 2018, deCODE used its capabilities to reconstruct the genome of Hans Jonatan, one of the first Icelanders of African descent. He immigrated to Iceland in 1802 and his genome was reconstructed from fragments of the genomes of 180 of his nearly 800 living descendants, traceable through Íslendingabok.

==== The genetics of common diseases and traits ====
Stefansson is probably best known for the contribution he and his deCODE colleagues have made to the discovery of genetic variations linked to risk of disease and to a range of other traits. The population approach — the scale and breadth of resources and the focus on cross-mining disparate datasets — has been key to this productivity. It makes it possible to use both broad and rigorous definitions of phenotypes, rapidly test ideas, and for deCODE scientists to follow where the data leads rather than their own hypotheses. This has led to a range of discoveries that link diseases and at times use the genetics even to redefine phenotypes in unusual ways, and Stefansson has spent significant time explaining these discoveries and their utility to the scientific and lay media. Typically, discoveries made in Iceland are published alongside validation in outside populations. Conversely, deCODE has often used its resources to validate discoveries made elsewhere. Among the more noteworthy of these discoveries are, by disease and trait:

===== Alzheimer's disease =====
A variant in the APP gene was discovered in 2012 that protects carriers against Alzheimer's disease (AD) and protects the elderly from cognitive decline. It has been widely cited and used to inform the development of BACE1 inhibitors as potential treatments. Stefansson and the deCODE team have also discovered variants in the TREM2 and ABCA7 genes that increase risk of AD.

===== Schizophrenia, other psychiatric disorders, cognition =====
Stefansson and his team have used the breadth of the company's datasets and links between diseases and traits to discover new risk variants for mental illness, but also to refine the understanding of the perturbations that define these conditions and the nature of cognition itself. Studies in the early 2000s mapped the involvement of the Neuregulin 1 gene in schizophrenia, leading to substantial research in this novel pathway. Over the next fifteen years they used standard GWAS and reduced fecundity as an intermediate phenotype to home in on SNPs and copy number variations (CNVs) linked to risk of schizophrenia and other disorders; they demonstrated that genetic risk factors for schizophrenia and autism confer cognitive abnormalities even in control subjects; they linked schizophrenia, bipolar disorder with both creativity and risk of addiction; they identified genetic variants associated with educational attainment and childhood cognition; and demonstrated that these variants are currently under negative evolutionary selection. In addressing common psychiatric disorders and cognitive processes and traits across a population, this body of work has contributed to the present understanding of these conditions not as discrete phenotypes but as related through the disruption of fundamental cognitive functions.

===== Cancer =====
Stefansson and his colleagues have made numerous pioneering discoveries of genome variants conferring risk of many common cancers. They have played a role in shaping the now commonly accepted new paradigm for understanding cancer: that it should be defined at least as much in molecular terms as in where it occurs in the body. deCODE published holistic evidence of this in a familial aggregation of all cancers diagnosed in anyone in Iceland over fifty years, as well as other aggregation studies. These have demonstrated through basic genetics that while certain site cancers clustered in families, others cluster in a non-site specific way, pointing to common molecular causes. They discovered the chromosome 8q24 locus as harboring risk variants for many types of cancer, and variants in the TERT, TP53 and LG24 genes as risk factors for multiple cancers.

deCODE has discovered a number of sequence variants linked to risk of prostate cancer (as well as a protective variant), breast cancer, melanoma and basal cell carcinoma, thyroid cancer, urinary bladder cancer, ovarian cancer, renal cell cancer, gastric cancer, testicular cancer, lung cancer, and clonal hematopoiesis. Three studies over nearly a decade demonstrated the power of the population datasets in Iceland by showing that both common and rare variants linked to increased nicotine addiction and the number of cigarettes smoked per day were also a risk factor for lung cancer and peripheral artery disease; that is, that a genetic predisposition to smoking was at the same time a risk factor for smoking-related disease.

===== Cardiovascular disease =====
Stefansson and his cardiovascular research team have worked with collaborators around the world to discover common and rare variants associated with risk of atrial fibrillation, coronary artery disease (CAD), stroke, peripheral artery disease, sick sinus syndrome, and aortic and intracranial aneurysm. Among their noteworthy recent discoveries is a rare variant in the ASGR1 gene that confers substantial protection from coronary artery disease, the leading cause of death in the developed world. This finding is being used in drug discovery and development at Amgen. Another very large study, analyzing clinical and whole-genome sequence data from some 300,000 people, found more than a dozen relatively rare variants corresponding to elevated cholesterol levels. However the genetic links to CAD risk provided a new view of how cholesterol is linked to heart disease. They reported that measuring non-HDL cholesterol better captures risk than measuring LDL cholesterol, which is current standard practice.

===== Diabetes and other traits and conditions =====
deCODE discovered the link between type 2 diabetes (T2D) and variants in the TCF7L2 gene, the most important common known genetic risk factor known, and variants in the CDKAL1 and other genes linked to insulin response and both increased and decreasednT2D risk. The deCODE team has made contributions to the understanding of genetic variation influencing a range of other diseases and traits including glaucoma; menarche; essential tremor; tuberculosis susceptibility; height; gene expression; hair, eye and skin pigmentation; aortic valve stenosis; rhinosinusitis; and dozens of others.

In 2014, Stefansson met David Altshuler, then deputy director of the Broad Institute, who stopped at deCODE on his way back from Finland and Sweden. Altshuler had been leading a T2D research effort and had found a rare variant that seemed to protect even those with common lifestyle risk factors from developing the disease. Stefansson looked for an association in deCODE data which confirmed that Icelanders did not have the exact variant found by Altshuler's team but did have another in the same gene that was clearly protective for T2D. The deCODE team then added their variant to the paper that was published in Nature Genetics.

=== Public-private collaboration and the development of precision medicine ===
While deCODE comprises the first and most comprehensive national genome project in the world, it has never been government funded. It has always been a business that relies on the voluntary participation of citizens and national health system doctors as partners in scientific discovery. This relationship between citizens and private enterprise, which seemed logical to Stefansson, counterintuitive to others and is disliked by some, is becoming ever more common. One factor underlying its success and driving participation in Iceland is clearly national pride, turning the country's small size and historical isolation into a unique advantage in an important field. Another is that discoveries are applied to trying to create and sell actual products to improve medicine and health. In a 2017 interview Iceland's former president Vigdis Finnbogadottir captured a common view: "If Icelanders can contribute to the health of the world, I'm more than proud. I'm grateful."

==== Personal genomics and disease risk diagnostics ====
Stefansson has worked to turn his company's discoveries into medically useful and commercially successful products. Some were highly innovative and paved the way for new industries and markets. In the years after Íslendingabok put Icelanders' genealogies online, the Genographic Project and companies like MyHeritage, FamilyTreeDNA and Ancestry launched websites to enable people everywhere to try to use genetics to build out their genealogies. In November 2007, deCODE launched deCODEme, the first personal genomics service, followed the next day by Google-backed 23andMe. deCODEme included polygenic risk scores built principally on its discoveries to gauge individual predisposition to dozens of common diseases, an approach followed by 23andMe and others. deCODE's published risk markers provided the most rigorously validated foundation for all such services.

Stefansson also oversaw deCODE bringing to market clinical tests for polygenic risk of type 2 diabetes, heart attack, prostate cancer, and atrial fibrillation and stroke. Marketing of these products and deCODEme ceased with the company's financial troubles in 2011, but recent high-profile studies from Massachusetts General Hospital have revived interest in the medical value polygenic risk testing. These tests are using more markers and new algorithms to build upon the risk variants and approach pioneered in Iceland for these same diseases.

==== Drug discovery ====
Yet Stefansson's principal goal has always been to use the genome to inform the development of better drugs. Years before precision medicine became a common term, he wanted to provide its foundation : to find and validate drug targets rooted in disease pathways rather than rely on trial and error in medicinal chemistry, and to be able to test and prescribe drugs for patients likely to respond well. This addresses longstanding productivity challenges in drug development and Stefansson has funded the company principally by partnering with pharmaceutical companies. A $200 million gene and target discovery deal with Roche in 1998 was an early sign of the industry's interest in genomics to make better drugs. Other partnerships were formed with Merck, Pfizer, Astra Zeneca and others. In the mid-2000s the company brought several of its own compounds into clinical development but did not have the financial resources to continue their development after its insolvency and restructuring in 2009.

deCODE Genetics has maintained a long-term partnership with Amgen, which acquired the company in 2012 for $415 million. Since the acquisition, deCODE has operated as a wholly owned subsidiary of Amgen while continuing its research activities and contributing to Amgen's drug development programs.The company has continued to publish research related to genetics, drug targets, human diversity, and evolution.

The integration with Amgen coincided with the beginning of large-scale whole-genome sequencing at deCODE and the imputation of that data throughout the company's Iceland dataset. With that data, Stefansson and his colleagues at Amgen believed that genomics could be transformative to drug development in a way that was not possible with only SNP-chip and GWAS data. Importantly, they could identify rare, high-impact mutations affecting common phenotypes — in brief, the most extreme versions of common diseases — yielding drug targets with potentially better validated and more tractable therapeutic potential. This "rare-for-common" approach is now being followed by many drug companies. The identification of ASGR1 was an example of this and was taken into drug discovery to develop novel cholesterol-fighting drugs.

More broadly, Amgen's longtime chief scientific officer Sean Harper said in 2018 that "with the acquisition of deCODE we gained an industrial capability to do population genetics" that could provide human genetic validation for any target or compound. deCODE assessed Amgen's entire clinical pipeline within a month of the acquisition, delivering information that has helped to avoid clinical failures and prioritize and guide trials. Harper claims that this "target-first drug development" model enabled the company to address its own version of the industry's endemic productivity problem. He estimated that "just [by] having strong genetic support for half your pipeline you can improve your rate of return on R&D investments by approximately 50%."

==== Public health: BRCA2 screening ====
In 2018, deCODE launched a website that enables Icelanders to request the analysis of their sequence data to determine whether they carry a SNP in the BRCA2 gene linked to significantly increased risk of breast and prostate cancer in Icelanders. This was the first time that deCODE, which is primarily a research organization, returned information from its research data to participants. Stefansson had tried for many years to convince the Icelandic Ministry of Health that this was a serious public health issue that deCODE's data could address at virtually no cost, and it was but one of the clearest-cut of many such possible precision medicine applications to healthcare in Iceland.

With no response from the health system, Stefansson went ahead and put the matter in the hands of citizens. As of late 2018, some 40,000 people, more than ten percent of the population, had utilized the site to learn their BRCA2 status. Hundreds of people have been able to learn that they are carriers and the National Hospital has built up its counseling and other services to help those decide how they wish to use this information to protect their health. Given the disease and mortality rates from breast and prostate cancer associated with BRCA2, the availability of this information should enable the prevention and early detection of hundreds of cancers and save dozens of lives.

=== The Iceland population approach as a global model ===
Introducing Stefansson for the William Allan Award lecture at the 2017 American Society of Human Genetics annual conference, Mark Daly, then co-director of the Broad Institute, said:

"it is impossible to overlook a pervasive paradigm involving biobanks recruited with full population engagement, historical medical registry data, investments in large-scale genetic data collection and statistical methodology, and collaborative follow-up across academic and industry boundaries. What is often overlooked is that Kári and his colleagues at deCODE provided the template for this discovery engine. Moreover, it is easy to forget that when Kári founded deCODE Genetics 21 years ago, these concepts were considered quite radical and unlikely to succeed. He was both literally and figuratively on a small island of his own. As Peter Donnelly put it, "the number of countries now investing millions in similar resources is an astonishing testament to the perspicacity of his vision."

Following on Iceland's success, countries now pursuing or planning national genome projects of varying scale, scope and rationale include the UK (via the UK Biobank as well as Genomics England and the Scottish Genomes Partnership separately); the US (All of Us as well as the Million Veteran Program), Australia, Canada, Dubai, Estonia, Finland, France, Hong Kong, Japan, Netherlands, Qatar, Saudi Arabia, Singapore, South Korea, Sweden, and Turkey. Projects funded either largely or partially by pharmaceutical companies to inform drug target discovery include FinnGen (partly led by Mark Daly), Regeneron/Geisinger, and Genomics Medicine Ireland.

In April 2019, Stefansson was named first president of the Nordic Society of Human Genetics and Precision Medicine, formed to create a pan-Nordic framework for human genetics research and the application of genomics to healthcare across the region, with the aim of generating and integrating genomic and healthcare data from Iceland, Norway, Sweden, Denmark, Finland and Estonia.

== Awards and honors ==
Stefansson has received high honors in biomedical research and genetics, including the Anders Jahres Award for Medical Research, the William Allan Award, and the Hans Krebs Medal.

His work has been recognized by patient and research organizations such as the American Alzheimer's Society and by major international publications and bodies including Time, Newsweek, Forbes, BusinessWeek and the World Economic Forum.

He has also received Iceland's highest honor, the Order of the Falcon.

In 2019, he was elected a foreign associate of the US National Academy of Sciences, and received the International KFJ Award from Rigshospitalet, one of the oldest and most prestigious medical institutions in Denmark.

== Popular culture ==
Stefansson is the model for professor Lárus Jóhannsson in Dauðans óvissi tími by Þráinn Bertelsson and the principal villain of Óttar M. Norðfjörð's satirical 2007 book Jón Ásgeir & afmælisveislan, in which he creates a female version of Davíð Oddsson from a sample of Davíð's hair. He is the model for Hrólfur Zóphanías Magnússon, director of the company CoDex, in CoDex 1962 by Sjón. In his 2002 novel Jar City, Arnaldur Indriðason mixes critical and humorous references to deCODE and Stefansson by creating a vaguely sinister genetics institute based in Reykjavík headed by a scrupulously polite, petite brunette named Karitas. In the 2006 film version directed by Baltasar Kormákur, Stefansson (who is 6'5" and with gray hair) plays himself, adding a moment of vérité but losing the satirical irony of his namesake. He was also in the documentary Bobby Fischer Against the World where he engaged in controversial debate with late Bobby Fischer.

Contrary to popular belief, Kári Stefánsson was not the model for Odinn in Vargold, a series of graphic novels inspired by Norse mythology. Graphic artist Jón Páll Halldórsson explains that the similarities between his portrayal of the Norse God Odinn and Kári Stefánsson are purely accidental.
