= Detective Erlendur series =

Novel series by Arnaldur Indriðason

The Inspector Erlendur Series is a popular murder mystery series featuring Reykjavík detective Erlendur Sveinsson. Written by Icelandic author Arnaldur Indriðason, the series is published in the U.S. by Minotaur Press and consists of more than a dozen novels. Mýrin (Jar City), the third book in the series, was the first to be translated into English. Mýrin was also adapted as a 2006 film entitled Jar City, starring Ingvar Eggert Sigurðsson as Erlendur.

Note: Reykjavik Nights, while written later, is a prequel to the Inspector Erlendur series (#0).

== Books ==
- Synir duftsins (Sons of Dust), 1997.
- Dauðarósir (Silent Kill), 1998.
- Mýrin (Jar City), 2000.
- Grafarþögn (Silence of the Grave), 2001.
- Röddin (Voices), 2003.
- Kleifarvatn (The Draining Lake), 2004
- Vetrarborgin (Arctic Chill), 2005
- Harðskafi (Hypothermia), 2007
- Myrká (Outrage), 2008
- Svörtuloft (Black Skies), 2013
- Furðustrandir (Strange Shores), 2014
- Einvígið (The Great Match), 2011
- Reykjavíkurnætur, (Reykjavik Nights), 2012
- Kamp Knox (Oblivion), 2014
