= DeCODE genetics =

Icelandic biopharmaceutical company

Coordinates: 64°08′08″N 21°56′45″W

deCODE genetics, Inc.
- Type: Private
- Industry: Genetics
- Founded: 1996
- Headquarters: Reykjavík, Iceland
- Key people: Kári Stefánsson, CEO
- Revenue: USD 106.5 Million (2020)
- Number of employees: 201-500
- Parent: Amgen (2012 - present)
- Website: www.decode.com

deCODE genetics (Icelandic: Íslensk erfðagreining) is a biopharmaceutical company based in Reykjavík, Iceland and founded in 1996 by Kári Stefánsson. Its aim was to use population-level genetics studies to identify variations in the human genome associated with common diseases, and to apply these discoveries to treat and prevent them.

As of 2019, more than two-thirds of Iceland's adult population was participating in the company's research efforts. Today, their "population approach" serves as a model for large-scale precision medicine and national genome projects around the world. deCODE is probably best known for its discoveries in human genetics, published in major scientific journals and widely reported in international media. It has also made pioneering contributions to the broad realization of precision medicine, through public engagement in large-scale scientific research; the development of genetic disease risk testing for individuals and across health systems; and new models of private sector participation and partnership in basic science and public health research.

Since 2012, it has been an independent subsidiary of Amgen. Its capabilities and discoveries have directly contributed to the development of novel drugs. Their example has helped spur investment in genomics and precision therapeutics by other pharmaceutical and biotechnology companies.

== Iceland and the population approach ==
In 1996, Stefansson left a tenured position at Harvard Medical School to found a genomics enterprise in Iceland. Nearly everything in his thinking was unproven or controversial. At the time, the causes of some rare diseases - often variations in single genes that could be found by studying small families - were beginning to be uncovered. Yet it was far from universally accepted that there was any significant genetic component to common/complex diseases like heart disease or type 2 diabetes with well-known behavioral and environmental risk factors; nor, even if there were, whether such variations could be found given the rudimentary technology for reading DNA.

Stefansson was convinced that these existed and could be identified, but only by working at industrial scale. A decade before the term was in common use, deCODE's premise was that this was a big data problem: finding variants impacting risk in dynamic interaction with lifestyle and other factors would require studies not at the family level, but at the scale of public health. As a discovery venture in uncharted territory, the strategy was to assemble and query as much data as possible: DNA contributed by tens of thousands of people; both broad and deep medical and health data; and, crucially, comprehensive genealogies linking all these participants together. In short, this required a population, with people willing to take part in research, a modern healthcare system with meaningful numbers of cases of most common diseases, and much genealogical data. Iceland, Stefansson's native country, with 270,000 people at the time, fit this description better than any other.

In 1996, funded by $12 million in American venture capital, deCODE set up a laboratory and began operations. Within its first few years it recruited and genotyped tens of thousands of participants. It made rapid progress in creating a national genealogy database; developed a novel privacy protection system with government-supervised identity encryption; signed a landmark partnership with Swiss pharmaceutical company Roche; and mapped putative disease genes in a handful of conditions.

At the same time as it was beginning to prove its science, the company ignited a huge controversy with the proposal to create a research database - the Iceland Health Sector Database (or IHD for short) - containing copies of medical records from across the country's national health service. In December 1998, with lobbying from deCODE, the Icelandic Parliament passed the Act on Health Sector Database which permitted public bidding for the right of a company to create this health database and use it for commercial research and to support the national health system. The parliament shortly thereafter granted deCODE the right to create this database after the company made a successful bid to do so. Widely supported by the public and parliament, the IHD's openly commercial aims, and proposed inclusion of medical records data unless individuals opted out, unleashed vehement opposition played out in the local and international media, led by a group of Icelandic activists as well as a number of foreign bioethicists. Although the IHD was never built, the debate underscored the political challenges involved in enlisting an entire society in a scientific enterprise, especially one with the explicit aim of commercializing its discoveries. It also ensured that deCODE and its approach went from being a peripheral curiosity to one of the highest profile enterprises in the global effort to understand the human genome.

== Genome of a nation ==
By the time Bill Clinton and Tony Blair announced the completion of the first rough draft of the human genome sequence in June 2000, deCODE was busily scaling up its gene-hunting in dozens of diseases and publishing its first discoveries. The company used the most scalable DNA-reading technology of the time - microsatellite genotyping - to place and measure highly variable and therefore informative markers at hundreds of points along the genome. Analyzed in tandem with the genealogies, this made it possible to home in on regions of specific chromosomes that people with a given disease tended to have inherited from their common ancestors. Harbored within these regions, the thinking went, were genes or sequence variants associated with disease that could subsequently be found using finer-definition methods and tools.

But the main significance of these early publications was the focus on analytics and the suggestive power of the approach. Much of the field and public attention was focused on the race between the publicly funded Human Genome Project (HGP) and the private company Celera to generate the complete sequence of a single whole genome to use as a reference for future research. This was a technical challenge to generate and assemble raw data. By contrast, deCODE was advancing a strategy for analyzing variation in tens of thousands of genomes through genetics, leveraging the nature of the genome as a means of replicating and transmitting information. The power of the genetics was on full view by 2002, when deCODE published a genetic map of the genome consisting of 5000 microsatellite markers, which the genealogies made it possible to order correctly across all the chromosomes. The map was critical to correcting and completing the public reference genome sequence in 2003, improving the accuracy of the HGP assembly from 93% to 99%.

One key to this approach has been mass participation. From its early days, over 90% of people asked to participate in deCODE's disease research have agreed to do so. Participation is voluntary but not trivial. It requires going to a data collection center to have blood drawn, answer questionnaires, and undergo clinical examinations and tests relevant to a given disease. By 2003, more than 100,000 people had volunteered to take part in one or more of deCODE's three-dozen common diseases research programs. This number rose to 130,000 by 2007, and more than 160,000 by 2018. This represents two-thirds of all adult citizens. The genomes of some 60,000 of these participants had been directly sequenced by 2019, with thousands more being sequenced every month.

A second and unique pillar of deCODE's work is the genealogies. Geneticist Mary Claire King, whose family-based research in the early 1990s led to the discovery of the BRCA1 and BRCA2 breast cancer genes, predicted not long after deCODE's founding that the ability "to trace the genealogy of an entire nation...could become one of the treasures of modern medicine." In 1997, deCODE formed a partnership with local software firm Fridrik Skulason ehf to accelerate the creation of a comprehensive, computerized national genealogy database. It drew on all available sources, from the earliest calfskin records and sagas through the 1703 census and parish records to the contemporary national registry.

By the early 2000s they had created what is still today the most comprehensive genealogy of an entire country. It links together all living citizens through virtually complete records back to 1703 (itself recognized by UNESCO as the world's first nominal national census) and stretches back to before the settlement of the country in the ninth century. In the research version of the database, the identities of individuals are encrypted via the same anonymization system used for DNA and medical data, so that the data can be correlated. And In 2003, deCODE launched a public-facing, online version of the database, called Íslendingabók, or the Book of Icelanders. Anyone with an Icelandic social security number could request a password and then research their family tree and see their nearest family connection to anyone else in the country. Within its first month online, more than one-third of the population had requested a password. By 2020, it had over 200,000 registered users and more than 900,000 linked entries, comprising the majority of Icelanders who have ever lived. On an average day, nearly 6000 people, or close to two percent of all citizens, consult the database.

At each successive advance in technology for reading DNA the genealogies have amplified both the amount of data that can be generated from them as well as the power to extract information from the data. In the era of microsatellites, it was possible to establish that participants shared certain markers and segments of the genome not by chance but by descent. With the advent in the mid-2000s of genotyping chips, which could measure hundreds of thousands of single-letter variations (SNPs) across the genome, deCODE statisticians were able to accurately phase segments of the genome - to understand the parental source of segments - and then impute genotypes measured in some people across the entire population.

This effectively multiplies the size and power of any study. When Illumina began selling machines that could economically sequence whole genomes, deCODE was able to directly sequence several thousand Icelanders and then impute whole genome sequence (WGS) data for virtually the entire population. This represents one of the largest single collections of WGS data in the world, and the first results of its analysis were published in 2015 in a special edition of Nature Genetics. The direct sequencing of tens of thousands of more people since then has enabled routine searches for ever rarer variants at an unprecedented scale.

== Discoveries and scientific contributions ==
Genome research in general, and deCODE's global reputation as a discovery organization, took off with the arrival of SNP genotyping chips in the mid-2000s. These tools set off a worldwide boom in genome-wide association studies (GWAS), in which the entire genome is scanned to identify SNPs that those with a given disease tend to have one version of, while unaffected individuals tend to have another. In common diseases, as with many traits or phenotypes such as drug response, the difference is not one of causal certainty but of statistical odds representing increased or decreased risk versus the population average. The ability to conduct large studies and analyze the resulting data - from thousands of patients with a disease and many times more control subjects, ideally unaffected relatives - is therefore at a premium.

deCODE's vast collection of DNA, medical and genealogical data that could be mined together - and enriched through repeated querying and imputation - was almost perfectly suited to this type of study. Since 2003, the company has discovered and published hundreds of variants linked to susceptibility to scores of diseases and conditions, including major ongoing contributions to understanding inherited risk for Alzheimer's disease, schizophrenia and other psychiatric disorders; a dozen common forms of cancer; coronary artery disease, stroke atrial fibrillation and the other most common cardiovascular diseases; as well as traits and phenotypes ranging from drug response to cognition and hair and eye color. The company publishes its discoveries in peer-reviewed journals, and many, such as the TCF7L2 variants in type 2 diabetes, are used as standard risk markers in polygenic risk modeling and in research.

A review of the GWAS era published in Nature Communications in 2019 quantified deCODE's outsized contribution to the field: Icelanders accounted for 12% of all participants in all published GWAS studies globally between 2007 and 2017, with each citizen participating on average to 19 published findings in that period alone. Stefansson, deCODE's research chief Unnur Thorsteinsdottir, and statistician Gudmar Thorleifsson were respectively ranked the first-, second- and sixth-highest impact GWAS authors in the world.

Adding whole-genome sequencing (WGS) on top of its genotyping data gave a new dimension and power to deCODE's discovery capabilities. By definition, the common SNPs on standard genotyping chips yielded reliable risk markers but not a determinant foothold in the biology of complex diseases. Yet by running the company's growing number of directly sequenced whole genomes through the genotyping data and genealogies as a scaffold, the company's statisticians have been able to impute very high definition WGS on the entire population. The result has been the ability to conduct GWAS studies using from 20 to 50 million variants, and to systematically search for rare variants that either cause or confer very high risk of extreme versions of common phenotypes, and thereby pointing directly to putative drug targets.

The value of this approach is best known from the model of PCSK9, in which the study of families with extremely high cholesterol levels and early-onset heart disease led to an understanding of the key role of this gene and the development of a new class of cholesterol-fighting drugs. deCODE now routinely searches for such rare variants across many phenotypes and the results have provided the basis of drug discovery and development programs. For example, since 2016 its important contributions in cardiovascular disease include demonstrating that it is non-HDL cholesterol rather than merely LDL levels that most accurately reflect risk of heart disease; finding variants in the ASGR1 gene that protect against coronary artery disease; and defining the role of lipoprotein (a) as a major risk factor for heart attack.

As all deCODE's data sits on its servers and can be queried simultaneously, it can also be queried with remarkable speed. In 2014, a group from the Broad Institute stopped by at deCODE on its way back from Finland, where through a major research effort they had found a variant that protected carriers against type 2 diabetes. Over coffee, the deCODE team confirmed that the Finnish variant did not exist in Iceland, but that another did. The Broad group added it to the paper announcing the discovery.

Because of its singular population resources and the questions its scientists can ask and answer, many of deCODE's most remarkable findings have been in basic science. One notable focus has been on elucidating how variation in the sequence of the genome is generated. Following its microsatellite-based genetic map of the genome in 2002, the company created and made available to the scientific community two more: one in 2010 built on 300,000 SNPs, and another in 2019 built on WGS data. Recombination - the reshuffling of chromosomes that takes place in the making of eggs and sperm - is a primary mechanism for generating diversity and to build these maps. Over fifteen years deCODE has published a series of breakthrough papers detailing in a real human population how recombination rate varies according to sex, age and other characteristics, and how these differences impact the generation of genomic diversity and variation of many kinds. The general picture that has emerged is that the genome is generating diversity but within certain bounds, providing a dynamic but generally stable substrate for natural selection and evolution.

To understand the population that it is working in and to address broader questions few can in the same way, deCODE has also from its early days had its own genetic anthropology group. It has published pioneering work on mitochondrial and Y-chromosome mutation to trace the Norwegian and Celtic mix in the early population; sequenced ancient DNA from the settlement period; compared ancient and modern Icelandic genomes to see how genetic drift, epidemics and natural disasters have yielded a modern-day population genetically distinct from its forebears and source populations. and observed variants under positive natural selection in a present-day society. The company has also catalogued human knockouts - people missing certain genes - and reconstructed the genome of the first man of African descent to live in Iceland by analyzing the sequences of hundreds of his living descendants. These studies are avidly followed by foreign and Icelandic media alike, and constitute another type of return that deCODE renders to the society it studies and works within.

== Product innovation ==
deCODE's scientific leadership over more than twenty years has enabled it repeatedly to pioneer new types of partnerships, products and applications for many aspects of precision medicine. Between 1998 and 2004, the company signed high-profile and innovative partnerships with pharmaceutical companies Roche, Merck, Bayer, Wyeth and others. These alliances provided research funding to advance deCODE's work, with goals of finding genetically validated new drug targets in common diseases; to develop DNA-based diagnostics, that could gauge risk of disease or predict drug response and identify patients most likely to benefit from a drug; and to design "information-rich" clinical trials that would enroll participants with particular genetic variants, with the potential to make trials smaller, more informative, and with a greater chance of success.

In 2002, deCODE acquired a Chicago-based medicinal chemistry company in order to discover compounds based on its genetics discoveries and so to begin to develop its own pipeline of new drugs. Over the next few years the company initiated and completed several early-stage clinical trials for potential new treatments for heart attack, peripheral artery disease, and conducted work with partners on asthma and SMA. These were early examples of what would today be called 'precision medicine' programs: using genetics for target discovery and to select trial participants by testing them for disease susceptibility through the same pathway targeted by the drug.

In the mid-2000s, deCODE launched a new kind of risk diagnostic focused largely on prevention and wellness. These DNA-based diagnostic tests detected genetic variants identified by deCODE and others that correlated with significantly increased individual risk of common diseases including heart attack, atrial fibrillation and stroke, type 2 diabetes, common (non-BRCA) breast cancer, prostate cancer and glaucoma. The type 2 diabetes test, for example, was based on published studies that showed that approximately 10% of people carried two copies of deCODE's highest impact risk variant, putting them at twice the average risk of developing diabetes, independent of obesity. The medical purpose of the test was "to identify prediabetics at higher than average risk of progressing to full-blown diabetes, and that these same individuals can effectively counteract this added risk through weight loss and through the use of certain medications."

Another novel characteristic of these tests was the integration of multiple, well-validated genetic risk factors. The overall impact of these different risk factors was combined and calculated into what was called a polygenic risk score, placing the individual on a spectrum of risk with regard to that of the population in general, independent of and in addition to other health or lifestyle risk factors. With each new discovery, deCODE could broaden the risk factors tested. The idea was to make screening and prevention strategies and therapies more specific and more effective for those at higher risk, and hopefully to provide new incentive for individuals to follow through with well understood lifestyle modification such as weight loss, smoking cessation, etc. This was the essence of what was then called personalized medicine, but because these tests were new, their medical usefulness was as yet unproven. As everyone is by definition at risk of common diseases, and doctors generally understood genetic risk only as it referred to rare diseases, the medical community approached these tests with skepticism. In 2018, advocacy for the use of polygenic risk scores for identifying those at significantly increased risk of common diseases, and using whole-genome data and new algorithms to build on many early deCODE markers, began a revival.

To judge by the intense media coverage of deCODE's discoveries, ordinary people were very certainly interested in these genetic risk factors and how they might be relevant to their health. In late 2007, the company effectively launched the field of personal genomics with its deCODEme direct-to-consumer (DTC) scan aimed at enabling people to better understand their risk of common diseases and use this information to stay healthy. deCODEme hit the market a day before the now widely known, Google-funded 23andMe. deCODEme's marketing emphasized its pedigree, seriousness and scientific rigor: "provided by a world leader in the discovery of genetic risk factors for disease...[so that its customers] benefit directly from the knowledge and experience of scientists carrying out internationally renowned research" (its competitors used deCODE's published variants as the basis for many of their results); with the scan processed in the same labs that had found them. By 2012, the deCODEme complete scan measured one million SNPs and calculated risk for 47 common diseases and traits as well as basic information on maternal and paternal ancestry, noting that most ancestry scans of the period were not back by much data.

Despite deCODEme's emphasis that its results were for informational purposes — "a roadmap to improve your health" — and the provision of genetic counseling for users who had questions about their results, US regulators quickly took a critical view of disease risk assessments being put directly in the hands of consumers. In June 2010, the FDA wrote to deCODE and its main competitors to say that they considered such scans to be medical devices requiring FDA approval. Facing regulatory headwinds and then corporate reorganization, deCODE stopped selling deCODEme in late 2012. In 2017, the FDA began to approve certain assessments of genetic risk for disease in consumer tests.

In 2018, deCODE broke new ground with a direct intervention in public health and the first national genetic screening program of its kind. The company launched a website that enables anyone in Iceland to ask the company - free of charge - to search their whole genome sequence data to determine whether they are likely carriers of a SNP in the BRCA2 gene that confers high risk of breast and prostate cancer in Iceland. Within months, ten percent of the population had requested their BRCA2 status, and the National Hospital has built up its counseling and other services to help people follow up on their preliminary results and use the information to protect their health.

== Business ==
Despite its pathbreaking science, or perhaps because it was often far ahead of the field, deCODE had a volatile history as a standalone business. In July 2000, it completed a $200 million IPO on Nasdaq, which was big for the time and the first listing by an Icelandic company on a US exchange. Its early pharmaceutical alliances, particularly that with Roche, further helped to fund the enrollment of most of the adults in the country in the first decade of its research, as well as the rapid expansion of both its discovery capabilities and its product development efforts in drugs, diagnostics, and personal genomics.

From a scientific perspective, as the Broad Institute's David Altschuler told the MIT Tech Review in 2004, "This is a business in which critical mass is important, and they have achieved critical mass." But the business was also about money. Being an innovation enterprise pioneering new markets, the company had spent more than $500 million on R&D in its first decade and never been profitable. By 2006 it was borrowing more, to fund drug development programs based on completely novel premises; to bring forward diagnostic tests in a market that even supporters termed "still embryonic"; and to market personal genomics, where it was being overshadowed by the Silicon Valley glamour and cash of 23andMe.

By late 2008, the company was "between a rock and a hard place," in Stefansson's own words. Under threat of being delisted from Nasdaq for its flagging stock price, the company needed more capital just as the global markets were going into crisis. Although its scientists kept publishing breakthroughs at a remarkable rate, in late 2009, the company's listed US holding company, deCODE genetics, Inc., declared Chapter 11 bankruptcy. Its key assets - the heart of which was the Iceland genetics operation - were bought and kept running by a consortium of the company's two main original venture backers: ARCH Venture Partners and Polaris Ventures, along with Illumina, Inc., the dominant maker of genotyping chips and sequencing equipment. It abandoned work on its drug development programs.

As a business, deCODE had in some sense gone back to the future: it was a 13-year-old company with a global reputation, again backed by its original VCs, which Newsweek called "the world's most successful failure." During the following period Stefansson mused publicly that deCODE had been founded between six and ten years too early. The technology for accurately reading DNA with sufficient detail, he reasoned, had not arrived until the mid-2000s, leaving deCODE in debt for years of R&D but based on findings that didn't provide a detailed enough insight into the biology of disease to swiftly create commercially compelling diagnostics and developmental drugs. What might provide that insight was population-scale WGS data. By 2010 Stefansson was outlining how to sequence a few thousand individuals and then use imputation - powered again by the genealogies - to ensure that deCODE would be the first in the world to have anything like it.

In spite of its straitened circumstances, with Illumina as one of its owners the company could still receive the latest sequencing machines and reagents. In 2011, deCODE and Illumina collaborated on a paper that gave an early hint at the power of WGS imputation, turning 500 sequences into 40,000 whole genomes of data. This was enough to begin to discover rare variants, validated through replication in several other populations. Unlike common variants, mutations causing rare diseases tend to be in the regions of genes that encode proteins, providing both a direct window on disease biology and so more direct utility as drug targets. In December 2012, the American pharmaceutical company Amgen acquired deCODE for $415 million.

A key rationale for the acquisition was deCODE's unique ability to use WGS data to discover rare coding variants and cause extreme versions of more common diseases. As Sean Harper, then Amgen's head of R&D told Forbes, "It was really working on targets like PCSK9 [for heart disease]...that really drove home the immense value of having targets that have either been discovered or validated by the kind of human genetic analysis that Decode is a world expert in." More broadly, these capabilities could be applied to evaluate current programs as well, and within month of the acquisition deCODE had reviewed Amgen's entire pipeline. In 2018, Harper estimated that "just [by] having strong genetic support for half your pipeline you can improve your rate of return on R&D investments by approximately 50%." By 2020, Amgen had brought two new cardiovascular drugs into clinical trials based directly on deCODE discoveries, which continue to be published in leading scientific journals.

== As global model ==
Introducing Stefansson for the organizations at the American Society of Human Genetics annual meeting in 2017, the Broad Institute's Mark Daly observed that the meeting and the field were dominated by "a pervasive paradigm involving biobanks recruited with full population engagement, historical medical registry data, investments in large-scale genetic data collection and statistical methodology, and collaborative follow-up across academic and industry boundaries...[and] deCODE provided the template for this discovery engine."

From its early days, deCODE's example gave fresh impetus to others hunting for disease genes in isolated communities and small populations in Sardinia, Quebec, Newfoundland, northern Sweden, Finland, and elsewhere. However deCODE was not touting the Icelandic population's "relative homogeneity" in order to find variants causing rare syndromes, but because the existence of founder mutations would help to power discovery of variants impacting common disease. In terms of its relevance to global medical challenges, Iceland was not an inbred population with a high prevalence of rare syndromes but rather a European society in miniature that could be studied as a whole: not the biggest small population so much as the smallest big one.

The first large country to follow deCODE's example was the UK. Iceland's experience, behind the scientific and medical value of applying the NHS's vast reach and resources to one of the most diverse populations in the world, informed the authorization of the UK Biobank in 2003 and then Genomics England in 2013. Other early, large-scale biobank and genomics efforts linked to major health systems included the Million Veterans Program in the US, launched in 2009; the Research Program on Genes, Environment and Health at California's Kaiser Permanente, begun in 2007; and the China Kadoorie Biobank in mainland China and Hong Kong begun in the mid-2000s.

After 2014, when Illumina announced that its new X-Ten system could sequence whole genomes at scale for $1000 each, national genome projects proliferated, from the US (All of Us, alongside the MVP) and (alongside CKB) to Australia, Canada, Dubai, Estonia (originally begun in 2000), France, Hong Kong, Japan, Netherlands, Qatar, Saudi Arabia, Singapore, South Korea, Sweden, and Turkey, and beyond. Although with varying focuses and approaches, all of these programs were at the least implicitly inspired by deCODE's example.

Other large projects led by pharmaceutical companies have closely followed deCODE's model and its work with Amgen. These include Regeneron's with the Geisinger health system in the US, and Astra Zeneca's hybrid public/private/academic partnership with the Wellcome Trust in the UK, Craig Venter's Human Longevity in California, and Finngen in Helsinki. The latter, founded by Broad Institute leaders and Finnish universities, the health ministry, and biobanks to drive drug discovery, is remarkably close to deCODE's original vision in Iceland but with academics and government bodies as equity partners in the business. This public-private partnership model may explain the passage of legislation in Finland in 2019 authorizing the near wholesale use of anonymized medical records, social welfare data and biobank samples for biomedical research, which goes well beyond the ambitions of the 1998 IHD legislation that caused so much controversy in Iceland twenty years earlier.

deCODE's direct involvement and lineage is also evident across the field. deCODE is a founding member and leader of the Nordic Society of Human Genetics and Precision Medicine, which brings together the resources of all the Scandinavian countries and Iceland and Estonia to advance gene discovery and the application of precision medicine across the region. In 2013, a group of deCODE alumni created a spinoff, NextCODE Health (now Genuity Science), that licensed and further developed informatics and sequence data management tools originally developed in Iceland to support clinical diagnostics and population genomics in other countries. Its systems and tools have been used by national genome projects in England, Qatar, Singapore; pediatric rare disease programs in the UK, US and China; and at its subsidiary Genomics Medicine Ireland. In 2019, deCODE and US regional health system Intermountain partnered to conduct a 500,000-person WGS-based research and precision medicine study, and deCODE also began sequencing 225,000 participants in the UK Biobank.

== Response to COVID-19 pandemic ==
In March 2020, as the SARS-CoV-2 virus began to spread widely in Iceland, deCODE temporarily redirected its clinical research, laboratory staff and operations to conduct large-scale testing for COVID-19. This effort marked the company's deepest and most direct ever involvement in public health and constitutes an important component of one of the most intensive containment strategies of any country in the early months of the global pandemic.

The response of Iceland's health authorities to the pandemic was notable for being an early, transparent and effective example of best-practice 'test, trace and isolate' epidemiological control. In late January 2020, the National Directorate of Health began testing people arriving in Iceland from high-risk areas or showing possible symptoms of infection, and, with the Department of Civil Protection and Emergency Management, activated a system to isolate anyone diagnosed with the virus and to trace and quarantine all of their contacts. Iceland's first case was diagnosed on 28 February, a month after targeted testing began, and within days dozens of people were testing positive every day. Little more than two months later, Iceland was virtually free of active infections.

The foundation of this response and the data to guide it was testing. Yet while the official testing effort was prompt and energetic, it was focused on those who were either symptomatic or at high risk due to having likely been in contact with infected people. In early March, deCODE's CEO Kari Stefansson became concerned that without also screening the population at large there was no way to understand the virus' spread or its fatality rate, crucial information for holistically addressing the epidemic. In this "all-hands-on-deck" moment, and with the know-how, people and equipment to rapidly turn the company's genetics research lab into a PCR diagnostic testing facility, he offered to put the company's capabilities to work to screen the general population under the auspices of the Directorate of Health. deCODE staff worked swiftly to put together workflows for everything from sample collection to running the tests to privacy-protected reporting, and to get the swabs and reagents ready to begin large-scale testing. On Thursday 12 March 2020, the company opened its website to book appointments for testing and within hours 12,000 people had signed up. Testing began the following morning, free of charge.

The deCODE effort scaled up quickly to a capacity of over 1000 samples per day. From the beginning of population screening, fewer than 1% of those taking part were found to be infected, indicating that the health authorities' containment strategy was working. From mid-March to the end of May 2020, the company conducted an average of 600 tests a day, complementing the health authorities' 250 tests per day at the National-University Hospital. Those testing positive in deCODE's screening were similarly isolated and their contacts traced and asked to quarantine themselves. In total, by the beginning of June more than 60,000 tests had been conducted in Iceland, equivalent to 18 percent of the population. Powered by this combined testing strategy and tracing and isolation follow up, the number of infections in Iceland peaked in the first week of April and dropped steeply off by the end of the month. By mid-May, there were only a handful of active infections in the country, although deCODE and the health authorities continued to conduct as many as 200 tests per day thereafter to try to detect any fresh outbreaks.

In tandem with its screening work, deCODE used its genetics capabilities to sequence the virus from hundreds of infected individuals, and to draw a kind of genealogy of the different clades of the virus in the country. This showed how during the early weeks of the pandemic the virus had entered the country with people infected in different countries and then spread within Iceland. In April 2020, with colleagues from the Directorate of Health and the national hospital, the company published in the New England Journal of Medicine a paper detailing what the spread of COVID-19 looks like across a population, and how a robust policy of testing, tracing and isolation could effectively contain it. In May, the company began work to develop and carry out antibody testing in the population, and early results showed that around one percent of the general population that had not been diagnosed with infection carried antibodies for the virus. This meant on the one hand that the virus had been swiftly and well contained, but also that nearly three times had been infected as had been officially diagnosed since the end of February and also that the population was still more than 98% naive. That indicated that large-scale testing would need to continue to detect later outbreaks as the country reopened its borders to travel by its own citizens and others coming to Iceland. In June, the company said that it was working with Amgen's unit in British Columbia to use white blood cells from recovered Icelandic COVID patients to begin to manufacture antibodies for the virus, which could be used either prophylactically or therapeutically.

== Appearances in popular culture ==
The work of deCODE is criticised by Arnaldur Indriðason's novel Jar City from 2000, which was adapted into a 2006 film of the same name.

deCODE and Kári Stefánsson are satirised as VikingDNA and Professor Lárus Jóhannsson in Dauðans óvissi tími by Þráinn Bertelsson (Reykjavík: JPV Útgáfu, 2004).

deCODE and specifically Kári Stefánsson is presented as the creator of monstrous genetic hybrids in Óttar M. Norðfjörð's satirical 2007 work Jón Ásgeir & afmælisveislan (Reykjavík: Sögur, 2007), and the history of DeCODE appears both directly and in allegorised form (under the fictional name OriGenes) in the same author's novel Lygarinn: Sönn saga (Reykjavík: Sögur, 2011). deCODE is the model for the company CoDex, in CoDex 1962 by Sjón.
