= Kleifarvatn =

Lake on the Reykjanes Peninsula in Iceland

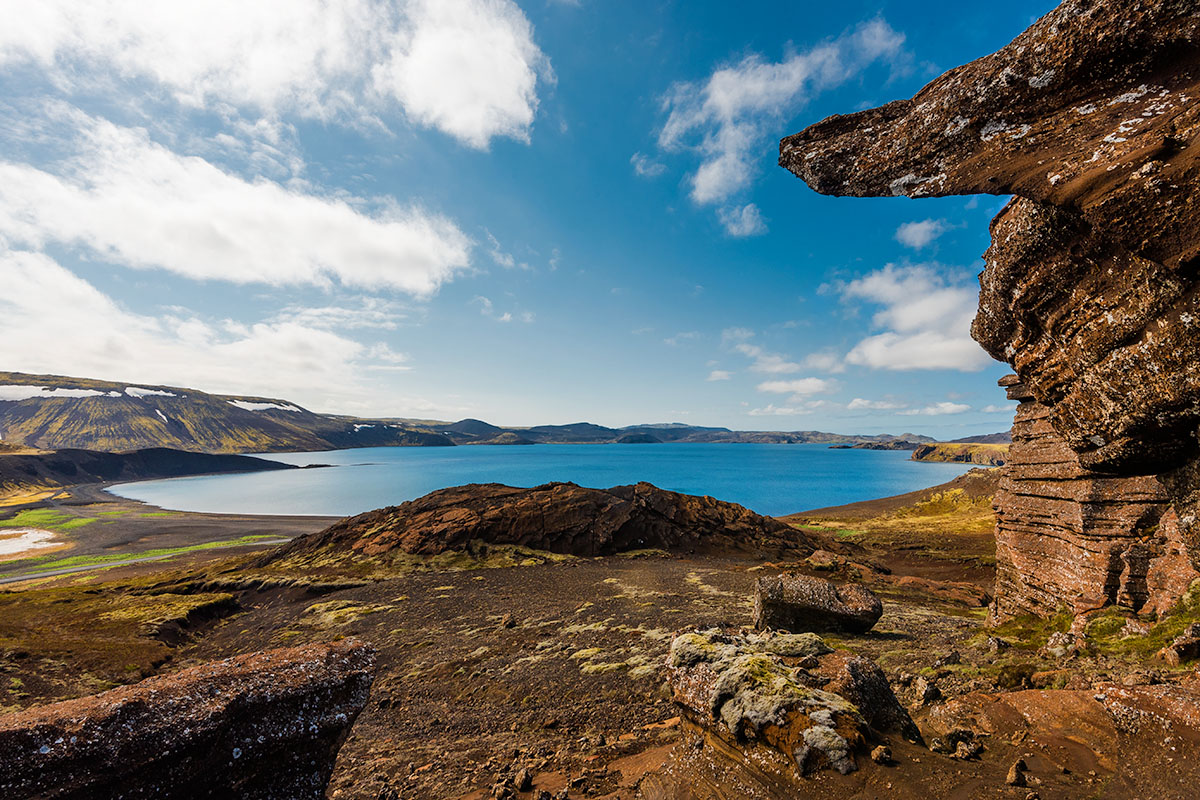
- Lake Kleifarvatn in Iceland

- Location within Iceland
- Location: Reykjanes
- Coordinates: 63°55′30″N 21°58′48″W
- Basin countries: Iceland
- Max. length: 4.7 km (2.9 mi) (as of 2000)
- Max. width: 2.5 km (1.6 mi) (as of 2000)
- Surface area: 7.3615 km^{2} (2.8423 sq mi)
- Average depth: 29 m (95 ft) (mean as of 2000)
- Max. depth: 89.5 m (294 ft)
- Water volume: 0.256 km^{3} (0.061 cu mi)
- Surface elevation: 135 m (443 ft)

Kleifarvatn (Icelandic pronunciation: [ˈkʰleiːvarˌvahtn̥]) is the largest lake on the Reykjanes Peninsula in Iceland, situated in the southern part of the peninsula. It is located on the fissure zone of the Mid-Atlantic Ridge. The lake has no visible water coming in or going out as most of its water comes and leaves underground. The lake can be reached via a track, and there are two areas with high temperature that can be found not far from it: Seltún/Krýsuvík and another to the east. A 2012 survey demonstrated one definite geothermal vent under the lake and suggested two others in a linear line trending as for most of the faults in the area.

Kleifarvatn was first surveyed in 1964 and studied at greater resolution later. The lake's greatest recorded depth was 97 m (318 ft) in 1975 with height above sea level of 140 m (460 ft). After the 2000 Iceland earthquakes, the lake began to diminish, so that at least 20% of its surface has since disappeared and the serial surveys suggest there has been some material deposition as depth has reduced more than height above sea level of the lake surface. By 2012 the surface was at 135 m (443 ft) with a maximum depth of 89.5 m (294 ft). The lake by then was only 7.3615 km^{2} (2.8423 sq mi) in area. Its area previously been measured between 7.5 and 10 km^{2} (2.9 and 3.9 sq mi). The pattern of sedimentation suggests that at some time in the past the lake was smaller in size than it was in 2012.

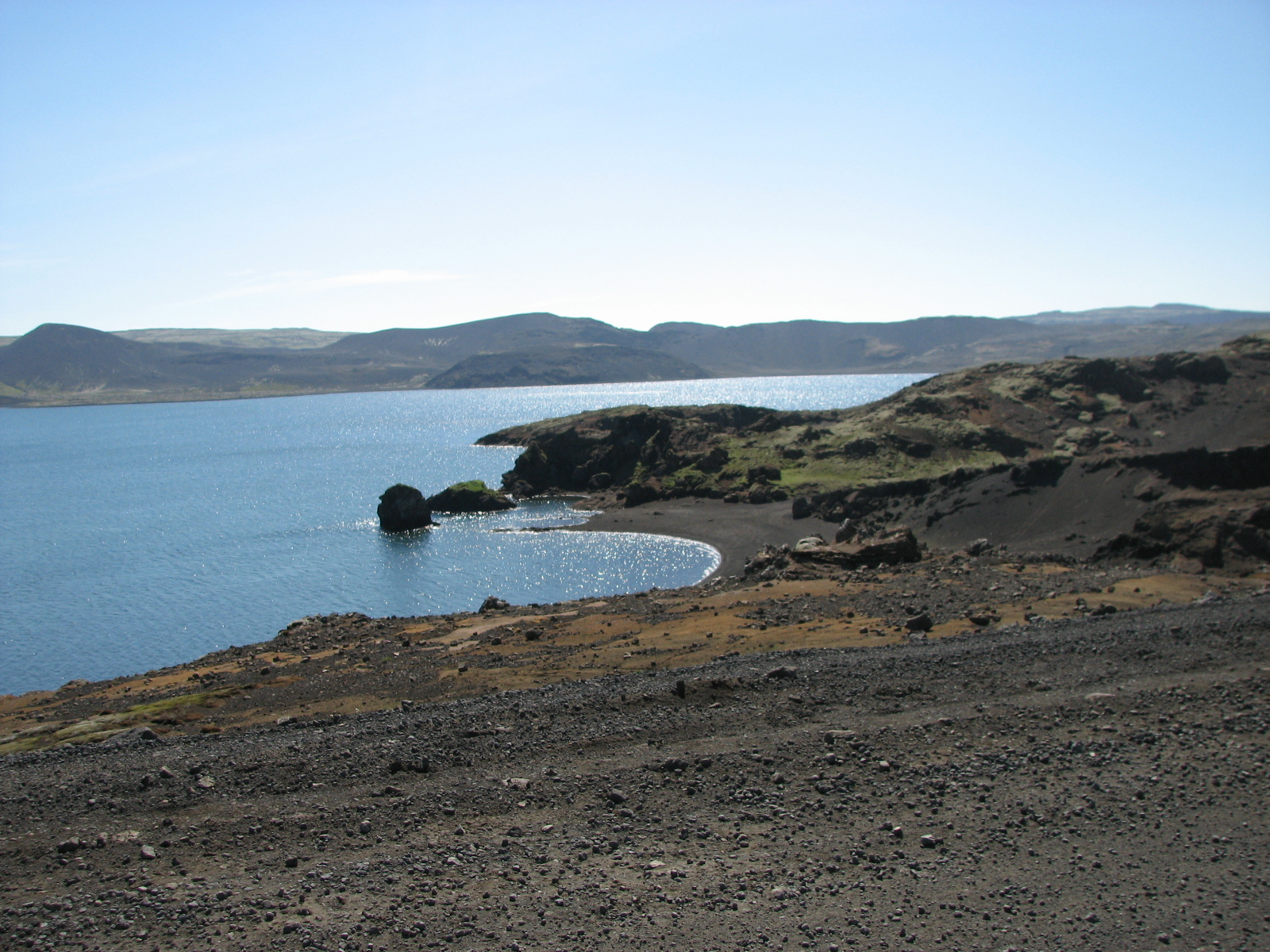
Kleifarvatn, June 2008

The novel Kleifarvatn by Icelandic writer Arnaldur Indriðason was named after the lake.

== See also ==
- List of lakes of Iceland
- Volcanism of Iceland
