= Ingólfsson =

Ingólfsson is a patronymic. Notable people with the patronymic include:

- Darri Ingolfsson (born 1979), Icelandic actor
- Gwen Ingolfsson, main character in the novel Drakon by S. M. Stirling
- Haraldur Ingólfsson (born 1970), Icelandic former footballer
- Judith Ingolfsson (born 1973), violinist
- Viktor Arnar Ingólfsson (born 1955), Icelandic writer of crime fiction

== See also ==
- Ingela Olsson
- Wingolf
