= Jar City =

Crime novel by Arnaldur Indriðason

Jar City (Tainted Blood)
- First edition (Icelandic)
- Author: Arnaldur Indriðason
- Original title: Mýrin
- Translator: Bernard Scudder
- Language: Icelandic
- Series: Detective Erlendur, #3
- Genre: Crime, Mystery novel
- Publisher: Harvill Press (UK); Thomas Dunne Books (US); Vintage Books (UK)
- Publication date: 2000 (Iceland)
- Publication place: Iceland
- English publication date: 2004 (UK); 2005 (US)
- Media type: Print (Hardback & Paperback)
- Pages: 224 pp (Eng. trans.)
- ISBN: 1-84343-101-7 (UK); ISBN 0-312-34070-2 (US); ISBN 0-09-946163-3 (Tainted Blood, UK)
- OCLC: 57527467
- Preceded by: Silent Kill
- Followed by: Silence of the Grave

Jar City, also known as Tainted Blood (Icelandic: Mýrin, "The Bog"), is a crime novel by Icelandic author Arnaldur Indriðason, first published in Iceland in 2000. It was the first in the Detective Erlendur series to be translated into English (in 2004). In the UK, the title was changed to Tainted Blood when the paperback edition was released.

The novel is at one level a fierce critique of the gene-gathering work of deCODE genetics:

far from reinforcing the kind of myths of Icelandic national identity promoted by eugenicists earlier in the twentieth century and re-invoked by the publicity machine around DeCODE, Indriđason’s novel uses the figure of the defective gene not only to expose and trouble national mythologies of social and familial cohesion and continuity but to ask some fundamental questions about the meaning of innocence and guilt, justice and punishment in the face of the identification of genes that bear the secret not of life but of death.

== Plot ==
The body of a 70-year-old man who was struck on the head with a glass ashtray is found in a flat in Norðurmýri. The only clues are a photograph of a young girl's grave and a cryptic note left on the body. Detective Erlendur discovers that the victim was accused of a violent rape some forty years earlier but was never convicted.

== Awards ==
The novel won the Scandinavian crime writers' Glass Key award in 2002 for best Nordic crime fiction novel. In 2003, Arnaldur Indriðason's following novel, Silence of the Grave, also won the award, making him the first author to have won the award two years in a row.

== Adaptation ==
The novel was adapted into the 2006 film Jar City. It was directed by Baltasar Kormákur and premiered in Iceland on 20 October 2006 and in the UK on 12 September 2008.
