= Lygarinn: Sönn saga =

2011 novel by Óttar M. Norðfjörð

First edition (publ. Sögur)

Lygarinn: Sönn saga ('The liar: a true story') is the seventh novel published by Óttar M. Norðfjörð. It was nominated for the Blóðdropinn award for Icelandic crime fiction in 2012.

== Form ==
Lygarinn is a prose crime thriller divided into five books; each chapter represents a different day of the narrative. Books 1, 3, and 5 recount events taking place mostly in Reykjavík from 22 March to 6 April 2011 and are a third-person account of the activities of the main character, Vera Ragnarsdóttir. Books 2 and 4 comprise a story within a story, being events running from 11 to 17 July 1972; these books are notionally excerpts from the diary of Vera's father Ragnar Hóseasson; accordingly, they are written in the first person. A number of verse riddles are quoted in the story.

The novel contains numerous ostentatious metatextual devices adverting to the fictional status of the work and the problematic truth-value of fiction, starting with its paradoxical title. The main protagonist, Vera, is a writer of crime-thrillers suffering from writer's block, which itself arises from her dissatisfaction with writing fiction rather than truth; she lectures on Roland Barthes' seminal postmodernist essay 'The Death of the Author'; the novel contains a story within a story whose own truth value is questioned in the novel and is never unambiguously resolved. The story within a story in turn calls into question Vera's own identity, and even her name: instead of being called Vera (Latin for 'true'), she may have been born Saga (Icelandic for 'story'), making the novel's subtitle a pun on her two names. The novel closes with an account of how the novel is itself Vera's own account of true events in her life, with the names of the characters changed, and published under the name of an author friend (implicitly Óttar himself).

== Plot summary ==
The main character of the story is Vera Elísabet Ragnarsdóttir, a crime-writer with writer's block; part-time lecturer at the Háskóli Íslands; devoted wife of Ingólfur and mother of two (Dagbjört and Ragnar); and member of a team loosely associated with WikiLeaks, including a journalist (Kári), a hacker (Patrekur or Patti), and a left-leaning activist (Ásta Lilja). Her mother Hugrún has fairly recently died and her father is hospitalised due to advanced Alzheimer's disease. These details give rise to three plot threads:

- Ingólfur is a violent and manipulative husband. One of Vera's students, Berglind, has fallen in love with Vera and emailed her, posing as a fan called Jónas, successfully establishing an intimate correspondence with Vera. The two arrange to meet. Berglind reveals her true identity and that she recognises that Vera is an abused wife. Vera, ashamed, forbids Berglind from further communication; but later agrees to meet her, and the two have sex; Berglind later helps Vera establish who has broken into her house; and the two finish the novel as friends. Through Berglind's invention and the character development prompted by the other plot threads, Vera ends the novel by leaving Ingólfur and starting a relationship with Kári, for whom she has discovered a mutual love in the course of the story.
- Vera witnesses a break-in at her investigative team's office, which seems to be a response to the attempts of a London-based Icelander later named as Loftur Baldursson to leak data to the group, about a threat to Iceland greater than the 2008–11 Icelandic financial crisis. Loftur decides not to leak the data, but the team have enough clues to begin to work the case. Loftur mentions that Vera's father was familiar with a neoliberal group called the Eimreiðarhópurinn, and she realises that he worked a case relating to a fictional member of the group, Baldur Loftsson, which leads to the third plot thread. Meanwhile, the team investigate Baldur Loftsson, who following the Crisis has been appointed to a mysterious position in the Ministry of Education, Science and Culture. Kári realises that it was Baldur's elder son Vignir who broke into the office; and the team conclude that their reluctant whistle-blower is Baldur's younger son Loftur. Loftur is gay and has a partner, John Oliver, in London but this has never been accepted by his family in Iceland. Kári and Vera fly to London to try to meet Loftur. Failing to find him in, they visit John and discover that Loftur has been depressed, and has mentioned a genetic research company called OriGenes; later, realising that something is amiss, they break into Loftur's flat and find him dead. They notify the police and leave the country. The UK police conclude that Loftur's death is a suicide. Having failed to get information from Loftur, the team then break into the Ministry of Education, Science and Culture, learning that Baldur has planned to loosen the protection of Icelandic genetic data in law 110/2000. Attending Loftur's funeral in Iceland, they learn from John that Loftur's laptop was missing. By hacking into the laptop, they discover it is in the hands of Vignir. The team go to Vignir's house, steal the laptop, and in doing so learn from Vignir that Loftur's suicide was an unintended consequence of Vignir going to London and taking the laptop. From the laptop they learn that the government had been planning to sell the bankrupt deCODE genetics and genealogical database Íslendingabók to the American company OriGenes. Kári and Patti prepare the story for release to the press.
- Vera's research into her father Ragnar's connections with Baldur Loftsson leads her to discover that Baldur was a suspect in a case in 1972, when Ragnar was investigating the disappearance of a left-wing radical, Agnar Jóhannesson and his baby daughter Saga. Baldur was cleared and Agnar supposed to have killed himself and his daughter. Moreover, her senile father mentions Agnar when she visits. Since Ragnar kept a detailed diary throughout his adult life, Vera seeks the relevant volume and finds it missing. By a happy coincidence, she discovers that her father's neighbour Hermann has been looking after it ever since finding it in the rubbish bin. Vera begins reading the diary, whose events take place during the World Chess Championship 1972 in Reykjavík. Her father and his colleague Kristófer have been presented with a verse riddle combining themes of medieval Icelandic literature and chess, threatening the life of the American chess-player Bobby Fischer; the riddle leads them to a location where they find another riddle, and so forth. They are then also tasked with investigating Agnar's disappearance. Part-way through Vera's reading of the diary, she mentions what she has been reading on Facebook. Thereafter, her flat is broken into and many items are stolen, including the diary. After a threat about the diary, Vera wrongly concludes that Agnar is still alive and that her father's doctor, Tinna, is Saga. Eventually realising that the diary was the real target of the break-in, Vera takes up Berglind's offer to use her underworld contacts to find the thief. Vera discovers it was Kristófer, Ragnar's colleague and friend of the family. She breaks into Kristófer's house, and reads that it was Agnar himself who had been setting the riddles; that Kristófer accidentally killed him while arresting him; and that Kristófer and Ragnar had decided to hide the killing, while Ragnar adopted Agnar's daughter Saga. This suggests that Vera is Saga, though Kristófer denies this. Vera travels to Copenhagen in search of Saga's mother Valdís, only to find that she had died of a heroin overdose in 1978. She concludes that her genetic parentage does not really matter, but realises that her name Vera E. Ragnarsdóttir can be reanalysed as 'Vera er Agnarsdóttir' ('Vera is Agnar's daughter').

The novel finishes with Vera settling down to write the story as a thriller novel, with the names changed, intending to publish it pseudonymously.

== Critical reception ==
- List of reviews
