= Arctic Chill =

2005 novel by Arnaldur Indriðason

- First edition (Icelandic)
- Author: Arnaldur Indriðason
- Original title: Vetrarborgin
- Translator: Bernard Scudder and Victoria Cribb
- Language: Icelandic
- Series: Detective Erlendur, #7
- Genre: Crime, Mystery novel
- Publisher: Harvill Secker
- Publication date: 2005 (orig.) & September 2008 (Eng. trans.)
- Publication place: Iceland
- Media type: Print (Hardcover, Paperback)
- Pages: 344 pp (Eng. trans.)
- ISBN: 978-1-84655-065-2 (Eng. trans.)
- OCLC: 221861654
- Preceded by: The Draining Lake

Arctic Chill (Icelandic: Vetrarborgin) is a 2008 translation of a 2005 crime novel by Icelandic author Arnaldur Indriðason, in his Detective Erlendur series.

The book is Indriðason's ninth novel. It is the first to be translated into English by someone other than Bernard Scudder, who died of a heart attack before his translation was complete. Victoria Cribb completed the translation.

== Plot ==
Erlendur and his team investigate the murder of a young Thai boy, found frozen in his own blood one midwinter day outside a rundown apartment block. The crime may be racially motivated and the team soon uncovers some unpleasant truths about modern Icelandic society. The subject of racism is examined, as well as immigration of Asians to Iceland.

== Reception ==
The novel was nominated for the Dublin Literary Award in 2010.

The Independent noted its "characteristic gloom" and called it a "highly believable mystery, seamlessly translated by the late Bernard Scudder and Victoria Cribb".

Publishers Weekly called it "stellar", noting that the author "imbues the self-doubting Erlendur with enormous depth" and produces a "stunning indictment of contemporary society".
