= The Draining Lake =

2004 crime novel by Arnaldur Indriðason

- First edition (Icelandic)
- Author: Arnaldur Indriðason
- Original title: Kleifarvatn
- Translator: Bernard Scudder, Éric Boury (French)
- Language: Icelandic
- Series: Detective Erlendur, #6
- Genre: Crime, mystery novel
- Publisher: Harvill Secker
- Publication date: 2004 (orig.) & August 2007 (Eng. trans. )
- Publication place: Iceland
- Media type: Print (hardcover, paperback)
- Pages: 400 pp (Eng. trans.)
- ISBN: 1-84655-095-5 (Eng. trans.)
- OCLC: 85898375
- Preceded by: Voices
- Followed by: Arctic Chill

The Draining Lake (Icelandic: Kleifarvatn) is a 2004 crime novel by Icelandic author Arnaldur Indriðason, an entry in the Detective Erlendur series.

The title is based on a real Icelandic lake Kleifarvatn, which began draining away in 2000 following an earthquake. In the novel, the dropping water level reveals a body long hidden in the lake. The Guardian reviewed the book as being one of the best modern crime fiction novels. The book won the Barry Award for the best crime novel in 2009.

The book has been reviewed many times, mainly in the English translation.

== Awards and honors ==
2009 Macavity Award: Nominee
