= Hnífur Abrahams =

Icelandic crime thriller

Hnífur Abrahams (Abraham's Dagger) is a 2007 crime thriller by Óttar M. Norðfjörð. It was a best-seller, and was nominated for the 2008 Drop of Blood prize, Iceland's main prize for crime fiction. The novel is in the style of Dan Brown's The Da Vinci Code.

== Synopsis ==
The events of the novel take place over the course of one day, set against a background of post-9/11 tension between Christian and Muslim identities in New York. The novel begins with the murder of Paul Feiler, an academic specialist in Abrahamic theology who works at the Metropolitan Museum of Art, by Charles Hogue, a CIA agent, shortly before Feiler is due to give a revelatory lecture at an academic conference in New York. Just before being apprehended by Hogue, Feiler writes a cryptic message, prominently including a verse from the Prophecies of Nostradamus, to his colleague James Donnelly, an Irish academic who is also at the conference; the message is delivered to Donnelly just after Feiler's murder. The novel focuses on Donnelly wringing a convoluted series of clues from Feiler's message: these lead him to discover that Feiler had got hold of the legendary Book of Abraham, supposedly acquired by the CIA shortly after its discovery among the Dead Sea Scrolls, and supposedly providing unusually early and authoritative evidence that the Binding of Isaac was actually, as held in many Islamic traditions, a binding of Ishmael. To some characters in the novel, this is seen to challenge Christian narratives of supremacy among the Abrahamic faiths and so American national security.

Since the message is written on a postcard of the Metropolitan museum, Donnelly and Swift proceed to Feiler's office there. They are followed by the detectives investigating Feiler's death, Fatíma Parker and John Russell. Parker and Russell confront Donnelly and Swift in Feiler's office. Donnelly convinces Parker and Russell that he was not involved in Feiler's murder; that the CIA might have been; and that they need to work together to unravel Feiler's clues. Meanwhile, Parker and Russell's boss Tom Fraser contacts Charles Hogue's boss Ben Rottenberg to tell him about the postcard; and Rottenberg sends another CIA agent, Jack Kerver, to the Metropolitan. When Kerver arrives in Feiler's office, Donnelly hides, and Parker and Russell allow Kerver to think that Swift is in fact Donnelly. Kerver apprehends Swift and leaves.

Donnelly, Parker and Russell proceed to Columbia University, where Donnelly hopes to find assistance and refuge from another academic friend of Feiler's, Richard Ruskin. They discover, however, that he died in a car accident that morning and infer (correctly) that he was murdered by the same person who murdered Feiler. They proceed to the Cathedral of St. John the Divine seeking a quiet place to work on Feiler's clues and, when they realise that they are about to be found by the police, to the Morgan Library & Museum, where they expect to find the book.

Meanwhile, the novel occasionally interweaves the activities of John A. Franklin, an Arab-American agent provocateur in Palestine. Back in New York, Hogue requests the book, which is held at an institution called Strategic Business Alliance Inc., with the intention of destroying it; but he finds it missing and realises that Feiler has stolen and hidden it. He returns to the CIA office at the Manhattan Institute for Policy Research to participate in the interrogation of Swift. A mysterious, high-ranking government official called Richard Hourani, on hearing of his old friend Feiler's death, flies from Washington to New York. Discovering that Swift has been apprehended, Hourani uses his influence to meet Swift, and engineers his escape from the CIA, apparently by knocking Hogue unconscious.

Hourani and Swift meet Donnelly, Parker, and Russell at the Morgan library, swiftly followed by Hogue. It transpires that Hogue, Russell, and Hourani are all members of the Project for the New American Century and it is Hourani, and not Hogue's CIA boss Rottenberg, who was behind the murder of Feiler; these three hold Donnelly, Swift and Parker at gunpoint. It turns out the book is not at the Morgan Library but rather than Feiler had left it with his neighbour María Morgan so the whole group proceeds there where they indeed find the book. Donnelly buys time by accusing Hourani of orchestrating the September 11 attacks as a false flag operation to justify the US-led invasions of Afghanistan and Iraq, and of planning another similar attack in Paris. To his own surprise, he turns out to be correct. Russell concludes that Hourani's position is immoral. Fraser hears about the disturbance at Morgan's flat and tips off Rottenberg and Kerver, who have already realised the connection of Hourani, Hogue, and Russell to the New American Century. Together, Rottenberg, Kerver, and Russell kill Hogue and apprehend Hourani, foiling Franklin's terrorist plot in Paris.

The novel ends with Donnelly starting a relationship with Parker.

== Translations ==
The novel was published in Dutch translation in 2009 as Abrahams mes.
