= Leyndardómar Reykjavíkur 2000 =

2000 Icelandic crime novel

- First edition
- Author: Arnaldur Indriðason, Árni Þórarinsson, Gunnar Gunnarsson, Viktor Arnar Ingólfsson
- Language: Icelandic
- Publication date: 2000
- Publication place: Iceland

Leyndardómar Reykjavíkur 2000 (The Reykjavík Mysteries 2000) is a crime novel which was written by multiple Icelandic authors, each author writing one chapter. The novel received negative reviews.

The first chapter was written by Viktor Arnar Ingólfsson and then the subsequent chapters by Hrafn Jökulsson, Birgitta Halldórsdóttir, Arnaldur Indriðason, Stella Blómkvist, Árni Þórarinsson and Gunnar Gunnarsson. The final chapter was composed by Kristinn Kristjánsson. The book was printed in 8000 copies and distributed promotionally at bookstores. It was written in less than two months.

Kolbrún Bergþórsdóttir commented that the beginning by Viktor Arnar Ingólfsson is fast-paced and successful and the following chapter by Hrafn Jökulsson has the funniest section of the book. This is followed by a clunky chapter by Birgitta Halldórsdóttir and a successful one by Arnaldur Indriðason. At that point there is a chapter by Stella Blómkvist which steers the story into such a cliché-ridden form that it can never recover. The story is ultimately "yet another addition to the failed crime stories which have been written in this country in the past few years" (Note: Icelandic: "Þannig verður bókin ekki annað en enn ein viðbótin við þær mislukkuðu sakamálasögur sem skrifaðar hafa verið hér á landi síðustu árin.")

Katrín Jakobsdóttir commented that the initial chapter by Viktor Arnar Ingólfsson is skillfully written and also comments positively on the chapters by Arnaldur Indriðason and Stella Blómkvist. She describes the story as suffering from an overloaded plot and lack of verisimilitude. She is particularly critical of the characterization:

The Achilles heel of the work is the characterization. To begin with, the main character, Páll the policeman, is stuck in a cliché which Dashiell Hammett and Raymond Chandler popularized; he is a lecherous and drunk policeman with a constant hangover in his own private search for justice. The recipe for the character is one part Jack Daniel's stirred with one part sex. In Icelandic crime stories women have generally been even more clichéd and this book is very much in that spirit. (Note: Icelandic: "Akkilesarhæll verksins er persónusköpunin. Í fyrsta lagi er aðalpersónan, Páll lögreglumaður, fastur í klisju sem Dashiell Hammett og Raymond Chandler gerðu fræga; er kvensamur og drykkfelldur lögreglumaður með sífellda timburmenn í eigin einkaleit að réttlæti. Uppskriftin að persónunni er skammtur af Jack Daniels, hrært við skammt af kynlífi. Í íslenskum glæpasögum hafa konur almennt verið enn klisjukenndari og þessi bók er mjög í þeim anda.")

In a later work, Katrín observed that the book was an interesting experiment and even though it had not been particularly successful it was indicative of the rapidly increasing vitality of Icelandic crime literature at the time.

== Sources cited ==
- "Glæpasögur, aldamótaljóð og bókaball". Morgunblaðið. 2000-04-11. p. 33.
- "Glæpasögur í öndvegi í vikunni". Dagur. 2000-04-11. p. 4.
- Katrín Jakobsdóttir (2000). "Bók vikunnar - Leyndardómar Reykjavíkur". Múrinn. Archived from the original on 2018-09-14.
- Katrín Jakobsdóttir (2001). Glæpurinn sem ekki fannst. Saga og þróun íslenskra glæpasagna. Bókmenntafræðistofnun Háskóla Íslands. Háskólaútgáfan.
- Kolbrún Bergþórsdóttir (2000-04-18). "Glæpasamsuða". Dagur. p. 19.
