= Árni Þórarinsson =

Icelandic writer

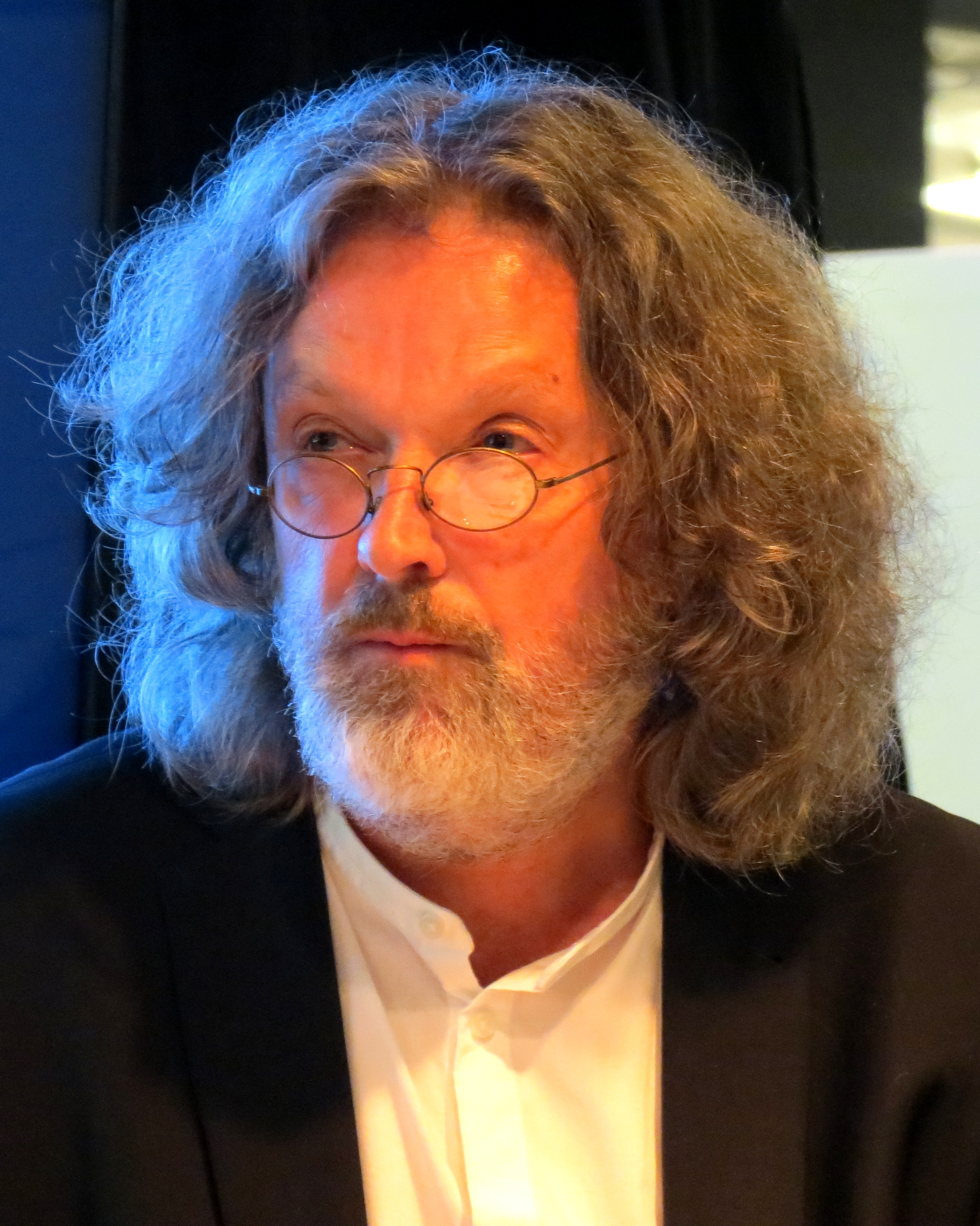
Árni Þórarinsson in 2015.

Árni Þórarinsson (born 1 August 1950 in Reykjavík) is an Icelandic writer. He completed a BA (1973) at the University of East Anglia. Norwich, England.

He started out a journalist and has worked in print, radio, and television. In 1989 he was on the board of the Reykjavík International Film Festival. His first novel was a crime novel published that same year. He has written several other crime novels.

== Bibliography ==
=== Einar crime novel series ===
- Nóttin hefur þúsund augu (1998)
- Hvíta kanínan (2000)
- Blátt tungl (2001)
- Tími nornarinnar (2005) (English translation by Anna Yates: Season of the Witch, 2012)
- Dauði trúðsins (2007)
- Sjöundi sonurinn (2008)
- Morgunengill (2010)
- Ár kattarins (2012)
- Glæpurinn - Ástarsaga (2013)
- 13 dagar (2016) (eng.: 13 Days)

== See also ==
- Leyndardómar Reykjavíkur 2000 (multi-author crime novel with one chapter by Árni)
- List of Icelandic writers
- Icelandic literature
