= Ingólfur Margeirsson =

Icelandic writer (1948–2011)

- Born: Ingólfur Örn Margeirsson; 4 May 1948
- Died: 16 April 2011 (aged 62)
- Occupations: Writer, Historian, Television Personality
- Known for: Knowledge of The Beatles

Ingólfur Örn Margeirsson (4 May 1948 – 16 April 2011) was an Icelandic writer, historian and television personality. Ingólfur worked as a journalist and editor of newspapers Alþýðublaðið and Helgarpósturinn. He also worked in radio and television production for public broadcaster RÚV, and served as the company's correspondent in Norway in the 1980s.

Ingólfur authored numerous books, and was nominated for the Nordic Council's Literature Prize in 1983 for the book Lífsjátning (English: Confession of Life), the biography of Icelandic singer Guðmunda Elíasdóttir. He is considered a pioneer in modern biographical writing in Iceland.

Ingólfur was well known for his expert knowledge of The Beatles, and hosted a radio series on the band in 1994. At the time of his death, he had recently completed a television series for RÚV on the last years of John Lennon.

Ingólfur was married to Jóhanna Jónasdóttir, a physician. They lived in Reykjavík.

== Bibliography ==
- Lífsjátning (1981)
- Erlend andlit (1982)
- Ragnar í Smára (1982)
- Allt önnur Ella (1986)
- Lífróður (1991)
- Hjá Báru (1992)
- Frumherjarnir (1994)
- Þjóð á Þingvöllum (1994)
- María, konan bak við goðsögnina (1995)
- Sálumessa syndara, ævi og eftirþankar Esra Péturssonar, geðlæknis og sálkönnuðar (1997)
- Þar sem tíminn hverfur (1998)
- Afmörkuð stund (2004)
