= Paradísarborgin =

2009 novel by Óttar M. Norðfjörð

Paradísarborgin ('the city of paradise') is a 2009 novel by Óttar M. Norðfjörð, published by Sögur in Reykjavík.

== Form ==
The novel is a third-person prose account divided into four books: 'Þeir missa sem eiga' ('those who own, lose'); 'Af mold' ('about earth'); 'Leitin að lífshamingju' ('the search for happiness in life'); and 'Til himna' ('to the skies'). These are divided into short, untitled sections with a pixelated greyscale image representing the fungus whose growth is key to the plot. These images get progressively larger as the book goes on.

The novel contains no proper nouns. The main character is known only as the 'einhenti maðurinn' ('the one-handed person'), and other characters in similar ways, often in relation to the main character: the 'eldri bróðir' ('elder brother'), his mother and father, the 'nágrannakona' ('woman from over the road'), and so forth. Likewise, the city where the story is set is unnamed, though its geography is consistent with Reykjavík. In the estimation of Ólafur Guðsteinn Kristjánsson, 'the decision to name neither characters nor the place is good, giving the work a certain exotic touch, even if it is clear what the model for the city is'.

Eiríkur Örn Norðdahl has compared the fantastic content of the work to that of José Saramago, 'if a tad more sci-fi-ish and less style-orientated', while Ólafur Guðsteinn Kristjánsson has compared it with The Stuff.

== Plot ==
The story focuses on the one-handed man, and is a character study of this self-conscious, somewhat anxious and melancholic figure. After living abroad and working as a portrait artist, he has moved home to his mother's following the death of his father seven months before the story takes place. The one-handed man was close to his father and feels the bereavement keenly, and has been unable to paint since.

The novel has two main plot threads:

- Over time and through his experiences and reflections, the one-handed man comes to terms with his father's death. He begins the novel carefully preserving his father's effects, but these are gradually taken over by the fungus. He meets the woman from over the road, who remembers his father fondly but is outgoing and inclined to live in the moment. Eventually the one-handed man begins a relationship with her. Forced from his family home by the fungus to staying in a tent on Öskjuhlíð, he begins to paint portraits of his father, eventually completing a series of twelve depicting him at different stages of life. The novel ends following the opening of an exhibition of these memorials with the one-handed man accepting the cyclical nature of human life.
- The novel opens with the one-handed man and his elder brother renovating their mother's basement. In doing so, they discover a large fungus; attempts to remove it simply make it stronger. The one-handed man starts to notice the fungus elsewhere in the town (including in the basement of the woman from over the road) and takes samples to a biologist, who identifies it as Coccidiodes kaputis and says that this is known for rare, unexplained outbreaks followed by unexpected remissions (prominently in 1872 and 1928). The spread of the fungus causes panic, but this is stilled by the mayor and his sidekick, a biochemist, who insist that the fungus is not dangerous and is caused by an underground oil leak: disinformation and the struggle for truth to prevail against consensus is a key theme of the novel. Some people begin to eat the fungus, finding that it makes them feel better, while a few others give up the town and start camping on Öskjuhlíð to escape the fungus; the mayor promotes the export of the fungus as a business opportunity. While looking after his nephew, the one-handed man witnesses the fungus causing his nephew a violent asthma attack and takes him to hospital; it later emerges that the staff, who are consuming the fungus, feed it to the one-handed man's nephew and older brother, convincing them that all is well. The one-handed man, however, moves to the tent-city, where he meets the woman from over the road, and later rescues his increasingly sick mother by bringing her there too. The one-handed man and his neighbour both help the biologist with his efforts to research and kill the fungus, which, however, all fail, providing the narrative with three moments of increasingly dramatic disappointed hope, and opportunities for the one-handed man's personal development. Eventually, as the fungus causes widespread morbidity and mortality, and the collapse of large numbers of buildings, people become convinced of its dangers. The one-handed man concludes that the fungus cannot be defeated by human intervention—rather that its growth is exacerbated by attempts to destroy or harvest it—and must be allowed to complete its natural cycle of growth and decay; he convinces his fellow citizens of this; and the novel concludes with evidence that this strategy is working.

Ólafur Guðsteinn Kristjánsson has pointed out that aspects of the first plot thread reflect Óttar's own artistic responses to the death of his own father. Commentators have noted the relevance of the second plot thread to the 2008–11 Icelandic financial crisis, though Eiríkur Örn has noted that 'the author did at some point stress that it in fact wasn't about the crisis'.
