= Guðmunda Elíasdóttir =

Icelandic opera singer and film actress

- Born: 23 January 1920; Bolungarvík, Iceland
- Died: 2 August 2015 (aged 95); Reykjavík, Iceland
- Citizenship: Iceland
- Education: Royal Danish Academy of Music
- Occupations: Opera singer; Actress
- Spouses: Henrik Knudsen (m. 1943; div. 1950) Sverir Kristjánsson (m. 1973; died 1977)
- Children: 3

Guðmunda Elíasdóttir (23 January 1920 – 2 August 2015) was an Icelandic opera singer and film actress. She began studying the piano under Erla Benediktsson and first performed with the Íslendingafélagið choir. Guðmunda performed for the Iceland Symphony Orchestra, the Broadway Grand Opera Association and the National Theatre of Iceland. She also did minor acting roles in Icelandic films. Guðmunda was appointed Knight's Cross of the Icelandic Order of the Falcon and a biography of her written by Ingólfur Margeirsson was published in 1981.

== Early life ==
On 23 January 1920, Guðmunda was born in Bolungarvík, Iceland. She was the daughter of the Bolungarvik chairperson Elías Þórarinn Magnússon and the housewife Sigríður Jensdóttir. Guðmunda had fifteen siblings and half-siblings combined. She was brought up in Bolungarvik for the first six years of her life before moving with her family to Látur, Aðalvík, then to Ísafjörður, and finally Reykjavík in 1932, following the death of her father by drowning in a sea accident. She worked as a babysitter in her teenage years and taught children Icelandic folk and children's songs.

== Career ==
Guðmunda began studying the piano under Erla Benediktsson and then relocated to Copenhagen to study singing with Dóra Sigurðsson at the Royal Danish Academy of Music in Copenhagen, following her passing the entry examination. She graduated in 1939. In early 1940, Guðmunda remained in Copenhagen for her post-graduate studies, studying under Kristian Riis, and then at Madame Fouresthier in Paris and Florence Bower in New York. She began performing for the Íslendingafélagið choir after she was heard from learnt the Íslendingafélagið í Kaupmannahöfn. Guðmunda worked with a coach to deepen her voice from a soprano to a mezzo-soprano.

From 1951 to 1953, she directed the Boys' Choir of the Free Church Congregation and staged the opera Miðilinn to critical acclaim. Guðmunda obtained employment with the Broadway Grand Opera Association in late 1953 before going on to sing about the Icelandic lands solo and areas from well-known operas in Canada. In mid-1954 she went on a tour of North America and then became the first Icelander to record a twelve-track album in the United States and the first on a 33 rpm album. She was employed the by the church organisation Federation of Church in mid-1955 and she refused other offers of work put to her by her agent. Guðmunda received an invitation to sing in five concerts organised by the Iceland Symphony Orchestra in late 1956 and went on to perform with an Association of Icelandic Singers cabaret at regional conventions the following year.

She returned to the United States doing various musical jobs and went back to Iceland in 1958 when her finances dried up. Guðmunda was invited to partake in the opera Carmen with fellow singers in the Icelandic Symphony Orchestra and then in Kiss Me, Kate with the National Theatre of Iceland. She began teaching singing around this time and did the job at the Akranes Music School, the Reykjavík Drama School and the Söngskólinn í Reykjavík. Guðmunda also operated an artificial flower factory. She accepted an offer to perform in The Fiddler on the Roof in 1969. Guðmunda's biography, Lífsjátningu, was written by Ingólfur Margeirsson and published in 1981. In mid-1983, she ventured to East Germany for more education and then to Denmark for voice coaching.

From this point, Guðmunda began acting in films. She was part of the supporting cast of each of the In the Shadow of the Raven (1988), Journey to the Center of the Earth and The Sky Palace (both 1994); Private Lives (1995); The Dance (1998); Witchcraft (1999) and Jar City (2006). Guðmunda also performed on other albums such as on the 1949 Music Association Choir 78 rpm album and on the four-album collection on the Stefán Íslandi song Áfram veginn released in 1987. She was a candidate for election to the Althing in the 2013 Icelandic parliamentary election. Guðmunda was appointed Knight's Cross of the Icelandic Order of the Falcon, and was made an honorary artist of the Althing in 1995.

== Personal life ==
She was a Catholic from her youth. Guðmunda was married first to the Danish master goldsmith Henrik Knudsen from 1943 to 1950 and then to the historian and writer Sverir Kristjánsson from early 1973 until his death in early 1977. There were three children of the first marriage. On 2 August 2015, she died at the Grund residential and nursing home in Reykjavík. Guðmunda was buried in Landakotskirkja, Reykjavik five days later.

== Character ==
Bryndís Schram in Guðmunda's obituary in Morgunblaðið wrote: "Guðmunda Elíasdóttir was an important and ambitious woman, blessed with an unusual light-heartedness and serenity. Even the most serious issues had funny sides when they were discussed with Mum. She had great social intelligence in addition to other rich talents she received in the cradle."
