= Voices (Indriðason novel) =

2002 novel by Arnaldur Indriðason

- First edition (Icelandic)
- Author: Arnaldur Indriðason
- Original title: Röddin
- Translator: Bernard Scudder
- Language: Icelandic
- Series: Detective Erlendur, #5
- Genre: Crime novel
- Publisher: Harvill Secker
- Publication date: 2002 (orig.) & August 2006 (Eng. trans. )
- Publication place: Iceland
- Media type: Print (Hardcover, Paperback)
- Pages: 320 pp (Eng. trans.)
- ISBN: 1-84655-033-5 (Eng. trans.)
- OCLC: 65470008
- Preceded by: Silence of the Grave
- Followed by: The Draining Lake

Voices (Icelandic: Röddin) is a 2006 translation of a 2003 crime novel by Icelandic author Arnaldur Indriðason, in his Detective Erlendur series. It was first published in English in August 2006. The Swedish translation of the novel (Änglarösten) won Sweden's Martin Beck Award for the best crime novel in translation.

An old hotel doorman, preparing to dress up as Father Christmas, is found stabbed to death in a compromising position in his miserable small room. Detective Erlendur, who hits a wall of disinterest while trying to find answers, books a room in the hotel. The more he discovers of the past of the deceased, and the more demimonde figures he meets in that allegedly decent hotel, the more phantoms he reveals from his own past.
