= Dauðans óvissi tími =

Dauðans óvissi tími ('Death's uncertain hour') is a 2004 novel by Þráinn Bertelsson, first published in Reykjavík by JPV Útgáfa. The title alludes to the seventeenth-century poem 'Um dauðans óvissa tíma' ('On death's uncertain hour') by Hallgrímur Pétursson. It is a darkly comical crime novel, but also to a significant extent a Roman à clef about the business activities of Björgólfur Guðmundsson during the 1990s and early 2000s, addressing a range of political, economic, and cultural questions of Iceland of its time, and has been characterised as 'eitt af brautryðjandi verkum á sviði íslenskra hrunbókmennta' ('one of the path-breaking works of Icelandic financial-crisis fiction'). It is the first in a series of books, the second being Valkyrjur (Reykjavík: JPV, 2005).

== Style ==
The novel is told in the third person through an omniscient narrator. Particularly in §I, events are often related out of chronological order, with clear date markers in chapter headings. The reader is frequently in possession of more information about events than the protagonists themselves.

The work is rich in metatextual literary allusions. For example, the banker Haraldur Rúriksson (himself a cipher for the real-life Björgólfur Guðmundsson), takes his patronym from the legendary viking founder of Kievan Rus'; the novel features a newspaper editor called Tómas Davíðsson, which name Þráinn himself used as a pen-name in his 1987 Tungumál fuglanna; and the bank robbers Þorgeir and Þormóður are based on the eponymous foster-brothers of the medieval Icelandic Fóstbræðra saga. The book states that the troubling Russian connections of Haraldur Rúriksson can be read about in the journal EuroCapital, in a transparent allusion to an article in Euromoney.

In the estimation of Hlynur Páll Pálsson, the novel also stands out for its 'choice gallery of characters. A great many characters are introduced into the story without confusing the reader, because behind each stands characterisation and wry stories which make each one unique'.

== Summary ==
The novel is divided into three sections:

- I Vegur óttans ('the road of fear') (pp. 13–90, chs 1-20)
- II Vegur dauðans ('the road of death') (pp. 91–358, chs 21-82)
- III Vegur dyggðarinnar ('the road of virtue') (359-71, chs 83-85)

§I focuses on recounting the career of Haraldur Rúriksson from 1986 to 2004. In a story paralleling the real-life Hafskip-affair, Haraldur attempts to establish a shipping company, Farskip, to compete with the dominant company, Gufuskipafélagið (a cipher for Eimskip), but is bankrupted by the dubious actions of his competitors. He takes up the invitation of a one-time employee, Magnús Valgarðsson, and an associate of his, Cameron Stout, to go into the alcopop business in post-communist St Petersburg. Rumours are reported that Haraldur defrauded his associates of their shares in the business just before it became enormously profitable and he successfully sells it to a major European brewery. This story parallels Björgólfur Guðmundsson's role in establishing Bravo Brewery and later selling it to Heineken. By 2004, through the privatisation of Iceland's banking system, Haraldur has been able to buy his old creditor, the Þjóðbankinn (a cipher for Landsbanki), and avenge past shame by buying the Gufuskipafélagið, via his holding company JOB Global Holdings (an allusion to the real-life Björgólfur's Samson ehf.).

§I also introduces us to Haraldur's best friend, Rúnar; two boys in a violent foster-home, Þorgeirr and Þórmóður; a would-be priest turned detective, Víkingur; and two eastern European psychopaths, the Czech Petra Vlkova and the Russian Vasilí Basmanov, who become a couple and begin working for St Petersburg's pre-eminent oligarch, Mikhail Moisejevitsj Levítan (founding, it later emerges, a security company-cum-protection racket called Opritsjnina Group).

§II comprises the bulk of the novel, intertwining accounts of two murder investigations headed by Víkingur.

1. Þorgeir has convinced Þormóður to join him in robbing a branch of the Þjóðbanki. Characteristically of these rather comical characters, the robbery goes badly, and Þorgeir kills a passerby and his dog with his sawn-off shotgun, and accidentally injures Þormóður in the process. The two flee to Þorgeir's house, but a neighbour recognises that Þorgeir may be one of the robbers and informs the police. Þorgeir takes Þormóður to hospital in Selfoss, where Þormóður receives treatment and pretends to have been on a several-week alcoholic bender and to remember nothing about the cause of his injury. Back at home, Þorgeir is ambushed by Víkingur and the Víkingasveitin, opens fire, and is killed. It emerges that had Þorgeir sold either his Cadillac or his shotgun, he could have gained legally more money that he even dreamed of winning through the bank robbery. By the end of the novel, it does not appear that the police have enough evidence to charge Þormóður.
2. Shortly after the foster brothers' robbery, the body of Haraldur's best friend Rúnar is discovered in Rúnar's home. Rúnar's dog has also been killed, and its head placed on Rúnar's decapitated body, with the letter O written in blood above Rúnar's corpse. His head is missing. The police have little evidence to go on, but suspect Eastern European organised crime, linking the handling of Rúnar's body with the Oprichnina. A nightwatchman at the Þjóðbanki headquarters later finds the head in Haraldur's private freezer there. Haraldur eventually explains that he found it placed in his car, presumably as a threat. The reader is privy to a meeting between Mikhail Moisejevitsj Levítan and Haraldur in which it becomes clear that Mikhail directed Petra and Vasilí to kill Rúnar in order to cow Haraldur into acceding to his wishes. Haraldur tips off the police that Petra and Vasilí are the killers and that they are in Iceland. The reader also learns that Petra lost a lot of money when shares in a DNA research company VikingDNA (a cipher for deCODE genetics) collapsed and has decided to seek recompense from the director, Lárus Jóhannsson (corresponding to Kári Stefánsson). Víkingur and the Víkingasveitin make a helicopter raid on the island where Petra and Vasilí have met Lárus. The criminals are killed in a gunfight and the news successfully covered up.

§III is a coda in which Haraldur's old business associate Magnús Valgarðsson, dying of cancer, confidentially confesses to Víkingur that he was the indirect cause of Rúnar's death. Lacking the resources to prosecute Haraldur for defrauding him but still seeking some kind of justice, he had the idea of transferring his ownership of the shares in the old alcopop company to Mikhail Moisejevitsj Levítan, in the knowledge that Mikhail would not fail to do what was necessary to win for himself the billions owed to Magnús. Mikhail had, however, gone further than Magnús had reckoned on.

== Reviews ==
- Úlfhildur Dagsdóttir. „Dauðans óvissi tími.“ Bókmenntir.is November 2014.
- Hlynur Páll Pálsson. „Samtíminn er lyginni líkastur.“ Fréttablaðið, 4 December 2004, p. 92.
- Steinunn Inga Óttarsdóttir. „Fjörug fóstbræðrasaga.“ Morgunblaðið, 4 December 2004, p. 13.
- „Ný bók Þráins hjá lögfræðingi.“ Fréttablaðið, 5 September 2004, p. 46.
- Illugi Jökulsson. „Rússneska mafían kemur til íslands.“ DV, 15 November 2004, p. 25.
- Ágúst Borgþórs. „Slarkfær reyfari.“ Kistan.is, November 2004.
