= China Kadoorie Biobank =

Genomic database

The China Kadoorie Biobank is acquiring genomic data on half a million Chinese participants. In 2022 Genome-wide genotyping had been conducted for more than 100,000 participants using custom-designed Axiom arrays.

It collected questionnaire, physical data and blood samples on 510,000 men and women aged between 30 and 79 from 10 regions in China between 2004-2008 with the aim of investigating chronic diseases (e.g. heart attack, stroke, diabetes, and cancer). Participants have been linked to mortality registers and nationwide health systems and a sub-group of 25,000 are retested every few years. It is a joint venture by the University of Oxford's Clinical Trial Service Unit & Epidemiological Studies Unit and the Chinese Academy of Medical Sciences.

Research based on the biobank published by the American Thoracic Society in 2018 found that respiratory disease hospitalization or death were 36% higher among people who used wood or coal for cooking compared to those who used electricity or gas.

A study published in Heart based on the biobank found that people who ate an egg a day had a lower incidence of cardiovascular disease overall than those who ate no eggs. They had a 25% lower incidence of hemorrhagic stroke, and a 12% reduction in risk of ischemic heart disease.

A study published in 2022 examined the relative risk of mortality associated with five individual and combined lifestyle factors - never smoking or quitting not for illness, no excessive alcohol use, being physically active, healthy eating habits, and healthy body shape - and established that they could be associated with substantial gains in life expectancy in the Chinese population.
