= Viktor Arnar Ingólfsson =

Icelandic writer of crime fiction (born 1955)

Viktor Arnar Ingólfsson (born 12 April 1955, in Akureyri) is an Icelandic writer of crime fiction. He has a B.Sc. degree in civil engineering and, in addition to having a successful career as a writer, he continues to work full-time at the Public Roads Administration in Iceland.

Viktor Arnar has twice been the Icelandic nominee for the Glass Key award, which is awarded by Skandinaviska Kriminalselskapet (Crime Writers of Scandinavia). Three of his five novels have been translated into German, and Flateyjargáta was published in English as The Flatey Enigma in February 2012. His novel Afturelding was the basis of the Icelandic television series Mannaveiðar, english title I Hunt Men (2008). His novel Flateyjargáta was the basis of the Icelandic television series Flateyjargátan, english title The Flatey Enigma (2018).

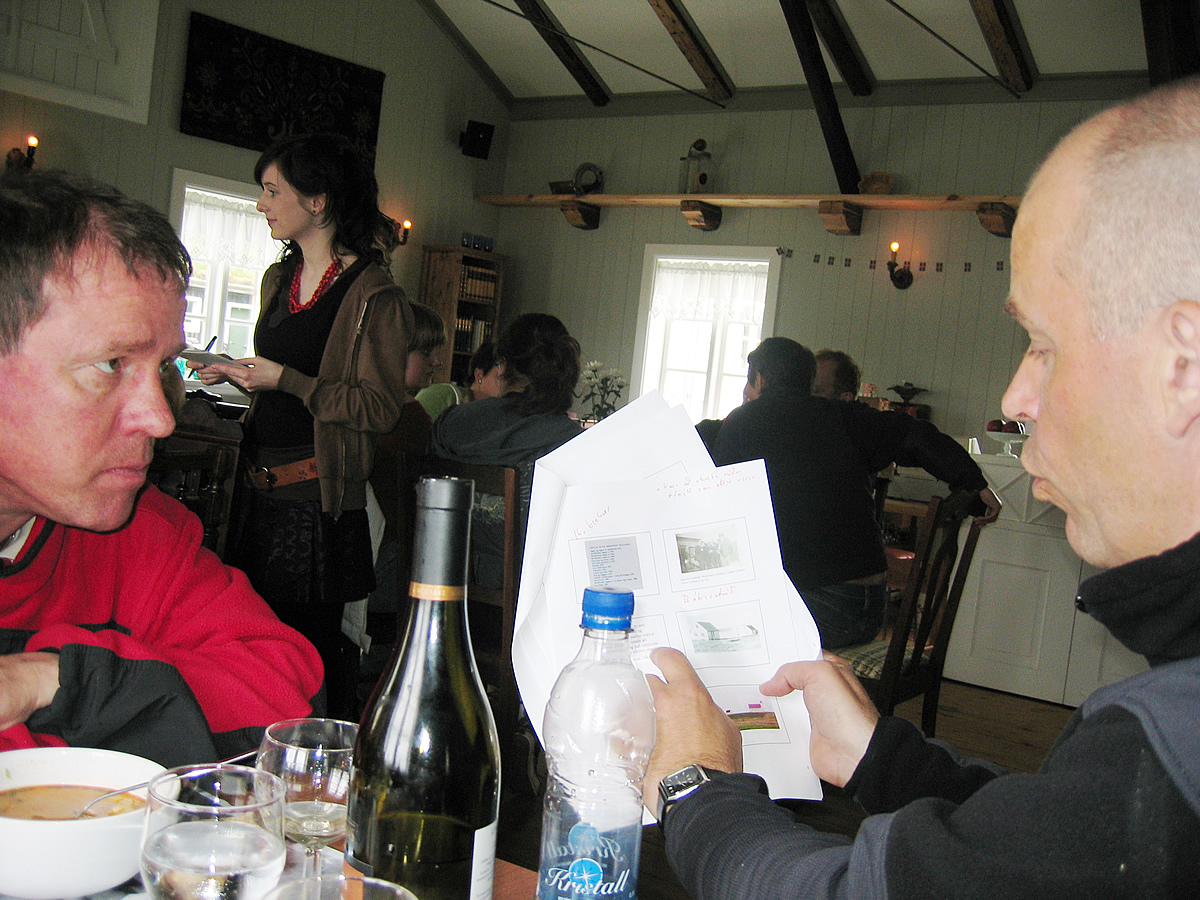
Viktor Arnar (right) in Flatey

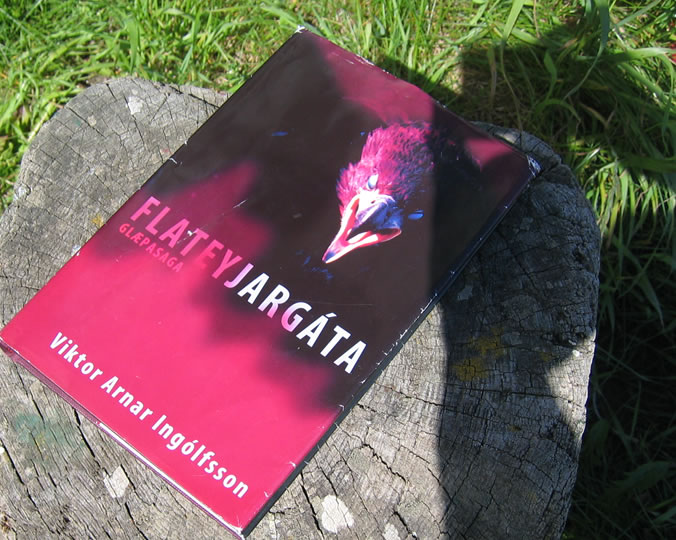
Flateyjargáta (Flatey mystery) by Viktor Arnar

== Bibliography ==
- Dauðasök (1978)
- Heitur snjór (1982)
- Engin spor (1998) (English translation by Björg Árnardóttir & Andrew Cauthery, House of Evidence, 2012)
- Leyndardómar Reykjavíkur 2000 (2000) (one chapter)
- Flateyjargáta (2003) (English translation by Brian FitzGibbon, The Flatey Enigma, 2012)
- Afturelding (2005) (English translation by Björg Árnardóttir & Andrew Cauthery, Daybreak, 2013)
- Sólstjakar (2009) (English translation by Björg Árnardóttir & Andrew Cauthery, Sun On Fire, 2014)
