= Act on Health Sector Database =

The Act on Health Sector Database, also known as Act on Health Sector Database, No. 139/1998, the Health Sector Database Act and in media by other colloquial names, was a 1998 act of the Icelandic Parliament which allowed the Icelandic government to grant a license to a private company for the creation of a national biological database to store health information which could be used for research. The act was noted for boldly introducing policy related to biobanks and was the subject of controversy.

deCODE genetics did most of the lobbying for the act and was the beneficiary of the license to create the database.

== Controversies ==
The passing of this act spurred international discussion about what policies were already in place and what differences in policy existed among biobanks.

The establishment of a national database for all Icelandic citizens raised discussion about the nature of the informed consent process for the project.
