= Óttar M. Norðfjörð =

Icelandic writer

Óttar Martin Norðfjörð (born 1980) is an Icelandic writer, both of crime fiction and poetry. He has a master's degree in philosophy from the University of Iceland. His first novel, Barnagælur, was published in 2005. His crime novels have been translated into Dutch, German and Spanish.

== Biography ==
Óttar was born in Reykjavík, growing up in Norðurmýri, the son of the architects Sverrir Norðfjörð (17 June 1941 – 17 June 2008) and his Czech-born wife Alena Friðrikka Anderlova (b. 21 January 1945). A chess competitor at junior school, he proceeded to study at Menntaskólinn við Hamrahlíð, and graduated in spring 2000 with a specialism in the hard sciences. He proceeded to take an MA in philosophy at the University of Iceland, presenting a final dissertation on the philosophy of the Old Norse poem Hávamál He has continually studied visual arts, which has influenced his work, and in 2004 he held an exhibition of his paintings at Gallari Tukt.

Óttar's biography Hannes: nóttin er blá, mamma was for many weeks at the top of the Eymundsson best-seller list and was among Iceland's best-selling books of 2006. In 2007, his novel Hnífur Abrahams was the 15th best-selling book in Iceland.

Óttar is married to Elo Vazquez. They have collaborated on some projects, including cartoons which appeared in the Reykjavík Grapevine, and directing a music video for the Spanish band I Am Dive in 2013.

=== Political and social activism ===
Óttar has defined himself as a politically orientated artist. He was a candidate for the party Nýtt Afl in the Icelandic parliamentary election, 2003. He has been an active campaigner for Torfusamtökin, an organisation seeking to preserve Reykjavík's architectural heritage. Óttar organised a campaign to prevent houses on Laugavegur from demolition. Óttar was one of various authors who were noted for their participation in the 2008-9 Kitchenware Revolution. In summer 2013, Óttar protested against an incident of police violence, in which a woman was knocked over against a bench in the street and in which the police commented that the positioning of the bench had been "unfortunate", by circulating a photograph of himself sitting on the bench holding a sign saying "This bench is unfortunate".

== Works ==
Norðfjörð's main works include:

=== Poetry ===
- Grillveður í október (Barbeque-Weather in October) (Nýhil, 2004)
- Sirkus (Circus) (Nýhil, 2005)
- A-Ö (Nýhil, 2006)

=== Cartoons and satires ===
- Jón Ásgeir & afmælisveislan (Jón Ásgeir and the Birthday Party) (Sögur, 2007)
- Tíu litlir bankastrákar (Ten Little Banker-boys) (Sögur, 2008)
- Snillingurinn: Ævisaga Hannesar Hólmsteinars ([n. pub.], [2009])
- Íslenskir kapítalistar: 1918-1998 ([Óttar Martin Norðfjörð], [2011])

=== Literary novels ===
- Barnagælur (Child’s Play) (Mál og menning, 2005)
- Paradísarborgin (The Paradise City) (Sögur, 2009)
- Örvitinn eða; hugsjónamaðurinn (The Idiot, or, the Visionary) (Nýhil, 2010)
- Lygarinn: Sönn saga (The Liar: A True Story) (Sögur, 2011)

=== Crime novels and thrillers ===
- Hnífur Abrahams (Abraham’s Dagger) (Sögur, 2007) [translated into Dutch]
- Sólkross (Sun Cross) (Sögur, 2008) [translated into Spanish and German]
- Áttablaðarósin (The Eight Pointed Rose) (Sögur, 2010)
- Una (Una) (Sögur, 2012)
- Blóð hraustra manna (The Blood of Brave People) (Vaka-Helgafell, 2013)

=== Biography ===
- Arkitektinn með alpahúfuna: Ævisaga Sverris Norðfjörð (The Architect with the Beret: The Life of Sverrir Norðfjörð) (Nýhil, 2010)
- Teflt fyrir augað: 12 bestu skákir Sverris Norðfjörð, ed. by Óttar M. Norðfjörð (Sögur, 2010)
