= Silence of the Grave =

2001 crime novel by Arnaldur Indriðason

- First edition (Icelandic)
- Author: Arnaldur Indriðason
- Original title: Grafarþögn
- Translator: Bernard Scudder (English); Éric Boury (French)
- Language: Icelandic
- Series: Detective Erlendur, #4
- Genre: Crime, mystery novel
- Publisher: Harvill Press
- Publication date: 2001 (orig.) & 5 May 2005 (Eng. trans.)
- Publication place: Iceland
- Media type: Print (hardback & paperback)
- Pages: 224 pp (Eng. trans.)
- ISBN: 1-84343-185-8 (Eng. trans.)
- OCLC: 57574468
- Preceded by: Jar City
- Followed by: Voices

Silence of the Grave (Icelandic: Grafarþögn) is a crime novel by Icelandic writer Arnaldur Indriðason. Set in Reykjavík, the novel forms part of the author's regionally popular Murder Mystery Series, which star Detective Erlendur. Originally published in Icelandic in 2001, the English translation by Bernard Scudder, in 2005, won the British Crime Writers' Association Gold Dagger award for best crime novel of the year.

Human bones are found buried in a construction site in Grafarholt. The police starts investigating only to uncover dark secrets from 70 years ago and in a parallel narrative we hear the story of an abused woman from the same time, who is somehow connected to the bones.

== Awards and nominations ==
- 2003 Glass Key award (for Nordic crime fiction novel)
- 2005 Gold Dagger (from the British Crime Writers' Association)
- 2006 Barry Award (nomination)
