= Íslendingabók (genealogical database) =

Database of Icelandic genealogy

Íslendingabók (Icelandic pronunciation: [ˈistlɛntɪŋkaˌpouk], literally 'book of Icelanders') is a database created by the biotechnology company deCODE genetics and Friðrik Skúlason, attempting to record the genealogy of all Icelanders who have ever lived, where sources are available. Íslendingabók takes its name from the first history of Iceland, commonly attributed to Ari the Wise.

== History ==
Genealogy has been a pastime of Icelanders for centuries, with its roots in medieval political agenda. Texts from early ages of Icelandic history, containing genealogical information, have survived into the modern age and scholars and enthusiasts have maintained the genealogy knowledge through the ages. In early 1988, Friðrik Skúlason marketed a software program for registering family information and started to compile a database of Icelandic genealogy with the aim to register all available Icelandic genealogy information. In 1997, deCODE genetics and Skúlason entered into an agreement to speed up the compilation of the database and to enable deCODE to utilize the database in the company's medical genetics research. In January 2003, Íslendingabók was made publicly available on the web to all Icelanders, free of charge. The launch of the website received great attention and within a month, a third of the population had applied for access to the database. In celebration of the website's 10th anniversary, founders of Íslendingabók, in collaboration with University of Iceland, launched an app-creation competition amongst university students. The winning team, named Sad Engineers Studio, received a prize of one million IKR. Their solution was implemented for Android smartphones and received international media attention.

== Content and accuracy ==
As of February 2025, the database contains information on just over one million individuals, including a little over half of the total population of Iceland since the settlement of the island in the 9th century. Coverage amongst Icelanders born in the 20th and 21st centuries is 100% and the database is estimated to contain 95% of individuals born since 1700. Each individual's record contains information on parents, siblings, mates and children along with birthdates, death dates and places of birth and death. Connections toward parents have been 95.5% filled for those born in the 20th century. A study on mitochondria mutation using Íslendingabók suggested the maternal lineages of the database to be 99.3% accurate. In a study on distribution of descendants, rate of false paternities is claimed to be 1.49% per generation, including laboratory handling errors.

== Usage ==
Access to the Íslendingabók website is limited to individuals with a kennitala, the Icelandic identification number. Each user can view information on his or her extended family, which by definition are all ancestors of the user along with descendants of the user's great-grandparents. Additionally, every user can view information on all individuals born prior to the year 1700. Users have the ability to trace their relation to any individual the database contains. In February 2020, Íslendingabók had 241,000 registered users, two thirds of the 364,000 inhabitants. An average of more than 2,600 users log into the website every day.

The database is used in deCODE's research on an anonymous form where names and identifications of individuals have been removed in a process overseen by the Icelandic Data Protection Authority. If any discrepancies between genetic and genealogic information are discovered in the research, the data is simply removed from the study and no corrections are made on the database.

== Maintenance ==
More than 160 person-years have been invested in the construction and maintenance of Íslendingabók. Equal emphasis is on plowing through historical data as maintaining information on the current population, adding newborns and updating connections and relationship. Users of the website have provided more than 50,000 corrections and additions to the genealogy in the database.

== Reception and controversy ==
Although criticism of the wider project to create an Icelandic Health Sector Database combining genealogical, medical, and genetic records has been extensive, Íslendingabók itself has been popular:

the responses to the genealogies on the Web were overwhelming. Overnight, the Book of Icelanders became a popular pastime. In a few weeks, one hundred thousand Icelanders, a substantial proportion of the total population of three hundred thousand, requested a password to explore their relations with neighbours, colleagues, and friends [...] Soon the database became a party game. Newspaper reports and discussions on the Web indicate that families actively search for genealogical connections during informal social occasions, including dinner parties.

In 2009 it was reported to receive about 1000 logins per day on weekends and 1500 on weekdays.

The database has, however, been controversial for revealing relationships that people had attempted to hide, particularly in cases of illegitimacy.

The database was the subject of a lawsuit by a publisher of genealogical studies used by the database, Genealogic Islandorum, on the grounds that deCODE had plagiarised their publications; the case failed in the Icelandic supreme court.
