= FRISK Software International =

Icelandic software company

- Type: Private
- Industry: Software, Computer Security, Security software
- Founded: Reykjavík, 1993
- Founder: Friðrik Skúlason
- Fate: Acquired in August 2012
- Successor: CYREN
- Headquarters: Reykjavík, Iceland
- Key people: Friðrik Skúlason (Chief Research Officer); Vesselin Bontchev
- Products: F-Prot Antivirus; F-Prot AVES; Espólín; Púki
- Website: frisk.is

FRISK Software International (established in 1993) was an Icelandic software company that developed F-Prot antivirus and F-Prot AVES antivirus and anti-spam service. The company was founded in 1993. It was acquired by Cyren in 2012.

== History ==
The company was founded in 1993. Its name is derived from the initial letters of the personal name and patronymic of Friðrik Skúlason, its founder. Dr. Vesselin Vladimirov Bontchev, a computer expert from Bulgaria, best known for his research on the Dark Avenger virus, worked for the company as an anti-virus researcher.

F-Prot Antivirus was first released in 1989 as Lykla-Pétur (a reference to Saint Peter), making it one of the longest lived anti-virus brands on the market. It was the world's first with a heuristic engine. It is sold in both home and corporate packages, of which there are editions for Windows and Linux. There are corporate versions for Microsoft Exchange, Solaris, and certain IBM eServers.

The company has also produced a genealogy program called Espólín and Púki, a spellchecker with additional features. Espólín later became Íslendingabók, a genalogy website. In 1988 Púki was the best selling computer software in Iceland.

In Summer of 2012, FRISK was acquired by Cyren, an Israeli-American provider of security products.

== F-Prot Antivirus ==
F-Prot Antivirus
- Developer: FRISK Software International
- Stable release: 6.0.9.6 / 29 November 2011; 14 years ago
- Operating system: Microsoft Windows, Microsoft Exchange, Linux, BSD, Solaris, AIX, IBM eServers, *nix
- Type: Antivirus software
- License: Proprietary
- Website: www.cyren.com

F-Prot Antivirus (stylized F-PROT) is an antivirus product developed by FRISK Software International. It is available in related versions for several platforms. It is available for Microsoft Windows, Microsoft Exchange Server, Linux, Solaris, AIX and IBM eServers.

FRISK Software International allows others to develop applications using their scanning engine, through the use of a SDK. Many software vendors use the F-Prot Antivirus engine, including SUSE.

F-Prot Antivirus reached end-of-life on July 31, 2021, and is no longer sold.

== Friðrik Skúlason ==
Friðrik Skúlason, also sometimes known as "Frisk", is the founder of FRISK Software International and one of the founding members of CARO (Computer Antivirus Research Organization). He originally developed F-Prot Antivirus while doing computer support work. He was, for many years, the technical editor of the Virus Bulletin. Skúlason served as the head of FRISK Software International until its eventual acquisition by Cyren in 2012, after which he joined Cyren as the vice-president of Antivirus technologies.
