= Norðurmýri =

Neighborhood of Reykjavík, Iceland

Coordinates: 64°8′21″N 21°55′9″W

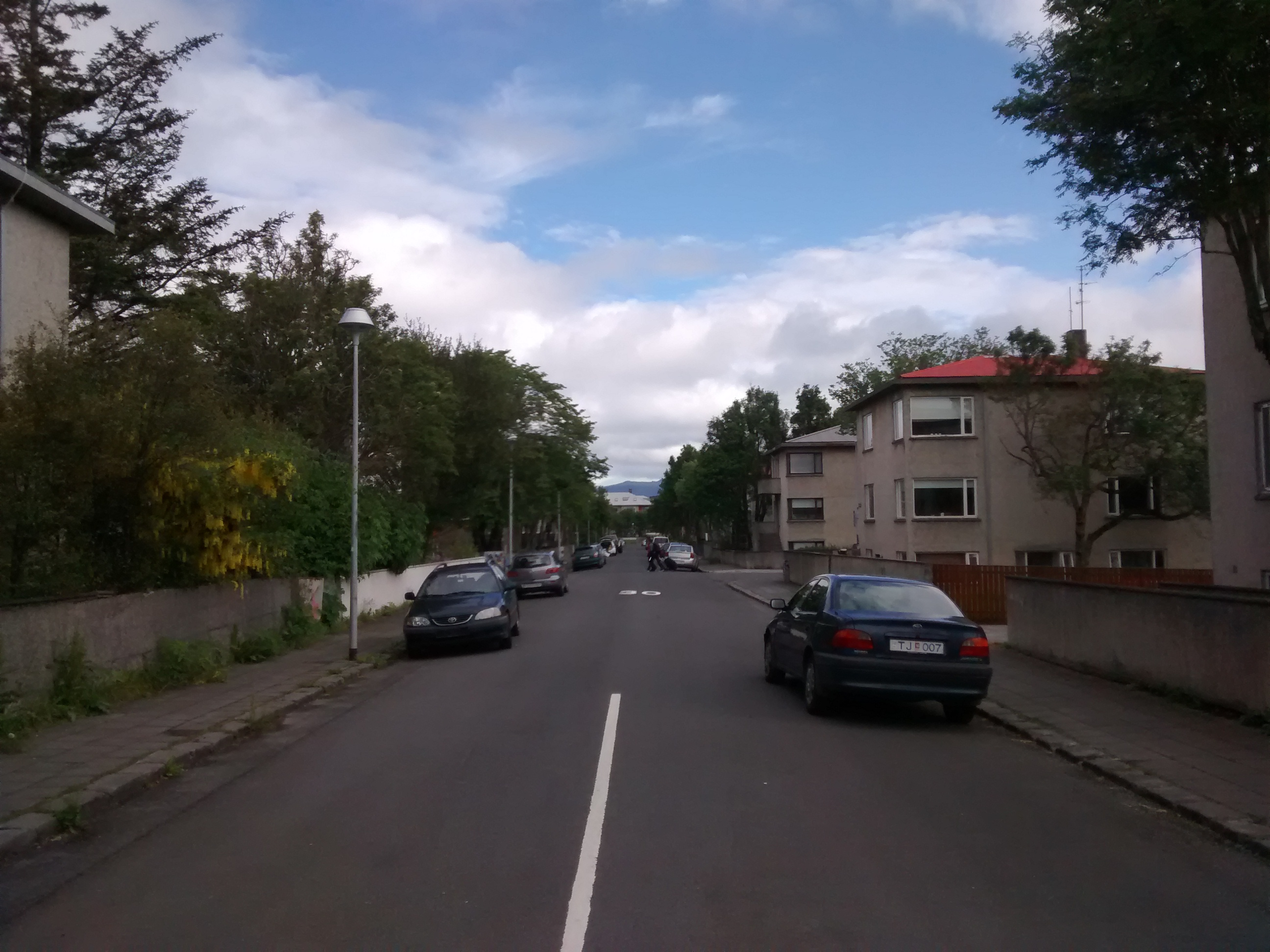
Norðurmýri

Norðurmýri (Icelandic pronunciation: [ˈnɔrðʏrˌmiːrɪ]) is a neighborhood of central Reykjavík, Iceland.

Norðurmýri has been the home of a number of artists and scholars. The Reykjavík Art Museum (Kjarvalsstaðir) is located nearby.
