= Jar City (film) =

2006 Icelandic film by Baltasar Kormákur

- Directed by: Baltasar Kormákur
- Written by: Baltasar Kormákur; Arnaldur Indriðason
- Produced by: Baltasar Kormákur; Agnes Johansen; Lilja Pálmadóttir
- Starring: Ágústa Eva Erlendsdóttir; Ingvar Eggert Sigurðsson
- Cinematography: Bergsteinn Björgúlfsson
- Edited by: Elísabet Ronaldsdóttir
- Music by: Mugison
- Release dates: 20 October 2006 (Iceland); 21 October 2007 (London Film Festival); 20 September 2008 (UK wide release)
- Running time: 91 minutes
- Countries: Iceland; Germany; Denmark
- Language: Icelandic
- Box office: $748,315

Jar City (Icelandic: Mýrin – "The Bog") is a 2006 Icelandic film written and directed by Baltasar Kormákur. It is based on Mýrin, a 2000 novel written by Arnaldur Indriðason and released in English as Jar City.

Kormákur is in the midst of producing an English-language remake, also called Jar City, which will be set in Louisiana.

== Plot ==
Erlendur, a world-weary cop comes to believe the recent murder of Holberg, a middle-aged loner is linked to a case of possible rape three decades earlier by a group of friends and a corrupt cop. Holberg had a photo of the grave of girl who died young. Initially, people who know something are reluctant to talk. Working through, Erlendur finds it linked to neurofibromatosis, a rare disease among Nordics. One thing leads to another and he puts the pieces together. Örn, a geneticist father loses his young daughter to neurofibromatosis and illegally accesses data to link his degenerate father to the other girl who died years before. Erlendur also unravels what happened to Holberg's associate Gretar, who has been missing for decades. Erlendur also has to deal with his drug addict daughter, who became homeless and owes money to a dealer.

Like the book on which it is based, the film is implicitly a semi-critique of the gene-gathering work of the Icelandic company deCODE genetics.

== Cast ==
- Ingvar E. Sigurðsson as Erlendur
- Ágústa Eva Erlendsdóttir as Eva Lind
- Björn Hlynur Haraldsson as Sigurður Óli
- Ólafía Hrönn Jónsdóttir as Elínborg
- Atli Rafn Sigurðsson as Örn
- Kristbjörg Kjeld as Katrín
- Þorsteinn Gunnarsson as Holberg
- Theódór Júlíusson as Elliði
- Þórunn Magnea Magnúsdóttir as Elín
- Guðmunda Elíasdóttir as Theodóra
- Walter Grímsson as Handrukkarar
- Sveinn Ólafur Gunnarsson
- Magnús Ragnarsson as Lögfræðingur
- Rafnhildur Rósa Atladóttir as Kola
- Jón Sigurbjörnsson as Albert

== Soundtrack ==
The score was composed by Mugison.

Track listing:

1. "Til eru fræ"
2. "Sveitin milli sanda"
3. "Bíum bíum bambaló"
4. "Erlendur"
5. "Elliði"
6. "Á Sprengisandi"
7. "Fyrir átta árum"
8. "Áfram veginn – Nikka"
9. "Áfram veginn"
10. "Halabalúbbúlúbbúlei"
11. "Malakoff"
12. "Bí bí og blaka I"
13. "Myrra"
14. "Kirkjuhvoll"
15. "Bí bí og blaka II"
16. "Dagný"
17. "Heyr, Ó Guð raust mína"
18. "Lyrik"
19. "Nú hnígur sól"
20. "Sofðu unga ástin mín"
21. "Ódur til Hildigunnar"
22. "Svefnfræ"
23. "Fræsvefn"
24. "Svefnfræ, söngur"
25. "Nú legg ég augun aftur"

Incidental music: Extract from George Frideric Handel's "The Arrival of the Queen of Sheba" from the oratorio Solomon

== Prizes ==
The film was awarded the 2007 Crystal Globe Grand Prix at the 42nd Karlovy Vary International Film Festival. It also won the Breaking Waves Award at the 15th Titanic International Film Festival in Budapest with a €10,000 prize; the film was screened with the title Bloodline.

== DVD ==
A Blockbuster Exclusive Region 1 DVD was released in the U.S. and Canada. Otherwise, the film was not released commercially in America. It has also been released on DVD in Europe and is available on iTunes.
