= FinnGen =

Finnish genomic research organisation

- Headquarters: Helsinki, Finland
- Website: https://www.finngen.fi/

The FinnGen project was launched in 2017 with the aim of collecting biological samples from 500,000 participants in Finland over six years with the aim of improving health through genetic research. This is about 10% of the population. It is hoped that it will be a springboard for better diagnostics and new therapies. It is the key to Finland's Health Sector Growth Strategy for Research and Innovation Activities.

== Activity ==
It is a public–private partnership between Finnish universities, the National Institute for Health and Welfare, the Finnish Red Cross Blood Service, the biobanks, which are mostly owned by independent hospital districts, hospitals, and pharmaceutical companies including Abbvie, AstraZeneca, Biogen, Celgene, Genentech, GSK, Janssen, Maze Therapeutics, Merck, Novartis, Pfizer, and Sanofi. It has funding of approximately €80 million, some of which has come from the companies. €20 million has come from Business Finland. 500,000 blood samples are to be collected over six years by a nation-wide network of Finnish biobanks and they will be matched with national health records, 98% of which are available in an electronic format. It claims that it will manage the anonymous health registry and the genomic data without compromising the privacy and integrity of participants.

The study is using Thermo Fisher Scientific's Axiom Genotyping Solution. In February 2021, the FinnGen data resource contained data from more than 321,000 biobank sample donors.

DNA samples had already been collected from about 230,000 Finns for earlier studies. The 2013 Biobank Act permitted samples to be transferred to biobanks and made available to researchers. These earlier samples were collected from people who are now getting older, so they can be related to many more disease events than the UK Biobank. The concept of ‘broad consent’ means that participants do not have to be asked to consent for their samples to be used in each project. The Finnish Biobank Cooperative was established in 2017. The first summary of results was released to the public on January 14, 2020 and will be updated every 6 months, at a one year delay with the internal findings.

== History ==
Finnish people descend from a small founder population with little consanguinity. The low level of variants in the population structure means the chances that any disease association findings will have statistical significance are greater. Genetic discoveries can be made more easily than in more heterogeneous populations.
