= Arnaldur Indriðason =

Icelandic writer

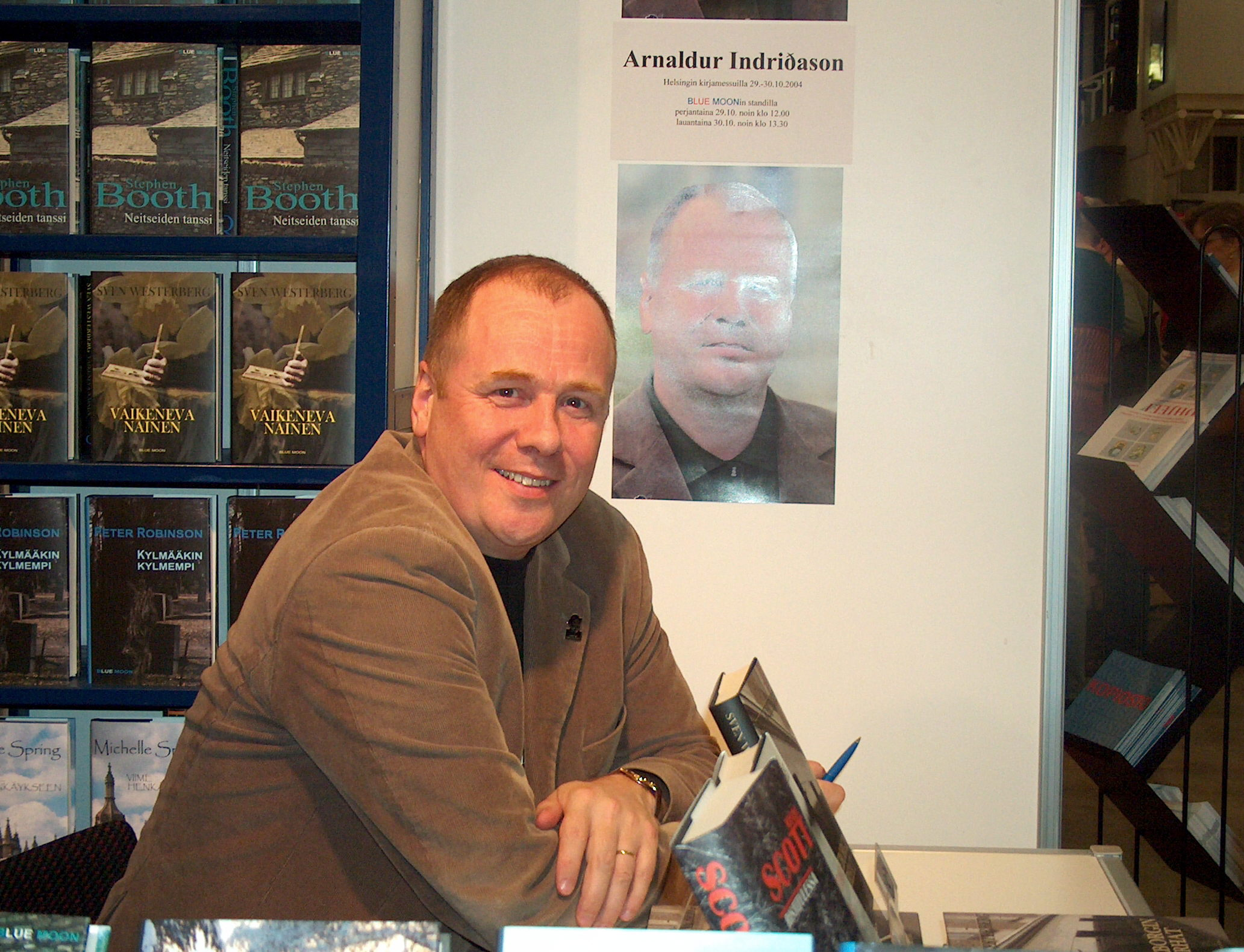
- Arnaldur Indriðason at the Helsinki Book Fair, Finland, 2004
- Born: 28 January 1961 (age 65); Reykjavík, Iceland
- Writing career
- Genre: crime fiction

Arnaldur Indriðason (pronounced [ˈartnaltʏr ˈɪntrɪðasɔn]; in English, written as Indridason; born 28 January 1961) is an Icelandic writer of crime fiction; his most popular series features the protagonist Detective Erlendur.

== Early life ==
Arnaldur was born in Reykjavík on 28 January 1961, the son of writer Indriði G. Þorsteinsson. He graduated with a degree in history from the University of Iceland (Háskóli Íslands) in 1996. He worked as a journalist for the newspaper Morgunblaðið from 1981 to 1982, and later as a freelance writer. From 1986 to 2001, he was a film critic for Morgunblaðið.

== Publications ==
His first book, Sons of Earth (Synir duftsins) came out in 1997, the first in the series with Detective Erlendur. The first two novels in the series have not yet been translated into English. As of 2013, the series included 14 novels. Arnaldur is considered one of the most popular writers in Iceland in recent years — frequently topping bestseller lists. In 2005, his books were 7 of the 10 most popular titles borrowed in Icelandic libraries. In 2006, his Erlendur novel Mýrin was made into a film, known internationally as Jar City, by Icelandic director Baltasar Kormákur.

Arnaldur's novels have sold over 20 million copies worldwide, in more than 40 languages, including Arabic, Russian, Polish, German, Greek, Danish, Catalan, English, Portuguese, Italian, Czech, Swedish, Norwegian, Dutch, Finnish, Macedonian, Spanish, Hungarian, Chinese, Croatian, Romanian, Bulgarian, French, Serbian, Slovenian and Turkish.

The 2023 film Operation Napoleon is based on Indriðason's novel of the same name.

== Awards ==
Arnaldur received the Glass Key award, a literature prize for the best Nordic crime novel, in 2002 and 2003. He won the Crime Writers' Association Gold Dagger Award in 2005 for his novel Silence of the Grave. He won the world's most lucrative crime fiction award, the RBA Prize for Crime Writing worth €125,000, in 2013 for Shadow Alley (Skuggasund). (Note: Incorrectly translated as Shadow Channel by Catalan News Agency in reference.)

== Bibliography ==
=== Detective Erlendur series ===
- Synir duftsins (Sons of The Dust), 1997 (Note: Not yet translated into English)
- Dauðarósir (Silent Kill), 1998
- Mýrin (Jar City), 2000. Trans. 2004
- Grafarþögn (Silence of the Grave), 2001. Trans. 2006
- Röddin (Voices), 2003. Trans. 2007
- Kleifarvatn (The Draining Lake), 2004. Trans. 2008
- Vetrarborgin (Arctic Chill), 2005. Trans. 2009
- Harðskafi (Hypothermia), 2007. Trans. 2010
- Myrká (Outrage), 2008. Trans. 2012
- Svörtuloft (Black Skies), 2009. Trans. 2013
- Furðustrandir (Strange Shores), 2010. Trans. 2014

==== Young Erlendur ====
- Einvígið (The Duel), 2011
- Reykjavíkurnætur (Reykjavik Nights), 2012. Trans. 2015
- Kamp Knox (Oblivion), 2014. Published in the U.S. as Into Oblivion, 2016

=== Reykjavik Wartime Mystery series (Flovent and Thorson) ===
- Skuggasund (The Shadow District), 2013. Trans. 2017
- Þýska húsið (The Shadow Killer), 2015. Trans. 2018
- Petsamo, 2016.

=== Konráð series ===
- Myrkrið veit (The Darkness Knows), 2017. Trans. 2021
- Stúlkan hjá brúnni (The Girl by the Bridge), 2018. Trans. 2023
- Tregasteinn (The Quiet Mother), 2019
- Þagnarmúr (Wall of Silence), 2020
- Kyrrþey (Peace), 2022
- Sæluríkið (The Kingdom of Bliss), 2023
- Tál (Seduction), 2025.

=== Other novels ===
- Napóleonsskjölin (Operation Napoleon), 1999. Trans. 2011
- Bettý, 2003
- Konungsbók, 2006
- Sigurverkið, 2021
- Ferðalok (Journey's End), 2024

=== Other writings ===
- Leyndardómar Reykjavíkur 2000 (one chapter; 2000)
- Reykjavík-Rotterdam (screenplay co-writer, 2008)

== See also ==
- List of Icelandic writers
- Icelandic literature
