= Bernard Scudder =

British translator

Bernard John Scudder (29 August 1954 – 15 October 2007) was a British translator from Icelandic into English. His translations include the work of best-selling crime writer Arnaldur Indriðason and Yrsa Sigurðardóttir. Scudder's translation of Arnaldur's novel Silence of the Grave won the 2005 Crime Writers' Association Gold Dagger.

In a 2014 article, Ann Cleeves listed Scudder's translation of Voices by Arnaldur Indriðason as one of the top 10 crime novels in translation.
