= List of Icelandic writers =

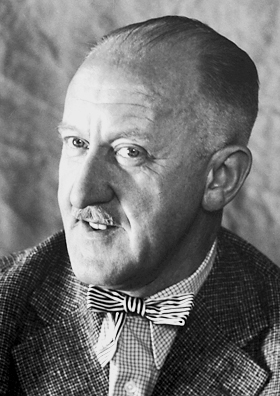
Halldór Kiljan Laxness, one of Iceland's most noted authors, was awarded the Nobel Prize in Literature in 1955

Iceland has a rich literary history, which has carried on into the modern period.

Some of the best known examples of Icelandic literature are the Sagas of Icelanders. These are prose narratives based on historical events that took place in Iceland and the surrounding areas during the Saga Age. Most of these sagas were recorded during the 13th and 14th centuries, but the original authors and subsequent recorders of the works are unknown and thus not listed here. Although it has been suggested that Snorri Sturluson is the author of Egil's Saga. The Saga tradition is not limited only to Iceland, and is an integral part of Norse mythology throughout the Nordics.

Another dominant form of Icelandic literature is poetry. Iceland has a rich history of poets, with many poets listed here. The early poetry of Iceland is Old Norse poetry, which is divided into the anonymous Eddic poetry, and the Skaldic poetry attributed to a series of skalds, who were court poets who lived in the Viking Age and Middle Ages. The modern Icelandic language is sufficiently similar to the Old Norse language for speakers of modern Icelandic to be able to understand Old Norse texts. Later Icelandic poetry includes the Passion Hymns by Hallgrímur Pétursson, a collection of Christian religious poetry published in 1666. Modern poets include Einar Benediktsson, a neo-Romantic poet who was an important figure in Iceland's nationalistic literary revival during the 19th century, and 20th-century poets such as Tómas Guðmundsson and Davíð Stefánsson.

Halldór Laxness is the only Icelander to have been awarded the Nobel Prize. Winner of the Nobel Prize in Literature in 1955, he is recognized as one of Iceland's greatest literary figures. He wrote poetry, newspaper articles, plays, travelogues, short stories, and novels. Icelandic authors have won the Nordic Council's Literature Prize nine times.

In the modern period many Icelandic authors have been successful writing in languages other than Icelandic. Others have their work translated into other languages and are known internationally. The Detective Erlendur series by crime fiction author Arnaldur Indriðason is translated into at least 24 languages, including English.

Following is a list of notable Icelandic writers. (Note: One in ten Icelanders is a published author, therefore to qualify for inclusion in the list, they must have an existing Wikipedia article as evidence of notability.) This list includes authors of Icelandic literature, as well as writers in other literary disciplines; such as authors of fiction and non-fiction works, poets and skalds, playwrights, screenwriters, songwriters and composers, scholars, scribes, journalists, (Note: Journalists should be known to write their own news articles to count as a writer.) translators, and editors of newspapers and magazines. All the people listed here are or were Icelandic citizens, or writers with a strong connection to Iceland, for example by writing in the Icelandic language. (Note: Writing in Icelandic is not on its own evidence of being Icelandic. Conversely, many Icelandic writers are known for their works in other languages.) People listed are from a wide range of time periods, ranging from the early Viking-age chroniclers, to modern day novelists. To help sort the writers by period, they are sorted according to the time period they lived. Although many more precise periods can be used, this list uses Contemporary for living writers, Modern for writers since the 16th century, and Medieval for the period from the 5th to the 15th century. In keeping with Icelandic naming conventions, the list is alphabetical by given name, as that is how Icelandic names are sorted.

== A ==
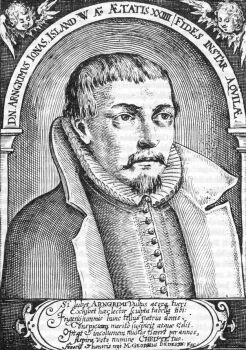
Arngrímur Jónsson the Learned, an Icelandic scholar who lived in the 16th and 17th centuries

Given names beginning with "A"
Name	Gender	Period	Born	Died	Genre/Type	Notable work	Citations
Andri Snær Magnason	Male	Contemporary	1973	Living	Children's book author	The Story of the Blue Planet	
Anna Mjöll Ólafsdóttir	Female	Contemporary	1970	Living	Jazz songwriter	Sjúbídú	
Anna Svanhildur Björnsdóttir	Female	Contemporary	1948	Living	Poet	Örugglega ég	
Ari Jósefsson	Male	Modern	1939	1964	Poet	Nei	
Ari Trausti Guðmundsson	Male	Contemporary	1948	Living	Non-fiction author	Vegalínur	
Ari Þorgilsson	Male	Medieval	1067	1148	Medieval chronicler	Íslendingabók	
Arnaldur Indriðason	Male	Contemporary	1961	Living	Crime fiction author	Detective Erlendur series	
Arndís Þórarinsdóttir	Female	Contemporary	1982	Living	Children's books author		
Arngrímr Brandsson	Male	Medieval	1325	1361	14th century author	Guðmundar saga D	
Arngrímur Jónsson	Male	Medieval	1568	1648	16th century scholar	Brevis commentarius de Islandia	
Arnórr Jarlaskáld	Male	Medieval	1012	1070	Skald		
Arnthor Birgisson	Male	Contemporary	1976	Living	Dance music songwriter		
Auður Ava Ólafsdóttir	Female	Contemporary	1958	Living	Novelist	Butterflies in November	
Auður Jónsdóttir	Female	Contemporary	1973	Living	Novelist	Secretaries to the Spirits	
Auður Laxness	Female	Modern	1918	2012	Author	Melkorka	

== Á ==
Given names beginning with "Á"
Name	Gender	Period	Born	Died	Genre/Type	Notable work	Citations
Álfrún Gunnlaugsdóttir	Female	Contemporary	1938	2021	Novelist	Þel	
Ágústína Jónsdóttir	Female	Contemporary	1949	Living	Poet	Að baki mánans	
Árni Bergmann	Male	Contemporary	1935	Living	Novelist	Thorvald the Widely-Travelled	
Árni Böðvarsson	Male	Modern	1924	1992	Dictionary editor		
Árni Lárentíusson	Male	Medieval	1304	1337	Medieval prose writer	Dunstanus saga	
Árni Þórarinsson	Male	Contemporary	1950	Living	Crime writer and journalist		
Áslaug Jónsdóttir	Female	Contemporary	1963	Living	Children's book author	Skrímsli í vanda	

== B ==
Given names beginning with "B"
Name	Gender	Period	Born	Died	Genre/Type	Notable work	Citations
Baldur Ragnarsson	Male	Contemporary	1930	2018	Poet		
Barði Jóhannsson	Male	Contemporary	1975	Living	Music writer		
Bergljót Arnalds	Female	Contemporary	1968	Living	Children's book author		
Bergr Sokkason	Male	Medieval	1316	1350	14th century scholar	Micheals Saga	
Bergþóra Árnadóttir	Female	Modern	1948	2007	Folk songwriter		
Bersi Skáldtorfuson	Male	Medieval	980	1030	11th century skald		
Birgir Sigurðsson	Male	Contemporary	1937	2019	Drama writer		
Birgitta Jónsdóttir	Female	Contemporary	1967	Living	Poet		
Birgitta Sif	Female	Contemporary	1981	Living	Children's book author		
Bjarki Karlsson	Male	Contemporary	1965	Living	Poet	Árleysi alda	
Bjarni Bjarnason	Male	Contemporary	1965	Living	Novelist	Endurkoma Maríu	
Bjarni Harðarson	Male	Contemporary	1961	Living	Novelist		
Bjarni Thorarensen	Male	Modern	1786	1841	Poet		
Björgvin Franz Gíslason	Male	Contemporary	1977	Living	Children's book author		
Björk Guðmundsdóttir	Female	Contemporary	1965	Living	Songwriter	Debut, Post, "Homogenic", Vulnicura, Fossora	
Björn Th. Björnsson	Male	Modern	1922	2007	Novelist		
Böðvar Guðmundsson	Male	Contemporary	1939	Living	Novelist		
Bogi Ágústsson	Male	Contemporary	1952	Living	Journalist		
Bragi Boddason	Male	Medieval	800	850	9th century poet	Ragnarsdrápa	
Bryndís Björgvinsdóttir	Female	Contemporary	1982	Living	Children's book author		
Brynhildur Þórarinsdóttir	Female	Contemporary	1970	Living	Children's book author		
Brynjar Leifsson	Male	Contemporary	1990	Living	Songwriter		
Brynjólfur Pétursson	Male	Modern	1810	1851	Magazine editor	Fjölnismenn	

== D ==
Given names beginning with "D"
Name	Gender	Period	Born	Died	Genre/Type	Notable work	Citations
Davíð Oddsson	Male	Contemporary	1948	2026	Newspaper editor	Editor of Morgunblaðið	
Davíð Stefánsson	Male	Modern	1895	1964	Poet		
Drífa Viðar	Female	Modern	1920	1971	Novelist	Fjalldalslilja	

== E ==
Given names beginning with "E"
Name	Gender	Period	Born	Died	Genre/Type	Notable work	Citations
Eggert Ólafsson	Male	Modern	1726	1768	Poet	Reise igiennem Island	
Egill Helgason	Male	Contemporary	1959	Living	Journalist		
Egill Skallagrímsson	Male	Medieval	904	995	Viking-Age poet	Höfuðlausn	
Eilífr Goðrúnarson	Male	Medieval	Unknown		10th-century skald	Þórsdrápa	
Eilífr kúlnasveinn	Male	Medieval	Unknown		12th or 13th century skald		
Einar Benediktsson	Male	Modern	1864	1940	Poet		
Einar Bragi	Male	Modern	1921	2005	Poet		
Einar Hjörleifsson Kvaran	Male	Modern	1859	1938	Newspaper editor, et al		
Einar Kárason	Male	Contemporary	1955	Living	Novelist		
Einar Már Guðmundson	Male	Contemporary	1954	Living	Novelist		
Einar Ragnarsson Kvaran	Male	Modern	1920	2012	Genealogist		
Einarr Gilsson	Male	Medieval	Unknown		14th century poet		
Einarr Hafliðason	Male	Medieval	1307	1393	14th century chronicler		
Einarr Helgason	Male	Medieval	Unknown		10th century skald		
Einarr Skúlason	Male	Medieval	1100	1159	12th century skald		
Eiríkur Bergmann	Male	Contemporary	1969	Living	Scholarly author & novelist	Samsærið	
Eiríkur Örn Norðdahl	Male	Contemporary	1978	Living	Poet	llska	
Eiríkur Rögnvaldsson	Male	Contemporary	1955	Living	Scholarly author		
Elín Briem	Female	Modern	1856	1937	Cookbook author		
Elín Ebba Gunnarsdóttir	Female	Contemporary	1953	Living	Short fiction author		
Elísabet Jökulsdóttir	Female	Contemporary	1958	Living	Journalist and poet		
Elsa G. Vilmundardóttir	Female	Modern	1932	2008	Non-fiction author		
Emil Thoroddsen	Male	Modern	1898	1944	Songwriter		
Erla Stefánsdóttir	Female	Contemporary	1935	2015	Seer		
Ernir Kristján Snorrason	Male	Modern	1944	2012	Novelist		
Eyjólfr Dáðaskáld	Male	Medieval	Unknown		Skald		
Eysteinn Ásgrímsson	Male	Medieval	1310	1360	Poet		
Eysteinn Björnsson	Male	Contemporary	1942	Living	Author		
Eysteinn Valdason	Male	Medieval	Unknown		10th century skald		
Eyvindur P. Eiríksson	Male	Contemporary	1935	Living	Poet		

== F ==
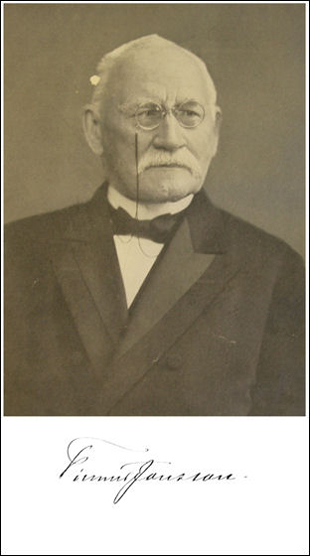
Finnur Jónsson

Given names beginning with "F"
Name	Gender	Period	Born	Died	Genre/Type	Notable work	Citations
Fríða Ísberg	Female	Contemporary	1992	Living	Novelist	Merking	
Finnur Jónsson	Male	Modern	1858	1934	Scholar	Historia Ecclesiastica Islandiæ	
Finnur Magnússon	Male	Modern	1781	1847	Scholarly author		
Fríða Á. Sigurðardóttir	Female	Modern	1940	2010	Novelist		

== G ==
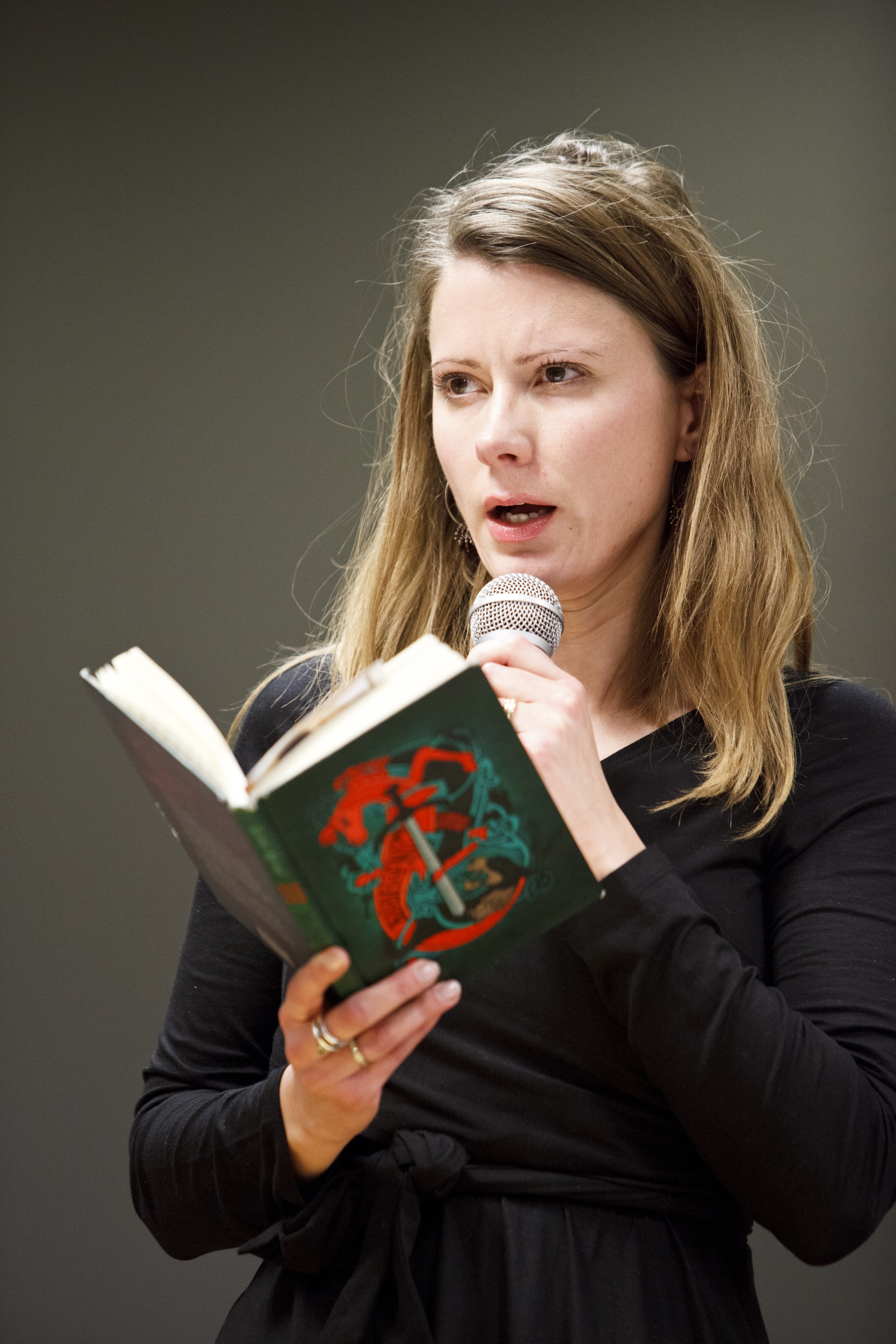
Poet and children's author Gerður Kristný

Given names beginning with "G"
Name	Gender	Period	Born	Died	Genre/Type	Notable work	Citations
Gamli Gnævaðarskáld	Male	Medieval	Unknown		Skald		
Gerður Kristný	Female	Contemporary	1970	Living	Poet		
Gísli Örn Garðarsson	Male	Contemporary	1973	Living	Screenwriter		
Gísli Rúnar Jónsson	Male	Contemporary	1953	2020	Screenwriter		
Glúmr Geirason	Male	Medieval	Unknown		10th century skald		
Gottskálk grimmi Nikulásson	Male	Medieval	1469	1520	Author of Rauðskinna		
Grímur Hákonarson	Male	Contemporary	1977	Living	Screenwriter		
Grímur Thomsen	Male	Modern	1820	1896	Poet		
Guðbergur Bergsson	Male	Contemporary	1932	2023	Author		
Guðmundur Andri Thorsson	Male	Contemporary	1957	Living	Novelist		
Guðmundur G. Hagalín	Male	Modern	1898	1985	Short story author		
Guðmundur Kamban	Male	Modern	1888	1945	Novelist		
Guðmundur Steingrímsson	Male	Contemporary	1972	Living			
Guðni Th. Jóhannesson	Male	Contemporary	1968	Living	Non-fiction writer		
Guðný Halldórsdóttir	Female	Contemporary	1954	Living	Screenwriter		
Guðrún Eva Mínervudóttir	Female	Contemporary	1976	Living	Novelist		
Guðrún frá Lundi	Female	Modern	1887	1975	Novelist		
Guðrún Helgadóttir	Female	Contemporary	1935	2022	Children's book author		
Guðrún Kristín Magnúsdóttir	Female	Contemporary	1939	Living	Author		
Guðrún Lárusdóttir	Female	Modern	1880	1938	Writer		
Gunnar Gunnarsson	Male	Modern	1889	1975	Novelist		
Gunnlaugr Leifsson	Male	Medieval	1190	1218	Poet		
Gunnlaugr Ormstunga	Male	Medieval	983	1008	Poet		
Gyrðir Elíasson	Male	Contemporary	1961	Living	Poet		

== H ==
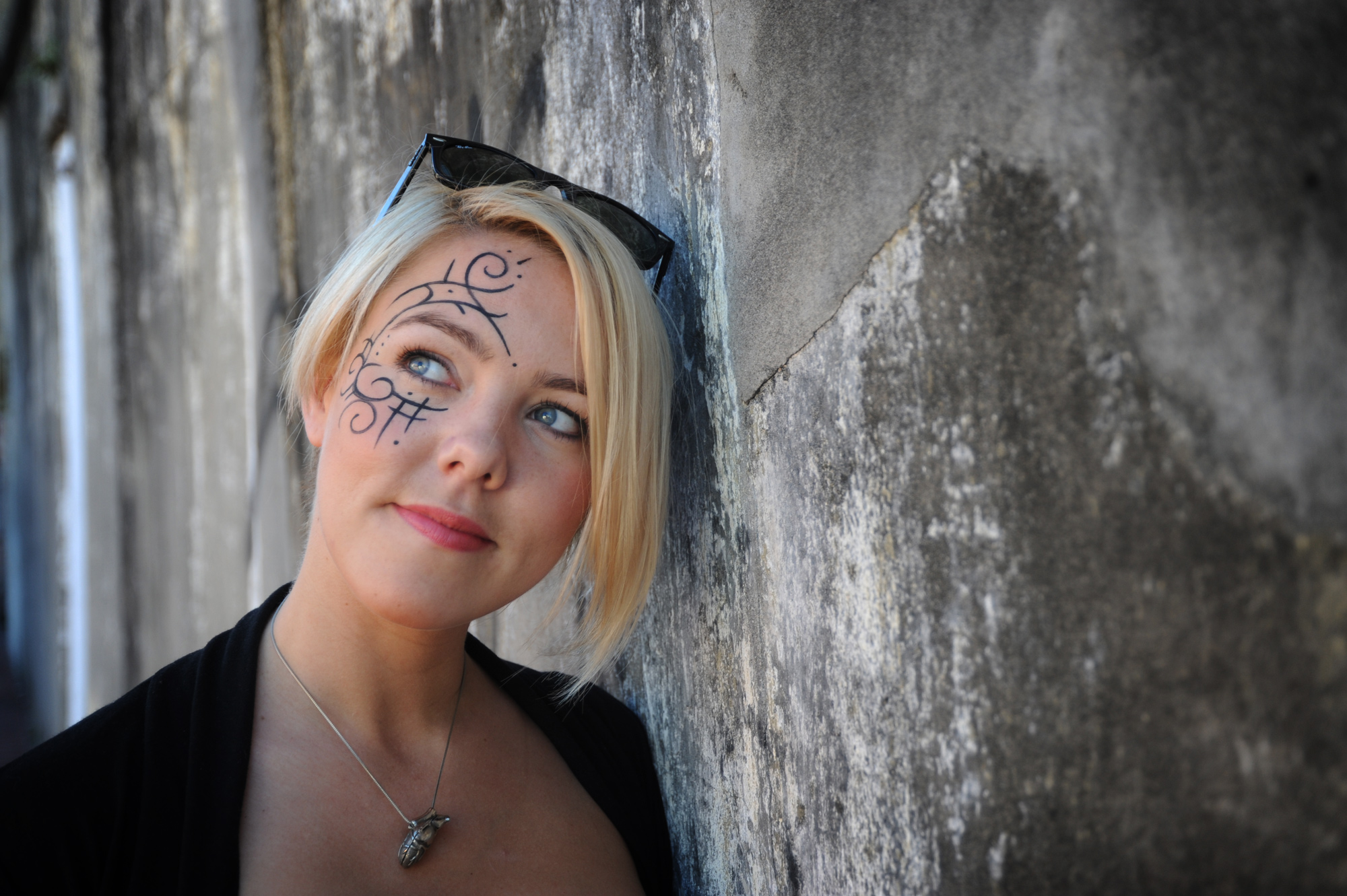
Hera Hjartardóttir

Given names beginning with "H"
Name	Gender	Period	Born	Died	Genre/Type	Notable work	Citations
Halla Gunnarsdóttir	Female	Contemporary	1981	Living	Journalist		
Hallar-Steinn	Male	Medieval	Unknown		13th century poet		
Halldór Guðmundsson	Male	Contemporary	1956	Living	Biographer		
Halldór Laxness	Male	Modern	1902	1998	Iceland's Nobel laureate		
Halldóra K. Thoroddsen	Male	Contemporary	1950	2020	Novelist		
Halldórr skvaldri	Male	Medieval	Unknown		Skald		
Hallfreðr vandræðaskáld	Male	Medieval	965	1007	Skald		
Hallgerður Gísladóttir	Female	Modern	1952	2007	Poet		
Hallgrímur Helgason	Male	Contemporary	1959	Living	Novelist		
Hallgrímur Pétursson	Male	Modern	1614	1674	Poet		
Hannes Hafstein	Male	Modern	1861	1922	Poet		
Hannes Pétursson	Male	Contemporary	1931	Living	Poet		
Hannes Sigfússon	Male	Modern	1922	1997	Poet		
Haukr Erlendsson	Male	Modern	1265	1334	Scholar		
Helgi Pjeturss	Female	Modern	1872	1949	Scientific writer		
Hera Hjartardóttir	Female	Contemporary	1983	Living	Songwriter		
Hermann Pálsson	Male	Modern	1921	2002	Scholar		
Hermann Stefánsson	Male	Contemporary	1968	Living	Author		
Hilmar Örn Hilmarsson	Male	Modern	1958	Living	Music writer		
Hitesh Ceon	Male	Contemporary	1974	Living	Songwriter		
Hjálmar Jónsson	Male	Modern	1796	1875	Poet		
Hrafnhildur Hagalín	Male	Contemporary	1965	Living	Playwright		
Hulda	Female	Modern	1881	1946	Poet		

== I ==
Given names beginning with "I"
Name	Gender	Period	Born	Died	Genre/Type	Notable work	Citations
Ilmur Kristjánsdóttir	Female	Contemporary	1978	Living	Screenwriter	Ástríður	
Indriði G. Þorsteinsson	Male	Modern	1926	2000	Novelist	79 af stöðinni	
Ingibjörg Haraldsdóttir	Female	Modern	1942	2016	Poet	Kona	
Ingólfur Margeirsson	Male	Modern	1948	2011	Newspaper editor	Lífsjátning	

== Í ==
Given names beginning with "Í"
Name	Gender	Period	Born	Died	Genre/Type	Notable work	Citations
Íeda Herman	Male	Contemporary	1925	2019	Author	Viking Kids Don't Cry	
Ísak Harðarson	Male	Contemporary	1956	2023	Poet		

== J ==
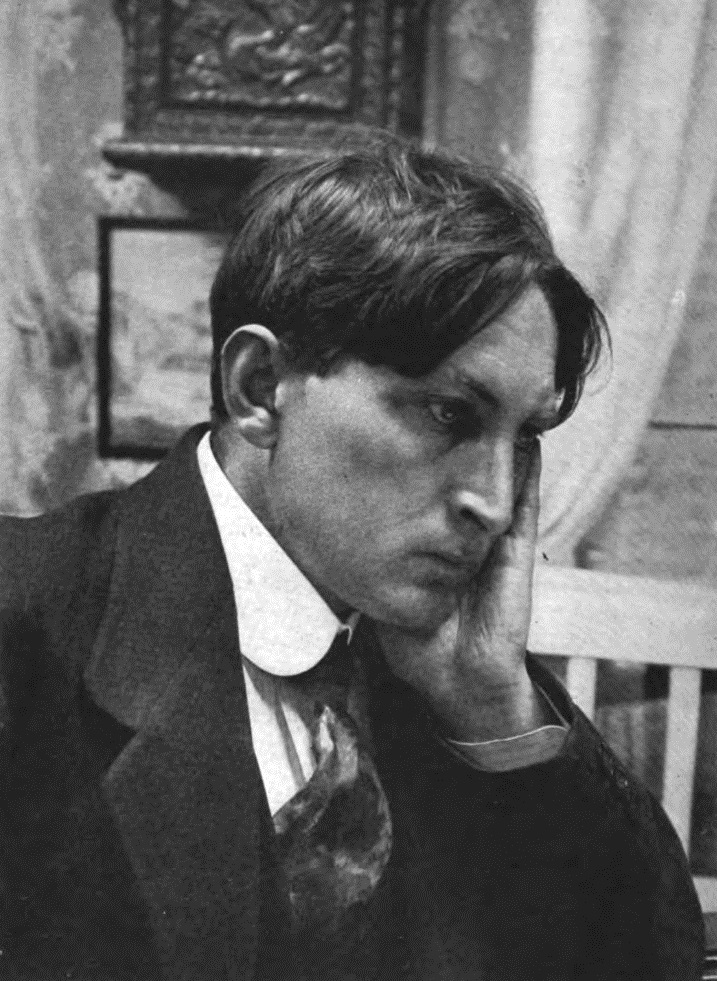
Playwright and poet Jóhann Sigurjónsson

Given names beginning with "J"
Name	Gender	Period	Born	Died	Genre/Type	Notable work	Citations
Jakobína Sigurðardóttir	Female	Modern	1918	1994	Modernist writer		
Jófríður Ákadóttir	Female	Contemporary	1994	Living	Songwriter		
Jóhann Gunnar Sigurðsson	Male	Modern	1882	1906	Poet		
Jóhann Sigurjónsson	Male	Modern	1880	1919	Poet		
Jóhannes úr Kötlum	Male	Modern	1899	1972	Poet		
Jón Árnason	Male	Modern	1819	1888	Folklorist		
Jón Atli Jónasson	Male	Contemporary	1972	Living	Playwright		
Jón Helgason	Male	Modern	1899	1986	Poet		
Jón Hnefill Aðalsteinsson	Male	Modern	1927	2010	Folklorist		
Jón Kalman Stefánsson	Male	Contemporary	1963	Living	Novelist		
Jón lærði Guðmundsson	Male	Modern	1574	1651	Sorcerer and poet		
Jón Leifs	Male	Modern	1899	1968	Music writer		
Jón Magnússon	Male	Modern	1610	1696	Author of the Píslarsaga		
Jón Oddsson Hjaltalín	Male	Modern	1749	1835	Religious writer		
Jón Ólafsson	Male	Modern	1850	1916	Journalist		
Jón Ólafsson (Note: The traveller)	Male	Modern	1594	1679	Explorer and autobiographer		
Jón Örn Loðmfjörð	Male	Contemporary	1983	Living	Experimental poet		
Jón Óskar	Male	Modern	1921	1998	Poet		
Jón frá Pálmholti	Male	Modern	1930	2004	Poet		
Jón Sveinsson	Male	Modern	1857	1944	Children's book writer		
Jón Thoroddsen elder	Male	Modern	1818	1868	Poet and novelist		
Jón Thoroddsen junior	Male	Modern	1898	1924	Author		
Jón Trausti Sigurðarson	Male	Contemporary	1982	Living	Newspaper editor		
Jón úr Vör	Male	Modern	1917	2000	Poet		
Jónas Hallgrímsson	Male	Modern	1807	1845	Magazine editor		
Jónas Kristjánsson	Male	Modern	1924	2014	Novelist		
Jónína Leósdóttir	Female	Contemporary	1954	Living	Author		
Jórunn skáldmær	Female	Medieval	Unknown		10th century skald		

== K ==
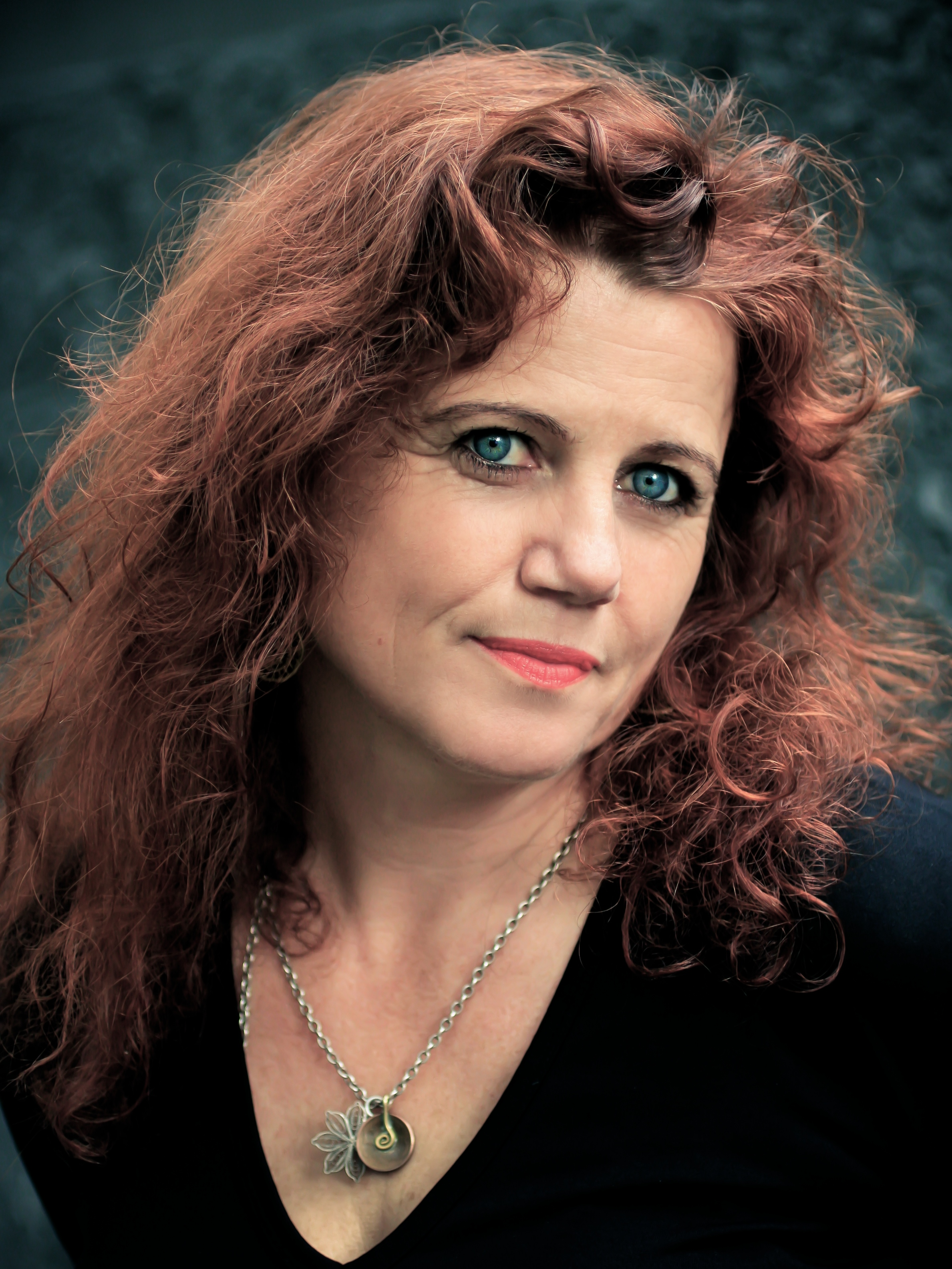
Children's writer Kristín Helga Gunnarsdóttir

Given names beginning with "K"
Name	Gender	Period	Born	Died	Genre/Type	Notable work	Citations
Karl Jónsson	Male	Medieval	1135	1213	Poet		
Kolbeinn Tumason	Male	Medieval	1173	1207	Poet		
Konráð Gíslason	Male	Modern	1808	1891	Grammarian		
Kormákr Ögmundarson	Male	Medieval	Unknown		10th century skald		
Kristín Eiríksdóttir	Female	Contemporary	1981	Living	Poet		
Kristín Helga Gunnarsdóttir	Female	Contemporary	1963	Living	Children's book writer		
Kristín Marja Baldursdóttir	Female	Contemporary	1949	Living	Novelist		
Kristín Ómarsdóttir	Female	Contemporary	1962	Living	Author		
Kristín Steinsdóttir	Female	Contemporary	1946	Living	Children's book writer		
Kristinn Ármannsson	Male	Modern	1895	1966	Author of Latin Grammar		
Kristinn Hrafnsson	Male	Contemporary	1962	Living	Investigative journalist		
Kristján B. Jónasson	Male	Contemporary	1967	Living	Biographer		
Kristján Karlsson	Male	Modern	1922	2014	Poet		
Kristjan Niels Julius	Male	Modern	1860	1936	Poet		
Kristmann Guðmundsson	Male	Modern	1901	1983	Novelist		

== L ==
Given names beginning with "L"
Name	Gender	Period	Born	Died	Genre/Type	Notable work	Citations
Lilja Sigurðardóttir	Female	Contemporary	1972	Living	Crime fiction writer	Snare	
Linda Vilhjálmsdóttir	Female	Contemporary	1958	Living	Poet		

== M ==
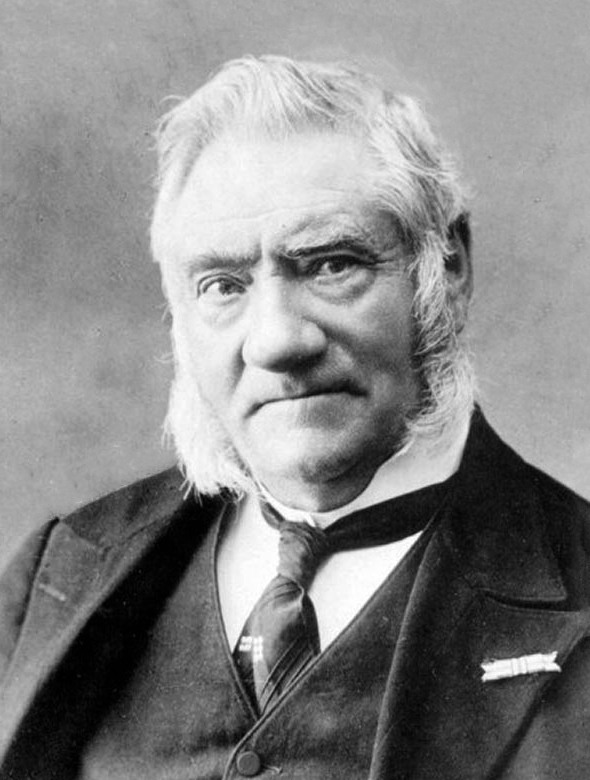
Poet Matthías Jochumsson

Given names beginning with "M"
Name	Gender	Period	Born	Died	Genre/Type	Notable work	Citations
Magnús Eiríksson	Male	Modern	1806	1881	Theologian		
Magnús Jónsson	Male	Modern	1530	1591	Poet		
Magnús Jónsson í Tjaldanesi	Male	Modern	1835	1922	Scribe		
Magnús Kjartansson	Male	Modern	1919	1981	Newspaper editor		
Magnus Magnusson	Male	Modern	1929	2007	Journalist		
Magnús Þór Jónsson	Male	Contemporary	1945	Living	Songwriter		
María Lilja Þrastardóttir	Female	Contemporary	1986	Living	Author		
Marta María Stephensen	Male	Modern	1770	1805	Pioneering author		
Matthías Jochumsson	Male	Modern	1835	1920	Author of Lofsöngur		
Mikael Torfason	Male	Contemporary	1974	Living	Novelist	Syndafallið	

== N ==
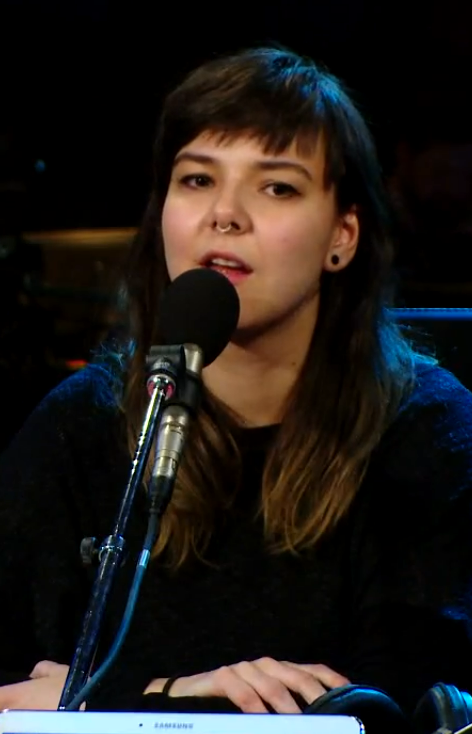
Nanna Bryndís Hilmarsdóttir

Given names beginning with "N"
Name	Gender	Period	Born	Died	Genre/Type	Notable work	Citations
Nanna Bryndís Hilmarsdóttir	Female	Contemporary	1989	Living	Songwriter		
Nína Björk Árnadóttir	Female	Modern	1941	2000	Novelist		

== O ==
Given names beginning with "O"
Name	Gender	Period	Born	Died	Genre/Type	Notable work	Citations
Oddný Eir	Female	Contemporary	1972	Living	Autobiographer		
Oddr Snorrason	Male	Medieval	Unknown		Medieval chronicler	The Saga of Olaf Tryggvason	
Olvir Hnufa	Male	Medieval	Unknown		Skald		

== Ó ==
Given names beginning with "Ó"
Name	Gender	Period	Born	Died	Genre/Type	Notable work	Citations
Ófeigur Sigurðsson	Male	Contemporary	1975	Living	Poet		
Óláfr Leggsson	Male	Medieval	Unknown		13th century skald		
Óláfr Þórðarson	Male	Medieval	1210	1259	Skald	Third Grammatical Treatise	
Ólafur Egilsson	Male	Modern	1564	1639	Autobiographer	Reisubók séra Ólafs Egilssonar	
Ólafur Gunnarsson	Male	Contemporary	1948	Living	Author		
Ólafur Haukur Símonarson	Male	Contemporary	1947	Living	Playwright		
Ólafur Jóhann Ólafsson	Male	Contemporary	1962	Living	Novelist		
Ólafur Jóhann Sigurðsson	Male	Contemporary	1918	1988	Novelist		
Ólafur Jóhannesson	Male	Contemporary	1975	Living	Screenwriter		
Ólína Þorvarðardóttir	Female	Contemporary	1958	Living	Scholar		
Óskar Halldórsson	Male	Modern	1921	1983	Scholar		
Óskar Jónasson	Male	Contemporary	1963	Living	Screenwriter		
Óttar M. Norðfjörð	Male	Contemporary	1980	Living	Crime fiction writer		
Óttarr svarti	Male	Medieval	Unknown		11th century skald		

== Ö ==
Given names beginning with "Ö"
Name	Gender	Period	Born	Died	Genre/Type	Notable work	Citations
Örn Árnason	Male	Contemporary	1959	Living	Screenwriter		
Örvar Þóreyjarson Smárason	Male	Contemporary	1977	Living	Poet		

== P ==
Given names beginning with "P"
Name	Gender	Period	Born	Died	Genre/Type	Notable work	Citations
Páll Ólafsson	Male	Modern	1827	1905	Poet		
Paul Oscar	Male	Contemporary	1970	Living	Songwriter	Minn hinsti dans	
Pétur Gunnarsson	Male	Contemporary	1947	Living	Author		
Pétur Þorsteinsson	Male	Contemporary	1955	Living	Dictionary editor	Pétrísk-Íslensk Orðabók	

== R ==
Given names beginning with "R"
Name	Gender	Period	Born	Died	Genre/Type	Notable work	Citations
Ragna Sigurðardóttir	Female	Contemporary	1962	Living	Author	Borg (City)	
Ragnar Jónasson	Male	Contemporary	1976	Living	Crime writer	Dark Iceland series	
Ragnar Þórhallsson	Male	Contemporary	1987	Living	Songwriter		
Ragnheiður Gestsdóttir	Female	Contemporary	1953	Living	Children's author		
Róbert Ingi Douglas	Male	Contemporary	1973	Living	Screenwriter		
Rósa Guðmundsdóttir	Female	Modern	1795	1855	Poet		
Rúnar Rúnarsson	Male	Contemporary	1977	Living	Screenwriter		

== S ==
Given names beginning with "S"
Name	Gender	Period	Born	Died	Genre/Type	Notable work	Citations
Sæmundr fróði	Male	Medieval	1056	1133	11th century scholar		
Sigfús Daðason	Male	Modern	1928	1996	Poet		
Sighvatr Sturluson	Male	Medieval	1170	1238	Poet		
Sigrún Davíðsdóttir	Female	Contemporary	1955	Living	Journalist		
Sigrún Edda Björnsdóttir	Female	Contemporary	1958	Living	Author		
Sigurbjörg Þrastardóttir	Female	Contemporary	1973	Living	Poet		
Sigurður Breiðfjörð	Male	Modern	1798	1846	Poet		
Sigurður Nordal	Male	Modern	1886	1974	Scholar		
Sigurður Pálsson	Male	Modern	1948	2017	Poet		
Sigurður Sigurjónsson	Male	Contemporary	1955	Living	Screenwriter		
Sigurlaug Gísladóttir	Female	Contemporary	1984	Living	Songwriter		
Sigurlaugur Elíasson	Male	Contemporary	1957	Living	Poet		
Sigvatr Þórðarson	Male	Medieval	995	1045	Skald		
Sindri Freysson	Male	Contemporary	1970	Living	Novelist		
Sindri Sindrason	Male	Contemporary	Unknown		Journalist		
Sigurjón Birgir Sigurðsson	Male	Contemporary	1962	Living	Poet		
Skapti Þóroddsson	Male	Medieval	?	1030	Skald		
Skúli Þórsteinsson	Male	Medieval	Unknown		Poet		
Snorri Hergill Kristjánsson	Male	Contemporary	1974	Living	Author		
Snorri Hjartarson	Male	Modern	1906	1986	Poet		
Snorri Sturluson	Male	Medieval	1179	1241	Poet		
Sóley Stefánsdóttir	Female	Contemporary	1986	Living	Songwriter		
Sólveig Anspach	Male	Modern	1960	2015	Screenwriter		
Sölvi Fannar	Male	Contemporary	1971	Living			
Stefán Einarsson	Male	Modern	1897	1972	Literary historian		
Stefán frá Hvítadal	Male	Modern	1887	1933	Poet		
Stefán Hörður Grímsson	Male	Modern	1919	2002	Poet		
Stefán Jón Hafstein	Male	Contemporary	1955	Living	Author		
Stefán Sigurðsson	Male	Modern	1887	1933	Poet		
Steinar Bragi	Male	Contemporary	1975	Living	Author		
Steingrímur Thorsteinsson	Male	Modern	1831	1913	Translator		
Steinn Steinarr	Male	Modern	1908	1958	Poet		
Steinunn Finnsdóttir	Female	Modern	1640	1710	Poet		
Steinunn Refsdóttir	Female	Medieval	Unknown		10th century skald		
Steinunn Sigurðardóttir	Female	Contemporary	1950	Living	Novelist		
Steinvör Sighvatsdóttir	Female	Medieval	1210	1271	Poet		
Stefán Guðmundur Guðmundsson	Male	Modern	1853	1927	Poet		
Sturla Þórðarson	Male	Medieval	1214	1284	Skald		
Svala Björgvinsdóttir	Female	Contemporary	1977	Living	Songwriter		
Svava Jakobsdóttir	Female	Modern	1930	2004	Author		
Svavar Knútur Kristinsson	Male	Medieval	Unknown		Songwriter		
Sveinbjörn Egilsson	Male	Modern	1791	1852	Theologian		

== T ==
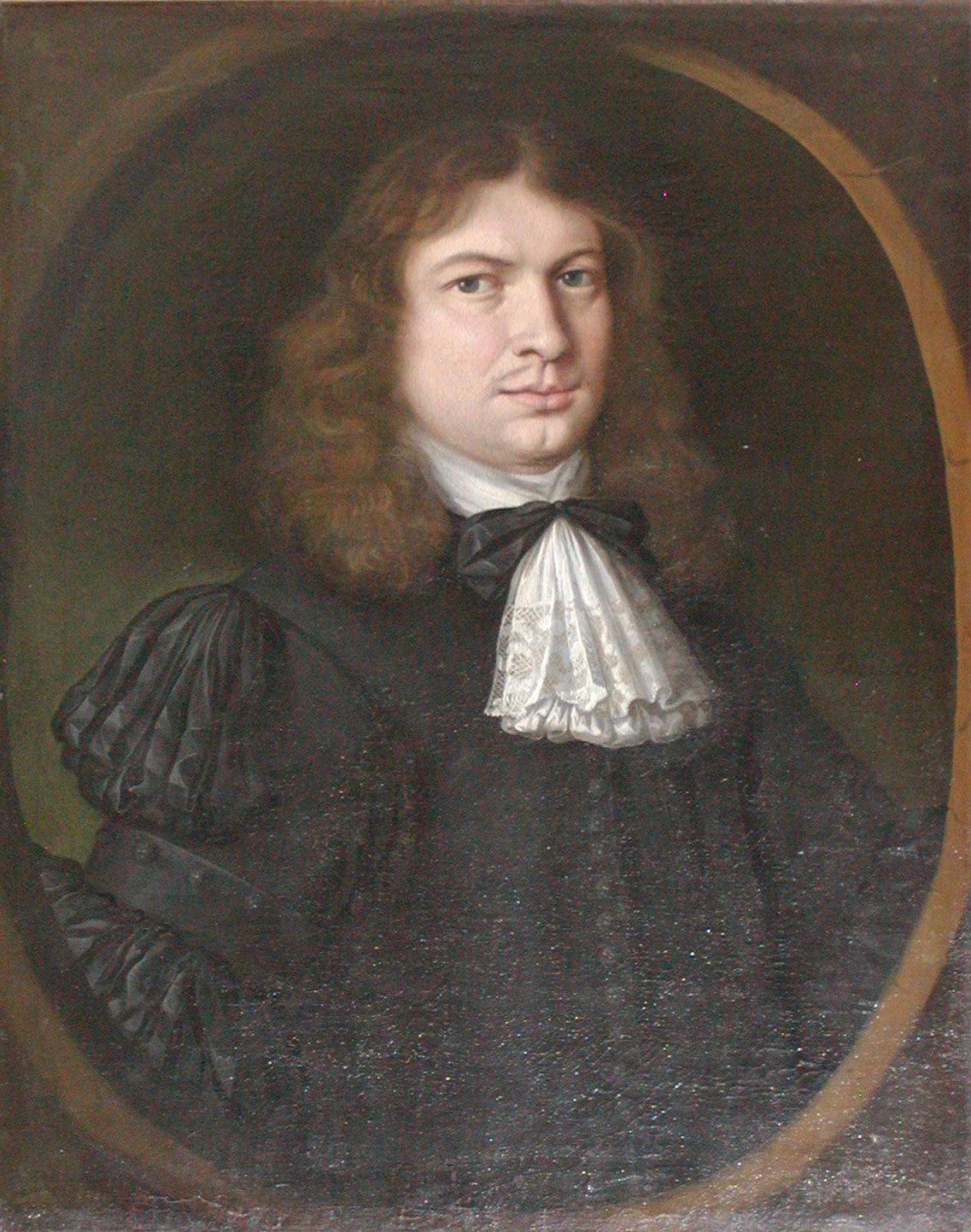
Icelandic historian Thormodus Torfæus

Given names beginning with "T"
Name	Gender	Period	Born	Died	Genre/Type	Notable work	Citations
Thor Vilhjálmsson	Male	Modern	1925	2011	Writer		
Thorarinn Leifsson	Male	Contemporary	1966	Living	Author		
Thordis Elva	Male	Contemporary	1980	Living	Autobiographer		
Thormodus Torfæus	Male	Modern	1636	1719	Historian		
Tindr Hallkelsson	Male	Medieval	Unknown		10th century skald		
Tómas Guðmundsson	Male	Modern	1901	1983	Poet		
Tómas Sæmundsson	Male	Modern	1807	1841	Fjölnismenn		
Tony Jonsson	Male	Modern	1921	2001	Autobiographer		
Torfhildur Þorsteinsdóttir	Female	Modern	1845	1918	Iceland's first woman novelist		
Tyrfingur Tyrfingsson	Male	Contemporary	1987	Living	Playwright		

== Þ ==
Given names beginning with "Þ"
Name	Gender	Period	Born	Died	Genre/Type	Notable work	Citations
Þjóðólfr Arnórsson	Male	Medieval	1010	1066	11th century skald		
Þór Whitehead	Male	Contemporary	1943	Living	Historian		
Þórarinn Eldjárn	Male	Contemporary	1949	Living	Author		
Þórarinn loftunga	Male	Medieval	Unknown		11th century skald		
Þórarinn Skeggjason	Male	Medieval	Unknown		11th century skald		
Þórbergur Þórðarson	Male	Modern	1889	1974	Author		
Þorbjörn dísarskáld	Male	Medieval	Unknown		11th century skald		
Þórdís Gísladóttir	Female	Contemporary	1965	Living	Children's book author		
Þórðr Kolbeinsson	Male	Medieval	Unknown		11th century skald		
Þórðr Sjáreksson	Male	Medieval	Unknown		11th century skald		
Þórður Helgason	Male	Contemporary	1947	Living	Author		
Þorgils gjallandi	Male	Modern	1851	1915	Author		
Þorgrímur Þráinsson	Male	Contemporary	1959	Living	Writer		
Þórhildur Sunna Ævarsdóttir	Female	Contemporary	1987	Living	Journalist		
Þórir Jökull Steinfinnsson	Male	Medieval	?	1238	Skald		
Þorleifr jarlsskáld	Male	Medieval	Unknown		Skald		
Þorleifur Repp	Male	Modern	1794	1857	Newspaper editor		
Þorsteinn Erlingsson	Male	Modern	1858	1914	Poet		
Þorsteinn frá Hamri	Male	Modern	1938	2018	Poet		
Þorsteinn Gylfason	Male	Modern	1942	2005	Philosopher		
Þórunn Elfa Magnúsdóttir	Female	Modern	1910	1995	Novelist		
Þórunn Erna Clausen	Male	Contemporary	1975	Living	Songwriter		
Þórvaldr Hjaltason	Male	Medieval	Unknown		Skald		
Þorvaldr veili	Male	Medieval	Unknown		10th century skald		
Þráinn Bertelsson	Male	Contemporary	1944	Living	Author		

== U ==
Given names beginning with "U"
Name	Gender	Period	Born	Died	Genre/Type	Notable work	Citations
Úlfr Uggason	Male	Medieval	Unknown		10th century skald	Húsdrápa	
Unnar Gísli Sigurmundsson	Male	Contemporary	Unknown		Songwriter	Color Decay	

== V ==
Given names beginning with "V"
Name	Gender	Period	Born	Died	Genre/Type	Notable work	Citations
Valgerður Þóroddsdóttir	Female	Contemporary	1989	Living	Author		
Vetrliði Sumarliðason	Male	Medieval	Unknown		10th century skald		
Vigdís Grímsdóttir	Female	Contemporary	1953	Living	Poet		
Vigfúss Víga-Glúmsson	Male	Medieval	Unknown		Skald		
Viktor Arnar Ingólfsson	Male	Contemporary	1955	Living	Crime fiction writer	Afturelding	
Vilborg Dagbjartsdóttir	Female	Contemporary	1930	2021	Poet		
Vilborg Davíðsdóttir	Female	Contemporary	1965	Living	Novelist		
Vilmundur Gylfason	Male	Modern	1948	1983	Poet		
Völu-Steinn	Male	Medieval	Unknown		Skald		

== Y ==
Given names beginning with "Y"
Name	Gender	Period	Born	Died	Genre/Type	Notable work	Citations
Yrsa Sigurðardóttir	Female	Contemporary	1963	Living	Crime fiction writer	Biobörn	
Yvonne K. Fulbright	Female	Contemporary	?	Living	Sexologist		

== See also ==
- List of Icelandic women writers
- Icelandic literature
- Culture of Iceland
- Icelandic language
- Sagas of Icelanders
