= List of Icelandic women writers =

This is a list of women writers who were born in Iceland or whose writings are closely associated with that country.

== A ==
- Anna Mjöll Ólafsdóttir, jazz songwriter
- Anna Svanhildur Björnsdóttir, poet
- Arndís Þórarinsdóttir, children's books author
- Auður Ava Ólafsdóttir (born 1958), novelist, poet
- Auður Jónsdóttir (born 1973), novelist, playwright, journalist
- Auður Laxness, writer and wife of Halldór Laxness

== Á ==
- Álfrún Gunnlaugsdóttir (1938–2021), novelist
- Áslaug Jónsdóttir, children's book author
- Ágústína Jónsdóttir (born 1949), poet

== B ==
- Bergljót Arnalds, children's book author
- Bergþóra Árnadóttir, folk song writer
- Birgitta Jónsdóttir (born 1967), politician, poet, editor
- Björk, songwriter
- Bryndís Björgvinsdóttir (born 1982), novelist
- Brynhildur Þórarinsdóttir (born 1970), children's writer

== D ==
- Drífa Viðar (1920–1971), writer, artist and educator

== E ==
- Elín Briem (1856–1937), teacher, cookbook writer
- Elín Ebba Gunnarsdóttir (born 1953), short story writer
- Elísabet Jökulsdóttir (born 1958), poet, short story writer, playwright, journalist
- Elsa G. Vilmundardóttir (1932–2008), Iceland's first female geologist
- Erla Stefánsdóttir (1935–2015), writes on elf habitats in Iceland

== F ==
- Fríða Ísberg (born 1992), novelist, short story writer and poet
- Fríða Á. Sigurðardóttir (1940–2010), novelist, short story writer

== G ==
- Gerður Kristný (born 1970), poet, short story writer, novelist, children's writer
- Guðný Halldórsdóttir (born 1954), film director, screenwriter
- Guðrún Eva Mínervudóttir (born 1976), acclaimed novelist
- Guðrún frá Lundi (1887–1975), novelist
- Guðrún Helgadóttir (1935–2022), children's writer, playwright
- Guðrún Kristín Magnúsdóttir (born 1939), author
- Guðrún Lárusdóttir (1880–1938), writer

== H ==
- Halldóra Bjarnadóttir (1873–1981), books for children and textile artists
- Hallfríður Ólafsdóttir (1964–2020), children's author
- Hallgerður Gísladóttir (1952 – 2007), ethnologist, writings on Icelandic food, poet
- Hallgerður Gísladóttir (1952 – 2007), poet
- Helgi Pjeturss (1872 – 1949), scientific writer
- Hera Hjartardóttir (born 1983), songwriter
- Hulda, pen name of Unnur Benediktsdóttir Bjarklind, poet, short story writer, novelist

== I ==
- Íeda Jónasdóttir Herman (c. 1918–2019), author and adventurer
- Ingibjörg Haraldsdóttir (1942–2016), poet, translator

== J ==
- Jónína Leósdóttir (born 1954), novelist, playwright, journalist
- Jórunn skáldmær 10th century skald
- Jófríður Ákadóttir (born 1994) songwriter
- Jakobína Sigurðardóttir (1918–1994), writer

== K ==
- Kristín Eiríksdóttir (born 1981), poet and writer
- Kristín Helga Gunnarsdóttir (born 1963), children's writer, journalist
- Kristín Marja Baldursdóttir (born 1949), novelist, playwright
- Kristín Ómarsdóttir (born 1962), poet, playwright, novelist
- Kristín Ragna Gunnarsdóttir (born 1968), children's book writer and illustrator
- Kristín Steinsdóttir (born 1946), children's writer, playwright

== L ==
- Lilja Sigurdardottir (born 1972), crime-fiction novelist, playwright, screenwriter
- Linda Vilhjálmsdóttir (born 1958), poet, playwright

== M ==
- María Lilja Þrastardóttir (born 1986) author

== N ==
- Nína Björk Árnadóttir (1941–2000), playwright, poet, novelist
- Nanna Bryndís Hilmarsdóttir (born 1989), songwriter

== O ==
- Oddný Eir (born 1972), autobiographical novelist, publisher

== Ó ==
- Ólína Þorvarðardóttir (born 1958), politician, journalist, non-fiction writer

== R ==
- Ragna Sigurðardóttir (born 1962), short story writer, poet, translator
- Ragnheiður Gestsdóttir (born 1953), children's writer, novelist
- Rósa Guðmundsdóttir (1795–1855), poet, writer of ballads and folk tales

== S ==
- Steinunn Finnsdóttir (c.1640 – c.1710), poet
- Steinunn Refsdóttir (10th century), pre-Christian poet
- Steinunn Sigurðardóttir (born 1950), poet, novelist, journalist
- Svava Jakobsdóttir (1930–2004), feminist politician, leading novelist, short story writer, poet, playwright
- Sigrún Davíðsdóttir (born 1955), Journalist
- Sigrún Edda Björnsdóttir (born 1958), author
- Sigurbjörg Þrastardóttir (born 1973), poet
- Sigurlaug Gísladóttir (born 1984), songwriter
- Sóley Stefánsdóttir (born 1986), songwriter
- Steinvör Sighvatsdóttir (1210–1271), poet
- Svala Björgvinsdóttir (born 1977), songwriter

== T ==
- Þórdís Gísladóttir (born 1965), children's writer, poet, translator
- Þórunn Elfa Magnúsdóttir (1910–1995), novelist
- Þórhildur Sunna Ævarsdóttir (born 1987), journalist
- Torfhildur Þorsteinsdóttir (1845–1918), first Icelandic woman novelist, short story writer, writer of folk tales

== V ==
- Valgerður Þóroddsdóttir (born 1989), author
- Vigdís Grímsdóttir (born 1953), poet, short story writer, novelist, children's writer
- Vilborg Dagbjartsdóttir (1930–2021), modernist poet, feminist, children's writer, translator
- Vilborg Davíðsdóttir (born 1965), novelist, journalist

== Y ==
- Yrsa Sigurðardóttir (born 1963), internationally successful crime-fiction novelist, children's writer
- Yvonne K. Fulbright, Icelandic-American sexologist, writings on sex and sex education since 2003

== See also ==
- List of Icelandic writers
- List of women writers
