= Þórunn Magnúsdóttir =

Þórunn or Thorunn Magnúsdóttir may refer to:

- Þórunn Elfa Magnúsdóttir (1910-1965), Icelandic writer
- Thorunn Magnúsdóttir (musician), member of the band Fields
- Þórunn Magnea Magnúsdóttir, actor in Jar City (film)
