= Árni Böðvarsson =

Icelandic educator, grammarian and dictionary editor

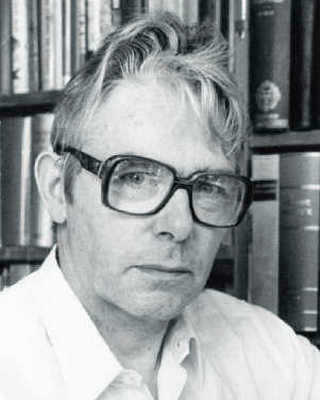
Árni Böðvarsson

Árni Böðvarsson (May 15, 1924 – September 1, 1992) was an Icelandic educator, grammarian, and dictionary editor. He edited the first standard dictionary of Icelandic, co-edited a Russian-Icelandic dictionary, and was also an Esperantist, editor of an Icelandic-Esperanto dictionary, a long-time member of the Universal Esperanto Association (UEA), co-founder of the Reykjavík Esperanto society, and secretary of the Icelandic Esperanto Association.

== Life and career ==
Árni was born at Hvolreppur in Rangárvallasýsla, one of five children. He was largely privately educated, took his school-leaving examination at Menntaskólinn í Reykjavík in 1945, and then studied at the University of Iceland, where he earned a cand.mag. in Icelandic studies in 1950 and a teaching qualification in 1953. From 1955 to 1957 he was a visiting instructor in Icelandic at the Universities of Bergen and Oslo, while also studying the history of Norwegian and Norwegian dialectology. In 1980 he completed a degree in child language acquisition and Bulgarian at the University of Uppsala.

He taught at many schools and colleges, including the Iceland University of Education, the Icelandic College of Domestic Science, the University of Iceland (from 1968 to 1987), and Hamrahlið College, where he taught from 1968 to 1984 and was also head librarian from 1970. He also worked for many years for the national broadcaster, RÚV, producing a segment titled Daglegt mál (Daily Word) for several years, acting as its first language consultant from 1984, and editing the in-house publication on language, Tungutaks.

He published a number of textbooks on linguistics and Icelandic usage and was editor-in-chief and compiler of the first standard dictionary of Icelandic, Íslenzk orðabók handa skólum og almenningi (Icelandic Dictionary for Schools and the Public), which was drawn up in 1957–63 and published in 1963 by the Icelandic Cultural Fund; he also oversaw its revision and co-edited the second edition, published in 1983, with Asgeir Bl. Magnusson.

Árni oversaw publication with Bjarni Vilhjálmsson of the 1954–61 edition in six volumes of the Íslenzkar Þjóðsögur og Æfintýri collected by Jón Árnason. He was a co-contributor to the Icelandic-Russian dictionary published in Moscow in 1962, and also worked on the supplement to Sigfús Blöndal's Íslenzk-danska orðabók (Icelandic-Danish Dictionary) published in 1963.

He was also active in a number of associations. He was president of the Félag íslenskra fræða (Association of Icelandic Studies) from 1957 to 1962, secretary of the Icelandic Union of Academics from 1960 to 1964 and served on the boards of various other associations, including the Félag leiðsögumanna (Association of Guides), the Samtök mígrenisjúklinga (Organization of Migraineurs), and Menningartengsl Íslands og Ráðstjórnarríkjanna (Cultural Relations Iceland-USSR).

== Esperanto ==
Árni was a member of the Universal Esperanto Association for several decades and a delegate specializing in linguistics. He co-founded the Reykjavík Esperanto society, Aŭroro and served as secretary of the Icelandic Esperanto Association. He edited the 1965 Íslenzk-Esperanto orđabók / Islanda-Esperanta vortaro (Icelandic-Esperanto Dictionary) compiled by Baldvin B. Skaftfell and wrote a pamphlet in Esperanto on Icelandic grammar. He was a member of the Local Congress Committee for the 62nd World Esperanto Congress held in Reykjavík in 1977 and, for many years, a member of the commission for the Belartaj Konkursoj, the UEA's literary competitions.

== Personal life and death ==
Árni was married to Ágústa Árnadóttur and had two children and a foster-child. He died at home in Reykjavík.

== See also ==
- List of Icelandic writers
