= Fannar =

Fannar may refer to:

- Fannar Ólafsson
- Andri Fannar Baldursson
- Sölvi Fannar
- Valur Gíslason (middle name)
