= Anna Svanhildur Björnsdóttir =

Icelandic writer and educator

Anna Svanhildur Björnsdóttir (born 30 November 1948) is an Icelandic writer and educator.

She was born in Reykjavík and grew up there. She earned a teaching diploma in 1969 and moved to Hólmavík. Anna Svanhildur had two sons with her first husband. The couple later divorced; she moved to Snæfellsnes and then returned to Reykjavík. She married Einar Aðalsteinsson and had two more children with him; he died in 1998. She also taught in Húsavík.

In 1985, she began publishing poetry in various publications. Björnsdóttir published her first book of poetry Örugglega ég ("Definitely Me") in 1988. Her 2003 collection Mens solen stadig er fremme / Meðan sól er enn á lofti ("While the Sun is Still Up") appeared in a bilingual Icelandic/Danish format. Her poems have been translated into Danish, Swedish, French, German and English. She is a member of the group of poets known as "Ritlistarhópur Kópavogs".

== Awards ==
Anna Svanhildur received the Jean Monnet Prize for Poetry in 1993.

== See also ==
- List of Icelandic writers
- Culture of Iceland
