= Ágústína Jónsdóttir =

Icelandic writer, artist and educator (born 1949)

Ágústína Jónsdóttir (born 4 May 1949) is an Icelandic writer, artist and educator.

She was born in Reykjavík, studied cosmetics and later graduated as a pre-school teacher. In 1991, she received a teaching diploma from the Iceland College of Education. She works as an elementary school teacher in Kópavogur, a suburb of Reykjavík.

In 1994, she published her first collection of poetry Að baki mánans ("Behind the Moon"). She has since published several other collections. Her work has been translated into English and French. One of her books was nominated for Dagblaðið Vísir's literary prize in 1997.

== See also ==
- List of Icelandic writers
- Icelandic literature

== Selected works ==
- Lífakur ("Field of Life") (1995)
- Ljósar hendur: þrjár íslenskar skáldkonur svífa sólgeislavængjum Snjóbirta ("SnowLight") (1995)
- Sónata ("Sonata") (1997)
- Vorflauta ("Spring Flute") (2000)
