= Bogi Ágústsson =

Icelandic public television journalist

Bogi Ágústsson is a public television news reporter in Iceland.

He graduated in history from the University of Iceland in 1977. He began working as a reporter of foreign news on TV News in January 1977. He moved to Copenhagen in 1984, and brought news from the Nordic countries until 1986. In 1988, he became a press officer and director of the Radio company's communications department. In later years, he largely confined himself to the anchorship.

He received the knight's cross of the Order of the Falcon in 2019. As of 2019, he was the chairman of the Icelandic branch of Foreningen Norden.

== See also ==
- List of Icelandic writers
