= Eyvindur P. Eiríksson =

Icelandic writer (1935–2026)

- Born: 13 December 1935; Hnífsdalur, Iceland
- Died: 23 August 2026 (aged 90); Reykjavík, Iceland
- Occupations: Writer and teacher

Eyvindur Pétur Eiríksson (13 December 1935 – 23 August 2026) was an Icelandic writer. He wrote poetry, novels and plays. His works address concerns about modern alienation and the relationship between man and nature, often approached with dark humour. His novel Landið handan fjarskans received the Halldór Laxness Literary Prize and was nominated for the Icelandic Literary Prize in 1997.

Eyvindur was a teacher and worked in Icelandic radio and television before writing became his main occupation. He was the father of the rappers Sesar A and Blaz Roca. He was a regional leader within the neopagan organisation Ásatrúarfélagið.

== Early life and education ==
Eyvindur Pétur Eiríksson was born in Hnífsdalur on 13 December 1935. His parents were Eiríkur A. Guðjónsson (1908–2007), who was a farmer, fisherman and labourer, and Gunnvör Rósa Samúelsdóttir (1905–1967). Eyvindur grew up in Hornstrandir and Ísafjörður and went to school at Akureyri Junior College. After finishing his stúdentspróf in 1955, he worked in the fishing industry, construction, an office and began to teach. In 1964, he received his B.A. from the University of Iceland in Reykjavík, where he studied Danish, English and pedagogy. He later studied Icelandic and Finnish and received a degree in Icelandic grammar in 1977.

== Career ==
=== Teaching and media ===
For many years, Eyvindur's main profession was teaching on different levels. From 1961 to 1972, he taught at elementary and secondary schools in Reykjavík, Kópavogur and Ísafjörður. From 1972 to 1979, he taught in various capacities at the Iceland College of Education, Tækniskóli Íslands and evening courses, and in 1977–1979 at the University of Iceland. He was a lecturer at the University of Helsinki in 1979–1980 and taught Icelandic at the University of Copenhagen in 1980–1986.

In 1978 and 1979, Eyvindur was responsible for RÚV's radio programme Daglegt mál (lit. 'Daily speech'). While he lived in Finland he acted as a radio news correspondent for RÚV. In 1979 he took part in making two television programmes about the Icelandic language.

=== Writing ===
Eyvindur continued to do some teaching, but writing became his main focus around 1987 and his principal occupation after he returned to Iceland in 1990. He has written around 40 works of literature, including poetry collections, novels and plays. According to the literary scholar Bjarki Valtýsson, Eyvindur's poetry is characterised by warmth and intimacy, resulting from his tendency to not take himself too seriously despite having a clear message. Eyvindur's first book of poetry, Hvenær? (lit. 'When?'), came out in 1974. It uses dark humour to address modern alienation and consumerism, as well as more topical subjects such as the Vietnam War and the American military base in Keflavík, without becoming politically programmatic. Similar themes of how mankind has become too detached from its roots in nature, treated with humour and irony, appear in the poetry collections Hvaðan – Þaðan (1978, lit. 'Whence – thence'), Viltu (1989, lit. 'Would you') and Vertu (1998, lit. 'Be'). In the later collections the imagery is more concise and the poems draw influence from folktales and Old Norse poems such as Hávamál and Völuspá. For his poetry collection Óreiðum augum: heiðin ljóð (2001, lit. 'Eyes without anger: pagan poems'), his friend Hilmar Örn Hilmarsson set the poems to music and the book was published with a CD. The poems in this collection concern nature and contrast its beauty with the ego of modern man, which they associate with decline and alienation.

His first published novel, Múkkinn (lit. 'The fulmar'), came out in 1988. It is set aboard an Icelandic fishing trawler, with no clear protagonist among the cast of characters, and depicts a raw, unromantic struggle for survival. Eyvindur received the Halldór Laxness Literary Prize and was nominated for the Icelandic Literary Prize in 1997 for his second novel, Landið handan fjarskans (lit. 'The land beyond far away'). Set at the turn of the 19th century, it contains strong criticism of warfare and follows an Icelander who changes his name and identity multiple times as circumstances place him in different roles and countries. In the sequel Þar sem blómið vex og vatnið fellur (1999, lit. 'Where the flower grows and the water falls'), the protagonist is back in Iceland and is confronted with powers that inhibit nature. All three novels concern the relationship between man and nature in different ways. The novel Glass: saga af glæpum og glöpum (lit. 'Glass: a story of crime and folly') criticises capitalism and contemporary Western Europe through a dystopian story where pollution and starvation are rampant, Reykjavík is covered by glass and the Icelandic language is being replaced by English. Eyvindur tried to find a publisher for the novel for ten years before he self-published it in 2007.

Two books for children and teenagers, Á háskaslóð (1993, lit. 'On the path to danger') and Meðan skútan skríður (1995, lit. 'Whilst the small ship sails'), are about an eccentric teacher and his two sons. The books address family ties and environmental issues as the main characters go on a sailing vacation in the Baltic Sea.

Eyvindur was a member of the Icelandic Language Committee as the Writer's Union's representative. In 2015, his 80th birthday was celebrated with public events at the Nordic House and the bar Sólon in Reykjavík, where scholars gave presentations about his works and career and musicians performed his poetry.

== Personal life and death ==
Eyvindur married in 1961. He has three sons and one daughter. His sons Eyjólfur "Sesar A" Eyvindarson and Erpur "Blaz Roca" Eyvindarson are rappers and have been influential in Icelandic hip hop.

He was engaged in the neopagan organisation Ásatrúarfélagið where he was the Vestfirðingagoði, which means he was the main organiser responsible for the Westfjords region. Since 2006 he performed legally binding marriages. He wrote the introduction to an edition of Hávamál published by Ásatrúarfélagið in 2007.

Eyvindur died on 23 August 2026, at the age of 90.

== Selected publications ==
Bibliographic details adapted from the Icelandic Literature Web.

- Hvenær? (1974, Iðunn, poems)
- Hvaðan – Þaðan (1978, Letur, poems)
- Múkkinn (1988, Iðunn, novel)
- Viltu (1989, Óskráð, poems)
- Á háskaslóð (1993, Mál og menning, children's book)
- Meðan skútan skríður (1995, Mál og menning, children's book)
- Landið handan fjarskans (1997, Vaka-Helgafell, novel)
- Vertu (1998, Óskráð, poems)
- Þar sem blómið vex og vatnið fellur (1999, Vaka-Helgafell, novel)
- Óreiðum augum: heiðin ljóð (2001, Andblær, poems)
- Glass: saga af glæpum og glöpum (2007, EPE, novel)
