= Björn Th. Björnsson =

Icelandic writer

Björn Theodor Björnsson (September 3, 1922 – August 25, 2007) was an Icelandic writer born in Reykjavík. He attended the University of London, University of Edinburgh, and the University of Copenhagen. He was President of the Icelandic writers union for a time. He was married to an artist, Ásgerður Búadóttir, and has written several popular historical novels.

== See also ==
- List of Icelandic writers
- Icelandic literature
