= Þórður Helgason =

Icelandic writer

Þórður Helgason (born 5 November 1947, in Reykjavík) is an Icelandic writer and educationalist.

== Life ==
In 1977, Þórður graduated as a Cand. mag. in Icelandic literature from the University of Iceland. He is now a docent in Icelandic at the Iceland University of Education. He was also editor of the Icelandic poetry magazine Són 2003–2011.

== Works ==
- Gamalt og nýtt eftir Þorgils gjallanda. Reykjavík : s.n., 1972
- Kennaraskólakórinn 1972. Reykjavík : s.n., 1972
- (ed.), Þorgils gjallandi, Sögur : úrval. Reykjavík : Rannsóknastofnun í bókmenntafræði : Menningarsjóður, 1978
- (ed., with Jóhanna Hauksdóttir), Þorgils gjallandi, Ritsafn. Hafnarfjörður : Skuggsjá, 1982-1984
- Örbirgð og auður. Reykjavík : Námsgagnastofnun, 1983
- Ævi : æska, þroski, elli. Reykjavík : Námsgagnastofnun, 1983
- Siðir : siðir og venjur í samskiptum barna og fullorðinna. Fylgirit, Kennsluleiðbeiningar. Reykjavík : Námsgagnastofnun : Menntamálaráðuneytið, skólarannsóknadeild, 1984
- Saman. Fylgirit, Kennsluleiðbeiningar. Reykjavík : Námsgagnastofnun, 1985
- Ég er kölluð Lilla. Reykjavík : Námsgagnastofnun, 1985
- Þar var ég. Reykjavík : Goðorð, 1989
- Kveðja: Fylgirit, Kennsluleiðbeiningar með lesörkinni Kveðja. Reykjavík : Námsgagnastofnun; Reykjavík : Námsgagnastofnun, 1990
- Langamma. Reykjavík : Barnabókaútgáfan, 1990
- (with Árný Elíasdóttir and Gísli Ásgeirsson), Nýtt námsefni í móðurmáli fyrir 3.-6. bekk : greinargerð og tillögur. Reykjavík : s.n., 1990
- Ljós ár. Reykjavík : Goðorð, 1991
- Áni ánamaðkur. Reykjavík : Barnabókaútgáfan, 1991
- Aftur að vori. Reykjavík : Goðorð, 1993
- (with Herdís Hübner), Og enginn sagði neitt : þrjár smásögur. Reykjavík : Námsgagnastofnun, 1994
- Meðan augun lokast. Reykjavík : höfundur, 1995
- (with Gísli Ásgeirsson), Skinna : námsbók í móðurmáli. Reykjavík : Námsgagnastofnun, 1995
- Geta englar talað dönsku?. Reykjavík : Mál og menning, 1996
- Ljósmál. Kópavogur : Ritlistarhópur Kópavogs, 1997
- Kennsluleiðbeiningar með Sölku Völku. Reykjavík : Vaka-Helgafell, 1997
- (with Gísli Ásgeirsson and Halldór Baldursson), Skræða : námsbók í móðurmáli. Reykjavík : Námsgagnastofnun, 1997
- (ed., with Hildur Hermóðsdóttir), Áfram Óli! : smásagnasafn fyrir grunnskóla. Reykjavík : Mál og menning, 1998
- (with Gísli Ásgeirsson and Þorsteinn S. Guðjónsson), Skrudda : námsbók í móðurmáli. Reykjavík : Námsgagnastofnun, 1998
- Tilbúinn undir tréverk. Reykjavík : Mál og menning, 1998
- (ed.), Sex í ljóðum. Reykjavík : Ljóðnemar, 1998
- Einn fyrir alla. Reykjavík : Mál og menning, 1999
- (ed., with Baldur Hafstað), Imbudagar : haldnir Ingibjörgu B. Frímannsdóttur fimmtugri, 18. December 2000. Reykjavík : Meistaraútgáfan, 2000
- (with Baldur Hafstað), Lifandi frásagnir í skólum. Reykjavík : Kennaraháskóli Íslands, 2002
- (ed., with Baldur Hafstæað), Ljóðaþing : um íslenska ljóðagerð á 20. öld. Reykjavík : Ormstunga, 2002
- (ed., with Baldur Hafstað), Fáfnis hjarta við funa steikir : Sigurður Konráðsson fimmtugur 18. ágúst 2003. Þaralátursfirði rétt Reykjavík : Meistaraútgáfan, 2003
- (ed.), Ljóð og litir. Kópavogur : skáldin og listamennirnir, 2004
- (trans., with Michael Dal), Thorstein Thomsen, Græna slumman og önnur ljóð : stelpur og strákar innst inni. Reykjavík : Iða, 2004
- (ed., with Ingibjörg Einarsdóttir), Lesefni við lokahátíðir Stóru upplestrarkeppninnar í 7. bekk 2003–2004. S.l. : Undirbúningsnefnd um landskeppni í upplestri, 2004
- (ed.), Ljóð og myndir. Kópavogur : höfundur, 2005
- (ed., with Ingibjörg Einarsdóttir), Lesefni við lokahátíðir Stóru upplestrarkeppninnar í 7. bekk 2004–2005. S.l. : Raddir, 2005
- (ed., with Hjörtur Pálsson, Vésteinn Ólason, and Vigdís Finnbogadóttir), Hugðarefni : afmæliskveðjur til Njarðar P. Njarðvík, 30. júní 2006. Reykjavík : JPV, 2006
- Smárarnir. Reykjavík : Salka, 2007
- (ed., with Ragnar Ingi Aðalsteinsson), Fylgdarmaður húmsins : heildarkvæðasafn Kristjáns frá Djúpalæk. Reykjavík : Hólar, 2007
- (with Ingibjörg B. Frímannsdóttir), Sveinn í djúpum dali : um Jónas Hallgrímsson. Reykjavík : Hólar, 2007
- Þórðarbókin : ljóðasafn, ed. by Sigurlín Bjarney Gísladóttir. Reykjavík : Nykur, 2008
- (ed., with Ingibjörg Einarsdóttir), Lesefni við lokahátíðir Stóru upplestrarkeppninnar í 7. bekk 2007–2008. S.l. : Raddir, 2008
- Vinur, sonur, bróðir. Reykjavík : Salka, 2010
- (ed.), Vor í Gjábakka. Kópavogur : höfundar, 2011
- (ed., with Baldur Hafstað), Læðingur : heildstætt efni í íslensku fyrir 5. bekk : lesbók A. Reykjavík : Skólavefurinn, 2011
- (ed.), Ljóðflæði : Gjábakki 20 ára. Kópavogur : höfundar, 2013
- 52 sonnettur : ástarsaga. Selfoss : Bókasmiðjan, 2014
- (ed.), Lífið er ljóð. Kópavogur : höfundar, 2014
- (with Árni Björnsson, Gunnar Guttormsson and Silja Aðalsteinsdóttir), Sóley sólufegri : um Sóleyjarkvæði Jóhannesar úr Kötlum og tónstef Péturs Pálssonar. Reykjavík : Mál og menning, 2017
