= Þórarinn Skeggjason =

Icelandic skald

Þórarinn Skeggjason (Old Norse: [ˈθoːrɑrenː ˈskeɡːjɑˌson]; Modern Icelandic: [ˈθouːrarɪn ˈscɛcːaˌsɔːn]) was an 11th-century Icelandic skald. According to Skáldatal, he was a court poet of the Norwegian king Harald Hardrada. He composed a drápa on the king. Only one half-stanza of it has been preserved in the kings' sagas. It tells that Harald blinded the Byzantine emperor Constantine Monomachos. This episode is also mentioned by Þjóðólfr Arnórsson in his Sexstefja.
