= Culture of Iceland =

The culture of Iceland is largely characterized by its literary heritage that began during the 12th century but also traditional arts such as weaving, silversmithing, and wood carving. The Reykjavík area hosts several professional theaters, art galleries, bookstores, cinemas and museums. There are four active folk dance ensembles in Iceland. Iceland's literacy rate is among the highest in the world.

== Arts ==
=== Architecture ===
Icelandic architecture draws from Scandinavia and traditionally was influenced by the lack of native trees on the island. As a result, grass and turf-covered houses were developed. The original grass houses constructed by the original settlers of Iceland were based on Viking longhouses.

=== Literature ===
Much of the history of Iceland has been recorded in the Icelandic sagas and Edda. The most famous of these include Njáls saga, about an epic blood feud, and Grænlendinga saga and Eiríks saga, describing the discovery and settlement of Greenland and Vinland (now the Canadian province of Newfoundland and Labrador). Egils saga, Laxdæla saga, Grettis saga, Gísla saga, and Gunnlaugs saga ormstungu are also notable and popular.

Iceland has produced many great authors including Halldór Laxness, Guðmundur Kamban, Tómas Guðmundsson, Davíð Stefánsson, Jón Thoroddsen, Steinn Steinarr, Guðmundur G. Hagalín, Þórbergur Þórðarson, and Jóhannes úr Kötlum. W. H. Auden and Louis MacNeice wrote Letters From Iceland (1937) to describe their travels through that country.

=== Painting and sculpture ===
The first professional secular painters appeared in Iceland in the 19th century. This group of artists included Jóhannes Sveinsson Kjarval, who painted village life in Iceland. Ásmundur Sveinsson, a 20th-century sculptor, was from Iceland. Einar Hákonarson is an expressionistic and figurative painter who brought the figure back into Icelandic painting in 1968. He is a pioneer in the Icelandic art scene and art education. He has been called "The crusader of the painting", because of his involvement in those conflicts many Icelandic painters had with the public fine art centers. He was a driving force in founding the Icelandic Printmaking Association and its first president.

== Attitudes and customs ==
Icelanders generally have a traditional liberal Nordic outlook, similar to other Nordic countries such as Norway and Sweden. Yet, an important key to understanding Icelanders and their culture (which differentiates them from the majority of their contemporary Nordic peoples) is the high importance they place on the traits of independence and self-sufficiency. In the June 2005 European Commission Eurobarometer public opinion analysis, over 85% of Icelanders found independence to be "very important", contrasted with the EU25 average of 53%, 47% for the Norwegians, and 49% for the Danish.

Icelanders are proud of their Viking heritage and Icelandic language and take great care to preserve their traditions. Modern Icelandic remains close to the Old Norse spoken in the Viking Age. Prior to the Christianization of Iceland, Pagan beliefs were strongly held, remnants of which remain today.

Icelandic society and culture has a high degree of gender equality, with many women in leadership positions in government and business. Iceland has a highly progressive gay rights legislation, with couples having been able to register civil unions since 1996, adopt since 2006, and marry since 2010. Women retain their names after marriage, since Icelanders generally do not use surnames but patronyms or (in certain cases) matronyms.

The 2003 Children's Act outlawed spanking, verbal and emotional abuse, and makes child protection a priority. Physical or mental violence is punishable by imprisonment and/or fine. In 2006, Iceland was ranked as the fourth happiest nation in the world. Local and national festivals include the annual National Day, celebrating the country's independence in 1944, Sumardagurinn fyrsti which celebrates the first day of summer, and Sjómannadagurinn which is held every June to pay tribute to the country's maritime history.

== Cuisine ==
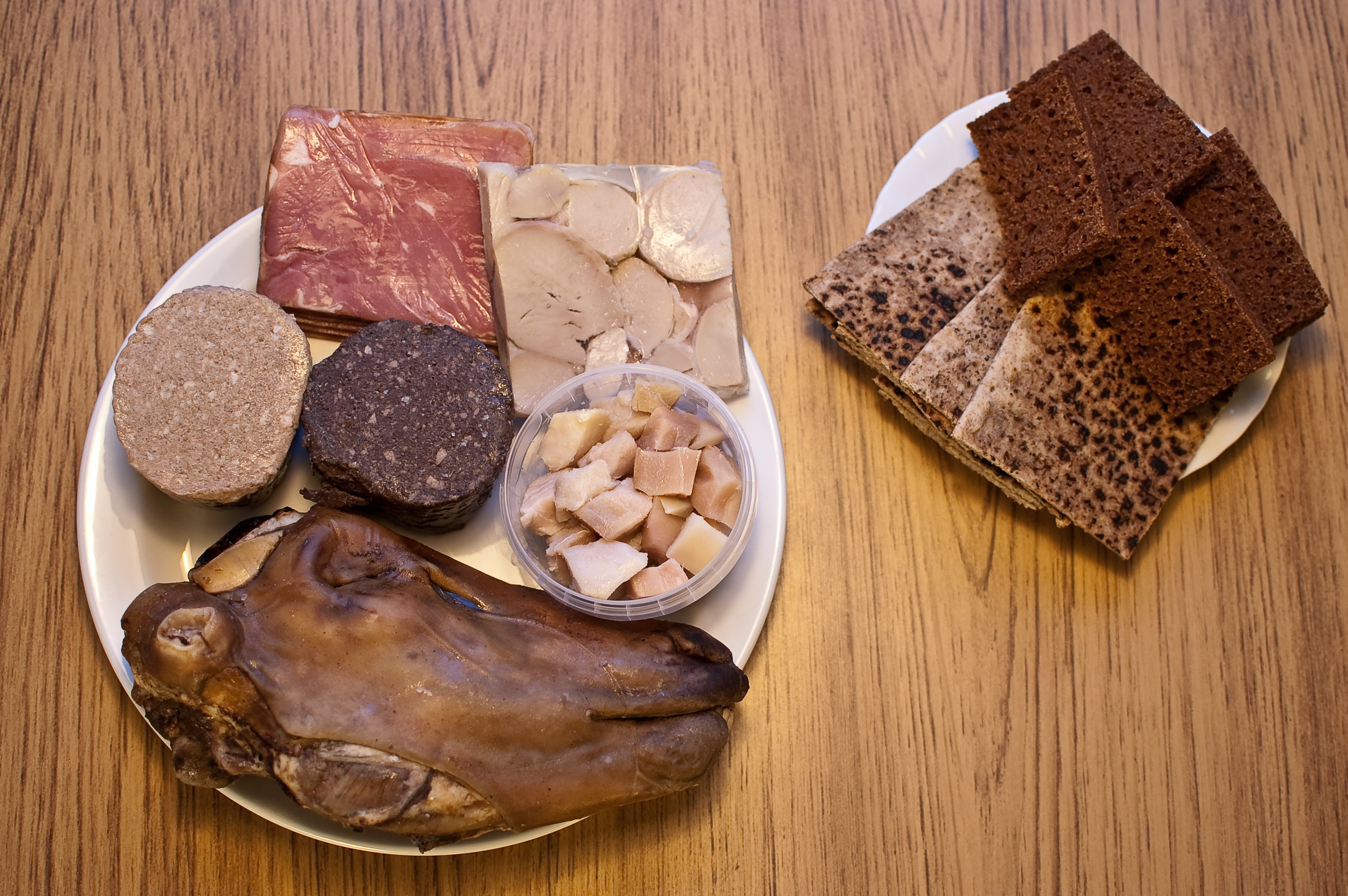
A typical Þorramatur assortment.

Iceland offers wide varieties of traditional cuisine. Þorramatur (food of the þorri) is the Icelandic national food. Nowadays þorramatur is mostly eaten during the ancient Nordic month of þorri, in January and February, as a tribute to old culture. Þorramatur consists of many different types of food. These are mostly offal dishes like hrútspungar (pickled ram's testicles), putrefied shark, singed sheep heads, singed sheep head jam, black pudding, liver sausage (similar to Scottish haggis) and dried fish (often cod or haddock).

Much of the cuisine centers on Iceland's fishing industry. Traditional dishes include gravlax (smoked salmon marinated in salt and dill), hangikjöt (smoked lamb), and slátur (sausages made from sheep entrails). A popular food is skyr made of cultured skim milk. Brennivin is an Icelandic liquor made from potatoes and caraway.

== Education ==
The system of education in Iceland is loosely based upon the Danish system, and there are four levels: pre-school, compulsory, upper secondary and higher. Education is mandatory for children aged six to sixteen. Most institutions are funded by the state, there are very few private schools in the country. The Ministry of Education, Science and Culture has jurisdiction over education. Over the years, the educational system has been decentralised, and responsibility for primary and lower secondary schools lies with the local authorities. The state runs upper secondary schools and higher education institutions. Students can quit at age 16 or can continue until age 20.

== Entertainment ==
The popular children's TV programme LazyTown (Latibær), created by Magnús Scheving, was produced in Iceland. Notable Icelandic musicians and bands include Björk, Kaleo (band), Sigur Rós, Laufey, and Of Monsters and Men.

=== Technology ===
Iceland is a technologically advanced and digitally-connected country. In 2006 it had the highest number of broadband Internet connections per capita among OECD countries.

== Icelandic people ==
Famous early Icelanders were Leif Erikson, who introduced Christianity to Greenland and discovered the North American mainland (c. 1000). Two famous statesmen were Bishop Jón Arason and Jón Sigurðsson, who championed for autonomy from Denmark. Vigdís Finnbogadóttir served four consecutive terms as president from 1980 to 1996, becoming the first female elected to the presidency of any republic.

Prominent writers were Ari Þorgilsson, father of Icelandic historical writing; Snorri Sturluson, author of the famous Prose Edda, a collection of Norse myths; and Hallgrímur Pétursson, author of Iceland's beloved Passion Hymns. Leading poets include Bjarni Thorarensen and Jónas Hallgrímsson, pioneers of the Romantic movement in Iceland; Matthías Jochumsson, author of Iceland's national anthem; Þorsteinn Erlingsson, lyricist; Einar Hjörleifsson Kvaran, a pioneer of realism in Icelandic literature and an outstanding short-story writer; Einar Benediktsson, ranked as one of the greatest modern Icelandic poets; Jóhann Sigurjónsson, who lived much of his life in Denmark and wrote many plays based on Icelandic history and legend, as well as poetry; and the novelist Halldór Laxness, who received the Nobel Prize for literature in 1955.

Stefán Stefánsson was the pioneer Icelandic botanist. Helgi Pjeturss, geologist and philosopher, was an authority on the Ice Age and the geology of Iceland. The former world chess champion Bobby Fischer became an Icelandic citizen in 2005. Russian pianist and composer Vladimir Ashkenazy has been a citizen since 1972.

== Language ==
The principal language of Iceland is Icelandic, a highly inflected North Germanic language. Danish and English are also taught in schools. Linguistic purism is strongly supported in Iceland to prevent loanwords from entering the language. Instead, neologisms are coined from Icelandic roots, creating a compound word to describe new concepts. For example, the word for computer (an introduced object) is tölva which combines the ancient terms for number and seer. It is often the case that old words which are no longer used are recycled with a new meaning.

== Leisure ==
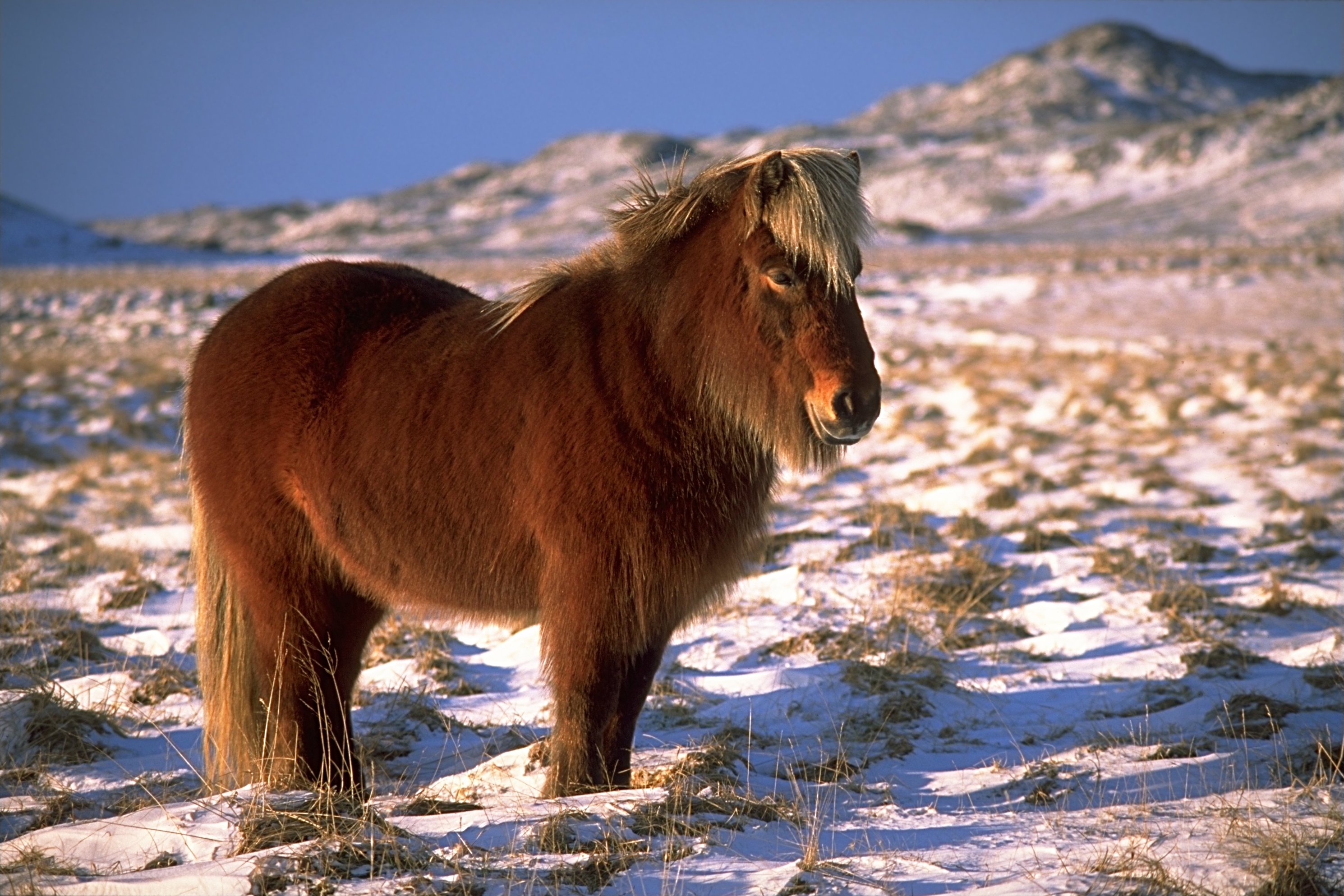
An Icelandic horse in winter.

Though changing in the past years, Icelanders remain a very healthy nation. Children and teenagers participate in various types of leisure activities. Popular sports today are mainly soccer, athletics, handball and basketball. Sports such as tennis, swimming, chess and horseback riding are also popular.

Chess has historically been a common pastime in Iceland. The country's chess clubs have produced chess grandmasters such as Friðrik Ólafsson, Jóhann Hjartarson, Margeir Pétursson, and Jón Loftur Árnason. Glíma is a form of wrestling that is still practiced in Iceland, thought to have originated with the Vikings. Golf is common; around 1 in 8 Icelanders play the sport. Handball is often referred to as a national sport, Iceland's team is one of the top ranked teams in the world, and Icelandic women are surprisingly good at soccer compared to the size of the country, the national team ranked the 18th best by FIFA.

Ice climbing and rock climbing are favorites among many Icelanders, for example to climb the top of the 4,167-foot (1,270 metre) Þumall peak in Skaftafell is a challenge for many adventurous climbers, but mountain climbing is considered to be more suitable for the general public and is a very common type of leisure activity. Hvítá, among many other of the Icelandic glacial rivers, attracts kayakers and river rafters worldwide.

== Music ==
Icelandic music is related to Nordic music forms, and includes vibrant folk and pop traditions, including medieval music group Voces Thules. The only folk band whose recordings are available abroad is Islandica.

The national anthem of Iceland is "Lofsöngur", composed by Matthías Jochumsson and Sveinbjörn Sveinbjörnsson. The song was written in 1874, when Iceland celebrated the one thousandth anniversary of settlement on the island. It was in the form of a hymn, first published under the title A Hymn in Commemoration of Iceland's Thousand Years.

== Religion ==
Norse Paganism was the primary religion among the Norsemen who settled Iceland in the 9th century AD. Christianity later came to Iceland around 1000 AD. In the middle of the 16th century, the Danish crown formally declared Lutheranism the state religion under the Icelandic Reformation. This increasing Christianization culminated in the Pietism period when non-Christian entertainments were discouraged. At present the population is overwhelmingly, if nominally, Lutheran (75.4% in 2017). Other denominations of Christianity are also practiced such as Catholicism and Mormonism. Other major religions that are practiced include Islam, Judaism, and various folk religions such as Ásatrúarfélagið.

== Tourism ==
One of the most popular tourist attractions in Iceland is visiting the geothermal spas and pools that can be found all around the country, such as Bláa Lónið (The Blue Lagoon) on the Reykjanes Peninsula near the Keflavík International Airport.

== Transport ==
There are no railways in Iceland. The country has an extensive road network, and a ring road follows the coast, so that one can drive around the island. Road routes in some parts of the country (e.g. the Westfjords) are very circuitous, and many roads are closed for a long winter season, so air and sea transport are popular to connect remoter areas.

== See also ==
- Cinema of Iceland
- Icelandic National Costume
- Lopapeysa
- List of libraries in Iceland
- Museums in Iceland
- Public holidays in Iceland
- Strip club ban in Iceland
- Center for Icelandic Art
