= Voces Thules =

Icelandic ensemble group

Voces Thules is an Icelandic music ensemble formed in 1992. The ensemble consists of five male singers (Eggert Pálsson, Einar Jóhannesson, Eiríkur Hreinn Helgason, Eyjólfur Eyjólfsson and Sigurður Halldórsson) who have studied in Reykjavík, London and Vienna, specializing in Icelandic medieval and contemporary music. Apart from working with Voces Thules, the members have individual careers as instrumentalists and singers.

Voces Thules have performed at various international festivals, such as the 20th anniversary of the Utrecht Early Music Festival in the Netherlands, and at the 50th anniversary of the Bergen International Arts Festival, where Voces Thules performed two concerts with medieval music from Icelandic manuscripts. The ensemble has recorded for radio and television and in 2006 released "Office of Saint Thorlak" (Þorlákstíðir), the only Icelandic saint, based on a manuscript from around 1400. They later performed from that album at the Reykjavik Cathedral in honour of the 800th anniversary of Thorlak's enshrinement. They were nominated for the Nordic Council Music Prize 2008.
