= Sölvi Fannar =

Icelandic actor, producer, athlete, & writer (born 1971)

Sölvi Fannar (born Sölvi Fannar Viðarsson on April 26, 1971) is an Icelandic actor, producer, health counsellor, writer, multi sport athlete, public speaker, musician, conceptual artist and poet. He studied acting at the Icelandic Film School. Fannar participated in TEDxLambeth 2019 as a speaker. In 2014, Solvi competed in mas-wrestling in Siberia. Solvi is also the official agent for Hafþór Júlíus Björnsson.

== Filmography ==
Year	Title	Role
1984	Atómstöðin (The Atom Station)	Boy
1991	Börn Náttúrunnar (Children of Nature)	High voltage specialist
2000	Englar Alheimsins (Angels of the Universe)	Warden
2012	Game of Thrones (Game of Thrones)	Wildling
2016	Reykjavík	Trausti
2016	Cable: Chronicles of Hope (Short)	Cable (Nathan Summers)
2017	Casus Belli (Short)	Richard I 'Lionheart'
2017	Beast (Short)	Viking Chieftain
2018	Operation Ragnarök	Egill Sturlaugsson - Viking Squad Leader
2019	Margery Booth: The Spy in the Eagle's Nest	Oberst Prince Waldemar
2019	Three Dots and a Dash	Boris Popov

== Bibliography ==
Year	Title
2002	Heilsuátak 2002 (The Wellness-Initiative 2002)
2004	Heilsudagbókin (The Health-Diary)
2007	Kaloríukvótinn (The Calorie-Quota)
2021	Bingóvöðvar (Bingo-muscles)
2021	Who Guards The Guardians - Quis Custodiet Ipsos Custodes
2021	The Calorie-Quota, eat S.M.A.R.T. to get hard!

== See also ==
- List of Icelandic writers
