= Gamli gnævaðarskáld =

Icelandic skald

Gamli gnævaðarskáld was an Icelandic skald.

One half-stanza from a poem about Thor dealing with the god's fight against Jörmungandr and one fragment from a poem about an unidentifiable king are all that survive of his work. They were preserved in Snorri Sturluson's Skáldskaparmál (4, 64).

It is often stated that Gamli lived in the 10th century but Rudolf Simek and Hermann Pálsson consider this "pure speculation".

The meaning of Gamli's nickname is unclear. He may have composed a poem about a person whose nickname was Gnævaðr ("raised high", "towering"). Rudolf Simek and Hermann Pálsson suggest that "Gnævaðar" may apply to Gamli himself. The nickname should thus be understood as "the outstanding skald".
