= Völu-Steinn =

Icelandic skald

Völu-Steinn is an Icelandic skald of the mid-10th century. Two half-stanzas have come down to us, both preserved in Snorri Sturluson's Skáldskaparmál (3, 57). As Landnámabók (S 142) mentions Völu-Steinn's great sorrow at the death of his son Ögmundr, it is generally admitted that these verse belong to a poem in memory of his son. Sigurður Nordal suggested Völu-Steinn as a possible author of Völuspá.
