= Bergljót Arnalds =

Icelandic actress, writer, television representative and producer

- Born: 15 October 1968 (age 57)
- Occupations: Actress, writer, and television representative and producer

Bergljót Arnalds (born 15 October 1968) is an Icelandic actress, writer, television representative and producer. She has been awarded the Icelandic AUÐAR-verðlaunin, a pioneer's award, for creating the first Icelandic computer game, Stafakarlarnir.

She is best known for being the author of a best-selling children's book and for her TV work. She was the producer and host of children's television program 2001 nights, which aired on SkjárEinn.

She has played various roles on stage and in films. Among her roles are Dolly in The Devil's Island, Lucy in Dracula, Stella in A Streetcar Named Desire and Sophie in Sophie's World.

== Books ==
- 1996 – Stafakarlarnir (Icelandic)

2006 – The Most Amazing Alphabet Tale (English)

- 1997 – Tóta og Tíminn
- 1998 – Talnapúkinn
- 2001 – Gralli Gormur og stafaseiðurinn mikli
- 2001 – Í leit að tímanum
- 2003 – Gralli Gormur og litadýrðin mikla
- 2005 – Jólasveinasaga (Icelandic)

2005 – The Thirteen Icelandic Santas (English)

- 2007 – Gralli Gormur og dýrin í Afríku (Icelandic)

2007 – Mousey Rattail in Africa (English)

- 2011 – Íslensku Húsdýrin og Trölli (Icelandic)
- 2015 – Rusladrekinn (Icelandic)

== CD-Roms ==
- 1997 – Stafakarlarnir
- 1999 – Talnapúkinn
- 2004 – Gralli Gormur og stafirnir

== See also ==
- List of Icelandic writers
- Icelandic literature
