= Bergþóra Árnadóttir =

Icelandic folk song composer and singer

Bergþóra Árnadóttir (15 February 1948 – 8 March 2007) was an Icelandic folk song composer and singer. Many of her songs were built around the lyrics of Icelandic poets. In the mid-1970s, she hosted and performed in one of Icelandic TVs first music shows, Kvartett Guðmundar Steingríms.

She was the mother of Pirate Party's leader Birgitta Jónsdóttir.

== See also ==
- List of Icelandic writers
- Icelandic literature
