= Magnús Jónsson í Tjaldanesi =

Magnús Jónsson í Tjaldanesi (1835-1922) was one of the foremost Icelandic scribes of his time.

== Life ==
Magnús received no formal education, and spent most of his life as a farmer living on the farm Tjaldanes in Dalasýsla, for which he is named.

== Copying ==
Magnús is known today for his extraordinary output as a scribe, copying Icelandic sagas. He is unusual, if not unique, for only copying works in this form (and not, for example, poetry or genealogies). As of 2013, 43 surviving manuscripts by Magnús had been identified, comprising 28,000 pages, or over 6 million words. Magnús appears to have begun copying in his teens, but the datable manuscripts are from the period 1874-1916 (though nine are undated and seem to be from before 1874). In total, these contain copies of 171 different sagas—the majority of which Magnús copied two to four times. Moreover, at least some (perhaps half) of Magnús's output is now lost.

The sagas that Magnús copied range across the main genres, and include all or nearly all the fornaldarsögur and medieval Icelandic chivalric sagas, along with 28 post-medieval fornaldarsögur and nearly 50 post-medieval romances; 13 translations of German chapbooks; and 10 Íslendingasögur (with other copies known to have been lost). About half of Magnús's surviving manuscripts contain prefaces indicating who he got his exemplars from, naming about 100 individuals. Although Magnús sometimes copied from printed editions, he specified when he did so that he knew the text to have circulated in manuscript form. Like other scribes in the Icelandic saga tradition, Magnús habitually altered the wording of sagas that he copied, though without changing the essentials of the plot; and at times, he seems to have written sagas from memory entirely in his own wording, and sometimes with major changes to the plot, as in his copy of Nítíða saga in Reykjavík, Lbs 1510 4to.

== Influence ==
Perhaps twelve sagas are known solely from Magnús's copying. Magnús supplied the text for the printed edition of Skáld-Helga saga published by Sigfús Eymundsson (1837–1911) in 1897, and in 1909 the National Library of Iceland spent around half its acquisitions budget for the year on a twenty-volume set of his Fornmannasögur norðurlanda (250 krónur).

In recent years, Magnús's work has attracted growing scholarly interest.
