= Davíð Stefánsson =

Icelandic poet and novelist

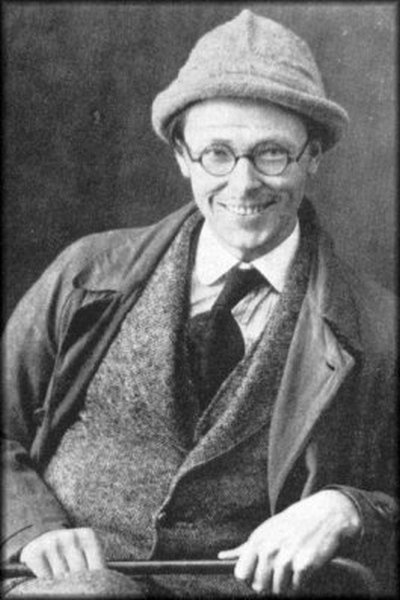
Davíð Stefánsson

Davíð Stefánsson (21 January 1895 – 1 March 1964) was an Icelandic poet and novelist, best known for his ten volumes of poetry.

He was born on 21 January 1895, in Fagriskógur, Eyjafjörður, Iceland and he died on 1 March 1964, in Akureyri, Iceland.

Davíð came of a cultured yeoman family and was brought up with a love for his homeland, its literature, and its folklore. He frequently journeyed abroad but lived most of his life in the town of Akureyri, where he was a librarian (1925–52).

== Novels and plays ==
In 1926, he wrote Munkarnir á Möðruvöllum ("The Monks of Möðruvellir") and in 1941, the powerful novel Sólon Islandus (I - II), a novel about Sölvi Helgason, a daydreaming 19th-century vagabond whose intellectual ambitions are smothered by society.

In 1941, he wrote the successful play, Gullna hliðið ("The Golden Gate") and in 1944, Vopn guðanna ("Weapons of the Gods") and in 1953, his play Landið gleymda ("The Forgotten Country").

== Poetry ==
Davíð's early poetry, including most of his folk themes and love lyrics, appeared in:

- 1919: Svartar fjaðrir ("Black Feathers")
- 1922: Kvæði ("Poems")
- 1924: Kveðjur ("Greetings")
- 1929: Ný Kvæði ("New Poems")

They were combined and published as a collected volume in 1930.

His later poetry—darkening in social satire, reformatory zeal against capitalism and organized religion, and despair over the war—was published as:

- 1933: Í byggðum ("Among Human Habitations")
- 1936: Að norðan ("From the North")
- 1947: Ný kvæðabók ("A New Book of Poems")
- 1966: Síðustu ljóð ("Last Poems") (posthumously)

== See also ==
- List of Icelandic writers
- Icelandic literature
