= Eilífr kúlnasveinn =

Icelandic skald

Eilífr kúlnasveinn is an Icelandic skald who lived in the 12th or 13th century.

Nothing is known of his life, but he may have been a clergyman.

Five fragments of his work have come down to us. One stanza is preserved in the Fourth Grammatical Treatise. Three half-stanzas and a couplet are quoted in Snorri Sturluson's Skáldskaparmál (52) and are generally considered to belong to a poem addressed to Christ (Kristsdrápa), for they appear among the kennings for Christ.
