= Sindri Sindrason =

Icelandic journalist

- Born: 19 July 1978 (age 47)
- Occupations: TV presenter, Journalist
- Spouse: Albert Haagensen (died 2026)
- Children: 1

Sindri Sindrason (born 19 July 1978) is an Icelandic TV presenter and journalist who works as a reporter and one of the hosts of Ísland í dag, a primetime news/talk show, on Sýn.

== Personal life ==
In 2011, Sindri and his husband Albert Haagensen, became the first gay couple in Iceland to adopt a child together.

On 1 January 2026, Albert died from a brain tumor.
