= Álfrún Gunnlaugsdóttir =

Icelandic writer (1938–2021)

Álfrún Gunnlaugsdóttir (18 March 1938 – 15 September 2021) was an Icelandic writer and professor of literature. She wrote seven acclaimed novels in Iceland, and won the DV Literary Award and the Fjöruverðlaun. She was awarded the Knight's Cross of the Icelandic Order of the Falcon in 2018.

== Life ==
Álfrún was born in Reykjavík on 18 March 1938.

After high school, Álfrún went to Spain where she studied literature and philosophy at the University of Barcelona, and the Autonomous University of Barcelona. She later completed a PhD either at the University of Barcelona or at the University of Lausanne in Switzerland, with a thesis titled Tristán en el Norte. She worked in Switzerland, and then as a professor of literature at the University of Iceland until 2006.

She wrote seven acclaimed novels in Iceland. Her debut was a short story collection Af manna völdum (The Works of Man) published in 1982. Her novels included Þel (1984), Hringsól (Circle, 1987), Hvatt að rúnum (Rune Chant, 1993), Yfir Ebrofljótið (Across the Ebro River, 2001), and Rán, 2008. Álfrún grew up at a time when Rekjavik was occupied by UK and American soldiers, and also lived in Spain during fascism, and war and political conflict are common themes in her work.

Álfrún won the DV Literary Award for her first novel, Þel. She was nominated three times for the Nordic Council Literature Prize, for Hringsól, Hvatt að rúnum and Yfir Ebrofljótið. Rán was nominated for the Icelandic Literary Award, and won the DV Cultural Awards and the Fjöruverðlaun (Women’s Literature Prize). In 2018 she was awarded the Knight's Cross of the Icelandic Order of the Falcon, “for her contribution to Icelandic literature and university level education in the field of literature”.

She died in 2021. She had one child.

== See also ==
- List of Icelandic writers
- Icelandic literature
