= Erla Stefánsdóttir =

Icelandic piano-teacher and self-proclaimed seer

Erla Hafstein Stefánsdóttir (6 September 1935 – 5 October 2015) was an Icelandic piano-teacher and self-proclaimed seer. She was a noted public commentator on the topic of the huldufólk, particularly in relation to how they might be affected by building projects such as road-building, housing estates, or power-stations. She also held elf-tours in Hafnarfjörður.

== Publications ==
Erla is noted for her maps of elf-habitats, drawings, and books.

=== Maps ===
- Huliðsheimakort: teikningar af álfabyggð, huliðsvættum og texti Erla Stefánsdóttir; kortlagning álfabyggðar og ljósmyndir Kolbrún Þóra Oddsdóttir (Hafnarfjörður: Ferðamálanefnd Hafnarfjarðar, [1993]) (Hafnarfjörður: hidden worlds map, written by Erla Stefánsdóttir; drawings of elf settlements and spirits, and descriptive text Erla Stefánsdóttir; maps of elf settlements and photography Kolbrún Thóra Oddsdóttir (Hafnarfjörður: Hafnarfjörður Tourism Committee, [1993]; Hafnarfjörður: Karte der verborgenen welten, autor Erla Stefánsdóttir; illustrationen der verborgener Wesen und Elfenhäuser Erla Stefánsdóttir; layout und Kartengestaltung Soffía Árnadóttir; Fotos Jim Smart und Jón Halldór Jónasson; deutsche übersetzung Kerstin Bürling (Hafnarfjörður: Informationszentrum Hafnarfjörður, 2003))
- Ísafjörður: vættakort = Nature spirits; teikningar vætta, orkulínukort og teksti Erla Stefánsdóttir; umsjón ... vættakorts Kolbrún Þóra Oddsdóttir ([Ísafjörður: Ísafjarðarbær], 1994)
- Huliðsheimar Akureyrar (Akureyri: Katrín Jónsdóttir, 2009)

=== Books ===
- Lífssýn mín ([Reykjavík]: Erla Stefánsdóttir, 2003), ISBN 997960901X (ib.); 9789979609018 (Lífssýn mín: Lebenseinsichten der isländischen Elfenbeauftragten, trans. by Hiltrud Hildur Guðmundsdóttir (Saarbrücken: Neue Erde, 2007), ISBN 9783890602646 (ib.); 3890602649)
- Örsögur ([s.l.]: Sigrún Lilja, 2010), ISBN 9789979707356 (ób.); 9979707356 (Brief tales, trans. by Brian Fitzgibbon and Silja Bára Ómarsdóttir ([s.l.]: Sigrún Lilja, 2010), ISBN 9789979707608 (ób.); 9979707607)
- Erlas Elfengeschichten: die »isländische Elfenbeauftragte« erzählt, trans. by Hiltrud Hildur Guðmundsdóttir (Saarbrücken: Neue Erde, 2011), ISBN 9783890605937 (ób.); 3890605931
