= Þjóðólfr Arnórsson =

11th-century Icelandic poet

Þjóðólfr Arnórsson (Old Norse: [ˈθjoːðˌoːlvz̠ ˈɑrnˌoːrsˌson]; Modern Icelandic: Þjóðólfur Arnórsson [ˈθjouːðˌoulvʏr ˈa(r)tnˌour̥sˌsɔːn]; Modern Norwegian: Tjodolv Arnorsson) was an 11th-century Icelandic skáld, who spent his career as a court poet to the Norwegian kings Magnus the Good and Harald Hardrada and is thought to have died with the latter at the Battle of Stamford Bridge in 1066.

== Life ==
Þjóðólfr was born in approximately 1010 in Svarfaðardalur, where his father was a poor farmer. A rival skáld, Sneglu-Halli, told a coarse story about his father at court; in one report of this, he is called Þorljót rather than Arnórr.

He was in Norway between 1031 and 1035, when he composed a poem about Harald Þorkelson of Denmark, who was there at that time. By 1045 he had become a court poet, and after the death of Magnus the Good in 1047, was closely associated with his successor, Harald Hardrada. A story told in both the Heimskringla and Flateyjarbók sagas of Harald Hardrada tells how the king and Þjóðólfr were walking in Trondheim one day and heard a tanner and a smith having a dispute; the king challenged the skáld to make a verse about the incident, but Þjóðólfr at first declined, since it would be inappropriate to his station, "seeing that I am called your Chief Skald". The king then specified that he was to make the verses with the combatants being Sigurðr and Fafnir and then Thor and Geirröðr, but using kennings suited to the men's actual professions, both of which Þjóðólfr did, in a "playful tour de force".

His last verse was composed at the Battle of Stamford Bridge, so he is often believed to have died there with Harald. According to the saga, the wounded king called to him, "Come here and support my head ...—long have I held up your head [i.e., supported and favored you]."

== Works ==
25 stanzas survive of a poem which Þjóðólfr composed in 1045 in dróttkvætt metre about Magnus, the Magnúsflokkr. This covers the king's whole career, from his journey to Garðaríki after the defeat of his father King Olaf to the Battle of Helganes in 1044. Stylistically, it resembles the court poetry of Arnórr jarlaskáld, his close contemporary.

Fragments of four stanzas of a poem in runhent metre about Harald Hardrada survive.

We also possess 35 stanzas of his Sexstefja, a poem about Harald's career composed some 20 years after the Magnúsflokkr, which must have been far longer, since the title implies that it had six burdens, or stef. This must have been "a glorious piece of courtly panegyrics". It can be noted that the term "Serkland" is mentioned in Sexstefja (verse 2), which is relatively rare in contemporary sources from the Viking Age.

In addition, several single stanzas (lausavísur) by him occur in the kings' sagas, dealing with the two kings' campaigns against the Danes. The last is his final verse at Stamford Bridge, showing both loyalty to Harald (whom he speaks of as dead) and disapproval of the expedition to England (hitherto unheard-of respect for the English as foes).

Þjóðólf's verse is notable for its metrical perfection, so much so that it can give an impression of coldness or colourlessness. (However, another anecdote in Morkinskinna has King Harald chide him for not rhyming correctly in a challenge verse.) In the Magnúsflokkr, his style has "baroque" features: he emphasises the burning of farms, states that these were the greatest battles yet fought, and has the stormy waves rolling the skulls of the Danish slain across the sea-floor. By comparison the Sexstefja shows a riper, more classical mastery, which is also to be seen in his matching of imagery to subject in the later lausavísur.

Much of his work is preserved as a record of historical events, as Jan de Vries put it, "one might say ... the work of a royal historiographer, composed in drápa form". This does not, however, mean that it and the historical saga accounts based on it are always reliable; the events in the East alluded to in poems such as the Sexstefja must be at least partly based on Harald's own version of his deeds—another poet's statement that Harald conquered Jerusalem is an example that is clearly untrue. Also the saga authors sometimes have difficulty interpreting the poems; in the case of Sexstefja, they are confused by references to "French", "Lombards" and "Bulgurs" into wrongly locating events.
