= Linda Vilhjálmsdóttir =

Icelandic writer, poet, and playwright (born 1958)

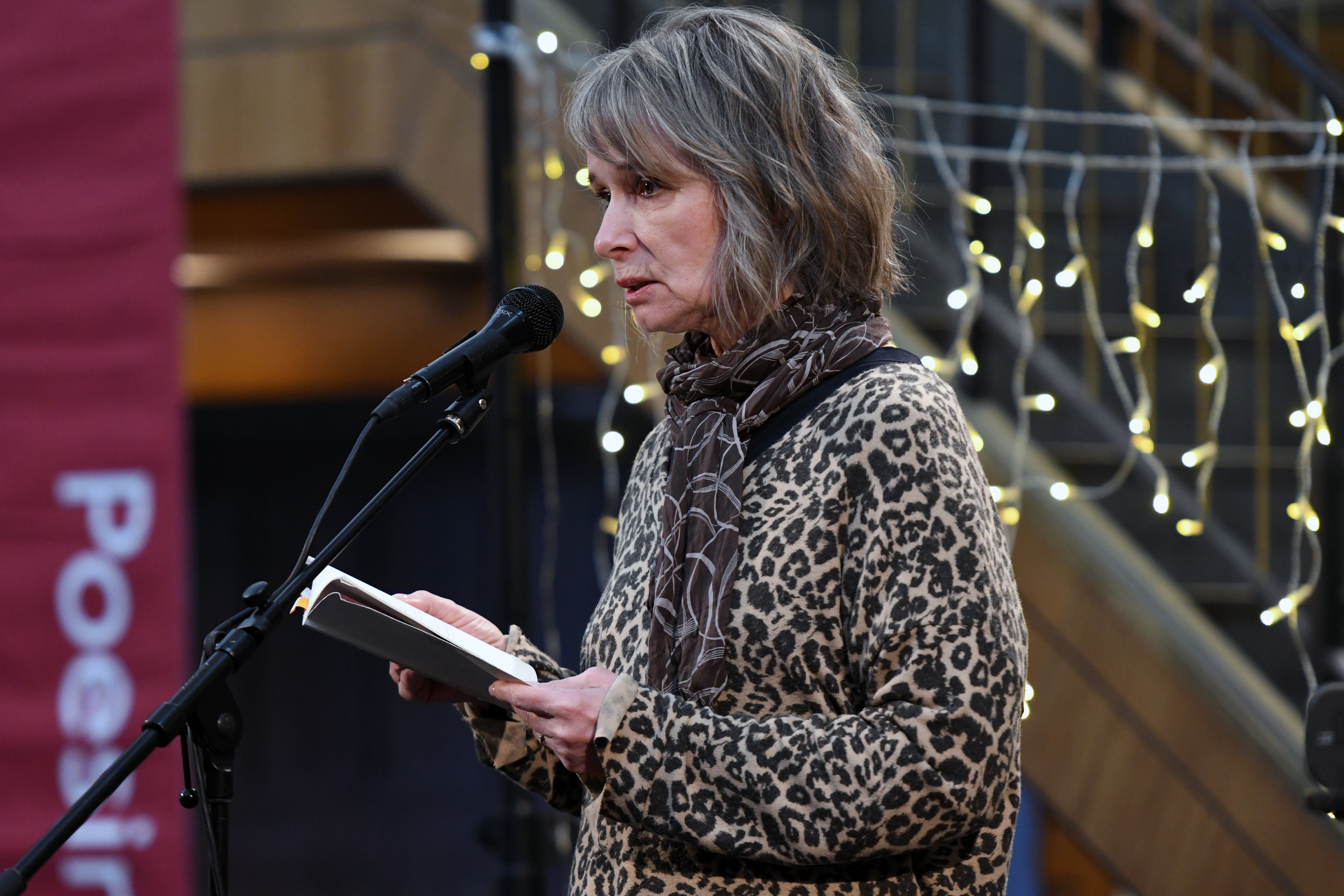
- Linda Vilhjálmsdóttir in Sweden 2019.
- Born: 1 June 1958 (age 66); Reykjavík, Iceland
- Occupation(s): Writer, poet, playwright

Linda Vilhjálmsdóttir (born 1 June 1958) is an Icelandic writer, poet, and playwright.

== Career ==
She was born in Reykjavík, grew up there and still lives there. She works as a nurse part-time. Her poetry began appearing in newspapers in 1982. In 1990 she published her first book of poetry Bláþráður ("Hanging by a thread"). Two of her plays have been performed in Reykjavík. In 2003, she published her first book of prose Lygasaga ("A Story of Lies").

In 1993, Linda received the literary prize awarded by the DV daily newspaper for her poetry collection Klakabörnin ("Ice Children"). Her collection of poetry Frelsi ("Freedom") received the DV literary prize in 2015; it was nominated for the 2017 Nordic Council Literature Prize.

== Collections containing her works translated to English ==
- Poems from The 30th Poetry International Festival Rotterdam
- Poems in Brushstrokes of Blue: The Young Poets of Iceland
- Mona Lisa

"Öll fallegu orðin / Alle schönen Worte. Frostfiðrildin / Frostschmetterlinge: Ljóð / GedichteBernd Koberling (Illustrator), Tina Flecken (Übersetzer), Buchkunst Kleinheinrich, D-Münster; (1. Auflage 1. Oktober 2011) ISBN 978-3930754656
