= Nína Björk Árnadóttir =

Icelandic playwright, poet, and novelist

Nína Björk Árnadóttir (7 June 1941 – 16 April 2000) was an Icelandic playwright, poet, and novelist.

== Life ==
She graduated from Reykjavík Theatre Company Actors Training School in 1965. She studied at University of Copenhagen. In 1989, she was Reykjavík City poet.

== Works ==
- Ævintyrabokin um Alfreð Floka, Forlagið, 1992, ISBN 978-9979-53-196-8
- Engill i snjonum, Iðunn, 1994, ISBN 978-9979-1-0253-3
- Þriðja astin, Iðunn, 1995, ISBN 978-9979-1-0275-5
- Alla leið hingað, Iðunn, 1996, ISBN 978-9979-1-0296-0
