= María Lilja Þrastardóttir =

Icelandic journalist and author (born 1986)

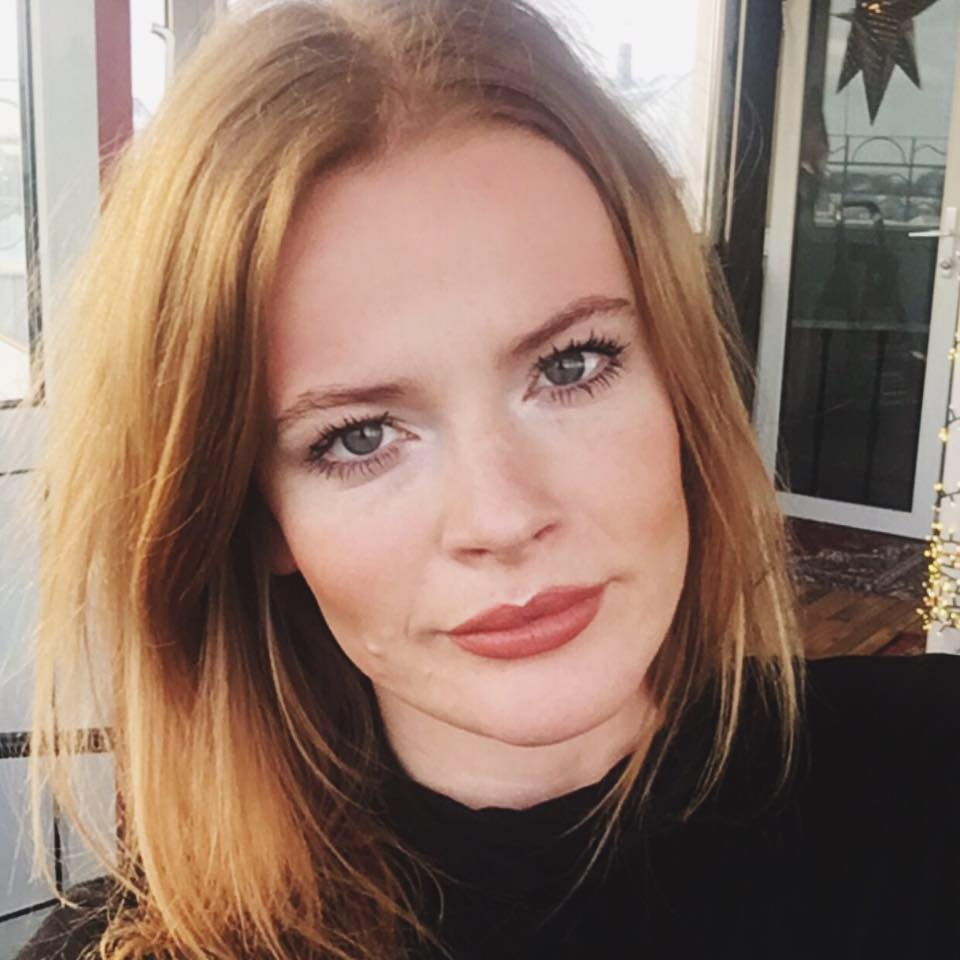
- María Lilja in 2016
- Born: María Lilja Þrastardóttir Kemp; 1 September 1986 (age 39); Reykjavík, Iceland
- Partner: Orri Páll Dýrason (married)

María Lilja Þrastardóttir Kemp (born 1 September 1986) Is an Icelandic politician, student lawyer, journalist, author and activist.

She is married to Orri Páll Dýrason, the former drummer of the band Sigur Rós.
