= Yvonne K. Fulbright =

Icelandic-American sexologist and author

Dr. Yvonne Kristin Fulbright is an Icelandic-American sexologist, author, and television personality.

== Education ==
Originally from Iceland, Yvonne has a Ph.D. from New York University, a Master's in Human Sexuality Education from the University of Pennsylvania, and Bachelor's degrees in psychology and sociology from Penn State University. She went on to pursue a post-doctoral fellowship at the University of Iceland, focusing on sexual health services for young people. She is a certified sexuality educator through the American Association of Sex Educators, Counselors, and Therapists (AASECT).

== Career ==
=== Writing ===
Fulbright started her writing career as the scribe of "Sexpert Tells All" in New York University's Washington Square News. For the last several years, she has been an editor for AASECT's "Contemporary Sexuality", a writer for loveandhealth.ifriends.net, and a volunteer with sexualhealth.com. The former "sexpert" columnist for Foxnews.com and Women's Health, she is now the sex columnist for Cosmopolitan and disaboom.com as well as a member of the Sinclair Institute Advisory Council, for whom she wrote the new book The Better Sex Guide to Extraordinary Lovemaking.

=== Media appearances ===
Fulbright is the sex expert/host for Comcast's Dating on Demand and cherrytv.com. For the last couple of years, she was the co-host of Sirius Maxim Channel 108's Sex Files show. An advocate and activist for sexuality education, she is a sex blogger for The Huffington Post, a freelancer, and a professor at Argosy University. She is frequently interviewed for and featured in national and international publications.

=== Sexuality educator ===
Fulbright founded Sexuality Source, Inc. in 2004, offering consulting, writing, and educational services. She later went on to launch a global sexuality headquarters website, where experts and browsers interact - www.sensualfusion.com.

Yvonne has been a sexuality educator for over a decade, teaching undergraduates and graduate students at the University of Pennsylvania, New York University, and currently at American University. Credited for her sensitivity to diversity, she has been a speaker for the college lecture circuit and organizations, like the American Medical Student Association, speaking on a variety of sex and relationship issues.

== Books ==
Fulbright is the author of 9 books:

- "The Best Ever Oral Sex for Her" (Adams Media, 2011)
- "The Best Ever Oral Sex for Him" (Adams Media, 2011)
- "Sultry Sex Talk to Seduce Any Lover" (Quiver, 2010)
- Sinclair's "The Better Sex Guide to Extraordinary Lovemaking" (Quiver, 2010)
- Pleasuring: The Secrets to Sexual Satisfaction (Hollan, 2008)
- Touch Me There! A Hands-on Guide to Your Orgasmic Hot Spots (Hunter House, 2007)
- Sex with Your Ex & 69 Other Things You Should Never Do Again... Plus a Few that You Should (Adams Media, 2007)
- The Hot Guide to Safer Sex (Hunter House, 2003)

She is also the co-author of Your Orgasmic Pregnancy: Little Sex Secrets Every Hot Mama Should Know (Hunter House, 2008), as well as the writer of 3 "Sensual Fusion Essentials" e-guides on Feng Shui, Reiki, and Energy and Breath. Dr. Fulbright has also produced an audio guide with her cousin, Hermigervill, titled Who Better than You? Educating Your Child about Sex, Love & Relationships.
