= Guðrún Lárusdóttir =

Icelandic writer and politician (1880–1938)

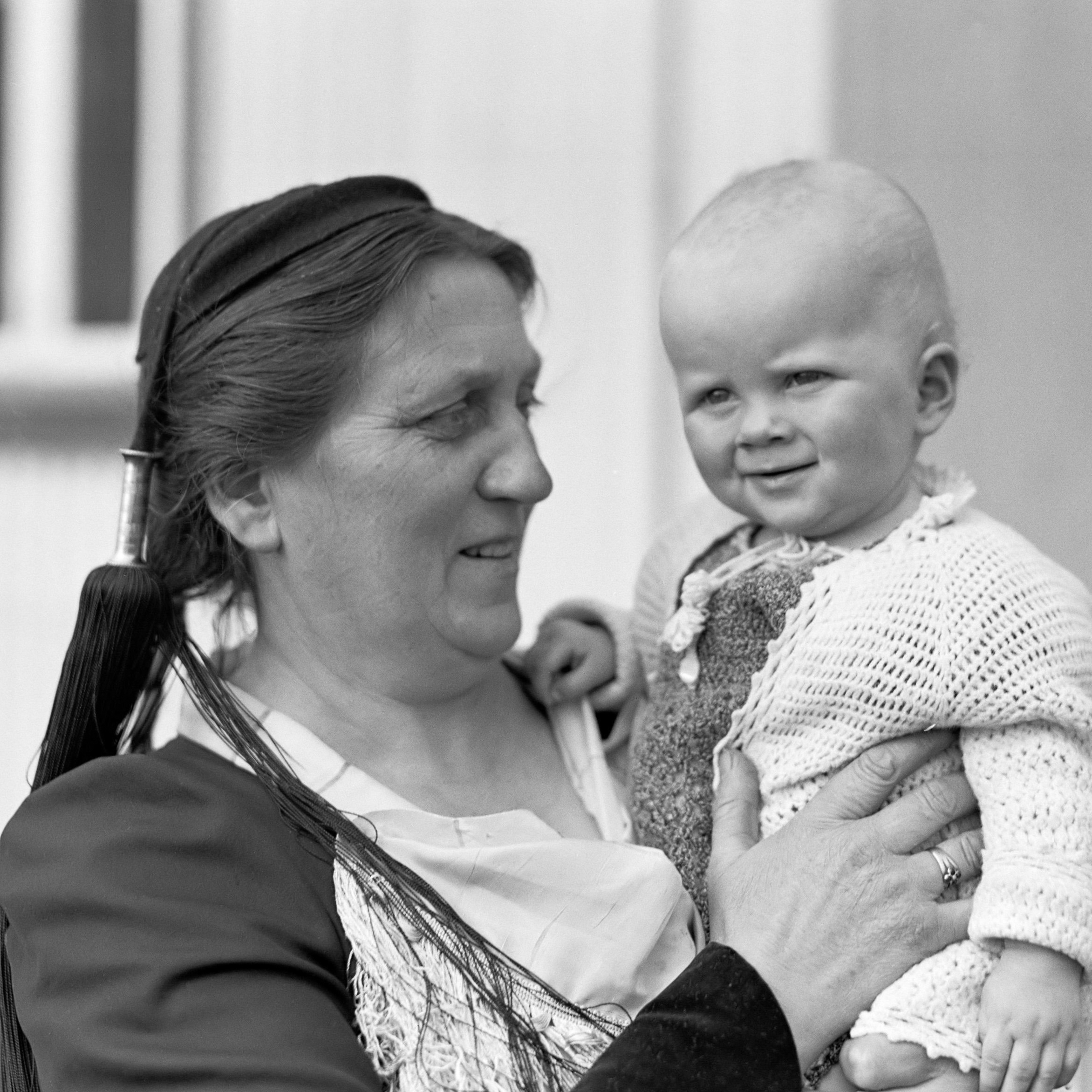
Guðrún holding her grandchild in 1934

Guðrún Lárusdóttir (8 January 1880 – 20 August 1938) was an Icelandic politician, writer and translator. She most notably served two terms as a member of the Althing, the national parliament of Iceland.

== Biography ==
Guðrún was born in Valþjófsstað, Fljótsdalur, the daughter of Lárus Halldórsson (1851–1908), a parliamentarian and priest, and his wife Kirstín Katrín Pétursdóttir Guðjohnsen (1850–1940). At a young age, she wrote about issues regarding women's rights. She also translated works from Danish, English and German to Icelandic. In 1899, she moved to Reykjavík with her family. She published her first novel, a three-part series titled Ljós og skuggar ("Lights and Shadows"), between 1903 and 1905. Guðrún first sat in the town council of Reykjavík between 1912 and 1918. She was elected to the Althing, serving from 1930 to 1934, and was the second woman in the country to be elected to the Althing, after Ingibjörg H. Bjarnason, who became an MP in 1922. In 1934, she became the first woman elected to the Althing for the Independence Party, a position she held until her death.

Guðrún married Sigurbjörn Ástvaldur Gíslason in 1902. They had 10 children – five of whom died in childhood.

On 20 August 1938, Guðrún was killed in a road accident. She was accompanied by her husband and two of their daughters, as well as a driver, when the vehicle they were travelling in plummeted into the Tungufljót river. She died by drowning along with her two daughters, Guðrún and Sigrún. Her husband and the driver managed to escape.

== Publications ==
- Ljós og skuggar : sögur úr daglega lifinu, 1903
- A heimleið skáldsaga úr sveitinni, 1913
- Skáldsaga ur sveitinni., 1913
- Mod hjemmet, 1916
- Sigur : smásaga, 1917
- Tvær smásögur, 1918
- Brúðargjöfin : saga, 1922
- Móðir og barn : eftir sænska móður, 1932
- Þess bera menn sár : skáldsaga, 1935
- Sólargeislinn hans og fleiri smásögur handa börnum og unglingum, 1938
- Systurnar : skáldsaga, 1938
- Á heimleið : Sjónleikur í 4 þáttum eftir samnefndri skáldsögu : Lárus Sigurbjörnsson sneri sögunni í leik, 1939
- Ritsafn Guðrúnar Lárusdóttur : skáldsögur, sögur fyrir unglinga, erindi og hugvekjur., 1949
- Tríggjar smásögur : Umsett úr íslendskum eftir: Sonarfórn. Sönn jólagleði. Jósef, av Victor Danielsen. Kápumynd teknað av Ingálvi av Reyni, 1957
- Smásögur, 1966
- Tríggjar smásögur, 1979
