= Hallgerður Gísladóttir =

Icelandic ethnologist and poet

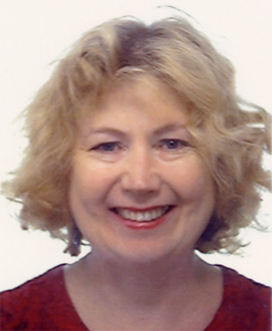
Hallgerður Gísladóttir

Hallgerður Gísladóttir (28 September 1952 – 1 February 2007) was an Icelandic ethnologist and poet. Her specialty was Icelandic food traditions and gastronomy, and Icelandic man-made caves.

== Early life and education ==
Hallgerður was born in Norðfjörður, East Iceland. She studied anthropology and history at the University of Manitoba in Winnipeg from 1974 to 1975. She earned a B.A. in history from the University of Iceland in 1981 and cand. mag. 1991.

== Career ==
Hallgerður worked at the Department of Ethnology in the National Museum of Iceland, became its Head of department in 1995 and later the Ethnological Collections Manager. In 1999, she published a book, Icelandic Food Heritage (Íslensk matarhefð), for which she received scholarly prizes and was also nominated for the Icelandic Literature Prize. On Icelandic man-made caves, she was a co-author of a book, Artificial Caves in Iceland (Manngerðir hellar á Íslandi), published in 1991.

Hallgerður made a series of television programs for Icelandic TV, both on traditional Icelandic food and cooking methods, and on Icelandic Christmas traditions, along with countless programs for Icelandic radio on related subjects. For many years, Hallgerður taught courses on traditional food and cooking in the history and folklore departments of the University of Iceland, presented papers and lectures in Iceland and other countries and published many articles on her subject in both Icelandic and foreign journals.

Hallgerður was a poet and her book of poetry, Into the Light (Í ljós), was published in 2004. She also published single poems in various Icelandic journals. Several were translated and published in the German literary magazine Die Horen in 2006.

Hallgerður was the chairman of The Union of Icelandic Studies (FÍFK) from 1999 to 2001 and the chairman of The Union of Museum Licentiates (FÍSOS) for several years.
