= Guðrún frá Lundi =

Icelandic writer (1887–1975)

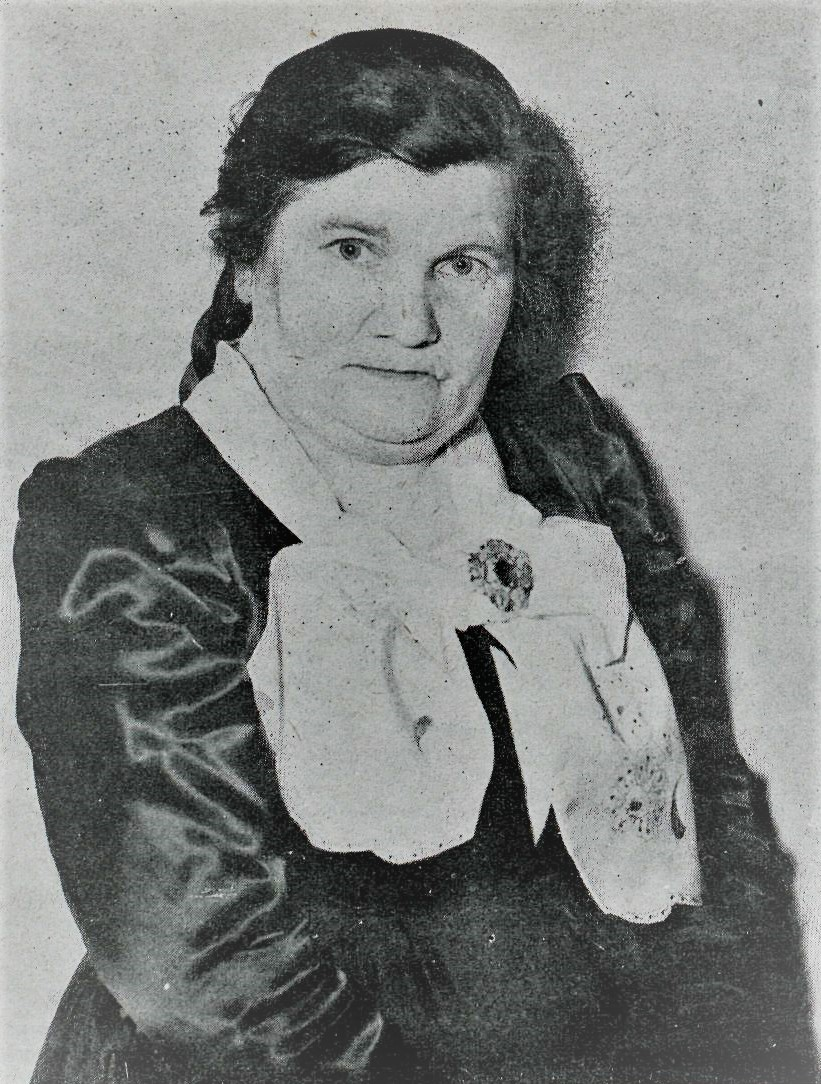
Guðrún Baldvina Árnadóttir, 1952

Guðrún Baldvina Árnadóttir (3 June 1887 – 22 August 1975), known as Guðrún frá Lundi, was an Icelandic writer.

She was born in Lundur, the fourth of the nine children of Árni Magnússon and his wife Baldvina Ásgrímsdóttir, and took up writing as a teenager, living on a farm. Having married a carpenter, had children and moved to Sauðárkrókur before the Second World War, she resumed writing and her first book was finally published in 1946. In her sixties, she became prolific, bringing out a book a year on average, including poetry collections.

Her best known work is the epic novel Dalalíf, published in several volumes and completed in 1952. Her stories mostly have a rural setting and deal with the lives of the kind of farming community where she grew up. Her books were immensely popular until the 1960s, when Icelandic culture and the Icelandic language became unfashionable, but enjoyed a resurgence in the last decade of her life.

== Works ==
- Dalalíf, 1946–1951, 5 volumes (1: Æskuleikir og ástir; 2: Alvara og sorgir; 3: Tæpar leiðir; 4: Laun syndarinnar; 5: Logn að kvöldi).
- Afdalabarn, 1950.
- Tengdadóttirin, 1952–1954, 3 volumes (1: Á krossgötum; 2: Hrundar vörður; 3: Sæla sveitarinnar).
- Þar sem brimaldan brotnar, 1955.
- Römm er sú taug, 1956.
- Ölduföll, 1957.
- Svíður sárt brenndum, 1958.
- Á ókunnum slóðum, 1959.
- Í heimahögum, 1960.
- Stýfðar fjaðrir (3 volumes), 1961–1963.
- Hvikul er konuást, 1964.
- Sólmánaðardagar í Sellandi, 1965.
- Dregur ský fyrir sól, 1966.
- Náttmálaskin, 1967.
- Gulnuð blöð, 1968.
- Utan frá sjó (4 volumes), 1970–1973.
