= Þórunn Elfa Magnúsdóttir =

Icelandic writer (1910–1995)

Þórunn Elfa Magnúsdóttir (20 July 1910 – 26 February 1995) was an Icelandic writer.

The daughter of Magnús Magnússon and Margét Magnúsdóttir, she was born in Reykjavík and was sent to live with her aunt and uncle in northern Iceland when she was six. She had to leave school because of tuberculosis. She later attended college in Drammen and Ósló, and university in Uppsala. She published her first work, a trilogy of novels Dætur Reykjavíkur I-III in 1933, 1934 and 1938.

She was active in the Icelandic Women's Rights Association and was also involved in writers' associations.

She married Jóni Þórðarsyn, a professor and author; the couple had two sons and a daughter.

== Selected works ==
- Að Sólbakka, novel (1937)
- Snorrabraut 7, novel (1947)
- Sambýlisfólk, novel (1954)
- Frostnótt í maí, novel (1958)
