= Iceland College of Education =

Former college in Reykjavík, Iceland

Coordinates: 64°8′12.73″N 21°54′9.31″W

Iceland University of Education
- Kennaraháskóli Íslands
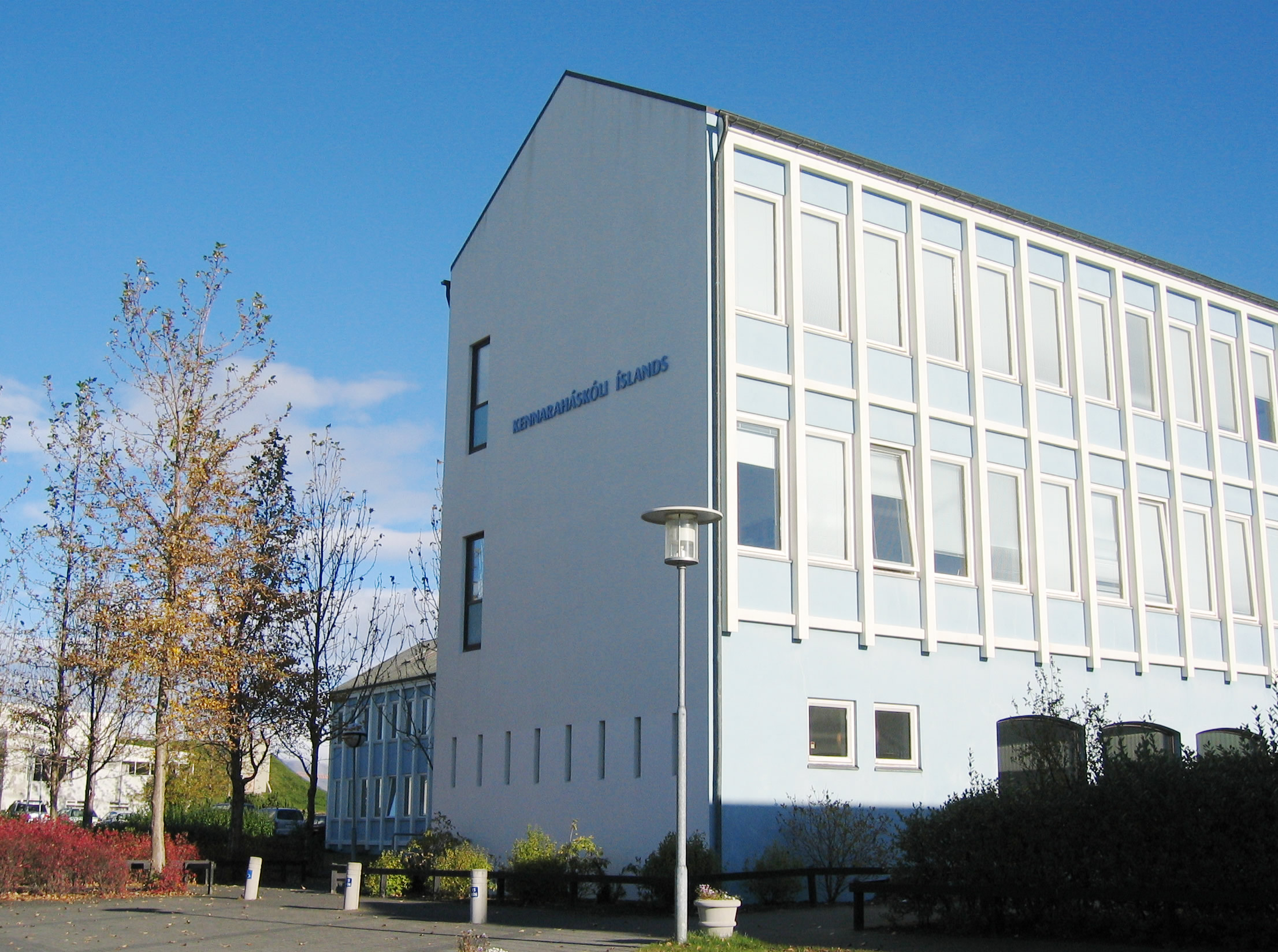
- Type: Public, normal school
- Established: 1907
- Location: Reykjavík, Iceland
- Successor: University of Iceland

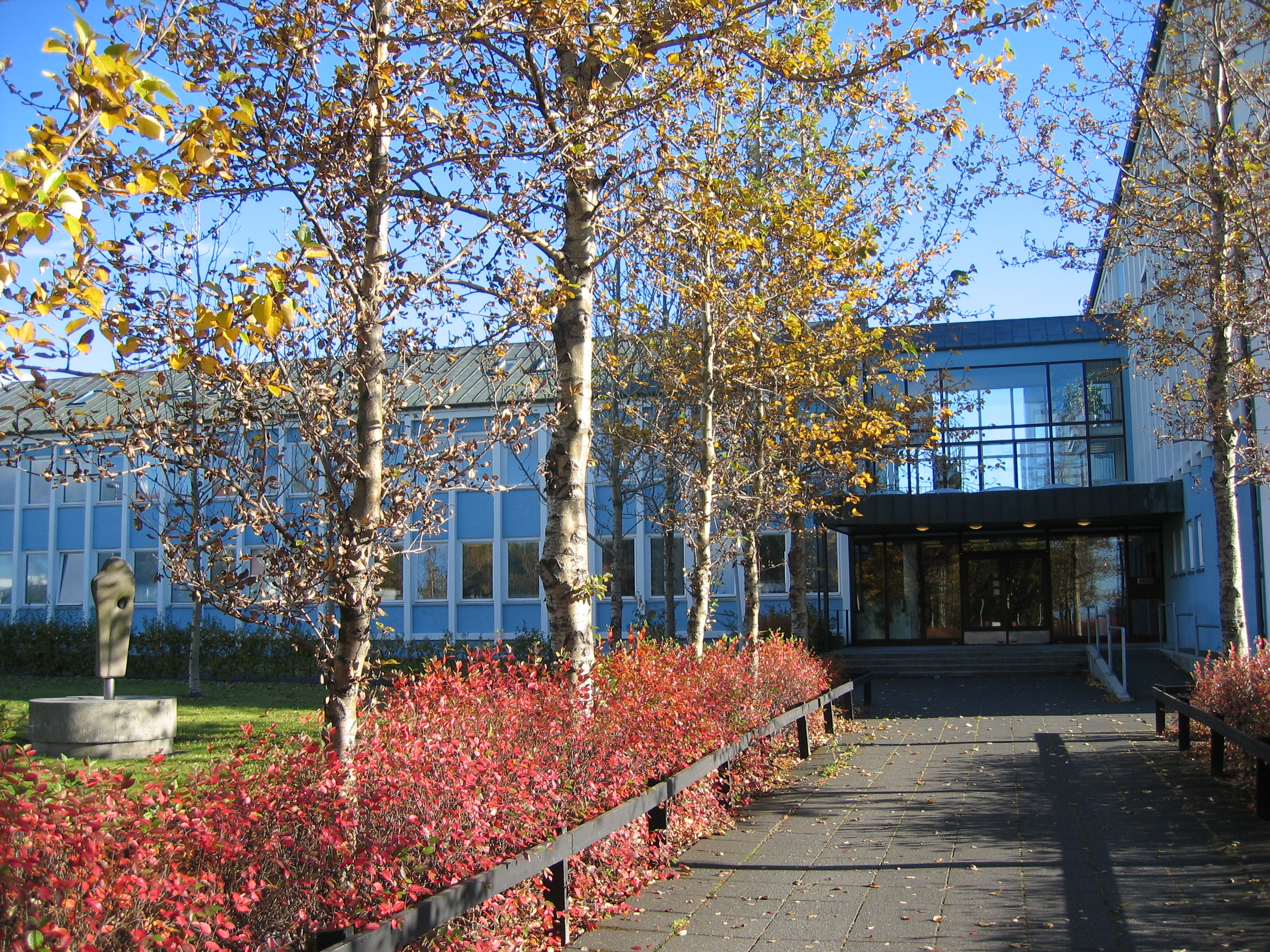
Entrance

Iceland College of Education was a normal college in Iceland. It merged with the University of Iceland in July 2008 and is now called the School of Education. Enrollment was around 2300 students with more than half of them being distance learning students. The university offered B.A., Bf B Ed. and B.S degree programmes as well as M.Ed. and doctorate degrees.

The main campus is located in Reykjavík. The main building is at Stakkahlid and the art department is nearby at Skipholt 37. The division of Sport and Physical Education is located at Laugarvatn campus in the south of Iceland, approximately 90 kilometres from Reykjavík.
