= List of people from Reykjavík =

List of notable people who were born in or have lived in Reykjavík, Iceland

Coat of Arms of Reykjavík

This is a list of notable people who were born or have lived in Reykjavík, Iceland.

== Born in Reykjavík ==
=== 19th century ===
- Jóhann Gunnar Sigurðsson (1882–1906), poet
- Sigurjón Pétursson (1888–1955), wrestler
- Tryggvi Þórhallsson (1889–1935), Prime Minister of Iceland from 1927 to 1932
- Jóhannes Gunnarsson (1897–1972), prelate of the Roman Catholic Church
- Engel Lund (1900–1996), Danish-Icelandic soprano

=== 20th century ===
==== 1901–1940 ====
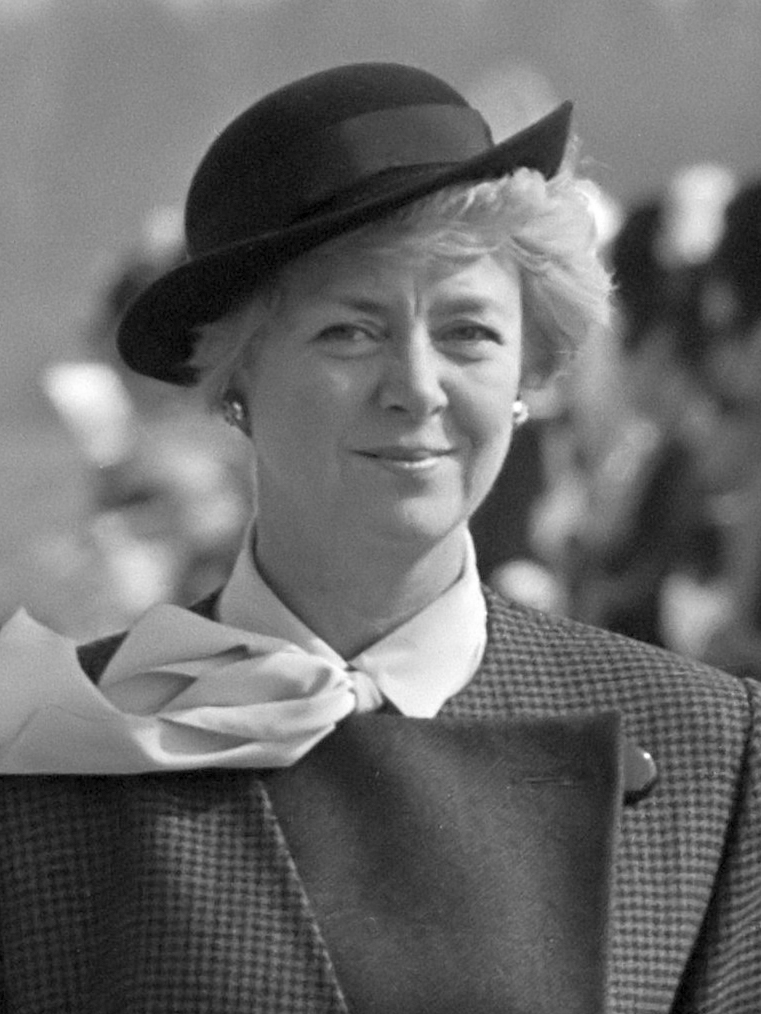
Vigdís Finnbogadóttir (born 1930)

- Ólafía Einarsdóttir (1924–2017), first Icelander to earn a degree in archaeology.
- Margrét Þorbjörg Thors Hallgrímsson (1902–1996), matriarch of one of the most powerful families in Iceland in the twentieth century
- Halldór Laxness (1902–1998), writer
- Bjarni Benediktsson (1908–1970), leader in the independence movement in Iceland
- Gunnar Thoroddsen (1910–1983), Prime Minister of Iceland from 1980 to 1983
- Baldur Möller (1914–1999), chess master
- Áskell Löve (1916–1994), botanist
- Louisa Matthíasdóttir (1917–2000), Icelandic-American painter
- Jórunn Viðar (1918–2017), pianist and composer
- Þorbjörg Pálsdóttir (1919–2009), sculptor
- Drífa Viðar (1920–1971), writer, artist and educator
- Albert Guðmundsson (1923–1994), first Icelandic professional football player
- Geir Hallgrímsson (1925–1990), Prime Minister of Iceland (1974–1978) and mayor of Reykjavík (1959–1972)
- Jón Nordal (1926-2024), composer and pianist
- Haukur Clausen (1928–2003), Olympic athlete
- Örn Clausen (1928–2008), athlete
- Steingrímur Hermannsson (1928–2010), politician
- Magnus Magnusson (1929–2007), journalist, translator, writer and television presenter
- Vigdís Finnbogadóttir (born 1930), President of Iceland from 1980 to 1996
- Margrét Þóra Hallgrímsson (1930–2020), wife of the businessman Björgólfur Guðmundsson
- Jón Gunnar Árnason (1931–1989), sculptor
- Friðrik Ólafsson (1935–2025), chess grandmaster
- Jón Kristinsson (born 1936), Dutch architect
- Álfrún Gunnlaugsdóttir (1938–2021), writer
- Ragnar Stefánsson (1938–2024), seismologist and Professor of the University of Akureyri
- Atli Heimir Sveinsson (1938–2019), composer
- Þorkell Sigurbjörnsson (1938–2013), composer

==== 1941–1950 ====
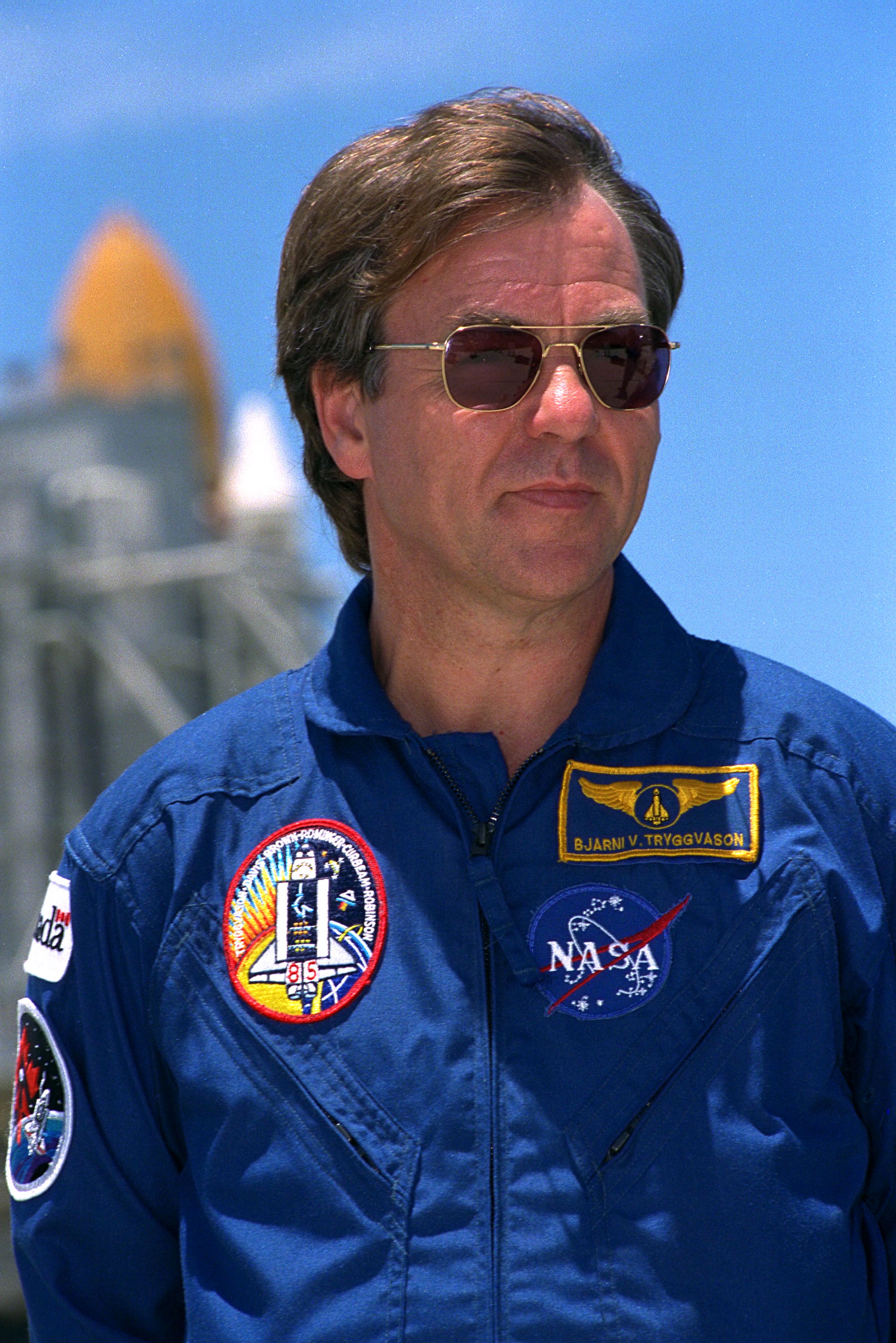
Bjarni Tryggvason (1945–2022)

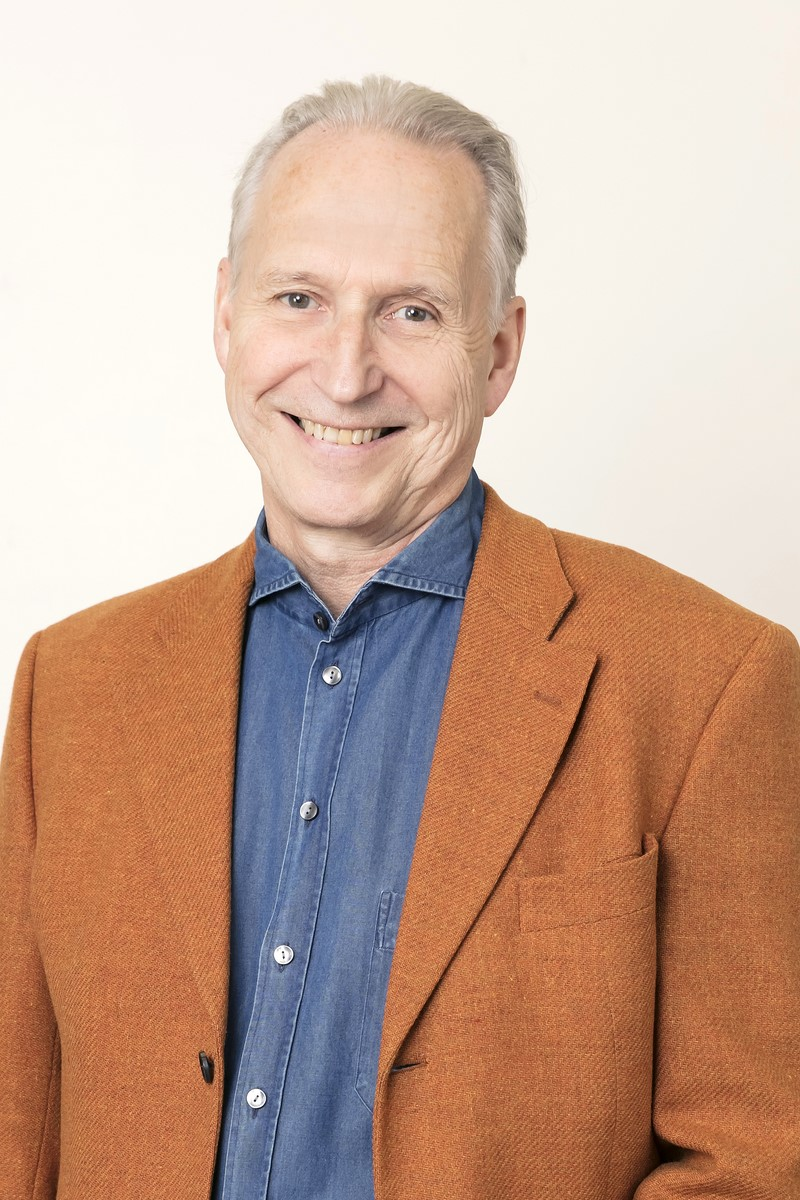
Ari Trausti Guðmundsson (born 1948)

- Björgólfur Guðmundsson (born 1941), chairman and former owner of West Ham United FC
- María Guðmundsdóttir (born 1942), filmmaker, photographer and actress
- Jóhanna Sigurðardóttir (born 1942), politician
- Markús Örn Antonsson (born 1943), Mayor of Reykjavík from 1991 to 1994
- Friðrik Klemenz Sophusson (born 1943), politician and company director
- Þorgerður Ingólfsdóttir (born 1943), choral conductor
- Björn Bjarnason (born 1944), politician
- Pétur Blöndal (1944–2015), politician
- Gunnar Kvaran (born 1944), cellist
- Guðmundur Gunnarsson (born 1945), electrician and union leader
- Einar Hákonarson (born 1945), artist
- Rut Ingólfsdóttir (born 1945), violinist
- Bjarni Tryggvason (1945–2022), Canadian engineer and astronaut
- Jakob Yngvason (born 1945), physicist
- Ágúst Guðmundsson (born 1947), film director and screenwriter
- Gunnar Hansen (1947–2015), Icelandic-American actor
- Þórður Helgason (born 1947), writer and educationalist
- Ólafur Haukur Símonarson (born 1947), playwright and novelist
- Karl Sigurbjörnsson (born 1947), Lutheran bishop of Iceland
- Guðmundur Sigurjónsson (born 1947), chess grandmaster
- Þuríður Backman (born 1948), politician
- Anna Svanhildur Björnsdóttir (born 1948), writer and educator
- Elmar Geirsson (born 1948), footballer
- Ari Trausti Guðmundsson (born 1948), geologist, author, documentarian, broadcaster, journalist, mountaineer and explorer
- Ólafur Gunnarsson (born 1948), author and translator
- Hrafn Gunnlaugsson (born 1948), film director
- Ögmundur Jónasson (born 1948), politician
- Davíð Oddsson (born 1948), politician and the longest-serving prime minister of Iceland
- Ásta Ragnheiður Jóhannesdóttir (born 1949), politician
- Þórarinn Eldjárn (born 1949), writer
- Ágústína Jónsdóttir (born 1949), writer, artist and educator
- Kristenn Einarsson (born 1950), Icelandic-Norwegian publisher
- Steinunn Sigurðardóttir (born 1950), poet and novelist
- Árni Þórarinsson (born 1950), writer

==== 1951–1960 ====
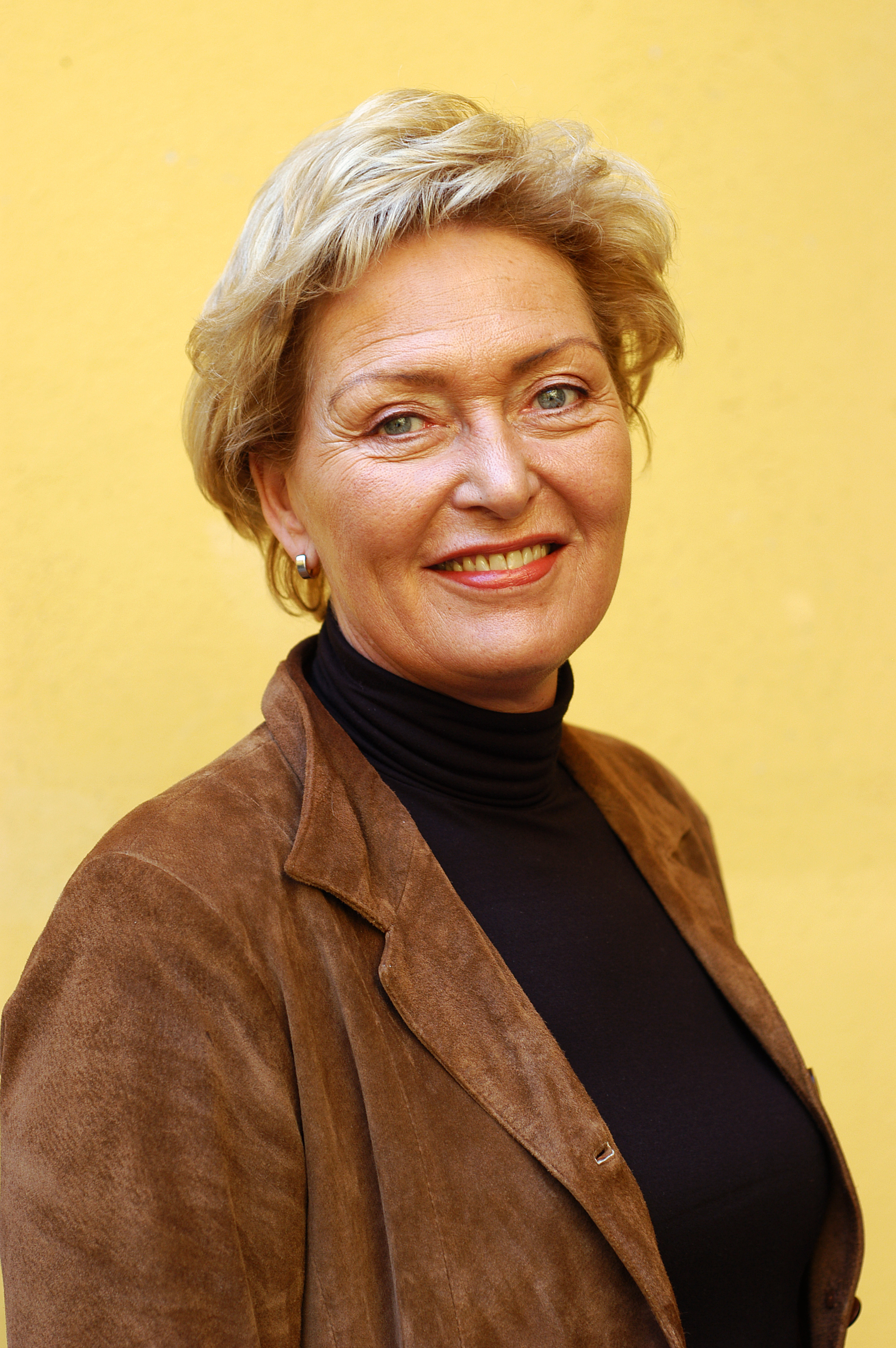
Jónína Bjartmarz (born 1952)

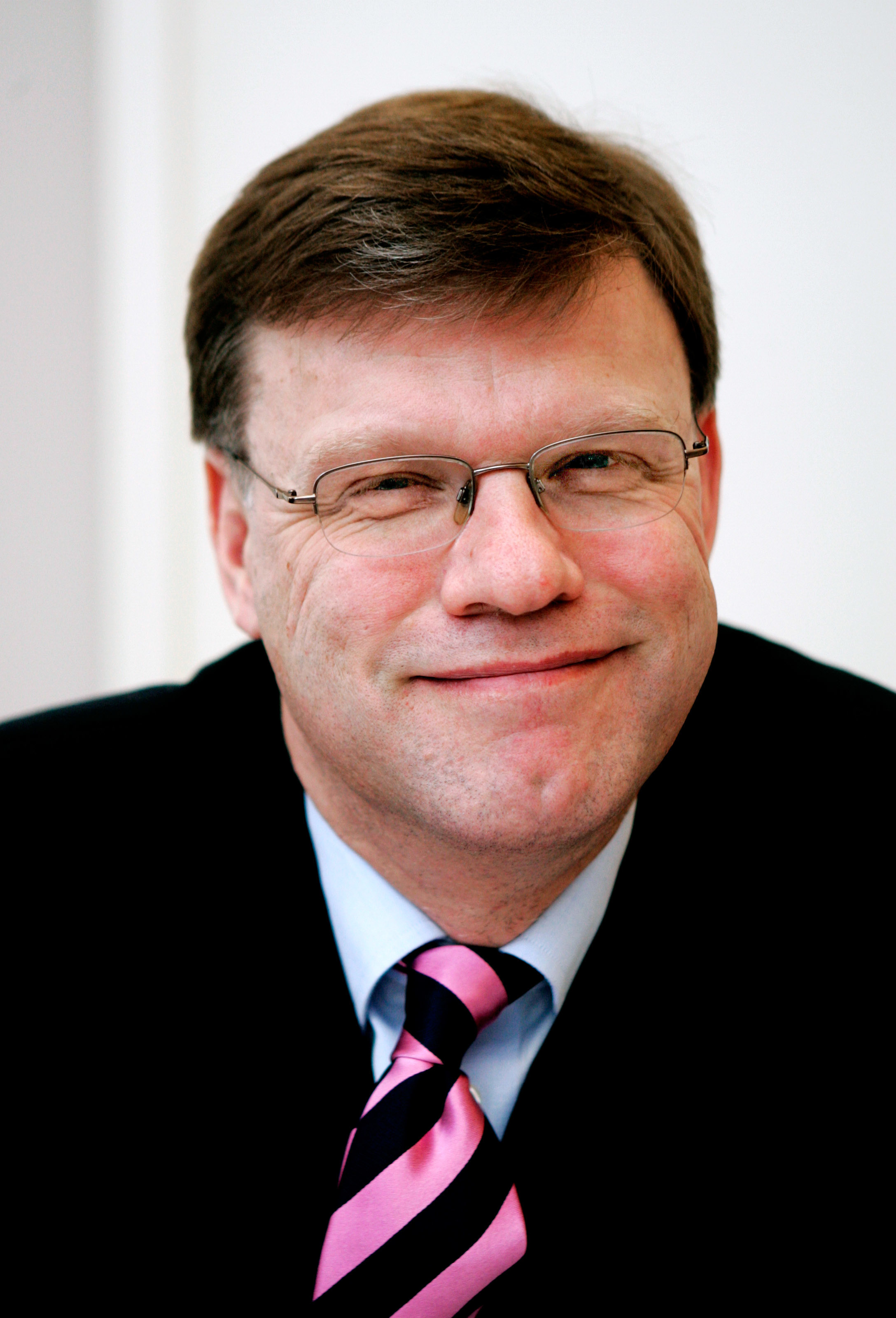
Árni Mathiesen (born 1958)

- Sturla Gunnarsson (born 1951), Canadian film director
- Geir Haarde (born 1951), politician
- Jónína Bjartmarz (born 1952), politician
- Edda Björgvinsdóttir (born 1952), actress, comedian, writer, director and motivational speaker
- Sigurjón Sighvatsson (born 1952), film producer and businessman
- Herbert Guðmundsson (born 1953), pop music singer-songwriter
- Össur Skarphéðinsson (born 1953), politician
- Friðrik Þór Friðriksson (born 1954), film director
- Ingibjörg Sólrún Gísladóttir (born 1954), politician
- Einar Már Guðmundsson (born 1954), author of novels, short stories and poetry
- Jónína Leósdóttir (born 1954), novelist, playwright
- Logi Ólafsson (born 1954), football coach
- Kolbrún Halldórsdóttir (born 1955), politician
- Einar Kárason (born 1955), writer
- Jón Gunnarsson (born 1956), politician
- Bubbi Morthens (born 1956), singer-songwriter
- Helgi Ólafsson (born 1956), chess grandmaster
- Halldór Guðmundsson (born 1956), author
- Ragnheiður Bragadóttir (born 1956), law professor
- Atli Eðvaldsson (born 1957), footballer
- Hans Jóhannsson (born 1957), violin maker
- Sigurður Gylfi Magnússon (born 1957), historian
- Páll Guðlaugsson (born 1958), footballer and football coach
- Jóhannes Helgason (born 1958), guitar player
- Hilmar Örn Hilmarsson (born 1958), musician
- Elísabet Jökulsdóttir (born 1958), author and journalist
- Árni Mathiesen (born 1958), politician
- Auður Ava Ólafsdóttir (born 1958), professor of art history, novelist, playwright and poet
- Kjartan Ólafsson (born 1958), musicologist, composer
- Eiríkur Hauksson (born 1959), heavy metal vocalist
- Hallgrímur Helgason (born 1959), painter, novelist, translator and columnist
- Æsa Sigurjónsdóttir (born 1959), art curator
- Jón Loftur Árnason (born 1960), chess grandmaster
- Jón Atli Benediktsson (born 1960), President of the Governing Council and Rector of the University of Iceland
- Sigurður Einarsson (born 1960), economist, businessman
- Guðmundur Guðmundsson (born 1960), handball player
- Margeir Pétursson (born 1960), banker and chess grandmaster
- Hannes Sigurðsson (born 1960), art historian

==== 1961–1965 ====
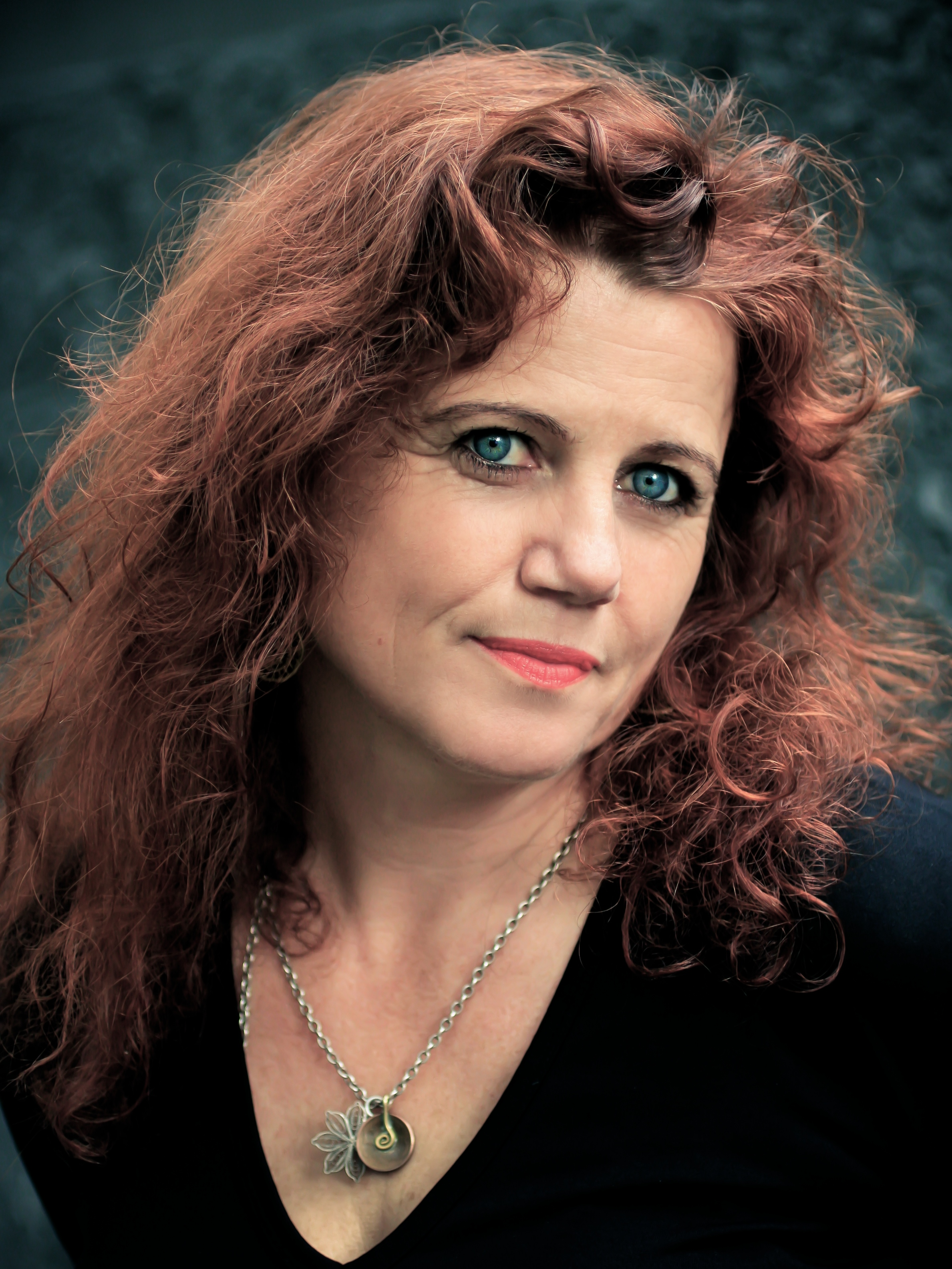
Kristín Helga Gunnarsdóttir (born 1963)

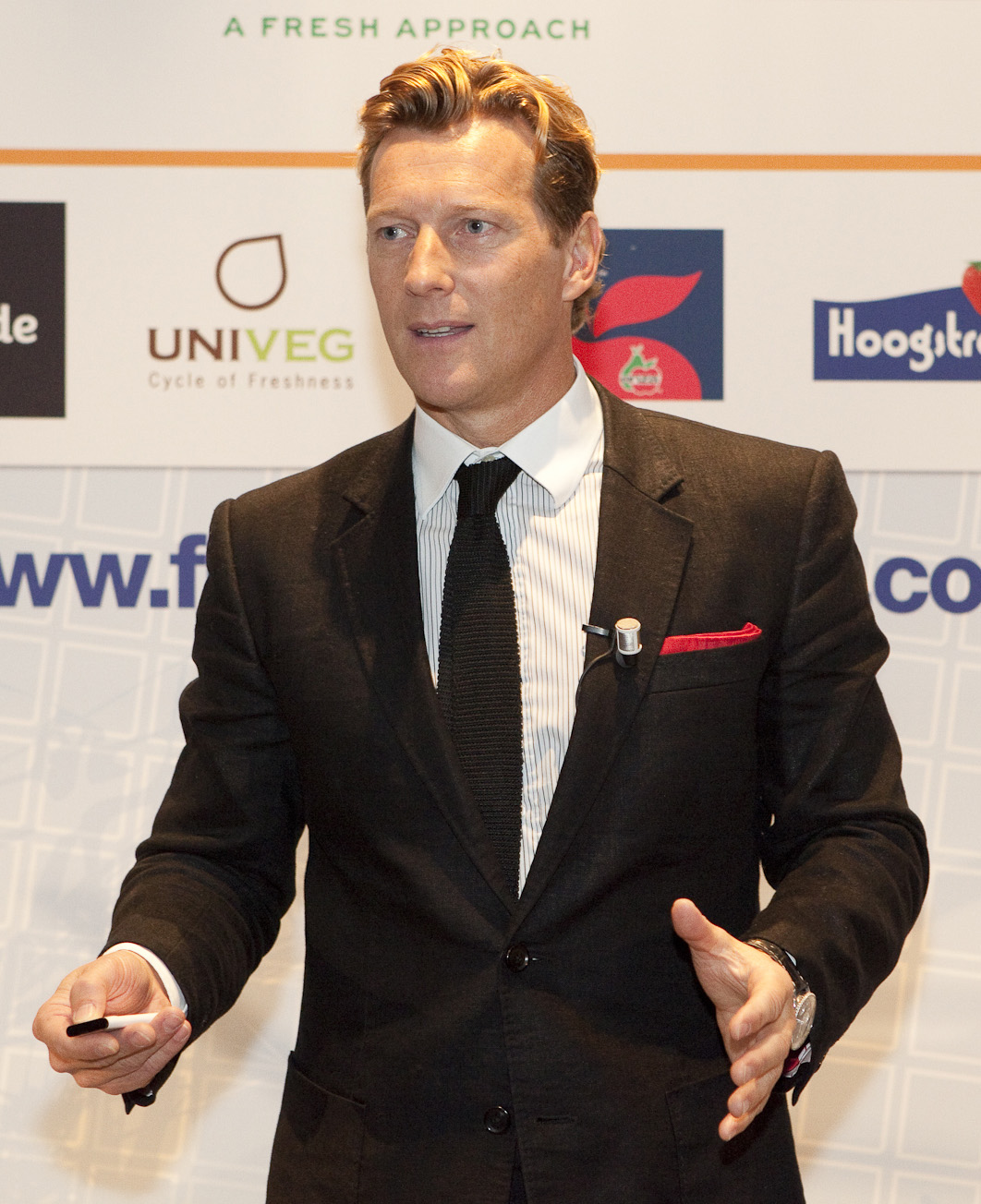
Magnús Scheving (born 1964)

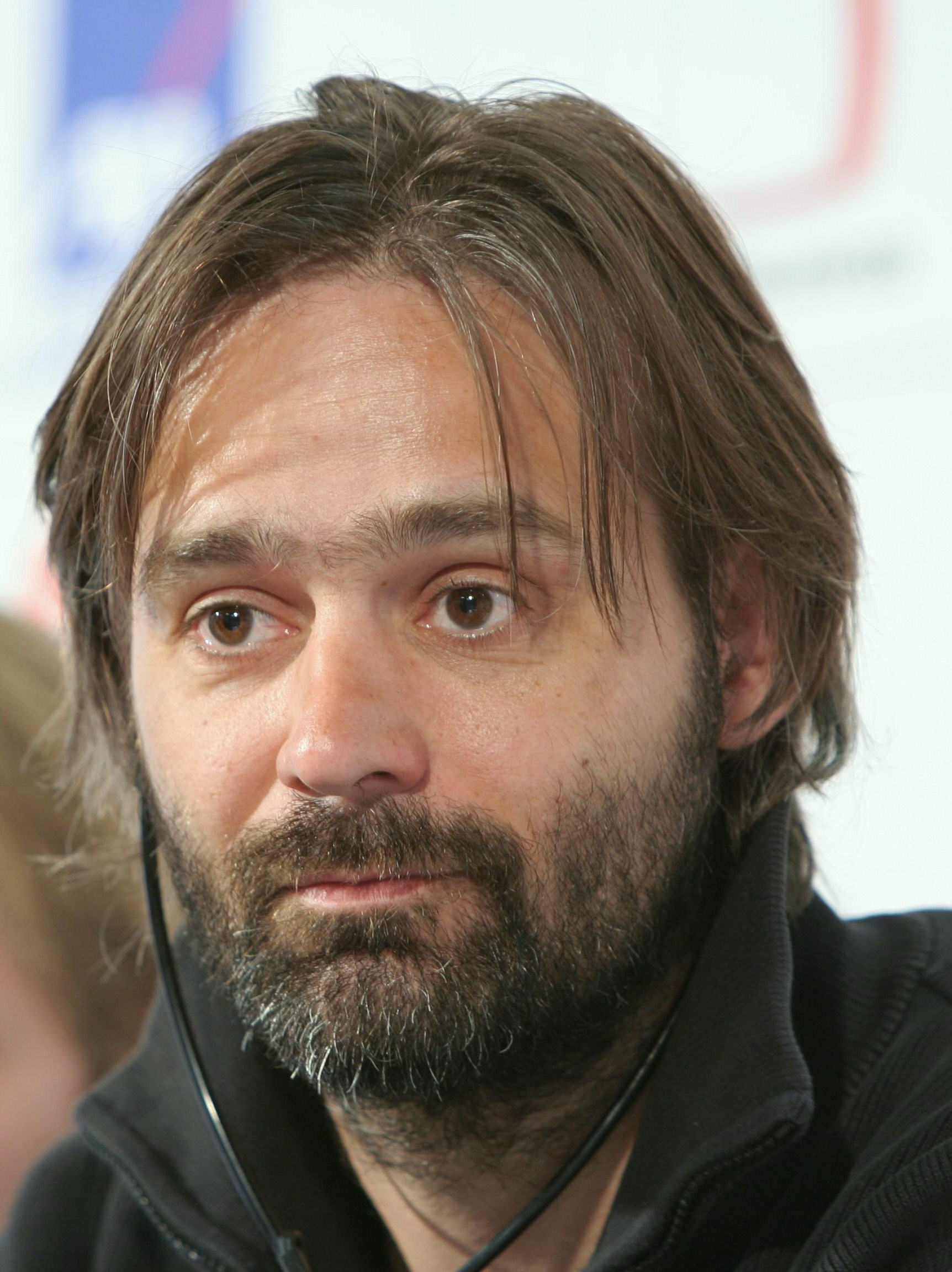
Baltasar Kormákur (born 1966)

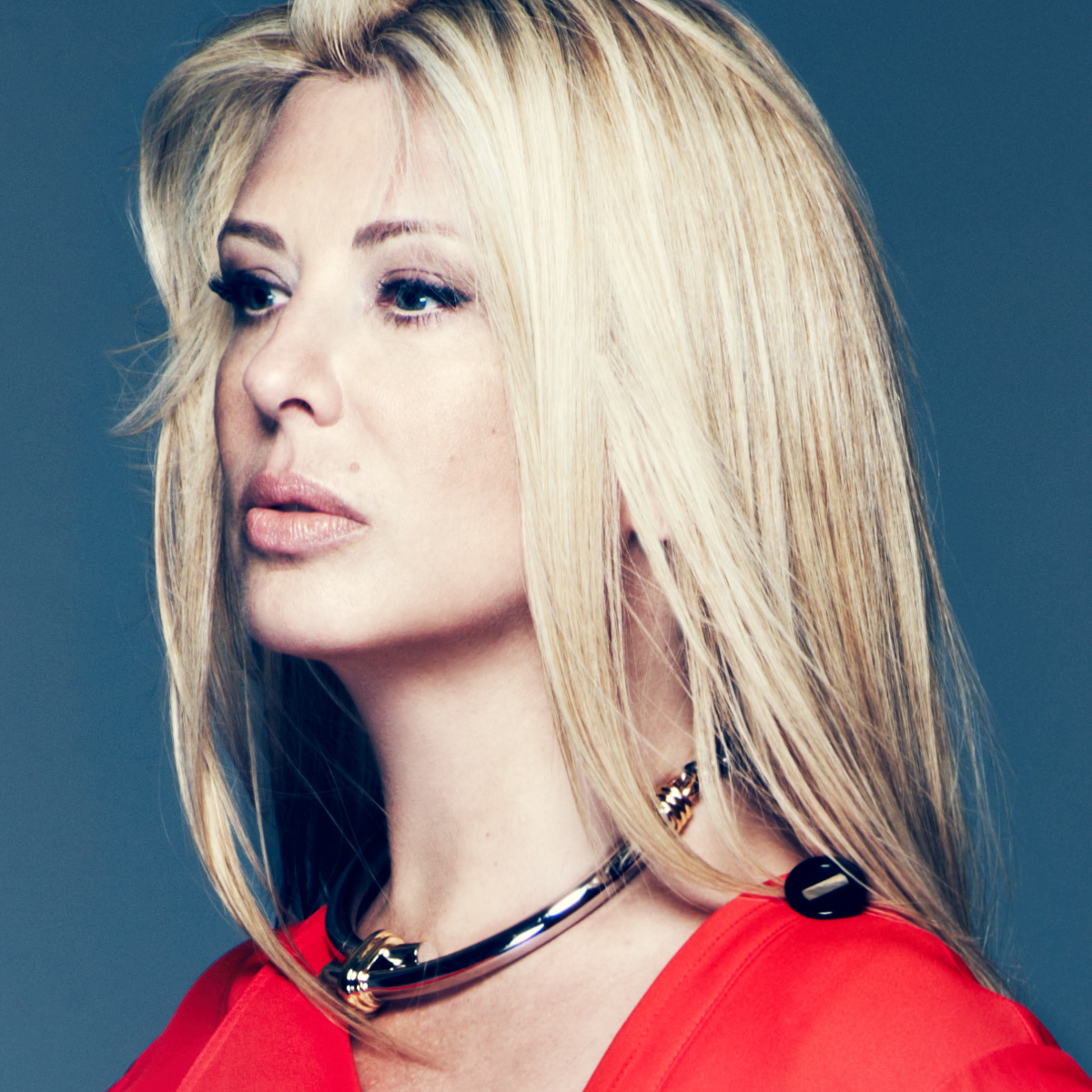
Áslaug Magnúsdóttir (born 1967)

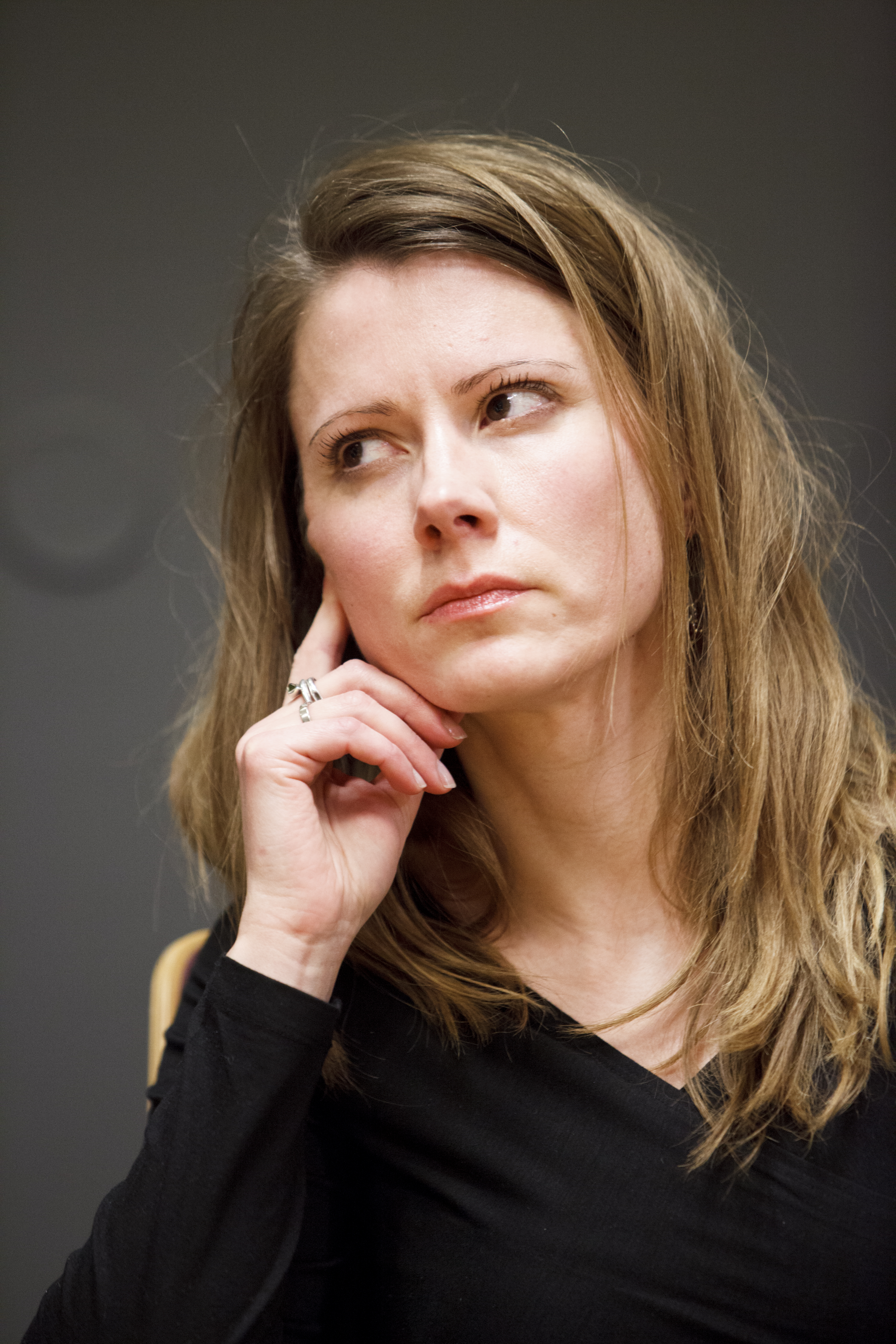
Gerður Kristný (born 1970)

- Arnaldur Indriðason (born 1961), writer of crime fiction
- Gyrðir Elíasson (born 1961), author and translator
- Arnór Guðjohnsen (born 1961), footballer
- Lárus Guðmundsson (born 1961), footballer
- Einar Örn Benediktsson (born 1962), singer
- Ólafía Hrönn Jónsdóttir (born 1962), actress
- Bragi Ólafsson (born 1962), musician and writer
- Ólafur Jóhann Ólafsson (born 1962), businessman, writer and scientist
- Kristín Ómarsdóttir (born 1962), poet and writer
- Ásbjörn Óttarsson (born 1962), politician
- Sjón (born 1962), poet, novelist and lyricist
- Kristín Helga Gunnarsdóttir (born 1963), children's writer, columnist and novelist
- Logi Gunnarsson (born 1963), philosopher
- Jóhann Hjartarson (born 1963), chess grandmaster
- Óskar Jónasson (born 1963), film director and screenwriter
- Ingvar Eggert Sigurðsson (born 1963), actor
- Jón Kalman Stefánsson (born 1963), author
- Halla Margrét Árnadóttir (born 1964), singer
- Snorri Magnússon (born 1964), head of the Icelandic Association of Police Officers
- Magnús Scheving (born 1964), writer, entrepreneur, producer, actor and athlete
- Bjarni Bjarnason (born 1965), writer
- Björk (born 1965), singer-songwriter, actress, record producer and DJ
- Þorgerður Katrín Gunnarsdóttir (born 1965), politician
- Steinunn Valdís Óskarsdóttir (born 1965), politician and mayor of Reykjavík from 2004 to 2006
- María Sólrún Sigurðardóttir (born 1965), German film director
- Þórunn Sveinbjarnardóttir (born 1965), politician

==== 1966–1970 ====
- Ragna Árnadóttir (born 1966), lawyer and politician
- Árni Páll Árnason (born 1966), politician
- Eagle Egilsson (born 1966), television director and cinematographer
- Hilmar Jensson (born 1966), guitarist
- Baltasar Kormákur (born 1966), actor, theater and film director
- Ólöf Nordal (1966–2017), politician
- Skúli Sverrisson (born 1966), composer and bass guitarist
- Björgólfur Thor Björgólfsson (born 1967), businessman and entrepreneur
- Jón Gnarr (born 1967), actor, comedian and politician
- Erla S. Haraldsdóttir (born 1967), visual artist
- Helgi Hjörvar (born 1967), politician
- Áslaug Magnúsdóttir (born 1967), business woman and entrepreneur
- Guðlaugur Þór Þórðarson (born 1967), politician
- Katrín Sigurdardóttir (born 1967), artist
- Jon Stephenson von Tetzchner (born 1967), programmer and businessman
- Guðni Th. Jóhannesson (born 1968), President of Iceland since 2016
- Hermann Stefánsson (born 1968), writer, musician and poet
- Halla Tómasdóttir (born 1968), business person and public speaker
- Ármann Þorvaldsson (born 1968), UK CEO of Kaupthing Bank
- Hilmir Snær Guðnason (born 1969), actor and voice actor
- Jóhann Jóhannsson (born 1969), composer
- Rúnar Kristinsson (born 1969), footballer
- Ásta Kristjana Sveinsdóttir (born 1969), philosopher
- Steinunn Ólína Þorsteinsdóttir (born 1969), actress, TV host, producer and writer
- Bjarni Benediktsson (born 1970), politician
- Gerður Kristný (born 1970), poet
- Anna Mjöll (born 1970), jazz singer-songwriter
- Paul Oscar (born 1970), pop singer-songwriter and disc jockey

==== 1971–1975 ====
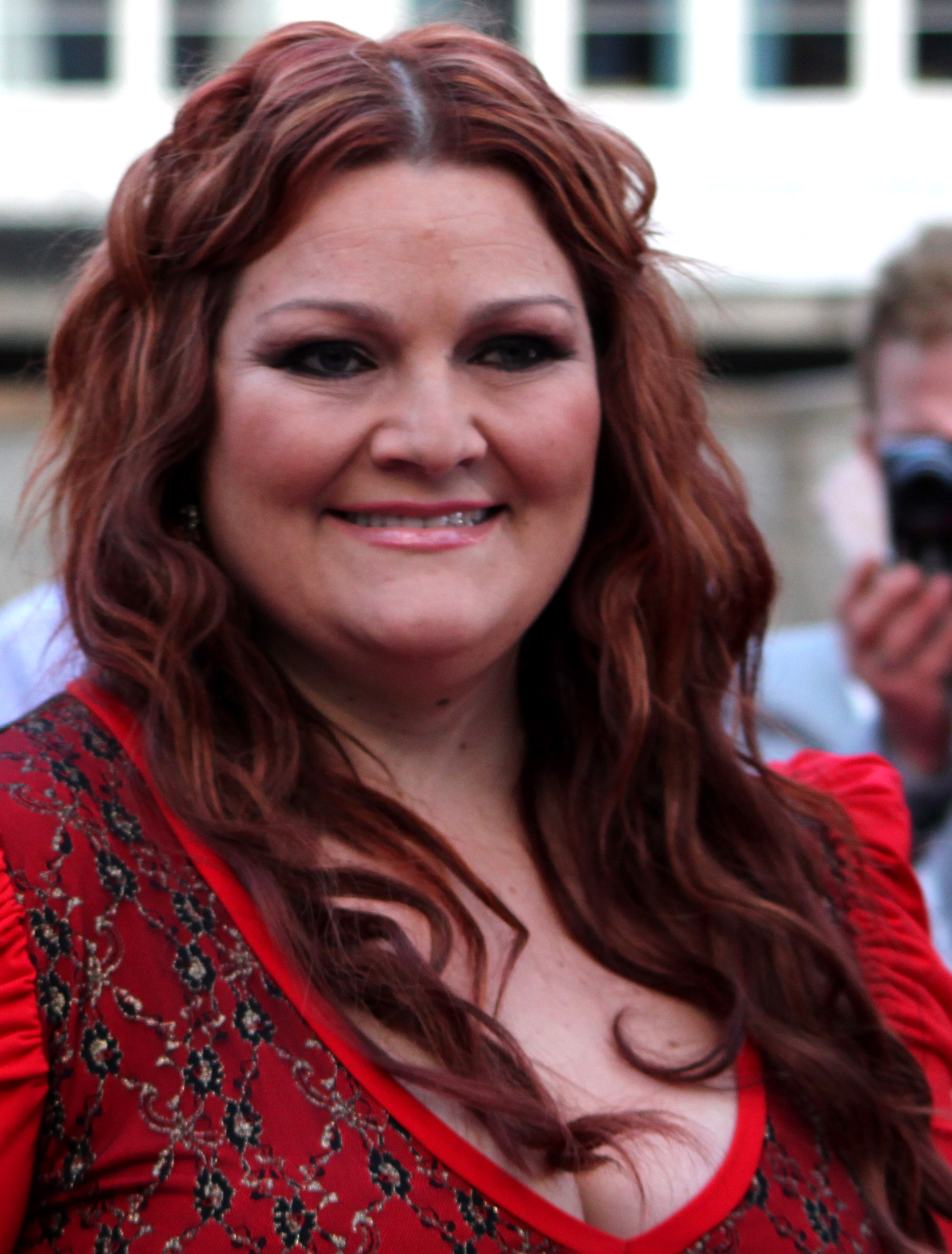
Hera Björk (born 1972)

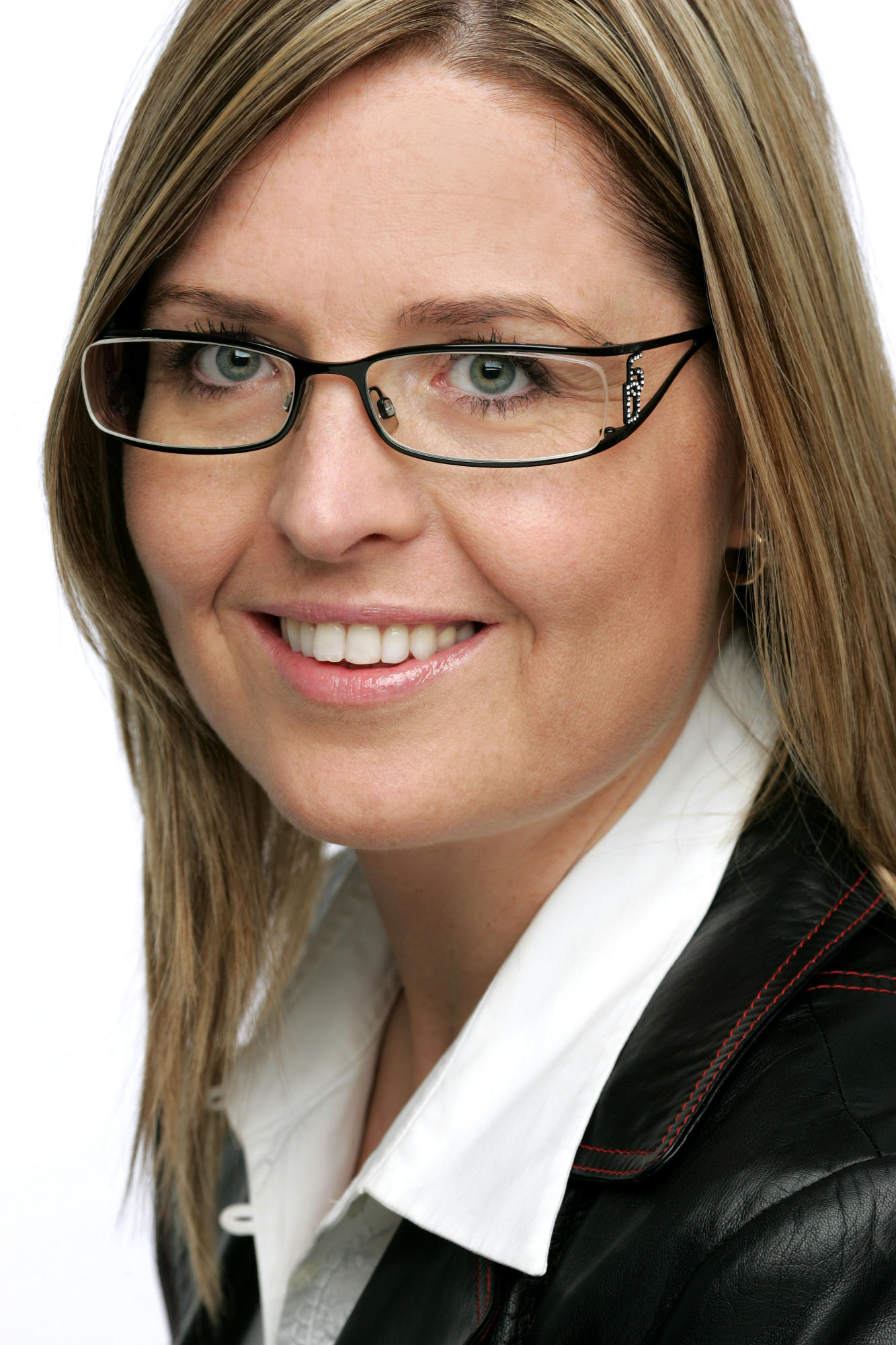
Steinunn Kristín Þórðardóttir (born 1972)

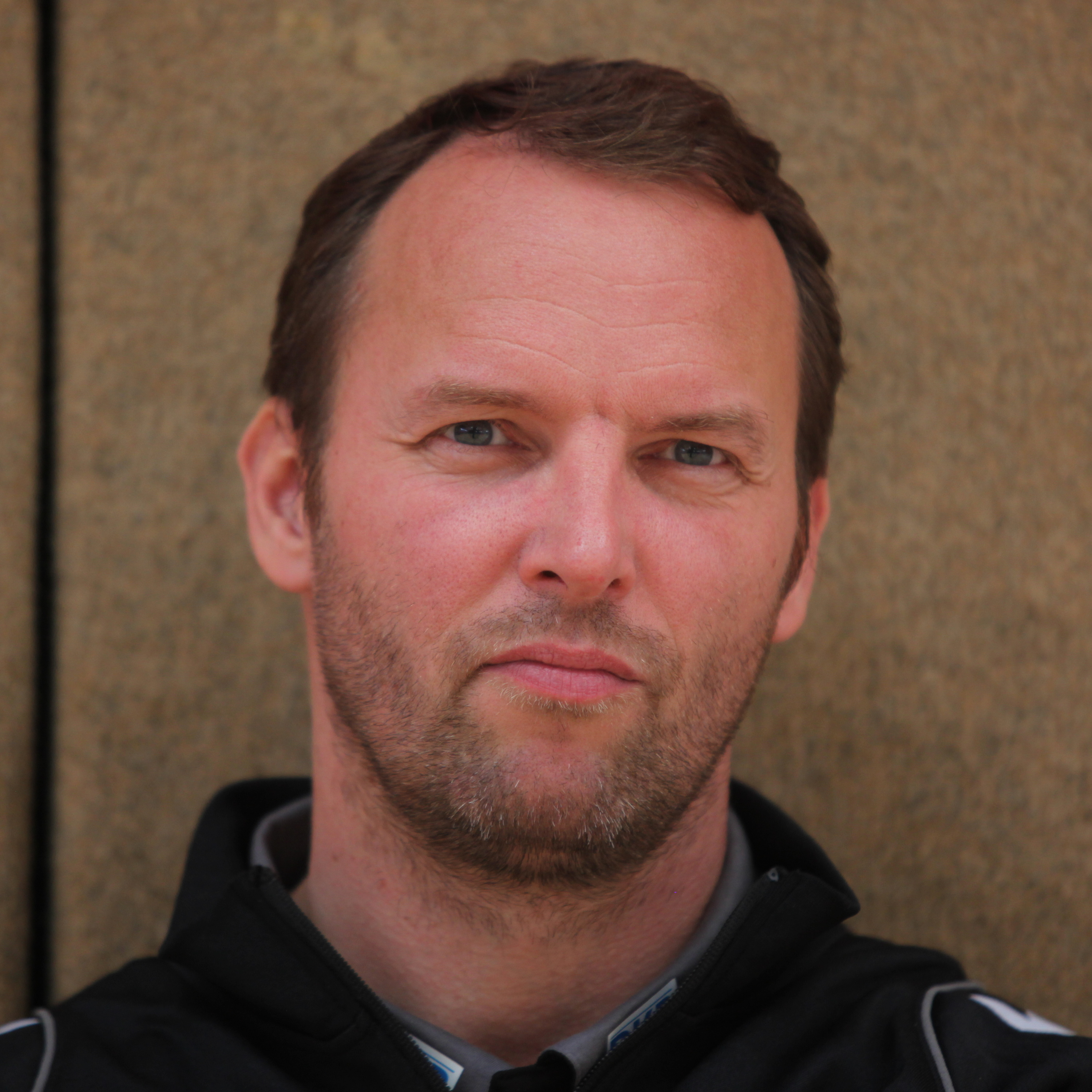
Dagur Sigurðsson (born 1973)

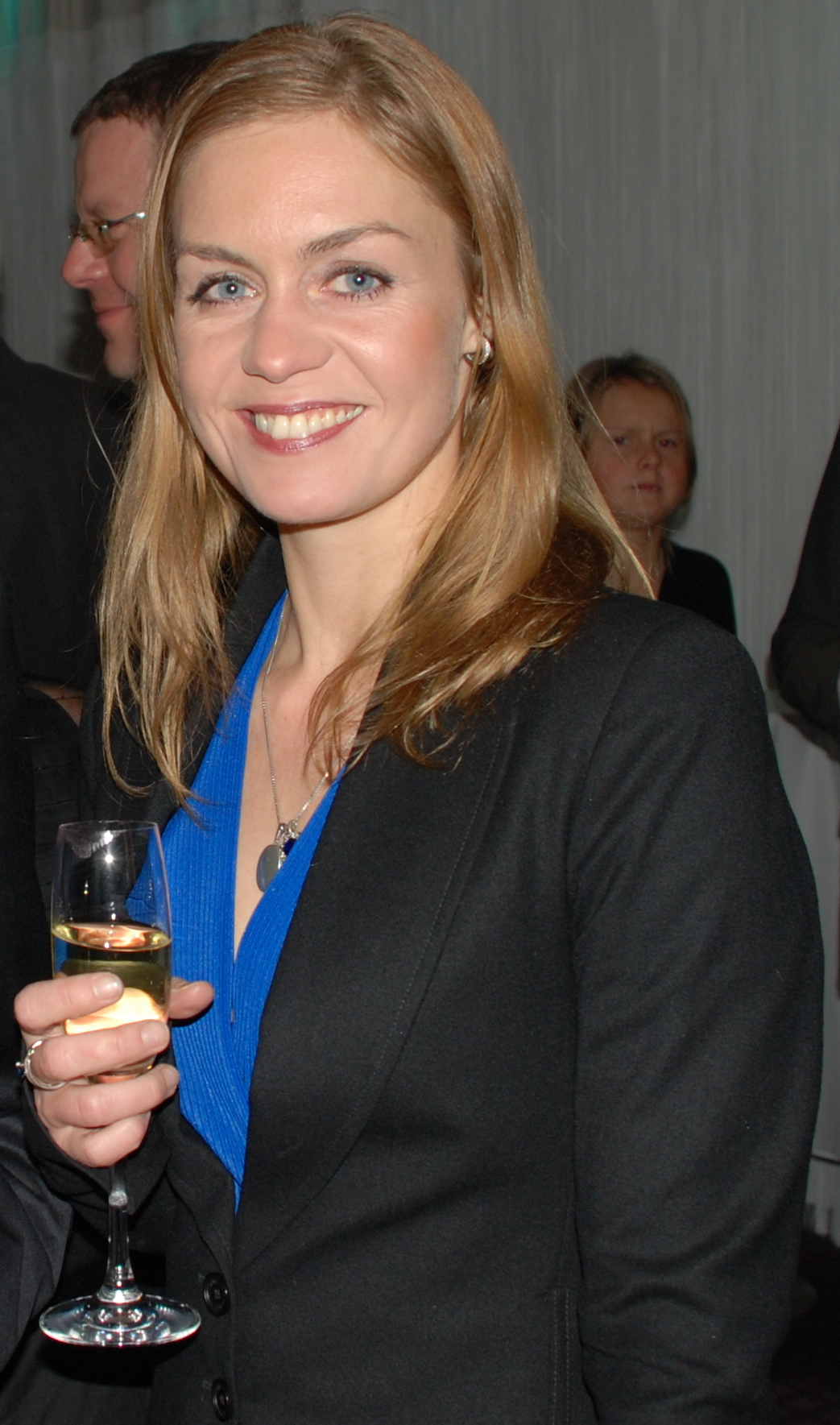
Nína Dögg Filippusdóttir (born 1974)

- Ragnar Bragason (born 1971), film director, screenwriter and producer
- Gabríela Friðriksdóttir (born 1971), artist and sculptor
- Heiða Björg Hilmisdóttir (born 1971), Icelandic politician
- Helgi Kolviðsson (born 1971), footballer
- Ragnheiður Melsteð (born 1971), executive producer and co-founder of LazyTown Entertainment
- Hera Björk (born 1972), singer
- Arnar Grétarsson (born 1972), football manager and former professional football player
- Guðjón Már Guðjónsson (born 1972), entrepreneur and the CEO of OZ
- Eygló Harðardóttir (born 1972), politician
- Gunnhildur Hauksdóttir (born 1972), visual artist
- Jón Atli Jónasson (born 1972), playwright and screenwriter
- Steinunn Kristín Þórðardóttir (born 1972), businesswoman
- Róbert Ingi Douglas (born 1973), film director, screenwriter and cinematographer
- Gísli Örn Garðarsson (born 1973), actor and director
- Judith Ingolfsson (born 1973), violinist
- Auður Jónsdóttir (born 1973), author
- Andri Snær Magnason (born 1973), writer
- Dagur Sigurðsson (born 1973), handball player
- Ólafur Stefánsson (born 1973), handball player
- Selma Björnsdóttir (born 1974), actress and singer
- Sigríður Hagalín Björnsdóttir (born 1974), author and journalist
- Garðar Thór Cortes (born 1974), tenor
- Nína Dögg Filippusdóttir (born 1974), actress and producer
- Katrin Fridriks (born 1974), abstract painter
- Kristján Helgason (born 1974), snooker player
- Hermann Hreiðarsson (born 1974), footballer
- Katrín Júlíusdóttir (born 1974), politician
- Guðmundur Þór Kárason (born 1974), puppet designer and puppeteer
- Helgi Sigurðsson (born 1974), footballer
- Mikael Torfason (born 1974), writer
- Þórólfur Beck Kristjónsson (born 1974), video game designer
- Árni Gautur Arason (born 1975), football goalkeeper
- Heimir Björgúlfsson (born 1975), artist
- Brynjar Gunnarsson (born 1975), footballer
- Sigmundur Davíð Gunnlaugsson (born 1975), politician
- Gunnleifur Gunnleifsson (born 1975), football goalkeeper
- Ófeigur Sigurðsson (born 1975), poet, novelist and translator
- Sigfús Sigurðsson (born 1975), handball player
- Héðinn Steingrímsson (born 1975), chess grandmaster
- Thóra Arnórsdóttir (born 1975), media personality

==== 1976–1980 ====
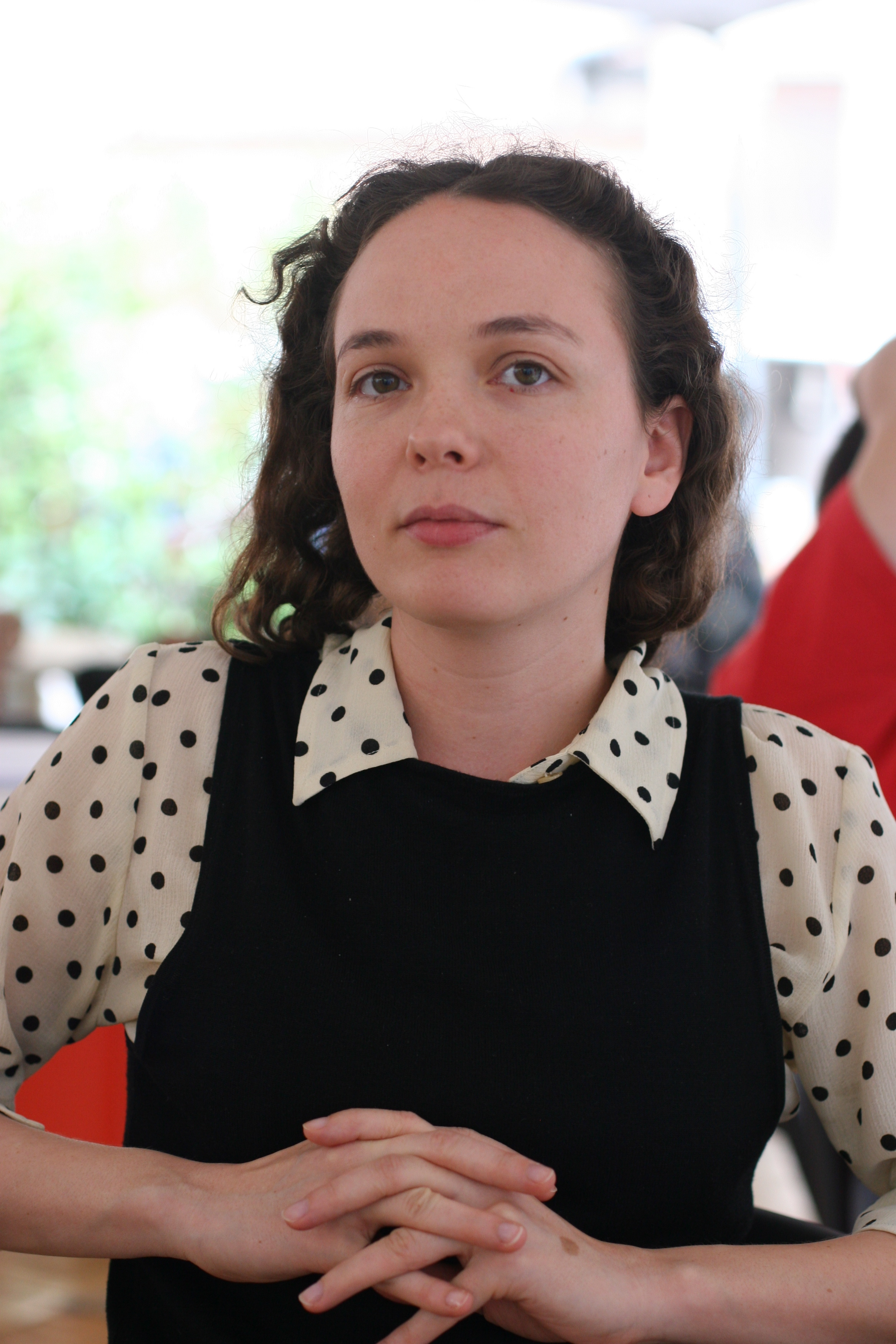
Guðrún Eva Mínervudóttir (born 1976)

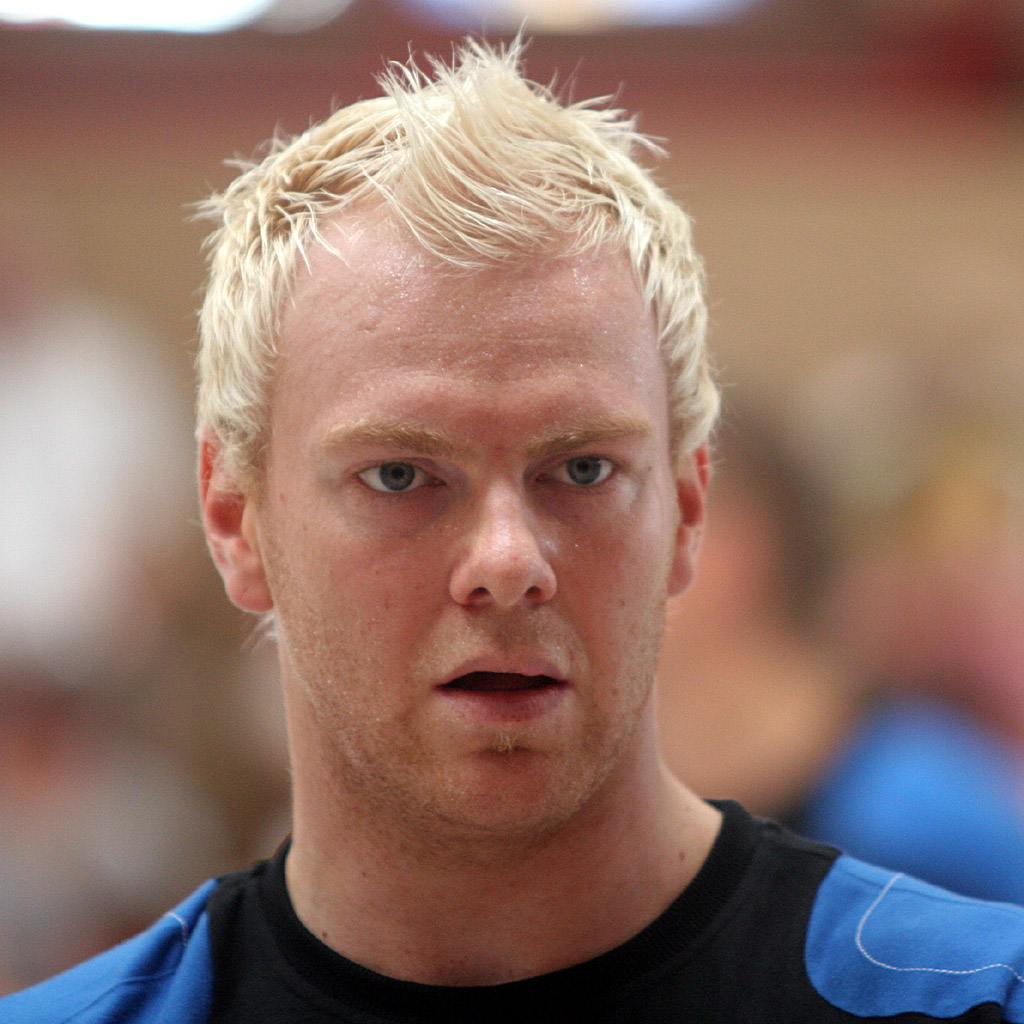
Logi Geirsson (born 1982)

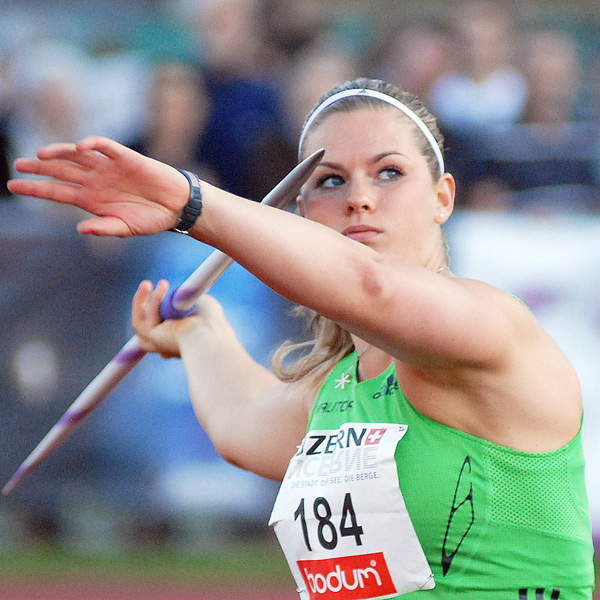
Ásdís Hjálmsdóttir (born 1985)

- Kalli Bjarni (born 1976), singer
- Bryndís Haraldsdóttir (born 1976), politician
- Katrín Jakobsdóttir (born 1976), politician
- Ragnar Kjartansson (born 1976), artist
- Guðrún Eva Mínervudóttir (born 1976), writer
- Björgvin Franz Gíslason (born 1977), actor, entertainer and children's television host
- Gylfi Gylfason (born 1977), handball player
- Haraldur Þorvarðarson (born 1977), handball player
- Ívar Ingimarsson (born 1977), footballer
- Hössi Ólafsson (born 1977), singer, rapper, producer, writer and actor
- Regína Ósk (born 1977), singer
- Snorri Snorrason (born 1977), singer
- Svala (born 1977), singer-songwriter
- Guðlaugur Arnarsson (born 1978), handball player
- Gylfi Einarsson (born 1978), football player
- Vala Flosadóttir (born 1978), athlete
- Eiður Guðjohnsen (born 1978), footballer
- Rökkvi Vésteinsson (born 1978), comedian
- Arnar Viðarsson (born 1978), footballer
- Jóhannes Ásbjörnsson (born 1979), TV and radio host
- Eva Maria Daniels (1979–2023), film producer
- Guðjón Valur Sigurðsson (born 1979), handball player
- Andri Steinn (born 1979), film editor
- Ólöf Arnalds (born 1980), singer-songwriter
- Sturla Ásgeirsson (born 1980), handball player
- Baldur Bett (born 1980), footballer
- Róbert Gunnarsson (born 1980), handball player
- Veigar Páll Gunnarsson (born 1980), football striker
- Ingimundur Ingimundarson (born 1980), handball player
- Vignir Svavarsson (born 1980), handball player

==== 1981–1985 ====
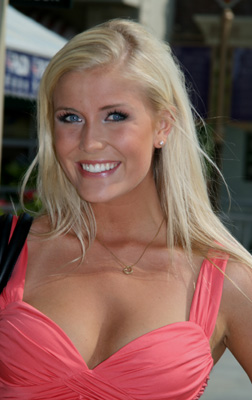
Jóhanna Vala Jónsdóttir (born 1986)

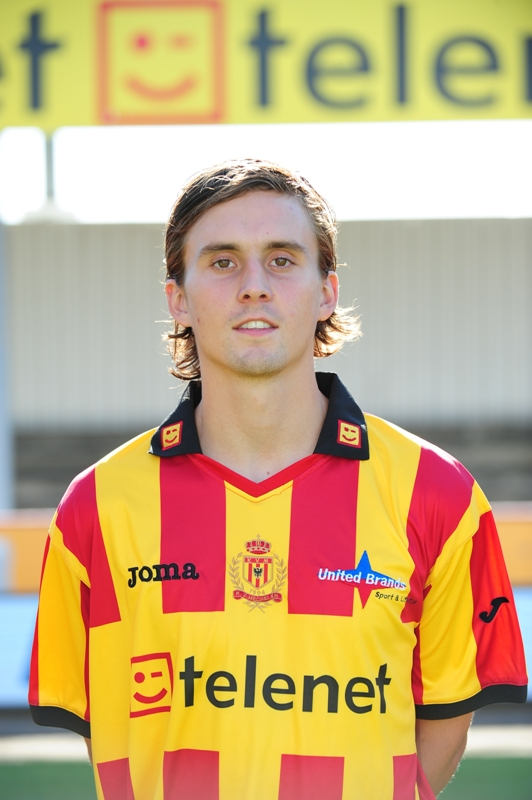
Bjarni Viðarsson (born 1988)

- Örn Arnarson (born 1981), swimmer
- Snorri Guðjónsson (born 1981), handball player
- Indriði Sigurðsson (born 1981), football defender
- Anita Briem (born 1982), actress
- Ásmundur Einar Daðason (born 1982), politician
- Hildur Vala Einarsdóttir (born 1982), singer
- Logi Geirsson (born 1982), handballer
- Hildur Guðnadóttir (born 1982), Academy Award-winning composer
- Guðmundur Steinn Gunnarsson (born 1982), composer
- Ágústa Eva Erlendsdóttir (born 1982), singer and actress
- Stefan Kristjansson (born 1982), chess grandmaster
- Jón Arnór Stefánsson (born 1982), basketball player
- Halla Vilhjálmsdóttir (born 1982), television, film actress and singer
- Hera Hjartardóttir (born 1983), singer-songwriter
- Ragna Ingólfsdóttir (born 1983), badminton player
- Hannes Sigurðsson (born 1983), football striker
- Ólafur Ingi Skúlason (born 1983), footballer
- Hannes Þór Halldórsson (born 1984), footballer
- Þórunn Helga Jónsdóttir (born 1984), footballer
- Ýmir Vigfússon (born 1984), hacker and computer security expert
- Unnur Birna Vilhjálmsdóttir (born 1984), actress, lawyer, model and beauty queen
- Ásgeir Örn Hallgrímsson (born 1984), handball player
- Hólmfríður Magnúsdóttir (born 1984), footballer
- Sölvi Ottesen (born 1984), footballer
- Birkir Már Sævarsson (born 1984), footballer
- Sunna Davíðsdóttir (born 1985), mixed martial artist
- Ásdís Hjálmsdóttir (born 1985), javelin thrower
- Þorgerður Ólafsdóttir (born 1985), visual artist

==== 1986–1990 ====
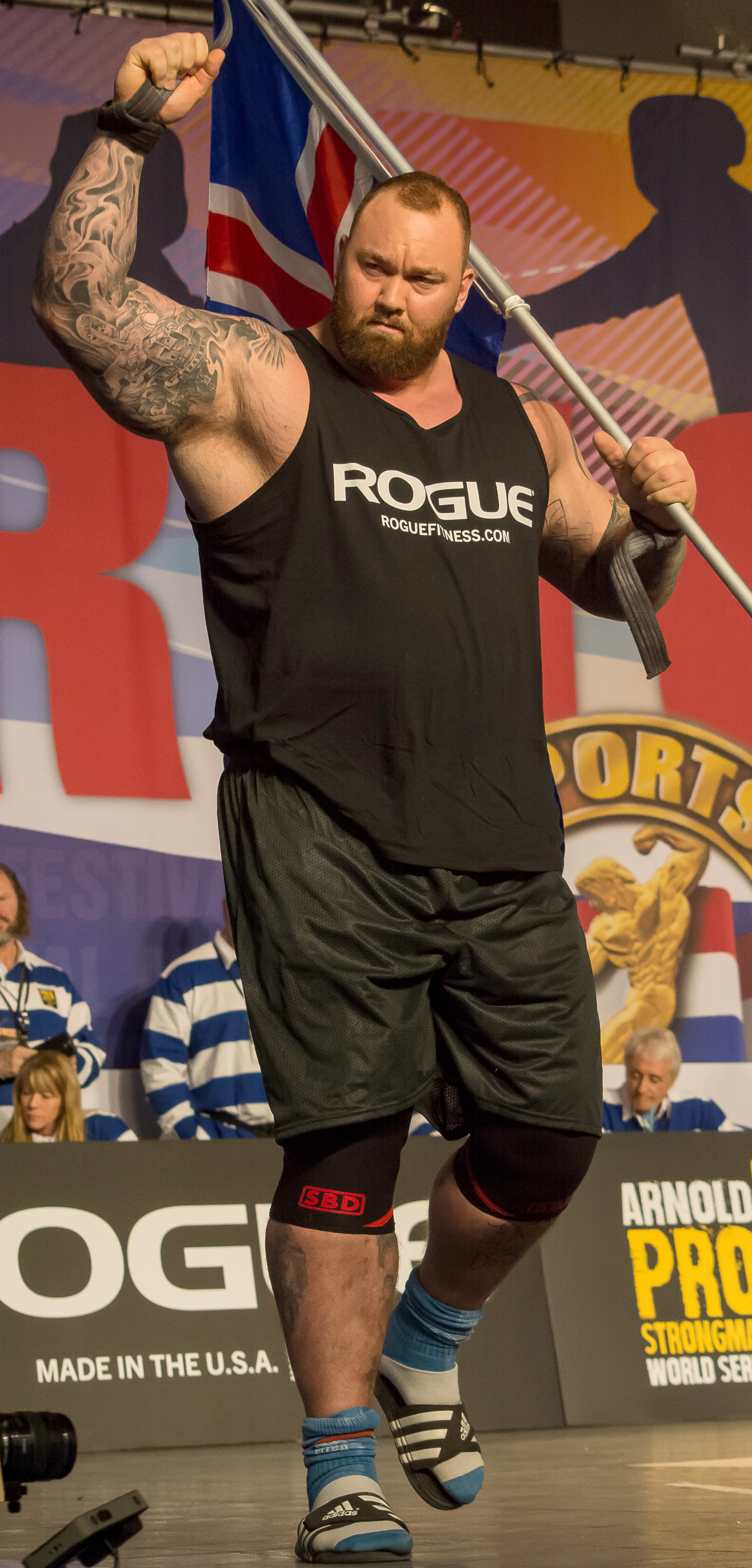
Hafþór Júlíus Björnsson (born 1988)

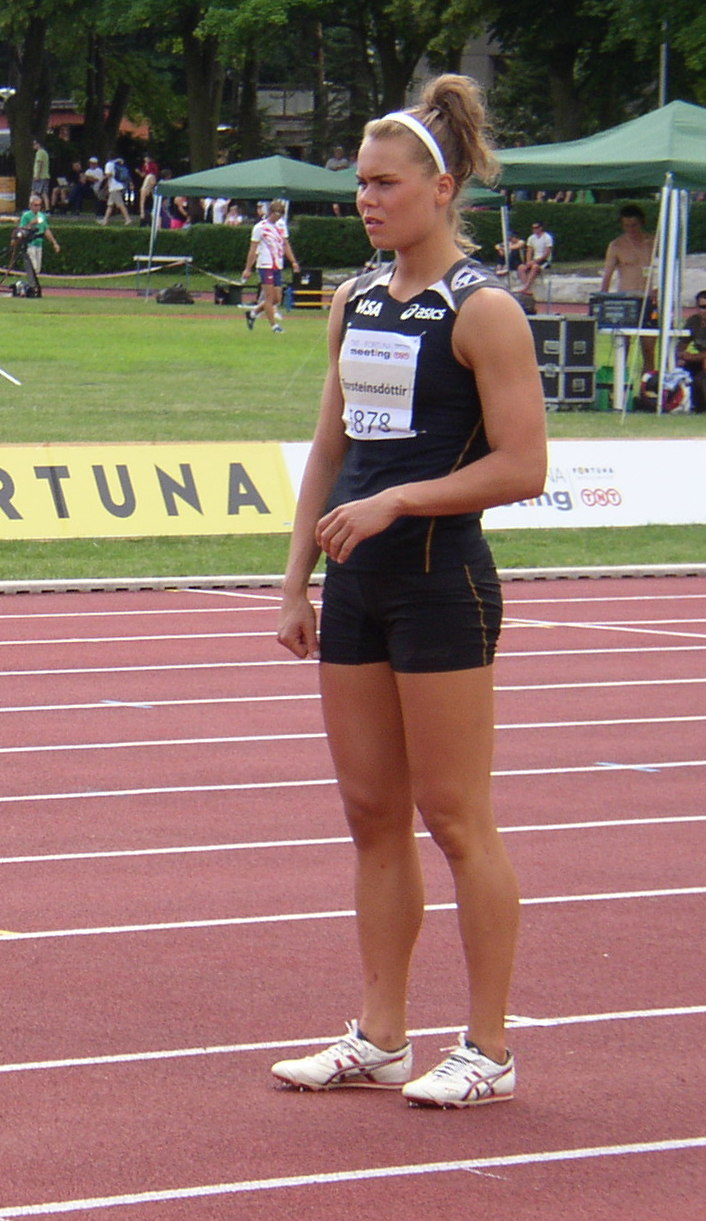
Helga Margrét Þorsteinsdóttir (born 1991)

- Helgi Þór Arason (born 1986), pop singer
- Freyja Haraldsdóttir (born 1986), politician
- Jóhanna Vala Jónsdóttir (born 1986), Miss Iceland 2007
- Ragnar Sigurðsson (born 1986), footballer
- Guðjón Baldvinsson (born 1986), footballer
- Theódór Elmar Bjarnason (born 1987), footballer
- Guðmundur Jörundsson (born 1987), fashion designer
- Ari Freyr Skúlason (born 1987), football player
- Sævar Birgisson (born 1988), cross-country skier
- Hafþór Júlíus Björnsson (born 1988), strongman, actor and former basketball player
- Salka Sól Eyfeld (born 1988), singer, actress, radio host and TV presenter
- Rúrik Gíslason (born 1988), footballer
- Bjarki Már Gunnarsson (born 1988), handball player
- Eggert Jónsson (born 1988), footballer
- Rúnar Kárason (born 1988), handball player
- Kolbeinn Kristinsson (born 1998), professional boxer
- Heida Reed (born 1988), actress and model
- Bjarni Viðarsson (born 1988), footballer
- Alfreð Finnbogason (born 1989), footballer
- Alexandra Ívarsdóttir (born 1989), beauty pageant contestant; Miss Iceland 2008
- Ögmundur Kristinsson (born 1989), football goalkeeper
- Baltasar Breki Samper (born 1989), actor
- Gylfi Sigurðsson (born 1989), footballer
- Anníe Mist Þórisdóttir (born 1989), CrossFit athlete, 2x CrossFit Games champion
- Valgerður Þóroddsdóttir (born 1989), poet and literary curator
- Bjarki Már Elísson (born 1990), handball player
- Jóhann Berg Guðmundsson (born 1990), footballer
- Kolbeinn Sigþórsson (born 1990), footballer
- Kristinn Steindórsson (born 1990), footballer

==== 1991–1999 ====
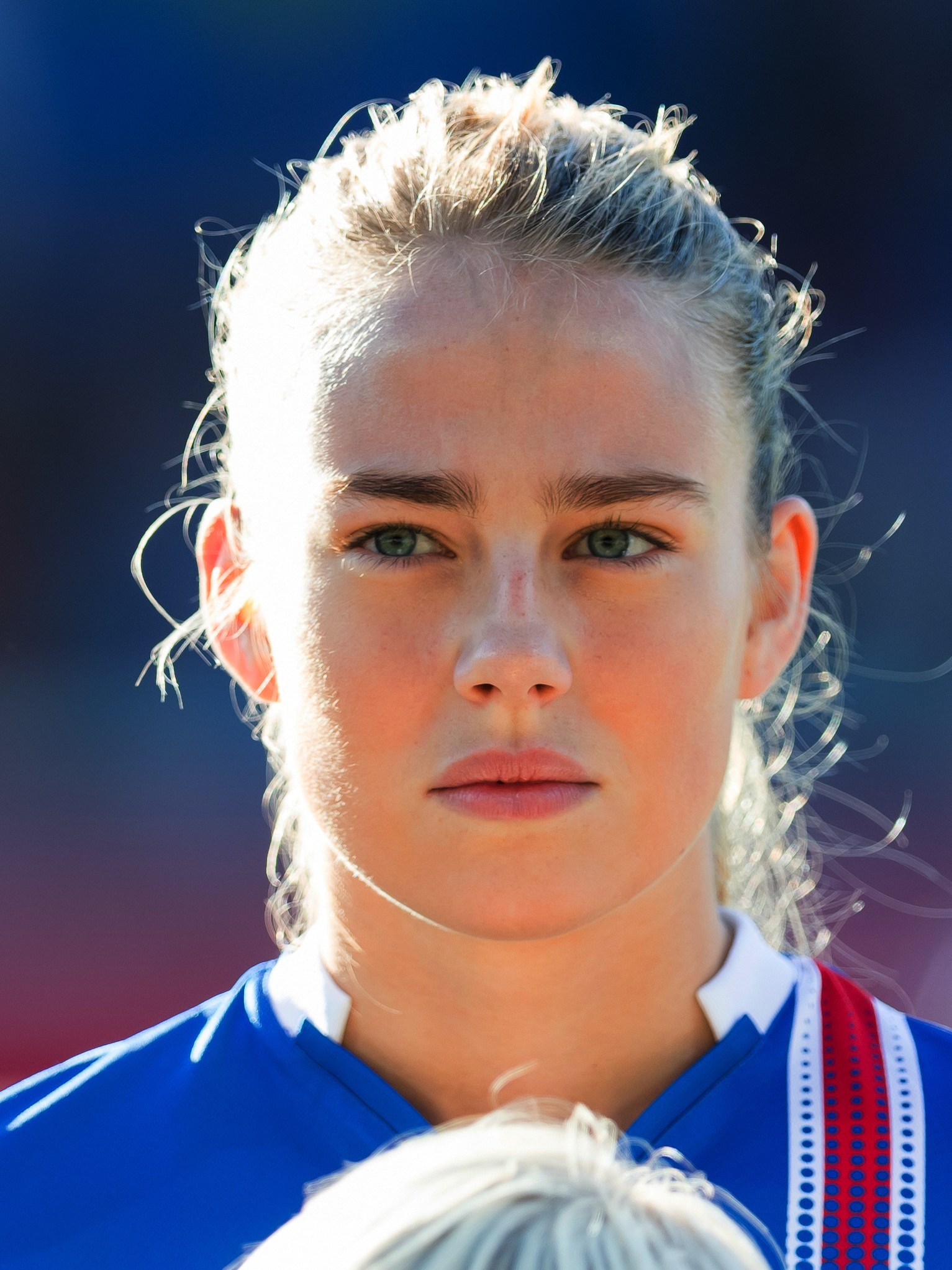
Elín Metta Jensen (born 1995)

- Helga Margrét Þorsteinsdóttir (born 1991), heptathlete
- Sigurdur Thordarson (born 1992), whistleblower
- Hjörvar Steinn Grétarsson (born 1993), chess grandmaster
- Hörður Björgvin Magnússon (born 1993), footballer
- Aron Elís Þrándarson (born 1994), footballer
- Eygló Ósk Gústafsdóttir (born 1995), swimmer
- Hjörtur Hermannsson (born 1995), footballer
- Fríða Ísberg (born 1992), novelist, short story writer and poet
- Elín Metta Jensen (born 1995), footballer
- Aníta Hinriksdóttir (born 1996), middle-distance track athlete
- Ari Ólafsson (born 1998), singer
- Laufey Lín Jónsdóttir (born 1999), singer-songwriter

== Lived in Reykjavík ==
- Einar Sveinsson (1906–1973), City Architect of Reykjavík between 1934–1973
- Nína Björk Árnadóttir (1941–2000), playwright, poet and novelist
- Árni Sigfússon (born 1956), former mayor of Reykjavík (1994)
- Svandís Svavarsdóttir (born 1964), member of the Icelandic parliament
- Disa Eythorsdottir (born 1965), Iceland-born American bridge player
- Bjarni Haukur Thorsson (born 1971), director, writer, producer and actor
- Alex Somers (born 1984), American visual artist and musician
- Gunnar Nelson (born 1988), Icelandic MMA fighter
