= Viðar =

Viðar is an Icelandic given name and surname. Notable people with the name include:

- Atli Viðar Björnsson (born 1980), Icelandic footballer
- Viðar Guðjohnsen (born 1958), Icelandic judoka
- Viðar Örn Hafsteinsson (born 1985), Icelandic basketball player and coach
- Viðar Halldórsson (born 1953), Icelandic footballer
- Viðar Ari Jónsson (born 1994), Icelandic footballer
- Viðar Örn Kjartansson (born 1990), Icelandic footballer
- Viðar Símonarson (born 1945), Icelandic handball player
- Drífa Viðar (1920–1971), Icelandic writer, artist and educator
- Jórunn Viðar (1918–2017), Icelandic composer and pianist

== See also ==
- Víðarr
