= Vigfússon =

Vigfússon is a surname of Icelandic origin, meaning son of Vigfús. In Icelandic names, the name is not strictly a surname, but a patronymic. The name refers to:

- Guðbrandur Vigfússon (1827–1889), Icelandic scholar
- Orri Vigfússon (1942–2017), Icelandic entrepreneur and environmentalist
- Ýmir Vigfússon (born 1984), Icelandic hacker and a computer security expert
