= Hákonarson =

Hákonarson is an Icelandic patronymic. In Old Norse and Icelandic names, this is not a family name but refers directly to the person's father. Notable people with the surname include:

- Einar Hákonarson (born 1945), Icelandic artist, an expressionistic and figurative painter
- Eiríkr Hákonarson (960s–1020s), earl of Lade, ruler of Norway and earl of Northumbria
- Grímur Hákonarson (born 1977), Icelandic film director
- Sveinn Hákonarson (died 1016), earl of the house of Hlaðir and co-ruler of Norway from 1000 to c. 1015
