= Snorri Magnússon =

Icelandic police officer (born 1964)

Snorri Magnússon (born 23 June 1964) has been the head of the Icelandic Association of Police Officers (Landssamband lögreglumanna) since May 2008.

Snorri was born in Reykjavík, Iceland. His parents are Karolína Snorradóttir (1944) and Magnús Hákonarson (1940 - 2015). His father's brother is the artist Einar Hákonarson. Snorri graduated from the Fjölbrautaskóli in Breiðholt and joined the police force in Reykjavík in November 1984 after a general strike by the Confederation of State and Municipal Employees of Iceland.

He graduated from the national police academy in 1987 and completed Special Forces training in May 1987, after which, while continuing to work with the conventional police in Reykjavík, he was also a member of the Special Police Task Force until November 1992. From then until 1998 he was with the Drug Division of the Reykjavík police, since when he has been assigned to General Investigations. From 1999 to 2000, he served with the United Nations Peacekeeping Force in Bosnia and Herzegovina. From 2000 to 2001 he was a general investigator with the Reykjavík police. From April 2001 to June 2005 he was part of the United Nations security force in Kosovo and serving as the Chief Security Officer for the UN in Liberia during the mission start-up phase.

Snorri Magnússon was elected as the chairman of the Icelandic Association of Police Officers in May 2008. He has been re-elected four times, in 2010, 2012, 2014 and 2016. Since October 2012 he has been on the board and executive board and served as treasurer of the Confederation of State and Municipal Employees of Iceland (BSRB).
