= Ragnheiður Bragadóttir =

Icelandic academic

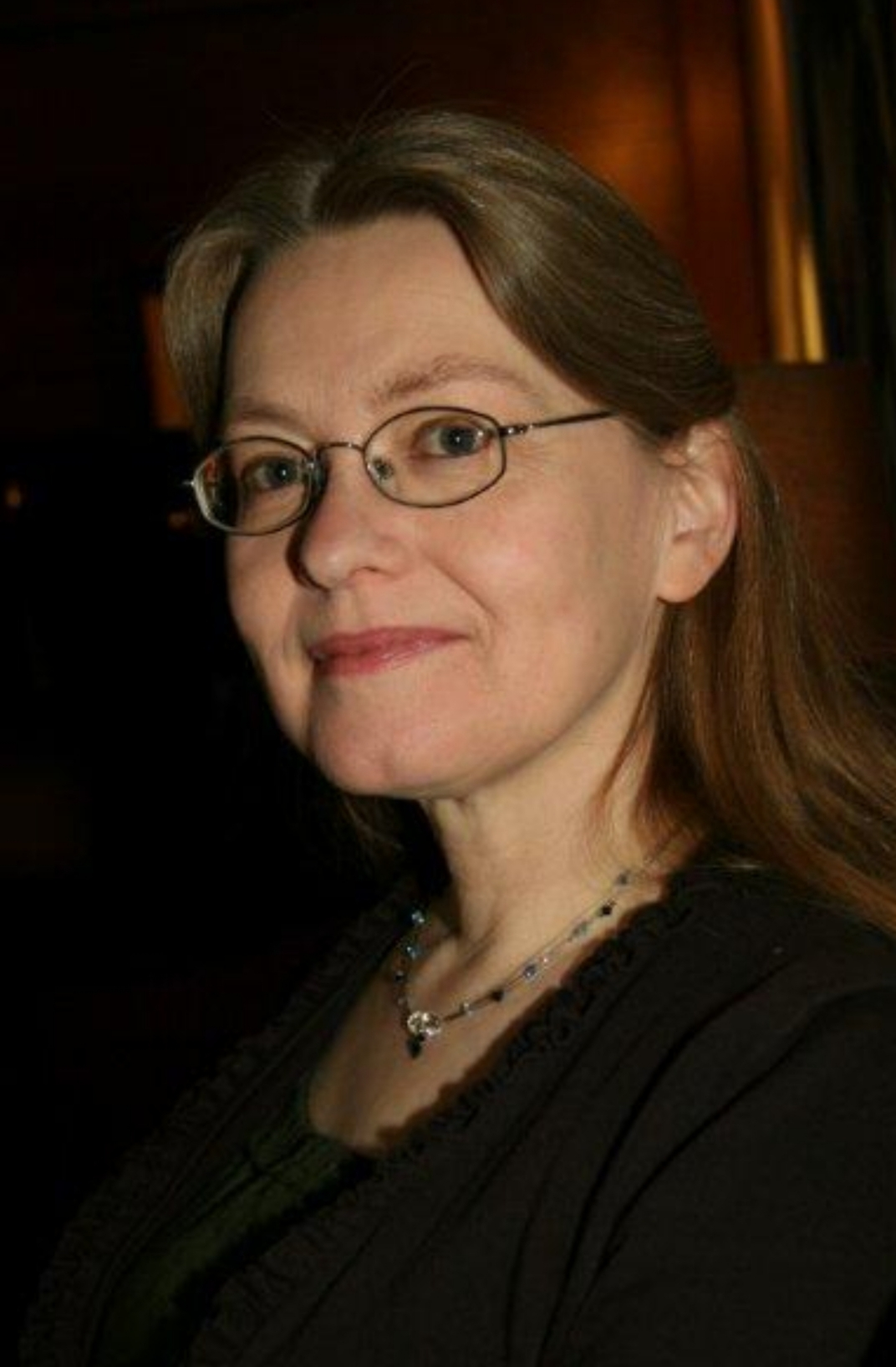
- Born: 10 May 1956 (age 70); Reykjavík
- Occupation: emerita professor of law at the University of Iceland

Ragnheiður Bragadóttir (born 1956) is emerita professor of law at the Faculty of Law of the University of Iceland.

== Professional experience ==
Ragnheiður was born in Reykjavik 10 May 1956. She completed her matriculation examination from the Ancient Languages Department of Menntaskólinn í Reykjavík (Junior College in Reykjavik) in the spring of 1976 and a master's degree in law (cand. juris) from the Faculty of Law of the University of Iceland in the spring of 1982. In addition, she attended graduate courses on criminal law, criminology, and criminal policy at the Institute of Criminology (Kriminalistisk Institut) at the Faculty of Law of the University of Copenhagen from 1982 to 1983 with a scholarship from the Danish Ministry of Education. She studied criminology at the master's level at the Faculty of Law of the University of Iceland in the autumn semester of 1983.

Ragnheiður was an assistant judge at the Reykjavík Criminal Court in 1984 and a legal expert at the Ministry of Justice and Ecclesiastical Affairs from 1984 to 1985. She taught criminal law at The Prison Warden School from 1985 to 1991 and at The State Police Academy from 1989 to 1994. In 1984, Ragnheiður began teaching criminal law part-time at the Faculty of Law of the University of Iceland, became an adjunct in 1985, an assistant professor in 1989, an associate professor in 1995, and on 1 January 2000 she was the first woman in Iceland to become a professor of law.

In 2024, Ragnheiður was awarded the Nordic Law Prize for exceptional research in criminal law and criminology, especially on sexual offences and other offences against women and children. According to the prize regulations, the prize is only awarded to Nordic lawyers for outstanding work and/or academic research in the field of law. Only one other Icelander has been awarded this prize; Ármann Snævarr, professor of law at the University of Iceland in 1993.

== Other work and projects ==
Ragnheiður has served in various positions of confidentiality under the auspices of the University of Iceland, as well as outside it, and sat on various boards of directors. She has chaired the Pardons Committee of the Ministry of Justice since 1993. She was on the Board of Directors of the Law Institute of the University of Iceland from 2005 to 2016, including being Chairwoman of the Board of Directors from 2013 to 2016. From 2005-2010 she was a member of the research education committee of the Faculty of Law of the University of Iceland. She was on the Curriculum Committee of the Faculty of Law from 2003 to 2007 and Chaired the Master's Curriculum Committee of the Faculty of Law in Environmental Studies from 2001 to 2005. She was on the Teaching Committee of the University of Iceland's University Council from 2003 to 2008, on the board of directors and the Allocation Committee of the University of Iceland's Assistantship Fund from 2004 to 2009, and on the first Board of Directors of the Research Centre of Women's Studies at the University of Iceland from 1990 to 1992. Additionally, she has participated in various workgroups under the auspices of the University on diverse matters. She has chaired the Icelandic Society of Criminology since 2009 and was on the examination committee of stockbrokers from 1993 to 1996. While studying at university, she was on the board of editors of Úlfljótur, the law students’ journal, from 1978 to 1979.

Ragnheiður has actively participated in Nordic cooperation in her field and was Iceland's representative on the Scandinavian Research Council for Criminology (Nordisk Samarbejdsråd for Kriminologi, NSfK) from 1998 to 2012, vice-chairman from 2007 to 2009, and chairman from 2010 to 2012 and managed the office at the University of Iceland. During Ragnheiður's chairmanship, NSfK had its 50th anniversary, which was celebrated in Iceland. On the occasion, the Council published an anthology, Nordic Criminology in Fifty Years, which Ragnheiður edited.

== Research and main written work ==
Ragnheiður has a long professional career of teaching and writing. She has published books, many chapters in books, and articles in academic journals, both in Iceland and abroad, in addition to reports and drafts of parliamentary bills. Her most important research areas are: criminal law (general and special part), sexual offences, and other offences against women and children, environmental criminal law, criminal sanctions, and criminal policy. Over the last 20 years, she has done extensive research on legislation and judgements involving sexual offences. She has written four fundamental works on this subjects: Rape and other offences against people's sexual freedom (2018), Rape – University of Iceland's Law Institute Series no. 14 (2015), Sexual offences – A Book on Court Judgements (2009), and Rape – University of Iceland's Law Institute Series no. 3 (2006), in addition to numerous articles and chapters in books in Iceland and abroad. She drafted a parliamentary bill that became the current provisions on sexual offences in the General Penal Code (2007). Ragnheiður's noteworthy books on other topics include: Textbook on criminal law for The Icelandic Police Academy (1995) and Icelandic Environmental Criminal Law (1988).

Ragnheiður participates actively in Nordic and international research collaboration. She has, for example, done research at the University of Copenhagen's Faculty of Law, at the Max-Planck-Institut für ausländisches und internationales Strafrecht in Freiburg im Breisgau in Germany, at the Faculty of Law at Cambridge University in England, and at the Boalt Hall School of Law (now Memorial Hall of Law), University of California, Berkeley, USA.

Ragnheiður has initiated and managed Nordic research projects, such as the two following projects under the auspices of NSfK: Miljøstrafferet og retspolitik i de nordiske lande (2010–2012), dealing with legislation providing sanctions for environmental protection, and Straf for seksualforbrydelser i Norden (2012), dealing with legal provisions on rape in the Nordic countries, and how punishment is determined for rape offences. Additionally, Ragnheiður participated in researching legislation on prostitution in the Nordic countries (Prostitutionslovgivning i de nordiske lande), the findings of which were published in Nordisk Tidsskrift for Kriminalvidenskab (2005). Another study was on sanctions outside institutions in the Nordic countries (Samfundssanktioner i Norde), see Nordisk Tidsskrift for Kriminalvidenskab (2001). Ragnheiður has also participated in international research projects, such as: International research on environmental criminal law, conducted under the auspices of the Max-Planck-Institut für ausländisches und internationales Strafrecht, Freiburg im Breisgau, the findings of which were published in the book Umweltstrafrecht in den nordischen Landern. Arbeiten zum Umweltrecht 10 (1994); and a European research project on politicians´criminal liability, see her article in the book Criminal Liability of Political Decision-Makers – A Comparative Perspective (2017). See also a joint Nordic project dealing with judicial rules on criminal jurisdiction in the Nordic countries. Its findings appear in two books: Criminal Jurisdiction – A Nordic Perspective (2014) and Strafrechtliche Jurisdiktion – Eine nordische Perspektive (2017).

Since 1999, Ragnheiður has been on the editorial board of Nordisk Tidsskrift for Kriminalvidenskab (NTfK), Journal of Scandinavian Studies in Criminology and Crime Prevention 1999-2003 and the Nordic Journal of Criminology since 2018. Ragnheiður has given lectures on her research at many international, Nordic, and domestic conferences and symposiums.

== Personal life ==
Ragnheiður grew up in Reykjavik, Iceland. Her parents were Ragnheiður Gunnarsdóttir (1933-2020), bank secretary and housewife, and Bragi Hannesson (1932-2026), attorney, bank manager of The Industrial Bank of Iceland plc. and director of Industrial Loan Fund. Her sisters are Ásdís, teacher (b. 1958) and Bryndís, piano teacher (b. 1968). Ragnheiður is married to Bjarni Kristjánsson, business administration graduate and managing director (b. 1956). They have two daughters, two granddaughters and a grandson.
