= Þorgerður Ólafsdóttir =

Icelandic visual artist (born 1985)

Þorgerður Ólafsdóttir (Icelandic pronunciation: [ˈθɔrcɛrðʏr ˈouːlafsˌtouʰtɪr̥]; born 1985) is an Icelandic visual artist.

== Life ==
Born in Reykjavík, Ólafsdóttir received a Bachelor of Fine Arts from IUA in 2009. She graduated with Master of Fine Arts from the Glasgow School of Art in Scotland in 2013. She resided in Reykjavik, Iceland.

From 2014 to 2018, she was the Director of the Living Art Museum (NÝLÓ). In 2014 she established the biannual art project Staðir/Places in the Westfjords of Iceland, together with artist Eva Isleifsdóttir.
