= Guðrún Eva Mínervudóttir =

Icelandic writer (born 1976)

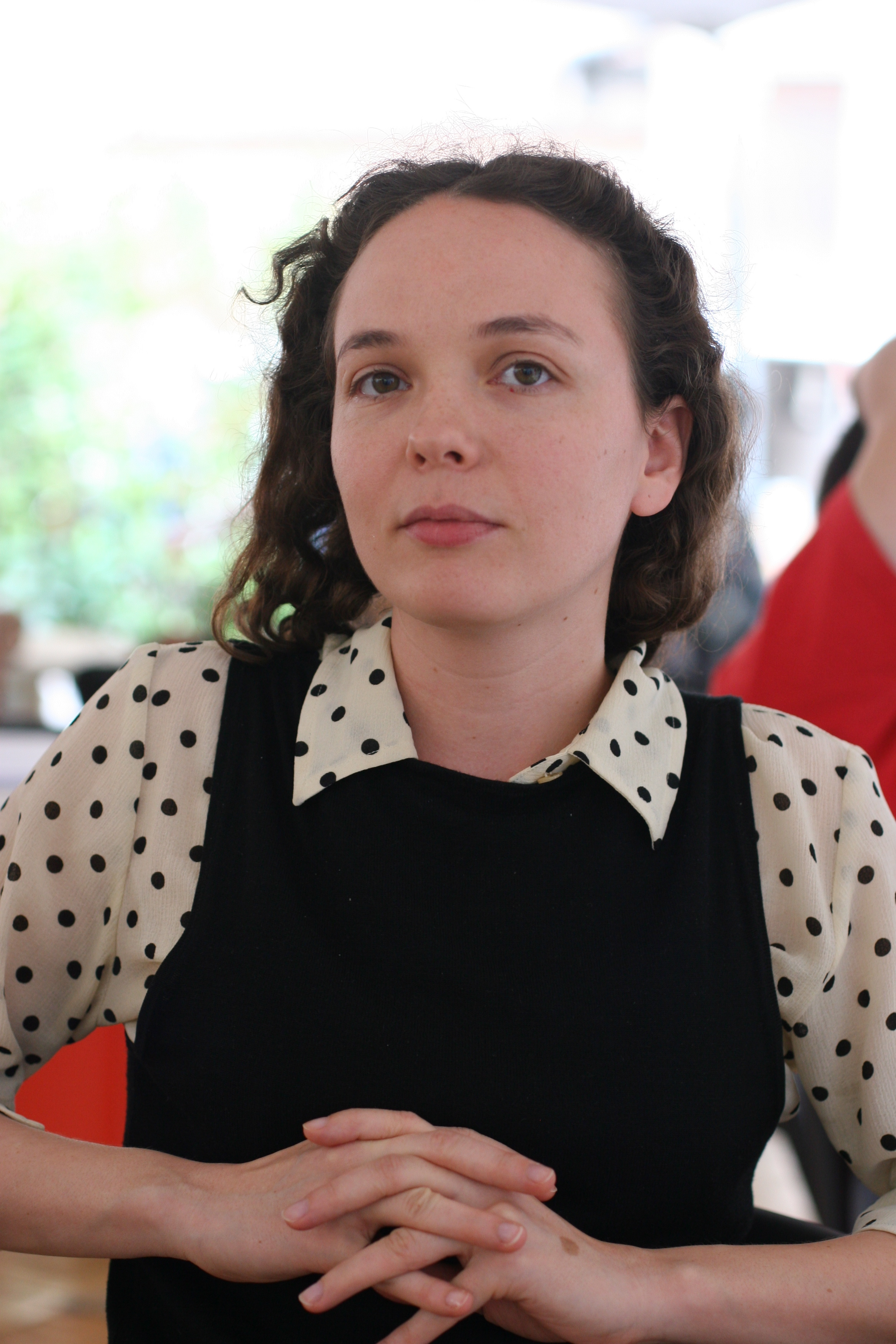
Guðrún Eva Mínervudóttir.

Guðrún Eva Mínervudóttir (born 17 March 1976) is an Icelandic writer. She studied philosophy at the University of Iceland.

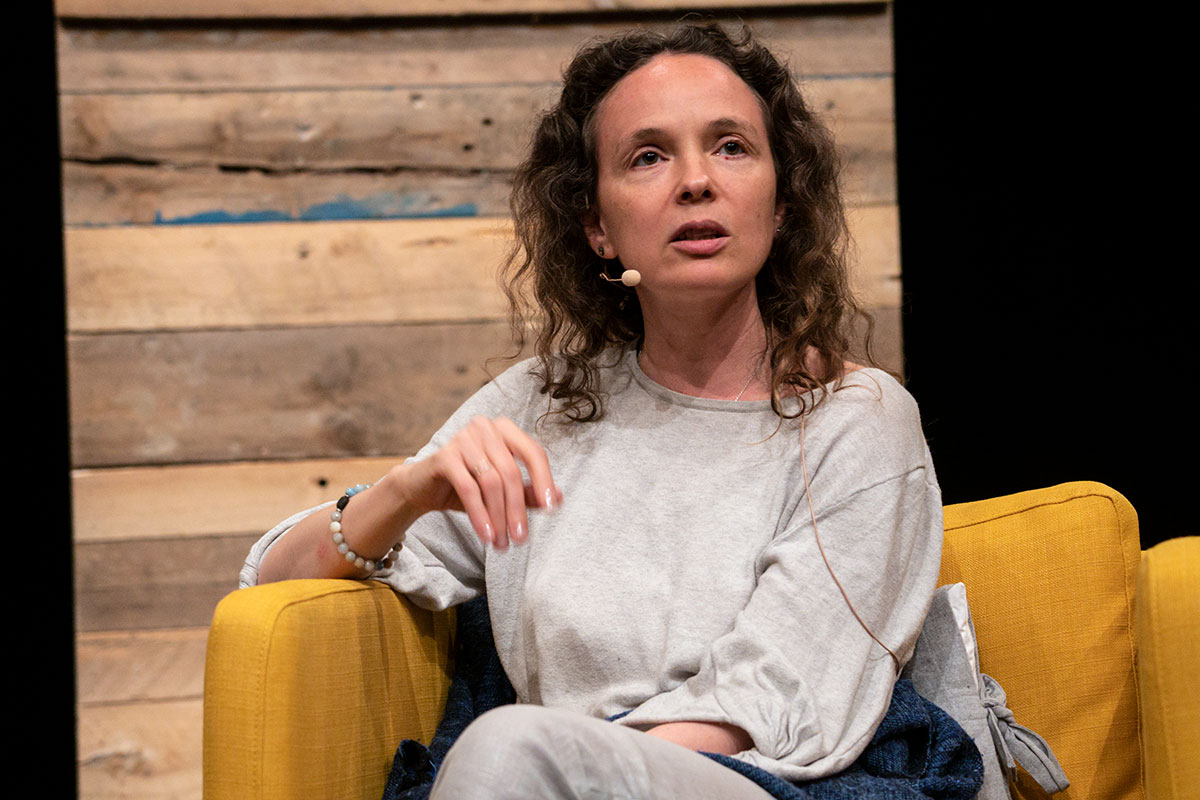
Literaturexchange Festival (Aarhus, Denmark 2022) Photo Hreinn Guðlaugsson

Her first novel and collection came out in 1998 to acclaim. She has written five novels since then. In 2000, her novel Fyrirlestur um hamingjuna ("Lecture on Happiness") was nominated for the Icelandic Literary Prize. In 2006 she was awarded the DV Culture Prize for the novel Yosoy. In 2012, she was awarded the Icelandic Literary Prize for Allt með kossi vekur ("Everything Is Woken with a Kiss").

== Bibliography ==
- Skaparinn (2008) (translated as The Creator, 2012)
