= Rökkvi Vésteinsson =

Icelandic comedian (born 1978)

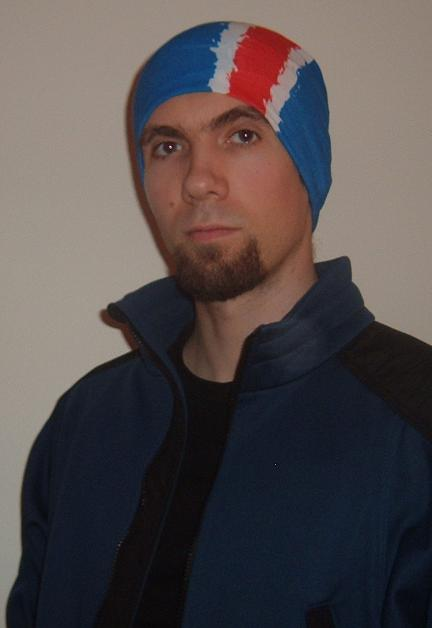
Photo of Rökkvi Vésteinsson

Rökkvi Vésteinsson (born 22 March 1978) is an Icelandic comedian. He was born in the capital city of Iceland, Reykjavík. He has performed standup comedy in Iceland and Montreal and Ottawa, Canada, as well as in Ireland, Belgium and the Netherlands. He studied improv with Terence Bowman in Montreal, who is a founding member of an improv troupe called On the Spot (Improv).

== Tours ==
- September 2006 – October 2006: "Documentary Tour" in Canada, England, and Ireland
- 28 February 2008 – 9 March 2008: "Damaged Goods Tour" ("Skemmd Vara") in the Netherlands and Belgium
