= Ýmir Vigfússon =

Icelandic computer programmer

Ymir Vigfusson
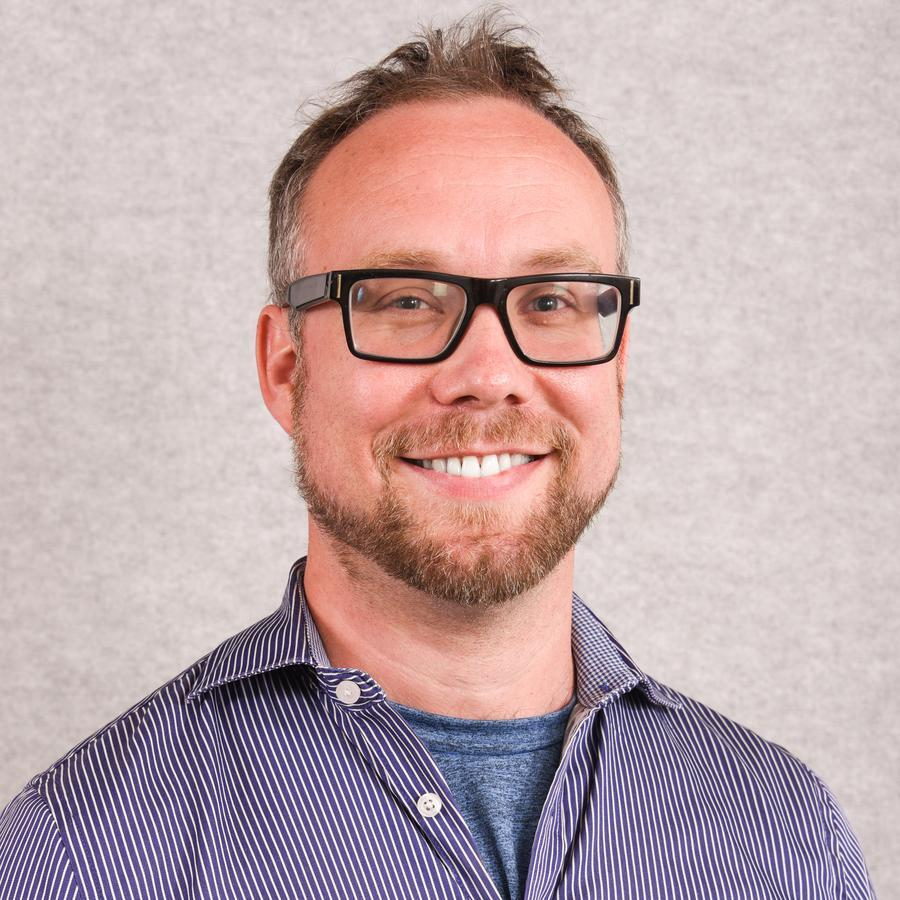
- Born: Ýmir Vigfússon; January 1984 (age 42); Reykjavík, Iceland
- Education: University of Iceland (B.S.); Cornell University (Ph.D.)
- Occupations: CTO at Keystrike, Associate Professor at Emory University.
- Known for: Cybersecurity education
- Awards: NSF CAREER
- Scientific career
- Fields: Computer science; Data science
- Workplaces: Emory University (2014–); Reykjavik University (2011–2014)
- Thesis: Affinity in Distributed Systems (2010)
- Doctoral advisor: Ken Birman
- Website: www.ymsir.com

Ymir Vigfusson is an Icelandic hacker, computer science professor, and entrepreneur. He is the co-founder and CTO of Keystrike, a cybersecurity company, and former Associate Professor at Emory University, where he co-directed the Emory SimBioSys (Simulation, Systems, and Biology) lab with Avani Wildani.

== Cybersecurity career ==
In 2011, as Assistant Professor at Reykjavik University, Vigfusson created an annual hacking competition to raise national awareness of cybersecurity. Unlike the customary jeopardy format, the competition departed from norms by having contestants hack and maintain access to one another's workstations live on stage in front of an audience and cameras, while receiving points for maintaining backdoor access to other computers. Featuring a scoreboard, educational commentary by Vigfusson, and live music, the events were extensively covered by media in Iceland. The international press also showed interest, including a reporter at Vocativ who asked Vigfusson to hack them live on air. Using the contests as a model, Vigfusson incorporated competitive hacking into annual undergraduate courses on cybersecurity at both Reykjavik University and Emory University.

In 2014, Vigfusson gave a talk at TEDxReykjavik titled simply "Why I teach people how to hack". The talk, arguing that learning cybersecurity through hacking was essential to understanding cyberdefense and also more fun, became a viral phenomenon that received over 1.8 million views. Vigfusson was invited back in 2019, where, while wearing a balaclava, he delivered the talk "You should learn how to hack" that received over 350,000 views. In the lectures and a later cybersecurity podcast, Vigfusson revealed that he "grew up as a hacker", having gotten his first job as a teenager at an ISP after notifying them that he had hacked their servers, and that he was among the first developers of format string exploits. He also claimed to have "stopped hacking after developing a moral compass" and that he has since been "seeking amends for [his] past".

In 2013, Vigfusson co-founded Syndis, a penetration testing company and consultancy based in Reykjavík, and stayed on its Board of Directors until the company was acquired by Origo hf. in 2021. Syndis became the de-facto cybersecurity company in Iceland and received multiple IT accolades during the period. In 2018, he co-founded Adversary, an online platform for cybersecurity education, where developers are placed in the shoes of hackers. Adversary was acquired by Secure Code Warrior in 2020.

In 2023, Vigfusson co-founded Keystrike, a company producing synonymous cybersecurity products that allow for secure remote access even when the user has been compromised, but without needing additional user input. The idea behind Keystrike received Emory University's "Innovation of the Year" award. Vigfusson and the founding team were invited to the prestigious Berkeley SkyDeck accelerator program in 2023 and secured angel and pre-seed investment the same year.

== Research career ==
Vigfusson's academic research spans the areas of distributed computer systems and data science, and includes paper awards from a range of scientific communities. His work on distributed systems is focused on caching algorithms and distributed tracing systems. In 2016, Vigfusson received the prestigious CAREER Award from the National Science Foundation for his project on "rethinking the cache abstraction". He is the co-inventor of SIEVE, a cache eviction algorithm published in 2024 that is "very effective, and an extremely simple change on top of a basic FIFO queue."

Vigfusson's research in data science is primarily centered on computational epidemiology. Prior to COVID-19, he led a project, published in PNAS, around using anonymous cellphone data to quantify epidemics, "[demonstrating] deviations in the movements of influenza-infected members of the population that will likely impact disease transmission." He has also helped develop mathematical techniques for the CDC to quantify and disambiguate mixtures of malarial strains or antibiotic-resistant bacteria.

== See also ==
- Emory University
- Computer Security
- Hacker (computer security)
