= Drífa Viðar =

Icelandic writer, artist and educator (1920–1971)

Drífa Viðar (5 March 1920 – 19 May 1971) was an Icelandic writer, artist and educator.

The daughter of Einar Viðar and Katrín Norðmann, she was born in Reykjavík. She received her qualifications as a teacher and went on to study art in Reykjavík, New York City and Paris. In New York, she studied with Morris Kantor at the Art Students League. She is said to have been the first Icelandic woman to engage in abstract painting. Drífa contributed literary criticism to the feminist publication Melkorka during the 1960s. She published her first novel Fjalldalslilja in 1967. A collection of short stories, Dagar við vatnið, was published posthumously in 1971.

She married Skúil Thoroddsen, a doctor; the couple had four children. She was the younger sister of the composer Jórunn Viðar. In collaboration with her sister, she worked on a libretto for the opera Snær konungur (King Snow) in 1943–1945. This would have been the first Icelandic opera, but the work remained unfinished.

In 2025, a volume about Drífa's art and life was published by Ástríki Press in Iceland.

== See also ==
- List of Icelandic writers
- Icelandic literature
