= Jórunn Viðar =

Icelandic composer and pianist (1918–2017)

Jórunn Viðar (7 December 1918 – 27 February 2017) was an Icelandic pianist and composer. She was the first classically trained female composer in Iceland and her music is frequently inspired by Icelandic folk songs and folklore.

== Biography ==
Jórunn Viðar was born and grew up in Reykjavík, Iceland. In 1937 she graduated from Reykjavík Grammar School, and the same year travelled to Germany to study piano for two years at the Music Academy in Berlin. She returned to Iceland and married Lárus Fjeldsted (1918–1985), and began to study composition with Victor Urbancic, an Austrian musician who was living in exile in Reykjavík. In 1943, Jórunn's husband was diagnosed with acute lymphoma and was treated with radiation at a hospital in Baltimore. Once he had recovered, Jórunn joined him in New York City where they lived until December 1945. There, she studied composition with Vittorio Giannini at the Juilliard School of Music and took private piano lessons with the Polish pianist and pedagogue Helena Morsztyn. In 1943–1945 Jórunn worked on an opera in collaboration with her younger sister, the writer and artist Drífa Viðar. Titled Snær konungur (King Snow), it drew on old Icelandic mythology and would have been the first Icelandic opera. However, Jórunn put the work aside upon her return to Iceland in December 1945 and it remains incomplete.

After moving back to Iceland, Jórunn Viðar worked as a pianist and accompanist. She gave several solo recitals and performed with the Iceland Symphony Orchestra, for example in concertos by Mozart, Beethoven, and Schumann, as well as her own composition, the piano concerto Slátta (1977). Among her other large works are two ballet scores, Eldur (Fire, 1950) and Ólafur liljurós (Olaf the Lily-Rose, 1952), the latter based on an old folk tale. She also composed the substantial film score for Síðasti bærinn í dalnum (The Last Farm in the Valley, 1950), the first Icelandic film with music.

Jórunn Viðar was a prolific composer of songs. Her earliest surviving song, Mamma ætlar að sofna (Mother Wants to Sleep) was written in 1940. Among her best-know songs are Vökuró, a lullaby to a poem by the Icelandic writer Jakobína Sigurðardóttir, which reached a global audience when Björk included it on her 2004 album Medúlla. Locally, her best-know song is Það á að gefa börnum brauð (Children Should Be Given Bread, ca. 1950), a Christmas song to a folk text. The folk-like characteristics of Jórunn's setting have resulted in it frequently being mistaken for a folk-song arrangement, yet the music is entirely her own creation. Another Christmas piece from her later years is Jól (Yule, 1989) for children's choir, flute, and organ, which was commissioned by RÚV, the Icelandic public radio broadcaster.

In 1989 Jórunn was awarded the Order of the Falcon, Knight's Cross class (Riddarakross), for accomplishments in music. She was Honorary Artist of the City of Reykjavík in 1999. She was awarded the Lifetime Achievement Award at the Icelandic Music Awards in 2004, and the DV Culture Award in 2009.

A documentary on her life and career, Jórunn Viðar: Orðið tónlist by the Icelandic filmmaker Ari Alexander Ergis Magnússon, premiered in 2009. It was nominated for the 2010 Edda Awards for Best Music. Her biography (Jórunn Viðar: Ævisaga), by the Icelandic musicologist Árni Heimir Ingólfsson, was published in 2026.

Her works are published by Iceland Music.

== Selected works ==
Orchestral:

- Eldur (Fire), ballet score (orchestra, 1950)
- Ólafur liljurós (Olaf the Lily-Rose), ballet score (orchestra, 1952)
- Slátta, piano concerto (1977)

Choral:

- Mansöngur fyrir Ólafs rímu Grænlendings (The Rhymes of Olaf the Greenlander), SATB choir and piano or string orchestra (ca. 1953; text: Einar Benediktsson)
- Jól for children's choir, flute, and organ (1989, text: Stefán frá Hvítadal)

Instrumental/chamber:

- Variations on an Icelandic Folk Song, cello and piano, 1961.
- Meditations on Five Icelandic Folk Tunes (Hugleiðingar um fimm gamlar stemmur), piano, ca. 1965.

Songs:

- Gestaboð um nótt (Text: Einar Bragi Sigurðsson)
- Glugginn (Text: Halldór Kiljan Laxness)
- Hvítur hestur í tunglskini (Text: Aðalsteinn Kristmundsson)
- Im Kahn (Text: Cäsar Flaischlen)
- Júnímorgunn (Text: Tómas Guðmundsson)
- Kall sat undir kletti (Text: Halldóra B. Björnsson)
- Mamma ætlar að sofna (Text: Davið Stefansson)
- Sönglað á göngu (Text: Valgarður Egilsson)
- Þjóðvísa (Text: Tómas Guðmundsson)
- Únglíngurinn í skóginum (Text: Halldór Kiljan Laxness)
- Varpaljóð á Hörpu (Text: Jakobína Sigurðardóttir)
- Við Kínafljót (Text: Þorgeir Sveinbjarnarson)
- Vökuró (Text: Jakobína Sigurðardóttir) (covered by Björk on her album Medúlla)
- Vorljóð á Ýli (Text: Jakobína Sigurðardóttir)
- Það á að gefa börnum brauð (Text: Folk poetry)
- Vort líf (Text: Aðalsteinn Kristmundsson)

== Selected recordings ==
- Únglíngurinn í skóginum: Songs. Þóra Einarsdóttir, Elín Ósk Óskarsdóttir, Jón Þorsteinsson, Loftur Erlingsson, Gerrit Schuil. Smekkleysa 1998.
- Slátta. Steinunn Birna Ragnarsdóttir, Iceland Symphony Orchestra, Lovísa Fjeldsted, Valgerður Andrésdóttir, Laufey Sigurðardóttir, Selma Guðmundsdóttir. Smekkleysa 2000.
- Fljúga hvítu fiðrildin. Þuríður Pálsdóttir and Jórunn Viðar. Smekkleysa 2001.
- Mansöngur (Eldur, Ólafur liljurós, Mansöngur fyrir Ólafs rímu Grænlendings). Iceland Symphony Orchestra, The Hamrahlíð Choir, dir. Þorgerður Ingólfsdóttir, Árni Heimir Ingólfsson, piano. Smekkleysa 2002.
- Jórunn Viðar: Songs. Erla Dóra Vogler, Eva Þyri Hilmarsdóttir. 2018.
- Eldur and Ólafur Liljurós. Icelandic Works for the Stage. Iceland Symphony Orchestra, dir. Rumon Gamba. Chandos 2023.
