= Einar Hákonarson =

Icelandic painter

- Born: Einar Ingvar Hákonarson; 14 January 1945 (79); Reykjavík, Iceland
- Education: Myndlista- og handíðaskóli Íslands (MHÍ) [e. National Art School of Iceland], Valand School of Fine Arts
- Known for: painting, printmaking, sculpture, drawing, mosaic, enamels, stained glass
- Movement: Figurative art, Expressionism
- Website: www.einarhakonarson.com

Einar Hákonarson (born 14 January 1945, in Reykjavík, Iceland) is one of Iceland's best known artists. He is an expressionistic and figurative painter who brought the figure back into Icelandic painting in 1968. He is a pioneer in the Icelandic art scene and art education. He has been called “The crusader of the painting”, due to his involvement in those conflicts many Icelandic painters have had with the public fine art centers over the last 20 years.

== Early life ==
Einar Hákonarson was raised in Kleppsholt, Reykjavík. He started to paint and draw at a very young age. His father was a part-time artist and his 2 uncles were avid art lovers which was uncommon at that time in Iceland. Einar was only 15 years old when he was accepted to The National Art School of Iceland. There he received his education for the next 4 years following which he went abroad to Gothenburg Sweden and to study at Valand School of Fine Arts where he received influence from new modes of art and was influenced by figurative painting. Whilst Einar was still studying in Sweden he won the Nordic countries art prize after an exhibition in the Louisiana Museum of Modern Art in Copenhagen, Denmark. He won a prize in Buenos Aires, Argentina, for his printmaking, and an international printmaking prize in Ljubljana, former Yugoslavia, for a series of pictures after a trip to the German concentration camp of Auschwitz in Poland.

== Art ==
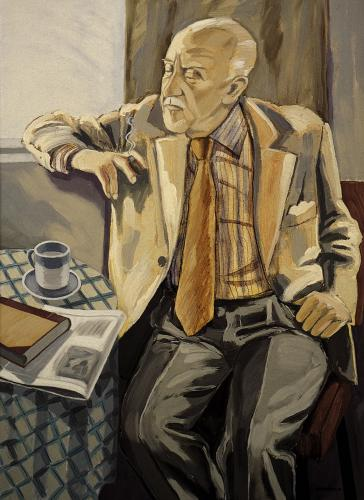
Halldór Laxness portrait by Einar Hákonarson

Einar returned to Iceland after his education and held his first solo exhibition in Bogasalur Reykjavík 1968. His show distinguished itself from its Icelandic art scene then current as Einar's paintings were pop, figurative and expressionistic. This exhibition brought the figure back into the Icelandic painting, which had been dominated by the abstract art for years.

Einar has always been consistent in his art and his values. He paints in oil on canvas but also works with other mediums like printmaking, sculpture, stained glass, enamels and mosaic. The human in its environment has been a visible thread through his 40-year career. Einar claims that he gets more influenced by feeling for nature, rather than by trying to paint a specific part of it. In his work can be seen different kinds of focus, for example on city life and the modern family unit. He has done a series about The Icelandic sagas, the Holocaust and communism, to name but a few. Religious themes are common in Einar's art and he frequently makes pictures from the Bible.

In later years Einar's painting style has become loosed from the strict style at the beginning of his career, but without having abandoned a disciplined composition. Apart from Iceland, Einar has lived in Sweden (7 years on and off) and for shorter periods in USA, Germany, and the Czech Republic. Einar is one of the principal portrait painters in Iceland. He has painted some of the most influential people of the nation, from politicians to national poets and artists. His work can be found in large numbers in official buildings, for example schools, banks, churches and the Icelandic parliament. Einar has held over 30 solo exhibitions and numerous group exhibitions.

=== Printmaking ===
Einar has won international awards for his printmaking. He was the first Icelandic artist to exhibit only printmaking in an art show (1968) and to publish printmaking folders (Icelandic sagas). He was a driving force in founding The Icelandic Printmaking Association in 1969 and its first president. Later Einar founded the printmaking department in The National Art School (MHÍ) when he became its director. Einar has also decorated numerous books with his printmaking.

=== Teaching ===
Einar was only 21 years old when he started teaching in the National Art School of Iceland. He grew a beard, since he was younger than most of his students, and has kept it ever since. Einar founded an art school in 1970 (Myndsýn) with his colleague Ingiberg Magnússon. Einar was appointed director of The National Art school of Iceland in 1978, then 33 years of age. He founded the department of printmaking and the department of sculpture, which did not exist in Iceland before and reconstructed the department of ceramics. Einar has held many art workshops and seminars through his career. He held teaching positions in Sweden, Valand School of Fine Arts (1964–1967), Hovedskou art School (1989–1991) and Domens Art School (2000–2002).

== The painters' conflict ==
In the 1990s, painters in Iceland became discontent with the public exhibition rooms. They felt that the painting was totally left out in the Icelandic art world, and the directors of the National galleries only focused on conceptual art. The painting was even declared dead by some of the country's art historians. Einar said Icelandic painters had not had a public place to show their work in 20 years. Einar, who previously was the artistic counselor of the City Museum (Kjarvalstadir), became the most energetic spokesman of the Icelandic painting and its right of existence in the Public museums, to this date.

== The Art Center ==
In 1997 Einar Hákonarson built, the first private owned cultural center in Iceland. The Art Center (Listaskalinn in Hveragerdi) was a 1000 square meters multi-cultural center, with the main focus on fine art and the art Einar felt was left out in the public art centers. The Art Center produced over 20 exhibitions of paintings and sculptures, together with numerous concerts, theater performances, poetry and book readings. Some of the exhibitions were the most attended in Iceland's fine art history to date. Einar said ”Finally there is a place for painters and other artists who do not fit into the governmental art, run by its long lasting directors”. But the pioneering drive could not cope with the loan system of its time, or politics. The Art Center went under after 2 active years.

=== Loss of the Art Center ===
The loss of the Art Center was bigger than most people know. Iceland's biggest art collector Sonja Sorillo wanted to get The Art Center to house 100 of her collected art works, including works of Picasso, Matisse, Bacon, De Kooning and Pollock. That fell through when The Art Center was sold in an auction to The West Nordic Fund. No international art collection exists in Iceland like Mrs. Sorillo's. Her collection was broken up and sold abroad after her death. The Art Center was then sold to The Arnesinga Art Museum (Museum of the region) who had previously declined any collaboration with Hákonarson's Art Center.

=== The Painters House ===
Einar lost his home and all of his possessions with the downfall of The Art Center. But he stood up after being knocked down and started The Painters House in 2002, a non profitable exhibition place with co painter Haukur Dór. Later, another painter, Óli G took Dor's place and 19 exhibitions were made in two years.

Einar opened an unusual exhibition in the so-called “Cultural night” in Reykjavík 2005. He put up 600 square meters tents and showed 90 paintings in the city centers park, to demonstrate the exclusion of the painting in the public art centers for the last 20 years. He called the show “In the Grass Root”. What followed is unheard of in the Icelandic art history. 3000 people (1% of the country's population) attended the exhibition in one day and showed their support in Einar and the Icelandic painting. After this show, Icelandic painters formed a group to push for more democracy in the Public art world. This struggle continues to date.

== Cultural scene ==
Einar has held various prominent positions in the Icelandic art world, where he has been active in promoting Icelandic art nationally and internationally. He was the artistic counselor of Kjarvalstadir, The City Gallery of Reykjavík 1987–1988 and a chairman of many exhibition committees. He designed and directed the exhibition of The History of Iceland, on Iceland's 1100 birthday in 1974. He was a deputy to the mayor in the governing body of the Hässelby Slott, cultural site of the Nordic capital cities 1982–1992.

Einar Hákonarson lives in Hólmavík with his wife Sólveig Hjalmarsdottir. He works in Reykjavík. (2007)

== Notes ==
=== Resources ===
- Morgunblaðið 19.8 2005 http://www.einarhakonarson.com/media/articles-2000-part2.pdf
- Morgunblaðið 7.6 1966 http://www.einarhakonarson.com/media/articles-60s-part4.pdf
- Handels Tindningen 15.12 1966 http://www.einarhakonarson.com/media/articles-60s-part3.pdf
- Morgunblaðið http://www.einarhakonarson.com/media/articles-60s-part2.pdf
- Visir 23.3 1968 http://www.einarhakonarson.com/media/articles-60s-part1.pdf.
- RÚV (Icelandic state TV) interviews 1976 http://www.einarhakonarson.com/media.html.
- Morgunblaðið http://www.einarhakonarson.com/media/articles-80s-part1.pdf
- Morgunblaðið 4.10 2003 http://www.einarhakonarson.com/media/articles-2000-part1.pdf
- Morgunblaðið 17.11 1968 http://www.einarhakonarson.com/media/articles-70s-part4.pdf
- The Icelandic Printmakers Association https://web.archive.org/web/20080518033555/http://www.islenskgrafik.is/page1/page15/page15.html
- Morgunblaðið 17.9 197 http://www.einarhakonarson.com/media/articles-70s-part1.pdf
- Morgunblaðið 7.9 2002 http://www.einarhakonarson.com/media/articles-90s-part1.pdf
- Morgunblaðið 19.8 1997 http://www.einarhakonarson.com/media/articles-90s-part3.pdf
