= Iceland =

Island country in the Atlantic Ocean

Iceland Ísland
- Flag Coat of arms
- Anthem: Ó Guð vors lands "O God of Our Land"
- Location of Iceland (dark green)
- Capital and largest city: Reykjavík; 64°08′N 21°56′W
- Official language: Icelandic
- Ethnic groups (2021) (Note: By country of citizenship): 86% Icelandic; 6% Polish; 1% Lithuanian; 0.8% Filipino; 7% other
- Religion (2026): 67.2% Christianity; 56.3% Church of Iceland (official) (Note: The Constitution of Iceland confirms the Church of Iceland as the state church of Iceland.); 10.9% other Christian; 32.8% other or no religion
- Demonyms: Icelander; Icelandic
- Government: Unitary parliamentary republic
  - President: Halla Tómasdóttir
  - Prime Minister: Kristrún Frostadóttir
  - Speaker of the Althing: Þórunn Sveinbjarnardóttir
- Legislature: Althing

Formation
  - Settlement: 9th century
  - Commonwealth: 930–1262
  - Union with Norway: 1262–1397
  - Kalmar Union: 1397–1523
  - Denmark–Norway: 1523–1814
  - Unification with Denmark: 14 January 1814
  - Constitution and limited home rule: 5 January 1874
  - Extended home rule: 1 February 1904
  - Sovereignty and personal union with Denmark: 1 December 1918
  - Republic: 17 June 1944; 82 years ago

Area
  - Total: 103,125 km^{2} (39,817 sq mi) (106th)
  - Water (%): 2.07 (as of 2015)

Population
  - 2026 census: ▲394,324 (172nd)
  - Density: 3.82/km^{2} (9.9/sq mi) (238th)
- GDP (PPP): 2025 estimate
  - Total: ▲$31.076 billion (153rd)
  - Per capita: ▲$81,220 (14th)
- GDP (nominal): 2025 estimate
  - Total: ▲$35.310 billion (105th)
  - Per capita: ▲$90,280 (5th)
- Gini (2018): ▼23.2 low inequality
- HDI (2023): ▲0.972 very high (1st)
- Currency: Icelandic króna (ISK)
- Time zone: UTC±00:00 (GMT/WET)
- Date format: dd.mm.yyyy
- Calling code: +354
- ISO 3166 code: IS
- Internet TLD: .is

Iceland (Note: Icelandic: Ísland, pronounced [ˈistlant] (Note: Although "Republic of Iceland" is found in some documents, the name does not have official status. Interinstitutional Style Guide of the European Union, Annex A5.)) is a Nordic island country between the Arctic Ocean and the North Atlantic Ocean, located on the Mid-Atlantic Ridge between Europe and North America. It is Europe's westernmost and most sparsely populated country. Its capital and largest city is Reykjavík, which is home to about 35% of the country's roughly 395,000 residents (excluding nearby towns/suburbs, which are separate municipalities and contribute a further substantial percentage). The official language of the country is Icelandic. Iceland is on a rift between tectonic plates, and its geologic activity includes geysers and frequent volcanic eruptions. The interior consists of a volcanic plateau with sand and lava fields, mountains and glaciers, and many glacial rivers flow to the sea through the lowlands. Iceland is warmed by the Gulf Stream and has a temperate climate, despite being at a latitude just south of the Arctic Circle. Its latitude and marine influence keep summers chilly, and most of its islands have a polar climate.

According to the Landnámabók, an ancient manuscript, the settlement of Iceland began in 874 AD, when the Norwegian chieftain Ingólfr Arnarson became the island's first permanent settler. In following centuries, Norwegians and to a lesser extent other Scandinavians, migrated to Iceland, bringing with them thralls (i.e., slaves or serfs) of Gaelic origin. The island was governed as an independent commonwealth under the native parliament, the Althing, one of the world's oldest functioning legislative assemblies. After a period of civil strife, Iceland acceded to Norwegian rule in the 13th century. In 1397, Iceland followed Norway's integration into the Kalmar Union along with the kingdoms of Denmark and Sweden, coming under de facto Danish rule upon its dissolution in 1523. The Danish kingdom introduced Lutheranism by force in 1550, and the Treaty of Kiel formally retained Iceland within Denmark in 1814.

Influenced by ideals of nationalism after the French Revolution, Iceland's struggle for independence took shape, culminating with the Danish–Icelandic Act of Union in 1918, and the establishment of the Kingdom of Iceland, sharing through a personal union the incumbent monarch of Denmark. During the occupation of Denmark in World War II, Iceland voted overwhelmingly to become a republic in 1944, ending its remaining formal ties to Denmark. Although the Althing was suspended from 1799 to 1845, Iceland nevertheless has a claim to sustaining one of the world's longest-running parliaments. Until the 20th century, Iceland relied largely on subsistence fishing and agriculture. Industrialisation of the fisheries and Marshall Plan aid after World War II brought prosperity, and Iceland became one of the world's wealthiest and most developed nations. In 1950, Iceland joined the Council of Europe. In 1994 it became a part of the European Economic Area, further diversifying its economy into sectors such as finance, biotechnology, and manufacturing.

Iceland has a market economy with relatively low taxes, compared to other OECD countries, as well as the highest trade union membership in the world. It maintains a Nordic social welfare system that provides universal health care and tertiary education. Iceland ranks highly in international comparisons of national performance, such as quality of life, education, protection of civil liberties, government transparency, and economic freedom. It has the smallest population of any NATO member and is the only one with no standing army, possessing only a lightly armed coast guard.

== Etymology ==
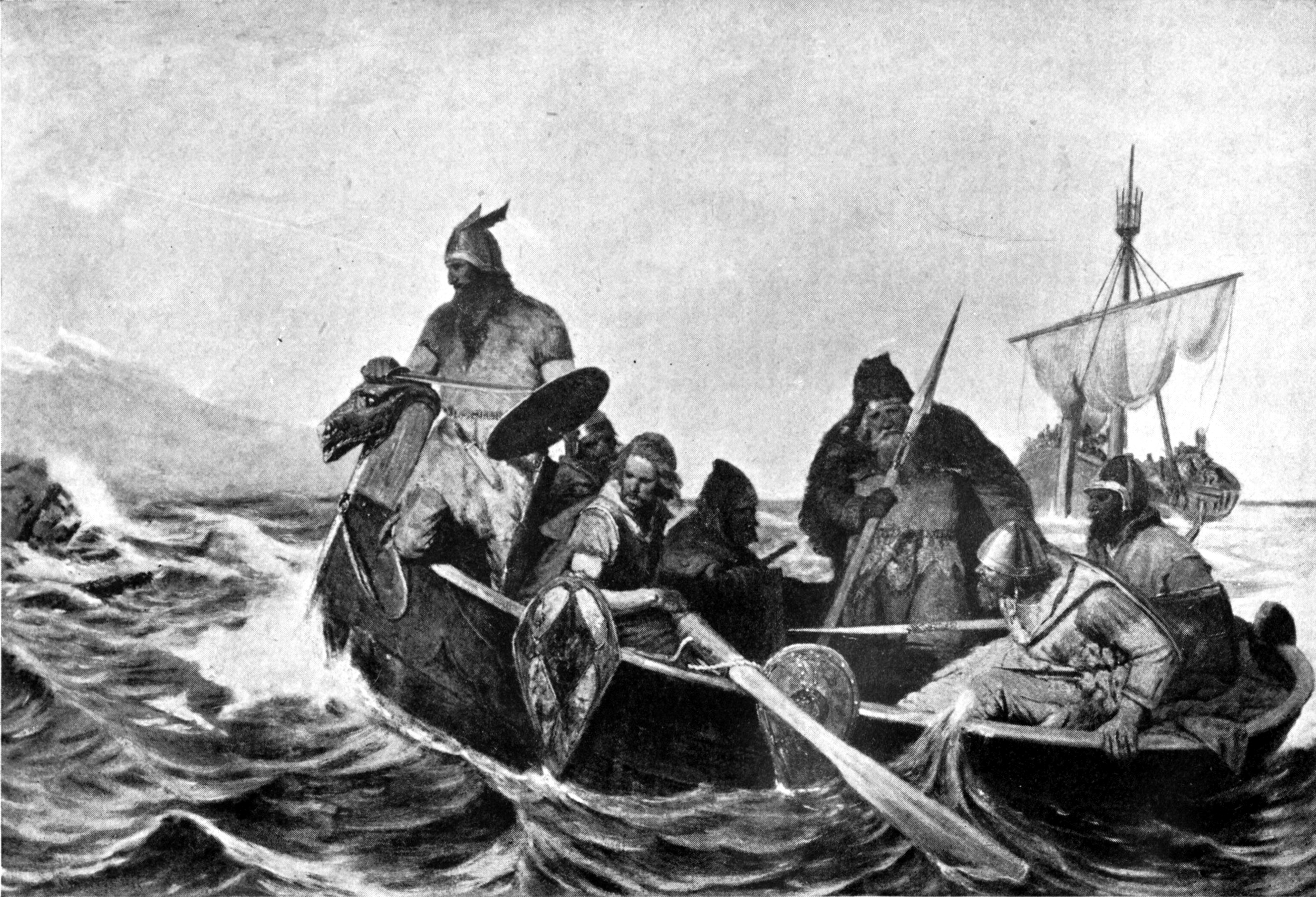
Norsemen landing in Iceland – a 19th-century depiction by Oscar Wergeland

The Landnámabók names Naddodd (Old Norse: Naddoðr) as the first Norseman to reach Iceland in the ninth century, having gotten lost while sailing from Norway to the Faroe Islands. He gave the island its first name of Snæland (English: Snowland). The second explorer to arrive was the Swedish Garðar Svavarsson, who circumnavigated the island and named it Garðarshólmur (English: Garðar's Isle) after himself.

The island's present name originated from Flóki Vilgerðarson, the first Norseman to intentionally travel to Iceland. According to the Sagas of Icelanders, Flóki coined the name after he climbed a mountain, despondent after a harsh winter in present-day Vatnsfjörður, and saw an ice cap. The notion that Iceland's settlers chose that name to discourage competing settlements is most likely a myth.

== History ==
=== 874–1262: settlement and Commonwealth ===
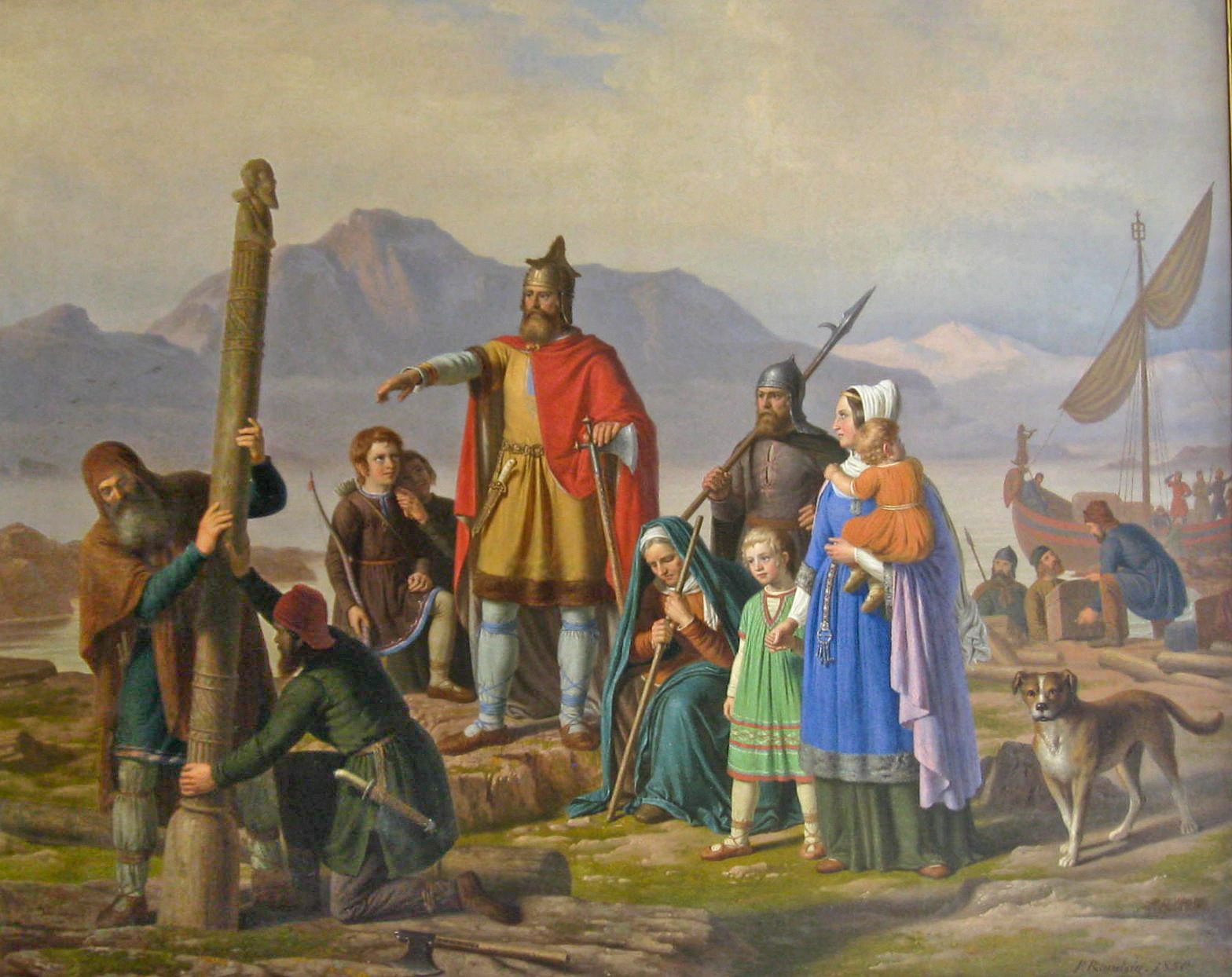
Ingólfr Arnarson (modern Icelandic: Ingólfur Arnarson), the first permanent Scandinavian settler

According to both Landnámabók and Íslendingabók, monks known as the Papar lived in Iceland before Scandinavian settlers arrived, possibly members of a Hiberno-Scottish mission. An archaeological excavation has revealed the ruins of a cabin in Hafnir on the Reykjanes peninsula. Carbon dating indicates that it was abandoned sometime between 770 and 880. In 2016, archaeologists uncovered a longhouse in Stöðvarfjörður that may date to as early as 800.

Swedish Viking explorer Garðar Svavarsson was the first to circumnavigate Iceland in 870, and established that it was an island. He stayed during the winter and built a house in Húsavík. Garðar departed the following summer, but one of his men, Náttfari, decided to stay behind with two slaves. Náttfari settled in what is now known as Náttfaravík, and he and his slaves became the first documented permanent residents of Iceland.

The Norwegian-Norse chieftain Ingólfr Arnarson built his homestead in present-day Reykjavík in 874. Ingólfr was followed by many other emigrant settlers, largely Scandinavians and their thralls, many of whom were Irish or Scottish. By 930, most arable land on the island had been claimed; the Althing, a legislative and judicial assembly, was initiated to regulate the Icelandic Commonwealth. The lack of arable land also served as an impetus to the settlement of Greenland starting in 986. The period of these early settlements coincided with the Medieval Warm Period, when temperatures were similar to those of the early 20th century. At that time, about 25% of Iceland was covered with forest, compared to 1% in the present day. Christianity was adopted by consensus around 999–1000, although Norse paganism persisted among segments of the population for some years afterward.

=== Iceland as a possession ===
==== Middle Ages ====
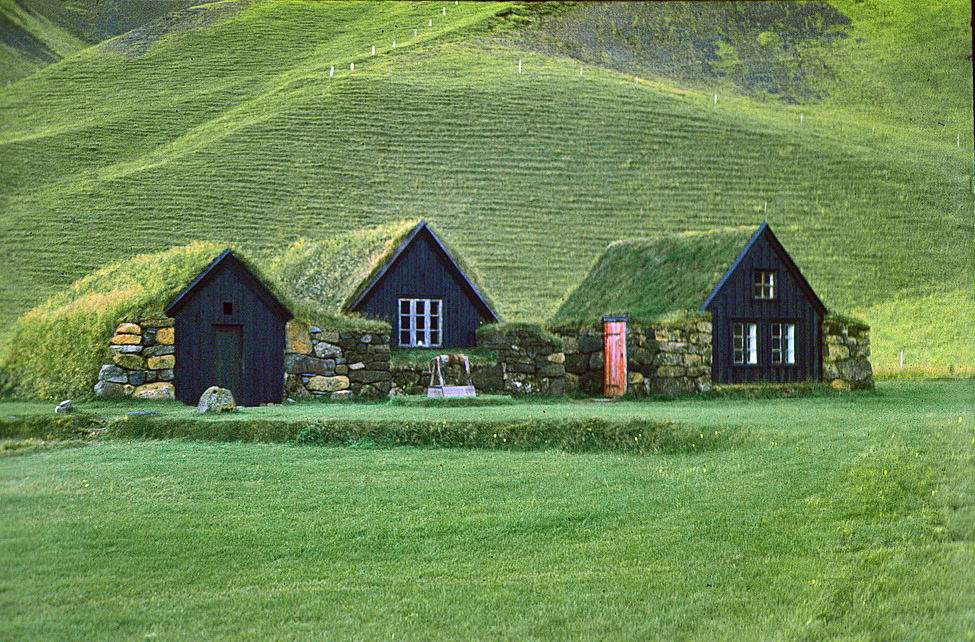
Turf houses have been constructed since Iceland was settled in the 9th century.

The Icelandic Commonwealth, established in the 10th century, faced internal strife during the Age of the Sturlungs (c. 1220–1264). This period was marked by violent conflicts among chieftains, notably the Sturlung family, leading to the weakening of the Commonwealth's political structure. The culmination of the struggles was the signing of the Old Covenant (Gamli sáttmáli) in 1262–1264, bringing Iceland under Norwegian rule.

Environmental challenges further impacted medieval Icelandic society. Upon settlement, approximately 25–40% of Iceland was forested. However, extensive deforestation occurred as forests were cleared for timber, firewood, and to create grazing land for livestock. This led to significant soil erosion and a decline in arable land, exacerbating the difficulties of sustaining agriculture in Iceland's harsh climate. Agriculture during this period was predominantly pastoral, focusing on livestock such as sheep, cattle, and horses. While early settlers cultivated barley, the cooling climate from the 12th century onwards made grain cultivation increasingly difficult. The Little Ice Age began around 1300, bringing colder and more unpredictable weather, further shortening growing seasons and making farming more challenging.

The Black Death reached Iceland in 1402–1404 and again in 1494–1495, with devastating effects. The first outbreak is estimated to have killed 50–60% of the population, while the second resulted in a 30–50% mortality rate. These pandemics significantly reduced the population, leading to social and economic disruptions.

In 1380, after the death of Haakon VI, his son Olaf II of Denmark succeeded to the Norwegian throne, uniting the crowns of Denmark and Norway under one monarch. Because Iceland was part of the Norwegian realm, it thereby came under the Danish-Norwegian crown. In 1397, the Kalmar Union brought Denmark, Norway, and Sweden under a single monarch.

==== Reformation and the Early Modern period ====
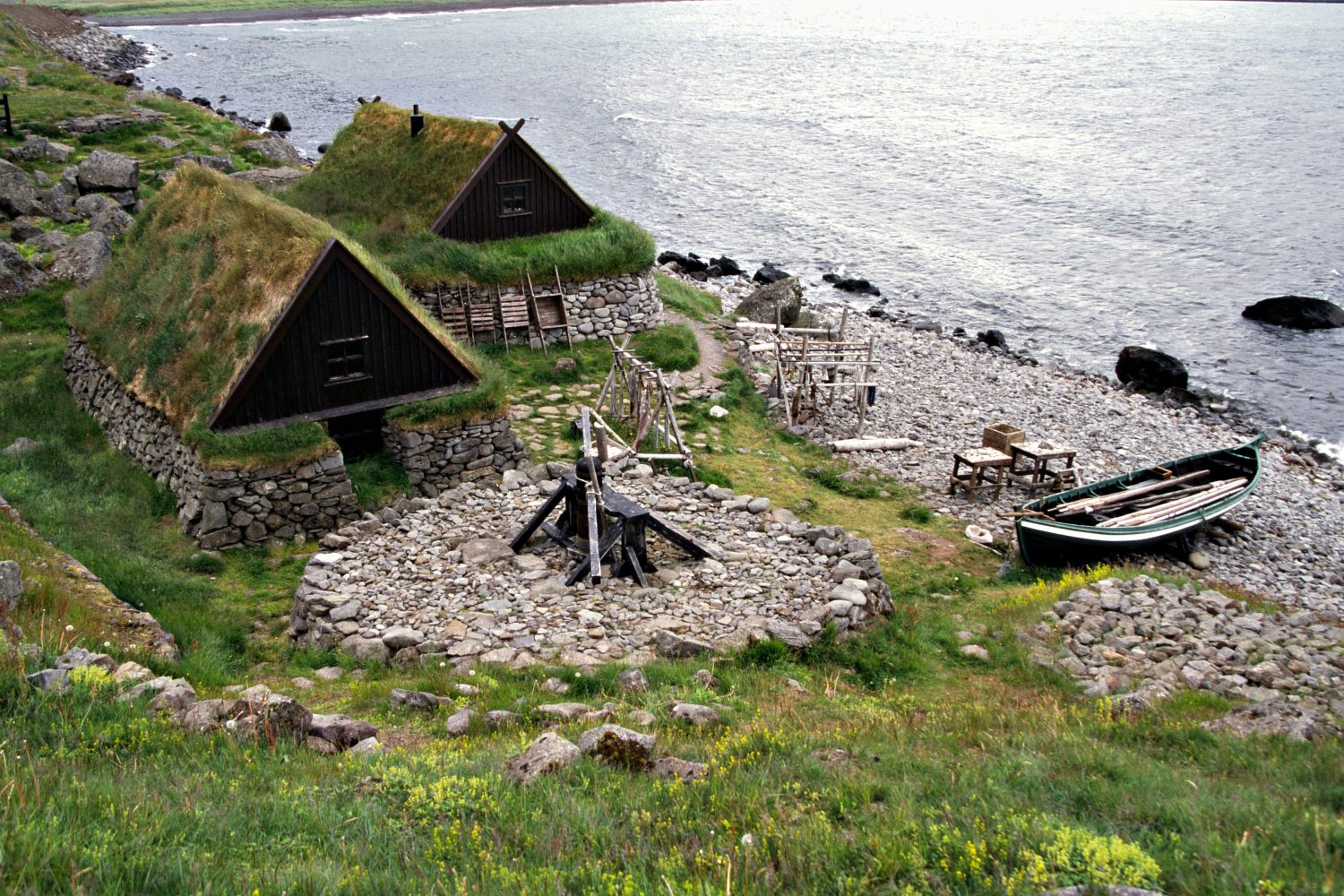
Ósvör, a replica of an old fishing outpost outside Bolungarvík

Around the middle of the 16th century, as part of the Protestant Reformation, King Christian III of Denmark began to impose Lutheranism on all his subjects. Jón Arason, the last Icelandic Catholic bishop, and two of his sons were beheaded in 1550. Iceland then became officially Lutheran, and Lutheranism has since remained the dominant religion.

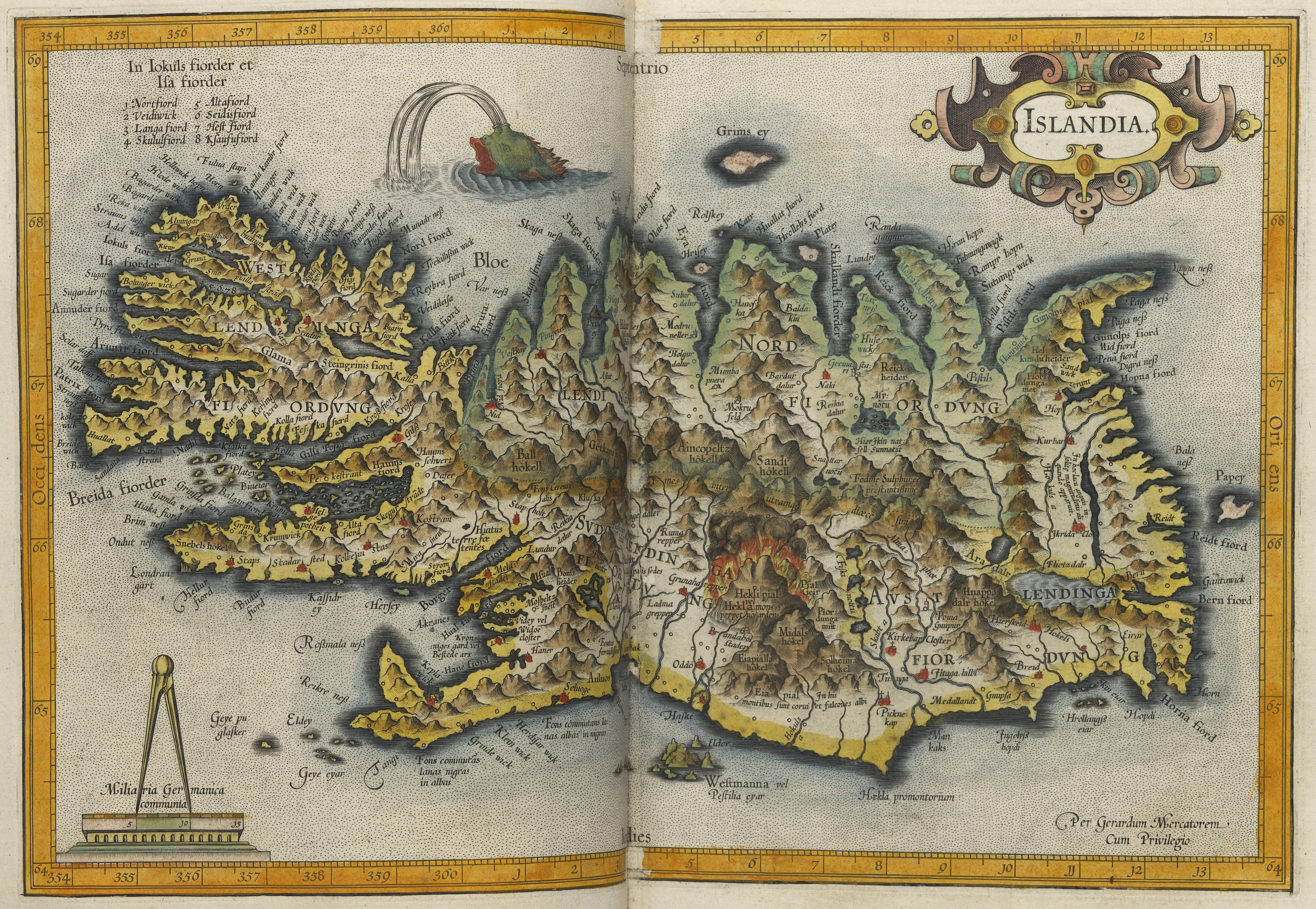
A map of Iceland published in the early 17th century by Gerardus Mercator

In the 17th and 18th centuries, Denmark imposed harsh trade restrictions on Iceland. Natural disasters, including volcanic eruptions and disease, contributed to a decreasing population. In the summer of 1627, Barbary Pirates committed the events known locally as the Turkish Abductions, in which hundreds of residents were taken into slavery in North Africa and dozens killed; this was the only invasion in Icelandic history to have caused casualties. The 1707–08 Iceland smallpox epidemic is estimated to have killed a quarter to a third of the population. In 1783 the Laki volcano erupted, with devastating effects. In the years following the eruption, known as the Mist Hardships (Icelandic: Móðuharðindin), over half of all livestock in the country died. Around a quarter of the population starved to death in the ensuing famine.

==== 1814–1918: independence movement ====
After the Napoleonic Wars in 1814, Denmark-Norway broke up into two separate kingdoms under the Treaty of Kiel, but Iceland remained a Danish dependency. Throughout the 19th century, the country's climate continued to grow colder, resulting in mass emigration to the New World, particularly to the region of Gimli, Manitoba in Canada, which was sometimes referred to as New Iceland. About 15,000 people emigrated out of a total population of 70,000.

A national consciousness arose in the first half of the 19th century, inspired by romantic and nationalist ideas from mainland Europe. An Icelandic independence movement took shape in the 1850s under the leadership of Jón Sigurðsson, based on the burgeoning Icelandic nationalism inspired by the Fjölnismenn and other Danish-educated Icelandic intellectuals. In 1874, poet and clergyman Matthías Jochumsson wrote the lyrics of "Lofsöngur", which became the Icelandic national anthem. Composer Sveinbjörn Sveinbjörnsson wrote the music.

In 1874, Denmark granted Iceland a constitution and limited home rule. That was expanded in 1904, and Hannes Hafstein served as the first Minister for Iceland in the Danish cabinet.

=== 1918–1944: independence and the Kingdom of Iceland ===
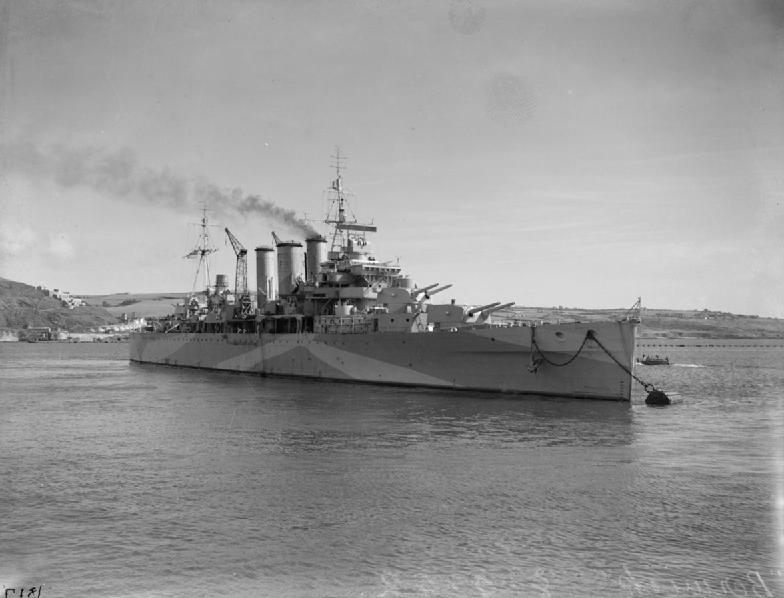
HMS Berwick led the British invasion of Iceland.

The Danish–Icelandic Act of Union, an agreement with Denmark signed on 1 December 1918 and valid for 25 years, recognised Iceland as a fully sovereign and independent state in a personal union with Denmark. The Government of Iceland established an embassy in Copenhagen and requested that Denmark carry out on its behalf certain defence and foreign affairs matters, subject to consultation with the Althing. Danish embassies around the world displayed two coats of arms and two flags: those of the Kingdom of Denmark and those of the Kingdom of Iceland. Iceland's legal position became comparable to those of countries belonging to the Commonwealth of Nations, such as Canada, whose sovereign is King Charles III.

During World War II, Iceland joined Denmark in asserting neutrality. After the German occupation of Denmark on 9 April 1940, the Althing replaced the king with a regent and declared that the Icelandic government would take control of its own defence and foreign affairs. A month later, British armed forces conducted Operation Fork, the invasion and occupation of the country, violating Icelandic neutrality. In 1941, the Government of Iceland, friendly to Britain, invited the United States, then neutral, to take over its defence so that Britain could use its troops elsewhere.

=== 1944–present: Republic of Iceland ===
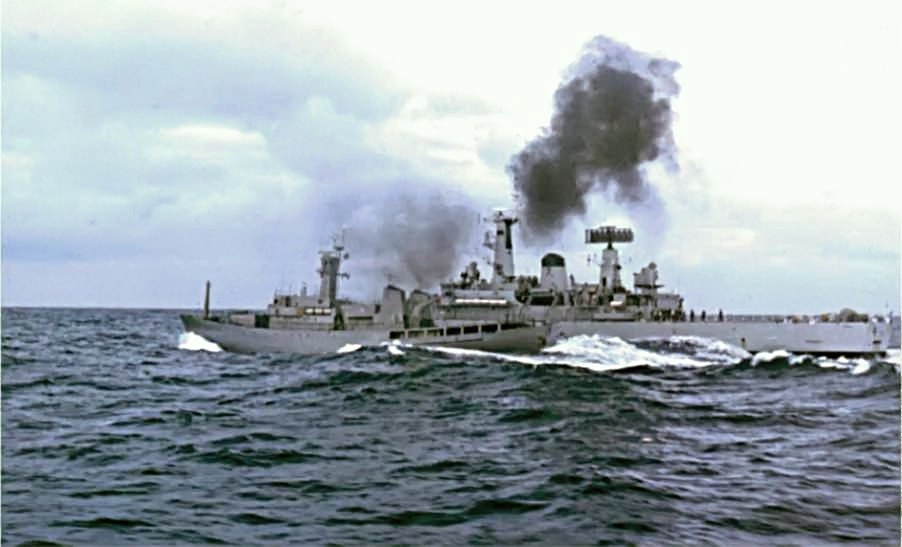
A British warship, HMS Scylla (right), collides with Icelandic coast guard vessel ICGV Óðinn in the Atlantic Ocean during the Third Cod War.

On 31 December 1943, the Danish–Icelandic Act of Union expired after 25 years. Beginning on 20 May 1944, Icelanders voted in a four-day plebiscite on whether to terminate the personal union with Denmark, abolish the monarchy, and establish a republic. The vote was 97% to end the union, and 95% in favour of the new republican constitution. Iceland formally became a republic on 17 June 1944, with Sveinn Björnsson as its first president.

In 1946, the US Defense Force left Iceland. The nation formally became a member of NATO on 30 March 1949, amid domestic controversy and riots. On 5 May 1951, a defence agreement was signed with the United States. American troops returned to Iceland as the Iceland Defence Force and remained throughout the Cold War. The US withdrew the last of its forces on 30 September 2006.

Iceland prospered during the Second World War. The immediate post-war period was followed by substantial economic growth, driven by the industrialisation of the fishing industry and the US Marshall Plan program, through which Icelanders received the most aid per capita of any European country (at US$209, with war-ravaged Netherlands a distant second at US$109). Vigdís Finnbogadóttir assumed Iceland's presidency on 1 August 1980, making her the first elected female head of state in the world.

The 1970s were marked by the Cod Wars, which were several disputes with the United Kingdom over Iceland's extension of its fishing limits to 200 nmi (370 km) offshore. Iceland hosted a summit in Reykjavík in 1986 between United States President Ronald Reagan and Soviet Premier Mikhail Gorbachev, during which they took significant steps towards nuclear disarmament. A few years later, Iceland became the first country to recognise the independence of Estonia, Latvia, and Lithuania as they broke away from the USSR. Throughout the 1990s, the country expanded its international role and developed a foreign policy oriented towards humanitarian and peacekeeping causes. To that end, Iceland provided aid and expertise to various NATO-led interventions in Bosnia, Kosovo, and Iraq.

Iceland joined the European Economic Area in 1994, after which the economy was greatly diversified and liberalised. International economic relations increased further after 2001 when Iceland's newly deregulated banks began to raise great amounts of external debt, contributing to a 32 per cent increase in Iceland's gross national income between 2002 and 2007.

==== Economic boom and crisis ====
In 2003–2007, after the privatisation of the banking sector under the government of Davíð Oddsson, Iceland moved towards having an economy based on international investment banking and financial services. It was quickly becoming one of the most prosperous countries in the world, but was hit hard by a major financial crisis. The crisis resulted in the greatest migration from Iceland since 1887, with a net emigration of 5,000 people in 2009.

==== Since 2012 ====
Iceland's economy stabilised under the government of Jóhanna Sigurðardóttir, growing by 1.6% in 2012. The centre-right Independence Party was returned to power in coalition with the Progressive Party in the 2013 election. In the following years, Iceland benefited from a surge in tourism as the country became a popular holiday destination. In 2016, Prime Minister Sigmundur Davíð Gunnlaugsson resigned after being implicated in the Panama Papers scandal. Early elections in 2016 resulted in a right-wing coalition government of the Independence Party, Viðreisn and Bright Future. This government fell when Bright Future quit the coalition due to a scandal involving a letter of support for a convicted child sex offender from the father of Prime Minister Bjarni Benediktsson of the Independence Party. Snap elections in October 2017 brought to power a new coalition consisting of the Independence Party, the Progressive Party, and the Left-Green Movement, headed by Katrín Jakobsdóttir.

After the 2021 parliamentary election, the new government was, just like the previous government, a tri-party coalition of the Independence Party, the Progressive Party, and the Left-Green Movement, headed by Prime Minister Katrín Jakobsdóttir. In April 2024, Bjarni Benediktsson succeeded Katrín as prime minister. In a snap election in November 2024, the centre-left Social Democratic Alliance became the biggest party, and Social Democrat Kristrún Frostadóttir became the next Prime Minister of Iceland.

== Geography ==
General topographic map

Iceland is at the juncture of the Arctic Ocean and the North Atlantic Ocean. The main island is entirely south of the Arctic Circle, which passes through the small Icelandic island of Grímsey off the main island's northern coast. The country lies between latitudes 63 and 68°N, and longitudes 25 and 13°W.

Iceland is closer to continental Europe than to mainland North America, although it is closest to Greenland, an island of North America. Iceland is generally included in Europe for geographical, historical, political, cultural, linguistic, and practical reasons. Geologically, the island includes parts of both continental plates. The closest bodies of land in Europe are the Faroe Islands (420 km; 225 nmi); Jan Mayen Island (570 km; 310 nmi); Shetland and the Outer Hebrides, both about 740 km (400 nmi); and the Scottish mainland and Orkney, both about 750 km (405 nmi). The nearest part of Continental Europe is mainland Norway, about 970 km (525 nmi) away, while mainland North America is 2,070 km (1,120 nmi) away, at the northern tip of Labrador.

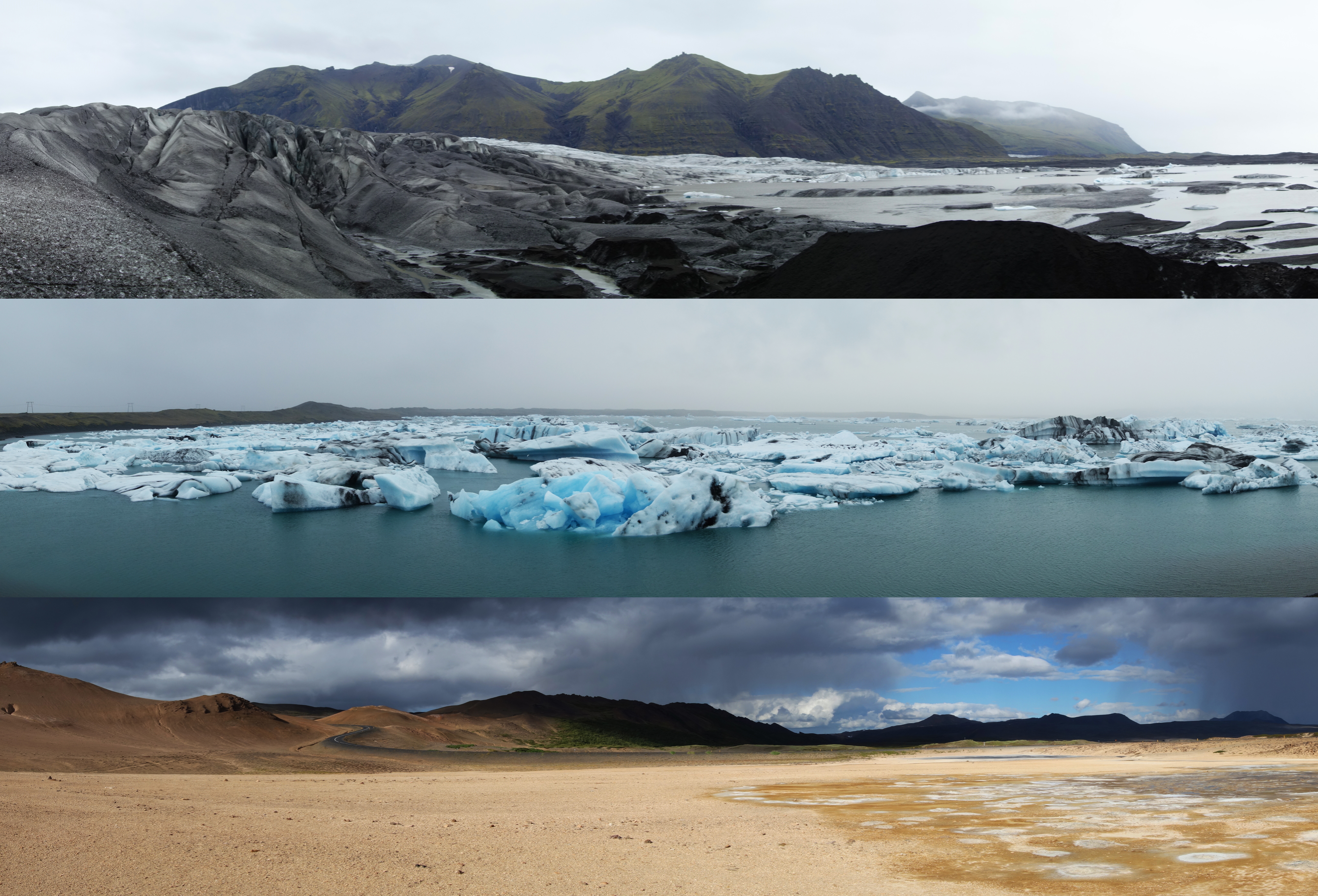
Three typical Icelandic landscapes

Iceland is the 18th-largest island in the world, and the second-largest island in Europe, smaller than Great Britain and bigger than Ireland. The main island covers 101,826 km^{2} (39,315 sq mi), but the entire country is 103,000 km^{2} (40,000 sq mi) in size, of which 62.7% is tundra. Iceland contains about 30 minor islands, including the lightly populated Grímsey and the Vestmannaeyjar archipelago. Lakes and glaciers cover 14.3% of its surface; only 23% is vegetated. The largest lakes are Þórisvatn reservoir: 83–88 km^{2} (32–34 sq mi) and Þingvallavatn: 82 km^{2} (32 sq mi); other important lakes include Lagarfljót and Mývatn. Jökulsárlón is the deepest lake, at 248 m (814 ft). Geologically, Iceland is a part of the Mid-Atlantic Ridge, a ridge along which the oceanic crust spreads and forms new crust. This part of the mid-ocean ridge is located above a mantle plume, causing Iceland to be subaerial (above the surface of the sea). The ridge marks the boundary between the Eurasian Plate and the North American Plate, and Iceland was created by rifting and accretion through volcanism along the ridge.

Many fjords punctuate Iceland's 4,970-kilometre-long (3,090 mi) coastline, which is also where most settlements are situated. The island's interior, the Highlands of Iceland, is a cold and uninhabitable combination of sand, mountains, and lava fields. The major towns are the capital city of Reykjavík, along with its outlying towns of Kópavogur, Hafnarfjörður, and Garðabær, nearby Reykjanesbær where the international airport is located, and the town of Akureyri in northern Iceland. The island of Grímsey on the Arctic Circle contains the northernmost habitation of Iceland, whereas Kolbeinsey contains the northernmost point of Iceland. Iceland has three national parks: Vatnajökull National Park, Snæfellsjökull National Park, and Þingvellir National Park. The country is considered a "strong performer" in environmental protection.

=== Geology ===
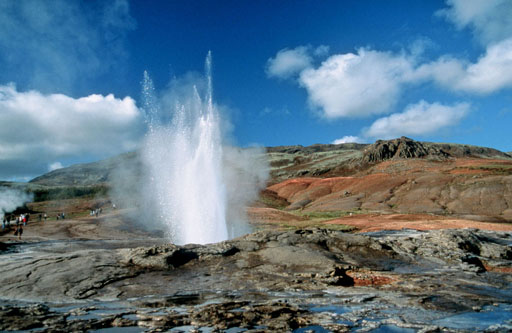
Geysir which is in Haukadalur valley, is shown erupting. It is the oldest known geyser in the world.

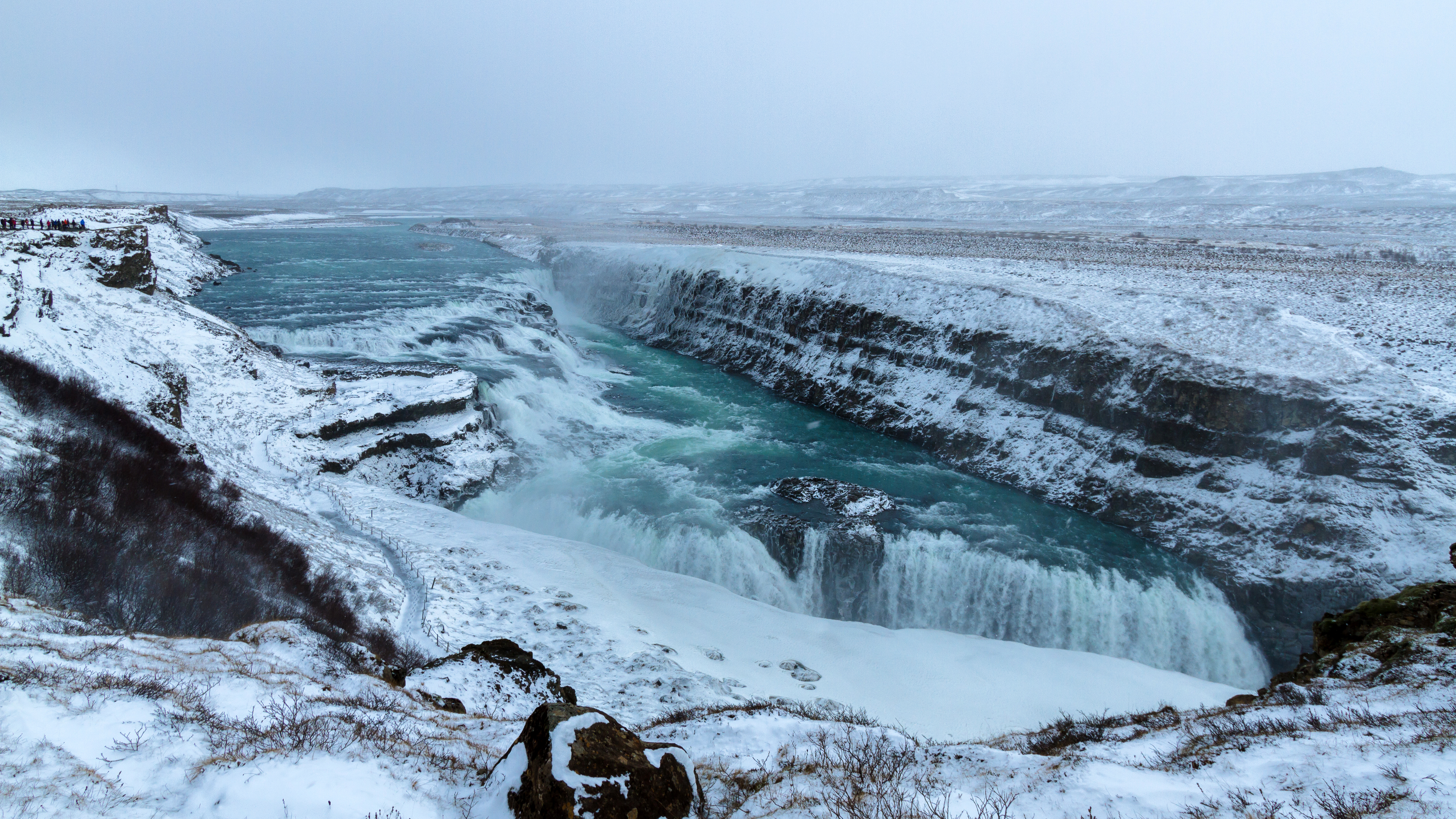
Gullfoss, an iconic waterfall of Iceland

Iceland is the only large insular landmass in the world which is located on a mid-ocean ridge above sea level. It is probably the only place in the world where the effects of two major tectonic plates drifting apart can easily be observed above sea level. The island sits directly on the Mid-Atlantic Ridge, where the Eurasian Plate and the North American Plate are moving away from each other.

A geologically young land at 16 to 18 million years old, Iceland is the surface expression of the Iceland Plateau, a large igneous province forming as a result of volcanism from the Iceland hotspot and along the Mid-Atlantic Ridge, the latter of which runs right through it. This means that the island is highly geologically active with many volcanoes including Hekla, Eldgjá, Herðubreið, and Eldfell. The volcanic eruption of Laki in 1783–1784 caused a famine that killed nearly a quarter of the island's population. In addition, the eruption caused dust clouds and haze to appear over most of Europe and parts of Africa and Asia for several months afterwards, and affected climates in other areas.

Iceland has many geysers, including Geysir, from which the English word is derived, and the famous Strokkur, which erupts every 8–10 minutes. After a phase of inactivity, Geysir started erupting again after a series of earthquakes in 2000. Geysir has since grown quieter and does not erupt often.

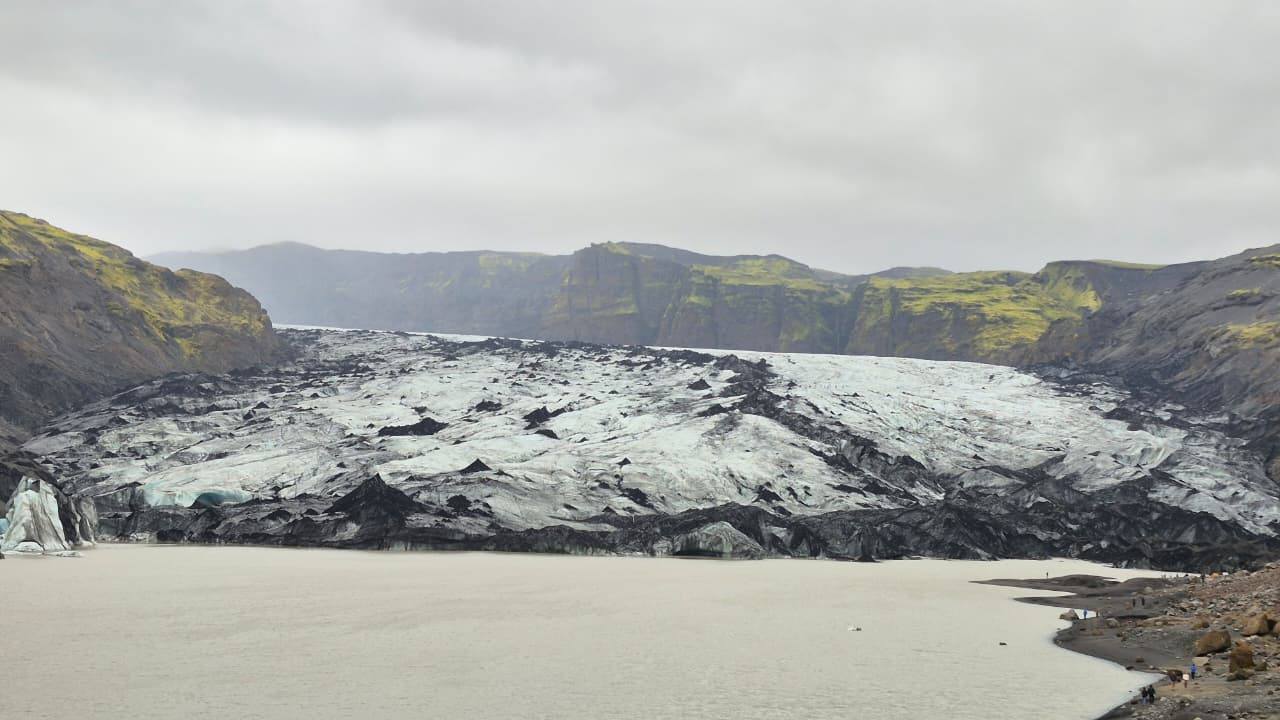
Sólheimajökull glacier

With the widespread availability of geothermal power and the harnessing of many rivers and waterfalls for hydroelectricity, most residents have access to inexpensive hot water, heating, and electricity. The island is composed primarily of basalt, a low-silica lava associated with effusive volcanism, as has also occurred in Hawaii. Iceland, however, has a variety of volcanic types (composite and fissure), many producing more evolved lavas such as rhyolite and andesite.

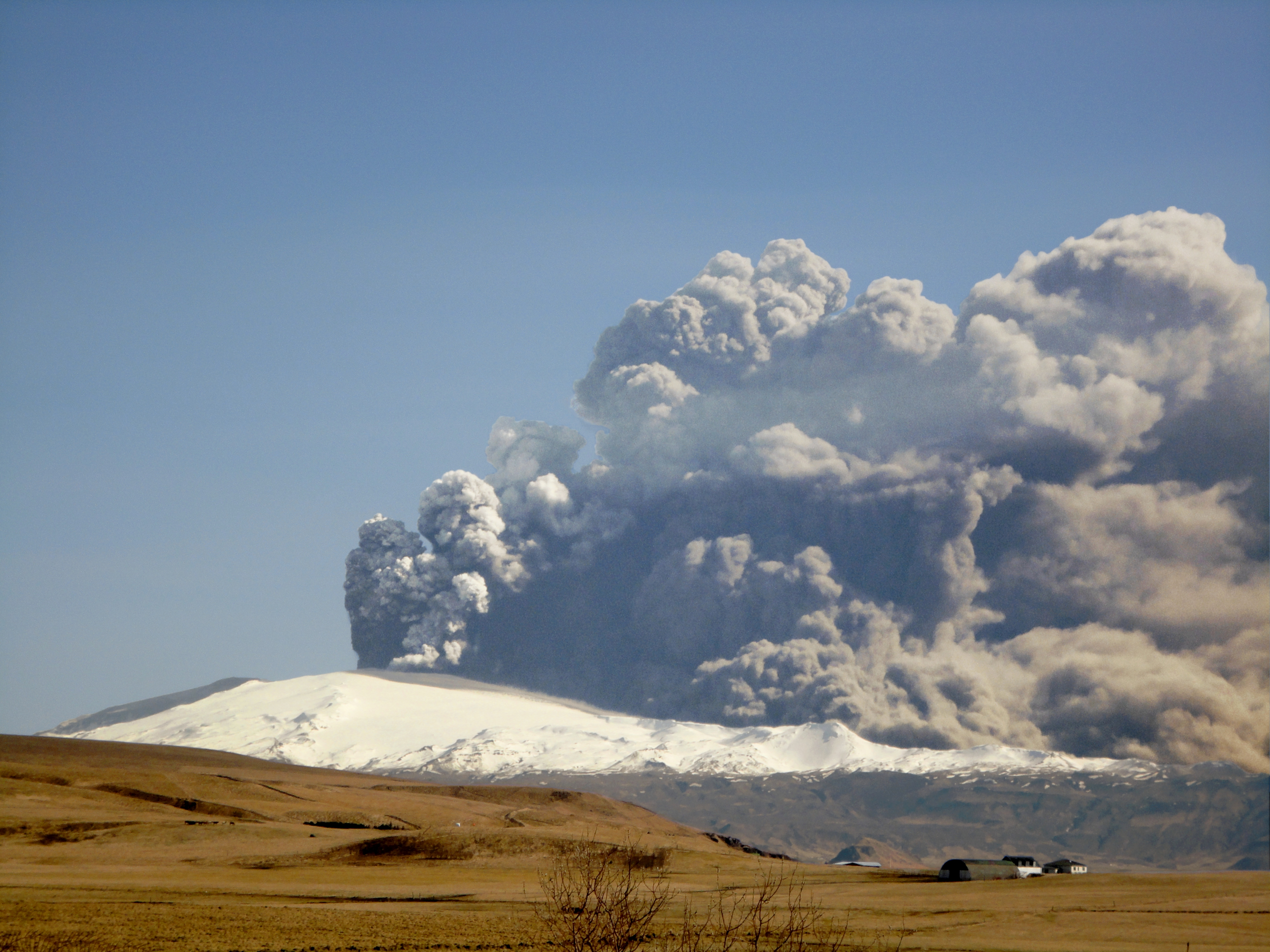
The eruption of Eyjafjallajökull

Surtsey, one of the youngest islands in the world, is part of Iceland. Named after Surtr, it rose above the ocean in a series of volcanic eruptions between 8 November 1963 and 5 June 1968. Only scientists researching the growth of new life are allowed to visit the island. Iceland has hundreds of volcanoes with about 30 active volcanic systems. Within each are volcano-tectonic fissure systems, and many, but not all of them, also have at least one central volcano (mostly in the form of a stratovolcano, sometimes of a shield volcano with a magma chamber underneath). Several classifications of the systems exist, for example there is one with 30 systems, and one with 34 systems, with the latter currently being used in Iceland itself.

=== Climate ===
Köppen climate classification types of Iceland

The climate of Iceland's coast is subarctic. The warm North Atlantic Current ensures generally higher annual temperatures than in most places of similar latitude in the world. Regions in the world with similar climates include the Aleutian Islands, the Alaska Peninsula, and Tierra del Fuego, although these regions are closer to the equator. Despite its proximity to the Arctic, the island's coasts remain ice-free through the winter. Ice incursions are rare, with the last having occurred on the north coast in 1969.

The climate varies between different parts of the island. Generally speaking, the south coast is warmer, wetter, and windier than the north. The Central Highlands are the coldest part of the country. Low-lying inland areas in the north are the aridest. Snowfall in winter is more common in the north than in the south.The highest air temperature recorded was 30.5 °C (86.9 °F) on 22 June 1939 at Teigarhorn on the southeastern coast. The lowest was −38 °C (−36.4 °F) on 21 January 1918 at Grímsstaðir and Möðrudalur in the northeastern hinterland. The temperature records for Reykjavík are 25.7 °C (78.3 °F) on 31 July 2008, and −24.5 °C (−12.1 °F) on 21 January 1918.

Due to climate change, Iceland is experiencing faster glacial retreat, changing vegetation patterns, and shifting marine ecosystems. Iceland's retreating glaciers have global and local consequences. Melting of Iceland's glaciers could raise sea levels by one centimeter (0.39 in), which could lead to erosion and flooding worldwide. In late 2025, Iceland elevated the potential collapse of the Atlantic Meridional Overturning Circulation (AMOC) to a national security risk, recognising severe climate impacts like extreme European winters, food/energy insecurity, and economic disruption as major threats.

=== Wildlife ===
The entire country is in a single ecoregion, the Iceland boreal birch forests and alpine tundra. Some areas are covered by glaciers.

==== Plants ====
Phytogeographically, Iceland belongs to the Arctic province of the Circumboreal Region within the Boreal Kingdom. Vegetation is dominated by grasslands, which are regularly grazed by livestock. The most common native tree is the northern birch (Betula pubescens), which historically formed extensive forests across Iceland, along with aspens (Populus tremula), rowans (Sorbus aucuparia), the only native gymnosperm, common juniper (Juniperus communis), and other smaller trees, mainly willows (Salix spp.).

When the island was first settled, it was extensively forested, with around 30% of the land covered in trees. In the late 12th century, Ari the Wise described it in the Íslendingabók as "forested from mountain to sea shore". Permanent human settlement greatly disturbed the isolated ecosystem of thin, volcanic soils and limited species diversity. The forests were heavily exploited over the centuries for firewood and timber. Deforestation, climatic deterioration during the Little Ice Age, and overgrazing by sheep imported by settlers caused a loss of critical topsoil due to erosion. Today, many farms have been abandoned. Three-quarters of Iceland's 100,000 square kilometres (39,000 mi^{2}) is affected by soil erosion; 18,000 km^{2} (6,900 sq mi) is affected to a degree serious enough to make the land useless. Only a few small birch stands now exist in isolated reserves. The Icelandic Forest Service and other forestry groups promote large-scale reforestation in the country. Due to the reforestation efforts, the forest cover of Iceland has increased sixfold since the 1990s. That helps to offset carbon emissions, prevent sandstorms, and increase the productivity of farms. The planting of new forests has increased the number of trees, but the result does not compare to the original forests. Some of the planted forests include introduced species. The tallest tree in Iceland is a sitka spruce planted in 1949 in Kirkjubæjarklaustur; it was measured at 25.2 m (83 ft) in 2013. Algae including Chondrus crispus, Phyllphora truncata, Phyllophora crispa, and others have been recorded from Iceland.

==== Animals ====
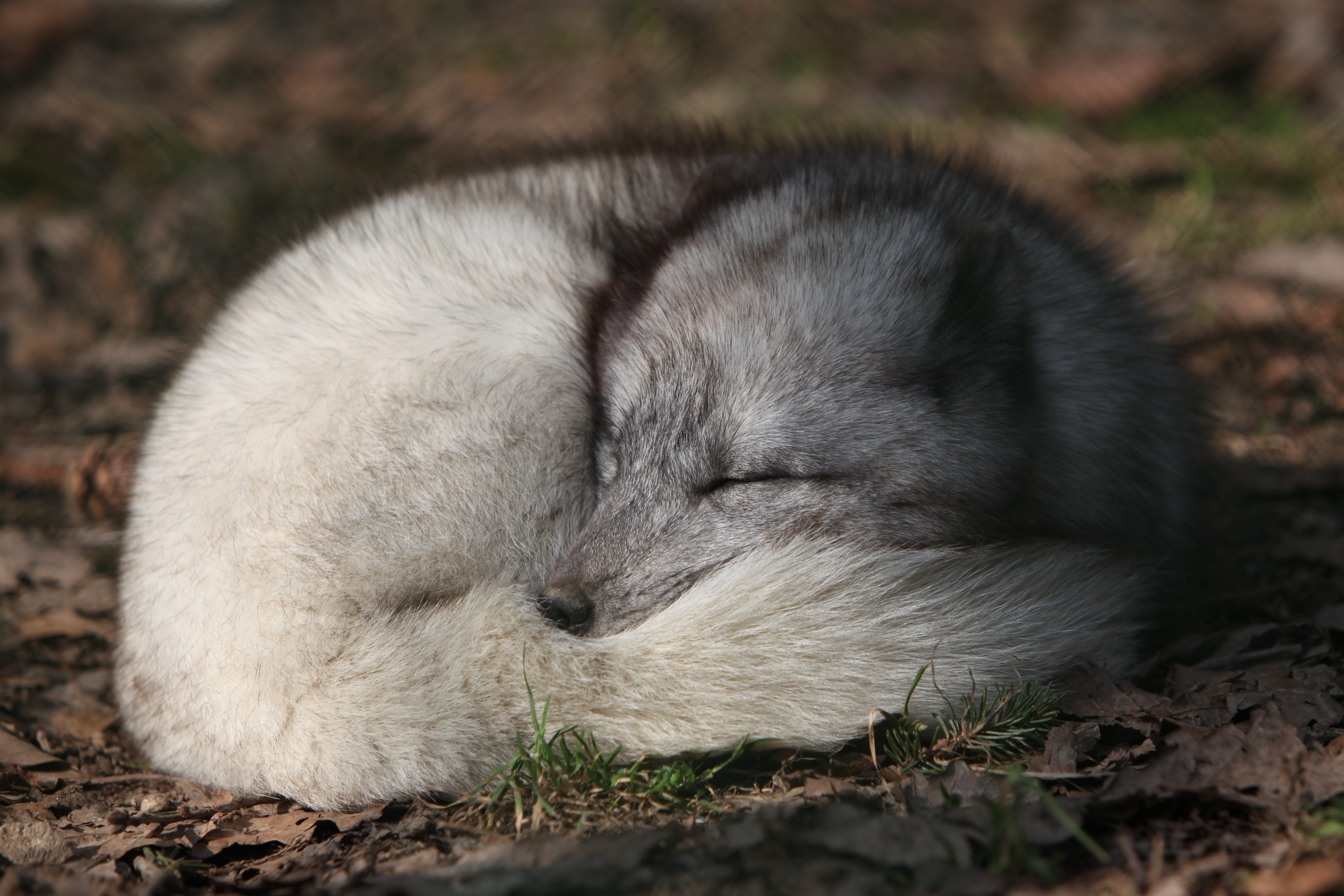
The Arctic fox was the only land mammal in Iceland before the arrival of humans.

The only native land mammal when humans arrived was the Arctic fox, which came to the island at the end of the last ice age, walking over the frozen sea. On rare occasions, bats have been carried to the island with the winds, but they are unable to breed there. No native or free-living reptiles or amphibians are on the island.

The animals of Iceland include the Icelandic sheep, cattle, chickens, goats, the sturdy Icelandic horse, and the Icelandic Sheepdog, all descendants of animals imported by Europeans. Wild mammals include the Arctic fox, mink, mice, rats, rabbits, and reindeer. Polar bears occasionally visit the island, travelling from Greenland on icebergs, but no Icelandic populations exist. In June 2008, two polar bears arrived in the same month. Marine mammals include the grey seal (Halichoerus grypus) and harbour seal (Phoca vitulina). Many species of fish live in the ocean waters surrounding Iceland, and the fishing industry is a major part of Iceland's economy, accounting for roughly half of the country's total exports. Birds, especially seabirds, are an important part of Iceland's animal life. Atlantic puffins, skuas, and black-legged kittiwakes nest on its sea cliffs.

Commercial whaling is practised intermittently along with scientific whale hunts. Whale watching has become an important part of Iceland's economy since 1997.

Around 1,300 species of insects are known in Iceland. This is low compared with other countries (over one million species have been described worldwide). Iceland was essentially free of mosquitoes until October 2025.

== Politics ==
Iceland is a parliamentary representative democratic republic, whereby the president is the head of state, while the prime minister serves as the head of government in a multi-party system. Members of the Icelandic parliament are voted in by proportional representation within large constituencies.

After the 2024 parliamentary elections, the Icelandic government is led by a coalition between the Social Democratic Alliance, the centrist Viðreisn (Liberal Reform Party), and the populist People's Party. The governing coalition's cabinet is led by prime minister Kristrún Frostadóttir of the Social Democrats. Other political parties with seats in the Althing (Parliament) are the centre-right Independence Party, the right-wing Centre Party, and the agrarian Progressive Party.

According to International IDEA's Global State of Democracy (GSoD) Indices and Democracy Tracker, Iceland performs in the high range on overall democratic measures, with particular weaknesses in inclusive suffrage. In 2024, Iceland was ranked fourth in the strength of its democratic institutions and 10th in government transparency. The country has a high level of civic participation, with 81.4% voter turnout during the most recent elections, compared to an OECD average of 72%. Iceland scored second in Europe for their trust in legal institutions (police, parliament, and judiciary) at a mean of 73% trust as of 2018. Many political parties remain opposed to EU membership, primarily due to Icelanders' concern about losing control over their natural resources (particularly fisheries).

=== Women's rights ===
Women in Iceland first gained the right to vote in 1915 (with restrictions) and increased voting rights in 1920. Iceland was the first country in the world to have a political party formed and led entirely by women. Known as the Women's List (Kvennalistinn), it was founded in 1983 to advance the political, economic, and social needs of women. It left a lasting influence on Iceland's politics: every major party has a 40% quota for women. After the 2021 elections, 48% of members of parliament were female compared to the global average of 16% in 2009. Vigdís Finnbogadóttir was the world's first democratically elected female head of state. In 2009, Jóhanna Sigurðardóttir became the world's first openly LGBT head of government.

=== Government ===
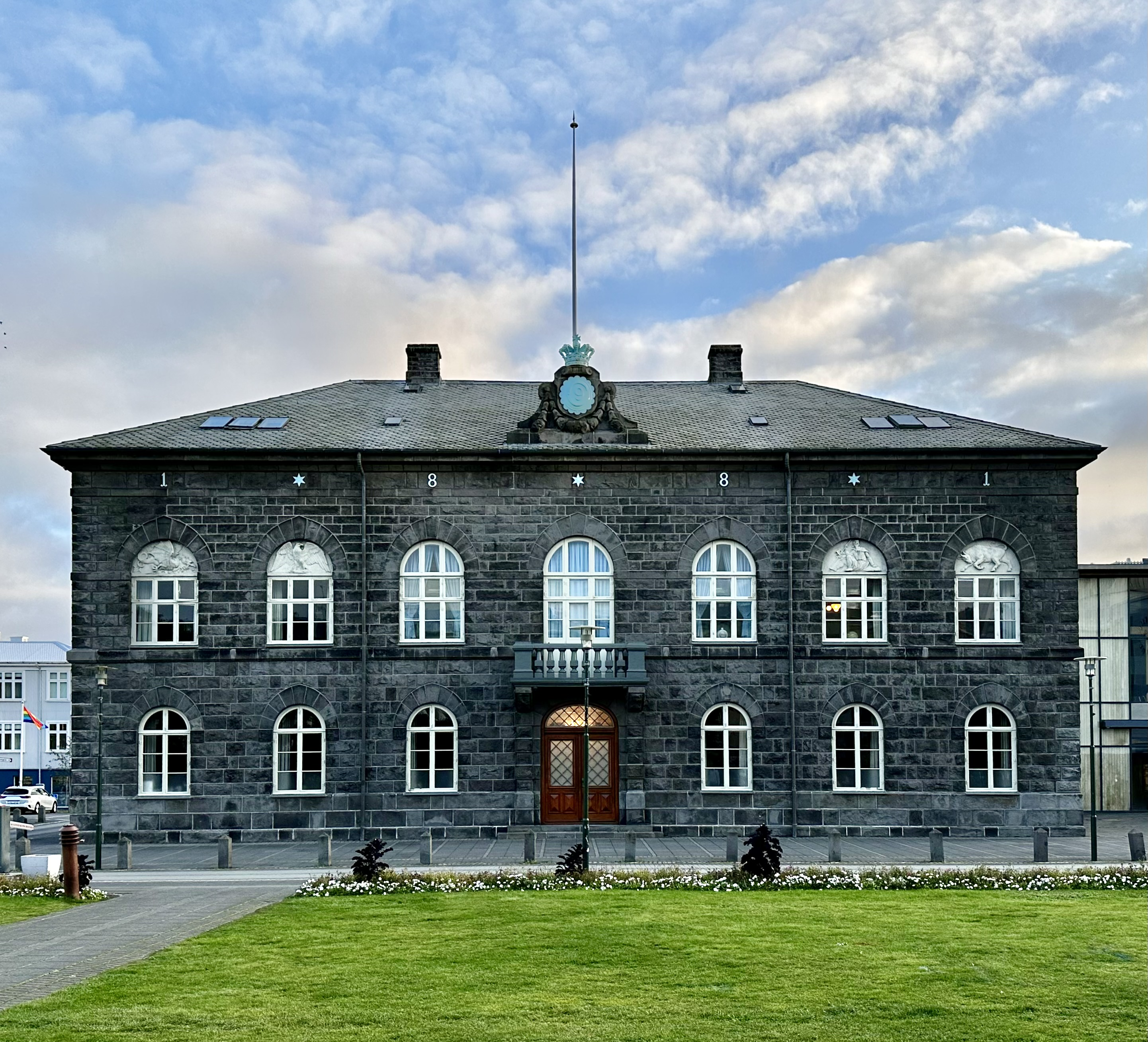
Alþingishúsið houses the Althing (Parliament of Iceland) in Reykjavík.

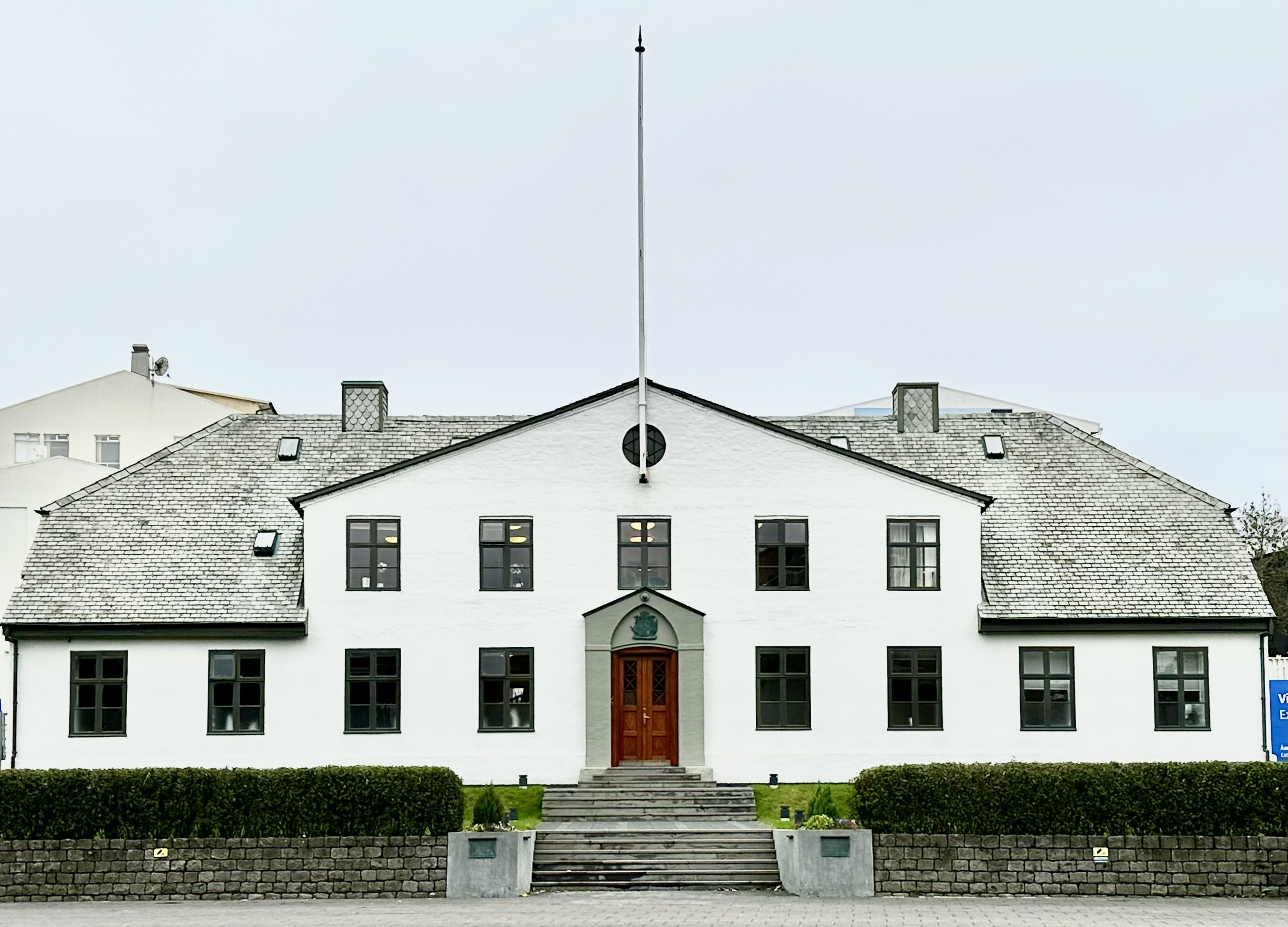
Stjórnarráðshúsið houses the Cabinet of Iceland and the Prime Minister's Office in Reykjavík.

Iceland is a representative democracy and a parliamentary republic. The modern parliament, Alþingi (English: Althing), was founded in 1845 as an advisory body to the Danish monarch. It was widely seen as a re-establishment of the assembly founded in 930 in the Commonwealth period and temporarily suspended from 1799 to 1845. Consequently, "it is arguably the world's oldest parliamentary democracy." It has 63 members, elected for a maximum period of four years. The head of government is the prime minister, who with the cabinet, is responsible for executive government.

The president of Iceland, in contrast, is a largely ceremonial head of state and serves as a diplomat, but may veto laws voted by the parliament and put them to a national referendum. They are elected by popular vote for a term of four years with no term limit. The current president is Halla Tómasdóttir, having been in office since 1 August 2024. The elections for the president, the Althing, and local municipal councils are all held separately every four years.

The cabinet in the country's government is typically appointed by the president after a general election to the Althing. However, the appointment is usually negotiated by the leaders of the political parties, who decide amongst themselves which parties can form the cabinet and how to distribute its seats, as long as it has majority support in the Althing. If the party leaders are unable to come to an agreement within a reasonable period of time, the president will personally appoint the cabinet. That has not happened since the republic was founded in 1944, although in 1942 the regent, Sveinn Björnsson, appointed a non-parliamentary government. Sveinn held the practical position of president at the time and later became the country's first official president in 1944.

The governments of Iceland have always been coalition governments, with two or more parties involved, as no single political party has ever received a majority of seats in the Althing throughout the republican period. There is no legal consensus on the extent of the political power possessed by the office of the president; several provisions of the constitution appear to give the president some important powers, but other provisions and traditions suggest otherwise. In 1980, Icelanders elected Vigdís Finnbogadóttir as president, the world's first directly elected female head of state. She retired from office in 1996. In 2009, Iceland became the first country with an openly gay head of government when Jóhanna Sigurðardóttir became prime minister.

=== Administrative divisions ===
Reykjavík from above, where nearly two-thirds of Icelanders live

Iceland is divided into regions, constituencies, and municipalities. The eight regions are primarily used for statistical purposes. District court jurisdictions also use an older version of this division. Until 2003, the constituencies for the parliamentary elections were the same as the regions, but by an amendment to the constitution, they were changed to the current six constituencies:

- Reykjavík North and Reykjavík South (city regions)
- Southwest (four non-contiguous suburban areas around Reykjavík)
- Northwest and Northeast (northern half of Iceland, split)
- South (southern half of Iceland, excluding Reykjavík and suburbs)

The redistricting change was made to balance the weight of different districts of the country, since previously a vote cast in the sparsely populated areas around the country would count much more than a vote cast in the Reykjavík city area. The imbalance between districts has been reduced by the new system, but it still exists.

Sixty-two municipalities in Iceland govern local matters like schools, transport, and zoning. These are the actual second-level subdivisions of Iceland, as the constituencies have no relevance except in elections and for statistical purposes. Reykjavík is by far the most populous municipality, about four times more populous than Kópavogur, the second largest, which is itself a suburb of Reykjavík.

Regions of Iceland

Constituencies of Iceland

Municipalities of Iceland

(The white areas on the maps show (uninhabited) glaciers.)

=== Foreign relations ===
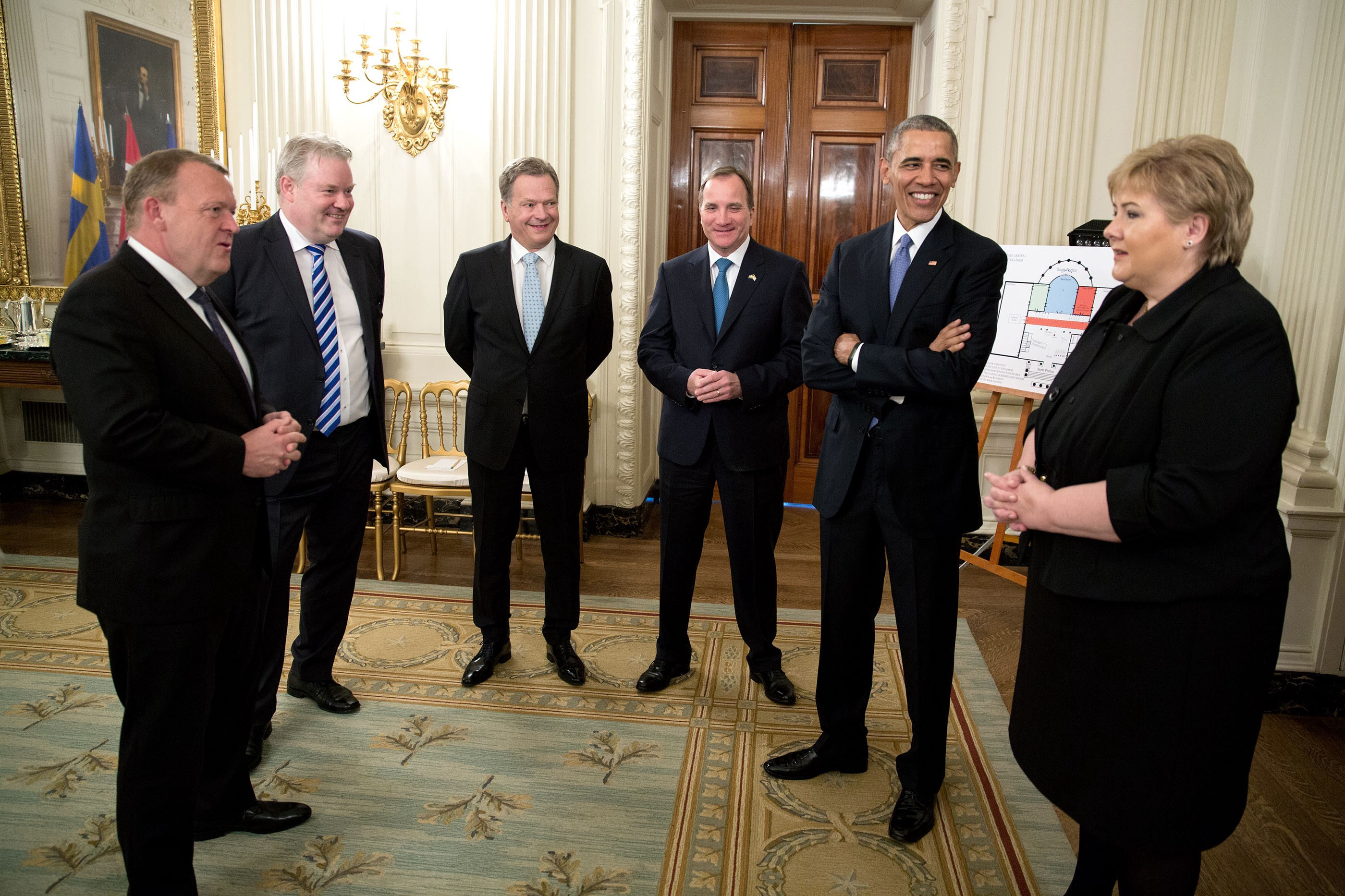
Nordic prime ministers and the president of Finland visiting the White House in 2016, with Iceland's Sigurður second from the left

Iceland, which is a member of the UN, NATO, EFTA, Council of Europe, and OECD, maintains diplomatic and commercial relations with practically all nations, but its ties with the Nordic countries, Germany, the United States, Canada, and the other NATO nations are particularly close. Historically, due to cultural, economic, and linguistic similarities, Iceland is a Nordic country, and it participates in intergovernmental cooperation through the Nordic Council.

Iceland is a member of the European Economic Area (EEA), which allows the country access to the single market of the European Union (EU). It has never been a member state of the EU, but in July 2009, the Icelandic parliament, the Althing, voted in favour of applying for EU membership and Iceland officially applied on 17 July 2009. However, in 2013, opinion polls showed that many Icelanders were now against joining the EU; after the 2013 Icelandic parliamentary election the two parties which formed the island's new government—the centrist Progressive Party and the right-wing Independence Party—announced that they would hold a referendum on EU membership. In 2015, Minister for Foreign Affairs Gunnar Bragi Sveinsson informed the EU that Iceland would no longer pursue membership, but the application was not formally withdrawn and there have been subsequent calls for a referendum on the issue. A referendum on the resumption of European Union membership negotiations was held on 29 August 2026, with the No campaign winning with 52.8% of the vote, rejecting the restart of negotiations.

=== Military ===
Iceland has no standing army but has the Icelandic Coast Guard, which also maintains the Iceland Air Defence System and an Iceland Crisis Response Unit to support peacekeeping missions and perform paramilitary functions.

The Iceland Defense Force (IDF) was a military command of the United States Armed Forces from 1951 to 2006. The IDF, created at the request of NATO, came into existence when the United States signed an agreement to provide for the defence of Iceland. The IDF also included civilian Icelanders and military members of other NATO nations. The IDF was downsized after the end of the Cold War, and the United States Air Force maintained four to six interceptor aircraft at the Naval Air Station Keflavik until they were withdrawn on 30 September 2006. Since May 2008, NATO nations have periodically deployed fighters to patrol Icelandic airspace under the Icelandic Air Policing mission. Iceland supported the 2003 invasion of Iraq despite much domestic controversy, deploying a Coast Guard EOD team to Iraq, which was replaced later by members of the Iceland Crisis Response Unit. Iceland has also participated in the conflict in Afghanistan and the 1999 NATO bombing of Yugoslavia. Despite the ongoing financial crisis the first new patrol ship in decades was launched on 29 April 2009.

Iceland was the neutral host of the historic 1986 Reagan–Gorbachev summit in Reykjavík, which set the stage for the end of the Cold War. Iceland's principal historical international disputes involved disagreements over exclusive economic zones. Conflict with the United Kingdom led to a series of so-called Cod Wars, which included confrontations between the Icelandic Coast Guard and the Royal Navy regarding British fishermen: in 1952–1956 due to the extension of Iceland's fishing zone from 3 to 4 nmi (5.6 to 7.4 km; 3.5 to 4.6 mi), in 1958–1961 following a further extension to 12 nmi (22.2 km; 13.8 mi), in 1972–1973 with another extension to 50 nmi (92.6 km; 57.5 mi), and in 1975–1976 after another extension to 200 nmi (370.4 km; 230.2 mi).

According to the 2024 Global Peace Index, Iceland is the most peaceful country in the world, due to its lack of armed forces, low crime rate, and high level of socio-political stability. Iceland is listed in Guinness World Records as the "country ranked most at peace" and the "lowest military spending per capita".

== Economy ==
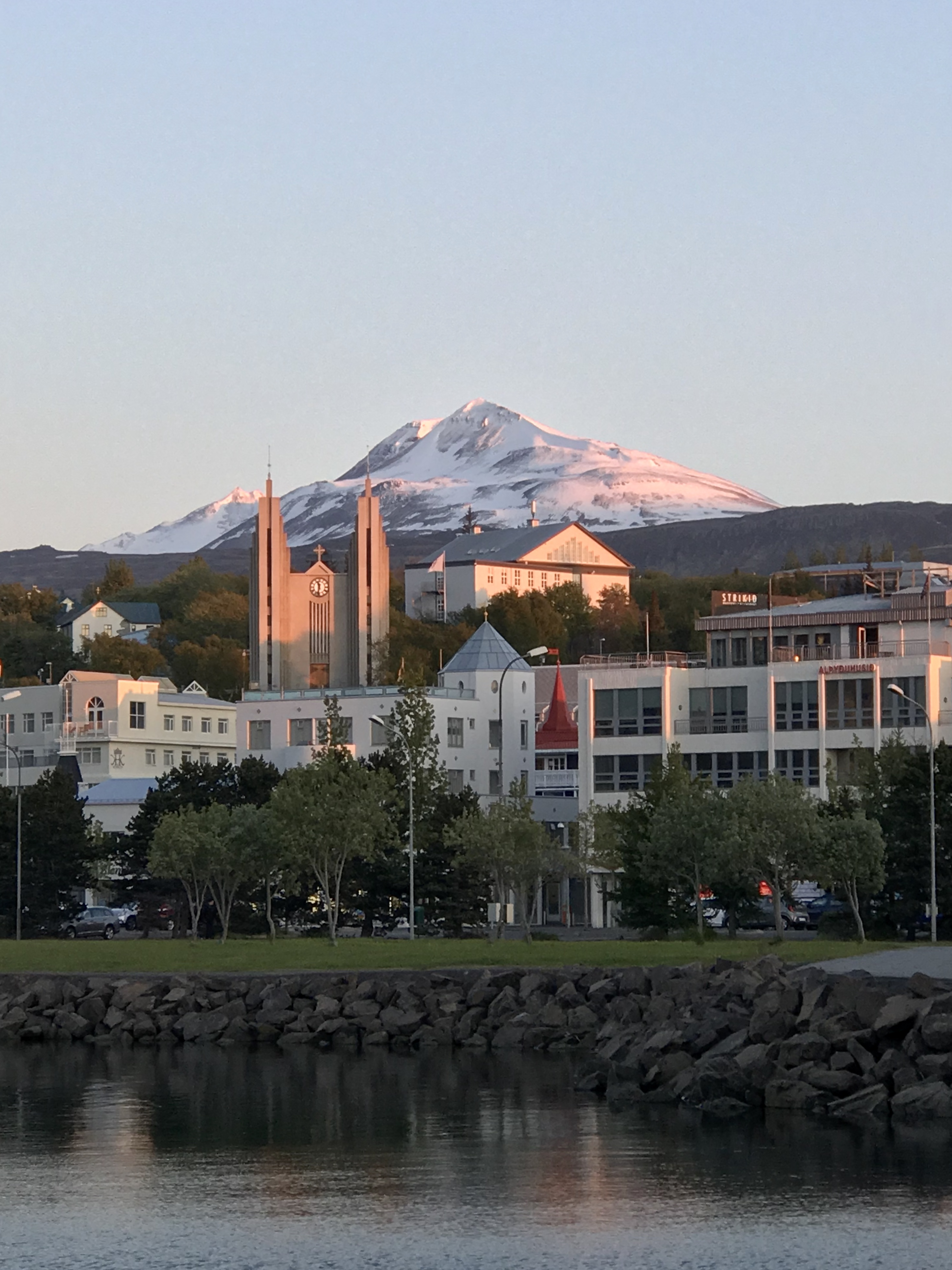
Akureyri is the largest town in Iceland outside the Capital Region. Most rural towns are based on the fishing industry, which provides 40% of Iceland's exports.

In 2022, Iceland was the eighth-most productive country in the world per capita (US$78,837), and the thirteenth-most productive by GDP at purchasing power parity ($69,833). About 85% of the total primary energy supply in Iceland is derived from domestic renewable energy sources. Use of abundant hydroelectric and geothermal power has made Iceland the world's largest electricity producer per capita.

Historically, Iceland's economy depended heavily on fishing, which still provides around 20% of export earnings and employs 7% of the workforce. The economy is now more dependent on tourism, but important sectors continue to be fish and fish products, aluminium, and ferrosilicon. Iceland's economic dependence on fishing is diminishing, from an export share of 90% in the 1960s to 20% in 2020.

Until the 20th century, Iceland was a fairly poor country. Whaling in Iceland was historically significant. It is now one of the most developed countries in the world. Strong economic growth led Iceland to be ranked third in the United Nations' Human Development Index report for 2021/2022. According to the Economist Intelligence Index of 2011, Iceland had the second-highest quality of life in the world. Based on the Gini coefficient, Iceland also has one of the lowest rates of income inequality in the world, and when adjusted for inequality, its HDI ranking is sixth. Iceland's unemployment rate has declined consistently since the crisis, with 4.8% of the labour force being unemployed as of June 2012, compared to 6% in 2011 and 8.1% in 2010.

The national currency of Iceland is the Icelandic króna (ISK). Iceland is the only country in the world with a population under two million to have a floating exchange rate and an independent monetary policy. A poll released on 5 March 2010 by Capacent Gallup showed that 31% of respondents were in favour of adopting the euro and 69% opposed. Another Capacent Gallup poll conducted in February 2012 discovered that 67.4% of Icelanders would reject EU membership in a referendum.

Iceland's economy has been diversifying into manufacturing and service industries in the last decade, including software production, biotechnology, and finance; industry accounts for around a quarter of economic activity, while services comprise close to 70%. The tourism sector is expanding, especially in ecotourism and whale-watching. On average, Iceland receives around 1.1 million visitors annually, which is more than three times the native population. 1.7 million people visited Iceland in 2016, 3 times more than the number that came in 2010. Iceland's agriculture industry, accounting for 5.4% of GDP, consists mainly of potatoes, green vegetables (in greenhouses), mutton, and dairy products. The financial centre is Borgartún in Reykjavík, which hosts a large number of companies and three investment banks. Iceland's stock market, the Iceland Stock Exchange (ISE), was established in 1985. As of 2019, Iceland ranks 26th in the World Economic Forum's Global Competitive Index, two places lower than in 2018. According to the Global Innovation Index, Iceland is the 22nd most innovative country in the world in 2024.

Despite low tax rates, agricultural assistance is the highest among OECD countries and a potential impediment to structural change. Also, health care and education spending have relatively poor returns by OECD measures, though improvements have been made in both areas. The OECD's Economic Survey of Iceland 2008 highlighted Iceland's challenges in currency and macroeconomic policy. There was a currency crisis that started in the spring of 2008, and on 6 October trading in Iceland's banks was suspended as the government battled to save the economy. Assessment by the OECD determined that Iceland has made progress in many areas, particularly in creating a sustainable fiscal policy and restoring the health of the financial sector; however, challenges remain in making the fishing industry more efficient and sustainable, as well as address inflation caused by housing. Iceland's public debt has decreased since the economic crisis, and as of 2015 is the 31st-highest in the world by proportion of national GDP.

=== Economic contraction ===
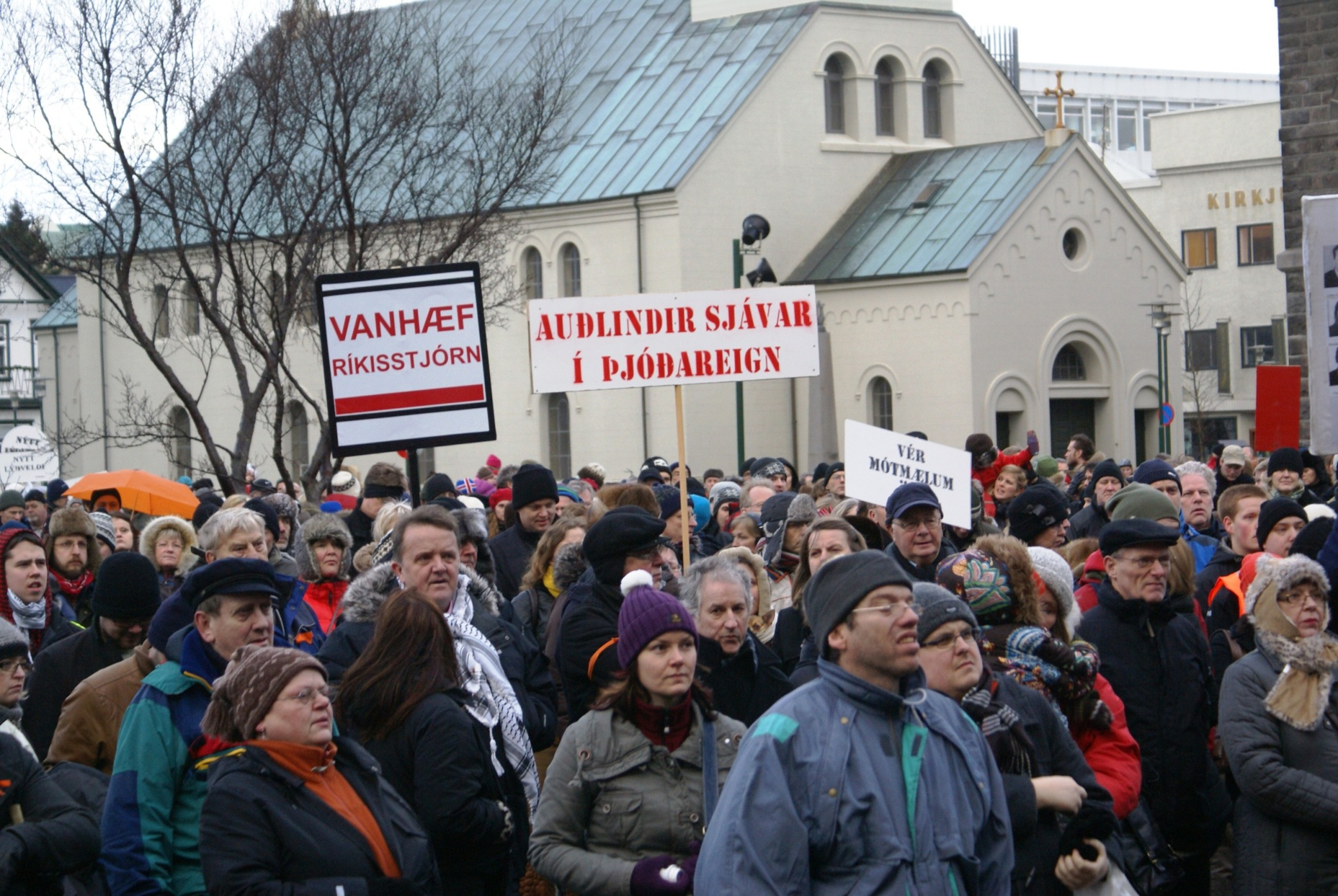
2009 Icelandic financial crisis protests

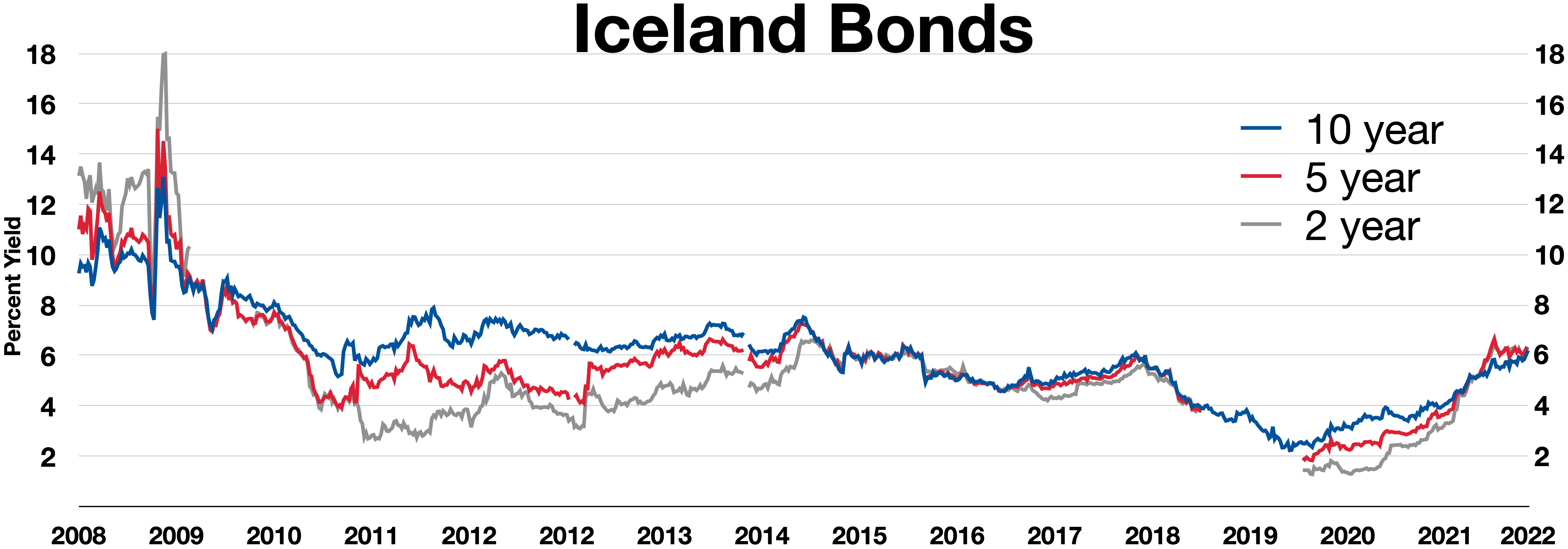
Iceland bonds had an inverted yield curve in 2008: 10 year bonds 5 year bonds 2 year bonds

Iceland was hit especially hard by the Great Recession that began in December 2007 because of the failure of its banking system and a subsequent economic crisis. Before the crash of the country's three largest banks, Glitnir, Landsbanki, and Kaupthing, their combined debt exceeded approximately six times the nation's gross domestic product of €14 billion ($19 billion). In October 2008, the Icelandic parliament passed emergency legislation to minimise the impact of the financial crisis. The Financial Supervisory Authority of Iceland used the permission granted by the emergency legislation to take over the domestic operations of the three largest banks. Icelandic officials, including central bank governor Davíð Oddsson, stated that the state did not intend to take over any of the banks' foreign debts or assets. Instead, new banks were established to take on the domestic operations of the banks, and the old banks were to be run into bankruptcy.

On 28 October 2008, the Icelandic government raised interest rates to 18% (as of August 2019, it was 3.5%), a move forced in part by the terms of acquiring a loan from International Monetary Fund (IMF). After the rate hike, trading on the Icelandic króna finally resumed on the open market, with a valuation at around 250 ISK per euro, less than one-third the value of the 1:70 exchange rate during most of 2008, and a significant drop from the 1:150 exchange ratio of the week before. On 20 November 2008, the Nordic countries agreed to lend Iceland $2.5 billion.

On 26 January 2009, the coalition government collapsed due to public dissent over the handling of the financial crisis. A new left-wing government was formed a week later and immediately set about removing Central Bank governor Davíð Oddsson and his aides from the bank through changes in the law. Davíð was removed on 26 February 2009 in the wake of protests outside the Central Bank.

Thousands of Icelanders left the country after the collapse; many of them moved to Norway. In 2005, 293 people moved from Iceland to Norway; in 2009, the figure was 1,625. In April 2010, the Icelandic Parliament's Special Investigation Commission published the findings of its investigation, revealing the extent of control fraud in this crisis. By June 2012, Landsbanki had managed to repay about half of the Icesave debt. According to Bloomberg in 2014, Iceland was on the trajectory of 2% unemployment as a result of crisis-management decisions made back in 2008, including allowing the banks to fail.

During the crisis, Iceland considered adopting the Canadian dollar as its currency.

=== Transport ===
==== Road ====
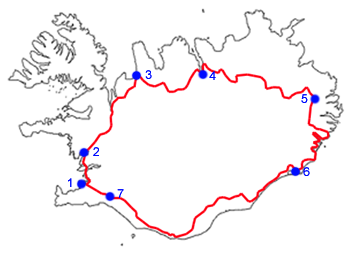
The Ring Road of Iceland and some towns it passes through: 1. Reykjavík, 2. Borgarnes, 3. Blönduós, 4. Akureyri, 5. Egilsstaðir, 6. Höfn, 7. Selfoss

Iceland has a high level of car ownership per capita, with a car for every 1.5 inhabitants; it is the main form of transport. Iceland has 13,034 km (8,099 mi) of administered roads, of which 4,617 km (2,869 mi) are paved and 8,338 km (5,181 mi) are not as of 2016. The road speed limits are 30 and 50 km/h (19 and 31 mph) in towns, 80 km/h (50 mph) on gravel country roads and 90 km/h (56 mph) on hard-surfaced roads. A great number of interior roads remain unpaved, mostly little-used rural roads. Many of Iceland's roads can be challenging to navigate during winter, particularly when covered with snow or ice. Using a 4x4 vehicle provides greater flexibility for travel and improves accessibility to remote areas.

Route 1, or the Ring Road (Icelandic: Þjóðvegur 1 or Hringvegur), completed in 1974, is the main road that runs around Iceland and connects most inhabited parts of the island. The interior of the island is mostly uninhabitable. The road is paved and is 1,332 km (828 mi) long with one lane in each direction, except between and within larger towns and cities where it has more lanes. On Route 1, there are about 30 single-lane bridges, particularly prevalent in the southeast.

==== Public transport ====
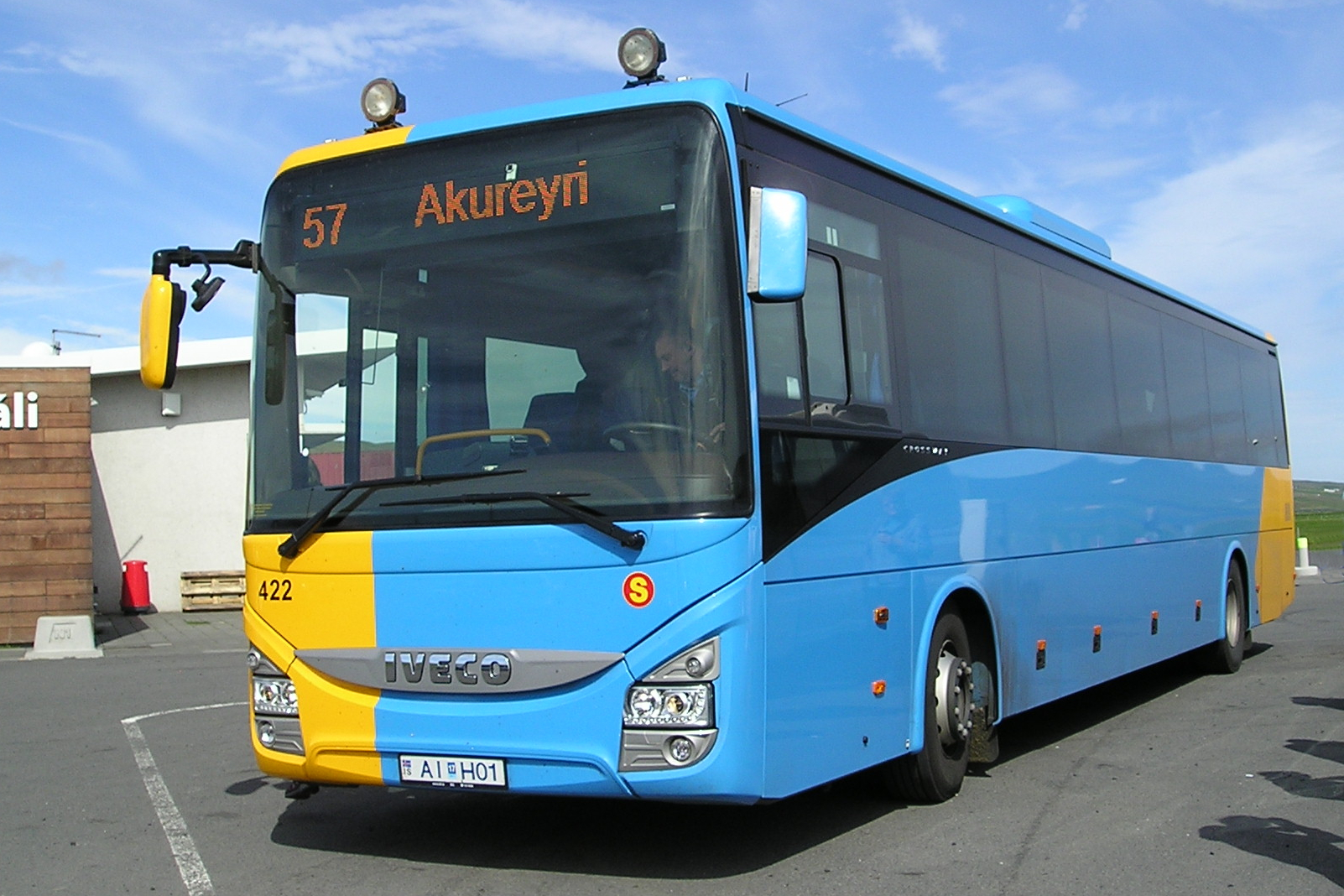
Long-distance bus operated by the public bus company Strætó

City buses in Reykjavík (including the Capital Region) are operated by Strætó bs. Long-distance public bus services throughout the country are also provided by Strætó bs. Smaller towns such as Akureyri, Reykjanesbær and Selfoss provide local bus services. Public and private bus services are available to and from Keflavik International Airport.

No passenger railways have ever operated in Iceland. Previously, temporary freight railways have operated in Iceland.

==== Air travel ====
Keflavík International Airport (KEF) is the largest airport and the main aviation hub for international passenger transport. KEF is in the southwest of the country, 49 km (30 mi) from Reykjavík City Center. Reykjavík Airport (RKV) is the second-largest airport, located just 1.5 km from the capital centre. Reykjavík Airport serves daily regular domestic flights within Iceland, general aviation, private aviation, and medivac traffic.

Akureyri Airport (AEY) and Egilsstaðir Airport (EGS) are two other airports with domestic service and limited international service. Akureyri Airport opened an expanded international terminal in 2024. There are a total of 103 registered airports and airfields in Iceland; most of them are unpaved and located in rural areas.

==== Sea ====
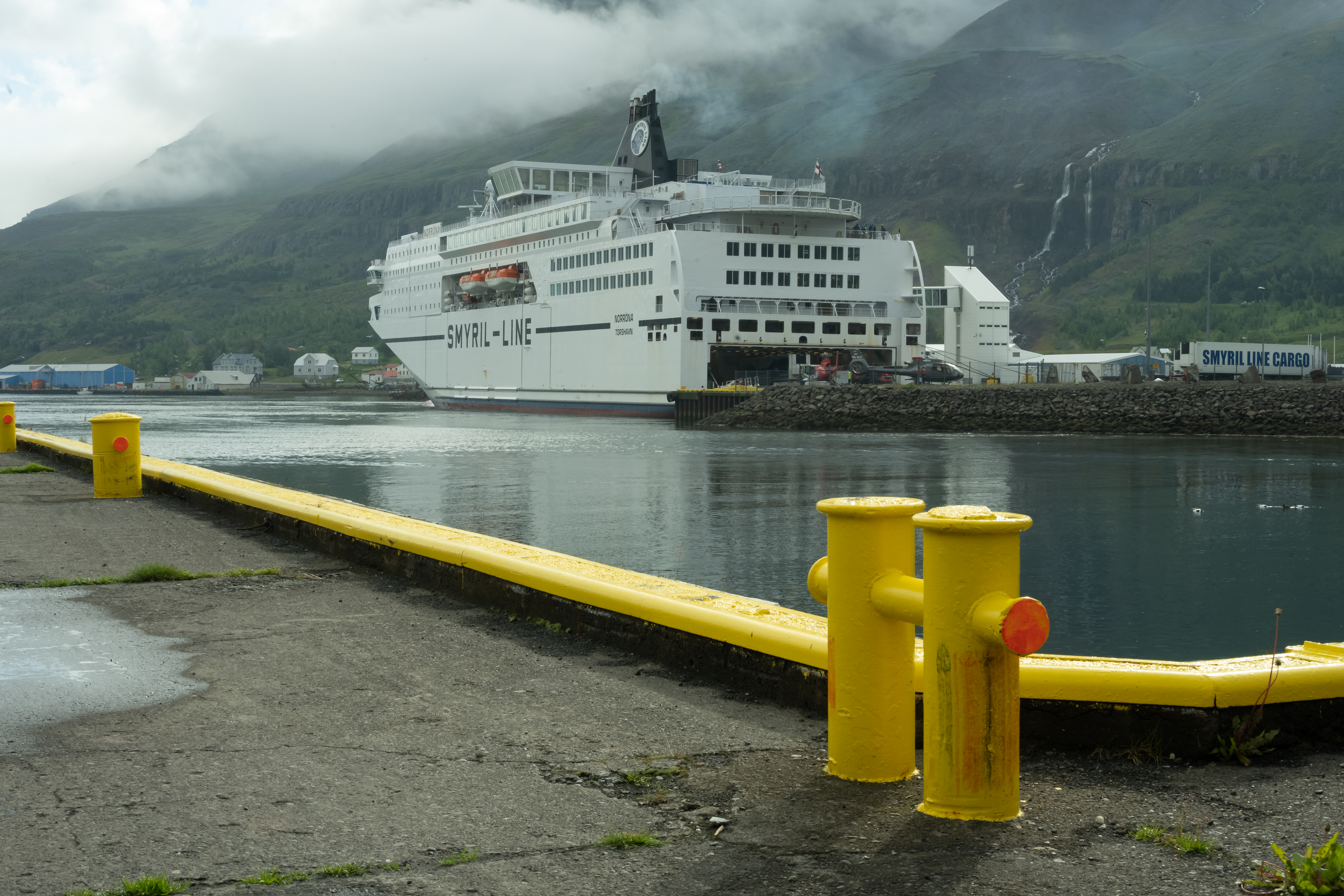
Norröna ferry in Seyðisfjorður, bound to the Faroe Islands and Denmark

Several ferry services provide regular access to various island communities and shorten travel distances. The Smyril Line operates the ship Norröna providing an international ferry service from Seyðisfjörður to the Faroe Islands and Denmark. Several companies including Eimskip and Samskip provide maritime transport services to Iceland and Iceland's largest ports are managed by Faxaflóahafnir.

=== Energy ===
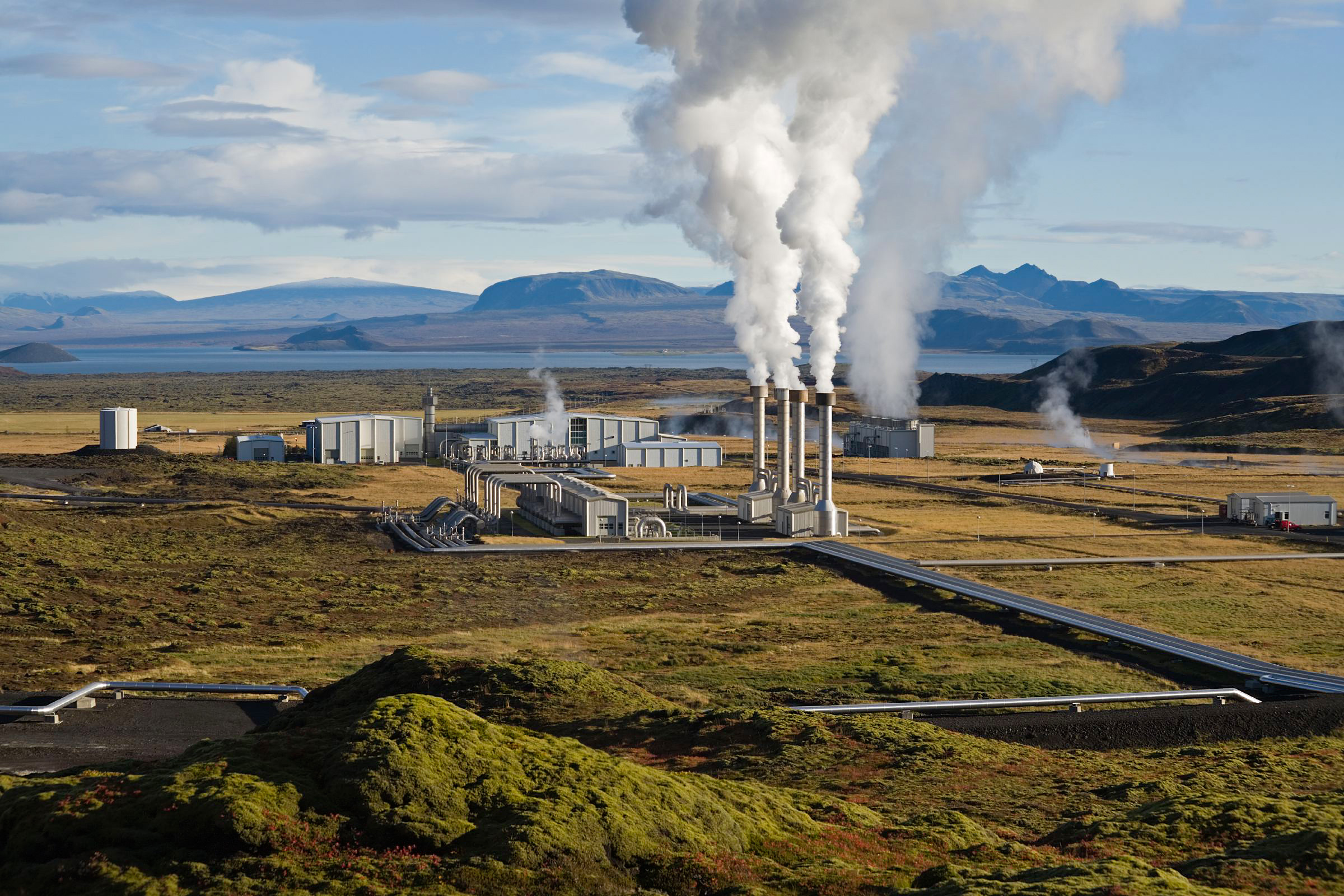
The Nesjavellir Geothermal Power Station services the Capital Region's hot water and electricity needs. Virtually all of Iceland's electricity comes from renewable resources.

Iceland electricity production by source

Renewable sources—geothermal and hydropower—provide effectively all of Iceland's electricity and around 85% of the nation's total primary energy consumption, with most of the remainder consisting of imported oil products used in transportation and in the fishing fleet. Iceland's largest geothermal power plants are Hellisheiði and Nesjavellir, while Kárahnjúkar Hydropower Plant is the country's largest hydroelectric power station. When the Kárahnjúkavirkjun began operating, Iceland became the world's largest electricity producer per capita. In 2023, battery electric vehicles constituted 50.1% of new registrations, and around 18% of the country's vehicle fleet was electrified in 2024. Iceland is one of the few countries that have filling stations dispensing hydrogen fuel for cars powered by fuel cells.

Despite that, Icelanders emitted 16.9 tonnes of CO_{2} per capita in 2016, the highest among EFTA and EU members, mainly resulting from transport and aluminium smelting. Nevertheless, in 2010, Iceland was reported by Guinness World Records as "the Greenest Country", reaching the highest score by the Environmental Sustainability Index, which measures a country's water use, biodiversity and adoption of clean energies, with a score of 93.5/100.

On 22 January 2009, Iceland announced its first round of offshore licences for companies wanting to conduct hydrocarbon exploration and production in a region northeast of Iceland, known as the Dreki area. Three exploration licences were awarded but all were later relinquished.

Iceland's official governmental goal is to cut greenhouse gas emissions by 40% by the year 2030 and reach carbon neutrality by the year 2040. As a result of its commitment to renewable energy, the 2016 Global Green Economy Index ranked Iceland among the top 10 greenest economies in the world.

=== Education and science ===
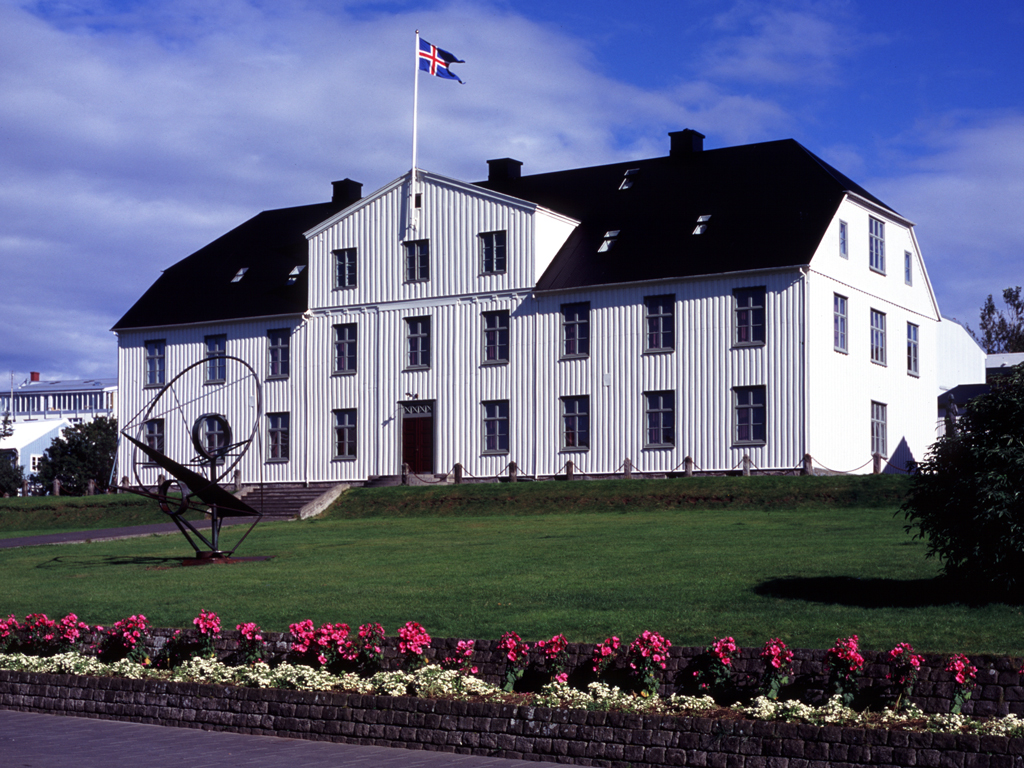
Reykjavík Junior College (Menntaskólinn í Reykjavík), in downtown Reykjavík, is the oldest gymnasium in Iceland.

The Ministry of Education, Science and Culture is responsible for the policies and methods that schools must use, and they issue the National Curriculum Guidelines. However, playschools, primary schools, and lower secondary schools are funded and administered by the municipalities. The government allows citizens to home educate their children, however, under a very strict set of demands. Students must adhere closely to the government-mandated curriculum, and the parents teaching must acquire a government-approved teaching certificate.

Nursery school, or leikskóli, is non-compulsory education for children younger than six years and is the first step in the education system. The current legislation concerning playschools was passed in 1994. They are also responsible for ensuring that the curriculum is suitable to make the transition into compulsory education as easy as possible.

Compulsory education, or grunnskóli, comprises primary and lower secondary education, which is often conducted at the same institution. Education is mandatory by law for children aged from 6 to 16 years. The school year lasts nine months, beginning between 21 August and 1 September, and ending between 31 May and 10 June. The minimum number of school days was once 170, but after a new teachers' wage contract, it increased to 180. Lessons take place five days a week. All public schools have mandatory education in Christianity, although an exemption may be considered by the Minister of Education.

Upper secondary education, or framhaldsskóli, follows lower secondary education. These schools are also known as gymnasia in Europe. Though not compulsory, everyone who has had a compulsory education has the right to upper secondary education. This stage of education is governed by the Upper Secondary School Act of 1996. All schools in Iceland are mixed-sex schools. The largest seat of higher education is the University of Iceland, which has its main campus in central Reykjavík. Other schools offering university-level instruction include Reykjavík University, University of Akureyri, Agricultural University of Iceland, and Bifröst University. An OECD assessment found that 64% of Icelanders aged 25–64 have earned the equivalent of a high-school degree, which is lower than the OECD average of 73%. Among 25- to 34-year-olds, only 69% have earned the equivalent of a high-school degree, significantly lower than the OECD average of 80%. Nevertheless, Iceland's education system is considered excellent: the Programme for International Student Assessment ranks it as the 16th best performing, above the OECD average. Students were particularly proficient in reading and mathematics.

According to a 2013 Eurostat report by the European Commission, Iceland spends around 3.11% of its GDP on scientific research and development (R&D), over 1 percentage point higher than the EU average of 2.03%, and has set a target of 4% to reach by 2020. Iceland was ranked 24th in the Global Innovation Index in 2025 A 2010 UNESCO report found that out of 72 countries that spend the most on R&D (US$100 million or more), Iceland ranked ninth by proportion of GDP, tied with Taiwan, Switzerland, and Germany and ahead of France, the United Kingdom and Canada.

== Demographics ==
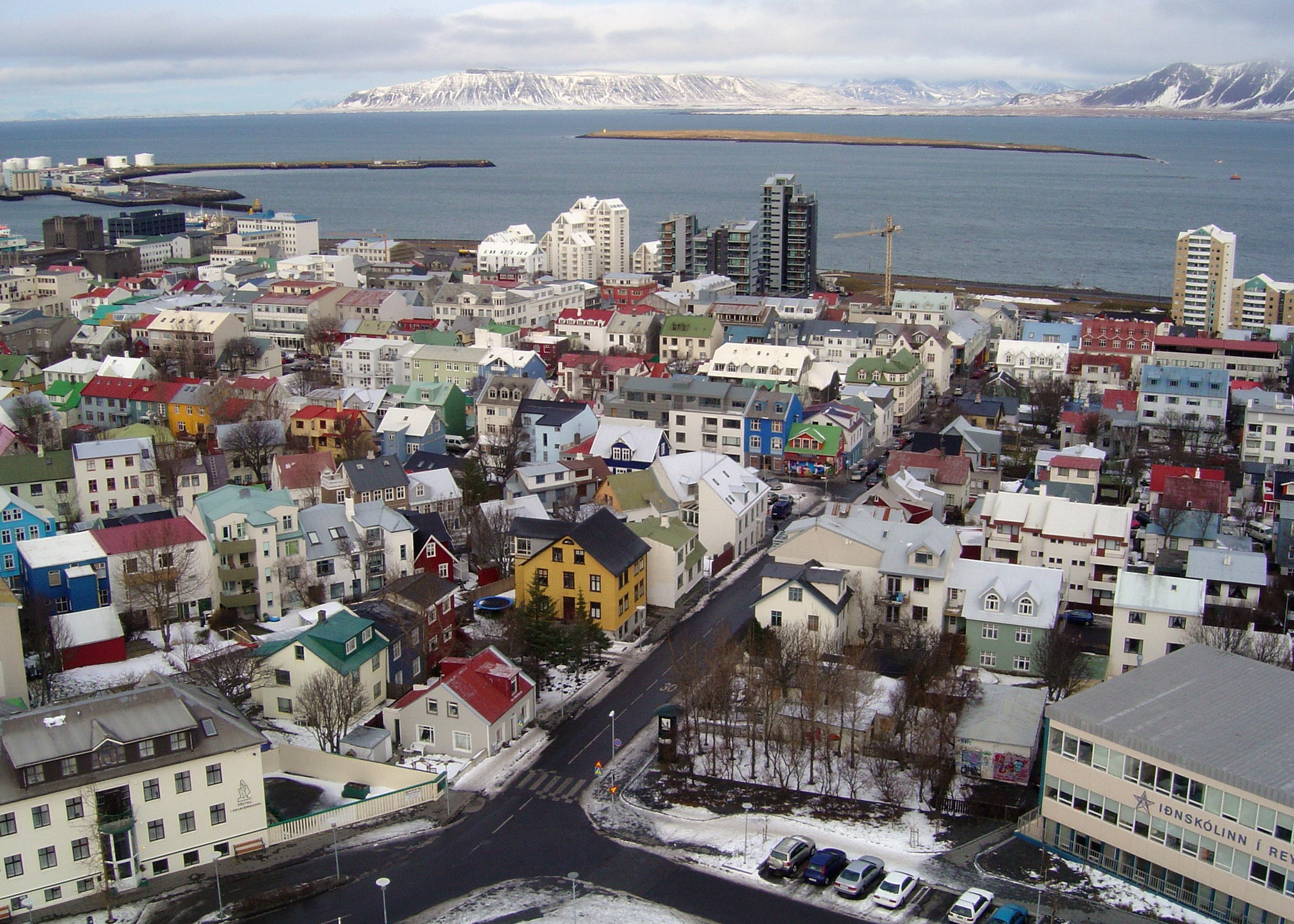
Reykjavík, Iceland's largest metropolitan area and the centre of the Capital Region which, with a population of 233,034, makes up 64% of Iceland's population (numbers from 2020)

The original population of Iceland was of Norse and Gaelic origin which is evident from literary evidence dating from the settlement period as well as from later scientific studies such as blood type and genetic analyses. One such genetic study indicated that the majority of the male settlers were of Nordic origin, while the majority of the women were of Gaelic origin, meaning many settlers of Iceland were Norsemen who brought Gaelic slaves with them.

Iceland has extensive genealogical records dating back to the late 17th century and fragmentary records extending back to the Age of Settlement. The biopharmaceutical company deCODE genetics has funded the creation of a genealogy database that is intended to cover all of Iceland's known inhabitants. It views the database, called Íslendingabók, as a valuable tool for conducting research on genetic diseases, given the relative isolation of Iceland's population.

The population of the island is believed to have varied from 40,000 to 60,000 in the period ranging from initial settlement until the mid-19th century. During that time, cold winters, ash fall from volcanic eruptions, and bubonic plagues adversely affected the population several times. There were 37 years of famine in Iceland between 1500 and 1804. The first census was carried out in 1703 and revealed that the population was then 50,358. After the destructive volcanic eruptions of the Laki volcano during 1783–1784, the population reached a low of about 40,000. Improving living conditions have triggered a rapid increase in population since the mid-19th century, from about 60,000 in 1850 to 320,000 in 2008. Iceland has a relatively young population for a developed country, with one out of five people being 14 years old or younger. With a fertility rate of 2.1, Iceland is one of only a few European countries with a birth rate sufficient for long-term population growth (see table below).

In December 2007, 33,678 people (13.5% of the total population) living in Iceland had been born abroad, including children of Icelandic parents living abroad. Around 19,000 people (6% of the population) held foreign citizenship. Polish people make up the largest minority group by a considerable margin and still form the bulk of the foreign workforce. About 8,000 Poles now live in Iceland, 1,500 of them in Fjarðabyggð, where they make up 75% of the workforce who are constructing the Fjarðarál aluminium plant. Large-scale construction projects in the east of Iceland (see Kárahnjúkar Hydropower Plant) have also brought in many people whose stay is expected to be temporary. Many Polish immigrants were also considering leaving in 2008 as a result of the Icelandic financial crisis.

The southwest corner of Iceland is by far the most densely populated region. It is also the location of the capital Reykjavík, the northernmost national capital in the world. More than 70 per cent of Iceland's population lives in the southwest corner (Greater Reykjavík and the nearby Southern Peninsula), which covers less than two per cent of Iceland's land area. The largest town outside Greater Reykjavík is Reykjanesbær, which is located on the Southern Peninsula, less than 50 km (31 mi) from the capital. The largest town outside the southwest corner is Akureyri in northern Iceland.

About 500 Icelanders under the leadership of Erik the Red settled Greenland in the late tenth century. The total population reached a high point of perhaps 5,000, and developed independent institutions before disappearing by 1500. People from Greenland attempted to set up a settlement at Vinland in North America, but abandoned it in the face of hostility from the indigenous population.

Emigration of Icelanders to the United States and Canada began in the 1870s. As of 2021, Canada had over 101,000 people of Icelandic descent, while there are more than 40,000 Americans of Icelandic descent, according to the 2000 US census.

=== Urbanisation ===
Iceland's 10 most populous urban areas:

Largest cities or towns in Iceland statice.is
Rank	Name	Region	Pop.
1	Reykjavík	Capital Region	138,722
2	Kópavogur	Capital Region	36,975
3	Hafnarfjörður	Capital Region	29,799
4	Reykjanesbær	Southern Peninsula	18,920
5	Akureyri	Northeastern Region	18,925
6	Garðabær	Capital Region	16,299
7	Mosfellsbær	Capital Region	11,463
8	Árborg	Southern Region	9,485
9	Akranes	Western Region	7,411
10	Fjarðabyggð	Eastern Region	5,070

=== Language ===
Iceland's official written and spoken language is Icelandic, a North Germanic language descended from Old Norse. In grammar and vocabulary, it has changed less from Old Norse than the other Nordic languages; Icelandic has preserved more verb and noun inflection, and has to a considerable extent developed new vocabulary based on native roots rather than borrowings from other languages. The puristic tendency in the development of Icelandic vocabulary is, to a large degree, a result of conscious language planning, in addition to centuries of isolation. Icelandic is the only living language to retain the use of the runic letter Þ in Latin script. The closest living relative of the Icelandic language is Faroese.

Icelandic Sign Language was officially recognised as a minority language in 2011. In education, its use for Iceland's deaf community is regulated by the National Curriculum Guide.

English and Danish are compulsory subjects in the school curriculum. English is widely understood and spoken, while basic to moderate knowledge of Danish is common mainly among the older generations. Polish is mostly spoken by the local Polish community (the largest minority of Iceland), and Danish is mostly spoken in a way largely comprehensible to Swedes and Norwegians—it is often referred to as skandinavíska (i.e. Scandinavian) in Iceland. Iceland was a territory ruled by Denmark–Norway, one of whose official languages was Danish; its official status was terminated in 1944.

Rather than using family names, as is the custom in most Western nations, most Icelanders carry patronymic or matronymic surnames, the usage of patronyms being far more practised. Patronymic last names are based on the first name of the father (in the genitive case), while matronymic names are based on the first name of the mother. They follow the person's given name, e.g. Elísabet Jónsdóttir ("Elísabet, Jón's daughter" (Jón being the father)) or Ólafur Katrínarson ("Ólafur, Katrín's son" (Katrín being the mother)). Consequently, Icelanders refer to one another by their given name, and the Icelandic telephone directory lists people alphabetically by the first name rather than by surname. All new names must be approved by the Icelandic Naming Committee.

=== Health ===
Life expectancy in Iceland, 1838 to 2021

Iceland has a universal health care system that is administered by its Ministry of Welfare (Icelandic: Velferðarráðuneytið) and paid for mostly by taxes (85%) and to a lesser extent by service fees (15%). Unlike most countries, there are no private hospitals, and private insurance is practically nonexistent.

A considerable portion of the government budget is assigned to health care, and Iceland ranks 11th in health care expenditures as a percentage of GDP and 14th in spending per capita. Overall, the country's health care system is one of the best-performing in the world, ranked 15th by the World Health Organization. According to an OECD report, Iceland devotes far more resources to healthcare than most industrialised nations. As of 2009, Iceland had 3.7 doctors per 1,000 people (compared with an average of 3.1 in OECD countries) and 15.3 nurses per 1,000 people (compared with an OECD average of 8.4).

Icelanders are among the world's healthiest people, with 77% reporting they are in good health, more than the OECD average of 68%. Although it is a growing problem, obesity is not as prevalent as in other developed countries. Iceland has many campaigns for health and wellbeing, including the famous television show LazyTown, starring and created by former gymnastics champion Magnus Scheving. Infant mortality is one of the lowest in the world, and the proportion of the population that smokes is lower than the OECD average. Almost all women choose to terminate pregnancies of children with Down syndrome in Iceland. The average life expectancy is 81.8 (compared to an OECD average of 79.5), the fourth-highest in the world.

Iceland has a very low level of pollution, thanks to an overwhelming reliance on cleaner geothermal energy, a low population density, and a high level of environmental consciousness among citizens. According to an OECD assessment, the amount of toxic materials in the atmosphere is far lower than in any other industrialised country measured. In 2023, the suicide rate in Iceland was 12.4 cases per 100,000. Over the last five years, from 2019 to 2023, there were an average of 41 suicides per year or 11.3 per 100,000 inhabitants. In 2022, the country's consumption of antidepressants was the highest in Europe.

=== Religion ===
Affiliation by religious movement (1 January 2026)
Affiliation	% of population
Christianity	67.24
Church of Iceland	56.3
Other Lutheran churches	5.27
Catholic Church	3.95
Eastern Orthodox Church	0.32
Other Christian denominations	1.4
Other religion or association	25.09
Humanist association	1.62
Germanic Heathenism	1.57
Islam	0.54
Buddhism	0.41
Other and not specified	20.95
Unaffiliated	7.67

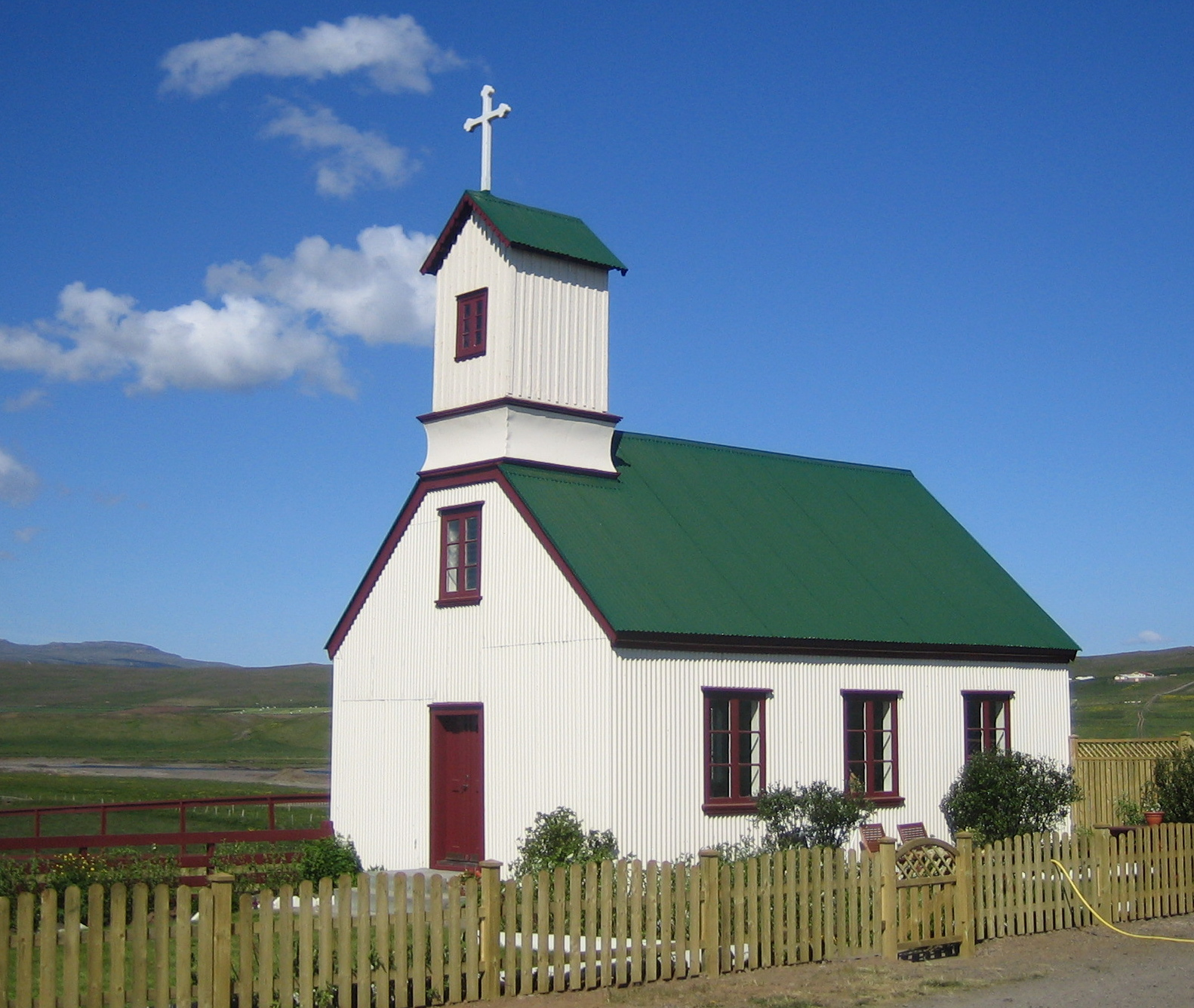
A church in the northwest of Iceland

Icelanders have freedom of religion guaranteed under the Constitution, although the Church of Iceland, a Lutheran body, is the state church:

The Evangelical Lutheran Church shall be the State Church in Iceland and, as such, it shall be supported and protected by the State.

— Article 62, Section IV of Constitution of Iceland

Approximately 70 per cent of Icelanders legally affiliate with a religious denomination, a process that happens automatically at birth and from which they can choose to opt out. They also pay a church tax (sóknargjald), which the government directs to help support their registered religion, or, in the case of no religion, the University of Iceland.

On 8 March 2021, Iceland formally recognised Judaism as a religion for the first time. Iceland's Jews will have the choice to register as such and direct their taxes to their own religion. Among other benefits, the recognition will also allow Jewish marriage, baby-naming, and funeral ceremonies to be civilly recognised.

Iceland is a very secular country; as with other Nordic nations, church attendance is relatively low. The above statistics represent administrative membership of religious organisations, which does not necessarily reflect the belief demographics of the population. According to a study published in 2001, 23% of the inhabitants were either atheist or agnostic. A Gallup poll conducted in 2012 found that 57% of Icelanders considered themselves "religious", 31% considered themselves "non-religious", while 10% defined themselves as "convinced atheists", placing Iceland among the ten countries with the highest proportion of atheists in the world.

== Culture ==
Icelandic culture has its roots in North Germanic traditions. Icelandic literature is popular, in particular the sagas and eddas that were written during the High and Late Middle Ages. Centuries of isolation have helped to insulate the country's Nordic culture from external influence; a prominent example is the preservation of the Icelandic language, which remains the closest to Old Norse of all modern Nordic languages. The country has a strong tradition of upholding human rights such as freedom of expression, freedom of religion and freedom of assembly with legislation for marginalised groups, such as women, immigrants, and the LGBTQ+ community.

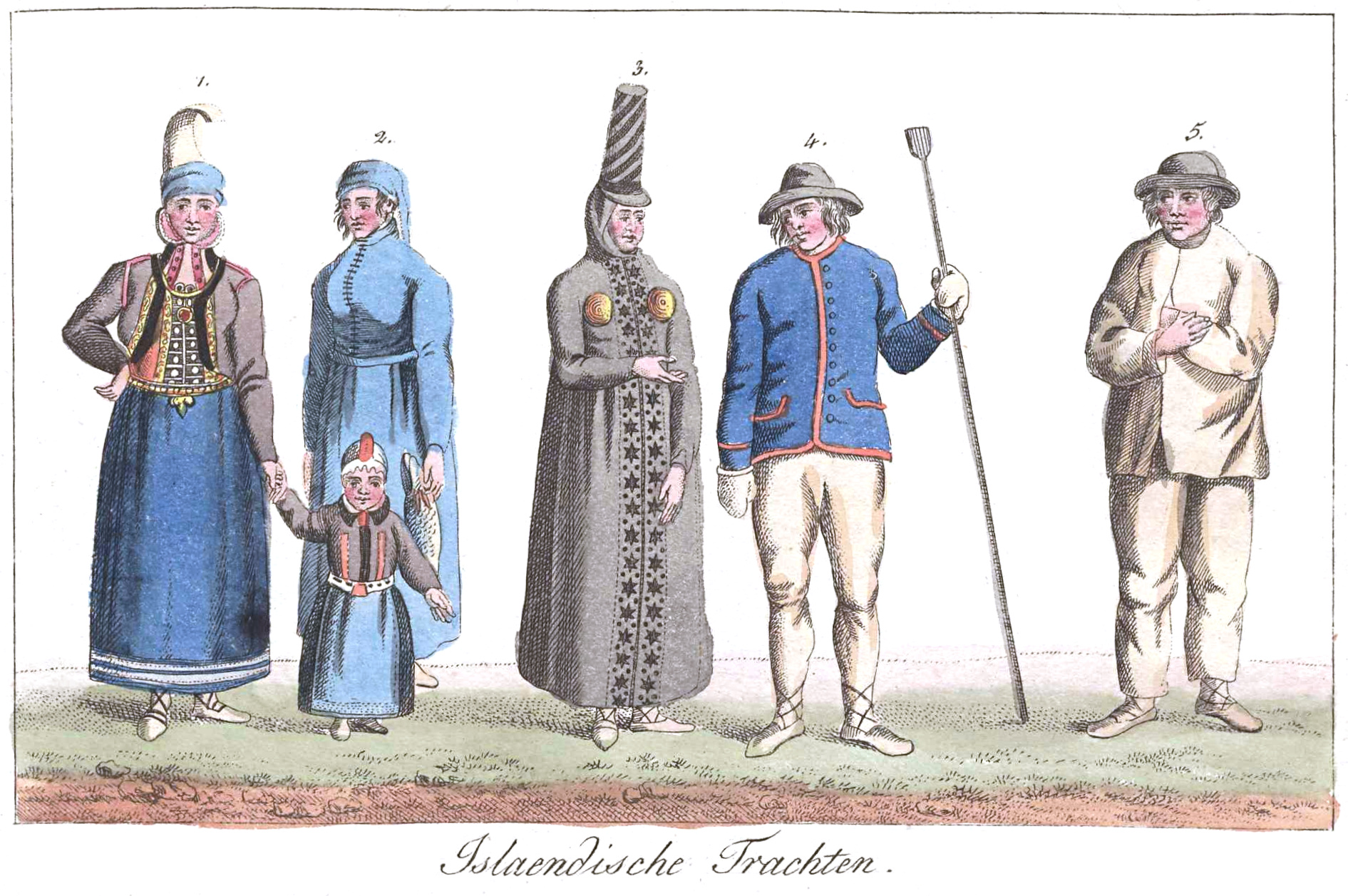
Traditional clothing of Icelanders in the early 19th century

In contrast to other Nordic countries, Icelanders place relatively great importance on independence and self-sufficiency; in a public opinion analysis conducted by the European Commission, over 85% of Icelanders believe independence is "very important", compared to 47% of Norwegians, 49% of Danes, and an average of 53% for the EU25. Icelanders also have a very strong work ethic, working some of the longest hours of any industrialised nation.

According to a poll conducted by the OECD, 66% of Icelanders were satisfied with their lives, while 70% believed that their lives would be satisfying in the future. Similarly, 83% reported having more positive experiences in an average day than negative ones, compared to an OECD average of 72%, which makes Iceland one of the happiest countries in the OECD. A more recent 2012 survey found that around three-quarters of respondents stated they were satisfied with their lives, compared to a global average of about 53%. In 2022, 2023, and 2024 consecutively, Iceland ranked third in the World Happiness Report.

Icelanders are known for their strong sense of community and lack of social isolation: An OECD survey found that 98% believe they know someone they could rely on in a time of need, higher than in any other industrialised country. Similarly, only 6% reported "rarely" or "never" socialising with others. This high level of social cohesion is attributed to the small size and homogeneity of the population, as well as to a long history of harsh survival in an isolated environment, which reinforced the importance of unity and cooperation. Egalitarianism is highly valued among the people of Iceland, with income inequality being among the lowest in the world. The constitution explicitly prohibits the enactment of noble privileges, titles, and ranks. Everyone is addressed by their first name. As in other Nordic countries, equality between the sexes is very high; Iceland is consistently ranked among the top three countries in the world for women to live in.

=== Literature ===
In 2011, Reykjavík was designated a UNESCO City of Literature.

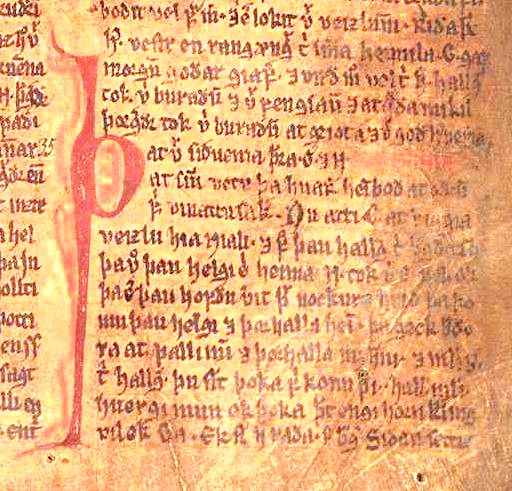
A page of Njáls saga from Möðruvallabók is shown. The sagas are a significant part of the Icelandic heritage.

Iceland's best-known classical works of literature are the Icelanders' sagas, prose epics set in Iceland's age of settlement. The most famous include Njáls saga, about an epic blood feud, and Grænlendinga saga and Eiríks saga, describing the discovery and settlement of Greenland and Vinland (modern Newfoundland). Egils saga, Laxdæla saga, Grettis saga, Gísla saga and Gunnlaugs saga ormstungu are notable and popular Icelanders' sagas.

A translation of the Bible was published in the 16th century. Important compositions from the 15th to the 19th century include sacred verse, most famously the Passion Hymns of Hallgrímur Pétursson, and rímur, rhyming epic poems. Originating in the 14th century, rímur were popular into the 19th century, when the development of new literary forms was provoked by the influential National-Romantic writer Jónas Hallgrímsson. Since then, Iceland has produced many great writers, the best-known of whom is arguably Halldór Laxness, who received the Nobel Prize in Literature in 1955 (the only Icelander to win a Nobel Prize thus far). Steinn Steinarr was an influential modernist poet during the early 20th century who remains popular.

Icelanders are avid consumers of literature, with the highest number of bookstores per capita in the world. For its size, Iceland imports and translates more international literature than any other nation. Iceland also has the highest per capita publication of books and magazines, and around 10% of the population will publish a book in their lifetimes.

Most books in Iceland are sold between late September to early November, a period known as the Christmas Book Flood (Jólabókaflóð). The Flood begins with the Iceland Publisher's Association distributing Bókatíðindi, a catalogue of all new publications, free to each Icelandic home.

=== Art ===
The distinctive rendition of the Icelandic landscape by its painters can be linked to nationalism and the movement for home rule and independence, which was very active in the mid-19th century.

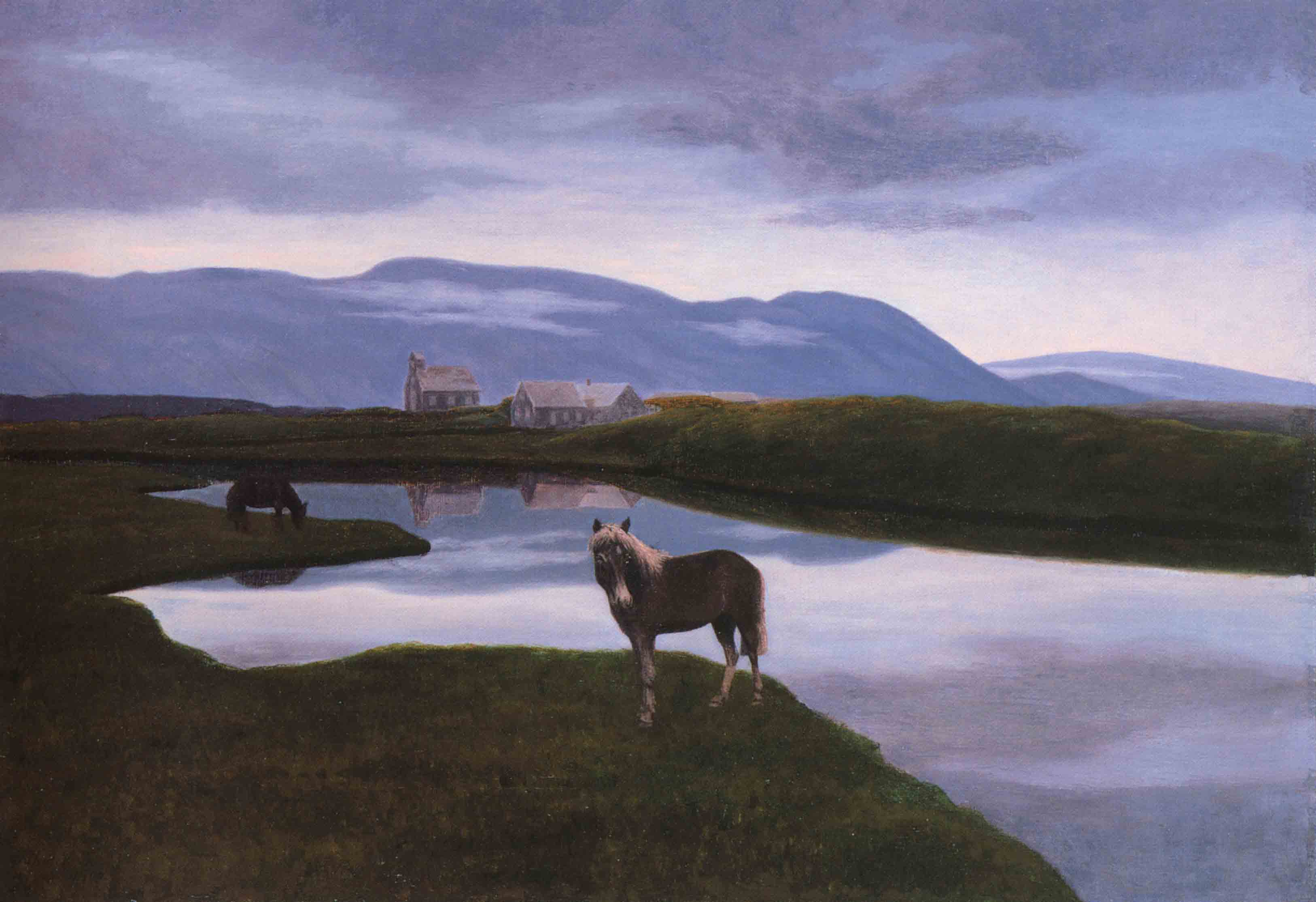
Þingvellir by Þórarinn B. Þorláksson

Contemporary Icelandic painting is typically traced to the work of Þórarinn Þorláksson, who, following formal training in art in the 1890s in Copenhagen, returned to Iceland to paint and exhibit works from 1900 to his death in 1924, almost exclusively portraying the Icelandic landscape. Several other Icelandic men and women artists studied at Royal Danish Academy of Fine Arts at that time, including Ásgrímur Jónsson, who with Þórarinn created a distinctive portrayal of Iceland's landscape in a romantic naturalistic style. Other landscape artists quickly followed in the footsteps of Þórarinn and Ásgrímur. These included Jóhannes Kjarval and Júlíana Sveinsdóttir. Kjarval, in particular, is noted for the distinct techniques in the application of paint that he developed in a concerted effort to render the characteristic volcanic rock that dominates the Icelandic environment. Einar Hákonarson is an expressionistic and figurative painter who, by some, is considered to have brought the figure back into Icelandic painting. In the 1980s, many Icelandic artists worked with the subject of the new painting in their work.

In recent years, the artistic practice has multiplied, and the Icelandic art scene has become a setting for many large-scale projects and exhibitions. The artist-run gallery space Kling og Bang, members of which later ran the studio complex and exhibition venue Klink og Bank, has been a significant part of the trend of self-organised spaces, exhibitions, and projects. The Living Art Museum, Reykjavík Municipal Art Museum, Reykjavík Art Museum, and the National Gallery of Iceland are the larger, more established institutions, curating shows and festivals.

=== Music ===
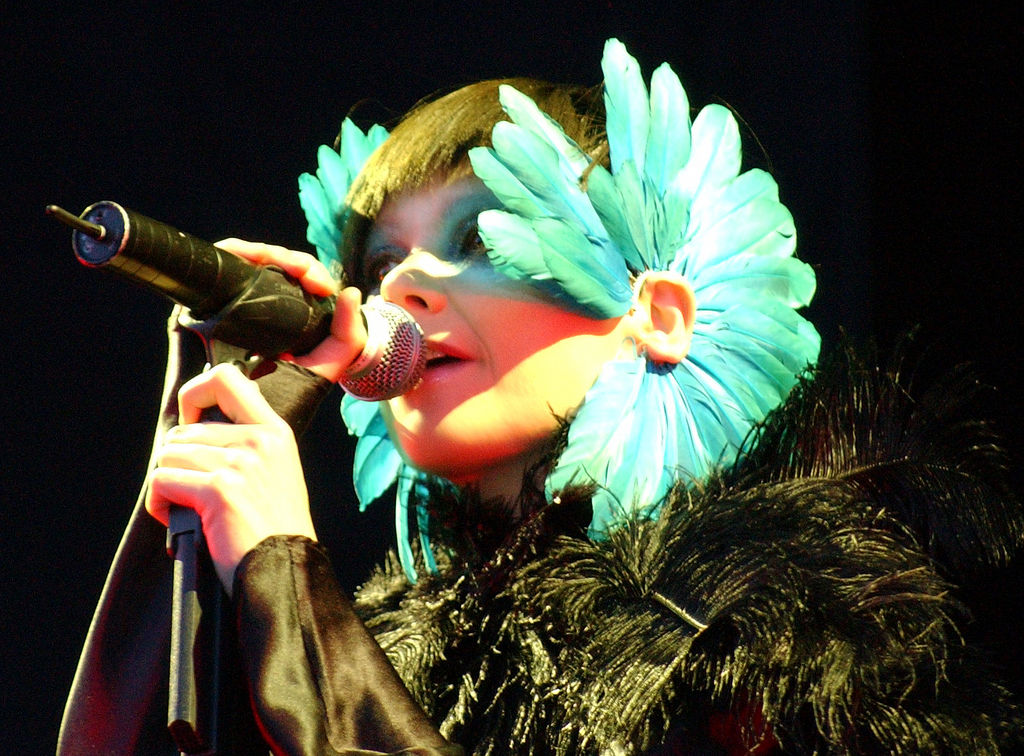
Björk is the best-known Icelandic musician.

Much Icelandic music is related to Nordic music, and includes folk and pop traditions. Notable Icelandic music acts include medieval music group Voces Thules, alternative and indie rock acts such as The Sugarcubes, Sóley and Of Monsters and Men, jazz fusion band Mezzoforte, pop singers such as Hafdís Huld, Emilíana Torrini, Laufey and Björk, solo ballad singers like Bubbi Morthens, and post-rock bands such as Amiina and Sigur Rós. Independent music is strong in Iceland, with bands like múm and solo artists such as Daði Freyr.

Traditional Icelandic music is strongly religious. Hymns, both religious and secular, are a particularly well-developed form of music, due to the scarcity of musical instruments throughout much of Iceland's history. Hallgrímur Pétursson wrote many Protestant hymns in the 17th century. Icelandic music was modernised in the 19th century when Magnús Stephensen brought pipe organs, which were followed by harmoniums. Other vital traditions of Icelandic music are epic, alliterative, and rhyming ballads called rímur. Rímur are epic tales, usually a cappella, which can be traced back to skaldic poetry, using complex metaphors and elaborate rhyme schemes. The best-known rímur poet of the 19th century was Sigurður Breiðfjörð (1798–1846). A modern revitalisation of the tradition began in 1929 with the formation of Kvæðamannafélagið Iðunn.

Among Iceland's best-known classical composers are Daníel Bjarnason and Anna S. Þorvaldsdóttir, who in 2012 received the Nordic Council Music Prize and in 2015 was chosen as the New York Philharmonic's Kravis Emerging Composer, an honour which includes a $50,000 cash prize and a commission to write a composition for the orchestra; she is the second recipient.

The national anthem of Iceland is Lofsöngur, written by Matthías Jochumsson, with music by Sveinbjörn Sveinbjörnsson.

=== Media ===
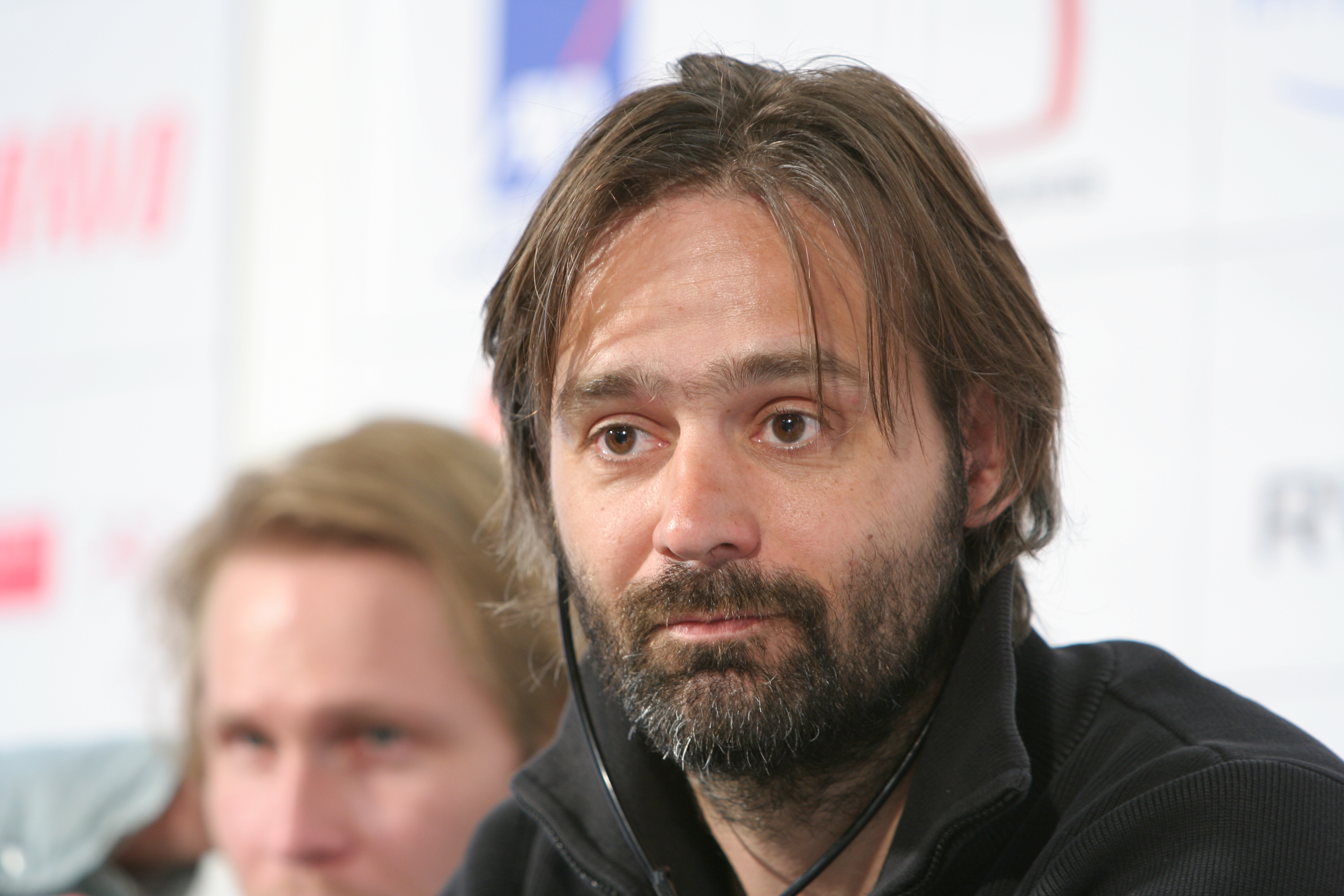
Icelandic director Baltasar Kormákur, best known for the films 101 Reykjavík, Jar City and Contraband, and television series Trapped

Iceland's largest television stations are the state-run Sjónvarpið and the privately owned Stöð 2 and SkjárEinn. Smaller stations exist, many of them local. Radio is broadcast throughout the country including in some parts of the interior. The main radio stations are Rás 1, Rás 2, X-ið 977, Bylgjan and FM957. The daily newspapers are Morgunblaðið and Fréttablaðið. The most popular websites are the news sites Vísir and Mbl.is.

Iceland is home to LazyTown (Icelandic: Latibær), a children's educational musical comedy programme created by Magnús Scheving. It has become a very popular programme for children and adults and is shown in over 100 countries, including the Americas, the UK and Sweden. The LazyTown studios are located in Garðabær. The 2015 television crime series Trapped aired in the UK on BBC4 in February and March 2016, to critical acclaim and according to The Guardian "the unlikeliest TV hit of the year".

In 1992, the Icelandic film industry achieved its greatest recognition hitherto, when Friðrik Þór Friðriksson was nominated for the Academy Award for Best International Feature Film for his Children of Nature. It features the story of an old man who is unable to continue running his farm. After being unwelcome in his daughter's and father-in-law's house in town, he is put in a home for the elderly. There, he meets an old girlfriend from his youth, and they both begin a journey through the wilds of Iceland to die together. This is the only Icelandic movie to have ever been nominated for an Academy Award.

Singer-songwriter Björk received international acclaim for her starring role in the Danish musical drama Dancer in the Dark, directed by Lars von Trier, in which she plays Selma Ježková, a factory worker who struggles to pay for her son's eye operation. The film premiered at the 2000 Cannes Film Festival, where she won the Best Actress Award. The movie also led Björk to nominations for Best Original Song at the 73rd Academy Awards, with the song I've Seen It All and for a Golden Globe Award for Best Actress in a Motion Picture – Drama. Guðrún S. Gísladóttir, who is Icelandic, played one of the major roles in Russian filmmaker Andrei Tarkovsky's film The Sacrifice (1986). Anita Briem, known for her performance in Showtime's The Tudors, is also Icelandic. Briem starred in the film Journey to the Center of the Earth (2008), which shot in Iceland. The James Bond movie Die Another Day (2002) is set for a large part in Iceland. Christopher Nolan's film Interstellar (2014) was also filmed in Iceland for some of its scenes, as was Ridley Scott's Prometheus (2012).

On 17 June 2010, the parliament passed the Icelandic Modern Media Initiative, proposing greater protection of free speech rights and the identity of journalists and whistle-blowers—the strongest journalist protection law in the world. According to a 2024 report by Freedom House, Iceland is one of the highest-ranked countries in press freedom.

CCP Games, developers of the critically acclaimed EVE Online and Dust 514, are headquartered in Reykjavík. CCP Games hosts the third-most populated MMO in the world, which also has the largest total game area for an online game, according to Guinness World Records.

Iceland has a highly developed internet culture, with around 99.8% of the population having internet access, the highest proportion in the world. Iceland ranked 16th in the World Economic Forum's 2016 Network Readiness Index, which measures a country's ability to competitively exploit communications technology. The United Nations International Telecommunication Union ranked the country first in its development of information and communications technology in 2017, having moved up one place from 2016. In February 2013 the country (ministry of the interior) was researching possible methods to protect children in regards to Internet pornography, claiming that pornography online is a threat to children as it supports child slavery and abuse. Strong voices within the community expressed concerns with this, stating that it is impossible to block access to pornography without compromising freedom of speech.

=== Cuisine ===
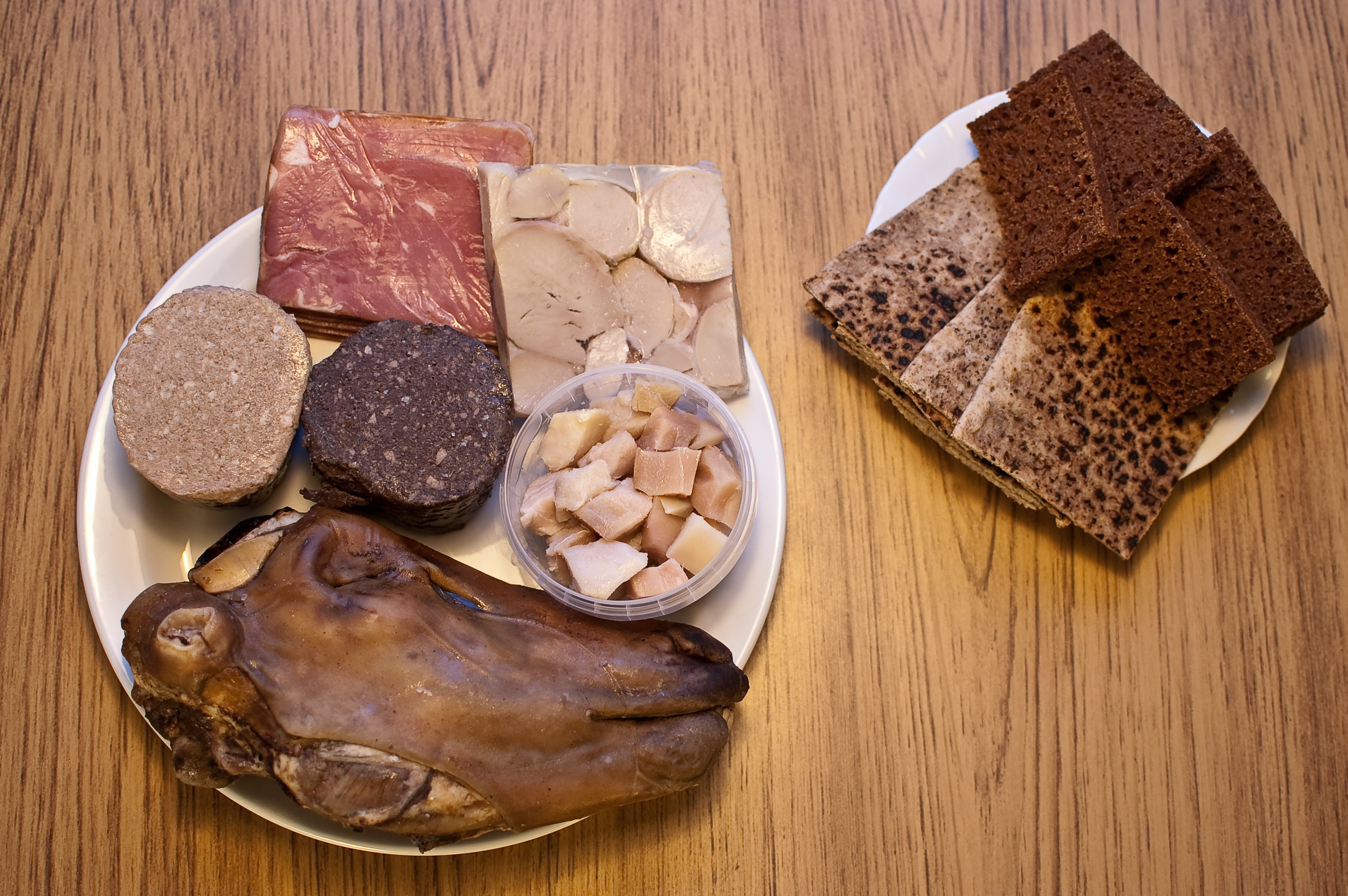
A typical Þorramatur assortment

Much of Iceland's cuisine is based on fish, lamb, and dairy products, with little to no use of herbs or spices. Due to the island's climate, fruits and vegetables are not generally a component of traditional dishes, although the use of greenhouses has made them more common in contemporary food. Þorramatur is a selection of traditional cuisine consisting of many dishes and is usually consumed around the month of Þorri, which begins on the first Friday after 19 January. Traditional dishes also include skyr (a yogurt-like cheese), hákarl (cured shark), cured ram, singed sheep heads, and black pudding, Flatkaka (flatbread), dried fish, and dark rye bread traditionally baked in the ground in geothermal areas. Puffin is considered a local delicacy which is often prepared through broiling.

Breakfast usually consists of pancakes, cereal, fruit, and coffee, while lunch may take the form of a smörgåsbord. The main meal of the day for most Icelanders is dinner, which usually involves fish or lamb as the main course. Seafood is central to most Icelandic cooking, particularly cod and haddock but also salmon, herring, and halibut. It is often prepared in a wide variety of ways, either smoked, pickled, boiled, or dried. Lamb is by far the most common meat, and it tends to be either smoke-cured (known as hangikjöt) or salt-preserved (saltkjöt). Many older dishes make use of every part of the sheep, such as slátur, which consists of offal (internal organs and entrails) minced together with blood and served in the sheep's stomach. Additionally, boiled or mashed potatoes, pickled cabbage, green beans, and rye bread are prevalent side dishes.

Coffee is a popular beverage in Iceland, with the country being third placed by per capita consumption worldwide in 2016, and is drunk at breakfast, after meals, and with a light snack in mid-afternoon. Coca-Cola is also widely consumed, to the extent that the country is said to have one of the highest per capita consumption rates in the world.

Iceland's signature alcoholic beverage is brennivín (literally "burnt [i.e., distilled] wine"), which is similar in flavouring to the akvavit variant of Scandinavian brännvin. It is a type of schnapps made from distilled potatoes and flavoured with either caraway seeds or angelica. Its potency has earned it the nickname svarti dauði ("Black Death"). Modern distilleries on Iceland produce vodka (Reyka), gin (Ísafold), moss schnapps (Fjallagrasa), and a birch-flavoured schnapps and liqueur (Foss Distillery's Birkir and Björk). Martin Miller blends Icelandic water with its England-distilled gin on the island. Strong beer was banned until 1989, so bjórlíki, a mixture of legal, low-alcohol pilsner beer and vodka, became popular. Several strong beers are now made by Icelandic breweries.

=== Sport ===
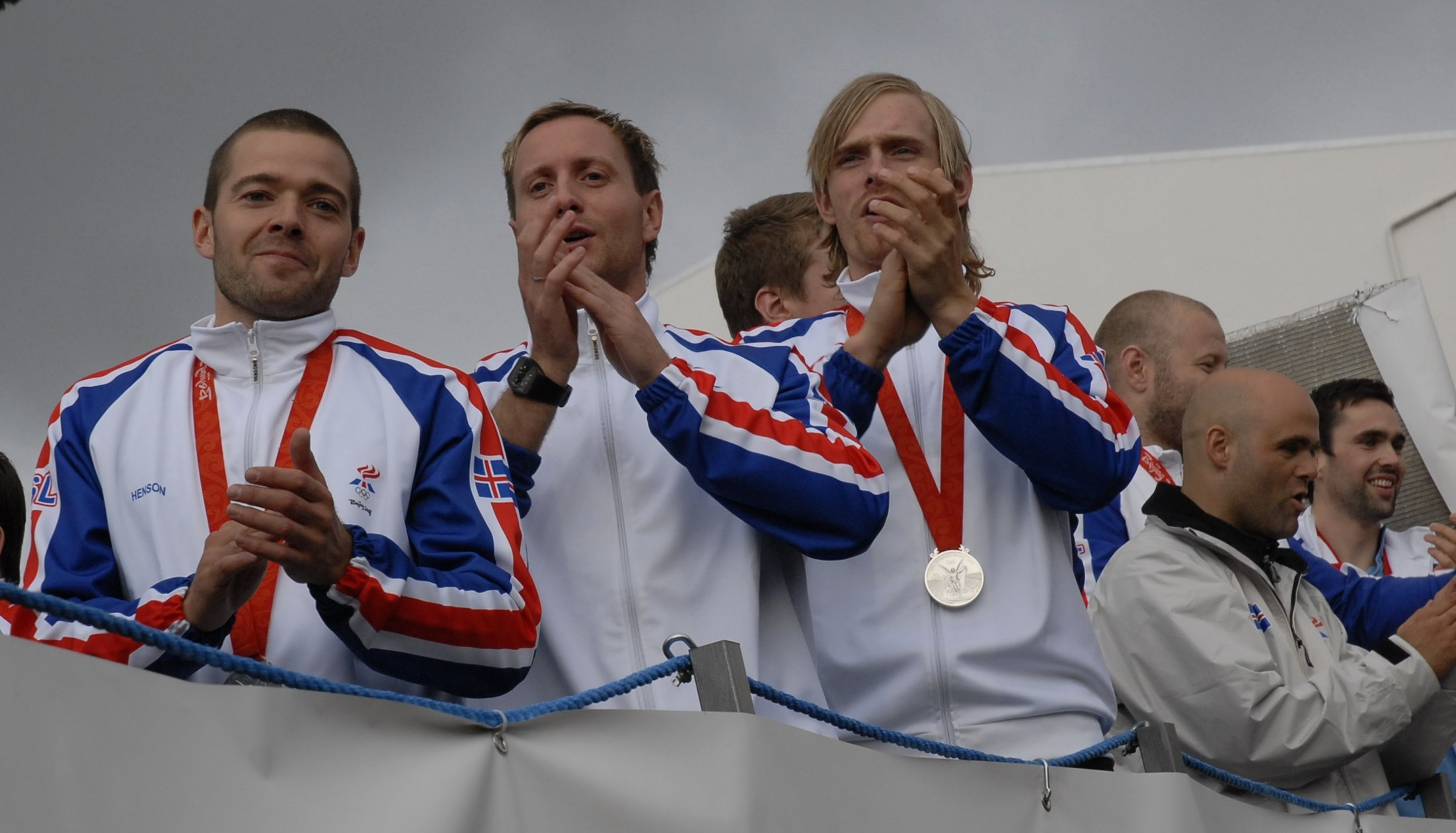
The Iceland men's national handball team (pictured) won the silver medal at the 2008 Summer Olympics. Handball is considered to be Iceland's national sport.

Sport is an important part of Icelandic culture, as the population is generally quite active. The main traditional sport in Iceland is Glíma, a form of wrestling thought to have originated in medieval times.

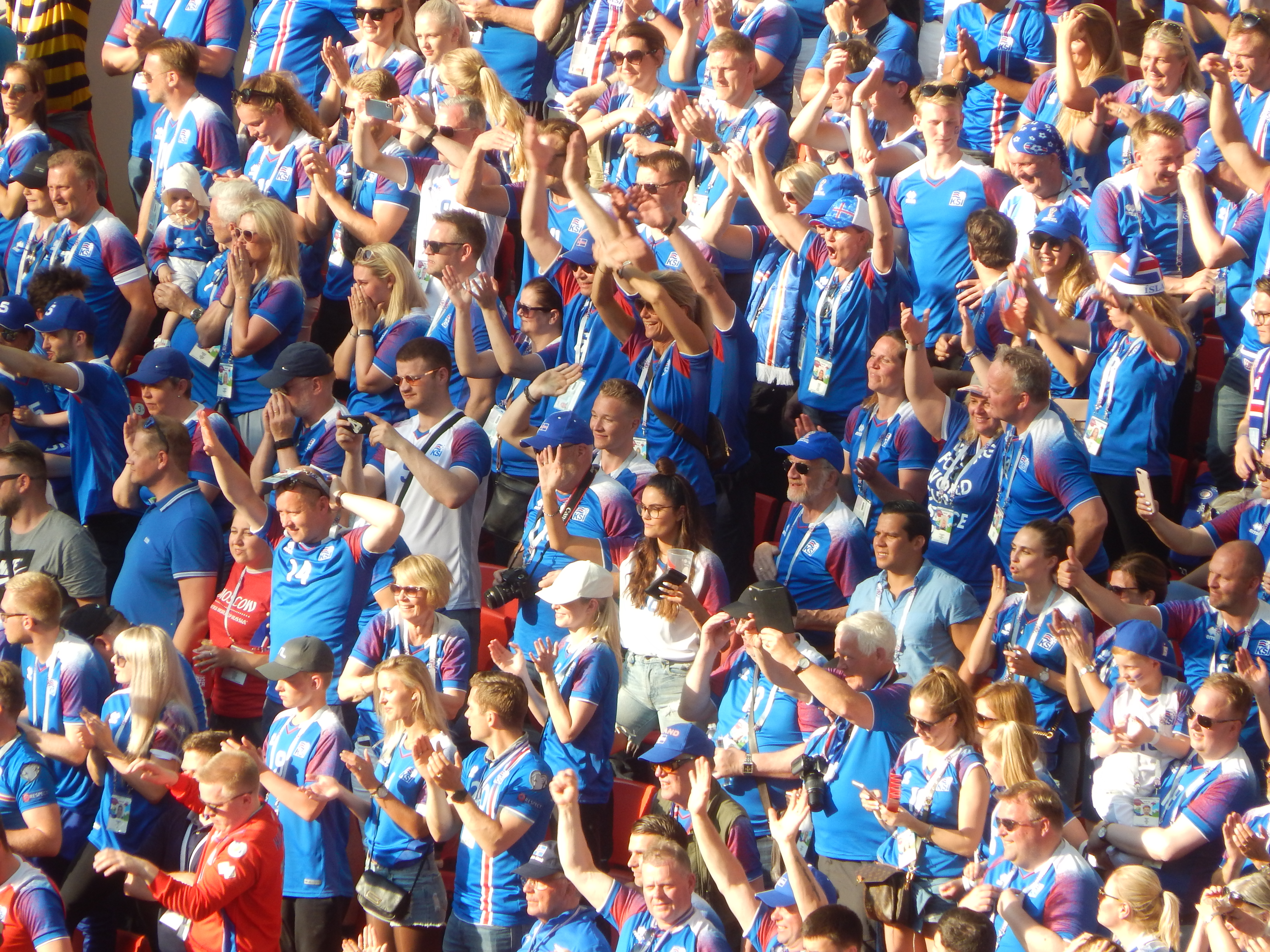
Iceland fans at the 2018 FIFA World Cup at Spartak Stadium in Moscow

Popular sports include football, track and field, handball, and basketball. Handball is often referred to as the national sport. The Icelandic national football team qualified for the 2016 UEFA European football championship for the first time. They recorded a draw against later winners Portugal in the group stage, and defeated England 2–1 in the round of 16, with goals from Ragnar Sigurðsson and Kolbeinn Sigþórsson. They then lost to hosts and later finalists France in the quarter-finals. Afterwards, Iceland made its debut at the 2018 FIFA World Cup. For both the European and the world championships, Iceland was the smallest nation in terms of population to qualify at the time.

Iceland is also the smallest country to ever qualify for Eurobasket, having done so in both 2015 and 2017. However, they have not managed to win a single game in the European Basketball final stages.

Iceland has excellent conditions for skiing, fishing, snowboarding, ice climbing and rock climbing, although mountain climbing and hiking are preferred by the general public. Iceland is also a world-class destination for alpine ski touring and Telemark skiing, with the Troll Peninsula in Northern Iceland being the main centre of activity. Although the country's environment is generally ill-suited for golf, nevertheless there are many golf courses throughout the island and Iceland has a greater percentage of the population playing golf than Scotland, with over 17,000 registered golfers out of a population of approximately 300,000. Iceland hosts an annual international golf tournament known as the Arctic Open played through the night during the summer solstice at Akureyri Golf Club. Iceland has won the second most World's Strongest Man competitions of any country with nine titles, including four each by Magnús Ver Magnússon and Jón Páll Sigmarsson, and most recently by Hafþór Júlíus Björnsson in 2018.

Iceland is also one of the leading countries in ocean rowing. Icelandic explorer and endurance athlete Fiann Paul holds the highest number of performance-based Guinness World Records within a single athletic discipline. As of 2020, he is the first and only person to achieve the Ocean Explorers Grand Slam (performing open-water crossings on each of the five oceans using human-powered vessels) and has claimed overall speed Guinness World Records for the fastest rowing of all four oceans (Atlantic, Indian, Pacific, and the Arctic) in a human-powered row boat. He had achieved 41 records, including 33 performance based Guinness World Records by 2020.

Swimming is popular in Iceland. Geothermally heated outdoor pools are widespread, and swimming courses are a mandatory part of the national curriculum. Horseback riding, which was historically the most prevalent form of transportation on the island, remains a common pursuit for many Icelanders. The oldest sports association in Iceland is the Reykjavík Shooting Association, founded in 1867. Rifle shooting became very popular in the 19th century with the encouragement of politicians and nationalists who pushed for Icelandic independence. Even now, it remains a significant pastime.

Iceland has produced many chess masters and hosted the historic World Chess Championship 1972 in Reykjavík during the height of the Cold War. As of 2008, there have been nine Icelandic chess grandmasters, a considerable number relative to the small size of the population of the country. Bridge is also popular, with Iceland participating in several international tournaments. Iceland won the world bridge championship (the Bermuda Bowl) in Yokohama, Japan in 1991 and came in second place (with Sweden) in Hamilton, Bermuda, in 1950.

== See also ==
- Outline of Iceland
- Index of Iceland-related articles
