= Internet in Iceland =

Iceland is among the top countries in the world in terms of Internet deployment and use. 99.68% of Icelanders used the internet in 2021.

As of April 2026, Iceland is listed 6th in the world for fixed access download speeds according to Speedtest.net at 343 Mbit/s. 97.5% of households are connected to full-fibre (FTTH) networks in 2025, with at least 1 Gbit/s speeds available to all fibre users and 10 Gbit/s available to most. Iceland has 208.8 Tbit/s of international submarine bandwidth capacity through four cables.

Míla operates the largest national trunk network, copper and PON (FTTH) fibre access network. Ljósleiðarinn, originally a fully municipal owned network, operates a competing national trunk and PTP ethernet fibre network, as well as a XGS-PON network. Smaller local ISPs operate locally. Síminn, Sýn and Nova are the Iargest ISPs in Iceland.

ISNIC is the Icelandic domain registry for its country-code top level domain, .is. It is a member of the RIPE NCC, Europe's regional Internet registry. ISNIC also operate Iceland's only open-policy internet exchange point, the Reykjavík Internet Exchange (RIX). CERT-IS manages Iceland's national cyber-security.

== Access technology ==
Full-fibre is the most common connection medium (FTTH/FTTB, through both PTP and GPON). A minority of rural connections are provided by legacy Digital Subscriber Lines (DSL), including VDSL and ADSL. Satellite internet and fixed wireless solutions are used in the most remote of locations.

At the end of 2025, as per the Electronic Communications Office of Iceland:

- 95.7% of broadband is provided using optical fibre (FTTH).
- 3.8% of broadband is provided by DSL (FTTC).
- 0.4% of access is provided by satellite internet
- 0.1% of access is provided by fixed wireless

In terms of advertised download speeds:

- 1.1% of connections are over 2500 Mbit/s
- 53.9% of connections are between 1000 and 2500 Mbit/s.
- 40.4% of connections are between 500 and 1000 Mbit/s.
- Less than 5% of connections are below 1000 Mbit/s.

Over 97.5% of homes in Iceland have full fibre access. Míla offers a XGS-PON/GPON network with a minimum flat rate delivered at 1 Gbit/s, and additional access tiers of 2.5, 5 and 10 Gbit/s. Ljósleiðarinn's network is based on a PTP ethernet network, with a minimum flat rate delivered at 1 Gbit/s and also offers up to 10 Gbit/s service by PTP and XGS-PON. Ljósleiðarinn's full fibre network extended to 100% of the Reykjavík capital area by 2016 and smaller towns such as Reykjanesbær, Akranes, Þorlákshöfn, Hella, Selfoss and Hvolsvöllur by 2017. Míla operates full-fibre access networks in most urban areas of Iceland but does not have as complete coverage of the Reykjavík area.

There are other smaller fibre networks run by local municipalities and companies, a major one being Tengir in the north east of Iceland providing a fibre network to Akureyri and surrounding regions offering up to >1 Gbit/s speeds.

=== Rural Access ===
The government has engaged in a programme called Ísland Ljóstengt running from 2016 to 2022 which funded FTTH deployment to 5,500 rural locations. In 2022, around 1,800 locations remained that only had ADSL service (lower than 10 Mbit/s speed), accounting for 1.3% of connections at the time. Many rural towns in Iceland dependent on VDSL and were out of the scope of previous funding as it only applied to farms and extra-urban locations.

The Government of Iceland stated in 2024 that their goal is for 100% of homes and businesses to have access to full fibre internet by the year 2026, by issuing grants to telecom operators to upgrade to full fibre connections in rural towns where it is currently uneconomical to do so.

As of 2022 there are also 64,000 active data-only 4G/5G subscriptions, mainly used for second homes and Mi-Fi devices, as well as serving as an alternative to fixed-line services. Starlink began offering Low Earth Orbit (LEO) satellite internet access in Iceland in February 2023, although a local gateway has not been established.

== Internet Service Providers ==
Internet service in Iceland is divided between the international providers, national ISP and access network providers.

=== International Providers ===
The only international providers are Farice ehf. and Tusass A/S (as per the subsea connections listed in the section below).

=== National ISPs ===
National ISPs contract the international bandwidth and manage services for the customer.

Top 4 National ISPs
| Name | Fixed-Internet | Managed IPTV | Landline (VoIP) | Market Share (2024) |
|---|---|---|---|---|
| Síminn | Yes | Yes | Yes | 44.4% |
| Sýn | Yes | Yes | Yes | 24.8% |
| NOVA | Yes | No | No | 18.4% |
| Hringdu | Yes | No | Yes | 10.1% |

Others ISPs constitute 2.4% of the market (Hrigiðan, Snerpa, Origo etc.).

=== Access Operators ===
The following operators offer access networks. Míla operates a national fibre and copper access network (incumbent). The others operate full fibre networks. Ljósleiðarinn is the second largest network, covering most towns in the southwest of the country. Other networks cover regional areas and municipal networks.

- Míla
- Ljósleiðarinn
- Tengir
- Snerpa
- Others (municipal networks etc.)

As of 2024, Neyðarlínan, the state-owned emergency communications operator, is the current universal service provider. Until 2024, the universal service provider was former incumbent Míla (formerly Síminn).

== International/Submarine connectivity ==
Iceland is currently connected with four submarine communications cables to Europe and North America: Iceland has access to a total capacity of 208.8 Tbit/s capacity as of 2023. According to Farice ehf., as of 2023, a total of 3 Tbit/s of capacity is currently being utilised for international bandwidth in Iceland.

Submarine Cables connected to Iceland
| Name | Year Launched | Operator | Landing point, Iceland | External Landing Point | No. of fibre pairs | Distance | Original Design Capacity | Current Design Capacity | Status |
|---|---|---|---|---|---|---|---|---|---|
| IRIS | 2023 | Farice ehf. | Þorlákshöfn | Galway, Ireland | 6 | 1,770 km | 108 Tbit/s | 145 Tbit/s | Active |
| DANICE | 2009 | Farice ehf. | Landeyjasandur | Blaabjerg, Denmark | 4 | 2,304 km | 5.12 Tbit/s | 40 Tbit/s | Active |
| Greenland Connect | 2009 | Tusass A/S | Landeyjasandur | Qaqortoq, Greenland; Nuuk, Greenland; Newfoundland and Labrador, Canada | 2 | 4,580 km | 1.92 Tbit/s | 12.8 Tbit/s | Active |
| FARICE | 2004 | Farice ehf. | Seyðisfjörður | Funningsfjørður, Faroe Islands and Dunnet Bay, Scotland. | 2 | 1,205 km | 720 Gbit/s | 11 Tbit/s | Active |

Most of Iceland's growth in international bandwidth is due to data center investment in the country, the domestic internet market is fairly saturated.

The main provider of international capacity to Europe is the state-owned Farice ehf. with Tusass providing direct services to Greenland and North America.

=== International Latency ===
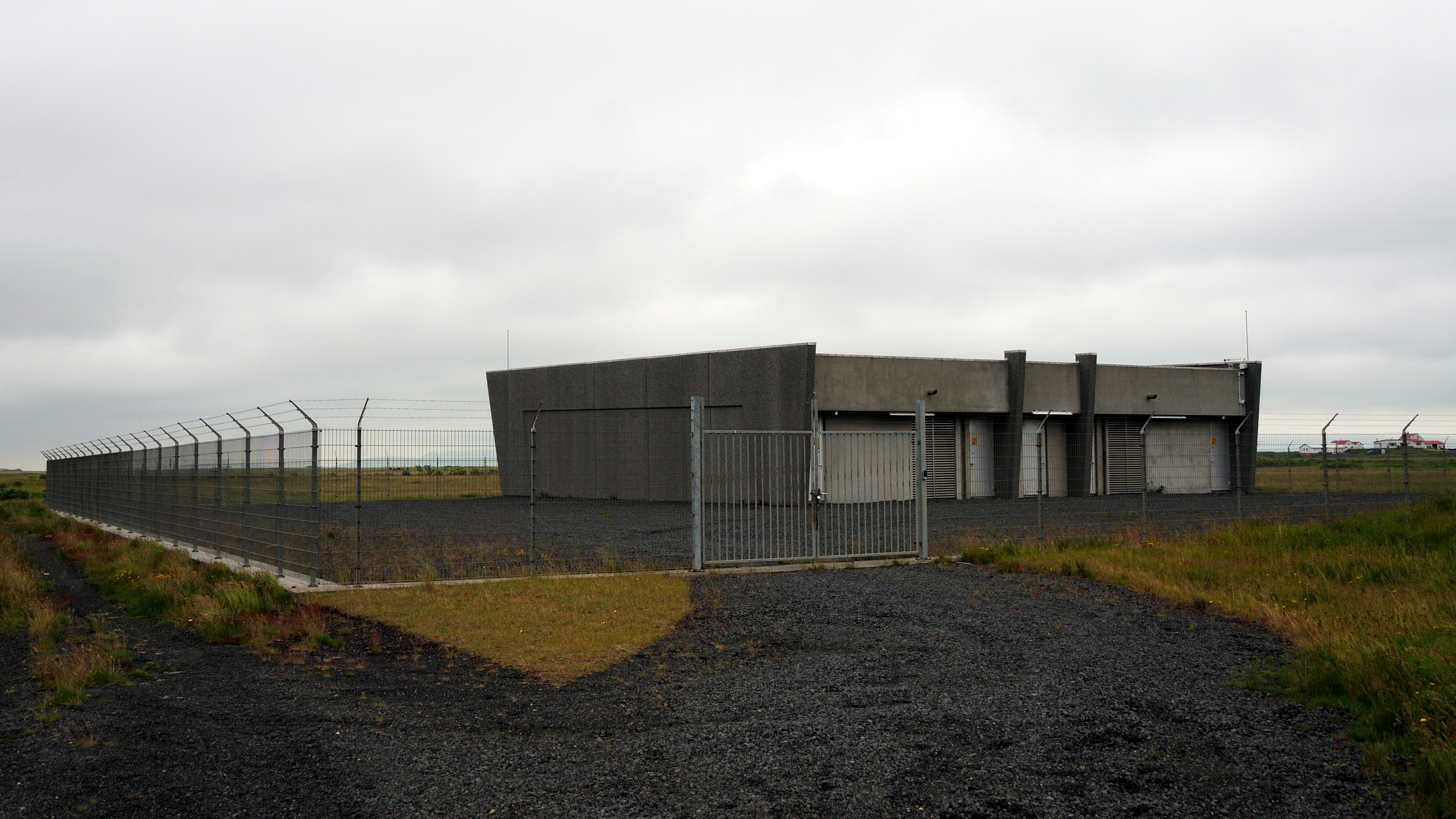
Landing station in Landeyjar, terminating the DANICE and Greenland Connect cables.

As Iceland is geographically situated in the mid-atlantic, it has shorter ping times to locations to Europe than North America. Here are a few examples of nominal ping times from Iceland:

- Dublin: 10.5 ms (via IRIS)
- Glasgow: 13.0 ms
- Copenhagen: 14.9 ms
- London: 15 ms (via IRIS)
- Amsterdam: 17.8 ms
- Budapest: 26.0 ms
- New York: 40 ms (via Greenland Connect or IRIS)
- Halifax: 33.7 ms (via Greenland Connect)

== Domestic Backbone ==
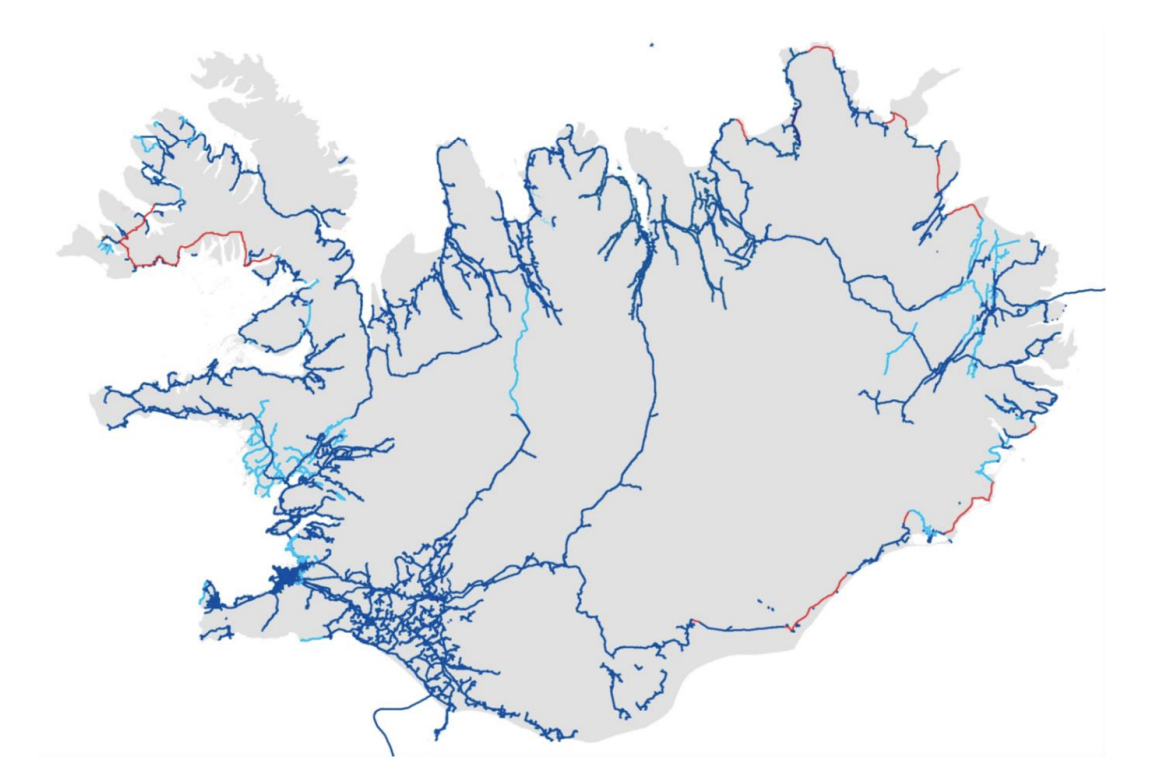
Map of fibre routes in Iceland (2021), excluding NATO fibre ring.

Iceland's domestic internet backbone is composed of many fibre routes, with microwave links serving the most isolated communities. Iceland's backbone is operated by two companies; Míla and Ljósleiðarinn. Other companies also operate their own backbone networks, such as Orkufjarskipti (owned by electricity utilities Landsvirkjun and Landsnet).

The most historically critical part of Iceland's internet infrastructure is a fibre ring that circles the country, roughly following the route of Iceland's ring road (Route 1), passing through most towns and cities. It is still an important part of Iceland's internet backbone, but has been duplicated on most routes by private companies. It was constructed in 1989–1991 by the Icelandic Government and NATO to link radar stations of the Iceland Air Defence System. It consists of 8 fibres, 1 of which are for use by NATO, 5 by Míla and 2 leased to Ljósleiðarinn.

== National Educational and Research Network ==
Universities and research institutions are connected by RHnet, Iceland's national education and research network (NERN). It is connected to the wider Nordic educational network, NORDUnet and European educational network, GÉANT. The origins of Iceland's internet stem from this network through Hafrannsóknastofnun and in turn the University of Iceland, first being connected in 1986.

== Use ==
Internet access is widespread in Iceland and there has been rapid growth in use since the early 2000s. Data compiled by the Organisation for Economic Co-operation and Development (OECD) shows Iceland with:

- 99.68% of Icelanders used in the internet in 2021.
- 99.5% of businesses using the Internet in 2009-2010 (2nd out of 31)

The Global Information Technology Report 2010–2011 by the World Economic Forum ranked Iceland:

- 1st out of 138 in terms of Internet users (93.5% of the population used the Internet in 2009)
- 1st out of 138 in the use of virtual social networks (a score of 6.8 in 2009–2010, where 1 is not at all and 7 is widely)
- 1st out of 138 in terms of Internet access in schools (a score of 6.76 in 2009–2010, where 1 is very limited and 7 is extensive)
- 1st out of 138 in accessibility of digital content (a score of 6.62 in 2009–2010, where 1 is not accessible at all and 7 is widely accessible)
- 1st out of 137 in the number of secure Internet servers (1,711.3 servers per million population in 2009)
- 4th out of 138 in the extent of business Internet use (a score of 6.58 in 2009–2010, where 1 is not at all and 7 is extensively)
- 5th out of 138 in terms of international Internet bandwidth (626.8 Mbit/s per 10,000 population in 2009)
- 12th out of 138 in terms of laws related to information and communication technology (a score of 5.46 in 2009–2010, where 1 is nonexistent and 7 is well developed)
- 25th out of 138 in terms of intellectual property protection (a score of 5.09 in 2009–2010, where 1 is very weak and 7 is very strong)
- 35th out of 107 in the use of unlicensed software (an estimated 49% of software was unlicensed in 2009)
- 45th out of 138 in terms of freedom of the press (a score of 5.76 in 2009–2010, where 1 is totally restricted and 7 is completely free)

== History ==
Iceland's first connection to the internet was in 1986 through Hafrannsóknastofnun to Amsterdam, eventually expanding to the University of Iceland and eventually becoming ISnet (now Internet á Íslandi hf)., which in turn became ISNIC, the manager of the ".is" domain. The development of Iceland's internet per ISnet, are listed in the table below:

| Year | Connection Type | Medium | Bandwidth | Endpoint | Total Int. Bandwidth |
|---|---|---|---|---|---|
| 1986 to 1989 | UUCP | Satellite | 300-1200 bit/s | Amsterdam | 300-1200 bit/s |
| 1989-07-21 | IP over X.25 | Satellite | 2400 bit/s | Denmark | 2400 bit/s |
| 1990-07-24 | Leased Line | Satellite | 9.6 kbit/s | Stockholm | 9.6 kbit/s |
| 1992-05-07 | Leased Line | Satellite | 56 kbit/s | Stockholm | 56 kbit/s |
| 1994-05-17 | Leased Line | Satellite | 128 kbit/s | Stockholm | 128 kbit/s |
| 1995-03-13 | Leased Line | Satellite | 256 kbit/s | Stockholm | 256 kbit/s |
| 1995-09-01 | Leased Line | CANTAT-3 | 1 Mbit/s | Stockholm | 1 Mbit/s |
| 1996-05-09 | Leased Line | CANTAT-3 | 2 Mbit/s | Stockholm | 2 Mbit/s |
| 1997-03-14 | Leased Line | CANTAT-3 | 2 Mbit/s | U.S.A. | 5.952 Mbit/s |
| 1997-06-23 | Leased Line | CANTAT-3 | 4 Mbit/s | U.S.A | 3.968 Mbit/s |
| 1998-03-05 | Leased Line | CANTAT-3 | 6 Mbit/s | U.S.A | 7.936 Mbit/s |
| 1998-11-06 | Leased Line | CANTAT-3 | 8 Mbit/s | U.S.A. | 9.92 Mbit/s |
| 1998-11-18 | Leased Line | CANTAT-3 | 4 Mbit/s | Stockholm | 11.904 Mbit/s |
| 1999-03-24 | Leased Line | CANTAT-3 | 10 Mbit/s | U.S.A. | 13.888 Mbit/s |
| 1999-09-10 | Leased Line | CANTAT-3 | 45 Mbit/s | U.S.A. | 48.178 Mbit/s |

- In 1986 Iceland obtained a UUCP connection between the Marine Research Institute in Iceland to EUnet (European Unix Network) headquarters in Amsterdam by satellite. The connection provided e-mail and Usenet services. Bandwidth was between 300 and 1200 bits per second (bit/s).
- In 1989 a connection to the Internet was established using IP over X.25 with NORDUnet in Denmark at 2400 bit/s.
- In 1990 a leased line connection to NORDUnet in Stockholm operating at 9600 bit/s was established. This link was upgraded to operate at 56,000 bit/s in 1992, 128,000 bit/s in 1994, 256,000 bit/s and then 1,000,000 bit/s in 1995, and 1,984,000 in 1996.
- In 1991 the NATO fibre ring was completed, serving as an important part of Iceland's domestic telecom/internet backbone.
- The submarine cable CANTAT-3, began operation in 1994. It was Iceland's first packet-switched submarine connection and had a capacity of 2 x 2.5 Gbit/s to Denmark, Germany, the Faroe Islands and Canada, representing a large increase in international capacity at the time. It was notoriously unreliable, with an average of one cable cut per year. The cable became obsolete and out of operational use from Iceland in 2010 with the introduction of DANICE.
- In 1994 the first commercial Internet services, Midheimar ehf, opened with SLIP/PPP access giving people access to the web for the first time from their homes.
- In March 1997 ISnet (a collective term for the Icelandic segments of NORDUnet and EUnet) established a direct connection to Teleglobe in Montreal, Canada at 9600 bit/s. to supplement the European connection. This line was moved to New York City and upgraded to 48,178,001 bit/s in September 1999.
- 1999 marked the first year ADSL services were available in Iceland.
- Broadband internet access gained rapid popularity in Iceland due to the early use of IPTV technologies in the early 2000s. Cable and Satellite TV services are next to nonexistent and therefore the provision of TV through DSL or fibre was in high demand.
- In January 2004 the submarine communications fibre cable system FARICE-1 was put into commercial operation with a design capacity of 720 Gbit/s and lit capacity of 20 Gbit/s.
- 2004 FTTH trials began with Ljósleiðarinn building a fibre optic network, operating through a subsidiary called Gagnveita Reykjavíkur (GR) with a 100 Mbit/s connection.
- In 2007, Seltjarnarnes became the world's first town where every citizen had access to fibre optics.
- In 2008, xDSL use peaked in Iceland with 98% of connections.
- In September 2009 the submarine communications fibre cable DANICE was put into commercial operation with an original design capacity of 5120 Gbit/s. Additionally, Greenland Connect was laid at the same time.
- From 2009, VDSL services became active from Míla in Reykjavík and larger towns offering 50-100 Mbit/s services.
- In October 2016, Ljósleiðarinn upgraded its network from 100 Mbit to 1 Gbit/s symmetric connections to all customers.
- In 2018, full fibre connections surpassed xDSL use for the first time.
- 2018 marked the year that 100% of homes in the Reykjavík area had FTTH access.
- In 2022, Síminn completed the sale of its wholesale access and backbone network, Míla, to Ardian.
- In 2022, Ljósleiðarinn took over Vodafone Iceland's national backbone including their one pair on the NATO fibre ring. Additionally, the government leased one of the NATO ring pairs by competitive tender to Ljósleiðarinn.
- In February 2023, SpaceX's Starlink became available in Iceland.
- In March 2023, the IRIS submarine cable system was ready for service, more than doubling Iceland's international bandwidth capacity with a new route to Ireland.
- In October 2023, both major access network operators, Míla and Ljósleiðarinn, began to offer 2.5, 5 and 10 Gbit/s residential fibre connections.
- In 2023, the last DOCSIS cable network in Iceland in Reykjanesbær was shut down and replaced by full fibre connections.
- In 2024, Míla announced a full copper phase-out including the closure of DSL connections on a rolling basis by 2028.
- In 2024, Neyðarlínan (state-owned emergency communications operator) took over from Míla as the universal service provider.

== Censorship ==
Censorship is prohibited by the Icelandic Constitution and there is a strong tradition of protecting freedom of expression that extends to the use of the Internet. This is mirrored by Iceland being rated the most free of the 70 countries in Freedom House's Freedom On the Net 2022 Reportat all. However, questions about how best to protect children, fight terrorism, prevent libel, and protect the rights of copyright holders are ongoing in Iceland as they are in much of the world.

The five Nordic countries—Denmark, Finland, Norway, Sweden, and Iceland—are central players in the European battle between file sharers, rights holders, and Internet service providers (ISPs). While each country determines its own destiny, the presence of the European Union (EU) is felt in all legal controversies and court cases. Iceland, while not a member of the EU, is part of the European Economic Area (EEA) and has agreed to enact legislation similar to that passed in the EU in areas such as consumer protection and business law.

Internet service providers in Iceland use filters to block Web sites distributing child pornography. Iceland's ISPs in cooperation with Barnaheill—Save the Children Iceland participate in the International Association of Internet Hotlines (INHOPE) project. Suspicious links are reported by organizations and the general public and passed on to relevant authorities for verification.

In 2012 and 2013 Ögmundur Jónasson, Minister of Interior, proposed two bills to the Icelandic parliament that would limit Icelander's access to the Internet. The first proposed limitations on gambling and the second on pornography. Neither bill was passed by the Icelandic parliament and a new government has since been formed following the parliamentary election held on 27 April 2013.

=== History ===
On 10 June 2009 the two major ISPs in Iceland, Vodafone Iceland and Iceland Telecom at the behest of SAFT (Save the Children Iceland) and other interest groups instated a null route on the website ringulreid.org, making it inaccessible to most commercial Internet users in Iceland. Other members of the Reykjavik Internet Exchange did not institute the null route, but both Vodafone and Síminn blocked it at their Icelandic routers.

The ringulreid.org domain subsequently expired and the site was taken down by its operator. But a similar site slembingur.org sprang up to replace it.

Both Vodafone Iceland and Síminn updated their blocks to null route 83.99.152.251, the IP address slembingur.org resolves to. ringulreid.org was a 4chan-like image board in the Icelandic language which had been making the news for cyber-bullying, child porn and similar material. The administrators of the site had rejected these accusations, citing their strict policies of banning users who posted child pornography. ringulreid.org had been set up after a similar site, handahof.org, had been voluntarily closed down by its operator on request of the Iceland Capital Police following their investigation into the matter.

The block against ringulreid.org was instated at the behest of the National Police of Iceland, Iceland Capital Police, the Child Protection Authority of Iceland (part of the Iceland Ministry of Social Affairs), Save the Children Iceland (SAFT) (a private organization) and various other private and government groups, which made public statements encouraging all internet service providers in the country to block access to the site.

Thus the censorship in Iceland is not explicitly government mandated, but implemented voluntarily by private corporations in response to pressure from government and private institutions. Vodafone conducted a legal review to investigate whether it was within its rights to restrict access to the website, and after finding that they were within their rights instituted the block.

In a statement two days after the initial block Hrannar Pétursson, the press secretary for Vodafone, indicated that it was not on Vodafone's agenda to implement a more general censoring mechanism, but as ringulreid.org was an "exaggerated example of such a case" Vodafone considered the act justifiable. His colleague Margrét Stefánsdóttir at Síminn echoed those remarks, saying that Síminn would never close a page on its own initiative, but when faced with such serious requests they were compelled to act.

Since slembingur.org is hosted on a shared web hosting service, and the block takes the form of a null route any other sites that happen to share the same IP address are also blocked. As of 30 September 2010 these were the private E-Mail gateway ns1.bighost.lv, the cosmetics manufacturer saulesfabrika.com, the construction company timbersolution.com, the printing house veiters.com and the boilerplate site ventus.lv. As of 8 February 2011, slembingur.org had changed IP addresses and is therefore no longer blocked by Vodafone. The null route is still in place, so collateral damage is the only result from this incident.

== See also ==
- Telecommunications in Iceland
- .is domain
- Reykjavik Internet Exchange (RIX)
- CANTAT-3
- FARICE
- DANICE
- Greenland Connect
- Síminn
- Sýn
- Internet censorship by country
