= Telecommunications in Iceland =

Telecommunications in Iceland are a diversified market. Iceland has a highly developed telecommunications sector with modern infrastructure. Multiple wholesale and retail providers operate in a competitive market. As of 2024, Iceland's telecom infrastructure is fully digitised and largely fibre-based, with 93% of households having full-fibre availability. Landlines are based on VoIP technology, and mobile telecoms in Iceland adhere to the GSM standard. 2G, 3G, 4G, and 5G services are available, as well as a TETRA network for emergency communications. Iceland is connected by four submarine cables to Europe and North America. Broadcasting is based on the DVB-T2 standard for television and FM for radio. There are printed newspapers, although most mass media is consumed online. Postal service is provided under universal obligation by the state-owned Iceland Post, but other private postal companies are in operation.

== History ==
The first submarine telegraph cable connection to the British Isles reached Seyðisfjörður in Iceland in 1906, by the Great Northern Telegraph Company, around the same time telephone communication was opened between Reykjavik and nearby Hafnarfjörður. By 1911, a telephone line connected Reykjavik in the west of Iceland to Seyðisfjörður in the east via Akureyri in the north. A line to the Vestmannaeyjar was constructed a few years later, and by 1929, a line along the south coast of the island connected Reykjavik to Seyðisfjörður via Vík, completing the ring around Iceland.

As a backup to the submarine telegraph cable, and for wider communications to other countries and ships, the Wireless Telegraphy Station in Melarnir was built in 1918. It operated using a T-antenna hung from two 77-metre-tall (253 ft) masts and was known as Reykjavík Radio, call sign TFA. It was a breakthrough in maritime safety in Iceland as ships were able to communicate with land for the first time. The transmissions were moved in 1953 to a site in Gufunes and Rjúpnahæð.

A teleprinter service was introduced to the island in 1930. As of 1933, there were 55 telephones for every 1000 inhabitants on the island. The first short-wave radio station was established in Iceland in 1935–36, linking the country up to international radio-telephone services. By January 1936, there were 106 radio-license holders for every 1000 Icelandic inhabitants. Due to the Icelandic naming system, people were listed by their first name in the telephone directory, and not by their last name (which is usually a patronym). The first automatic telephone exchanges opened in Reykjavík and Hafnafjörður in 1932, and by 1976, all towns had automatic telephone exchanges.

In 1962, the SCOTICE (to Scotland) and ICECAN (Canada) coaxial submarine telephone cables were put into use, greatly increasing the reliability and capacity of international telephone and telegraph traffic and opening up telex services for the first time. These new cables rendered the original 1906 telegraph cable obsolete and discontinued. They had a capacity of 32 and 24 telephone circuits, respectively.

In 1980, the first satellite ground station was opened in Iceland, called Skyggnir. Initially connecting to the Intelsat system, most international telephone and telex traffic now used satellite communications. These new ground stations enabled International Direct Dialling, as well as allowing Iceland to access time-shifted and live television broadcast material from abroad, including Iceland's participation in Eurovision in 1986. Iceland's first internet connection was via satellite in 1986 with a 300–1200 bit/s UUCP link to Amsterdam. By 1987, the older coaxial submarine cables SCOTICE and ICECAN were discontinued after a secondary backup ground station opened near Höfn in eastern Iceland, leaving Iceland solely dependent on satellite communications for international traffic during this period.

The first digital telephone exchange was opened in 1984, and all telephone exchanges were digitalised in the country by 1995. By 1986, all rural shared party lines were upgraded to individual lines. In 1986, mobile telephony became available for the first time via an NMT 1G (first-generation) network, followed by GSM services in 1994, SMS in 1997, and MMS in 2003. In 1991, a fibre ring was completed that circles the country, roughly following the route of Iceland's ring road (Route 1), passing through most towns and cities. It was constructed by the Icelandic Government and NATO to link radar stations of the Iceland Air Defence System, and to enhance domestic telecommunications. It consists of 8 fibres and is still in use as of 2023.

In 1994, the first fibre submarine cable, CANTAT-3, reached Iceland, linking it to Canada, Germany, the UK, and Denmark with a capacity of 7.5 Gbit/s. This greatly increased bandwidth and allowed internet connections to become more widely available. As bandwidth and reliability demands grew in the 21st century, more fibre submarine cables were launched to Iceland: FARICE in 2003 to the UK and Faroe Islands; DANICE in 2009 to Denmark; Greenland Connect in 2009 to Greenland and Canada, and lastly IRIS in 2023 to Ireland. With multiple redundant submarine fibre routes, the satellite ground station Skyggnir was decommissioned in 2005 and CANTAT-3 became defunct in 2009.

In the mid-1990s, the telecom market was opened to competition, breaking the state-owned Iceland Telecom's monopoly, and it was later privatised in 2005. In 1994, dial-up internet services became available; in 1999, ADSL services launched, followed by VDSL in 2009. Fibre-to-the-home services began rolling out in 2004 and had expanded to 90% of the population by 2022. In 2010, the NMT (1G) mobile network was shut down. 3G launched in 2006, 4G in 2013, and 5G in 2020. In 2018, telegram services were discontinued. Analogue PSTN/POTS and ISDN telephone services (along with dial-up internet) were phased out from 2020 to 2024, replaced by VoIP services. Copper-based DSL services continue to be available. In April 2024, Míla announced plans for a complete copper shutdown by 2028, including DSL services, fully transitioning Icelandic telecoms to fibre-based services. 2G and 3G services were due to be shut down by the of end 2025.

== Submarine connectivity ==
Current internet and telephone services rely on submarine communications cables for external traffic, with a total capacity of 60.2 Tbit/s.

=== Current ===
- FARICE-1, 2 fiber pairs, with lit 11 Tbit/s to the United Kingdom and the Faroe Islands laid in 2003
- DANICE, 4 fiber pairs, with lit 36.4 Tbit/s to Denmark, laid in 2009.
- Greenland Connect, 2 fiber pairs, with lit 12.8 Tbit/s to Newfoundland and Labrador, Canada and Greenland, laid in 2009.
- IRIS, 6 fiber pairs, with 108 Tbit/s initial capacity to Galway, Ireland, laid in 2022 and opened in March 2023.

=== Former ===
- CANTAT-3, 3 fiber pairs, with capacity of 7.5 Gbit/s to Denmark, Germany, Faroe Islands and Canada (1994–2009)
- SCOTICE, coaxial cable, to Faroe Islands and from there to Scotland, 32 telephone circuits (1961–1987)
- ICECAN, coaxial cable, to Greenland and onward to Canada, 24 telephone circuits (1961–1987)
- Great Northern Telegraph Co., Seyðisfjörður to Faroe Islands and onward to Shetland Islands (UK) (1906–1962)

== Services ==
=== Internet ===
==== Internet service providers ====
The largest Internet service providers in Iceland:

1. Síminn
2. Sýn
3. Nova
4. Hringiðan (Hringiðan ehf / Vortex)
5. Hringdu (Hringdu ehf)

==== Data centres ====
- Advania Iceland
- DataCell ehf.
- Verne Global
- Basis ehf.

==== Internet hosting service ====
Iceland has numerous internet hosting services:

- 1984 ehf.
- Advania Iceland
- FlokiNET ehf.
- Síminn
- Nethönnun ehf.
- TechSupport á Íslandi ehf.
- Tölvuþjónustan Geymir sf.
- Sýn
- Vortex (Hringiðan ehf)

==== Internet exchange points ====
Iceland has two Internet exchange points. They are the Reykjavik Internet Exchange (RIX) and Múli-IXP.

=== Mail ===
Íslandspóstur is the national postal service of Iceland and operates under a universal service obligation. Other private companies also operate, such as DHL, UPS, and FedEx.

=== Print ===
==== Daily newspapers ====
- Morgunblaðið

==== Other newspapers ====
- Viðskiptablaðið
- Bændablaðið
- Heimildin
- Iceland Review
- The Reykjavík Grapevine

=== Radio ===
Iceland uses FM radio broadcasts; all stations are also available over internet radio, with some smaller stations being only distributed over internet radio. Nationwide networks which cover the whole country include public radio stations Rás 1 and Rás 2 as well as Bylgjan. Other commercial broadcasters mostly operate in the Reykjavík area, and many are available in more populated areas.

==== Public broadcasters: ====
- RÚV (nationwide coverage)
  - Rás 1
  - Rás 2
- BBC World Service

===== Commercial broadcasters =====
- Bylgjan (nationwide coverage)
- K100
- FM 957
- X-ið
- Suðurland FM
- Útvarp Saga
- KissFM
- Gullbylgjan
- Léttbylgjan
- Íslenska Bylgjan
- Retro 89.5
- Flashback 91.9
- Lindin

=== Telephone ===
==== Landline ====
As of 2022 there are 116,142 landlines in use in Iceland. The number of landlines in Iceland has been slowly decreasing since their peak in 2001 at 196,528. Analogue PSTN/POTS and ISDN telephone services were phased out from 2020 to 2024, replaced by VoIP services.

==== Mobile ====
As of 2022, there are 521,722 active mobile subscriptions in use in Iceland. 4G and 5G services are operated by 3 mobile operators, and 2G and 3G are still in operation until 2025. NOVA was the first network to offer 4G in 2013 and first to offer 5G in 2020. Síminn and Vodafone launched their 4G service in 2013 and 5G in 2021. 2G and 3G services are due to be shut down in 2025. The NMT (1G) network was shut down in 2010.

==== Telephone numbers ====
There are no area codes in Iceland as such, and all ordinary telephone numbers have seven digits. The international dialling code is +354. Numbers of mobile phones tend to begin with either 6, 7 or 8, while landline numbers start with 5 (in Reykjavík) or 4 (outside Reykjavík).

=== Television ===
Television in Iceland began in September 1966 by the public broadcaster RÚV. Iceland's television distribution is based on the DVB-T2 system but most television is consumed through IPTV and over-the-top internet services. The privately owned Stöð 2, owned by Sýn, began as Iceland's second largest broadcaster in 1986. Síminn also operates television channels and broadcasting services.
