= Postal, telegraph and telephone service =

Government agency of communications

A postal, telegraph, and telephone service (PTT) is a government agency responsible for postal mail, telegraph, and telephone services. Such monopolies existed in many countries, though not in North America, post-war Japan or Spain. Many PTTs have been partially or completely privatised in recent years, though a few, such as Posta ve Telgraf Teşkilatı of Turkey, Myanma Posts and Telecommunications of Myanmar and Tusass of Greenland, continue to remain wholly government-owned. In many of said privatisations, the privatised corporation was completely renamed, such as KPN in the Netherlands, Orange in France (+ Orange Polska in Poland), BT Group in the United Kingdom, Eir in the Republic of Ireland, Swisscom in Switzerland, Telstra in Australia, Spark in New Zealand, Proximus Group in Belgium, A1 Telekom Austria Group in Austria, TDC Group in Denmark, Telia Company in Sweden and Finland, Telenor in Norway, Chunghwa Telecom in Taiwan and Singtel in Singapore; whereas in others, the name of the privatised corporation has been only slightly modified, such as Telkom Indonesia in Indonesia, Telekom Malaysia in Malaysia, Kosovo Telecom in Kosovo, Deutsche Telekom in Germany (+ Hrvatski Telekom in Croatia and Telekom Romania Mobile in Romania), Altice Portugal in Portugal, KT in South Korea, Post Luxembourg in Luxembourg and, Síminn in Iceland.

== Monopoly service ==
In countries that had a PTT unit of government, typically the vast majority of forms of distribution of information fell under the auspices of the PTT, whether that be the delivery of printed publications and individual letters in the postal mail, the transmission of telephonic audio, or the transmission of telegraphic on-off signals, and in some countries, the broadcast of one-way (audio) radio and (audio-video) television signals. In many countries with a current or former PTT, the PTT was also responsible for the manufacture and standardisation of telephone equipment. Often the presence of a single PTT in a country implied a single monolithic approach to the distribution of information in that country, which as an advantage permitted efficient deployment of a single national standard for each topic instead of ongoing debate about competing ideas, but which as a disadvantage typically stifled alternative ideas from emerging once a legacy implementation had been widely deployed.

== Countries without a PTT ==
In North America, instead of a PTT there was the private monopoly Bell System (for the US)/Bell Canada (dominant ILEC in Ontario, Quebec and (historically) parts of what is now Nunavut; competes with other fixed-line carriers in the rest of Canada) responsible for telecommunications and a separate federally run US Postal Service/Canada Post for mail delivery. The United States also has several private postal companies, including UPS and FedEx. Post-war Japan also had a rather similar structure as North America with the partially-state-owned Nippon Telegraph and Telephone (NTT; privatized in 1985 but the government still have a controlling stake) having a monopoly on fixed-line telecoms, with the separate government-run but publicly traded Japan Post responsible for mail delivery (prior to World War II, Japan had a postal, telegraph and telephone service under the Ministry of Communications); as did Spain with Compañía Telefónica Nacional de España (CTNE; privatized in 1997) having a monopoly on fixed-line telecoms, with the separate state-owned Correos de España responsible for mail delivery.

== Mixed service ==
Portugal, until 1968, had a mixture, with a private telecom operator in Lisbon and Porto (named APT – Anglo-Portuguese Telephone Company) another private company in charge of connections with and between colonies and with the rest of the world (CPRM – Companhia Portuguesa de Rádio Marconi) and Correios, Telefones e Telégrafos, a public company, as the PTT agency and owner of the telephone system in the rest of the country (including the former colonies); that year, APT was nationalised and became Telefones de Lisboa e Porto (TLP). CTT still controls postal services in Portugal, while Telecom Portugal was spun out in 1992 and later merged into Portugal Telecom in 1994 (with CPRM becoming a subsidiary and later being absorbed in 2002); it is privatised and subject to competition.

== See also ==
- European Conference of Postal and Telecommunications Administrations
