= Farice =

Icelandic internet service provider

Farice ehf
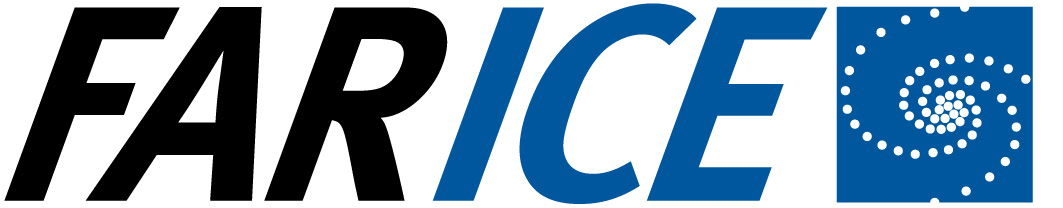
- Company type: Public–private partnership
- Industry: Telecommunications
- Founded: Reykjavík, Iceland (November 2002)
- Headquarters: Reykjavík, Iceland
- Area served: Iceland
- Services: Internet service provider
- Website: farice.is

Farice is a telecommunications service provider operating in Iceland. The company offers Internet transit, MPLS VPN, DWDM and SDH services and offers only international connectivity. The company operates mainly as a carrier for service providers, data center customers and data center service providers.

== History ==
Farice was founded in November 2002 and is the main provider of International connectivity in and out of Iceland. Farice is owned by the Arion Bank, Landsvirkjun the national power company of Iceland and the Icelandic state. The company also serves the Faroe Islands with international capacity and extends the Greenland Connect submarine cable for Tele Greenland to Europe.

Farice ehf owns two submarine cables, named DANICE and FARICE-1 and has points-of-presence in Reykjavík, Hafnarfjörður and Keflavík Airport in Iceland and abroad in the following main places: Telecity II Amsterdam, Telehouse East & West London, Interxion Copenhagen and Klingran Torshavn.

The submarine capacity available is a multiple of terabits per second.
