= List of shipwrecks in February 1849 =

The list of shipwrecks in February 1849 includes ships sunk, foundered, wrecked, grounded, or otherwise lost during February 1849.

== 1 February ==
List of shipwrecks: 1 February 1849
Ship	State	Description
Fairfield	United Kingdom	The ship was driven ashore at Crosby, Lancashire. She was on a voyage from Alexandria, Egypt to Liverpool, Lancashire. She was refloated and taken in to Liverpool in a leaky condition.
George	United Kingdom	The brigantine was wrecked on the Anegada Reef. Her crew were rescued.
Hampden	United States	The ship was driven ashore at Crosby.
Jeune Victoire	France	The ship was driven ashore and wrecked in the Baie des Trépassés. Her crew were rescued. She was on a voyage from Argenton to Pont-l'Abbé, Finistère.
Margaret	United Kingdom	The ship struck rocks and sank in Bardsey Sound. She was on a voyage from Newport, Monmouthshire to Liverpool.
Orestes	United Kingdom	The ship was wrecked at Benin City, Gold Coast. Her crew were rescued. She was on a voyage from Swansea, Glamorgan to Fernando Po.

== 2 February ==
List of shipwrecks: 2 February 1849
Ship	State	Description
British Queen	United Kingdom	The ship sprang a leak and was abandoned in the Mediterranean Sea off Sardinia. Her crew were rescued by Margaret and John (United Kingdom). British Queen was on a voyage from Palermo, Sicily to Liverpool, Lancashire.
Diana	Duchy of Holstein	The ship was damaged by an onboard explosion at Cardiff, Glamorgan. She was on a voyage from Cardiff to Bremerhaven.
Eliza	United Kingdom	The brig ran aground on the Barber Sand, in the North Sea off the coast of Norfolk. She was on a voyage from Sunderland, County Durham to London. She was refloated the next day and taken in to Great Yarmouth, Norfolk.
Elizabeth	United Kingdom	The ship ran aground on the Burbo Bank, in Liverpool Bay. She was on a voyage from New Orleans, Louisiana, United States to Liverpool. She was refloated and taken in to Liverpool.

== 3 February ==
List of shipwrecks: 3 February 1849
Ship	State	Description
Ida	(United Kingdom of Great Britain and Ireland) British North America	The brig was driven ashore at Absecon, New Jersey, United States.
Lady Constable	United Kingdom	The ship ran aground at Waterford, She was on a voyage from Constantinople, Ottoman Empire to Waterford. She was refloated and taken in to port.
Pioneer	United Kingdom	The ship foundered in the Atlantic Ocean. All on board were rescued. She was on a voyage from Bristol, Gloucestershire to New Orleans, Louisiana, United States.
Sarah	United Kingdom	The ship was in collision with Hero and foundered in the North Sea. Her crew were rescued. She was on a voyage from Sunderland, County Durham to Ipswich, Suffolk.

== 4 February ==
List of shipwrecks: 4 February 1849
Ship	State	Description
Gordon	United Kingdom	The sloop struck a sunken rock in Liverpool Bay and foundered. Her crew were rescued. She was on a voyage from Liverpool, Lancashire to Bangor.
James Clephin	(United Kingdom of Great Britain and Ireland) British North America	The ship was wrecked near the mouth of the Ozama River. She was on a voyage from Santo Domingo, Dominican Republic to Liverpool.
Jane	United Kingdom	The brig was wrecked on the English Bank, in the River Plate. She was on a voyage from Liverpool to Rio de Janeiro, Brazil.
Rattler	United Kingdom	The screw steamer was driven ashore at Atherfield, Isle of Wight. She was on a voyage from Ireland to London. She was refloated and taken in to St. Helen's, Isle of Wight.

== 5 February ==
List of shipwrecks: 5 February 1849
Ship	State	Description
Ariel	United Kingdom	The ship was driven ashore and wrecked at Watchman's Cape, Falkland Islands. She was on a voyage from Rio de Janeiro, Brazil to the Falkland Islands.
Bertrand	United States	The ship was beached at Belfast, County Down, United Kingdom, it being suspected her cargo was on fire. She was on a voyage from Boston, Massachusetts to Liverpool, Lancashire, United Kingdom. She was refloated on 8 February.

== 6 February ==
List of shipwrecks: 6 February 1849
Ship	State	Description
Frances	(United Kingdom of Great Britain and Ireland) British North America	The schooner was driven ashore and damaged on Peter Island, Nova Scotia. She was on a voyage from New Edinburgh, Nova Scotia to the West Indies. She was refloated and taken in to the Grand Passage.
Kitty	(United Kingdom of Great Britain and Ireland) Gibraltar	The schooner was wrecked in the Buceo whilst going to the assistance of Jane (United Kingdom).
Lannen	United Kingdom	The ship struck a rock in Lough Foyle and was damaged. She was on a voyage from Catania, Sicily to Londonderry.

== 7 February ==
List of shipwrecks: 7 February 1849
Ship	State	Description
Patriot	United Kingdom	The ship was driven ashore at Fisher's Nose. She was on a voyage from Plymouth, Devon to Limerick.
Pryde	United Kingdom	The ship ran aground on the Salthouse Bank, in the Irish Sea off the coast of Lancashire. She was on a voyage from Londonderry to Preston, Lancashire. She was refloated and taken in to Lytham St. Annes, Lancashire.

== 8 February ==
List of shipwrecks: 8 February 1849
Ship	State	Description
Clinton	United Kingdom	The ship ran aground on the Burbo Bank, in Liverpool Bay. She was on a voyage from Liverpool, Lancashire to Mobile, Alabama, United States. She was refloated and put back to Liverpool in a leaky condition.
Futty Rahiman	India	The ship was destroyed by fire.

== 9 February ==
List of shipwrecks: 9 February 1849
Ship	State	Description
Bertrand	United States	The ship was destroyed by fire at Carrickfergus, County Antrim, United Kingdom.
Caroline	United Kingdom	The ship foundered in the Mediterranean Sea. She was on a voyage from Constantinople, Ottoman Empire to Cork or Falmouth, Cornwall.
Elizabeth and Henry	United Kingdom	The barque was wrecked on a coral reef off the Loochoo Islands. Some of her crew were rescued the two American whalers. The remainder were rescued in March by the brig HMS Mariner (Royal Navy).
Ellen	(United Kingdom of Great Britain and Ireland) New South Wales	The cutter was wrecked at the Sydney Heads with the loss of four of the five people on board.
Harriet	United Kingdom	The brig was driven ashore at Punta Carretas, Uruguay. She was on a voyage from Buenos Aires, Argentina to a British port She was refloated and taken in to Montevideo, Uruguay in a leaky condition.
Hope; Lady Ann	United Kingdom	The schooners were in collision in the North Sea off the coast of Lincolnshire. Hope foundered with the loss of all but one of the eight people on board. She was on a voyage from Littlehampton, Sussex to Leith, Lothian; Lady Ann was severely damaged. She was towed in to Bridlington, Yorkshire by the brig Tino (United Kingdom). She was on a voyage from Middlesbrough, Yorkshire to London.
Kate Kearney	United States	The ship was driven ashore at Chatham, Massachusetts and was abandoned by her crew. She was on a voyage from New York to Cork, United Kingdom. She subsequently became a wreck.
Maria, or Mary Maria	United Kingdom	The sloop ran aground south east of Læsø, Denmark. She was on a voyage from Newcastle upon Tyne, Northumberland to Thisted, Denmark.
Perseverance	United Kingdom	The smack struck a sunken wreck and foundered at the mouth of the Humber. She was on a voyage from Scarborough, Yorkshire to Hull, Yorkshire. She was rez
Sarah	United Kingdom	The ship was driven ashore and damaged at Saint-Jean-d'Acre, Ottoman Empire. She was later refloated and repaired.

== 10 February ==
List of shipwrecks: 10 February 1849
Ship	State	Description
Bee	United Kingdom	The ship departed from Porthcawl, Glamorgan for Genoa, Kingdom of Sardinia. No further trace, presumed foundered with the loss of all hands.
Doughty	United Kingdom	The ship was wrecked on the Wittsand, in the North Sea. Her crew were rescued by Chevy Chase (United Kingdom). She was on a voyage from Newcastle upon Tyne, Northumberland to Hamburg.
Gute Hoffnung	Danzig	The ship was driven ashore near Stolpmünde. She was on a voyage from Sunderland, County Durham, United Kingdom to Danzig.
Idriano	Austrian Empire	The brig was wrecked on a shoal east of Tripoli, Ottoman Tripolitania. She was on a voyage from Constantinople, Ottoman Empire to an English port.
Jane	United Kingdom	The brig was driven ashore at Toward Point, Argyllshire. She was refloated on 27 February and towed in to Greenock, Renfrewshire for repairs.
Ottilie	Stettin	The ship was wrecked on rocks near Arisaig, Inverness-shire. United Kingdom. She was on a voyage from Dublin to Newcastle upon Tyne.
Perth	United Kingdom	The sloop ran aground south of Inchkeith and sank. Her crew survived. She was on a voyage from Leith, Lothian to Inverkeithing, Fife.
Star	United Kingdom	The schooner was abandoned off Lindisfarne, Northumberland. Her crew were rescued by Marianne (United Kingdom). Star was on a voyage from Charlestown, Cornwall to Berwick upon Tweed, Northumberland. Presumed subsequently foundered.

== 11 February ==
List of shipwrecks: 11 February 1849
Ship	State	Description
Mary	United Kingdom	The schooner was wrecked on Taylor's Bank, in Liverpool Bay. She was on a voyage from Workington, Cumberland to Liverpool, Lancashire or vice versa.
Mary and Jane	United Kingdom	The ship struck rocks off Kyleakin, Isle of Skye, Outer Hebrides and was damaged. She was on a voyage from Liverpool to Aberdeen. She was refloated and put in to Isleornsay.

== 12 February ==
List of shipwrecks: 12 February 1849
Ship	State	Description
Abeona	United Kingdom	The ship was driven ashore at King's Lynn, Norfolk. She was refloated the next day.
Findhorn	United Kingdom	The ship was driven ashore in Widewall Bay.
Industrious Helen	United Kingdom	The sloop was abandoned in the North Sea 30 nautical miles (56 km) north east of the Isle of May. Her crew were rescued by Countess of Leven and Melville (United Kingdom). Industrious Helen was on a voyage from Newcastle upon Tyne, Northumberland to Arbroath, Forfarshire. She was towed in to Montrose, Forfarshire in a derelict condition by Eagle (United Kingdom).
Stonehouse	United Kingdom	The schooner ran aground on the Tongue Sand, in the North Sea off the coast of Kent. She was on a voyage from London to Plymouth, Devon
Surat	India	The steamship ran aground on a reef 6 nautical miles (11 km) north west of "Puttun Samnaut". All on board were rescued. She was on a voyage from Bombay to Kurrachee. Surat was refloated on 17 March and towed in to Bombay.
Vigilant	United Kingdom	The ship was driven ashore at King's Lynn. She was refloated the next day.

== 13 February ==
List of shipwrecks: 13 February 1849
Ship	State	Description
Ariel	United Kingdom	The ship was driven ashore on Langeoog, Kingdom of Hanover. She was on a voyage from Rio de Janeiro, Brazil to Bremen.
Duke of Cornwall	United Kingdom	The paddle steamer ran aground off the Isle of Wight. She was on a voyage from Dublin to London. She was refloated and resumed her voyage.
Sarah	United Kingdom	The ship departed from Newcastle upon Tyne, Northumberland for Plymouth, Devon. Presumed subsequently foundered in the English Channel; a writing desk and papers from the vessel were discovered off The Needles, Isle of Wight in mid-March.

== 14 February ==
List of shipwrecks: 14 February 1849
Ship	State	Description
Alfred	United Kingdom	The brig was in collision with the brig Argus and foundered in the English Channel off Beachy Head, Sussex. Her crew were rescued. She was on a voyage from Portsmouth, Hampshire to Sunderland, County Durham.
Ardincaple	France	The ship ran aground on the Goodwin Sands, Kent, United Kingdom. She was on a voyage from Caen, Calvados to Newcastle upon Tyne, Northumberland, United Kingdom. She was refloated and resumed her voyage.
Lord Sandon	United Kingdom	The ship was destroyed by fire at Kinsale, County Cork.
Rover	United Kingdom	The ship was wrecked on a reef south of Green Island. She was on a voyage from Alexandria, Egypt to Cork or Falmouth, Cornwall.
Sarah and Ann	United Kingdom	The ship was in collision with Maranham (United Kingdom) and foundered in the Irish Sea off Holyhead, Anglesey with the loss of a crew member. Survivors were rescued by Maranham. Sarah and Ann was on a voyage from Liverpool, Lancashire to Naples, Kingdom of the Two Sicilies.

== 15 February ==
List of shipwrecks: 15 February 1849
Ship	State	Description
Amalia	Prussia	The ship ran aground off Birkenhead, Cheshire, United Kingdom. She was on a voyage from Birkenhead to Memel.
Amelia	United Kingdom	The ship ran aground off Beachy Head, Sussex. She was on a voyage from Liverpool, Lancashire to Memel, Prussia.
Benoni	United Kingdom	The ship was wrecked on Læsø, Denmark. Her crew were rescued. She was on a voyage from Sunderland, County Durham to Flensburg, Duchy of Holstein.
Cookson	United Kingdom	The ship ran aground and sank in the Formby Channel. Her crew were rescued by the Liverpool Lifeboat. She was on a voyage from Liverpool to Livorno, Grand Duchy of Tuscany.
Guess	United Kingdom	The brig ran aground on the Koolungsoo Rocks, off Amoy, China. She had become a wreck by 24 March.
Jane Blain	United Kingdom	The ship was abandoned in the Atlantic Ocean. Her crew were rescued. She was on a voyage from Norfolk, Virginia to Sligo.
Neptune	United Kingdom	The steamship ran aground at Bremerhaven.
Scamander	United Kingdom	The ship was wrecked on the coast of New Caledonia with the loss of 27 of her 31 crew.
11 April	Norway	The ship was driven ashore and wrecked 2 nautical miles (3.7 km) south of Bergen. She was on a voyage from Bergen to a Mediterranean port.

== 16 February ==
List of shipwrecks: 16 February 1849
Ship	State	Description
Adele	Prussia	The ship was wrecked off "Kyrkasund", Sweden. She was on a voyage from Hull, Yorkshire, United Kingdom to Memel.
America	United States	The ship was severely damaged by ice at New York. She was on a voyage from New York to Pensacola, Florida.
Trim	United Kingdom	The sloop was driven ashore at Ayr. She was on a voyage from Newry, County Antrim to Ayr.

== 17 February ==
List of shipwrecks: 17 February 1849
Ship	State	Description
Countess of Lonsdale	United Kingdom	The tug was damaged by fire at Liverpool, Lancashire.
Mazeppa	(United Kingdom of Great Britain and Ireland) British North America	The ship was driven ashore by ice at Halifax, Nova Scotia. Her crew were rescued. She was on a voyage from Boston, Massachusetts, United States to Halifax. She was refloated on 23 February.
Ocean	United Kingdom	The ship sprang a leak and was beached north of Cresswell, Northumberland. Her crew were rescued. She was on a voyage from South Shields, County Durham to the Kennet Pans.
Rosalie	Sweden	The brig was wrecked on Skagen, Denmark with the loss of all hands. She was on a voyage from Palma, Mallorca, Spain to Gothenburg.

== 18 February ==
List of shipwrecks: 18 February 1849
Ship	State	Description
Favourite	(United Kingdom of Great Britain and Ireland) British North America	The ship was driven ashore at Pennant Point, Nova Scotia. Her crew were rescued. She was on a voyage from Halifax, Nova Scotia to New York City, United States. She subsequently became a wreck.
Ocean	United Kingdom	The ship sprang a leak and was beached at Cresswell, Northumberland. Her crew were rescued. She was on a voyage from Newcastle upon Tyne, Northumberland to Kincardine, Fife.
Oscar	United States	The brig was wrecked at Scituate, Massachusetts.
Toronto	(United Kingdom of Great Britain and Ireland) British North America	The ship was driven ashore on Pennant Point, Nova Scotia. She was on a voyage from Halifax to New York.

== 19 February ==
List of shipwrecks: 19 February 1849
Ship	State	Description
Admiral Duncan	United Kingdom	The ship was driven ashore and severely damaged at Berwick upon Tweed, Northumberland.
Cæsar	United Kingdom	The ship ran aground on the Barber Sand, in the North Sea off the coast of Norfolk. She was refloated.
Corradino	Kingdom of the Two Sicilies	The ship was wrecked on the Barber Sand. She was on a voyage from Newcastle upon Tyne, Northumberland to Naples, Kingdom of the Two Sicilies.
Dispatch	United Kingdom	The ship was driven ashore at Berwick upon Tweed.
Hearts of Oak	United Kingdom	The ship was in collision with a brig and was abandoned off Robin Hoods Bay, Yorkshire. Her crew were rescued by Habnab ( (United Kingdom of Great Britain and Ireland) Jersey). Hearts of Oak was on a voyage from Stockton-on-Tees, County Durham to Wainfleet, Lincolnshire.
Lord Charles Spencer	United Kingdom	The ship was driven ashore and wrecked at Shoreham-by-Sea, Sussex. She was on a voyage from London to Guernsey, Channel Islands.
Mary and Jane	United Kingdom	The schooner caught fire at Mutford, Suffolk and was scuttled. Her crew were rescued. She was on a voyage from Beccles, Suffolk to Newcastle upon Tyne, Northumberland. She was a total loss.
Mary Ann	United Kingdom	The ship was driven ashore at Lindisfarne, Northumberland.
Rideout	United Kingdom	The ship was wrecked on the Knechtsand, in the North Sea. Her crew were rescued. She was on a voyage from London to Bremen.
Robert and James	United Kingdom	The ship ran aground off the coast of Suffolk. She was on a voyage from London to South Shields, County Durham. She was refloated and resumed her voyage.
Tay and Tees Packet	United Kingdom	The ship ran aground on the Burbo Bank, in Liverpool Bay. She was on a voyage from Liverpool, Lancashire to Rotterdam, South Holland, Netherlands. She was refloated and put back to Liverpool.

== 20 February ==
List of shipwrecks: 20 February 1849
Ship	State	Description
Amaranth	United Kingdom	The ship was driven ashore near Halmstad, Sweden. Her crew were rescued. She was on a voyage from Sunderland, County Durham to Helsingør, Denmark. She was refloated on 7 April and taken in to Halstad.
Ant	United Kingdom	The Humber Keel was wrecked in the Farne Islands, Northumberland.
Ceres	United Kingdom	The ship was wrecked on the Minquiers, Channel Islands. Her crew were rescued. She was on a voyage from Cardiff, Glamorgan to Newfoundland, British North America.
Dorothy	United Kingdom	The ship foundered in the North Sea off the Farne Islands, Northumberland. Her crew were rescued. She was on a voyage from Newcastle upon Tyne, Northumberland to Banff, Aberdeenshire.
Mariner	Grand Duchy of Mecklenburg-Schwerin	The ship was in collision with Fama (United Kingdom) and sank at the entrance to the Dardanelles.
Paul	Stettin	The schooner was lost off "Ruberg", Denmark. She was on a voyage from Newcastle upon Tyne to Stettin.
Shamrock	United Kingdom	The ship was driven ashore in Lough Foyle. She was on a voyage from Liverpool, Lancashire to the Rio Grande. She was refloated.

== 21 February ==
List of shipwrecks: 21 February 1849
Ship	State	Description
Claudine	United Kingdom	The ship was wrecked at Cape Agulhas, Cape Colony. All on board were rescued. She was on a voyage from Madras, India to London.
Edward	Flag unknown	The derelict ship was driven ashore and wrecked at "Krage", Denmark.
Gabrielle	France	The ship ran aground on the Holm Sand, in the North Sea off the coast of Suffolk, United Kingdom and was abandoned. She was towed in to Lowestoft, Suffolk in a derelict condition the next day.
Isabella	United Kingdom	The ship was wrecked on the Steel Sand, in the Elbe. Her crew were rescued. She was on a voyage from Stockton-on-Tees, County Durham to Hamburg.
Juno	Hamburg	The ship was driven ashore on Düne, Heligoland. Her crew were rescued. She was on a voyage from Hartlepool, County Durham, United Kingdom to Hamburg.
Mary and Jane	United Kingdom	The schooner was driven ashore at Crosby Point, Lancashire. She was on a voyage from Cork to Liverpool, Lancashire.
Newcastle	United Kingdom	The ship was driven ashore and wrecked at Whitby, Yorkshire. Her crew were rescued. She was on a voyage from Whitby to London.
Onderneming	Netherlands	The ship was wrecked in the Vlie. Her crew were rescued.
Oriental	United Kingdom	The ship was driven ashore on Flynn's Knoll. She was on a voyage from Liverpool to New York, United States. She was refloated and taken in to New York.
Robinson	United Kingdom	The brig struck the pier, was driven ashore and wrecked at Whitby, Yorkshire.
Union	(United Kingdom of Great Britain and Ireland) Guernsey	The ship ran aground on the Cross Sand, in the North Sea off the coast of Norfolk. She was refloated and assisted in to Great Yarmouth Norfolk.

== 22 February ==
List of shipwrecks: 22 February 1849
Ship	State	Description
British Oak	United Kingdom	The ship struck the Brimstone, in the Farne Islands, Northumberland and foundered. Her crew were rescued. She was on a voyage from Port Dundas, Renfrewshire to London.
Gee	United Kingdom	The ship was lost near Tønning, Duchy of Holstein. Her crew were rescued. She was on a voyage from Hull, Yorkshire to Hamburg.
Isabella	United Kingdom	The ship was wrecked on the Steilsand, in the North Sea. She was on a voyage from Stockton on Tees, County Durham to Hamburg.
Louis Charles	United Kingdom	The ship was driven ashore by ice in the Danube upstream of Galaţi, Ottoman Empire.
May	United Kingdom	The ship was lost off Benin City, Dahomey. Her crew were rescued She was on a voyage from Liverpool, Lancashire to the Cameroons.
Spring	United Kingdom	The ship was lost near Tønning. Her crew were rescued. She was on a voyage from Inverkeithing, Fife to Rendsburg, Duchy of Holstein.

== 23 February ==
List of shipwrecks: 23 February 1849
Ship	State	Description
Emma Maria	Hamburg	The ship was abandoned off the mouth of the Weser with the loss of a crew member. Survivors were rescued by the steamship Rob Roy (United Kingdom). Emma Maria was on a voyage from Newcastle upon Tyne, Northumberland, United Kingdom to Hamburg. She was subsequently towed in to Hamburg by the steamship Elbe (Hamburg).
Jacobine	Denmark	The ship was driven ashore near Thisted. She was on a voyage from Hartlepool, County Durham, United Kingdom to Struer.
Mary Ann	United Kingdom	The ship struck a sunken rock 12 nautical miles (22 km) south of Bridlington, Yorkshire and was damaged. She was on a voyage from Great Yarmouth, Norfolk to Newcastle upon Tyne. She put in to Bridlington in a leaky condition.
Sainte Marie	France	The fishing boat was in collision with Diana (United Kingdom) and sank in the English Channel off Dungeness, Kent, United Kingdom. She was refloated on 27 February and taken in to Folkestone, Kent.

== 24 February ==
List of shipwrecks: 24 February 1849
Ship	State	Description
Princess Royal	United Kingdom	The barque was wrecked at Point Lonsdale, New South Wales. Her crew were rescued. She was on a voyage from Hong Kong to Sydney, New South Wales.
Rideout	United States	The ship was wrecked on the Knech Sand, in the North Sea. Her crew were rescued. She was on a voyage from London, United Kingdom to Bremen.
Sarah	United Kingdom	The ship was run into by Syren (United Kingdom) and sank at Dublin. She was refloated.
William and Henry	United Kingdom	The ship departed from Malta for Cork. No further trace, presumed foundered with the loss of all hands.

== 25 February ==
List of shipwrecks: 25 February 1849
Ship	State	Description
Duc de Brabant	Netherlands	The ship was driven ashore at the Morro Castle, Havana, Cuba. She was later refloated.
Harriet Emma	United Kingdom	The ship was driven ashore near Mollösund, Sweden. She was on a voyage from Wisbech, Cambridgeshire to a Baltic port. She was refloated and taken in to Marstrand, Sweden.
Industry	United Kingdom	The schooner ran aground off Cairn Ryan, Wigtownshire. She was on a voyage from Galway to Liverpool, Lancashire.
Kapstad	Flag unknown	The ship was driven ashore and severely damaged in Sutton Pool. She was refloated.
Minx	United Kingdom	The ship ran aground on the Longsand, in the North Sea off the coast of Essex. She was on a voyage from Newcastle upon Tyne, Northumberland to Cádiz, Spain. She was refloated and put in to Harwich, Essex.
Salus	United Kingdom	The ship was driven ashore and severely damaged on East Mouse, Anglesey. Her crew survived. She was on a voyage from Runcorn, Cheshire to Amlwch, Anglesey.

== 26 February ==
List of shipwrecks: 26 February 1849
Ship	State	Description
Kate	United Kingdom	The schooner departed from Falmouth, Cornwall for Nantes, Loire-Inférieure, France. No further trace, presumed foundered with the loss of all hands.
Neptune	France	The lugger was wrecked at the mouth of the Loire. She was on a voyage from Bordeaux, Gironde to Rouen, Seine-Inférieure.
William Warren	United Kingdom	The ship sank in Conception Bay. Her crew were rescued.

== 27 February ==
List of shipwrecks: 27 February 1849
Ship	State	Description
Blue Vein	United Kingdom	The smack sprang a leak and was abandoned in the Irish Sea. Her crew were rescued by the brig Pleiades (United Kingdom). Blue Vein was on a voyage from Carmarthen to the Clyde.
Emma	United Kingdom	The ship sank at Waterford. Her crew were rescued. She was on a voyage from Port Talbot, Glamorgan to Waterford.
Emulation	United Kingdom	The ship was abandoned in the Irish Sea 20 nautical miles (37 km) north north west of Cardigan Head, Cardiganshire. Her crew were rescued. She was on a voyage from Newport, Monmouthshire to Liverpool, Lancashire. Emulation came ashore near Barmouth, Caernarfonshire.
Fame, and Rob Roy	United Kingdom	The brigantine Rob Roy was in collision with the schooner Fame and was abandoned in the Irish Sea off Amlwch, Anglesey. Her crew got on board Fame, but it was discovered that she was sinking. All on board took to the boats and reached shore. Fame sank, but Rob Roy was towed in the Amlwch by the steamship Windermere (United Kingdom). Fame was on a voyage from Liverpool, Lancashire to Youghal, County Cork. Rob Roy was on a voyage from Pentewan, Cornwall to Liverpool.
Industry	United Kingdom	The ship was wrecked at Peterhead, Aberdeenshire. Her crew were rescued. She was on a voyage from London to Peterhead.
Margaret and Rachel	United Kingdom	The ship was driven ashore at Penrhyn Bay, Caernarfonshire. She was on a voyage from Liverpool to Dublin.
Ordovia	Spain	The ship was driven ashore 3 leagues (9 nautical miles (17 km)) west of Málaga. She was on a voyage from Málaga to Dénia.
Robert and Mary	United Kingdom	The sloop was driven against the pier and wrecked at West Hartlepool, County Durham with the loss of her captain. She was on a voyage from Scarborough, Yorkshire to the River Tees.

== 28 February ==
List of shipwrecks: 28 February 1849
Ship	State	Description
Antigua Planter	United Kingdom	The ship struck the pier and sank at Ramsgate, Kent. She was on a voyage from Newcastle upon Tyne, Northumberland to St. Ives, Cornwall. She was refloated on 5 March and taken in to a drydock.
Avienis	United Kingdom	The brig was wrecked at Plymouth, Devon.
Autumn	United Kingdom	The ship was driven ashore and sank near Redcar, Yorkshire. Her crew were rescued. She was on a voyage from London to Hartlepool, County Durham.
Avenger	United Kingdom	The schooner was discovered derelict in Bootle Bay and was taken in to Liverpool, Lancashire. She had been on a voyage from Glasgow, Renfrewshire to Runcorn, Cheshire.
Bess	United Kingdom	The ship ran aground on the Newcombe Sand, in the North Sea off the coast of Norfolk and sank. Her crew were rescued.
Bon Père	France	The ship was driven ashore at Ballyhalbert, County Down, United Kingdom. She was on a voyage from Glasgow to Bordeaux, Gironde.
Boyne	United Kingdom	The ship was driven ashore at Littlehampton, Sussex. She was on a voyage from Hartlepool to Littlehampton.
Breadalbane	United Kingdom	The ship was driven ashore and sank at Aldeburgh, Suffolk.
Clementina	United Kingdom	The ship was wrecked on the Maplin Sand, in the North Sea off the coast of Essex. Her crew were rescued.
Clio	United Kingdom	The ship sank in the Princess Channel. Her crew were rescued. She was on a voyage from Poole, Dorset to London.
Como	United Kingdom	The ship was wrecked on the Sow and Pigs Rocks, in the North Sea off the coast of Northumberland. Her crew were rescued.
Dyle	Netherlands	The East Indiaman, a barque, was wrecked on the Longsand, in the North Sea off the coast of Essex, United Kingdom with the loss of a crew member. Survivors were rescued by HMRC Scout ( Board of Customs). Dyle was on a voyage from Antwerp, Belgium to Havana, Cuba.
Elizabeth and Ann	United Kingdom	The ship foundered in the Atlantic Ocean 18 nautical miles (33 km) south of the Isles of Scilly. Her nine crew were rescued by the brig Cerf (France). Elizabeth Ann was on a voyage from Alexandria, Egypt to Southampton, Hampshire.
Elizabeth Ann	United Kingdom	The ship ran aground off Harwich, Essex with the loss of her pilot. She was on a voyage from Antwerp, Belgium to London. She was refloated and taken in to Harwich in a leaky condition.
Elsie and Isie	United Kingdom	The sloop was driven ashore at Whiteness Head. She was on a voyage from Macduff, Aberdeenshire to Stornoway, Isle of Lewis, Outer Hebrides.
Eppin	Netherlands	The galiot was driven ashore at Ramsgate, Kent, United Kingdom with the loss of her pilot. She was on a voyage from Amsterdam, North Holland to Liverpool. She was refloated the next day and taken in to Ramsgate.
Floridian	United States	The barque was wrecked on the Longsand with the loss of 171 of the 175 people on board. Survivors were rescued by HMRC Peterel ( Board of Customs). Floridian was on a voyage from Antwerp to New York.
George	United Kingdom	The sloop was driven ashore and wrecked at Seaham, County Durham.
Gode Haab	Norway	The ship was driven ashore near Frederikshavn, Denmark.
Haaret	Norway	The ship was lost off Lillesand. Her crew were rescued.
Hebe	United Kingdom	The ship ran aground off Great Yarmouth, Norfolk. She was on a voyage from Montrose, Forfarshire to Ipswich, Suffolk. She was refloated and taken in to Great Yarmouth.
Irene	United Kingdom	The ship was driven ashore north of Maryport, Cumberland.
Integrity	United Kingdom	The sloop foundered. All on board were rescued. She was on a voyage from Antwerp, Belgium to London.
Isabella, and Sarah	United Kingdom	The brigs were in collision off Tynemouth Castle, Northumberland. Isabella was severely damaged, Susan sank. Her ten crew were rescued.
Jane and Mary	United Kingdom	The sloop foundered. Her crew were rescued by the sloop Integrity (United Kingdom). Jane and Mary was on a voyage from Antwerp to London.
Jeune Flore	France	The ship was wrecked at Cherbourg, Seine-Inférieure. She was on a voyage from Sunderland, County Durham, United Kingdom to Bordeaux, Gironde.
Little	United Kingdom	The ship was driven ashore north of Maryport.
Lively	United Kingdom	The ship was driven ashore near Greencastle, County Antrim. She was on a voyage from Bangor to Dundalk, County Louth. She was refloated on 2 March and towed in to Warrenpoint, County Antrim.
Louise	Belgium	The ship was wrecked on the Kentish Knock. Her crew were rescued. She was on a voyage from Antwerp to Tralee, County Kerry, United Kingdom.
Marsden	United Kingdom	The ship ran aground on the Barnard Sand, in the North Sea off the coast of Norfolk. She was on a voyage from Antwerp, Belgium to London. She was refloated and taken in to Great Yarmouth, Norfolk.
Plymouth	United Kingdom	The ship was in collision with Santa Martha (flag unknown) and was abandoned off the Tuskar Rock. Her crew survived. Plymouth was on a voyage from Liverpool to Halifax, Nova Scotia, British North America. She foundered on 1 March.
Sarah	United Kingdom	The ship sank at Sharpness, Gloucestershire.
St. Jorgen	Norway	The ship was driven ashore at Grimstad. Her crew were rescued. She was on a voyage from Porsgrund to Guernsey, Channel Islands. She was refloated and taken in to Grimstadt in a waterlogged condition.
Southampton	United Kingdom	The brig was wrecked on the Arklow Bank, in the Irish Sea off the coast of County Wicklow with the loss of three of her crew. Survivors were rescued by Tyro (United Kingdom). Southampton was on a voyage from Glasgow, Renfrewshire to Naples, Kingdom of the Two Sicilies.
Triton	United Kingdom	The ship was driven ashore north of Maryport. She was on a voyage from Dublin to Maryport. She was refloated on 24 March and taken in to Maryport.
Watt	United Kingdom	The tug was driven ashore north of Maryport.
W. M.	United Kingdom	The ship ran aground on the Cork Sand, in the North Sea off the coast of Essex and was damaged. Her crew were rescued. She was on a voyage from Antwerp, Belgium to Newhaven, Sussex. She was refloated and taken in to Harwich, Essex.

== Unknown date ==
List of shipwrecks: Unknown date in February 1849
Ship	State	Description
Abby Pratt	United States	The ship was in collision with Cobden (United States) and foundered in the Atlantic Ocean.
Cleopatra	United Kingdom	The ship foundered in the Atlantic Ocean before 22 February. Her stern washed up on the Isle of Mull.
Dankbar	Prussia	The ship was driven ashore whilst on a voyage from Königsberg to Hull, Yorkshire, United Kingdom. She was refloated and put in to Christiansand, Norway in a leaky condition, arriving on 13 February.
Desdemona	United States	The ship was driven ashore and damaged on Hart Island, New York. She was on a voyage from New York to Saint John, New Brunswick, British North America. She was refloated and taken in to New York.
Dew Drop	(United Kingdom of Great Britain and Ireland) New South Wales	The ship was wrecked at Port Albert before 10 February.
Dos Hermanos	Spain	The brig was abandoned in the Atlantic Ocean south of the Azores before 10 February.
Hart	(United Kingdom of Great Britain and Ireland) Isle of Man	The schooner was driven ashore at Laxey. She was later refloated and taken in to Douglas.
Helena Sophia	Russia	The ship departed from Leith, Lothian, United Kingdom. She subsequently ran aground on the Goodwin Sands, Kent but was refloated. No further trace, presumed foundered with the loss of all hands
Hero	United Kingdom	The ship was destroyed by fire at Geelong, Victoria.
Loharee	United Kingdom	The barque capsized in the River Thames at Rotherhithe, Surrey in late February. She had been refloated and beached by 2 March.
Lord Collingwood	United Kingdom	The barque was abandoned in the Atlantic Ocean before 28 February.
Maggie	United Kingdom	The ship was driven ashore in the Swan River before 8 February. She was later refloated.
Maid of the Mill	United Kingdom	The ship was driven ashore on Inch Island, County Donegal. She was on a voyage from the Clyde to Rio de Janeiro, Brazil. She was refloated on 22 February.
Margaret	United Kingdom	The ship foundered off the Île de Ré, Charente-Maritime, France before 20 February.
Matthew Harrison	(United Kingdom of Great Britain and Ireland) British North America	The brig was abandoned in the Atlantic Ocean before 6 February.
Merchant	United States	The schooner was abandoned in the Atlantic Ocean before 13 February.
Minerva	United Kingdom	The brigantine was wrecked on Balambangan Island. Her six crew survived. They took to a boat and were rescued 13 days later by HMS Maeander (Royal Navy). The wreck was burnt by the local inhabitants.
Panther	United Kingdom	The ship foundered before 4 February. Her crew were rescued.
Pericle	Russia	The brig was wrecked at Aboukir, Egypt Eyalet. She was on a voyage from Trieste to Alexandria, Egypt Eyalet.
Quatre Frères	France	The ship was wrecked off Boulogne, Pas-de-Calais. She was on a voyage from Dunkirk, Nord to Nantes, Loire-Inférieure.
Rapid	Sweden	The ship was wrecked on the Boccas Keys. Her crew were rescued on 23 February by Cynthia (United Kingdom). Rapia was on a voyage from Bahia, Brazil to Hamburg.
Teazer	(United Kingdom of Great Britain and Ireland) South Australia	The ship was driven ashore at Emu Bay, Van Diemen's Land. Her crew were rescued.
