= Reykjavik Internet Exchange =

Internet Exchange Point in Reykjavík, Iceland

- Full name: Reykjavik Internet Exchange
- Abbreviation: RIX
- Founded: 1999
- Location: Reykjavík, Iceland
- Website: https://www.rix.is
- Members: 30 as of June 2024
- Ports: 41 as of April 2022
- Peak: 53.3 Gb/s in March 2021
- Daily (avg.): 23.8 Gb/s as of June 2024

Reykjavik Internet Exchange (RIX) is an internet exchange point located in Reykjavík, Iceland, founded in 1999. It is operated by ISNIC, the same organisation that oversees the registration of Iceland's ccTLD, '.is'. Its primary site, RIX-TG, is located at Tæknigarður (The Centre for Technical Innovation), part of the University of Iceland. As of 2022 it operates 2 other peering sites in addition to their original site: RIX-KT (Katrínartún) and RIX-MH (Múlastöð, Ármúli 25).

It offers peering at port speeds of 1Gbps/10Gbps/100Gbps using a mix of Cisco and Juniper switch fabrics. RIX is currently Iceland's only neutral policy internet exchange and is a member of the European Internet Exchange Association, Euro-IX. As of 2022, it has 27 members and sees an average of around 11 Gb/s of traffic. All ISPs in Iceland are connected, as well as RÚV (The Icelandic public broadcaster) as well as international providers such as Cloudflare.

RIX has seen a large portion of its traffic offloaded since 2021 as four major Icelandic ISPs as well as RÚV started to peer at a new private exchange, Múli-IXP, which is operated by Sýn, hosted in a Síminn facility (Ármúli 25), which also hosts one of the RIX sites. Múli-IXP sees traffic of around 40 Gbps.

== See also ==
- Internet in Iceland
- .is
