= SHEFA-2 =

Submarine cable linking the United Kingdom and the Faroe Islands

SHEFA-2 is an undersea communication cable linking the Faroe Islands to Scotland via the Orkney & Shetland. It is named after the route on which it is being deployed (SHEtland-FAroes) and succeeds an earlier cable called SHEFA-1 on the same route.

== Construction and route ==
SHEFA-2 runs from Tórshavn in the Faroe Islands to Maywick in Shetland, then from Sandwick in Shetland onwards to Ayre of Cara in Orkney, and from Manse Bay in Orkney to Banff in Aberdeenshire, on mainland Scotland. Establishing the SHEFA-2 cable took less than two years, from the planning of the project in June 2006 until March 2008, when the cable became ready for use.

SHEFA-1 was deployed from 1971 to 1994, when CANTAT-3 (the fibre-optic submarine cable between Canada and Europe, with branches to both Iceland and the Faroe Islands), was established. It was a coaxial cable with 120 channels, carrying 120 telephone conversations at a time.

SHEFA-2 is a fibre-optic submarine cable and the capacity with the technology of 2006 is 57x10 gigabits per second. The total length of the cable is around 1000 km. SHEFA-2 includes the world's longest purely passive optical fibre cable link (390 km), entirely without amplifiers. With no submarine repeaters and no power feeds, repair and maintenance of the submarine cable is minimized. At the same time, the solution is future proof, as the end-point technology is the only item in need of change to increase the capacity.

== Disruption incidents ==
In the spring of 2013, the cable was cut at the south of Orkney. This led to major broadband disruptions throughout Shetland. Internet traffic was redirected onto the older and slower microwave links and the FARICE-1 cable.

In the summer of 2013, the cable was cut for the second time where it crosses the Moray Firth on the north-east coast of Scotland, causing more disruption to Internet connections. It is believed that fishing vessels are to blame for both cable breaks.

On 20 October 2022, the SHEFA-2 submarine cable was damaged, leaving residents in Shetland without access to the Internet and emergency services. Sources speculated this might have resulted from a fishing vessel accidentally cutting the cable. However others speculated on the possibility of sabotage by Russia. The cable had also been cut 5 days before at a different area. After the second cut, Faroese Telecom operating the cable said it is "very rare that we have two problems at the same time". It was declared to be fixed on 23 October.

The cable was disrupted twice again in 2025, in July and October respectively.

The disruption in July caused any customers of ISPs with no backup capacity to lose connectivity for 12 days, between July 26th and August 7th.

The disruption in October occurred on October 3rd 2025 and caused any customers of ISPs with no backup capacity to lose connection. As of October 10th 2025, no repair has been made.

== See also ==
- FARICE-1
