= Telephone numbers in Iceland =

- Country: Iceland
- Continent: Europe
- Regulator: The Electronic Communications Office of Iceland (ECOI)
- NSN length: 7
- Numbering plan: https://www.fjarskiptastofa.is/library?itemid=d0a59d1e-2323-4fa0-a2f1-939e1c445ab4
- Country code: +354
- International access: 00
- Long-distance: none

Telephone numbers in Iceland are seven digits long and generally written in the form xxx xxxx or xxx-xxxx and the E.123 format specifies +354 xxx xxxx from abroad since the country code is +354.

There are no area codes in this closed numbering plan and the international call prefix is 00. Numbers of mobile phones tend to begin with either 6xx xxxx, 7xx xxxx or 8xx xxxx, while landline numbers starting with 5xx xxxx (in Reykjavík) or 4xx xxxx (the countryside). Numbers starting with 3 are nine digits long, 3xx xxx xxx.

== Allocation of numbers ==
The current format of 7 digit telephone numbers was adopted on 3 June 1995, when 1 to 3 numbers (depending on region) were added to numbers to standardise on number length. At this time, the international direct dialling code became 00 (previously 90), in line with ITU recommendations. Also, the unified number for emergency services was changed to 112 on 1 October 1995. Over the years new number allocations such as new mobile networks (Sýn and NOVA), were granted prefixes.

Prefix	Number Length	Service Type
1xxx	3 or 4	Emergency and Service Numbers
2xx	7	Not used
3xx	9	M2M
4xx	7	Landlines (Excluding Capital Region)
5xx	7	Landlines (Reykjavík and Capital Region)
6xx	7	Mobile network (Sýn) and Tetra
7xx	7	Mobile network (NOVA)
8xx	7	Mobile network (Síminn)
800	7	Freephone
9xx	7	Premium Rate Services

Geographic numbers for landlines were historically fixed to area codes and is still loosely followed currently when a new landline is installed, a sample of which is shown below. However, since the advent of telephone number portability, any landline number can be ported to another area of the country and therefore the old area codes are not a definitive indication of location. In addition, mobile number portability means that number pools assigned originally assigned to one carrier can be ported over by the user.

- Reykjavík, Vesturbær and Miðbærinn – 551 xxxx, 552 xxxx, 561 xxxx or 562 xxxx
- Reykjanes - 42x xxxx
  - Keflavík – 421 xxxx
- Vesturland - 43x xxxx
- Vestfirðir and Norðurland Vestra - 45x xxxx
- Norðurland Eystra - 46x xxxx
  - Akureyri – 462 xxxx
- Austurland - 47x xxxx
- Suðurland - 48x xxx

=== Special numbers ===
- Emergency services - 112
- Directory inquiries - 1818, 1819 or 1800
- National Health Advisory 24/7 - 1700
- Red Cross helpline - 1717
- Road condition information (Icelandic Road Administration) - 1777
