= TAT-9 =

Transatlantic telephone cable

TAT-9 was the 9th transatlantic telephone cable system, in operation from 1992 to 2004, operating at 560 Mbit/s (80,000 telephone circuits) between Europe (Goonhilly, United Kingdom; Saint-Hilaire-de-Riez, France; Conil de la Frontera, Spain) and North America (Manahawkin, United States; Pennant Point, Nova Scotia, Canada). It was built by an international consortium of co-owners and suppliers. Co-owners included AT&T Corporation, British Telecom and France Telecom.

TAT-9 was the first fiber optic system to operate at 565 Mbit/s, twice the speed of the first transatlantic fiber optic system, TAT-8. It was also the first system to have the ability to switch traffic on demand between the five landing points: Canada, the United States, France, Spain and the United Kingdom. This enabled the smaller countries in the network to afford their own landing points, and also allowed the network to accommodate for large changes in traffic demands at any individual station, such as the dramatic increase during the 1992 Olympic Games in Barcelona.

The first-ever fiber optic switching devices that allowed for switching were called Undersea Branching Multiplexers (UBMs).
