= Míla =

Telecommunications company in Iceland

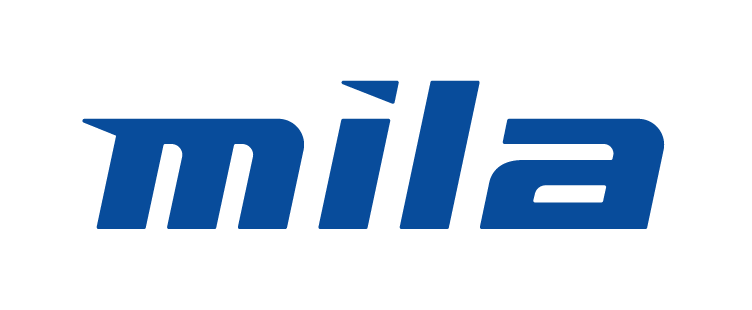
- Industry: Telecommunications
- Founded: April 2007; 19 years ago
- Headquarters: Stórhöfði 22-30, Reykjavík, Iceland
- Key people: Erik Figueras Torras (CEO); Marinó Örn Tryggvason (Chairman)
- Operating income: 9,230 million ISK (2023)
- Net income: 787 million ISK (2023)
- Total assets: 83,982 million ISK (2023)
- Number of employees: 147
- Parent: Ardian
- Website: www.mila.is

Míla is an Icelandic telecommunications company that is wholly owned by Ardian. It owns, operates and maintains Iceland's largest trunk telecommunication network, copper and fibre access networks as well as a radio access network.

It was established in 2007 following its split from Síminn, the former state-owned incumbent telecom.

== History ==
Iceland's former incumbent telecom operator, Síminn traces its history back to 1906. The incumbent was split from postal operations (Iceland Post) in 1998 and was privatised in 2005 as Síminn, when it was sold to Skipti hf.

Shortly after, the physical trunk and access network were split into a new company called Míla in 2007 in a similar approach to Openreach being split from BT.

The firm remained under the ownership of the former incumbent until 2022, when it was sold to the French private equity firm Ardian.

== Operations ==
Míla operates a national telecommunications trunk and access network serving the whole of Iceland. Leased line services include Ethernet, DWDM, STM and E-carrier. It offers wholesale services to internet service providers, data centres and other telecommunications companies in Iceland.

The original basis of its domestic operations is a fibre ring that encircles the country, roughly following the route of Iceland's ring road (Route 1). It was constructed in 1989–1991 by the Icelandic Government and NATO to link radar stations of the Iceland Air Defence System. It consists of 8 fibres, 5 of which are owned by Míla. The fibre ring has now been duplicated or replaced on most routes and Míla's fibre reaches almost all towns in the country. It also operates a microwave transmission network.

Míla operates a fibre access network to households and businesses in Iceland based on GPON and XGS-PON offered through wholesale access to internet service providers, nominally offering 1 Gbit/s speeds. In 2023, Míla began offering 10 Gbit/s service to households.

Míla inherited the copper access network from the former incumbent operator, which supplies ADSL and VDSL services. VDSL services were introduced in 2009, offering between 50 and 100 Mbit/s speeds. Previously, the copper network served analogue telephone (POTS) and ISDN services, but were shut down in 2022. In 2024, Míla announced a full copper phase-out including the closure of DSL connections on a rolling basis by 2028.

== See also ==
- Síminn
- Internet in Iceland
- Telecommunications in Iceland
