= Pennant Point, Nova Scotia =

Coordinates: 44°25′51″N 63°39′00″W

Pennant Point in Nova Scotia

Pennant Point is a rural community located at the head of Pennant Harbour near Sambro on the Chebucto Peninsula in the Halifax Regional Municipality Nova Scotia on Route 349.

Pennant Point is part of the Crystal Crescent Beach Provincial Park, which is popular with hikers and beachgoers.

== Communications ==
- Telephone exchange 902 - 868
- First three digits of postal code - B3V

=== Submarine cables ===
Pennant Point is a junction for Submarine communications cables from the United States, Europe, and Newfoundland. It connects with Herring Cove, Nova Scotia, about 12 km linear or about 20 km road distance away. Some connections north from Pennant Point are actually made through Herring Cove.

==== List of cables ====
- TAT-9 – Manahawkin, United States – Conil de la Frontera, Spain, Goonhilly Downs, England, Saint-Hilaire-de-Riez, France – 8,358 kilometers
- CANTAT-3 – Vestmannaeyjar, Iceland – Tjørnuvík, Faroe Islands – Redcar, United Kingdom – Blaabjerg, Denmark —7,104 kilometers
- CANUS 1 – Manasquan, United States – 1,360 kilometers
- CANTAT-2 – retired – Widemouth Bay, England – 5,195 kilometers

=== Satellite station ===
A small satellite station operates the Inmarsat system from Pennant Point.

== Parks ==
- Crystal Crescent Beach Provincial Park
