= Kvong =

Village in Varde Municipality, Denmark

Coordinates: 55.76054°N 8.43458°E

Kvong is a small town with a population of only 203 (1 January 2023) located in Varde Municipality in the southwestern part of the Danish peninsula of Jutland.
