= Hive (Internet service provider) =

Tal
- Company type: Private
- Industry: Telecommunications
- Founded: 2004 (as Hive); 2008 (as Tal)
- Defunct: 2015 (merged into 365 miðlar)
- Headquarters: Reykjavík, Iceland
- Products: Telephone, Internet, VoIP, Wi-Fi, WiMax
- Website: www.hive.is (now redirected to https://syn.is/)

HIVE was the third-largest telecommunications company in Iceland, founded in 2004. It provided broadband ADSL connections and a VoIP telephone system as well as Wi-Fi fixed and mobile wireless access. In 2008, HIVE merged with SKO., another telecommunications company, and together they took up the name Tal. In 2015, Tal merged into 365 miðlar.

== Competition ==
Póstur og sími had a monopoly on most telecommunications services until 1998. That year, a new law came into effect and the market opened for competition. The first competitor was TAL. Others followed, the biggest one being Íslandssími. In the Internet (ISP) market, the competition was much tougher, with names like Íslandssími, Halló!, Margmiðlun, Skíma, Skrín, Snerpa, Íslandía and Miðheimar and others. In 2003, TAL, Íslandssími and Halló! merged under the name Og Vodafone. Og Vodafone has since then bought a few Icelandic Internet service providers. On October 6, Og Vodafone changed its name to Vodafone.

== See also ==
- Iceland Telecom
- Vodafone
