= Nova (Iceland) =

Icelandic telecommunications company

Nova hf.
- Type: Hlutafélag
- Industry: Telecommunications
- Founded: 2007; 19 years ago
- Headquarters: Reykjavík, Iceland
- Products: Fixed-line telephone; Mobile telephony; Broadband; Digital television
- Website: www.nova.is

Nova, stylised as NOVA, is an Icelandic telecommunications company that began operations on December 1, 2007. Nova owns and operates its own 3G/4G/5G mobile network and offers FTTH fibre internet services through bit-stream access.

Nova ehf. was established in May 2006. At the end of March 2007, Nova received a 3G operating license and then officially opened on December 1, 2007. On April 4, 2013, Nova launched 4G/LTE service, the first for an Icelandic telephone company. On May 5, 2020, Nova launched its 5G network, again a first for Iceland. Nova's initial growth is attributed to its offer of free calls and SMS between its own subscribers, popular with younger consumers. Nova is the 2nd largest mobile phone company in Iceland with 32.9% market share in 2020 according to Electronic Communications Office of Iceland.

== Distribution ==
Nova operates its own 3G, 4G and 5G mobile and network networks, which covers about 95% of the population. By the end of 2011, users had reached 100,000, reaching 156,000 in 2020.

In 2007, Vodafone Iceland and Nova commenced a network sharing agreement between each other's mobile networks. The agreement meant that Vodafone had access to Nova's then-new 3G mobile network and Nova had access to Vodafone's GSM mobile network. In January 2025, Nova discontinued its 2G (GSM) service and plans to shut down its 3G service by the end of 2025.

== Advertising campaigns ==
Nova has made several advertisements that have generated a lot of discussion. In 2020 an advertisement campaign with the slogan "Allir úr" ("Everyone out [of your clothes]") featured several naked people wearing smartwatches doing normal activities like walking, running, swimming and dancing. The message behind the advertisement was to by using a smartwatch you would be able to leave your phone behind, improving your mental health. They also wanted to talk about body positivity, saying "we are of all kinds of shapes and sizes" and that there's nothing to be ashamed of. The advertisement was shared on the social media platform Reddit where it got 30,000 upvotes and 3,000 comments, it was also shared on the video hosting platform Vimeo where it got 730 thousand views.

In 2023 an advertising campaign with the slogan "Elskum öll" ("Love everyone") premiered that showed multiple couples of many different sexualities, gender identities, ethnicities and abilities kissing, urging people to love everyone regardless of sexuality, gender identity or ethnicity. Playing in the background was the song Þú fullkomnar mig ("You complete me") by Sálin hans Jóns míns played by the band Bjartar sveiflur.

Nova was awarded the 'Marketing Company of the Year' in 2009 and 2014.

== See also ==
- Síminn
- Telecommunications in Iceland
- Internet in Iceland
