= Vortex (ISP) =

Hringiðan ehf
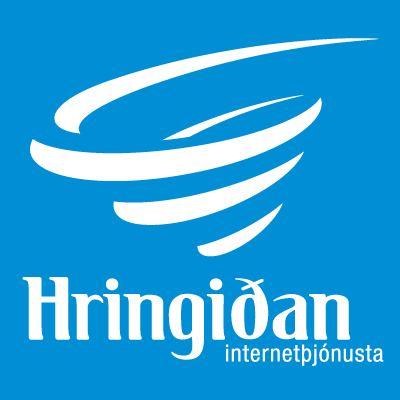
- Company type: Private
- Industry: Information technology
- Founded: Reykjavik, Iceland (March 1995)
- Headquarters: Reykjavik, Iceland
- Area served: Iceland
- Services: Internet service provider
- Website: hringidan.is

Hringiðan ehf (Vortex Inc.) is an Internet service provider operating in Iceland. They offer ADSL, VDSL and fiber Internet connections for individuals and companies, website hosting and landline phone services.

Hringiðan was founded in March 1995, which makes the company one of the oldest ISP's in Iceland.

Hringiðan was one of three companies to first launch fiber in co-operation with Gagnaveita Reykjavíkur for individuals in 2005.
