= Síminn =

Icelandic telecommunications company

Síminn hf.
- Company type: Hlutafélag
- Traded as: Nasdaq Iceland: SIMINN
- Industry: Telecommunications, Entertainment
- Founded: 1904; 122 years ago (as Talsímahlutafelag Reykjavíkur); 1906; 120 years ago (as Landssími Íslands); 1935; 91 years ago (Merged with Icelandic Post); 1998; 28 years ago (Demerger from Icelandic Post); 2005; 21 years ago (Privatisation)
- Headquarters: Reykjavík, Iceland
- Key people: Jón Sigurðsson, Chairman; María Björk Einarsdóttir, President & CEO; Óskar Hauksson CFO
- Products: Fixed line, Mobile, Internet, Television, Streaming media
- Revenue: 23.232 billion ISK (2018)
- Number of employees: 300
- Website: www.siminn.is

Síminn hf. (Note: hf. stands for hlutafélag (lit. 'shares partnership', cf. limited liability company).) (Icelandic pronunciation: [ˈsiːmɪn], lit. 'The Telephone'; also known as Iceland Telecom Ltd.), previously named Landssíminn ([ˈlan(t)sˌsiːmɪn], lit. 'The National Telephone'), is an Icelandic telecommunications company. It offers communication services for both private and corporate clients, including mobile (4G/5G), landline, internet, IPTV, streaming services and television production.

As a former incumbent state-owned telecom, it was split from Iceland Post (Íslandspóstur) in 1998 and later privatised in 2005. In 2007 its infrastructure arm was split off as Míla, sold off in 2022. Síminn is listed on the Icelandic stock exchange.

Síminn operates a 5G/4G mobile network reaching over 99% of Iceland's population. In 2018, Síminn was the largest wireless carrier in Iceland with a market share of 34.5%.

== History ==
Síminn is the privatised sector of Iceland's previously state owned incumbent postal and telecom operator, Póstur og Sími ([ˈpʰoustʏr ɔːɣ ˈsiːmɪ], lit. 'Post and Telephone'). The Iceland State Telephone Service was founded the same year as telephone technology arrived in Iceland, in 1906. In 1935, the telephone and postal services were consolidated. In 1998, they were again separated, and the company Landssíminn, was split from Íslandspóstur (Iceland Post).

=== Telegraphy ===
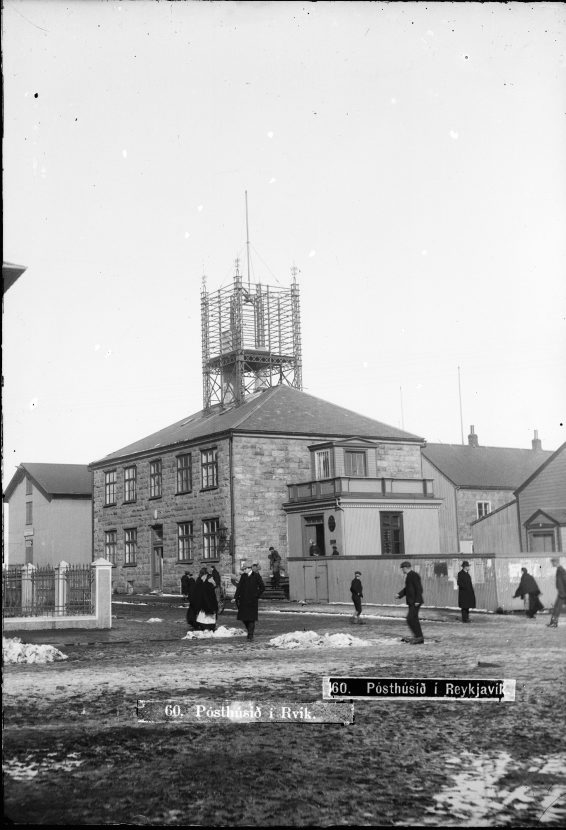
Reykjavík telephone exchange and Landssíminn headquarters ca. 1910 at Pósthússtræti 3.

In 1906, a submarine telegraph cable was laid by the Great Northern Telegraph Co. from Scotland through the Faroe Islands to Iceland, where it came ashore on the east coast at Seyðisfjörður.

In conjunction, a telegraph and telephone line was laid from the landing point to the capital city Reykjavík, housed in the main post office at Pósthússtræti 3. A national company operating telegraph and telephone services was established as Landssíminn.

=== Telephony ===
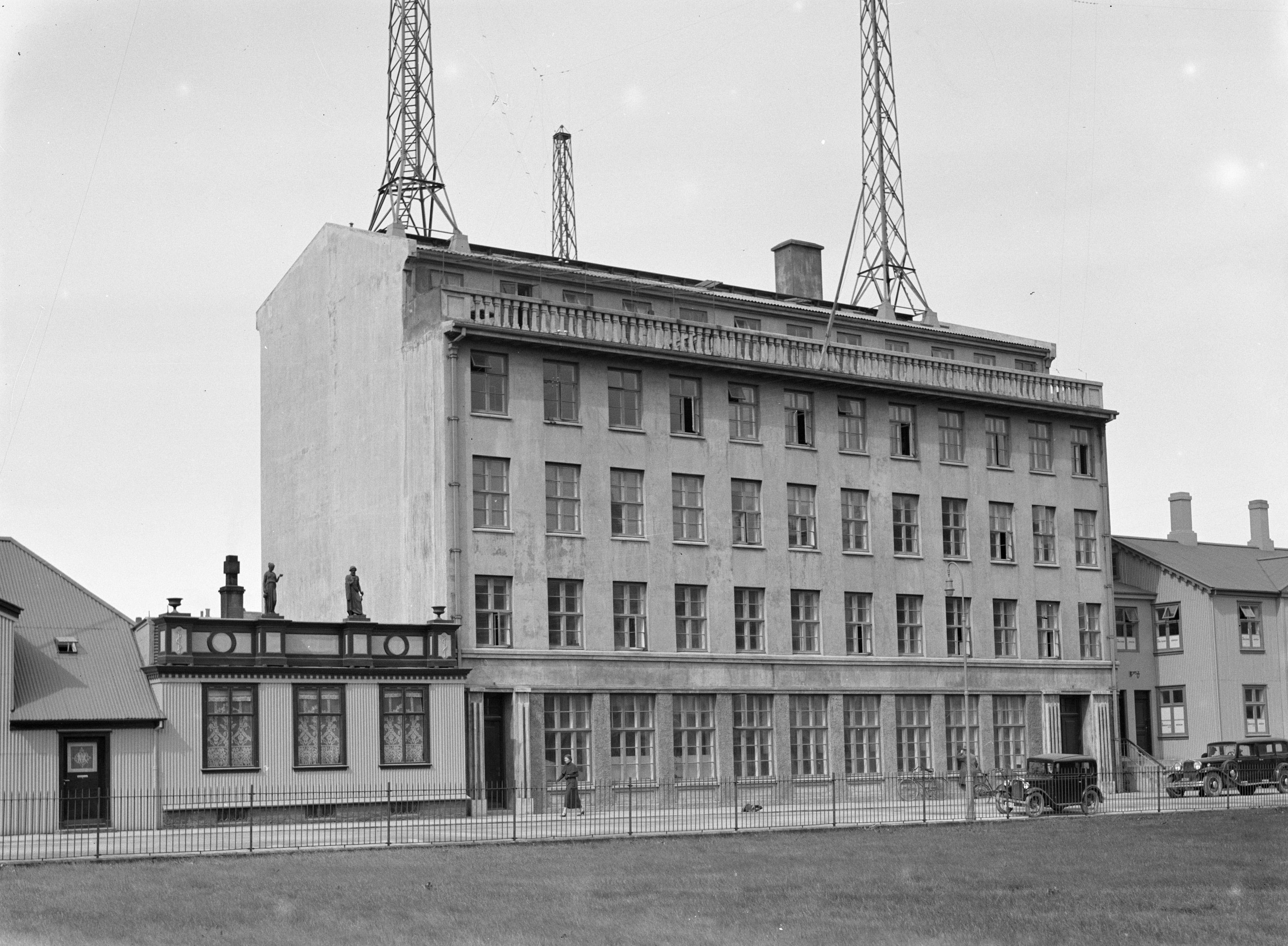
Landssíminn headquarters constructed in 1931, at Austurvöllur.

The first private telephone links were set up in 1890s in Ísafjörður as well as a line connecting Reykjavík and Hafnarfjörður. The first telephone network using a switchboard exchange was opened in 1904 as Talsímahlutafélag Reykjavíkur (the Reykjavík Telephone Company), a private undertaking with 20 subscribers initially, at Pósthússtræti 2 in a timber structure.

Shortly after, in 1908 the exchange was moved to the upper floor of the main post office at Pósthússtræti 3. In 1912, the Reykjavík Telephone Company was merged into Landssíminn. At the time, the there were 300 subscribers. The building at Pósthússtræti 3 was later fully acquired by the telecom in 1916 and housed the company offices and the Reykjavík telephone exchange.

In 1931, a larger headquarters was built at Austurvöllur. Simultaneously, the first automatic telephone exchange (Ericsson AGF) was opened in the new building, a second automatic exchange was opened in Hafnarfjörður the next year.

==== Subscriber trunk dialling ====
Subscriber trunk dialling, which allowed direct long-distance calls without operator assistance, was introduced in 1951 in the southwest of the country. Two-digit area codes were introduced at this time, numbered from 91 to 98 counting clockwise around the country starting in Reykjavík. Trunk dialling was later extended to Akureyri in 1965 and all telephones in the country were connected to automatic telephone exchanges by 1986. The laying of telephone lines in rural areas was completed around 1960.

==== Digital exchanges and fibre-optics ====
The laying of fibre-optic cables around the country began in 1985. The first digital telephone exchange (Ericsson AXE) was opened in Reykjavík in 1984. This technology was extended to all telephone exchanges by 1995.

In conjunction, in 1995 a new telephone numbering plan was introduced with 7 digits and new area codes. In 1997, all phone calls were offered at a flat minute rate nationwide, ending long-distance surcharges. ISDN services were introduced from 1996.

=== International calling ===
Shortwave telephone communications with Denmark and Britain were opened in 1935, and to New York in 1946. The first submarine telephone cables, SCOTICE and ICECAN, to Scotland and Canada were opened in 1962. The cable allowed international subsea telephone calls and telex services to be established in Iceland. At the same time the 1906 telegraph cable was taken out of use.

In 1980, the Skyggnir satellite ground station came online, and telephone calls to other countries then went via satellite and international direct dialling (IDD) to other countries became possible for the first time. By 1987 the submarine cables ICECAN and SCOTICE were obsolete. In 1994, the first fibre optic, packet-switched, submarine cable CANTAT-3 was opened.

=== Mobile telephony ===
The 1G NMT system went into operation in 1986 but closed in 2010. The 2G GSM system launched in 1994 and 3G in 2007, but both were shut down in 2025.

SMS service was launched in 1997. 4G was launched in 2013 and mid-band 5G in 2021

=== Internet services ===
Dial-up services first launched bý Síminn in 1996. In 1999, ADSL broadband was put into operation by Síminn, quickly reaching all urban areas of Iceland. A coaxial cable television service, initially also offering cable internet, was partially rolled out by from 1997 to select areas, but the rollout slowed by 2005 in place of ADSL and fibre services, eventually being completely discontinued in 2010.

In early 2004 Iceland Telecom deployed its IPTV service, which includes Live TV and Video on Demand via the ADSL system, allowing Síminn to offer triple-play services (integrated telephone, television and internet offerings).

In 2009, Míla (in cooperation with Síminn) launched its VDSL service and FTTH (GPON) fibre technology, dubbed Ljósnet. It initially offered 50 Mb/s services, subsequently upgraded to 100 Mb/s where available. Full-fibre based services (FTTH) were later upgraded to 1 Gb/s for using GPON technology and in 2023 offered 10 Gbit/s services.

=== Privatization and sale of Míla ===
In July 2005, the Icelandic government privatized Landssími Íslands and sold its 98.8% share to Skipti ehf. In December 2005, three companies, Landssími Íslands, Íslenska sjónvarpsfélagið (SkjárEinn) and the parent company, Skipti ehf., merged and the name was subsequently changed to Síminn hf.

In March 2007, a new parent company called Skipti hf. was introduced and Síminn was split into three companies: Síminn, the main operating company; Fasteignafélagið Jörfi ehf, a real estate company; and Míla which owns and operates the physical national trunk and access networks in Iceland. The new structural change took effect from 31 October 2006.

In 2021, Míla, Síminn's infrastructure arm was sold to Ardian, raising 46 billion ISK, raising questions about national security infrastructure being sold to foreign investors.

Síminn entered a partnership with Ericsson in 2017 in infrastructure deployment in its mobile network.

==== Shutdown of services ====
Síminn shut down its PSTN/POTS/ISDN telephone services in 2024, transferring customers to VoIP services. In addition, 2G and 3G systems were shut down in 2025.

== Competition ==
The state-owned Póstur og Sími had a monopoly on most telecommunications services until 1998. That year, a new law came into effect, and the market opened for competition. The first competitor was TAL, offering mobile services at reduced prices. Others followed, the biggest one being Íslandssími. The ISP market the competition saw many new providers entering the market, such as Halló!, Margmiðlun, Skíma, Skrín, Snerpa, Íslandía, 365 Media, HIVE, NOVA, Hringdu and Miðheimar. In 2003, TAL, Íslandssími and Halló! merged under the name Og Vodafone. On 6 October 2006, Og Vodafone changed its name to Vodafone Iceland. Vodafone has since then bought a few Icelandic internet service providers including TAL and 365.

== See also ==
- Míla
- Íslandspóstur (Iceland Post)
- Telecommunications in Iceland
- Telephone numbers in Iceland
- Internet in Iceland
- Swedish telephone plugs & sockets – the old five-port Swedish telefonjack connector was previously used in Iceland.
