= Blaabjerg =

Former municipality in Denmark

Coordinates: 55°46′46″N 8°17′22″E

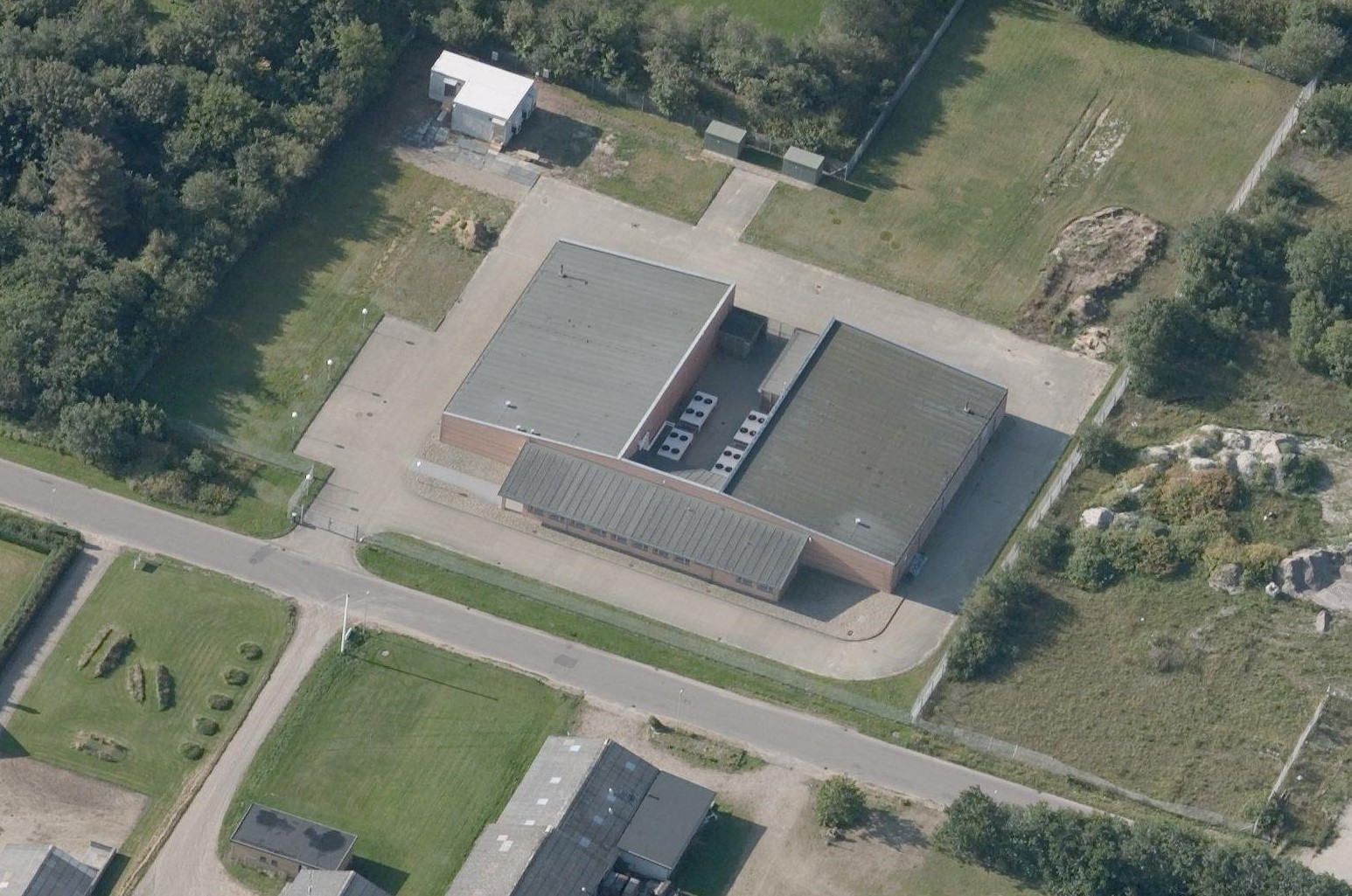
TAT-14 landing station Blaabjerg

Until January 1, 2007, Blaabjerg (Danish: Blåbjerg - literally blue mountain) was a municipality (Danish, kommune) in Ribe County on the west coast of the Jutland peninsula in southwest Denmark. The municipality covered an area of 254 km^{2}, and had a total population of 6,509 (2005). Its latest mayor was Preben Olesen. The site of its municipal council was the town of Nørre Nebel.

The municipality was created in 1970 due to a kommunalreform ("Municipality Reform") that combined the following parishes: Henne, Kvong, Lunde, Lydum, Lønne, Nørre Nebel, and Ovtrup Parish.

Blaabjerg municipality ceased to exist due to Kommunalreformen ("The Municipality Reform" of 2007). It was merged with the former Blåvandshuk, Helle, Varde, and Ølgod municipalities to form a new Varde municipality.

Blaabjerg and the city of Nørre Nebel is home to a landing station where multiple transatlantic telephone cable systems are terminated, including DANICE, CANTAT-3 and Havfrue (the latter replacing TAT-14 in end of 2020).
