= CANTAT-3 =

Canadian transatlantic telecommunications cable

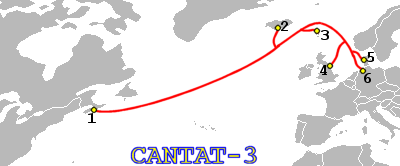
- Owners: Føroya Tele
- Landing points: 1. Pennant Point, Nova Scotia, Canada (defunct since 2010); 2. Vestmannaeyjar, Iceland (turned off in 2023); 3. Tjørnuvík, Faroe Islands; 4. Redcar, North Yorkshire, UK (defunct); 5. Blaabjerg, Denmark; 6. Sylt, Germany; 7. Valdemar Oil Platforms, North Sea
- Design capacity: 2.5 Gigabit/Second
- Technology: NL-16 laser regenerative
- Date of first use: 1994

CANTAT-3 was the third Canadian transatlantic telecommunications cable, in regular operation from 1994 to 2010, carrying 3 x 2.5 Gbit/s between Canada and Europe. It branches to both Iceland and the Faroe Islands. It is out of normal service for international bandwidth and is currently operated by Føroya Tele to service oil platforms in the North Sea.

== Landing Points ==
The landing points are:

1. Pennant Point, Nova Scotia, Canada (defunct since 2010)
2. Vestmannaeyjar, Iceland (Turned off in 2023)
3. Tjørnuvík, Faroe Islands
4. Redcar, North Yorkshire, UK (defunct)
5. Blaabjerg, Denmark
6. Sylt, Germany
7. Valdemar Oil Platforms, North Sea (connected in 2012)

== History ==
CANTAT-3 is the only NL-16 laser regenerative 2.5 Gig/s submarine system built in the world. Part of this huge system was built at STC Submarine Networks, Portland, Oregon, USA, from 1993–1994 (which later became Alcatel Submarine Networks). STC Submarine Networks in Southampton, Hampshire, UK, made the rest of the system. The Canadian portion (shore end system) was laid off Nova Scotia by the Teleglobe cable ship CS John Cabot. The main-lay portion was deployed off Nova Scotia towards the Faroes on board the AT&T ship Global Mariner. Other cable ships were involved in the completion of this system. This was the northernmost cable system ever deployed at the time.

CANTAT-3 was operated by India's Teleglobe.

On December 17, 2006, CANTAT-3 services were disrupted due to damage to the submarine cable, resulting in degradation of service to hundreds of thousands of users connecting via internet and media providers (Síminn, Vodafone and Hive). The country was however backed up by the second submarine cable, FARICE-1 The most notable effect of the event was a temporary shut-down of data communications by Iceland's universities and hospitals, which relied exclusively on CANTAT-3's services. Although it was predicted that a full recovery of the cable would take ten days, starting from midnight on January 13, 2007, it actually took until July 29, 2007 before service was fully restored. During that time, the Icelandic universities and hospitals in Akureyri and Reykjavík relied on emergency connectivity obtained via local internet providers Síminn and Vodafone. The Icelandic government decided not to buy extra bandwidth for the university network through the functioning FARICE-1 cable, despite being a large shareholder in FARICE-1.

Given that CANTAT-3 suffered multiple interruptions, the alternative cables FARICE-1, DANICE and Greenland Connect were established and/or expanded to ensure cabled telecommunication connectivity in Iceland. CANTAT-3 also had too little capacity by 2007 for domestic Internet usage, and became outdated as soon as the DANICE cable came into operation by 2009.

== Usage ==
Føroya Tele (Faroese Telecom) took over ownership and operation of the cable in 2012 to service oil platforms in the North Sea.

As of 2022, CANTAT-3 is still in use and is powered from the Faroe Islands, Germany, Denmark and Valdemar Oil Platforms. Given its obsolete bandwidth capacity, providing service to oil platforms is the currently the primary function of CANTAT-3. The transatlantic portion as well as the spur to England is no longer in operation and has not been replaced.
