= FARICE-1 =

Submarine communications cable

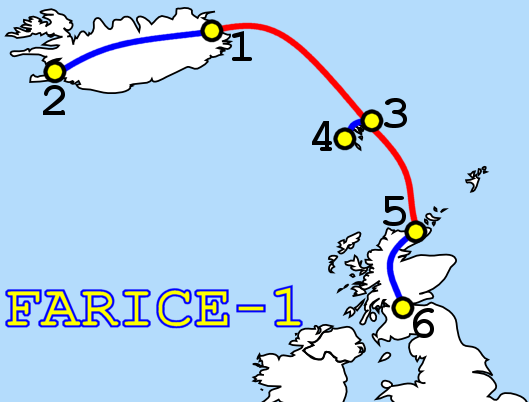
- Red is submarine, Blue is terrestrial, now extended to London.
- Owners: Farice
- Landing points: 1. Seyðisfjörður, Iceland; 3. Funningsfjørður, Faroe Islands; 5. Dunnet Bay, Caithness, Highland, Scotland
- Total length: 1,205 kilometres (749 mi)
- Design capacity: 720 Gbit/s
- Currently lit capacity: 11 Tbit/s
- Date of first use: January 2004

FARICE-1 is a submarine communications cable connecting Iceland, the Faroe Islands and Scotland. The cable has been in use since January 2004 and is 100% owned by Iceland. The cable had an initial design capacity of 720 Gbit/s and is a two fibre pair design. The length of the cable is 1205 km for the direct route between Iceland and Scotland. The cable structure and repeaters were made by Pirelli and the terminal equipment was supplied by TYCO. In the year 2013 the terminal equipment was upgraded by Ciena (100 Gbit/s technology) bringing the total capacity of the submarine cable to 11 Tbit/s. The cable has service access points in Reykjavik and Keflavik Airport as well as in London Telehouse East. The company Farice ehf sells services over the FARICE-1 cable. FARICE-2 was never built. DANICE is the complementary submarine cable.

The landing points are:

- 1. Seyðisfjörður, Iceland, backhauled to Reykjavík and KEF Airport
- 3. Funningsfjørður, Faroe Islands, backhauled to 4. Tórshavn
- 5. Dunnet Bay, Caithness, Highland, Scotland, backhauled to London Telehouse (previously Edinburgh)

== See also ==
- Danice
- SHEFA-2
- Greenland Connect
- CANTAT-3
