= .is =

Internet country-code top level domain for Iceland

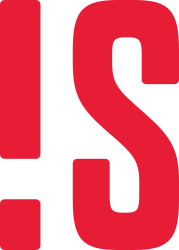
- Introduced: 11 December 1986
- TLD type: country code top-level domain
- Status: Active
- Registry: ISNIC
- Sponsor: ISNIC
- Intended use: Entities connected with Iceland
- Actual use: Very popular in Iceland
- Registered domains: 91,705 (2024-05-16)
- Registration restrictions: None
- Structure: Registrations are directly at second level
- Documents
- Dispute policies: Icelandic Consumer Agency and/or ISNIC's Board of Appeals
- DNSSEC: Yes
- Registry website: www.isnic.is

.is (dot is) is the country code top-level domain (ccTLD) for Iceland. The country code is derived from the first two letters of Ísland, which is the Icelandic word for Iceland. Registration of .is domains is open to all people and companies without any special restriction.

The first .is domain, hi.is, is the domain of Háskóli Íslands (University of Iceland). It was registered on 11 December 1986, making it one of the earliest ever domain registrations on the Internet. The domain is managed by ISNIC, a private corporation.

According to the McAfee report "Mapping the Mal Web," .is was evaluated as one of the top 10 most secure TLDs in the world in the years 2007 and 2008. As of May 2024, there were just over 91,000 .is domains registered.

As of October 2016, .is domains can be registered for up to five years.

== Domain suspensions ==
In April 2013, ISNIC briefly hosted The Pirate Bay's domain ThePirateBay.is.

In 2014, ISNIC suspended two domains which hosted material produced by the Islamic State, including Khilafah.is. In September 2017, ISNIC briefly hosted American neo-Nazi domain dailystormer.is, which had been removed by several domain registries around the world. It was pulled from its .is domain after its publisher did not fulfill the standard procedure of disclosing his address.

In September 2022, ISNIC suspended the .is domain for Kiwi Farms, a controversial internet trolling and harassment forum.

In February 2026, a .is domain hosting leaked personal information about United States Immigration and Customs Enforcement officers attracted the attention of the Icelandic government, with the police investigating the website and Infrastructure Minister Eyjólfur Ármannsson stating his support for tighter control of .is domains.
