= Danice =

Submarine cable connecting Denmark and Iceland

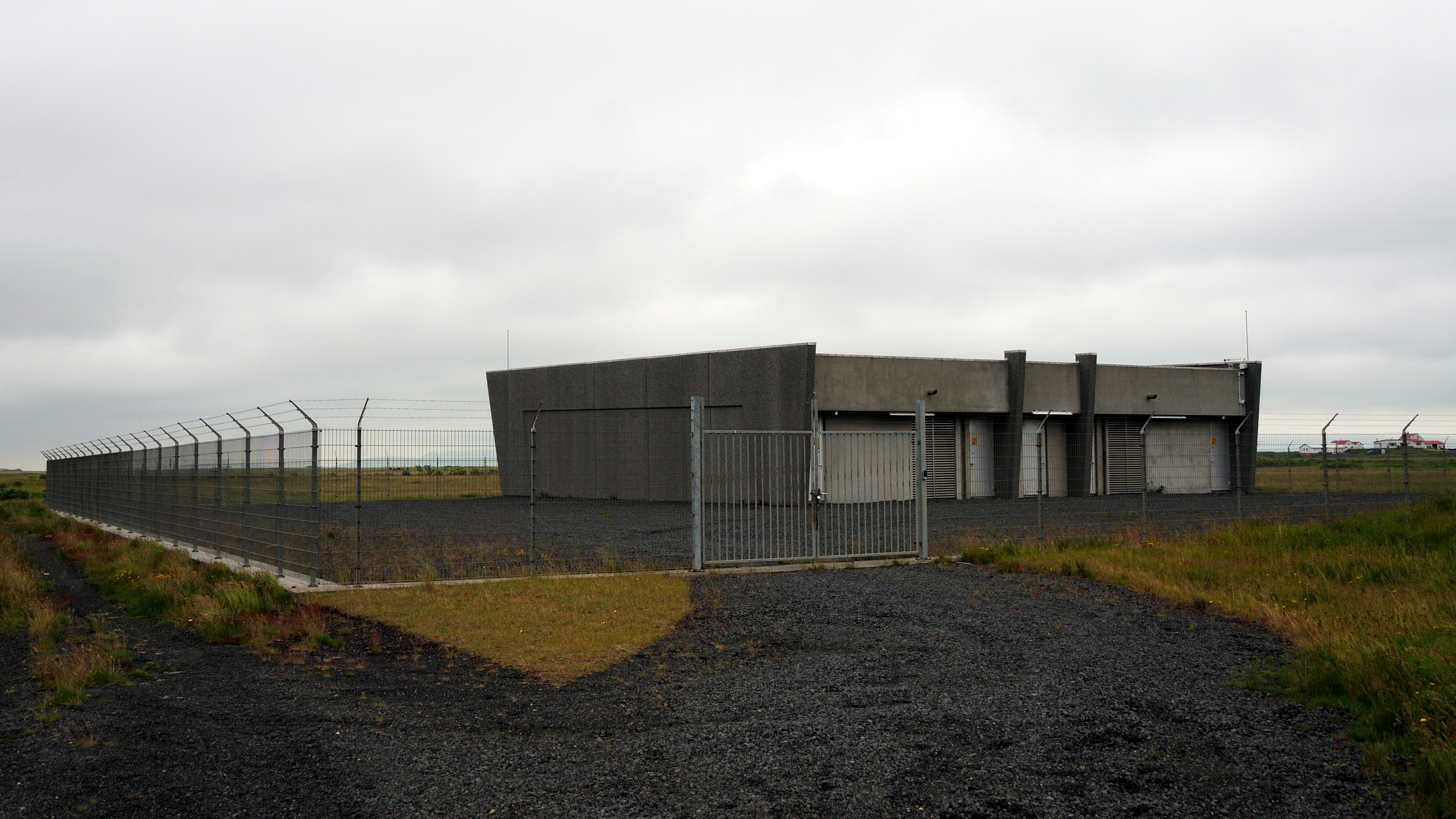
Landing point in Iceland

The DANICE submarine communications cable system transits 2250 km of the Atlantic Ocean and the North Sea to connect Iceland and Denmark. It consists of four fibre pairs, capable of carrying in total up to 36.4 Tbit/s of data using 100Gbit/s coherent wavelength technology available in 2013. The cable went into operation in November 2009 and has had no submarine faults. The operator of the cable is Farice. The complementary cable is FARICE-1. DANICE has cable landing points at:

- Landeyjarsandur, Iceland
- Blaabjerg, Denmark.

== See also ==
- FARICE-1
- Greenland Connect
- CANTAT-3
