= Tusass =

Greenlandic telecommunications company

Tusass A/S
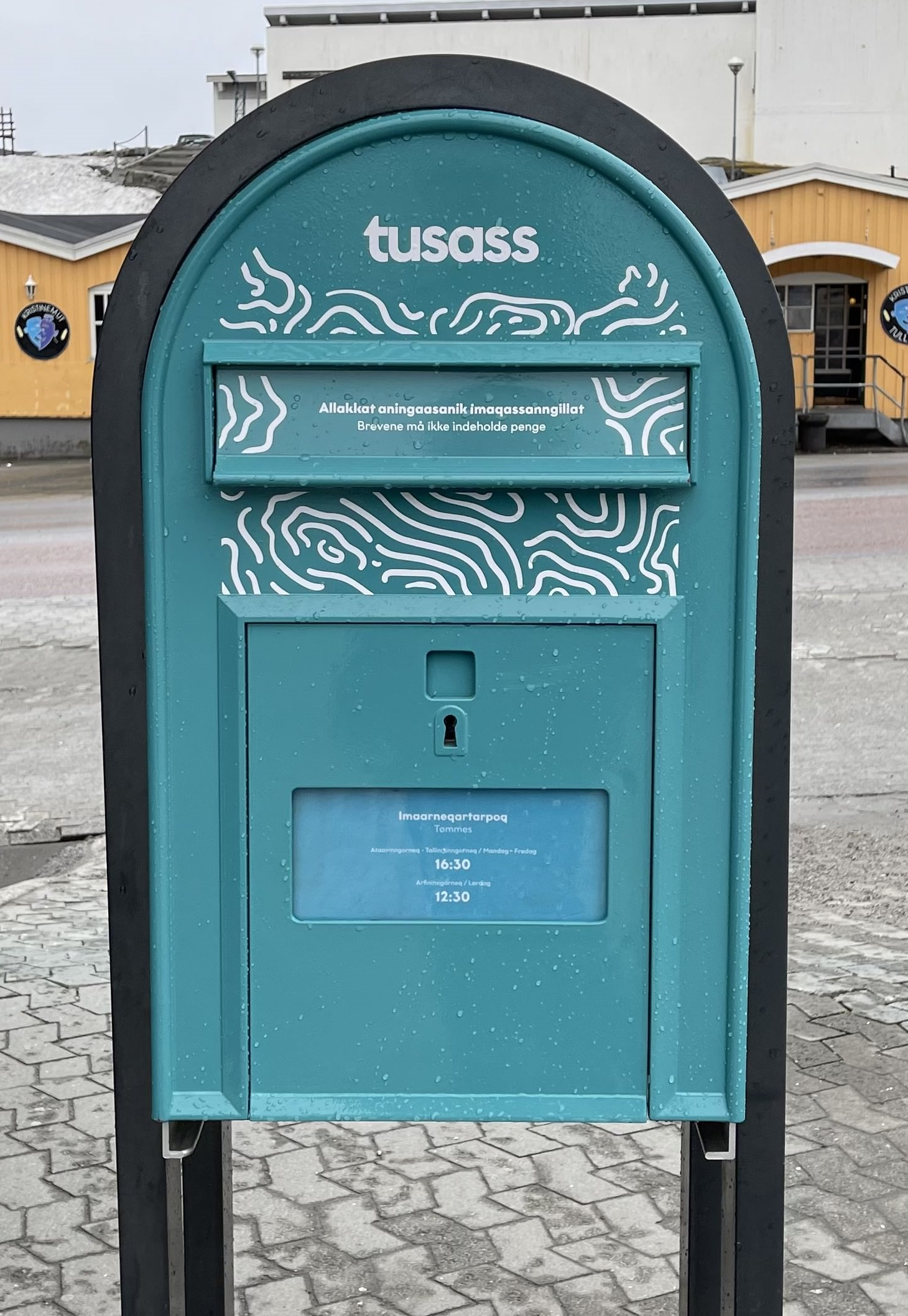
- Postbox in Nuuk with new Tusass branding
- Company type: State-owned
- Industry: Mail; Telecommunications
- Founded: 1879; 147 years ago 1997; 29 years ago (as TELE Greenland A/S); 2021; 5 years ago (rebranded as Tusass A/S)
- Headquarters: Nuuk, Greenland
- Area served: Greenland
- Products: Mobile telephony; Broadband
- Website: www.tusass.gl/en/

Tusass (formerly Tele-Post) is a Greenlandic postal and telecommunications company dating back to 1879. Tusass has a licensed monopoly on most telecommunications services in Greenland. The company's headquarters are located in Nuuk.

The company is divided into three business areas: postal (mail), commercial and IT services. Tusass manages the top-level domain for Greenland .gl, and owns the sea cable Greenland Connect.

== History ==
TELE Greenland A/S was created in 1997 through the merging of TELE Greenland and Kalaallit Allakkeriviat (Greenland Postal Service). After the merger, Kalaallit Allakkeriviat became a business unit and was renamed as POST Greenland. The common designation "TELE-POST" for both business came into being. TELE-POST was rebranded as Tusass in 2021. Tusass is Greenlandic slang for "talk to you later".

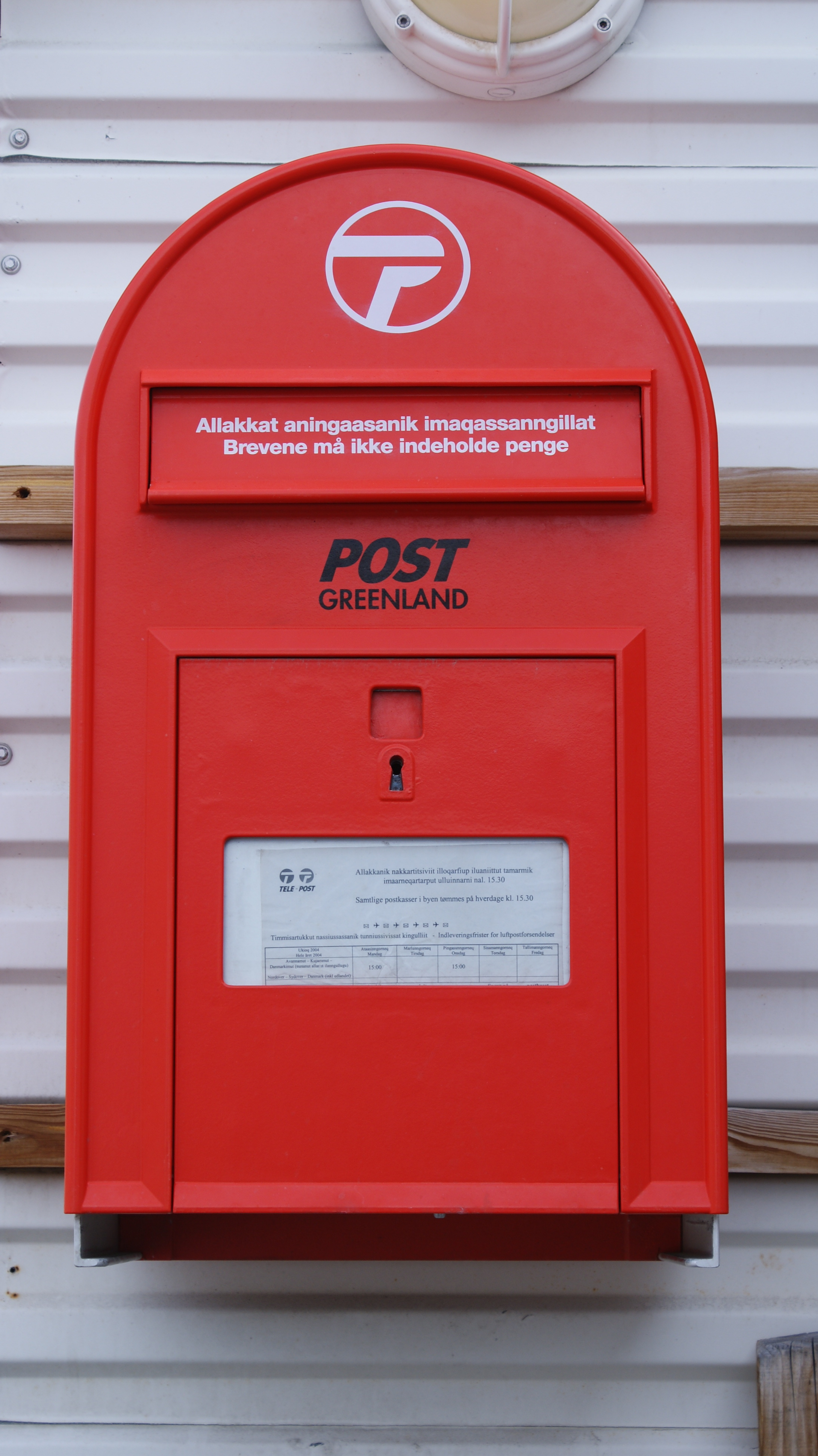
A red postbox with old Post Greenland branding by the entrance to the Uummannaq Heliport

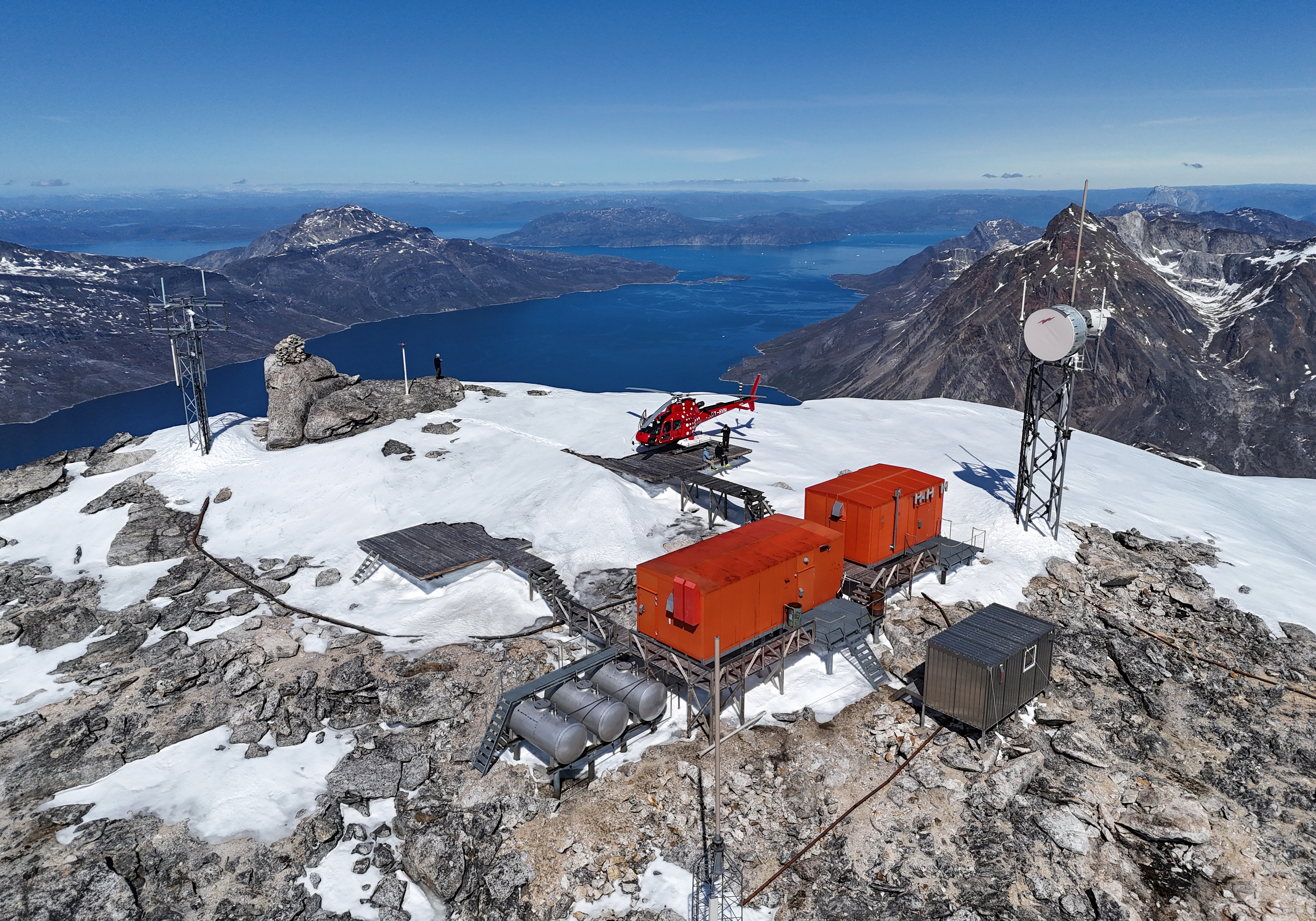
Qingaaq Telecom site owned by Tusass

== Services ==
=== Mobile ===
GSM (2G) services were launched in 1998 in Nuuk, Ilulissat, Kangerlussuaq and Sisimiut, later expanding across Greenland.

In 2009, TELE Greenland partnered with Nokia Siemens Networks to build a complete 3G network.

TELE Greenland announced in July 2013 a partnership with Nokia Siemens Networks to build a 4G network in Nuuk. The service launched 1 December 2013. Sisimiut was the second town to get 4G, it was launched on 28 March 2014. Later in 2014 the 4G network launched in Ilulissat, Kangerlussuaq and Qaqortoq. The 4G network was expanded to Maniitsoq in February 2015, and to Aasiaat in June the same year.

In November 2017 TELE-POST announced a partnership with Ericsson to modernise the entire mobile network in Greenland, as part of Tele Greenland's "Mobile First" strategy of bringing 4G high-speed internet to every city, town and settlement in Greenland.

In December 2019 it was announced that Tusass had chosen Ericsson to build a 5G network in Greenland. Tusass launched VoLTE service in February 2025, and announced a future switch-off of their 2G and 3G services. It was later announced that 3G services would seize on 1 April 2026, and 2G being available until 2027.

Tusass closed all fixed landline connections in 2022 and customers were transitioned to mobile services.

In May 2026 the first 5G mobile services launched together with an increase of the amount of data included.

=== Internet ===
ADSL internet was introduced in 2004, later expanding across Greenland.

Tusass had prior to 2022 separated their Internet offerings into three different "zones"; underwater sea cable (zone 1), radio chains (zone 2), and via satellite (zone 3). Places in zone 1 are landing points for the Greenland Connect and Greenland Connect North submarine cables. In 2016 it was decided to deploy an extension to the Greenland Connect cable, called Greenland Connect North - as well as upgrading the existing cable. Products based on these upgrades launched on 11 December 2017, and introduced VDSL services with speeds up to 30 Mbit/s for towns connected by submarine cable.

Tusass operates several radio chains. The main chain is approx. 1500 km long and consists of 48 radio chain stations. The radio chain is connected to the Greenland Connect and Connect North cables. The radio chain provides telephony, internet, radio and television. In 2016 it was announced the radio chain would be upgraded and expanded, enabling faster internet speeds as well as moving several towns and settlements from zone 3 to zone 2. This work is expected to be completed in 2018.

Several remote locations are only connected via satellites. In September 2017 Tele-Post switched from Intelsat 903 to Intelsat 35e in several locations.

The zone system has been phased out with a focus on replacing aging infrastructure. A ground station in Tasiilaq was completed in 2020 offering for the first time flat-rate broadband to the town. In late 2021 another ground station was completed in Ittoqqortoormiit, where flat-rate broadband was also introduced. Mobile broadband based on 5G Non-Standalone (NSA) Fixed Wireless Access (FWA) launched in three cities in October 2022, offering 80 Mbit/s as the top speed. In 2023 Tusass switched to a new Hispasat satellite called Amazonas Nexus (Tusass refers to it as GreenSAT), to be used for flat-rate Internet for remote farms and for the most-northern town of Qaanaaq where a new ground station has been built.

==== Current internet tiers ====
As of September 2025.

===== Satellite =====
Download speed	Upload speed
3 Mbit/s	1 Mbit/s
6 Mbit/s	2 Mbit/s

===== DSL =====
Download speed	Upload speed
5 Mbit/s	1 Mbit/s
10 Mbit/s	2 Mbit/s
30 Mbit/s	5 Mbit/s

===== 5G Mobile Broadband =====
Download speed	Upload speed
5 Mbit/s	1 Mbit/s
10 Mbit/s	2 Mbit/s
20 Mbit/s	5 Mbit/s
40 Mbit/s	10 Mbit/s
100 Mbit/s	20 Mbit/s
