= Greenland Connect =

Submarine communications cable system connecting Canada, Greenland, and Iceland

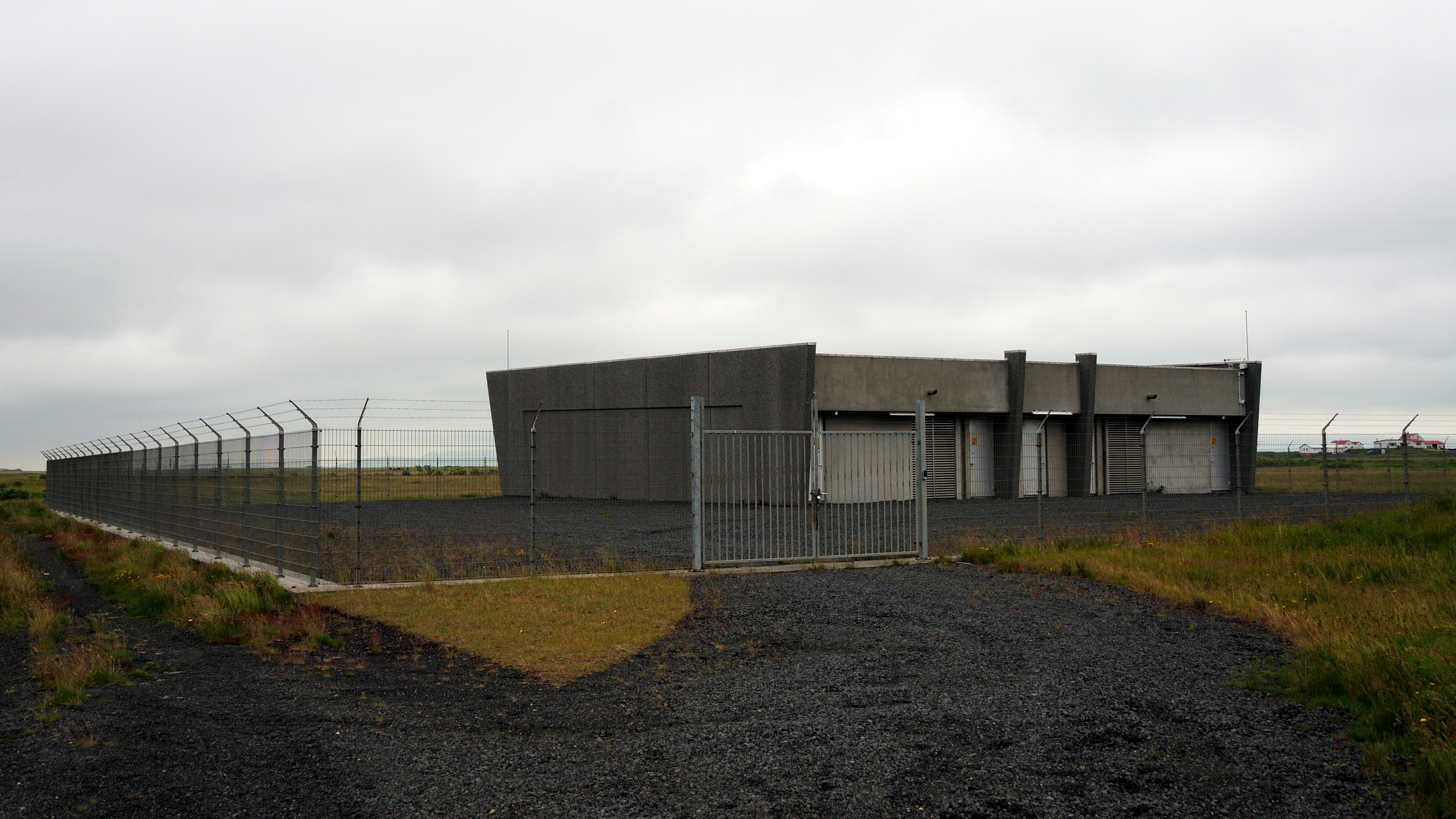
Landing point in Iceland

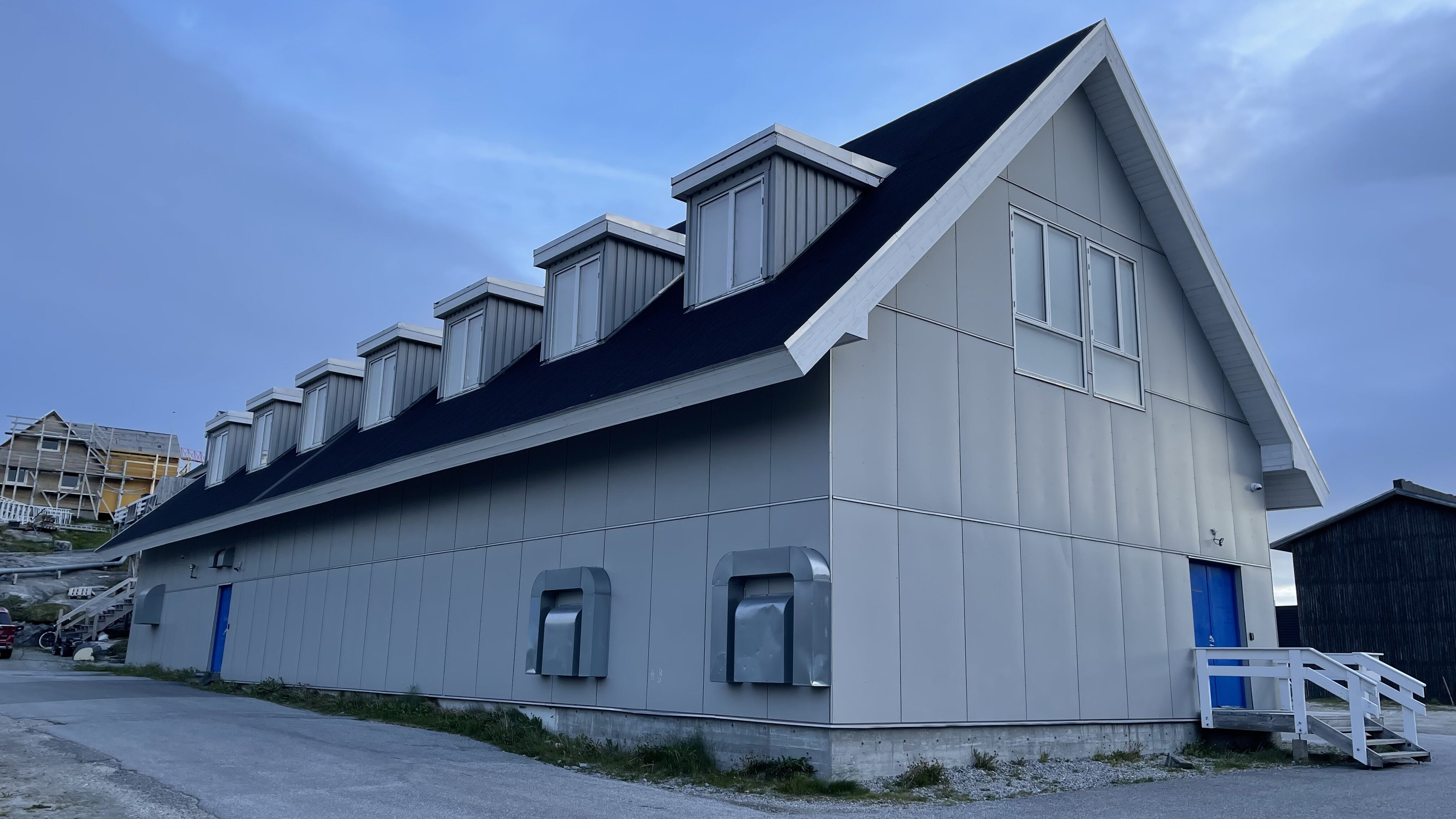
Landing point in Nuuk, Greenland

Greenland Connect is a submarine communications cable system that connects Canada, Greenland, and Iceland. The cable contains two fibre pairs specified for 128*10 Gbit/s wavelength each. Initial lit capacity is 1*10 Gbit/s for each fibre pair. Two additional 10 Gbit/s Wavelength were installed in the summer of 2010. The cable has cable landing points at:

- Milton, Trinity Bay, Newfoundland and Labrador, Canada
- Nuuk, Greenland
- Qaqortoq, Greenland
- Landeyjarsandur, South Iceland

At its endpoints, the cable is colocated with the undersea "DANICE" cable in Iceland and the Eastlink (formerly Persona Communications) "Trans-Gulf" terrestrial fibre network in Newfoundland. Together these cables interconnect the networks of major carriers in Europe and North America. The operator of this cable is TELE Greenland as part of its "4,800-km fibre optic network between Iceland and Greenland and between Greenland and Newfoundland and Labrador."

Cable was laid from Trinity Bay, Newfoundland, to Greenland by the "Maersk Responder" supported by the "Blue Castor" during July to October 2008 and from Landeyjarsandur to Greenland by the "Ile de Sein" supported by the "Ile de Brehat"

The cable was put in operation on March 23, 2009, and instantly reduced internet latency by approximately 500 ms in Nuuk.

== Greenland Connect North ==
In April 2016 the board of TELE-POST announced a decision for an extension of the sea cable along the west coast of Greenland from Nuuk towards Aasiaat. Later in 2016 it was announced that Tele Greenland had partnered with Alcatel-Lucent and Huawei Marine to both upgrade the existing Greenland Connect cable from 1.92T to 12.8T as well as deploy a 680 km extension called Greenland Connect North.

The Greenland Connect North cable has landing points at:

- Nuuk, Greenland
- Maniitsoq, Greenland
- Sisimiut, Greenland
- Aasiaat, Greenland

The cable reached Aasiaat on 8 October 2017. Services using the new cable launched on 11 December 2017.
