= Television in Iceland =

Television in Iceland is composed of the public broadcasting service of RÚV as well as four free-to-air channels and a number of subscription channels provided by local private broadcasters, including Síminn and Sýn. Streaming services are also available from international providers such as Netflix, Disney+, Viaplay and HBO Max. Television broadcasting began in Iceland in 1955 intended for U.S forces at the Keflavík Air Base. In 1966, RÚV began local television broadcasts in Icelandic.

Channels can be received through managed IPTV providers such as Síminn and Sýn, by over-the-top streaming applications and via digital terrestrial TV (DVB-T2).

== History ==
The first television broadcasts commenced in 1955 by the American Forces Radio and Television Service (AFRTS) from the Naval Air Station Keflavik. A small transmitter broadcasting at 50W on the VHF band was not intended for the local population, but nevertheless locals began installing antennas and buying US television sets to receive the broadcasts. This created concern among some local politicians and prominent individuals, claiming it would weaken Icelandic language and culture. In 1961, the power was increased to 250W. Opposition to the American broadcasts was countered by 14,000 locals, who had come to enjoy the American programming, who signed a petition demanding it stay on air. Eventually, the AFRTS ceased its terrestrial broadcasts and built a private cable TV network in 1974.

=== Icelandic television ===
Domestic television broadcasting began on 30 September 1966, for three hours every day except Thursday. After much deliberation and effort to secure funding, the Icelandic state public broadcaster, RÚV, began transmissions using PAL standards over the VHF band. It initially used the name Sjónvarpið, meaning 'The Television'. Colour television broadcasts began in 1973. The first satellite ground station, Skyggnir, opened in 1981 which allowed the first international live TV events to be broadcast in 1986.

Before satellite transmission Iceland was not a part of the Eurovision Network because of distance; all imported programs arrived by mail.

=== Independent television and cable networks ===
Stöð 2, the first independent broadcaster, began encrypted broadcasts in 1986 via terrestrial VHF which required the use of a decoder by a paid service. This was joined by Sýn and other VHF channels in the 1990s and 2000s. Stöð 2 encrypted VHF broadcasts ended in 2011.

Throughout the 1980s to 1990s, local cable TV services began being established in some towns such as Keflavík, Hafnarfjörður, Hella, Húsavik, Skagafjörður and Seltjarnarnes offering international channels received via satellite ground stations, as well as local broadcasting. Síminn began installing cable TV networks in some areas of Reykjavík from 1998, marketed as Breiðband. Síminn later acquired some cable networks including in Húsavík, and Hafnafjörður in 2002. Digital cable broadcasts (DVB-C) began in 2002 and, at its peak, the Síminn cable TV network reached 37,000 households. In 2010-2011, the Síminn HFC cable TV networks (including street cabinets) were converted for FTTC (VDSL) use, ceasing cable TV distribution. IPTV came in place of most cable networks, via fibre or DSL services.

As of 2021, all cable TV networks in Iceland are defunct and have been replaced by IPTV services, with a small exception of Kapalvæðing operating in Keflavík.

=== Pay-TV MMDS and UHF broadcasting ===
Digital Ísland (now Sýn), began operating pay-TV services using over-the-air MMDS broadcasts in the southwest of Iceland in analogue in 1993, moving to digital in 2004, serving over 70,000 households. Digital Ísland offered international programming as well as local pay TV stations. MMDS transmissions ceased in 2016.

Digital Ísland later expanded to other areas using DVB-T over UHF in 2005. This DVB-T UHF network later became the basis of Iceland's public/private shared DVB-T/T2 network facilitating the digital switchover in 2015.

=== Internet Protocol television ===
By the mid-2000s, fibre and ADSL broadband became widely available, which led to the deployment of managed IPTV systems in 2005 by Síminn followed by Vodafone Iceland in 2007. The conversion of the Síminn cable TV network to FTTC in 2010-2011 greatly expanded high-speed VDSL internet access. This allowed many new domestic and international channels to become available to households via IPTV. Iceland leads the world in IPTV subscriptions, with over 65% of households using such services in 2014.

=== Direct satellite broadcasts ===
In 2007, RÚV began direct satellite TV broadcasts using the Thor 5 satellite over DVB-S, run by Telenor, in order to service fishing fleets around Iceland and remote areas where the terrestrial network does not reach. The service was encrypted and was available only on request. RÚV's satellite TV distribution over DVB-S ceased in June 2025, as fishing fleets transitioned to IP-based solutions.

=== Digital switchover ===
In 2014 an agreement was signed between public broadcaster RÚV and Vodafone Iceland (now Sýn) on 27 March 2013 to operate nationwide digital multiplexes using DVB-T2 (for HD transmissions) and DVB-T (for SD transmissions) over UHF bands, with 99.8% population coverage using a mix of existing Digtal Ísland infrastructure and new transmission sites and equipment. Vodafone also used the same UHF infrastructure to broadcast pay-TV channels, including Stöð 2, sports and international channels using conditional access.

The digital DVB-T2 system enabled public broadcasting of RÚV in HD for the first time and facilitated a digital switchover, which occurred in phases by region from 2013-2015. The last RÚV analogue transmitter was shut down on the 2 February 2015.

Transmissions on the older DVB-T system in standard definition ceased on 3 June 2024. Terrestrial broadcasts over DVB-T2 broadcasts of RÚV in HD continued. As a result of the prevalence of fibre internet infrastructure in Iceland, as of 2022, only 1% of the population uses over-the-air terrestrial broadcasts (DVB) to watch television.

The Stöð 2 brand was retired in favour of Sýn in June 2025, and all of its channels were accordingly rebranded. In conjunction, its main linear channel, Sýn, became completely free-to-air, throughout most of its history only its evening news programme was open. In September 2026, Sýn discontinued its evening television news service, including Ísland í dag.

In 2026, it was reported that RÚV intends to end terrestrial broadcasting via DVB completely in April 2028.

== List of channels ==
=== Free-to-air channels ===
The following channels are free-to-air via DVB-T2 on terrestrial television, IPTV systems and OTT internet streaming in Iceland.

Channel name	Owner/parent company
RÚV HD	RÚV
RÚV 2 HD	RÚV
Sýn HD	Sýn
Sýn Sport HD^{a}	Sýn

^aOnly free-to-air during selected special events (usually national sports events)

=== Free-to-view channels ===
These channels are free-to-view via managed IPTV systems from Siminn and Vodafone. Some channels provide free OTT internet streaming or via connected TV apps or their website.

Channel name	Owner/parent company
Alþingi	Government of Iceland
Omega Christian television	Omega Kristniboðskirkja
Samstöðin	Alþýðufélagið
Sjónvarp Símans	Síminn
Vísir.is	Sýn

=== Subscription channels ===
Channel name	Owner/parent company
Síminn Sport	Síminn
Síminn Sport 2	Síminn
Síminn Sport 3	Síminn
Síminn Sport 4	Síminn
Sýn Sport	Sýn
Sýn Sport 2	Sýn
Sýn Sport 3	Sýn
Sýn Sport 4	Sýn
Sýn Sport 5	Sýn
Sýn Sport 6	Sýn
Sýn Sport Ísland	Sýn
Sýn Sport Ísland 2	Sýn
Sýn Sport Ísland 3	Sýn
Sýn Sport Ísland 4	Sýn
Sýn Sport Viaplay	Sýn

=== Defunct channels ===
- ÍNN (2007–2017)- Owned and operated by Ingvi Hrafn Jónsson
- iSTV (2014–2014)
- NFS, now a news service providing news for visir.is and television channels of 365
- SkjárEinn - launched in 1999, later bought by Síminn and became Sjónvarp Símans
- Skjár 2 - launched in 2003
- Skjár tveir (-2004) - was meant to be an ad-free channel paid for by the viewers. It didn't go as planned and soon merged with Skjár einn.
- Sýn (1990–2008) - channel launched in 1990, showing sports and other entertainment. Sýn became Stöð 2 Sport in 2008. The original Stöð 2 was rebranded as Sýn in 2025, unrelated to the original channel.
- Stöð 1 (2001)
- Stöð 1 (2010–2010) - launched 29 Oct 2010. A free-to-air entertainment channel. Closed in December the same year.
- Stöð 2 (1986–2025) Iceland's first independent broadcaster, launched in 1986 and branding retired in 2025 in favour of Sýn
- Stöð 3 (1995–1997) - acquired and scrapped by Stöð 2 in 1998, relaunched in 2013
- Stöð 3 (2013–2020) - Icelandic general television channel
- Skjár sport, showed Premier League matches for the seasons 2005–2006 and 2006–2007.
- Stöð 2 Extra (previously called Sirkus) Entertainment channel previously available as free but is now available only as a complement to Stöð 2 subscription
- Stöð 2 eSport - dedicated esports channel
- Stöð 2 Bío - showing films
- Stöð 2 Fjölskylda - children's channel
- Stöð 2 Gull
- Stöð 2 Krakkar
- Nova TV (previously called Sirkus and before that Popp Tíví), music videos – free channel
- Fasteignasjónvarpið, a channel that offers real estate
- Mikligarður, opened 15 March 2014 – closed 1 July 2014. Intended for ages 34+ with an emphasis on females. Programming was all domestic and included paid presentations. Broadcasts was 24/7 and in HD.
- Hringbraut
- N4 (2008–2023) a station which was based in Akureyri with a free-to-view channel.
- PoppTíví (1999–2014) - channel aimed at young people with foreign TV content and music videos, similar to MTV. Operated by Stöð 2
- Tónlist, a non-stop music channel by Sýn.

=== International channels available in Iceland ===
Additional international channels are available in Iceland through Vodafone Iceland and Síminn:

Channels	Owner
NRK1	Norway - NRK
NRK2	Norway - NRK
NRK3	Norway - NRK
SVT1	Sweden - Sveriges Television
SVT2	Sweden - Sveriges Television
DR1	Denmark - DR
DR2	Denmark - DR
KVF	Faroe Islands - Kringvarp Føroya
BBC Nordic	BBC Worldwide
BBC News	BBC Worldwide
Rai 1	Italy – RAI
Rai 2	Italy – RAI
Jim Jam Euro	AMC Networks International UK
Travel Channel	AMC Networks International UK
Food Network	AMC Networks International UK
CBS Reality	AMC Networks International UK
CNN International	Warner Bros. Discovery
Cartoon Network	Warner Bros. Discovery
Boomerang	Warner Bros. Discovery
E!Entertainment	Comcast
CNBC	Comcast
National Geographic Channel	National Geographic Partners
BabyTV	Fox Networks Group
Sky News	Sky Group
Animal Planet	Discovery Networks Northern Europe
Discovery Science	Discovery Networks Northern Europe
History Channel	A+E Networks UK
Discovery Channel	Discovery Networks Northern Europe
ID (Investigation Discovery)	Discovery Networks Northern Europe
TLC	Discovery Networks Northern Europe
LFC TV	Liverpool F.C.
MUTV	Manchester United F.C.
Premier League Channel	UK
TVE Internacional	Spain – RTVE
TVP Polonia	Poland – Telewizja Polska
mezzo	France - Groupe Canal+
Eurosport	Discovery
Eurosport 2	Discovery
Arte	ARTE GEIE, ARTE France, ARTE Deutschland TV GmbH
Prosieben	Germany – ProSiebenSat.1 Media SE
SAT1	Germany – ProSiebenSat.1 Media SE
ZDF	Germany – independent nonprofit institution
ARD	Germany
France 2	France - France Télévisions group
France 24	France – France Médias Monde
M6	France – Groupe M6
Ginx	UK - Ginx TV Limited
MTV 00s	ViacomCBS Networks EMEAA
BOX Hits	UK - The Box Plus Network
Magic	ViacomCBS Networks EMEAA
Disney Channel	The Walt Disney Company
Disney Junior	The Walt Disney Company
Bloomberg	US - Bloomberg L.P.
Fox News	US - Fox Corporation
CCTV-4	China - CCTV
CGTN	China - CCTV
CGTN Documentary	China - CCTV
