= List of Icelandic television series =

The following is a list of television series produced in Iceland:

Upphaf	Lok	Þáttaröð	Sjónvarpsstöð
1966	–	Áramótaskaupið	Ríkissjónvarpið
1966	1966	Í uppnámi	Ríkissjónvarpið
1967	1976	Munir og minjar	Ríkissjónvarpið
1967	1976	Réttur er settur	Ríkissjónvarpið
1967	2004	Nýjasta tækni og vísindi	Ríkissjónvarpið
1967	–	Stundin okkar	Ríkissjónvarpið
1969	1969	Opið hús	Ríkissjónvarpið
1969	2003	Maður er nefndur	Ríkissjónvarpið
1972	1974	Vaka	Ríkissjónvarpið
1974	–	Kastljós	Ríkissjónvarpið
1976	1977	Úr einu í annað	Ríkissjónvarpið
1977	1977	Undir sama þaki	Ríkissjónvarpið
1978	1978	Alþýðufræðsla um efnahagsmál	Ríkissjónvarpið
1978	1978	Nú er nóg komið	Ríkissjónvarpið
1979	1979	Hefur snjóað nýlega	Ríkissjónvarpið
1979	1979	Flugur	Ríkissjónvarpið
1979	1986	Skonrokk	Ríkissjónvarpið
1981	1990	Stiklur	Ríkissjónvarpið
1981	–	Söngvakeppni sjónvarpsins	Ríkissjónvarpið
1982	1982	Þættir úr félagsheimili	Ríkissjónvarpið
1985	1985	Kollgátan	Ríkissjónvarpið
1985	1985	Fastir liðir... eins og venjulega	Ríkissjónvarpið
1986	1987	Heilsubælið í Gervahverfi	Stöð 2
1986		Poppkorn	Ríkissjónvarpið
1986	–	Gettu betur	Ríkissjónvarpið
1987	1995	Á tali hjá Hemma Gunn	Ríkissjónvarpið
1989	2014	Spaugstofan	Ríkissjónvarpið / Stöð 2
1992	1995	Imbakassinn	Stöð 2
1993	1993	Limbó	Ríkissjónvarpið
1993	1993	Þjóð í hlekkjum hugarfarsins	Ríkissjónvarpið
1993	1995	SPK	Ríkissjónvarpið
1993	1998	Dagsljós	Ríkissjónvarpið
1995	1995	Radíus	Ríkissjónvarpið
1997	2001	Fóstbræður	Stöð 2
1999	1999	Nonni Sprengja	Skjár einn
1999	2000	Stutt í spunann	Ríkissjónvarpið
1999	2006	Brúðkaupsþátturinn já	Skjár einn
1999		Út að borða með Íslendingum	Skjár einn
1999		Skotsilfur	Skjár einn
1999		Sílikon	Skjár einn
1999		Menntóþátturinn	Skjár einn
1999		Pétur & Páll	Skjár einn
1999		Tvípunktur	Skjár einn
1999		Bak við tjöldin	Skjár einn
1999		Teikni-leikni	Skjár einn
1999	2000	Axel og félagar	Skjár einn
1999	-	Silfur Egils	Skjár einn / Stöð 2 / RÚV
1999	–	Innlit/Útlit	Skjár einn
2000	2002	Íslensk kjötsúpa	SkjárEinn
2000	2004	Djúpa laugin	Skjár einn
2000	2004	70 mínútur	Popp Tíví
2000	2005	Viltu vinna milljón?	Stöð 2
2000	2000	Gunni og félagar	Skjár einn
2000		Myndastyttur	Skjár einn
2000		2001 nótt	Skjár einn
2000		Mótor	Skjár einn
2000		Adrenalín	Skjár einn
2000		Allt annað	Skjár einn
2000		Björn og félagar	Skjár einn
2000		Rósa	Skjár einn
2000		Samfarir Báru Mahrens	Skjár einn
2001	2002	Sönn íslensk sakamál	Ríkissjónvarpið
2002	2004	Popppunktur	Skjár einn / RÚV
2002	2004	Af fingrum fram	Ríkissjónvarpið
2003	2003	Hljómsveit Íslands	Skjár einn
2003	2004	Svínasúpan	Stöð 2
2003	2005	Idol stjörnuleit	Stöð 2
2003	2007	Út og suður	Ríkissjónvarpið
2003	2015	Sjálfstætt fólk	Stöð 2
2004	2006	Sunnudagsþátturinn	Skjár einn
2004	2014	Latibær	RÚV
2004	–	Game Tíví	Popp Tíví / SkjárEinn
2005	2005	Kallakaffi	Ríkissjónvarpið
2005	2005	Kvöldþátturinn	Sirkus
2005	2005	Sjáumst með Silvíu Nótt	Skjár einn
2005	2006	Strákarnir	Stöð 2
2005	2006	Taka tvö	Ríkissjónvarpið
2005	2014	Stelpurnar	Stöð 2
2005	2008	Allt í drasli	Skjár einn
2006	2006	Búbbarnir	Stöð 2
2006	2006	X-faktor	Stöð 2
2006	2007	Sigtið	SkjárEinn
2006	2007	Venni Páer	SkjárEinn
2006	2007	Dýravinir	SkjárEinn
2006	2007	Meistarinn	Stöð 2
2006	2007	Tekinn	Stöð 2
2006	2008	Kompás	Stöð 2
2006	2014	Latibær	RÚV/Stöð 2
2007	2007	Jón Ólafs	Ríkissjónvarpið
2007	2007	Næturvaktin	Stöð 2
2007	2007	Söngvaskáld	Ríkissjónvarpið
2007	2007	Ertu skarpari en skólakrakki?	SkjárEinn
2007	2008	Laugardagslögin	Ríkissjónvarpið
2007	2012	Pressa	Stöð 2
2007	–	Sunnudagskvöld með Evu Maríu	Ríkissjónvarpið
2007	-	Logi í beinni	Stöð 2 / Sjónvarp Símans
2007	2019	Útsvar	Ríkissjónvarpið
2007	–	07/08 bíó leikhús	Ríkissjónvarpið
2007	–	Kiljan	Ríkissjónvarpið
2008	2008	Svalbarði	SkjárEinn
2008	2008	Mannaveiðar	Ríkissjónvarpið
2008	2012	Algjör Sveppi	Stöð 2
2008	2008	Hæðin	Stöð 2
2008	2008	Dagvaktin	Stöð 2
2008	–	Óli á Hrauni	ÍNN
2008	2008	Ríkið	Stöð 2
2008	2008	Svartir englar	Ríkissjónvarpið
2008	2008	The Singing Bee	SkjárEinn
2009	2011	Auddi og Sveppi	Stöð 2
2009	–	Atvinnumennirnir okkar	Stöð 2
2009	2009	Hamarinn	Ríkissjónvarpið
2009	2016	Réttur	Stöð 2
2009	2009	Fangavaktin	Stöð 2
2010	2010	Ameríski draumurinn	Stöð 2
2010	2010	Hlemma vídeó	Stöð 2
2010	2012	Steindinn okkar	Stöð 2
2010	–	Návígi	Ríkissjónvarpið
2010	2010	Golfskóli Birgirs Leifs	Stöð 2
2010	2010	Hæðin	Stöð 2
2011	2013	Ha?	SkjárEinn
2011	2011	Ljósvakavíkingar	Stöð 2
2011	2017	Spurningabomban	Stöð 2
2011	2011	Grillskóli Jóa Fel	Stöð 2
2011	2011	Heimsendir	Stöð 2
2012	–	Heimsókn	Stöð 2
2012	2012	Veiðin með Gunnari Berden	Stöð 2
2012	2012	Evrópski draumurinn	Stöð 2
2013	2013	Mannshvörf	Stöð 2
2013	2013	Í eldhúsinu hennar Evu	Stöð 2
2013	2013	Bara grín	Stöð 2
2013	2013	Dominoz deildin - Liðið mitt	Stöð 2
2013		Eitthvað annað	Stöð 2
2013	2013	Hið blómlega bú	Stöð 2
2013	2013	Goðsagnir efstu deildar	Stöð 2
2013	2013	Óupplýst Lögreglumál	Stöð 2
2013	2015	Veistu hver ég var?	Stöð 2
2013	2014	Sunnudagsmorgun með Gísla Marteini	Ríkisútvarpið
2013		Tossar	Stöð 2
2014	2016	Ísland Got Talent	Stöð 2
2014	2014	Á fullu Gazi	Stöð 2
2014	2014	Íslenskir Ástríðuglæpir	Stöð 2
2014	2014	Heimur ísdrottningarinnar	Stöð 2
2014	2015	Brestir	Stöð 2
2014	2016	Gulli byggir	Stöð 2
2014	2014	Dulda Ísland	Stöð 2
2014	2015	Heilsugengið	Stöð 2
2014	2014	Eitthvað Annað	Stöð 2
2014	2014	Eldhúsið hans Eyþórs	Stöð 2
2014	2014	Grillsumarið mikla	Stöð 2
2014	2014	Léttir sprettir	Stöð 2
2014	2015	Fókus	Stöð 2
2014	2015	Hreinn Skjöldur	Stöð 2
2015	2016	Þær tvær	Stöð 2
2015	2017	Feðgar á ferð	Stöð 2
2015	2015	Hindurvitni	Stöð 2
2015	2015	Drekasvæðið	Ríkissjónvarpið
2015	2015	Lögreglan	Stöð 2
2015	2015	Jólastjarnan	Stöð 2
2015		Múslimarnir okkar	Stöð 2
2015	–	Vikan með Gísla Marteini	Ríkisútvarpið
2015		Örir Íslendingar – Fullorðnir með ADHD	Stöð 2
2016		Bara geðveik	Stöð 2
2016		Battlað í borginni	Stöð 2
2016	–	Ísskápastríð	Stöð 2
2016	2016	Ghetto betur	Stöð 2
2016	2016	Augnablik úr 50 ára sögu sjónvarps	Ríkissjónvarpið
2016	2016	Sjónvarp í 50 ár	Ríkissjónvarpið
2017	2018	Steypustöðin	Stöð 2
2017	2017	Asíski draumurinn	Stöð 2
2017		Hvar er best að búa? sería 1	Stöð 2
2017		Snapparar	Stöð 2
2018		Nýja Ísland – Helvítis fokking fokk	Stöð 2
2018		Nýja Ísland – Túristinn blessaði Ísland	Stöð 2
2018	2018	Suður-ameríksi draumurinn	Stöð 2
2019	2019	Góðir landsmenn	Stöð 2
2019	2019	Kappsmál	Ríkisútvarpið
2019	–	Föstudagskvöld með Gumma Ben	Stöð 2
2019		Hvar er best að búa? sería 2	Stöð 2
2019		Viltu í alvöru deyja?	Stöð 2
2020	2020	Steinda Con	Stöð 2
2020	2020	Sápan	Stöð 2
2020	2020	Eurogarðurinn	Stöð 2
2021		Kjötætur óskast! Vegan með Lóu Pind	Stöð 2
2021	2021	Vegferð	Stöð 2
