= Digital on-screen graphics by country =

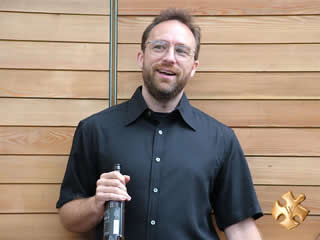
Example of a digital on-screen graphic

Digital on-screen graphics by country are the varying logos and differences of digital on-screen graphics in different countries and regions.

== Overview ==
Digital on-screen graphics (DOGs; also called a digitally originated graphic, bug, network bug, on-screen bug, or screenbug) are almost always placed in one of four corners: the top left, the top right, the bottom left, or the bottom right. There are few exceptions to this rule: most notably, Saturday! in Russia, which places their DOG in the top center.

Many news broadcasters, as well as a few television networks, also place a clock alongside their bug. In the United States, Canada, Australia, and New Zealand, DOGs may also include the show's parental guideline rating. In Australia, this is known as a Program Return Graphic (PRG). It has become common to place text above the station's logo advertising other programs on the network.

In many countries, some TV networks insert the word "live" near the DOG to advise viewers that the program is live, rather than pre-recorded. During televised sports events, a DOG may also display game-related statistics such as the current score. This has led people in Canada and the United States to refer to such a DOG as a score bug.

In many countries, DOGs are removed in non-program sections such as commercials and program trailers, but TV channels in some other countries have retained in full color or instead replaced them in either of these sections or in both sections (like Turkey, Indonesia, Italy, the entirety of South Asia, Vietnam, Taiwan, and Russia).

== MENA ==
=== Arab world ===
Arabic TV logos are placed in the top-right and top-left except for Al-Jazeera, whose logo appears on the bottom-right of the screen. Some Arabian TV stations hide their logos during commercial breaks and promos/trailers, such as Dubai TV, Dubai One, Funoon, the Egyptian CBC and Nile TV networks, ART Hekayat, ART Hekayat 2, Iqraa, and Al-Jazeera.

Abu Dhabi TV and MBC1 initially had their logos at the bottom-right corner from their launch until the mid-2000s, when they were moved to the top-right corner.

=== Iran ===
Iranian broadcaster IRIB introduced DOGs in early 2000s. Unlike other Middle Eastern nations that introduced DOGs on their TV networks in 1990s, Iran was very late in this practice. Almost all Iranian TV channels display DOGs at top-left corner of the screen. The few exception is IRIB-owned channels remove DOGs during news broadcasts.

=== Israel ===
In Israel, Television DOGs were first introduced in 1991. Israeli channel watermarks most often appear on the top left or the top right corner since Israeli cable and satellite-based services often have the channel description and programming (OSD) on the bottom of the screen. Most channels have an opaque, full-color watermark, though exceptions exist, for example Channel 9, which displays a blue-tinted semi-transparent logo. In ad breaks, it is required to replace the channel watermark with another symbol – sometimes on the other edge of the screen – indicating there are ads at the moment.

The Israel Broadcasting Authority, whose channels placed their logos in the top left corner, ceased broadcasting in May 2017. The new public broadcaster, the Israeli Public Broadcasting Corporation, displays its logos at the top right instead. The erstwhile Channel 2 as well as its successors, Keshet 12 and Reshet 13, also use the top right corner. However, Channel 10 used the top left corner before rebranding to Eser (Literally "Ten") in 2017 and simultaneously moving its logo to the top right (Not long after, in January 2019, it ceased broadcasting as it merged with Reshet 13). Channel 14 as well as its predecessor Channel 20 use the top right corner as well. The Knesset Channel, however, uses the top left corner.

=== Morocco ===
The SNRT and 2M And Al-Aoula Uses permanent on-screen DOGs for their TV channels. In contrast, other channels such as Medi 1 TV hide their DOGs during commercial breaks.

== Asia ==
=== Brunei ===
Radio Television Brunei introduced DOGs in 1994. Like TV channels from neighbouring Malaysia, all DOGs are removed during advertisement breaks.

=== Cambodia ===
Cambodian TV channels introduced DOGs in 1995. Like Thailand, all logos are full-color and displayed on the top-right corner of the screen. Some channels such as TV5 hide their logos during commercial breaks. Hang Meas HDTV Logo on the top-left corner of the screen, CTN (Cambodian Television Network), MyTV, Bayon TV, PNN, Logo on the top-right corner of the screen.

=== China ===
TV stations in mainland China always place their logo (usually semi-transparent and sometimes animated) in the top-left corner of the screen in full-color or grey-scale. Regardless of the content being broadcast (program or advertisements), some channels like Phoenix Television hide their logos during commercial breaks; although in some rare cases, the DOG may be placed elsewhere to avoid covering the score bug during the broadcast of a sporting event.

China introduced logos in 1983 on the bottom-left corner of the screen, but they were used only during commercial breaks and clock idents. Later China Central Television (CCTV) introduced permanent DOGs for all programs in 1992, on the top-left corner of the screen. China also displays a clock on top-right corner of the screen for 1 minute between 59:30–00:30 & 29:30–30:30 time in transition between programs.

=== Hong Kong ===
Hong Kong TV introduced DOGs in 1994. Hong Kong DOGs can be either of full color or semi-transparent and (except for RTHK 31) always be hidden during commercial breaks. Television Broadcasts Limited (TVB) placed their logos at the top-right corner of the screen while now-defunct Asia Television and other channels placed their logos at the top-left corner of the screen. Sometimes, weather information, date, and time clocks had been used alongside DOGs in news programs, continuity & live broadcasts.

=== India ===
The first on-screen logo in India was introduced in 1984 by DD2 Metro (now DD News). It was white and slightly transparent.

All Indian TV channels have on-screen logos. They are always full-colors, never transparent, and they are almost never removed during commercial breaks (though the channels of the South Indian Sun TV Network did so until 2015).

The great majority of Indian TV channels place their logos in the top right corner of the screen, though there are exceptions. The corner used may be broadcaster-dependent. Among the big national broadcasters:

- Channels from the Sony network always use the top right corner, without exception.
- Star channels also use the top right, with the exception of National Geographic and Nat Geo Wild, which use the top left corner in line with their international counterparts. Past exceptions include The History Channel, whose logo was placed in the top left until it rebranded to Fox History & Entertainment in 2008; the now-defunct Channel V, which used the top left between 2013 and 2016; and Nat Geo People, Nat Geo Music and BabyTV, were withdrawn from India in June 2019.
- TV18 and Viacom18 channels use the top right corner as well, with the exceptions of regional-language movie channels (e.g., Colors Kannada Cinema and Colors Gujarati Cinema) as well as Colors Super, which have shown their logos at the top left corner since 2018; and VH1, which has always used the bottom right corner. Also, CNBC-TV18, CNBC Awaaz and CNBC Bajar use the bottom right. Moreover, MTV showed its logo in the top left corner until 23 April 2018, when it was moved to the top right (its HD version, launched in 2017, has always used the top right).
- Unlike most other major networks, the Zee Network's non-news channels containing 'Zee' in their name display their logos at the top left corner and not the top right. This has been the case since 15 October 2017, when almost all the Zee-branded TV channels of the Zee network rebranded with a new logo and, in many cases, a new graphics package and look. Before then, the logos were shown at the top right, as with other broadcasters. (News channels' logos—i.e., logos of channels owned by Zee Media Corporation—stayed put at the top right corner, with the exception of WION, which uses the bottom left.) All the major Zee-branded channels—such as Zee TV, Zee Cinema, Zee Café and the regional-language channels like Zee Tamil, Zee Telugu, Zee Marathi and Zee Bangla—show their logos at the top left; moreover, the Odia-language channel Sarthak TV rebranded to Zee Sarthak and moved its logo to the top left.
- Among the Zee channels not containing the word 'Zee' that moved their logos to the top left during the big rebrand in 2017 was English movie channel Zee Studio; when it was renamed to &flix on 3 June 2018, the logo remained at the top left. Moreover, Hindi movie channel &pictures has always shown its logo at the top left since its launch in 2013. However, &privé HD, Zee's other English movie channel, and Hindi entertainment channel &TV place their logos at the top right corner. Other Zee channels not containing the word 'Zee', such as Zing and Living Foodz, use the top right corner.
- In stark contrast to the national broadcasters, the channels of major South Indian broadcaster Sun TV Network have always shown their logo at the bottom right corner, without exception. Furthermore, the Tamil-language Jaya and Kalaignar networks always show their logos at the bottom left corner, as opposed to Sun's bottom right.

=== Indonesia ===
Indonesian television DOGs have been occasionally used since 1982. At that time, TVRI was Indonesia's only television channel. When RCTI began broadcasting in 1989, the DOG began to be used at the same time.

Today, in most national networks, the logo usually appears in the top-right hand corner. Some networks placed their logo in the top-left hand corner, such as networks owned by Media Nusantara Citra (e.g. RCTI, MNCTV, GTV, and iNews). Only a few of them – most are news networks – displayed their logo in either the bottom-right hand corner (e.g. Metro TV and CNN Indonesia) or the bottom-left hand corner (e.g. BeritaSatu until 2022, CNBC Indonesia, and Nusantara TV). The DOGs of local stations differ by each station, either in the top-right hand or the top-left hand corners.

Most of the networks/stations had their DOGs placed on-screen in color. Few appeared in a transparent format, such as NET. (from their first broadcast in 2013 until 8 June 2023), ANTV (from 20 July 2012 until 24 March 2018) and TVRI (since 2019). Trans TV was the first to place its transparent logo from 2002 until 2013, when its logo changed. Some DOGs featured a moving element, with most channels using a glinting effect.

There have been times when the network had moved their DOGs to the other part of the screen. TVRI was the first to move theirs to the bottom-right hand corner in 1999 (the year the network changed its logo, used until 2001 when the new logo moved to upper-right), followed by RCTI in 2000 (the year network changed its logo when the new logo moved to upper-left), ANteve in 2003 (the year network changed its name to ANTV when the new logo moved to upper-right), TV7 in 2006 (when the network rebranded to Trans 7), Metro TV in 2010 (the year network changed its logo when the new logo moved to bottom-right hand corner), iNews TV (former name of iNews) at the end of 2016, when the logo moved to upper-left hand corner, Nusantara TV in mid-2024, when the logo moved to bottom-left hand corner, and Indosiar in 2025, when the logo moved to upper-right hand corner. TVRI, RCTI, SCTV and TPI (currently MNCTV), while using the text logo at the start of their broadcast, did not begin to use their own logo on the screen until the end of 1990 for RCTI and SCTV, 1995 for TPI, and 1996 for TVRI.

Unlike neighboring countries, since the mid-2000s, most networks/channels never leave their DOGs during commercial breaks, instead the logo becomes transparent or tinted light grey (before the mid-2000s most networks/channels DOGs were removed during commercial breaks/sponsor bug appears during program shows). Trans TV was the first TV channel that never leave its logo during commercial breaks, doing so in 2002, followed by Lativi in 2003, SCTV, TV7 and other networks in 2004, the practice later followed by other networks as well as local channels. For the station identification, the logo will remain on-screen, but sometimes it will disappear prior to that. However, not all (mainly local or pay) TV channels followed, as many of them were done by retaining it in full color or removing it during commercials.

Some networks/channels always show their logo in color even in the breaks, such as TVRI and its owned channels (TVRI Kanal 3 and TVRI Sport, until its massive rebranding in 2019), ANTV (from 2004 until mid 2005), Lativi (currently tvOne, from 2003 until mid-2010), Global TV (former name of GTV) during relays of MTV programs simultaneously (from 2002 until 2005), B Channel (former name of RTV, from 2009 until 2012), and most local TV channels (some exceptions are channels of Indonesia Network). TVRI also mixed usage of retaining and removing on-air bugs for some advertisements from 2004 until the end of 2009. Some Indonesian TV networks/channels, such as ANTV (sometime in 2005), Indosiar (from the end of 2005 to its DOGs change in March 2007), tvOne (from late 2010 to its logo change in February 2011) always used transparent logos with colors. Since 2011, when on air, tvOne bugs are still animated, although its DOGs become transparent during commercial breaks.

Since 2011, most networks started to display additional contents on their programming that disappear during commercial breaks, such as content rating classifications and, in some networks since 2013, the name of the current program.

=== Japan ===
On all Japanese network television key stations and their affiliates, DOGs appear on the top-right hand corner of the screen. In addition, during some programs, a digital clock appears on the top-left corner of the screen. The digital clock had been in place on most programs prior to the introduction of DOGs; the first DOGs were introduced in 1996 by now-defunct pay-TV channel CS Nittele, and the NHK's satellite services introduced it later in 1998, before expanding to terrestrial television with the start of digital broadcasting in that country between 2003 and 2006.

=== Kazakhstan ===
Television stations in Kazakhstan introduced DOGs in the mid-1990s. Kazakh DOGs are mostly opaque, full-color and sometimes animated. Most of Kazakh DOGs are placed in either the top or bottom corner of the screen.

=== Malaysia ===
Malaysian TV channels started using on-screen logos occasionally since early 1980s, but at that time, only the two channels of RTM used this and TV3 would appear only in 1995 after the television station moved to the current office at Sri Pentas. The logo that RTM used in TV stations became permanent in 1991 with Malaysian flag that was up to use for 13 years. TV3 logo usually appears on the top-right hand of the screen corner, except for 8TV owned by Media Prima, on the top-left and Bernama TV, without DOG (it was used to appear in neither top-left nor top-right but in the bottom-left).

On-screen appearance of Malaysian television stations also includes current program showing (used to only appear during the start of the programme and after each commercial break, but this has since changed to appear during the whole duration of the program and removed during commercial breaks). Logos of television channels are mainly in color, but in some channels (such as almost all Astro-branded channels) the logo used may be transparent and/or white, while NTV7 used transparent logo for several years before Media Prima's acquisition and later, it changed to colour but toned down before turning into full-color. In foreign television channels on Unifi TV and Astro, the channel logos are almost never removed during breaks, but during replaced promos, the logo is removed (although some channels removed the logo in the same way as locally operated channels).

=== Mongolia ===
Mongolian TV introduced DOGs in the early 2000s. This makes Mongolia the latest East Asian country to introduce DOGs. MNB displays their logo on top-left corner of the screen while private channels place their logos on top-right corner of the screen.

=== Myanmar (Burma) ===
Burmese TV introduced DOGs for all programs since 2003. However, usage of DOGs dates back to 1998, but displayed only for a short time. All Burmese DOGs are full-color and always displayed on top-right corner of the screen.

=== Nepal ===
Nepali television channels introduced DOGs in the mid-1990s. Like all South Asian countries including its neighbor India, all Nepali DOGs are full-color, opaque and never transparent. They are displayed permanently on either top-left or top-right corner of the screen, even commercial breaks or end of transmissions.

=== North Korea ===
Mansudae Television, Ryongnamsan Television and Sports Television all have their bugs in the top right hand corner of the screen, conventional for East Asian stations. Korean Central Television – the largest, main TV station in the DPRK – did not air any on-screen graphic until at least 1994; since then, the bug has been placed in the top left hand corner of the screen, making it an anomaly.

Unlike the neighboring South Korea, the bugs are not removed during non-program sections.

=== Philippines ===
ABC first introduced DOGs during its first broadcast in 1992, while the People's Television Network, GMA Network, Radio Philippines Network and the Intercontinental Broadcasting Corporation first introduced DOGs in 1995 and 1998 respectively, as the Movie and Television Review and Classification Board had implemented a television content rating system from November that year. Most stations do not display DOGs during commercial breaks, except Net 25, RPTV, ETC (now SolarFlix; since 2012), UNTV, and some cable channels, which display DOGs all the time. The DOGs can most often be seen in the upper-right corner, aligned with the TV content rating logo, but on several cable channels, they are placed in the upper-left or bottom-right corners. Formerly, ABS-CBN removed the DOG and rating 3 minutes before commercial breaks, however from 2000 these are now removed 10 seconds beforehand. ABS-CBN, RPN and GMA previously did not use DOGs during their newscasts but started doing so in August 2011 for GMA and May 2012 for ABS-CBN. ABS-CBN and its sister channel S+A, and its replacement, Kapamilya Channel append the word HD to their respective HD feeds' DOGs and place the DOGs outside the 4:3 safe zone.

Satellite pay-TV provider Cignal also appends its DOG to most of the channels it carries. Hence, those who view channels through Cignal will see its DOG.

The network logo and the MTRCB rating of the program (green 'G', blue 'PG' and red 'SPG') are shown 1 to 5 seconds after the start of the program. Hashtags, promotions and announcements are also shown in the middle of the program. All DOGs appear in a solid color.

=== Singapore ===
Singaporean television channels began showing the channel logos during television programs in 1994. The first one was Channel 5, then Channel 12 and lastly Channel 8. The television stations show the logo in full-color, and are usually shown in the top right of the screen. Also, since around 2004, logos of Mediacorp television channels also include the parent company's logo, and this expanded in 2005, when Channel U became a part of Mediacorp.

From 2004 to 2023 (2005 to 2023 for Channel U), Mediacorp, the sole free-to-air broadcaster of Singapore and effectively the state broadcaster, shows its on-screen logos in two parts: a transparent Mediacorp wordmark appears immediately above the channel logo in full color. The channel logos are almost always in the top right, with the exception of CNA (previously Channel NewsAsia), which uses the bottom left with a news ticker. Even with CNA, the Mediacorp wordmark remains at the top right corner.

With the changed logos for Mediacorp channels from 2023 onwards, the Mediacorp wordmark has been removed as nearly all logos (except CNA, which uses a Mediacorp "M" icon in a circle as its wordmark) have an "M" wordmark in a circle beside its current logos, which corresponds with the logo's colour as well.

Like its neighbouring country, Malaysia, Singaporean channels remove the channel logos during commercial breaks; except for CNA, whose DOG is integrated into the ticker which remains on the screen during breaks.

=== South Korea ===
South Korean national broadcaster Korean Broadcasting System (KBS) introduced DOGs for all programmes in 2001, followed by Munhwa Broadcasting Corporation (MBC) and Seoul Broadcasting System (SBS) a year later. However, the usage of DOGs dated back to 1986 but only for news programming. Some cable TV channels started using DOGs earlier than these channels, such as music channel KMTV introduced DOGs in 1995 and now-defunct two satellite channels under the name "KBS Wiseong" in 1997. Most of South Korean TV channels place their logo at top-right corner of the screen and removed during ad breaks.

=== Sri Lanka ===
Sri Lankan TV introduced DOGs in 1996 after they began satellite broadcasting. All Sri Lankan DOGs are full-color. Especially with Rupavahini, the logo appears on the top-left of the screen.

=== Taiwan ===
Many cable TV & some terrestrial channels in Taiwan introduced DOGs in the 1990s, with Chinese Television System & China Television introduced DOGs for some programs since 1994. Sanlih E-Television was the first cable and overall TV station to introduce DOGs in 1995. Later, Formosa Television became the first Taiwanese TV channel to introduced DOGs permanently when it start broadcasting in 1997. Taiwan Television did not introduce DOGs until 1999 when all of 3 stations (TTV, CTV & CTS) began to use DOGs on all of their programmes. Most of DOGs in Taiwanese TV channels are in colour or opaque and placed permanently without any removing during commercial breaks, except Sanlih-E Television that have logos removed during ad breaks.

Prior to introduction of DOGs, Taiwanese TV stations displayed 24-hour digital clocks at the top corner of screen beginning in the early 1980s. Japan had a similar practice, but used 12-hour digital clock without seconds.

=== Thailand ===
Thailand introduced DOGs in 1991. Thai TV logos are in full-color (with the exception of ITV/Thai PBS that used transparent logos from 2003 to 2014), and DOGs are not seen during commercial breaks, trade test transmissions, transitions between programs and when a Thai Royal Family member is shown during a broadcast. All Thai-based television stations show the logos in the top-right of the screen since 2003 (the logos sometimes used to be shown in its bottom-right corner).

During 2006 & 2014 coups, all Thai DOGs were removed from TV channels during the live speech of the military junta leaders.

During the mourning period after the death of Bhumibol Adulyadej, all television stations aired black-and-white, monochrome DOGs and showed the logo on the bottom-right of the screen for a period of a hundred days until 21 January 2017. After the period ended, all television stations reverted DOGs back to the regular colour scheme but remained on showing the logo on the bottom-right of the screen (except during foreign sports programming and some foreign series and domestic sports programming on some channels, when television stations still show the logos on the top-right corner of the screen).

=== Turkey ===
In Turkey, screen graphics, bugs, or DOGs are known as screen badges. On analogue/digital television, screen badges were introduced to TRT1 in 1996 and some private channels had screen badges beginning in the mid-1990s. Beginning on New Year's Day 2000, all television channels at the time had screen badges usually located in the top right hand of the screen. However, on 1 January 2010, One got a new theme package and the screen badge was moved down to the bottom right hand of the screen. All of the TRT channels' screen badges were on the bottom right of the screen by the end of 2010.

Commercial TV channels usually place their logos in the top left corner of the screen: among the larger channels Kanal D, Show TV, Fox (now known as NOW) and ATV use the top left, but Star TV uses the top right. A similar situation exists in Turkey's neighbour Greece, where most TV channels use the top left corner (including Star Channel, which is not related to its Turkish or Indian namesakes), with only Skai TV using the top right.

The badges are either simplified or transparent during commercial breaks.

=== Turkmenistan ===
Turkmen TV introduced DOGs in late 1990s. All of Turkmen DOGs are full-colour, opaque and displayed on the bottom-left of the screen.

Before the late 2000s, there was a golden head appeared on upper right.

=== Vietnam ===
Vietnamese TV channels started showing their DOGs in 1995. Logos are not removed during commercial breaks, but remain in full-color, unlike their national counterparts in Indonesia (but note the local ones). Free-to-air channels of VTV have the logo on the top-left, while similar channels operated by HTV have the logo on the top-right. Since 2013, stations (notably those owned by VTV) began to display a digital clock and the program name at all times. Before that, the digital clock was only displayed in the morning. On the other hand, cable channels show both its provider's logo and its logo. For example, VTVcab's channels have the logo of the cable provider (VTVcab) on the bottom-left, and the channel logo on the top-right. Most local and international channels had their logos located in the top-right, while some like K+ and VTVcab channels had their channel bugs shown in the bottom-left.

== Europe ==
=== Austria ===
ORF, the Austrian public broadcasting agency, introduced digital on-screen graphics in 1992 on both television channels operated back then. Before, only the abbreviation "ORF" was shown randomly for several minutes during the programming in the top right corner of the screen, styled in a simple white sans-serif typeface. Nowadays, all Austrian television channels, both public and private, are required by law to display a digital on-screen graphic continuously to enable channel identification. However, during commercial and continuity breaks, it is forbidden to show digital on-screen graphics, to allow a further distinction between paid commercials or station announcements and programming content.

The position on the screen varies between the top left and the top right corner: for instance, public broadcaster ORF shows the digital on-screen graphics on ORF1 (first channel) in the top left corner, on ORF 2 (second channel) in the top right corner and on ORF III (third channel) again in the top left corner. Commercial broadcaster ATV places the graphic in the top right corner on its main channel and in the top left corner on its additional channel ATV II. Most other commercial channels, such as Puls 4, show their digital on-screen graphics in the top right corner of the screen.

=== Belarus ===
In Belarus, digital on-screen graphics were introduced in 1992. Until 1997, national television station Belarus-1 showed their digital on-screen graphics in the bottom right corner of the screen. It was originally just text saying "ТБК", with the Б being red and the Т and К being white. In 1996, this changed to a semi-transparent black box with white text saying "БТ" in it. In 1997, the digital on-screen graphics for Belarus-1 was moved to the top left corner of the screen, with the digital on-screen graphics now being in colour again for the first time since 1996. In 2011, the digital on-screen graphic moved to the top right corner, where it stays currently.

Similar to neighboring Latvia and Poland but unlike Russia and Ukraine, some Belarusian TV channels remove their DOGs during advertisement breaks, but, unlike the first two, keep their DOGs during programme trailers.

=== Belgium ===
Dutch-language Belgian channels (i.e., those operating in Flanders) place their logo bugs at the top left corner, much like their counterparts in the Netherlands. Examples are the public broadcaster in Flanders, VRT, and the Flemish commercial broadcasters, DPG Media and De Vijver Media.

However, French-language Belgian channels (i.e., those operating in Wallonia), such as public broadcaster RTBF and commercial broadcaster RTL-TVI, use the bottom right corner of the screen, in contrast to French-language TV channels in France, Switzerland, etc., which use the top right or left corner.

=== Czech Republic (Czechia) ===
Almost all Czech (and Slovak) TV channels place their logos in the top left corner of the screen, irrespective of the broadcasting network. The public television broadcaster Česká televize and the major commercial TV broadcasters (TV Nova, FTV Prima and TV Barrandov) all place their logos in the top left corner, as do many pay channels from pan-European broadcasters (though some use the top right). This is also the case with Slovak TV channels, some of which are broadcast in the Czech Republic.

The only exceptions from the major local broadcasters are the Nova Sport channels (Nova Sport 1 and 2, SD and HD), which place their logos in the top right corner instead of the usual top left, since score graphics for many sports use the top left corner and the public news broadcaster ČT24 between 2007 and 2010, where placed their logo in the bottom left corner.

=== Denmark ===
Unlike Scandinavian neighbours Norway and Sweden, which almost exclusively use the top right corner for their DOGs, TV channels in Denmark may use either the top left corner or the top right for their DOGs. The public broadcaster DR and the state-owned commercial broadcaster TV 2 display their logos at the top left, as does commercial broadcaster Discovery with its TV channels such as Kanal 4 and Kanal 5. However, TV3 and other Viasat channels owned by Viaplay Group (formerly part of Modern Times Group) display their logos at the top right.

=== Finland ===
Nelonen was the first channel in Finland to use a DOG from its launch in June 1997. MTV3 started to use a DOG in the beginning of 1998, and Yle introduced DOGs in its two channels in August 1998.

Public broadcaster Yle moved its logos from the top right corner to the top left when it rebranded on 5 March 2012. However, the commercial TV channels, like MTV3 and Nelonen, place their logos at the top right. This is exactly the opposite of what is seen with the Netherlands, where the public broadcasting consortium NPO places its logo bug at the top right, but the main commercial broadcasters use the top left.

Most logos on free channels are small, white or gray and opaque, but some have colours such as National Geographic (Disney) and TLC (WBD).

=== France ===
La Cinq was the first channel in France to use the DOG when it launched in February 1986; it remained on the bottom-right corner until the channel ceased operations in April 1992. After the first private channels launched between 1986 and 1990, DOGs began to be used on the public television channels operated by France Télévisions and TF1, where they were placed on the top right corner.

Currently, the public TV broadcaster France Télévisions, as well as the majority of French commercial TV stations (such as the TF1 and M6 networks), display their logos at the top right corner of the screen. However, some channels, such as Franco-German cultural channel Arte, use the top left corner. During programming blocks aimed at children, TF1, TFX and international channel TV5Monde uses another DOG.

=== Germany ===
In the 1980s, public broadcasters started to randomly show logos during programs to prevent video piracy, following the lead of Italian broadcasters RAI and Canale 5. After the first private stations emerged in 1984, permanently showing their logo most times, the public broadcasters soon followed. Today practically all TV stations show their logo during the programs and often these are an integral part of their design using fluent motion graphic animations to make the transition between programmes, previews and advertising, as well as displaying additional information such as teletext numbers or the name of the following programme. Most logos are transparent during programming though some channels do not. (For instance, kabel eins uses a bright orange-coloured logo.)

TV channels generally may show their logos at the top left or top right of the screen, depending on the network. Public broadcaster ARD's national channels display logo watermarks at the top right corner, but the individual regional broadcasting organizations' TV channels may show their logos at either the top left or the top right (for instance, BR and HR's TV channels use the top left for their logos, but MDR Fernsehen and RBB Fernsehen use the top right). Commercial network ProSiebenSat.1 Media, like ARD, uses the top right corner for all its channels, such as ProSieben, Sat.1, kabel eins and sixx. (However, Sat.1 used the top left corner until 2001, and again between 2008 and 2009.) But secondary public broadcaster ZDF and commercial broadcaster Mediengruppe RTL Deutschland use the top left corner for their channels, such as ZDF, RTL or VOX (exceptions in RTL's case are youth-oriented commercial channel RTL Zwei and news channel n-tv, whose logos are displayed at neither the top left nor the top right but the bottom right). News channel Welt (formerly N24) does not use any of these corners for its logo: its logo is placed in the bottom left corner. Another channel using this corner is documentary and parliament channel Phoenix, which moved its logo from the top left to the bottom left during its June 2018 rebrand.

Channels (except Phoenix) that are collaborations between ARD and ZDF (e.g., KiKa), or between ARD, ZDF and foreign broadcasters (e.g., Arte, a collaboration with France Télévisions, and 3sat, a collaboration with SRG SSR and ORF), use the top left corner.

=== Greece ===
On all Greek network television networks (including Greek versions of foreign channels), DOGs appear on the top left corner of the screen. This had been the case until the rebranding of Skai TV in October 2018, which saw its DOG being moved to top-right. Since 1997, almost all television stations in Greece (except for Cosmote TV-exclusive channels, which are operated by OTE) keep their logos on the screen during advertisements, although in channels such as Skai TV the logo became transparent prior to the 2018 logo change.

=== Hungary ===
Hungarian DOGs were first introduced in MTV's channel M2 from 1989, but they were very rare until 1991. M2 was the first network to always display its DOG, which was a quarter-circle (which was bright and noticeable). It first showed up in 1992 but it changed in 1994 due to logo change. This was followed by many broadcasters and TV channels.

Most DOGs are semi-transparent (either in color or grayscale), but some including Hír TV, PRIME, Viasat 3 and their sister channel Viasat 6, and the long-defunct TV3 have opaque, color DOGs.

By and large, the corner used by the logo of a TV channel depends on the network. Public broadcaster Magyar Televízió moved its channels' logos from the top right corner to the top left during its 2012 corporate rebrand, much like Yle in Finland, which also rebranded in that year, and their logos had changed from color to gray-scale beginning in March 2015. MTV's thematic TV channel, M4 Sport, due to it being a sports channel, shows its logo in the top right corner.

RTL Hungary's channels, such as RTL Klub, RTL II, Cool TV and Film+, have always placed their logos in the top left corner. Since 2021, RTL Klub hide the rainbow flag in the left side of the logo during Pride Month events.

TV2 Csoport's channels, such as TV2, SuperTV2 and FEM3, have always used the top right.

Age ratings have been included since 17 October 2002 onwards at the bottom of the screen as well as before the start of the program, but some channels dislike the requirement and use a different age rating system instead (mostly the Romanian ones, like the DIGI's educational channels, RTL (previously), and the independent TV2's sister channels) or none at all. Since July 2021, channels are required to depict the age rating 'circles' even during advertisements (the same for a single package, decided by the highest rated ad, e.g. if a commercial of a sexual medicine is being aired, the whole pack receives 18+ ratings and should be broadcast between 21:00 and 05:00 local time). This rule is in connection to the so-called 'anti-pedophile', according to its many critics, anti-LGBT law.

Many channels hide their logos in commercial breaks, such as the RTL network's channels, but some such as the independent TV2 and its sister channels include them during ads.

Hungarian version of Comedy Central and Hungarian-voice simulcast of the sports network Eurosport 2 are the only channels which have used all of their four corners of the screen during their lifetime, depicting their bugs. At the humor channel it's due to the rebrands, while at the latter, it's because of the urge not to cover the graphics of the licensed broadcasts like Bundesliga (top left corner until 2018 when licenses had moved to Sport TV), FIS Ski Jumping World Cup (usually top left corner) or PGA golf events (bottom left or bottom right corner, even online). However, Eurosport 2 has been using originally the top right corner to its DOG.

During the lifetime of the now-defunct Hálózat TV (Hungarian for Network Television), while the original 24-hour cable channel placed their DOG in the top left corner, local (mainly free-to-air) television stations being subscripted to the evening programming, mainly the news and one or two pieces of movies, put the channel's own logo into the top right corner. Hálózat used bottom-left for ratings which isn't common in Hungary, even nowadays. Hálózat TV ceased broadcasting by January 2013.

=== Iceland ===
All Icelandic TV channels, such as RÚV, Sýn (previously Stöð 2) and the now-defunct Stöð 3, place their transparent logo bugs in the top right corner of the TV screen, often with an 888 bug for subtitles.

=== Ireland ===
The Gaelic-language channel TnaG first used their bug during simulcast of QVC and their coverage of the Oireachtas (Irish Parliament). In 1998 TV3 launch as Ireland's first commercial operator and the first Irish channel to permanently use a bug in the bottom right hand corner of the screen. In 1999, TnaG re-branded as TG4 and began showing their logo during all programs. In 2002 RTÉ introduced their bug however it would only appear for twenty seconds at the beginning of each show and it was there to classify the suitability of the content of the show, in September 2003 the bug became a permanent part of the on-screen presentation for both RTÉ One and Network 2. RTÉ's classification guide also appears for twenty seconds at the beginning of each show.

Unlike British TV channels, which generally display their logo bugs at the top left corner of the screen, TV channel logo bugs in Ireland generally appear in the top right, however, from 2003 until 2006, RTÉ displayed the logo bugs in the top left corner. For RTÉ, TG4 and Setanta Ireland, the logo bugs appear in the top right corner of the screen. TV3's bugs appeared in the bottom right hand corner of the screen between the early 2000s and its rebrand in 2009; TV3 then moved its logo bug to the top right corner to match the other Irish channels around 2014, and it has stayed there ever since, even after the channel's rebranding as Virgin Media One in August 2018. RTÉ does not use their bug during news or current affairs programming. The now-defunct Channel 6 also displayed a bug during its two years on the air. The new digital services from RTÉ also display bugs on RTÉjr, RTÉ Two HD and RTÉ One+1.

Bugs are also used to tell viewers when shows are live or when they are replays. RTÉ use the word "replay" during repeats of live programming while TV3 advised viewers "Text & Comment Lines are Closed", Setanta replaced the country "Ireland" with the word "live" to advise viewers that they are watching live events rather than repeats and TG4 places the Gaelic word "beo" (live) below the number '4' in their logo during live programming. RTÉ refer to DOGs as "bugs". In Northern Ireland UTV began displaying their bug in the late 2000s. All of the community and local channels in Ireland display a bug. All bugs also display 888 for subtitles.

In March 2020, a lockdown was imposed by the government in response to the COVID-19 pandemic. All bugs were updated on RTÉ and Virgin Media channels to include "Stay at Home" beside each channel's logo.

=== Italy ===
In Italy, the channel watermark usage is different for every television network. RAI, at the end of the 1970s, introduced its first watermark, to minimize copyright infringement by private channels. The bug "jumped" around the four corners of the image. At the end of 1987, the bug added the number of the station, until 2010 in words and from 2010 in numbers. RAI's on-screen logos are not shown during news programs (e.g. TG1).

RAI's on-screen logos were placed at the bottom right until 2010, much like commercial broadcaster Mediaset and commercial TV channel La7, which have always used that corner. However, during RAI's 2010 corporate rebrand, they were moved to the top right corner. During a second corporate rebrand in 2016, the logos were moved once again, this time to the top left (with some programs having the logo on the top right corner), which has rarely been used by Italian TV networks (barring some newer channels such as Discovery's Nove). On the SD feeds of RAI channels that have an HD feed, the HD channel number (starting from 501) is posted below the channel's bug. Sky Italia channels, like TV8, use the top right corner for their logos.

Commercial broadcasters Mediaset and La7 have always placed their logos at the bottom right corner of the screen. However, during some shows or sport events, they may be moved to the top right. Mediaset's DOGs consist of a transparent channel logo with 'MEDIASET' written immediately below the logo. (Mediacorp, the sole free-to-air broadcaster of Singapore and effectively the state broadcaster, follows a similar approach: a transparent Mediacorp wordmark appears immediately above the channel logo in full colour. This was used from 2004 till 2023, before Mediacorp refreshes all of its properties logos. Note that Mediacorp, unlike Mediaset, places its logos at the top right corner, and has the channel logo in full color.)

DOGs are not removed during commercial breaks, with an exception of some channels like the now-defunct linear channel Disney Channel. RAI's channels also removed their logo during commercial breaks during 2016–2017 (which had been rare since the introduction of watermark), but this practice has since reversed.

=== Lithuania ===
In Lithuania, DOGs usually appear on the top right corner of the screen, though LNK group's channels place their DOG on the top left corner and used to be removed during non-programme sections. If programming is unsuitable for younger viewers, a DOG showing the age rating is placed in the bottom right corner.

=== Netherlands ===
Most Dutch channels, including Belgian Dutch channels (i.e., in Flanders), place their logos in the top left corner of the screen. Examples are the two main commercial TV broadcasters in the Netherlands, RTL Nederland and Talpa Network; the public broadcaster in Flanders, VRT; and the Flemish commercial broadcasters, DPG Media and De Vijver Media.

However, NPO, the public broadcasting consortium in the Netherlands, displays its logo bugs in the top right corner of the screen, and the logo bug of the presenting broadcaster (such as NOS, AVROTROS and KRO-NCRV) at the top left. This is the opposite of the situation in Finland, where Yle, the public broadcaster, has placed logo bugs in the top left since 2012, but the commercial TV broadcasters use the top right.

=== Norway ===
Norwegian television broadcaster TVNorge introduced DOGs in 1988, becoming the first Norwegian TV channel to do so. Most Norwegian DOGs are shown in either the top-left or top-right corner of the screen; NRK and TV 2 both use the top-right.

=== Poland ===
Virtually all Polish TV channels show their logos in the corner of the screen during all programming, and have done so since the early 1990s. The two TVP channels first introduced them as a test in 1988 and then permanently in early 1993. Various positions of the logo were tested, before settling on the top-right corner on 19 April 1993. Polsat, the first commercial Polish-language broadcaster, launched initially on satellite on 5 December 1992, with a DOG in the top-left corner from the beginning.

Nowadays, most channels, including the major networks such as TVP, Polsat (since 28 February 2005) and TVN, show their logos in the top-right corner of the screen. Top-left corner is also a common location, used by TTV and several cable and satellite channels. News-oriented channels such as TVP Info and TVN24 that display news tickers at the bottom of the screen most of the time, usually integrate their DOGs in the ticker design, typically in the bottom-left corner. Few minor cable and satellite channels show their logos in the bottom-right corner. Most broadcasters remove their DOGs during commercial breaks, although the practice is not universal. Some channels, including most basic free-to-air ones, use alternate logos containing the "HD" branding for their HDTV feeds. This may be related to the fact that Polish digital terrestrial TV lineup consists almost entirely of SDTV streams, with HDTV available through cable and satellite.

Since 15 August 2005, all broadcasters licensed in Poland are also required to display the age rating at all times, during all programming except news, sports and advertising but has been criticized by viewers for exaggeration of age rating to +12 in case of animated or family movies on some TV channels, mainly from TVN, and also on talent show with participation of children (e.g. You Can Dance – Next Generation), for pathologizing of system and for screen burn-in. It is usually shown in the top-left corner, opposite the channel logo. However, Polish broadcasts of international cable networks (such as Discovery Channel, HBO, etc.) usually operate under foreign licenses and are legally treated as rebroadcasts of foreign channels. As such, they don't need to follow this requirement and may use a different rating system instead.

=== Portugal ===
RTP introduced DOGs in the late 1980s, when it was the only broadcaster in Portugal that operated two television channels. Initially, the logos were placed on the top-right corner, but in 1991 they were moved permanently to the top-left corner, to allow television ratings to be shown in the top-right corner. Until 2004 and RTP1's rebranding, their DOGs were placed on the bottom-left corner during newscasts. On some programs or live sport broadcasting, DOGs are placed in the top-right corner. Logos are removed during advertising breaks and trailers. For subtitle information, on RTP1 and RTP2 a number such as 884, 885, 886, 887 or 888 is placed near the logo; in other cases Direto (Live) is sometimes used instead of a number (some programs use neither numbers nor Direto (Live), Gravado (Recorded) or Repetição (Repetition)).

DOGs of privately owned channels were introduced in the mid-1990s. Initially, the logo of TVI was placed in the bottom left corner during only some of its programs; in the mid-2000s the logo was moved into the top left corner, and has been shown across all programs since then. The two Brazilian-owned television services (Globo and RecordTV Europa) have their DOGs placed in the bottom-right corner.

=== Romania ===
Romanian TV channels display their logos in a particular corner of the screen depending on the network. Public broadcaster TVR and commercial network Intact Media Group (which owns Antena 1, one of the country's most popular channels) display their logos at the top right corner (except for news channel Antena 3, which uses the bottom right). However, Pro TV, the most popular commercial station, and its sister channels show their logos at the top left corner (except during news broadcasts, where the Pro TV logo at the top left is removed and a Știrile Pro TV logo is placed at the bottom left, and during football games, when it is placed at the top right, to allow the score display to be seen). This channel along with Acasă TV and Pro Cinema had also the DTH provider logo in the top-right corner, on the transmissions from these DTH platforms, to prevent CATV piracy. The top left corner is also used by national commercial station Kanal D, as well as smaller national TV stations such as National TV and Prima TV. Note that the Pro network channels which are available in HD (namely Pro TV, Pro 2 and Pro X) display the channel logo in the top left but the HD watermark in the top right.

=== Russia ===
In Russia, television channels usually have watermarks, which are usually placed in the top-right or top-left corner of the screen; some notable exceptions are NTV, which places its logo on the bottom-left corner, 2x2 (from 1993 to 1997 and from 2007 until 2021), the Disney Channel (from 2018 until 2022) and Kineko (since 2022) on the bottom-right corner, and Saturday! on the top-center corner but moved to the top-right during advertisements, which is very unusual. In some channels the watermark becomes half-transparent on ad breaks (it used to be removed on ad breaks, but not on trailers), but on main channels such as Channel One or Russia-1 they never disappear nor become half-transparent. Channel One was the first channel to have introduced their watermark in 1992 and by 1993 watermarks appeared on other channels.

=== Serbia ===
Serbian public broadcaster RTS began showing logos around 1989. Its logo was sometimes turned on manually during certain broadcasts but shortly afterwards remained permanently on-screen – in particular after the rebrand in autumn 1992. One could notice how they were manually controlled, as the "logo-free" time during the begin of a program varied. Until November 1994 their logos were opaque black and white, presumably due to being inserted into the analog CVBS signal just before being broadcast instead of an analog YUV, RGB or digital SDI signal; afterwards, they upgraded to colorized yet still opaque logos, that remained until autumn 1995, which is when they became slightly translucent. RTS's predecessor RTB (Radio Television of Belgrade) had DOGs of varying sizes, but rather than being introduced one after another they appear to have been used simultaneously at different broadcast sites. At least three different sizes and styles of their opaque black-and-white logo are known today. On the satellite channel "RTS-SAT", Latin letters were used, but after the destruction of RTS headquarters in 1999 during a NATO air strike, it could be noticed how the logo appeared to have been quickly re-drawn and was being inserted by different equipment as it varied in shape and size, presumably because of the original equipment used to insert it being destroyed. Before 2010 RTS had the same opaque color logo from 1999 on RTS-SAT, and new translucent logos were introduced in late 2001 for the analog terrestrial programs. Old logos remain on most archived recordings presumably due to lack of a cleanfeed archiving policy in the past.

Throughout the 2000s and 2010s (Pink: 2001–2015, B92: 2003–2012, Avala: 2007–2011, Happy: 2012–2021) most television channels in Serbia along with station logo also showed a digital clock below the logo, and sometimes the temperature. This practice is nowadays limited to local and regional stations, of which most of them follow this practice.

=== Slovakia ===
Much like the Czech Republic, TV channels in Slovakia always place their logos in the top left corner of the screen, irrespective of the broadcasting network. The flagship public channel, STV1 (now Jednotka), using the top left ever since 1993 with exception for 2000–2001 and between 2004 and 2012 which used top right corner. The main commercial TV channels, such as TV JOJ and Markíza and their sister channels, have always used the top left corner. The news TV channel TA3 has used the bottom left corner between 2011 and 2017. This is also the case for Czech-language channels that broadcast in Slovakia. Since 2004 (2005 for TV JOJ), almost all commercial television stations in Slovakia keep their logos on the screen and STVR, the country's public broadcasting network, does the opposite during advertisements and program trailers.TV Markíza also did the opposite during advertisements and program trailers between 2008 and 2009.

=== Spain ===
Unlike all other European countries, where channels generally display their logos at the top left or right corner of the screen, the great majority of TV channels in Spain use the bottom right corner to display their logos—much like in the Americas and Australia (except SBS, which uses the top right). Italy is the only other European country to have a significant proportion of channels that use the bottom right corner. This is partly a function of Italian commercial broadcaster Mediaset operating several TV channels in both Italy and Spain (via Mediaset España Comunicación), all of which use the bottom right corner.

Therefore, the channels of most of the major broadcasters—such as public broadcaster RTVE and commercial networks Atresmedia and Mediaset España—place their logos in the bottom right corner. The main exceptions are most regional channels, including Telemadrid, which uses the top left; and TV3 (Catalonia), EITB (Basque State), 7 La Rioja, RTPA in Asturias, Canal Extremadura and Aragón TV, which all use the top right. Canal Sur in Andalusia have changed between top-left and top-right over the years, however currently use bottom-right. Channels that use the bottom-right corner generally move their DOGs to the top-right during sports broadcasts, so as not to block viewers from following the ball.

TVE introduced DOGs in 1984 on TVE1 and TVE2. The DOG of TVE1 was all white until 1991, when the number 1 was changed from white to blue. It remained so until 2003. Antena 3, Telecinco and Canal+ were the first channels to use DOGs from their launch, with the DOGs placed in the top-left and bottom-left corners. In 1992, Antena 3 and Telecinco repositioned their DOGs in the bottom-right, making it the same as TVE. TV3, an Autonomical Channel of Catalonia, used DOGs from 1991, earlier shown only alongside clock indents, and from 1994 until 1999, showed DOGs throughout broadcasting. From 1991 the DOG was removed during advertisements. In 1999, the DOG was removed during the clock. For some programmes, Telecinco has been known to move its DOG to the top-right, however this practice ended in the early 2010s. Cuatro used the top-right on its launch, however in the mid-2010s it switched to the bottom-right. LaSexta has always used the bottom right.

Some channels, particularly Antena 3 and Telecinco, often reserve the top-right for advertising the next programme to come, and use the top-left to keep a permanent hashtag relating to the current programme. Particularly with Telecinco originally using a content-heavy DOG, with the logo, HD and the slogan Contigo siempre until 2024, the practice has made the screen seem cluttered, however much less so since Telecinco refreshed its graphics in 2024.

Most DOGs are removed during advertisements, trade test transmissions or when a program is not aired. An exception to this is El Toro. Canal 3/24 did not remove their DOG during advertisements between 2011 and 2014. TVE and Telecinco tend not to remove their DOG during news broadcasts, however Antena 3 and LaSexta usually do.

=== Switzerland ===
DOGs are generally used in the top right corner during programs, and temporarily disappear during promos and advertising. For example, the Swiss-Italian broadcaster TSI uses DOGs since the 1980s.

=== Ukraine ===
Ukrainian television introduced DOGs in 1991 shortly after the dissolution of the Soviet Union. Ukrainian national broadcaster Pershyi introduced DOGs in 1991 as "УТ-1" (UT-1) in the bottom-right corner but changed to top-left corner of the screen from 1995 to 1998. Since 1998 most of Ukrainian TV channels place their DOGs in top-right corner of screen. Currently, all channels always retain their DOGs even during advertisement breaks.

=== United Kingdom ===
DOGs most commonly appear in the top-left hand corner on British channels. DOGs were first used by satellite and cable television channels during the early 1990s when broadcasts were traditionally unmarked. The first signs of marking on terrestrial television was during news broadcasts, which by 1994 had been extended to score bugs during sports broadcasts when the channel's logo began to be included as part of the score bug. Channel 5 was the first to use DOGs on an analogue terrestrial channel when it launched in 1997. The DOG was originally very bright and noticeable, and was soon toned down. Channel 5 said that the DOG was used to assist viewers in tuning to the new channel once its test transmissions had ceased. Following the rebrand to "five" in 2002 the DOG disappeared until late 2007.

There have been two known predecessors to the digital on-screen graphic on British television, namely a small white outline rectangle that was broadcast on the screen throughout ITV's broadcast of the documentary Life by Misadventure: A Film about the Seriously Burned on 7 September 1973 to warn people that may be uncomfortable with its content, and similarly, Channel 4's infamous red triangle symbol, which was applied in the corner of the screen throughout a series of controversial late-night art films broadcast 1986–87, in addition to an ident before the films began, again in both cases to warn viewers of the content.

The BBC initially introduced a DOG on each of its digital-only channels. In October 1998, They were introduced on BBC One and BBC Two on Sky Digital, and was removed two months later following a large number of complaints from viewers. Until 2015, a BBC Two Digital on screen graphic was used during the overnight BBC Learning Zone strand. The DOGs for the other channels appear at the top left-hand corner on other channels except BBC News and BBC Parliament (which is bottom left and part of the ticker and lower third text graphics, which are not visible during title sequence, breaks, and weather forecasts). The BBC News Channel's DOG does not appear when it airs morning programming as the ticker is not visible during the program. During simulcast between BBC News channel and BBC One for BBC One bulletins, the News channel's DOG appears on BBC One but only when the lower third graphics is expanded, although the DOG and the ticker are visible at all times on the News channel. Other simulcasts (such as during the daytime on BBC Two and overnight on BBC One) usually see the BBC News channel's ticker and DOG visible at all times on all channels. Whilst BBC Four and BBC Parliament have static DOGs, the ones on CBBC and CBeebies alongside other channels such as Nick Jr. feature moving elements. ITV uses DOGs on all its channels, as do its counterparts STV in central/northern Scotland, and UTV in Northern Ireland (which now uses the same ITV1 DOG as the ITV1-branded services in other ITV plc regions; except that the DOG is removed during regional programming). ITV1 does not use a DOG during news programming except for STV which uses a DOG for all news programming.

The logos on channels such as ITV1 (excluding STV), ITV2, ITV3, ITV4, ITV Quiz, Channel 4, E4, More4, 4seven, E4 Extra, 5, 5Star, 5USA, 5Select, 5Action, CBBC (and its toddler-aimed spinoff CBeebies), U&Dave, U&Drama, U&Eden, U&W, U&Yesterday, U&Gold, U&Alibi, True Crime, True Crime Xtra, Legend, LegendXtra, MTV, Sky Sports, Challenge, Blaze, MysteryX, Great! Movies, Great! TV, Great! Romance, Great! Action, Discovery Channel, Animal Planet, Discovery History, Discovery Turbo, Investigation Discovery, DMAX, TLC, Quest, Quest Red, Really and Food Network are almost transparent, whereas others like those on Paramount's Comedy Central and Comedy Central Extra, Nick Jr., Nicktoons, Nickelodeon, with WBD's Cartoon Network and Boomerang along with Crime & Investigation, National Geographic, Nat Geo Wild, Disney Jr. are intelligent and noticeable. The Sky Cinema channels and Film4 do not utilize DOGs. Some television channels such as those owned by Warner Bros. Discovery display their on-screen graphics permanently.

Most UK channels remove them during commercials and trailers, with most Sky channels such as Sky Arts, Sky One, Sky Atlantic and Sky History removing them altogether at certain times into a program, usually after appearing for at least 10–15 seconds long, this is called a "burst DOG", however Sky Kids uses a DOG for the remainder of the programme without being removed until the programme has finished. In addition to a fixed (sometimes animated) motif, MTV includes the program title in the top-right hand corner.

On digital systems such as Sky and Freeview, where stations have a set EPG number and a name displayed across the bottom of the screen when changing channel, DOGs have been deemed unnecessary by some users. Despite this, broadcasters persist with the practice. In response to negative feedback, the BBC has responded, "We believe it is important to ensure that viewers can quickly identify when they are watching a BBC service." It reinforced this position in both 2008 and 2009 following continual complaints to its Points of View program, citing channel identification as the sole reason for the policy. In its website FAQs, Five's stated reason for its use of a DOG is that "the vast majority of channels carry them, most permanently and virtually every channel at some point has one during the day." However, on 21 October 2008, the BBC announced that it was removing the DOG from BBC HD for all films and most dramas, acknowledging that there was an "irritation factor". However, the DOG came back when BBC One HD launched in 2010.

As of 2026, neither BBC One HD nor BBC Two HD has been using their own DOG. More recent additions are graphics which appear near the end of a program to tell the viewer what's up next, despite this information being available at a touch of a key on digital TV. Many viewers also find this practice annoying, distracting and unnecessary. However, a generic BBC logo appears on the top left-hand corner of their iPlayer feeds as is the case with other BBC channels. This generic BBC DOG also appears on catch-up or on-demand programs on the iPlayer. Since the early 2020s, some BBC Sport programming has used a DOG in the bottom-right corner, rarely used in the UK, during pre-match and half-time punditry analysis, but it is removed when the match starts.

== North America ==
=== Canada ===
CTV places their opaque logo over Fox's on-screen graphic during American Idol.

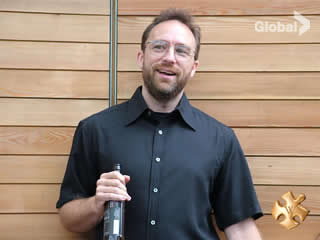
A simulation of how a Canadian TV network could place their logo if a US network's logo is already present.

Logo bugs are used by Canadian broadcasters in a nearly identical manner to U.S. broadcasters. However, a complication emerges when Canadian broadcasters simulcast U.S. programming (a frequent practice among broadcast television networks, intended to invoke the simultaneous substitution rules requiring TV providers to substitute the feeds of U.S. broadcast channels with those of local, Canadian broadcast channel, if they are airing identically scheduled programming). While pre-recorded programs (e.g. dramas, sitcoms) can be delivered to the broadcaster by their distributor and played out locally (without depending on taking a feed from a U.S. network), live programs may not always have a clean feed available that is free of the U.S. network's bugs and imaging, necessitating the use of a dirty feed from the network instead.

In these scenarios, some channels—including, most frequently, CTV and CTV 2, as well as its Bell Media sister channels—covered the U.S. network's bug with their own, opaque logo. However, Bell has since ceased this practice, and the majority of broadcasters "co-brand" the dirty feed by placing their own bug in a different corner of the screen than the U.S. logo.

BiteTV didn't use a screen bug before 2009, instead opting to use a multi-panel layout.

Some channels in Canada (such as YTV or the now-defunct Teletoon) used to display a ten-second animation as the screen bug that would play every segment after 1 – 3 minutes. This practice was mostly discontinued in 2012. However, the now-defunct Family Channel continued this until 2017.

=== United States ===
The first logo bug appeared in the 1970s on cable networks and local TV stations. It was often displayed on the bottom of the screen for 5 to 10 seconds. It was usually displayed once per hour, or every 10 or 15 minutes during a program. One of the popular title generator machines during that time was made by Chyron, but other brands were also used. The first transparent logo bug to be displayed throughout an entire program was the CBS Evening News in 1990. It was part of a graphical redesign of the news broadcast done by branding design firm Novocom. The reason for its introduction was so that domestic business travelers would know which channel in their hotel carried a CBS affiliate immediately without a glance at a printed channel list, and soon it spread to the entirety of the CBS network schedule. The "big four" networks (CBS, ABC, NBC, FOX) began using full-time on-screen bugs in September 1993, with the bug removed during commercial breaks. Other major networks such as The WB and UPN also used logo bugs in the same manner. Since then, the use of digital on-screen bugs among cable and broadcast networks has become standard.

The bug is usually placed on the lower right hand corner of the screen, with the notable exception being during the broadcasting of sports events and on some religious television networks (where logo bugs have largely been placed in the top-right to accommodate descriptive text, prayer lines, or Bible verses), and on most NBCUniversal networks (including NBC) and Ion Television, where their standard bugs were moved to the bottom left during prime time programming in 2006 and the early 2010s, respectively. CBS followed suit in September 2021, with its bug moving to the bottom left as part of a rebranding the previous year. During sports broadcasts, NFL on Fox introduced FoxBox, a permanent graphic at the top left-hand side of the screen showing the score of the game, along with the network's logo.

Bugs are usually monochrome to minimize distraction, while some cable networks like Nickelodeon, The Weather Channel, MSNBC, Fox News Channel, and CNBC use full-color identifiers. Broadcast stations and networks typically only use solid, full-color bugs during local newscasts, network newscasts, and sports broadcasts; at other times the bug is switched to the transparent, gray variant. Also, broadcast channels typically show their local affiliate's call sign and/or the channel number on the screen bugs during local newscasts and in some cases syndicated programming. First-run syndicated programs often display their own logo, in addition to the bug of the station they are running on. Meanwhile, network-based programming (including prime time programs and national newscasts) is typically shown with only the network's bug for most of the broadcast (although an automated system may allow a local bug to be overlaid onto network programming for a few seconds after the start of a program or a commercial break).

Before the 2009 digital television transition, early high definition broadcasts often used bugs placed outside the 4:3 safe zone (sometimes with special "HD" branding) to distinguish them from the standard definition broadcast. By the late-2000s, due to networks switching to a singular HD feed down converted for SD (assuming that the SD feed will be center-cut from the HD feed, or using Active Format Description (AFD) metadata to specify the framing format) as their network feed rather than distinct feeds for both formats, most broadcast networks dropped HD-specific logo bugs and used bugs in the 4:3 safe zone for all viewers, regardless of feed. By 2018, most bugs and on-air presentations have been oriented exclusively for 16:9 framing.

The inclusion of text advertisements for upcoming programs alongside the bug is also particularly prevalent among some broadcasters. Since the mid-2000s, some stations and networks showed their websites alongside their bugs, especially during newscasts. National morning shows like Today and Good Morning America have also shown their specific websites rather than their network's main website in addition to the bug that shows their program. Beginning in 2010, some networks began to display show-specific hashtags alongside their bugs, which encourage viewers to discuss and interact with the program online via social networking services such as Twitter.

== Oceania ==
=== Australia ===
Australia first introduced the digital on-screen graphic in the early 1990s on Prime7 (then Prime Television) and WIN Television. The Seven Network was the first metropolitan network to broadcast digital on-screen graphics on all of their programs in 1999, following Nine Network in 2001, Network 10 in 2004 and the ABC in 2005. DOGs in Australia most commonly appear in the bottom-right-hand corner of the screen, but sports orientated content that uses the network's sports brand (e.g. Seven Network and Seven Sport) generally appear on the top-right hand corner of the screen. One originally placed its DOG in the top-right hand corner of the screen due to it being a sports-orientated channel at the time, but after the 2011 rebrand to allow a wide range of content to be broadcast, the channel's DOG was moved to the bottom-right-hand corner of the screen. The ABC3 and ABC Kids channels originally placed their DOGs in the top-left hand corner of the screen, but moved them down to the bottom-right-hand corner as of late 2013. Datacasting channels and home shopping channels show their DOGs in the top-right hand corner of the screen.

DOGs are generally shown in a semi-transparent format, but are shown opaque during in-program advertisements that take place at the very bottom of the screen. News services have their own DOGs placed where their network's DOG would normally be, but are only shown in an opaque format. News services generally show footage that was captured by another network (usually for sporting stories), but the semi-transparent DOG of the original network is still shown. Current affairs programs and other news programs that are produced by the network generally show their own opaque DOG at the bottom-left hand corner of the screen, opposite to their network's semi-transparent DOG which still appears (e.g. Nine Network and A Current Affair/AMV & Seven).

Australian TV networks hide all of their DOGs during advertisement breaks, news and live sport programs. They only reappear during the promotion for a program that will be shown on the station and are not shown during any other advertisement material.

At times, networks will superimpose a semi-transparent watermark immediately adjacent to their DOG to advertise an upcoming special event that the network will be broadcasting (e.g. Network 10 superimposed an advertisement for the Sochi 2014 Winter Olympics on their primary channel (Ten), 10 Bold, and 10 Peach as they were to be the Australian broadcaster of the event), or to advertise a popular upcoming program.

In addition, during ABC's ABC News Breakfast, Seven's Sunrise and 10 Peach's Toasted TV (prior to 2018), a digital clock appears on the bottom right-hand corner of the screen while Nine's Today Show and 10's Studio 10 appears on the bottom left-hand corner of the screen.

Currently, the DOGs of channels from ABC, Seven, Prime, Nine, WIN and 10 are on the bottom-right-hand corner, while SBS' DOGs are either on the top-right hand corner (in most of its channels and programs), or on the top-left hand corner, or not shown at all (for both of these cases, see this table below).

Channel DOG positions for international news bulletins on SBS World Watch
Language	Country of origin	Network/Broadcaster	DOG position
Arabic	France	France 24	Top left
Armenian	Armenia	ARMTV (Armenia 1)	Top left
Bengali	Bangladesh	Channel i	No DOG
Bosnian	Bosnia and Herzegovina	BHRT (BHT 1)	Top left
Croatian	Croatia	HRT (HRT 1)	Top left
Dutch	Netherlands	NPO/NOS (NPO 1 via BVN)	Top left
English	Germany	DW (DW English)	Top right
English	France	France 24	Top right
Filipino	Philippines	ABS-CBN (Kapamilya Channel, TeleRadyo Serbisyo), A2Z (via TFC)	Top right
French	France	France Télévisions (France 2)	Top left
French	France	France 24	Top right
German	Germany	ZDF	Top right
Greek	Greece	ERT (ERT1/ERT News via ERT World)	Top right
Gujarati	India	DD (DD Girnar)	Top left
Hindi	India	Aaj Tak	Top right
Indonesian	Indonesia	TVRI (TVRI Nasional)	No DOG
Italian	Italy	RAI (Rai 1)	Top right
Japanese	Japan	NHK (NHK G via NHK World Premium)	No DOG
Korean	South Korea	YTN (via YTN WORLD)	No DOG
Macedonian	North Macedonia	MRT (MRT 1)	Top right
Malayalam	India	DD (DD Malayalam)	Top left
Maltese	Malta	PBS (TVM)	Top left
Nepali	Nepal	Nepal Television	No DOG
Polish	Poland	Polsat Group (Polsat/Polsat News)	Top left
Portuguese	Portugal	RTP (RTP1 via RTP Internacional)	Top right
Punjabi	India	PTC News	No DOG
Romanian	Romania	TVR (TVR 1 via TVRi)	Top left
Serbian	Serbia	RTS (RTS1)	Top left
Sinhalese	Sri Lanka	SLRC (Rupavahini)	Top right
Spanish	Spain	RTVE (La 1 via TVE Internacional)	Top right
Tamil	India	Polimer TV	Top right
Telugu	India	DD (DD Yadagiri)	Top left
Thai	Thailand	Thai PBS	Top right
Turkish	Turkey	TRT (TRT Haber)	No DOG
Ukrainian	Ukraine	Suspilne (Pershyi)	No DOG
Urdu	Pakistan	PTV (PTV Home/PTV News via PTV Global)	Top left

=== New Zealand ===
New Zealand introduced the digital on-screen graphics in 2001, starting with TV3 and FOUR. New Zealand FTA now placed their logos on the bottom right hand corner, with the exception of Māori Television and as of 9 February 2017, TV3. TV One had the logo on the top right hand corner until the switch to the bottom right hand corner on 1 July 2013. TV2 usually had the logo from the top right hand corner until New Year's Day 2012 when they switched it to the bottom right hand corner. Prime Television New Zealand now placed their logo on the bottom right hand corner as of March 2016.

== Latin America ==
=== Argentina ===
Beginning in the late 1990s, almost all television stations in Argentina had their logos being shown on the top-right of the screen. When Canal 9 relaunched in 2002 to replace Azul Televisión, its logo was shown on the bottom-left of the screen. After intense criticism, Canal 9 moved its logo to the top-right of the screen of which most Argentine broadcasters had almost always followed.

=== Brazil ===
In Brazil, digital on-screen graphics were introduced in the mid-1990s and are always used by all channels (free and pay). In most free-to-air channels, the logos are located on the bottom-right-hand corner of the screen (except for RedeTV!, TV Gazeta, TV Cultura, and GloboNews, whose logos are placed on the top right corner of the screen, and for TV Brasil, the top left corner (formerly the top right corner); on all free channels they are usually transparent, but if some program or event is being broadcast live or exclusive or if some archived footage is shown, they become colorful. Most pay channels usually have the logos on the top right corner of the screen. In some pay channels, the logos appear even in commercial breaks, but they become transparent in this situation.

=== Chile ===
Chilean television stations started showing their logos permanently in the 1990s, though some channels, like Televisión Nacional de Chile, have made some tests with DOGs as early as 1981. During that time, logos were placed in the bottom-right of the screen. La Red was the first television broadcaster to move their logo to the top of the screen. Additionally, between 1992 and 1994, the logo shown as a DOG would replace the letter "E" in its name with any other object, depending on the context (for example, a soccer ball would replace the "E" during sports-related programming), something that was part of their general branding back then. In 1997, due to a logo change, the logo was placed at the top-left, and later due to the same reason, moved to the top-right until now. Other broadcasters, such as Mega, which its logo being originally shown on the bottom-left of the screen, moved to the top-right of the screen due to similar reasons; Canal 13, in a similar manner, moved its logo from the bottom-right to the top-right corner in 2002. Chilevisión has continued to have its logo being shown on the bottom-right of the screen until 2007, when it moved to the top-right of the screen, of which other television channels in Chile had followed in the past years. Beginning in the late 2000s, separate logos are used for network newscasts; they are usually placed in the bottom-left corner and are shown in conjunction with the network logo.

=== El Salvador ===
In the mid-1980s, Canal 12 started with a VCR (Video Cassette Recording) text as "TV-12" white, and TCS's Canal 4 used as the channel's logo on the top-left position, both exclusively in live events. Telecorporación Salvadoreña (TCS) channels began using exclusively on newsreels and live events by 1987, and TVCE (today TVES), a Salvadoran public broadcaster began using as a VCR text with a cyan and sometimes a yellow colour only on live in early-1990s. TCS Channels began using in 2000, for each one of the three channels permanently as a normal broadcasting; other channels did the same thing as of now, commonly on the top-right screen. Each September the logo uses as an Independence Month with a Salvadoran flag for TCS Channels, and each December the logo uses as a holiday decoration. Some television channels and programs uses as a transparent logo, a digital clock or both such as Agape TV.

=== Mexico ===
In Mexico, Once TV and XEIMT-TV were the first channels to use their logos permanently in the top-right of the screen since 1997. The channels of Televisa and TV Azteca did not start to use logos permanently until 2000 and 2004 respectively, in their channels.

=== Venezuela ===
In Venezuela, most Venezuelan TV networks display DOGs at top-left corner of the screen. Venevisión introduced DOGs in 1996, becoming first Venezuelan TV channel to do so. It was later followed by VTV and other Venezuelan TV networks in early 2000s.
