= Stöð 3 =

- Country: Iceland
- Network: Stöð 2

Ownership
- Owner: Sýn

History
- Launched: September 7, 2013
- Closed: 2020
- Replaced by: Stöð 2 Fjölskylda

Links
- Website: Official Site

Stöð 3 was an Icelandic general television channel, owned and operated by Sýn. Founded on September 7, 2013. The channel showcased a wide range of programming from the US and domestic programming. The channel was only available based as a subscription service. All non-Icelandic programming was subtitled.

An unrelated channel of the same name existed between 1995 and 1997.

The channel shut in 2020 and was merged into Stöð 2 Fjölskylda.

== See also ==
- Bylgjan
- Fréttablaðið
