= Norðurljós =

Norðurljós (Icelandic pronunciation: [ˈnɔrðʏrˌljouːs], lit. 'Northern Lights') was an Icelandic mass media corporation. It owned the television stations Stöð 2, Sýn and PoppTíVí, several radio stations, including Bylgjan and the daily newspapers Fréttablaðið and DV. All of those were sold to the telecommunications company Og fjarskipti, and split into 365 ljósvakamiðlar (TV and radio stations) and 365 prentmiðlar (newspapers). It also used to own the stores Skífan, Office 1 Superstore (in Iceland), Sony Center Stores (in Iceland) and BT and the cinemas Smárabíó and Regnboginn, which were sold earlier to Dagur group.
