= NFS =

NFS may refer to:

== Organisations ==
- NFS (news service) (Nýja fréttastofan), a defunct Icelandic television news service
- National Film School, former name of the National Film and Television School, England
- National Financial Switch, bank network in India
- National Fire Service, the Second World War UK fire service
- National Flying Services, a defunct British aviation company
- Council of Nordic Trade Unions (Nordens Fackliga Samorganisation)
- National Forest System, created by the US Land Revision Act of 1891
  - National Forest System, division of the 1905 formed United States Forest Service
- National Funding Scheme, UK charity fundraising organisation

== Technology ==
- Network File System, a distributed file system protocol
- Near-field scanner, scanning technology
- Number field sieve (disambiguation), algorithms for factoring integers

== Other uses ==
- Need for Speed, a series of racing video games
