= Tónlist TV =

Icelandic music and general entertainment channel

- Type: Broadcast television channel
- Country: Iceland

Ownership
- Owner: Sýn

History
- Launched: 5 March 2014
- Founder: Konunglega Kvikmyndafélagið
- Closed: 2016
- Former names: Bravó (2014-2016); Nova TV (2007-2014)

Links
- Website: Tónlist TV Website; Tónlist TV Watch Live

Tónlist TV (Icelandic pronunciation: [ˈtʰounˌlɪst], lit. 'Music'; previously Bravó) was an Icelandic music channel targeting a demographic of 14–24 years of age. The channel is operated by Sýn and was launched on 5 March 2014 as Bravó TV. In 2016, the station was rebranded as Tónlist TV.

The channel was replaced in 2016 with a non-stop music video online channel called Tónlist.

== History ==
Music channels in Iceland have changed over the years. The first was Sirkus followed by its rebranding to before Popp Tíví. This was later replaced by Nova TV in 2007 operated by Icelandic telecommunications company Nova. In Nova stopped broadcasting in 2014. Media 365 purchased Bravó from Konunglega Kvikmyndafélagið in June 2014 following its launch in March 2014.

The channel aired mainly music videos with a mix of non-Icelandic youth programming.

== See also ==
- List of Icelandic television channels
