= Stod =

Stod can refer to:

== Places ==
- Stod (Plzeň-South District), a town in the Czech Republic
- Stod, Trøndelag, a village in Steinkjer Municipality in Trøndelag county, Norway
- Stod Municipality, a former municipality in the old Nord-Trøndelag county, Norway
- Stod River, a river in India

== Other ==
- Stød, a phenomenon in Danish phonology
- Stod IL, a sports club in Steinkjer, Norway

== See also ==
- Stöð 1, Stöð 2, Stöð 2 Sport 2 — Icelandic television channels.
