= Ingvi Hrafn Jónsson =

Icelandic journalist, news director and writer

- Born: 27 July 1942 (age 84); Reykjavík, Kingdom of Iceland
- Education: University of Wisconsin in Madison
- Occupations: Journalist, news director and writer
- Years active: 1966–present

Ingvi Hrafn Jónsson (born 27 July 1942) is an Icelandic news reporter and television host. He is known for his career as the news director for RÚV and Stöð 2 and later for his TV station ÍNN.

== Early life ==
Ingvi was born to Jón Sigtryggsson, a doctor and dentist, founder and first professor and dean of the Faculty of Dentistry at the University of Iceland, and Jórunn Tynes. He graduated from Menntaskólinn í Reykjavík in 1965 and later studied political science at the University of Wisconsin in Madison.

== Career ==
After completing his studies, he returned to Morgunblaðið, where he had previously worked as a summer employee, as a foreign affairs correspondent. After a few years at Morgunblaðið, Ingvi started his own marketing and promotional work company but returned to the news when he was hired as a parliamentary reporter for The Icelandic National Broadcasting Service (RÚV). In 1985, he was hired as the news director RÚV. His stint as director was controversial and was eventually fired by the Director General of the RÚV, Markús Örn Antonsson, on 19 April 1988. In 1988, he published his book Þá flaug Hrafninn, about his time at RÚV. He later worked as a news director and program director at Stöð 2 and Bylgjan from 1992 to 1994. He returned to media in 1999 with the radio station Útvarp Saga where he worked until 2003. He worked for NFS from 2003 to 2006 where he hosted the show Hrafnaþing In 2007, he founded the TV station ÍNN where he continued with the Hrafnaþing show. Following the closure of ÍNN in 2017, he continued the show on YouTube.

== Personal life ==
Ingvi's brother was journalist Óli Tynes who rose to national prominence with his news reporting during the Cod Wars in 1976.
