= NFS (news service) =

Icelandic TV news channel (2005–2006)

- Country: Iceland

Programming
- Language: Icelandic

Ownership
- Owner: 365

History
- Launched: November 18, 2005
- Closed: September 22, 2006

NFS, or Nýja fréttastofan, (English: The New News Service), was a short-lived Icelandic television news channel that began operations on the morning of November 18, 2005, broadcasting news in Icelandic from 7 a.m. until 11 p.m. NFS succeeded the news agencies Stöð 2 (Channel 2) and Bylgjan (The Wave). The media company 365 operated NFS, which was broadcast on Digital Ísland and it reached the capital region and Akuyreri, and was on the internet at Vísir.is. NFS stopped broadcasting on September 22, 2006. After its demise, its main news show moved back to Stöð 2 and Bylgjan.

== History ==
Róbert Marshall was the director of NFS and Sigmundur Ernir Rúnarsson was the editor-in-chief. The vice-directors were Þór Jónsson and Þórir Guðmundsson, and the technical director was Ingi Ragnar Ingason. The news agency actually consisted of two parts. One group was the evening news team, whose reporters had previously worked for Stöð 2 and Bylgjan. The other was the so-called news agency, which comprised a group of young people with various media experience. For financial reasons, the staff members had to do it all, serving as camerapeople, reporters, and editors. NFS's news hour, excluding the evening news, was the job of the second group.

The station stopped broadcasting on its own channel on Friday, September 22, 2006, at 8:00 p.m. resulting in the firing of 20 employees. A few days before that, Róbert Marshall wrote an open letter to Jón Ásgeir Jóhannesson, director of Baugur Group and one of the senior partners of 365, with the title "Kæri Jón" (Dear John). The letter appealed to Jón Ásgeir, asking him push for NFS to continue to have a secure basis for operations. Everything came to naught and Róbert was among those who resigned that day.

The news was broadcast for a short time under the brand NFS, but in fall 2006, it was decided that the news station would once again broadcast under the brand Fréttastofa Stöðvar 2 (Channel 2 News).
