= Íslenski listinn =

Icelandic music chart

Íslenski listinn is the Icelandic top 20 music chart. The list gets updated weekly. The end of the year list contains the top 50 songs of the year. The list has been published by many medias over the years, such as newspapers, television, and radio, and is currently hosted by the radio station FM957 which is owned by Sýn.

== History ==
Íslenski listinn, and its current name, was announced for the first time in the newspaper DV in January 1993. The list was a co-operation between DV, the radio station Bylgjan, and Coca-Cola Iceland. The list was to be a top 40 list and published every Thursday in a special music segment of the newspaper. Then on Thursday night, the songs would play on the radio in a special 3-hour radio program on Bylgjan. The first radio program was hosted by Jón Axel Ólafsson.
