= Sýn (TV channel) =

Icelandic television station

- Type: Free-to-air television channel
- Country: Iceland

Programming
- Language: Icelandic
- Picture format: 1080i HDTV

Ownership
- Owner: Sýn
- Sister channels: Sýn Sport

History
- Launched: 2025; 1 year ago
- Replaced: Stöð 2

Links
- Website: Official website

Sýn is an Icelandic free-to-air television channel which replaced Stöð 2. It is operated by Sýn, an Icelandic mass media company, and distributed over IPTV systems, over-the-top steaming services and DVB-T2 terrestrial broadcast in Iceland. It broadcasts entertainment and movies. In conjunction, Sýn+ provides a video-on-demand (VOD) streaming service, available as a separate service.

== History ==
Sýn was launched in 1990 as a pay-TV channel broadcast over VHF in Iceland, available using a descrambler. It was a sports oriented channel which also aired movies and late-night erotic content.

In 2008, the original Sýn branding was retired and the channel became Stöð 2 Sports 2.

In 2017, Fjarskipti hf. (Vodafone Iceland) acquired 365. In 2018, Fjarskipti hf. (Og Vodafone) adopted the name Sýn as the parent company for Vodafone Iceland and Stöð 2.

=== Stöð 2 rebranding to Sýn ===
Stöð 2 was established in 1986 as Iceland's first independent television station, as a pay-television service.

In June 2025, the long-standing brand and channel, Stöð 2 (owned by Sýn), was relaunched and adopted the name Sýn for all its branding. All Stöð 2 content and programming was rebranded as Sýn, including sub-channels such as Stöð 2 Sport, now Sýn Sport. In conjunction, the new Sýn station is free-to-air and freely available, unlike the previously encrypted Stöð 2 broadcasts. Sýn continued broadcasting evening news and entertainment content as Stöð 2 had previously done.

In September 2026, Sýn discontinued its evening television news service, including Ísland í dag.

== See also ==
- Sýn
- Stöð 2
- Television in Iceland
