= Daysleeper (band) =

Icelandic band

Daysleeper was an Icelandic pop band formed in October 2001 by Sverrir Bergmann, along with Jón Svanur Sveinsson, Víðir "V" Vernharðsson, Brynjar Elefsen, Stefán Pétur Viðarsson and Ingólfur Árnason. They achieved nationwide popularity in Iceland in February 2002 when they won a listener's award from local radio station FM 957 for their song "Kumbh Mela"" from their debut album, EveAlice. During the recording sessions for their second album, Elefsen, Viðarsson and Árnason departed and Helgi Svavar Helgason joined on drums.

The band split up soon after the release of their second album, Daysleeper, with Bergmann embarking on a solo career, performing at the Iceland Airwaves festival in October 2008.

== Discography ==
=== Studio albums ===
- EveAlice (2002, Skífan/Sena)
- Daysleeper (2004, Sena)
