= Vísir.is =

Icelandic online newspaper

- Type: Online newspaper
- Owner: Sýn hf.
- Founded: 1998
- Headquarters: Iceland
- Website: www.visir.is

Vísir.is is an Icelandic online newspaper. It was founded in 1998 by Frjáls fjölmiðlun ehf ("Free Media Ltd.") and officially opened on 1 April the same year. It originally published news from the newspapers Dagblaðið Vísir, Viðskiptablaðið and Dagur. On 1 December 2017 it was bought by Fjarskipti hf. (later Sýn) along with Stöð 2 and Bylgjan from 365 miðlar.

According to Gallup, it was the second-most popular website in Iceland as of February 2021.

== See also ==
- List of newspapers in Iceland
