= Silvía Night =

Fictional character from the series Sjáumst með Silvíu Nótt

- Sjáumst með Silvíu Nótt character
- First appearance: 2005
- Last appearance: 2007
- Created by: Gaukur Úlfarsson and Ágústa Eva Erlendsdóttir
- Portrayed by: Ágústa Eva Erlendsdóttir

In-universe information
- Full name: Silvía Nótt Sæmundsdóttir
- Occupation: TV host; singer
- Significant other: Hugo Estevez
- Nationality: Icelandic

Silvía Night (Icelandic: Silvía Nótt; Icelandic: [ˈsɪlvija ˈnouht]) is a fictional, satirical character on Sjáumst með Silvíu Nótt ('The Silvia Night Show'), an Icelandic comedy show of the television channel Skjár einn. The character was invented by Gaukur Úlfarsson and Ágústa Eva Erlendsdóttir; the latter plays Silvía Night, and interviews people in real-life situations.

Before the show made its début on TV, and when Silvía was still unknown, she used to upset the people she interviewed dramatically with her outrageous behaviour.

Silvía Night was Iceland's participant in the Eurovision Song Contest 2006. Her antics, both onstage and offstage, created controversy and garnered international media attention. Her album Goldmine was released in April. It topped the official Icelandic albums chart on 23 April 2007.

== The character ==
Ágústa Eva Erlendsdóttir, temporary singer of the band Ske and an actress, and Gaukur Úlfarsson, decided to invent a character to adopt as an alter ego (cf. Ali G) that brought out elements of human behaviour in modern society. Silvía's personality is highly affected by narcissism, self-centeredness and she sees herself as the most famous and talented person walking the planet Earth. Her favorite foods are sushi and feta cheese and she aims for a career as a model, singer and a movie star.

Her full Icelandic name is Silvía Nótt Sæmundsdóttir, (Note: See Icelandic naming conventions) and she was born on 20 February 1973. Silvía originally means 'wood nymph' and Nótt simply means 'night'. The name was probably not meant to have any learned connotations, but is rather typical of Icelandic pop culture christening fashions of the new century. Silvía's boyfriend is the Argentinian alpha male Romario Hugo Estevez, performed by Icelandic actor Björn Thors. Her use of language includes heavy slang and she frequently uses English words and phrases while speaking in Icelandic, not always correctly. In her public appearances at the Eurovision Song Contest, she spoke entirely in English, exaggerating her Icelandic accent even more than usual.

== Reception ==
Silvía Night has greatly influenced many people in Iceland. Her style and behaviour is often imitated by loyal preteen fans. However, she has been criticised greatly for being vulgar and lewd, creating her image of nouveau riche.

In February 2006, Silvía was voted Iceland's sexiest woman by the audience of the national radio station Rás 2, and Ágústa Eva came in fourth place. Silvía Night received an Edda Award (Edduverðlaun; Icelandic film and TV awards) in 2005 for the best comical show of the year and as the best fictional character of the year.

== Eurovision Song Contest ==
Silvía Night was Iceland's participant in Eurovision Song Contest 2006 with the song "Congratulations", after winning the Icelandic national finals. The song was originally in Icelandic, called "Til hamingju Ísland" (lit. 'Congratulations Iceland'). The Icelandic lyrics, heavily filled with slang, talk about how lucky Icelanders are that she was born in Iceland and that she is going to win the contest, because she's better than all the other contestants. (Note: See § The Character)

The song was controversial because it was being distributed on the Internet before the competition, which was contrary to the rules of the competition. Silvía Night was nonetheless not banned from the competition. This decision by RÚV ('National Broadcasting Company') has been criticised, with one participating song writer filing a complaint, which was dismissed.

Silvía's song placed 13th in the semi-final held on 18 May in Athens, leaving her out of the finals on 20 May.

=== Controversies ===
Silvía claimed that the only reason Carola qualified for the final was that she had sex with the head of the EBU in a car before the competition. Asked if she was serious, she replied "Yes. I saw them in a car right outside my hotel room. What she's done is terrible ... it's her fault I didn't qualify. She's been copying me ever since I got here".

Another controversy surrounds the English lyrics to her Eurovision song, "Congratulations". In the first verse the lyrics say "The vote is in, they say I win", however, in the video and at rehearsals she sang "The vote is in, I'll fucking win". According to Eurovision rules, songs should not contain foul language. Silvía Nótt responded on her website, that she would "fucking say what [she] fucking [wants]". In the semi-finals, on 18 May, she did not use the expletive, instead she sang "I'll freaking win". In her appearance for the semi-finals, a great part of the audience and artists from the other countries reacted by booing her, not tolerating her supposedly provocative and unprofessional behaviour.

The song did not make it to the final. Silvía staged some photo-ops to indicate her 'regret'. She pretended to slap her boyfriend, and then threatened to jump from a bridge. Then she started yelling foul language and spitting at the journalists. At one point she yelled, "Ungrateful bastards! You vote some ugly people from Finland that don't even have real make-up artists, and you don't vote for me because I'm not a slut from Holland and I'm not an ugly, fucking, old bitch from Sweden!" (referring to Lordi, Treble, and Carola Häggkvist; although Treble also failed to qualify for the final and even received fewer points than Silvía). A journalist said to her, "This is not too good, why are you saying this?", but she replied with a "Fuck you!". Then she said "Somebody has been telling lies about me, and I think it is you!", pointing to a random journalist, and added, "Your television station is telling everybody I hated Greece and I said that they're ugly and I never said it and you are a slut and I hate you! I will sue you, and I will sue the competition, and you will all go to jail!"

Silvía Night's tantrum also trended on YouTube getting 1,300,000 views within four days.

According to Silvía Night, in an "antipromo" for her show, the Silvía Night Show, Silvía claimed that producers added artificial booing and claims that while singing, she didn't hear any booing. Silvía also claimed that after her performance, the person who had been throwing a tantrum, yelling obscenities, and crying was a hired look-alike of Silvía to make the real Silvía Night look bad in front of an international audience, when "in reality" Silvía had gone back to her home and gone to sleep. Silvía also claims that her boyfriend who had cheated and abused her during the contest was also made to look bad and make it seem like he had an affair, when he wasn't and had apparently "told [her]". Throughout the "antipromo", she also claimed that the film crew that was filming Silvía was during her most vulnerable moments, and that "they were always making [her] look like a total bitch!", and showed moments of the "good side" of Silvía, which was her giving free copies of her albums, albeit with her telling them to scram afterwards. She ended the antipromo saying "If anybody tries to sell you The Silvía Night Show, do not buy it, because they are evil people who are trying to ruin my reputation and ruin my name, and they don't have any soul. They're black inside and they will puke [blitz?] on you. DO NOT BUY IT, AND DO NOT LET ANYONE BUY IT!" The "antipromo" ends with a "Say NO to the Silvía Night Show" message over a pink background.

== Goldmine ==
Silvía's debut studio album was titled Goldmine. According to her official website she signed one of the largest record contracts in Icelandic music history. Goldmine topped the official Icelandic albums chart for two weeks, starting on 23 April 2007. The album also produced two charting singles, Thank You Baby and Goldmine.

== Notes ==
Preceded by Selma with "If I Had Your Love"	Iceland in the Eurovision Song Contest; 2006	Succeeded by Eiríkur Hauksson with "Valentine Lost"
