= Vidar Halldorsson =

Icelandic sociologist and professor at the University of Iceland

Vidar Halldorsson (born 1970) is an Icelandic sociologist and professor at the University of Iceland (Háskóli Íslands) credited with authoring Sport in Iceland: How Small Nations Achieve International Success, which was the first book to use sociological approaches to prove that local, cultural, and international factors of sports development more generally affected the success of sports in Iceland, a relatively small nation with tremendous success in international sporting events. The book was deemed innovative by shedding light on the Icelandic sports system and Icelandic culture as explanations for sporting success.

== Early life ==
Vidar Halldorsson earned a bachelor's degree in sociology at the University of Iceland in 1998, then a master's degree in sociology of sports at the University of Leicester, England in 2000. In 2012 he finished his PhD in sociology at the University of Iceland.

== Career ==
Vidar was an assistant professor in sociology of sports at the Iceland University of Education from August 2003 to July 2005. From January 2005 until January 2008, Vidar Halldorsson was assistant professor also in sociology of sports, as well as the head of the sport sciences department at Reykjavik University. Since 2014 he has been a member of the faculty of Sociology at the University of Iceland, and has been a full-time professor there ever since June 2019.

Vidar Halldorsson has participated in various lectures, such as the FGV/CIES/FMA Sport: Human, Economic and Social Development in 2018, the WSG 2019 European Regional Meeting on the topic of Iceland Dynamic Football Team, Soft Power and International Leverage, and The Sport Success of Iceland: how a small nation achieved international success at the University of West Indies, Trinidad & Tobago on behalf of CIES/FIFA, in 2020. He has also been interviewed in a number of newspapers, such as Time Magazine, BBC, FranceInfo, Fréttablaðið, Vísir and others.

Vidar Halldorsson's focus as a sociology professor lies mostly in the fields of the sociology of achievement, in particular within the paradigms of the sociology of knowledge, the sociology of culture and performance studies. In this sense, his research emphasizes the importance of social atmosphere, local culture and traditions for any means of collective achievement.

== Publications ==
- Sport in Iceland: How Small Nations Achieve International Success (Routledge, 2017)
- Félagsstarf og Frístundir Íslenskra Unglinga (Community participation and leisure activities of Icelandic adolescents) (Æskan, 2000)
- An international football match experienced from within a 'working quarantine' – a photographic journey (Taylor & Francis, 2021)
