= Stöð 3 (1995) =

- Country: Iceland
- Network: Stöð 2

Ownership
- Owner: Sýn

History
- Launched: 24 November 1995
- Closed: February 1997

Links
- Website: Official Site

Stöð 3 was an Icelandic television channel which launched on 24 November 1995, but shut down in February 1997, when it merged with Stöð 2 and Sýn.

Its owner was Íslenska sjónvarpið hf, whose shareholders were Morgunblaðið's publisher Árvakur, Nýherji, Sambíóin, Japis and Texti; in total, there were 15 shareholders, none of which held more than 10% of the shares. Its first administrative director was Úlfar Steindórsson, followed by Heimir Karlsson (who took over in August 1996) and its last was Magnús E. Kristjánsson.

== Background and history ==
The plan to create the channel began in 1988, when Ísfilm hf showed interest. Ísfilm was owned by SÍS, Haust hf (owned by Indriði G. Þorsteinsson, Jóns Hermannssonar and Ágústs Guðmundssonar, Almenna bókafélagið, Dagblaðið Tíminn, Frjáls fjölmiðlun hf and Jón Aðalsteinn Jónsson. Ísfilm originally had Morgunblaðið and Reykjavík's respective publishing companies. But Ísfilm was never involved in the channel's operations, because of negotiations involving the possibility of using the same decoders as Stöð 2, which never came into fruition. Seven years later, Íslenska sjónvarpið revived the idea of Stöð 3. There were constant problems since the Ísfilm plan, mainly to obtain its own decoders and subscribers.

This situation persisted after November 1995, with the definitive launch of the channel, hampering potential income. Its output largely consisted of international entertainment, mainly American, but also relayed content from other channels, such as CNN International, MTV, Discovery Channel and Eurosport.

In October 1996, the owner filed for administration and sold it to Íslensk margmiðlun hf. A scandal erupted in January 1997 in which five Stöð 2 breached Stöð 3 subscriber data. The following month, Stöð 2 announced the merger of Stöð 3 and its shutdown. On 25 February 1997, Steingrímur J. Sigfússon, voiced his concern for the merger.
