= FM 957 =

FM 957 may refer to:

- FM 957 (Icelandic Radio Station), an Icelandic Radio Station
- FM 957, a Farm to Market road in Texas
