= Stöð 2 Sport =

Sýn Sport
- Network: Sýn

Ownership
- Owner: Sýn

History
- Former names: Stöð 2 Sport

Links
- Website: http://www.stod2sport.is/

Stöð 2 Sport was an Icelandic television channel that broadcast a wide variety of different sports in Iceland, operated by Stöð 2. Stöð 2 Sport is only broadcast in Iceland and only in Icelandic.

In June 2025 it was rebranded into Sýn Sport.

== Sports shown ==
Stöð 2 Sport offers a wide variety of live sports to choose from including most broadcast list first.

- Basketball Men's Domino's League, Women's Domino's League, NBA and Spanish Liga ACB
- Boxing World Championship boxing
- Football, UEFA Champions League, UEFA Cup, Spanish La Liga, English FA Cup, English League Cup, Icelandic Premier League, Icelandic National Team away games, all English National Team games and other top international matches.
- Golf, PGA Tour, European Tour, The Ryder Cup, US Open, The Masters, Players Championship, Icelandic Tour.
- Handball European Champions League and German Bundesliga
- Poker Poker After Dark, World Poker Tour and World Series of Poker
- Motocross
- NFL
- Tennis Wimbledon
- UFC Ultimate Fighting Championship

== Football matches ==
Stöð 2 Sport shows football matches from a variety of different leagues and tournaments including the

- (Europe) Champions League (UEFA)
- (Spain) La Liga
- (Union of South American Nations) Copa América (CONMEBOL)
- (England) FA Cup (FA)
- (England) League Cup (EFL)
- (Europe) European Qualifiers (UEFA)
- (Iceland) Besta deild karla (KSI)
- (Europe) Europa League (UEFA)
- (Europe) Super Cup (UEFA)
- (United Nations) International friendlies
- (England) Premier League
- (Italy) Serie A (FIGC)
- (United Nations) World Cup (FIFA)

== Additional Channels ==
Stöð 2 Sport provide additional channels for when multiple events are ongoing, these are:

- Stöð 2 Sport 2 HD
- Stöð 2 Sport 3 HD
- Stöð 2 Sport 4 HD
- Stöð 2 Sport 5
- Stöð 2 Sport 6
