= Stöð 2 Bíó =

Icelandic television station

Stöð 2 Bíó is an Icelandic pay television channel owned by Sýn, the biggest media corporation in Iceland. The channel runs classic and new movies and TV shows in Icelandic as well as in other languages with Icelandic subtitles. They also offer livestreams and clip sharing to their customers.

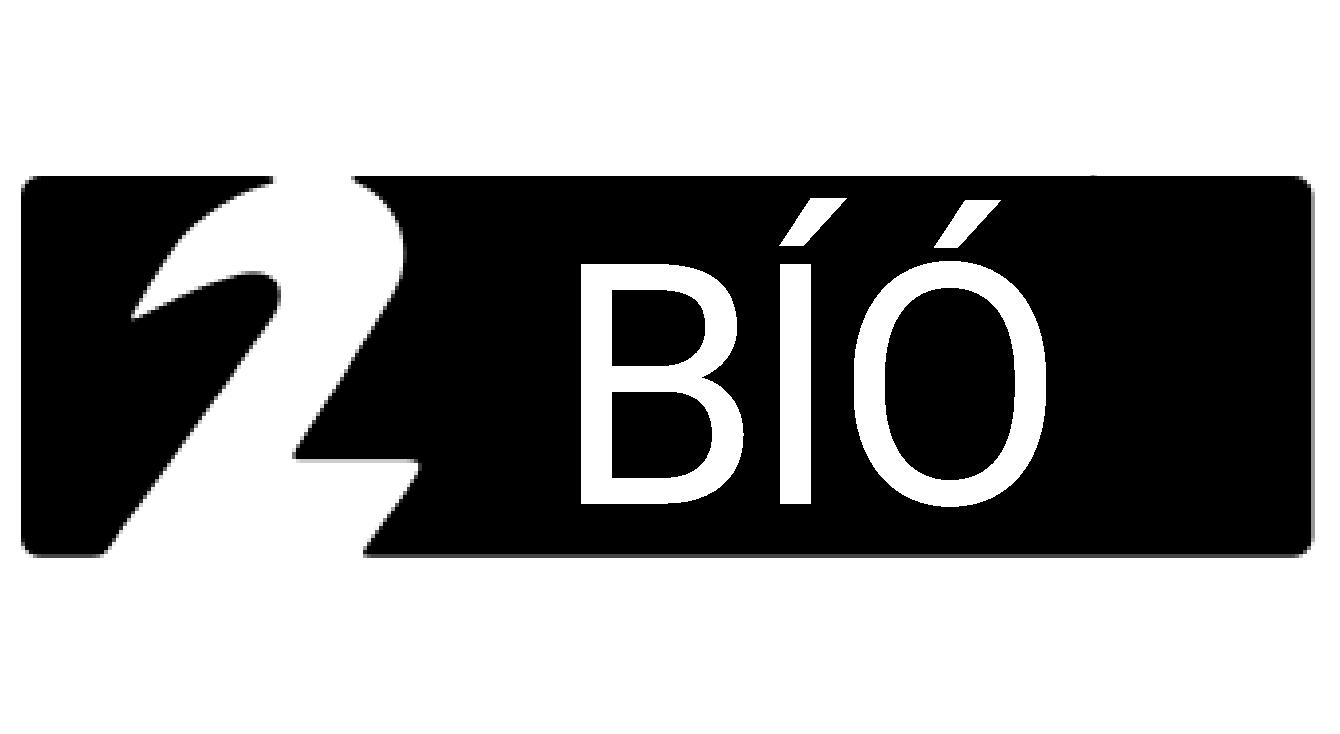
The logo for stöð 2 bíó
