= Sjáumst með Silvíu Nótt =

Icelandic television series

Sjáumst með Silvíu Nótt ("See You with Sylvia Night", international title: The Silvia Night Show) is an Icelandic satirical television series in the vein of characters such as Ali G and Erpur Eyvindsson's character Johnny Naz. In it, Ágústa Eva Erlendsdóttir (who played the titular Silvía Night) interviewed ordinary people, in Iceland and abroad. She rose to prominence in 2006 upon taking part in the 2006 Eurovision Song Contest. A follow-up series based on her Eurovision experience was subsequently produced. The series aired on Skjareinn.

The first episode was broadcast on 2 June 2005. In it, it is revealed that Silvia Night had a longtime dream of directing her own TV show. She lives in Arnarnes and her family lives as jet-setters. In an episode broadcast around Christmas, she wore a ring about the size of her hand. Several episodes of the series covered the character's materialist lifestyle.

In November, Silvía Nótt was awarded Television Personality of the Year at the 7th Edda Awards.

In May 2007, producer Gaukur Úlfarsson announced that he was making an English-language version (The Silvia Night Show) based on her Eurovision career for exporting purposes, and received proposals from several networks, such as Sweden's TV4.
