= Vodafone Iceland =

Telecommunications company in Iceland

Fjarskipti hf.
- Trade name: Vodafone Iceland
- Industry: Telecommunications
- Founded: September 7, 2005; 20 years ago
- Defunct: June 12, 2025
- Headquarters: Reykjavík, Iceland
- Products: Telephone, Internet, Television
- Owner: Sýn (branding licensed from Vodafone)
- Website: vodafone.is

Vodafone Iceland was an Icelandic telecommunications brand owned by the Icelandic company Sýn. Previously known as Fjarskipti hf., Vodafone á Íslandi and Og Vodafone ehf. The Vodafone Group franchised the brand and associated advertising styles, however had no controlling interest in the company. It was the first official partner network to hold the Vodafone brand.

In June 2025, the Vodafone Iceland brand was discontinued and replaced by Sýn.

== History and services ==
Vodafone Iceland offered mobile (2G/3G/4G/5G), fixed-line services as well as DSL and fiber Internet services to individuals and companies. It also provided a managed multicast IPTV and pay television services over digital terrestrial television, DVB-T2.

Vodafone Iceland previously ran Digital Iceland, the MMDS broadcasting system for the 365 corporation, from the 22 November 2006, until it was closed in 2017.

In 2014, the Icelandic public broadcaster RÚV, signed an agreement with Vodafone Iceland to run a shared system of DVB-T/T2 multiplexes to serve all of Iceland, facilitating the digital switchover. Vodafone Iceland, now Sýn, operates, the DVB digital transmission system by contract until 2028 and all RÚV channels are free-to-air, while customers can subscribe to pay-tv packages to access commercial channels by use of a CI Access Module, however distribution through IPTV is more popular.

Vodafone Iceland also operated an Internet Exchange Point in cooperation with Síminn, called Múli-IXP.

== See also ==
- Sýn (media corporation)
- Internet in Iceland
- Telecommunications in Iceland
