= ISTV =

Brazilian television station

ISTV (acronym for Ilha do Sol TV) is a Brazilian television station based in Guarujá, in the state of São Paulo. It operates on digital UHF channel 36. With an educational purpose, it belongs to Sistema On de Comunicações LTDA.

Since the station began its activities in 2004 until October 2015, it was affiliated with Canal Futura. From October 17, 2015, to July 12, 2018, the station became affiliated with Rede Brasil de Televisão, and on March 25, 2019, it was renamed ISTV.

Currently, the station has terrestrial coverage in the state of São Paulo, in Baixada Santista, Litoral Norte, Vale do Ribeira, and Ribeirão Preto, as well as in the state of Minas Gerais, in Juiz de Fora and Uberaba.

The company is led by CEO Claudio Fernando de Aguiar, an administrator who has held the position for the past 10 years.

== Stations ==
Station	City	Channel
ISTV Juiz de Fora	Juiz de Fora	12
ISTV Uberaba	Uberaba	5

=== Relay stations ===
Minas Gerais:

- São João Nepomuceno (Channel 12)
- Uberaba (Channel 30)

São Paulo:

- Bertioga (Channel 13)
- Cananéia (Channel 30)
- Caraguatatuba (Channel 44)
- Cubatão (Channel 44)
- Dumont (Channel 49)
- Guarujá (Channel 36)
- Iguape (Channel 30)
- Ilhabela (Channel 44)
- Jardinópolis (Channel 49)
- Miracatu (Channel 30)
- Mongaguá (Channel 36)
- Praia Grande (Channel 36)
- Ribeirão Preto (Channel 49)
- Santos (Channel 36)
- São Sebastião (Channel 44)
- São Vicente (Channel 36)
- Serrana (Channel 49)
- Ubatuba (Channel 30)

== Transmission via Ku band ==
In early 2022, the station expressed to ANATEL its desire to be broadcast on satellite television and to enter the Ku-band range, the so-called new parabolic.

On July 28 of the same year, the station's signal began to be captured nationally. The transmitting satellite is the Embratel StarOne D2.
