= ÍNN =

Icelandic TV channel

Íslands Nýjasta Nýtt (ÍNN)
- Type: Broadcast and television
- Country: Iceland
- Availability: National; international, also via the Internet)
- Launch date: 2 October 2007
- Dissolved: 16 November 2017
- Official website: inntv.is

Íslands Nýjasta Nýtt (ÍNN) (English: Iceland's Newest of the New) was a privately owned, Icelandic television station, which launched on 2 October 2007. The channel was controlled by Ingvi Hrafn Jónsson, former news director of the Icelandic governmental TV station RÚV and Stöð 2.

ÍNN mainly broadcast talk shows about politics and daily life.

Among the original programs on the channel were: Hrafnaþing, Óli á Hrauni, Í nærveru sálar, Borgarlíf and Í kallfæri.

In October 2016, the station was bought by Pressan ehf. In September 2017, Frjáls Fjölmiðlun bought the station but in November the same year, it ceased broadcasting due to financial difficulties and went bankrupt.

== Sources ==
- Moody, Jonas (2008) Feature of the Week: Brave New Broadcast, Iceland Review online (30/06/2008) published first in Iceland Review, 2007 Winter issue IR 45.04 (Accessed March 2013)
