= &Privé HD =

Indian pay television channel

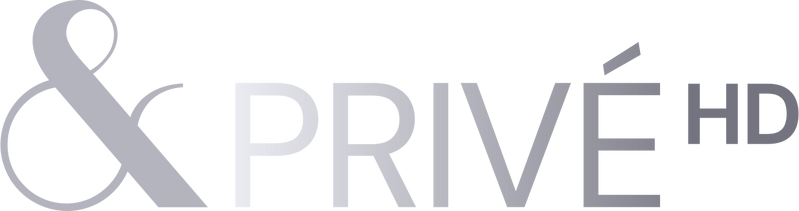
- Logo used in 2025 and 2026
- Broadcast area: Indian subcontinent
- Headquarters: Mumbai, Maharashtra, India

Programming
- Language: English
- Picture format: 1080i HDTV

Ownership
- Owner: Zee Entertainment Enterprises
- Sister channels: See list of channels owned by ZEEL

History
- Launched: 24 September 2017
- Closed: 31 March 2026; 5 months ago

&Privé HD was an Indian pay television channel, launched on 24 September 2017. It broadcast English movies. The channel was discontinued on 31 March 2026.
