= Ágústa Eva Erlendsdóttir =

Icelandic actress and singer (born 1982)

- Born: 28 July 1982 (age 43)
- Occupations: Actress; singer
- Known for: Silvía Night

Ágústa Eva Erlendsdóttir (pronounced [ˈauːkusta ˈɛːva ˈɛrlɛntsˌtouhtɪr̥]; born 28 July 1982) is an Icelandic actress and singer. She is best known for her portrayal of the controversial character Silvía Night in the television series Sjáumst með Silvíu Nótt and during the 2006 Eurovision Song Contest.

== Life and career ==
=== Acting ===
Ágústa Eva studied acting at the École Philippe Gaulier theatre school in Paris In 2005, she won an Edda Award for Best TV Personality and Best TV Show for her performance as Silvía Night. While in character, she was voted the sexiest woman in Iceland by listeners of the national radio station RÚV; as herself, she wound up in fourth place.

=== Music ===
Ágústa Eva was a member of the bands Kritikal Mazz and Ske, and in 2005 began a solo career.

== Selected acting work ==
=== Film ===
List of film appearances, with year, title, and role shown
Year	Film	Role	Notes
2006	Mýrin	Eva Lind	
2008	Sveitabrúðkaup	Auður	
2009	Epic Fail	Sigga	Short
2009	Góða Ferð		Short
2009	Bjarnfreðarson	Young Bjarnfreður	
2010	Tangled	Rapunzel	Icelandic voice
2011	Kurteist fólk	Margrét	
2011	Borgríki	Andrea	
2012	Ávaxtakarfan	Eva the Orange	
2013	Frozen	Queen Elsa	Icelandic voice
2014	Borgríki II: Blóð Hraustra Manna	Andrea	
2015	Frozen Fever	Queen Elsa	Icelandic voice
2017	I Remember You	Líf	
2017	Olaf's Frozen Adventure	Queen Elsa	Icelandic voice
2019	Frozen II	Queen Elsa	Icelandic voice
2021	Zack Snyder's Justice League	Young Icelandic Woman	

=== Television ===
List of television appearances, with year, title, and role shown
Year	Work	Role	Notes
2005	Sjáumst með Silvíu Nótt	Silvia Night	15 episodes
2017	Steypustöðin	Various characters	6 episodes
2019	Beforeigners	Urðr Sighvatsdóttir	6 episodes

== Discography ==
=== Singles ===
- "Þetta er nóg" (from Let It Go the Complete Set ("Frozen")) (2014)
- "Þegar Storminn Hefur Lægt" with Magni Ásgeirsson (2018)
