= Fréttablaðið =

Icelandic newspaper

- Type: Daily newspaper
- Format: Tabloid
- Owner: Torg ehf.
- Publisher: Jón Þórisson
- Editor: Sigmundur Ernir Rúnarsson
- Founded: 2001
- Ceased publication: 31 March 2023
- Political alignment: Centre-left
- Language: Icelandic
- Headquarters: Kalkofnsvegur 2, 101 Reykjavik, Iceland
- Circulation: 75,000 (as of February 2022)
- Website: frettabladid.is

Fréttablaðið (English: The Newspaper) was a free Icelandic newspaper. It was distributed five days per week. At its peak, it was the most read newspaper in Iceland.

== History and profile ==
Fréttablaðið was established in 2001. It was originally owned primarily by the media group 365. The paper was published six days per week, Monday — Saturday until September 2003, when its frequency was switched to daily. As of 2019, it was published six days per week again, and as of 2020, it was published five days per week. It is entirely funded by advertising.

Fréttablaðið has been described as siding politically with the Social Democratic Alliance (Samfylkingin) and for favouring Icelandic membership of the European Union. However, some of its editors have sided with the conservative Independence Party (Sjálfstæðisflokkurinn), and its former editor-in-chief and regular columnist is Independence Party's former leader and Prime Minister Þorsteinn Pálsson.

In the period of 2001–2002, the paper had a circulation of 70,000. In 2019, it had a circulation of 80,000. Forty percent of Iceland respondents to a Gallup survey stated that they read the paper.

In 2017, 365 Miðlar sold most of its assets to Fjarskipti ehf, the parent company of Vodafone Iceland, including the website visir.is. 365 Miðlar kept Fréttablaðið along with Glamour magazine and opened a new website, frettabladid.is. As of 2020, it was the sixth most popular website in Iceland. After the sale to fjarskipti, 365 Miðlar moved operations to Fréttablaðið, Glamour magazine and frettabladid.is under Torg ehf., its subsidiary.

In October 2019, Helgi Magnússon and other investors bought 365 Miðlar's shares in Torg ehf. Helgi had previously bought 50% of Torg ehf's stocks earlier in 2019. As a part of the sale, Ólöf Skaftadóttir stepped down as editor and was replaced with Jón Þórisson. After the sale, the new owners announced their plans to merge Fréttablaðið with the TV station Hringbraut.

In October 2020, the paper was accused of publishing fake news by the United States embassy in Iceland due to a report saying that the embassy's employees were asked to work despite one worker contracting COVID-19. In 2021 Torg ehf., the owner of the paper, received 81 million Icelandic krónas (about US$637,443) in subsidies issued to Icelandic media by the government of Iceland.

On 31 March 2023, the paper ceased publication and laid off all staff.

== See also ==
- List of newspapers in Iceland
- Stöð 2
- Bylgjan
