= National Funding Scheme =

British government charitable organisation

The National Funding Scheme (NFS) is a charitable organisation (charity number 1149800) in the United Kingdom providing fundraising advice, support and services to UK charities. The charity uses the DONATE brand name to deliver an integrated giving platform across text, online and contactless donation products.

Established in 2013 and initially for arts organisations, the scheme was broadened to all UK charities in 2015. DONATE's provision of SMS/text giving has increased following the closure of JustGiving's text platform on 31 March 2019.
