= Sigtið =

Icelandic comedy television show

Sigtið is an Icelandic comedy television show. The show is filmed in a mockumentary style showing the self-centered television show host Frímann Gunnarsson. Gunnarsson fails completely at running the show, despite his belief that it is the greatest television show ever made in Iceland. His idols are the world-renowned Joseph Blunden and Margaret Thatcher.

Gunnar Hansson plays the leading role of Frímann Gunnarsson along with several smaller parts. Friðrik Friðriksson and Halldór Gylfason play almost all other parts in the show.

The shows two seasons were aired in 2006 at the Icelandic television station Skjár einn.

- An Icelandic article about Sigtið.
- Frímann Gunnarsso n on Myspace.
