= Number field sieve =

Number field sieve (NFS) is an integer factorization method, it can be:

- General number field sieve (GNFS): Number field sieve for any integer
- Special number field sieve (SNFS): Number field sieve for integers of a certain special form
