= Nova TV (Iceland) =

Nova
- Country: Iceland

History
- Launched: 2007

Links
- Website: Official Site

Nova TV is a Live TV streaming service owned and operated by Nova. It has live programming from the major broadcast and cable brands in Iceland.

The streaming service is available to all residents of Iceland. It can be streamed via the Nova TV website on computers, or the Nova TV app on smartphones, tablets, Apple TV and Android TV.
