= Stöð 1 =

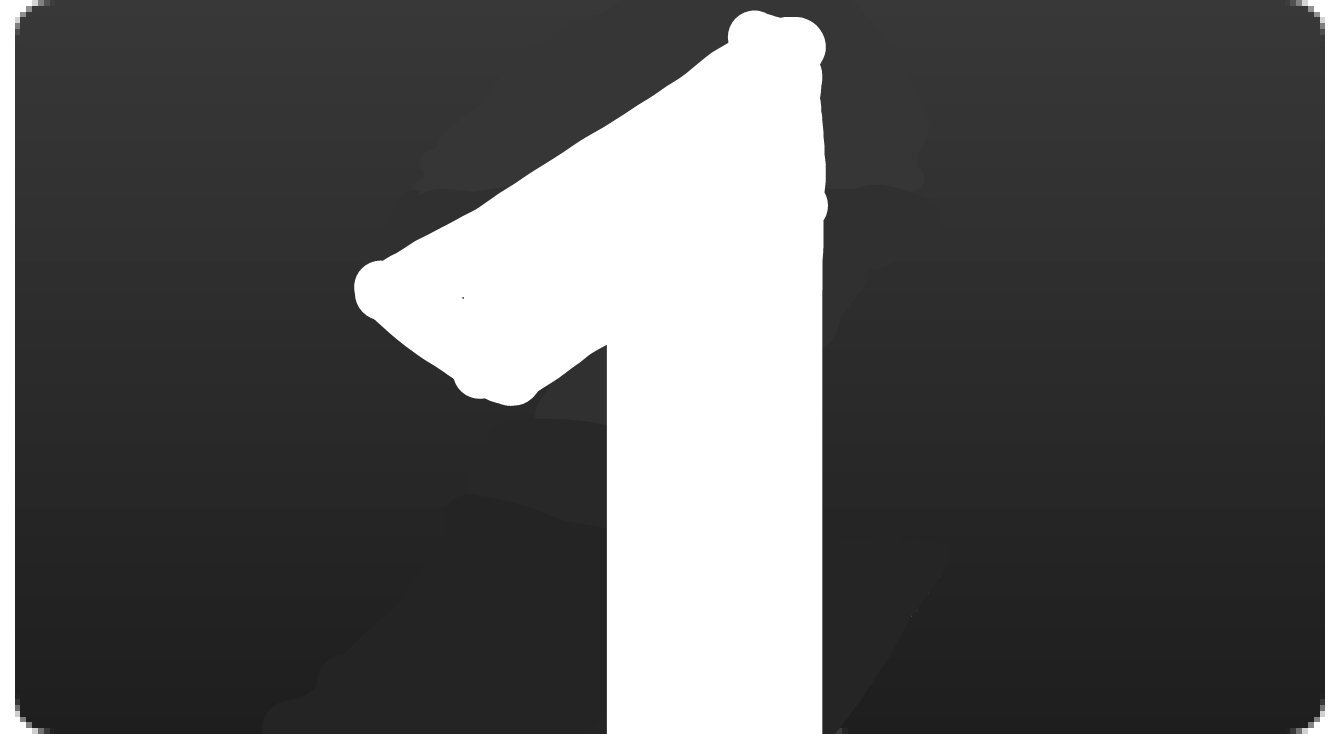
- Country: Iceland

History
- Launched: October 29, 2010

Links
- Website: Official Site

Stöð 1 was an Icelandic television channel launched free-to-air on October 29, 2010. The channel targeted a demographic between 25 and 55 years of age and was available to 98% of homes in Iceland. The channel aired various content mostly movies back-to-back. The channel also allowed viewers in Iceland to view the channel on digital television providers and from the official website stod1.is.
