= Stöð 2 Sport 2 =

Sýn Sport 2
- Network: Sýn

Ownership
- Owner: Sýn

History
- Former names: Sýn 2

Links
- Website: http://www.stod2sport2.is/

Sýn Sport 2 is an Icelandic sports channel that shows over 300 football games from the Premier League each season. It is the only channel in Iceland that has the right to show English League games. Stöð 2 Sport 2 was created ahead of the 2007/08 Football season as the Second purely English football station in Iceland, the competitor Skjarinn had already created such channel when they had the right to the English football for the 2005/6 season. Because many games in the English League start at the same time, Stöð 2 Sport 2 also shows games on Stöð 2 Sport extra 1, Stöð 2 Sport extra 2, Stöð 2 Sport extra 3, and Stöð 2 Sport extra 4. In the games shown in these extra stations commentary is in English.
