= Sjónvarp Símans =

- Country: Iceland

Ownership
- Owner: Síminn

History
- Launched: 20 October 1999
- Former names: SkjárEinn

Links
- Website: Official Site

Sjónvarp Símans (English: The Phone's Television), formerly SkjárEinn (ScreenOne), is an Icelandic television channel owned by Síminn.

Sjónvarp Símans broadcasts both Icelandic and foreign television shows. Since its foundation in 1999 it has aired crime, drama, reality and comedy television series. It is distributed by analogue over-the-air broadcast signal and also digitally via Síminn and Vodafone IPTV and Vodafone Digital Ísland.

Sjónvarp Símans used to be free to anyone living in Iceland but switched to a premium subscription channel in 2009. In 2015, after Skipti, the former parent company of Síminn and Skjárinn, merged with Síminn, the channel switched to a mixed subscription model. Watching the linear broadcast is free but a subscription option called Sjónvarp Símans Premium offers more content then the linear broadcast, such as a library of old shows and series, shows what have not been aired in the linear broadcast, movies and more. On 1 June 2016, the channel's name was changed from SkjárEinn to Sjónvarp Símans, to reflect the revolution the channel and Síminn itself had been through since the merger of Síminn and its sister companies.

== National productions made for SkjárEinn/Sjónvarp Símans ==
- 6 til sjö
- Allt í drasli (2005–2008, adaptation of How Clean is Your House?)
- Djúpa laugin
- The Voice Ísland
- Dýravinir
- Ertu skarpari en skólakrakki?
- Frægir í form
- Fyndnar fjölskyldumyndir (2009)
- GameTíví (2008–2014)
- Gegndrepa
- Innlit/útlit (2009)
- Johnny International
- Matarklúbburinn (2009)
- Nýtt útlit (2009)
- Sigtið
- Sjáumst með Silvíu Nótt
- Spjallið með Sölva (2009)
- Ha? (2011)

== See also ==
- RÚV
- Stöð 2
