= 365 (media corporation) =

Mass media company in Iceland

Coordinates: 64°08′04″N 21°54′18″W

365 Media
- Native name: 365 Miðlar hf.
- Formerly: Og fjarskipti
- Industry: Mass media
- Founded: 2003
- Headquarters: Reykjavík, Iceland
- Key people: Ingibjörg Stefanía Pálmadóttir (managing director)

365 was a media company in Iceland. At its peak, it was a mass media company and operated several TV and radio stations, and one newspaper. 365 also rebroadcast foreign television channels over its digital TV system.

It started broadcasting Bylgjan in 1986, Stöð 2 started in 1986, Stöð 2 Sport (Sýn) in 1995, Bíórásin in 1998, and it started publishing Fréttablaðið in 2001. In 2017, it sold most of its assets to Fjarskipti ehf, the parent company of Vodafone Iceland.

== History ==
Og fjarskipti was formed in 2003 through a merger of Íslandssími, Tal and Halló! (all telephone companies). During 2004 and early 2005, Og fjarskipti grew further by acquiring the two largest Icelandic Internet service provider's, Margmiðlun hf. and Lína.Net hf., as well as most of the Icelandic media company Norðurljós, making it the largest corporate network provider in Iceland, offering mobile and fixed telephony and high-quality data networking, with a large footprint in the residential broadband and TV market. In 2005 the name of Og fjarskipti changed to Dagsbrún.

As of March, 2006 Dagsbrún owned "...television and radio stations, a newspaper and a telecommunications company in Iceland and the Faroe Islands", and its Wyndeham stake marked the first time it showed interest in acquisition outside of its home market. At that time it consisted of following brands:

- Vodafone Iceland (telecommunications operator)
- 365 (media company)
- Sena (content owner and movie theatre operator)
- Wyndeham Press (UK based printing company)
- The Icelandic franchise of the Securitas security company
- Vodafone Faroe Islands (telecommunications operator on Faroe Islands)

Subsequently, Dagsbrún became 365 and split its media companies into two subsidiaries: 365 ljósvakamiðlar and 365 prentmiðlar, each with a specialized focus.

In 2015, 365 Miðlar bought the Icelandic telecommunications company Tal and merged it into its operations.

In 2017, 365 Miðlar sold most of its assets to Fjarskipti ehf, the parent company of Vodafone Iceland, including the website visir.is. 365 Miðlar kept Fréttablaðið and opened a new website for it on frettabladid.is.

In October 2019, Helgi Magnússon and other investors bought 365 Miðlar's shares in Torg ehf., the publishing company behind Fréttablaðið. Helgi had previously bought 50% of Torg ehf's stocks earlier in 2019.

== See also ==
- Fréttablaðið
