= FM 957 (Icelandic radio station) =

Radio station in Iceland

FM 957 or FM is an Icelandic radio station. Owned by Sýn, FM 957 broadcasts on 95.7 MHz, and plays the latest in pop music.
