= Bylgjan =

Icelandic radio station

- Type: Radio station
- Country: Iceland
- Availability: National; International (online)
- Owner: Sýn
- Launch date: 28 August 1986; 39 years ago
- Official website: www.bylgjan.is

Bylgjan (The Wave) is an Icelandic radio station, run by the media company Sýn. Launched in 1986, it was the first privately owned radio station in Iceland. Bylgjan broadcasts nationwide through a network of FM transmitters (98.9 MHz is the channel's main frequency in Reykjavík) and is also available via online streaming.

== See also ==
- Stöð 2
- Fréttablaðið
