= Sýn (media corporation) =

Icelandic mass media company

Sýn hf.
- Logo used since 2025
- Formerly: Sýn (1995–2008); Íslandssími (1998–2003); Og Fjarskipti (2003–2011); Fjarskipti (2011–2018)
- Type: Public
- Traded as: Nasdaq Iceland: SYN
- Industry: Mass media
- Founded: 1995; 31 years ago
- Headquarters: Reykjavík, Iceland,
- Products: Telephone, Internet, Television, Radio, News media
- Website: syn.is

Sýn (Icelandic pronunciation: [siːn], lit. 'Vision') is a telecommunications and mass media company in Iceland. The company operates a telecommunications division including 4G/5G services, the online newspaper Vísir.is, and several television stations including Sýn (TV channel) and radio stations Bylgjan and FM 957. It also rebroadcasts foreign television channels over its digital TV systems, over IPTV and DVB-T2. In 2022, it was the largest mass media company in Iceland. Sýn is listed on the Icelandic stock exchange.

Sýn previously operated the Stöð 2 and Vodafone Iceland brands in Iceland.

== History ==
Sýn is a conglomeration of multiple Icelandic telecommunication and media entities acquired throughout the 2000s. The brand name Sýn was originally used for a new television channel in 1995. At the time it mostly showed sporting events and raunchy material. In 2008 the Sýn brand was acquired by Stöð 2.

The telecommunications entity of the current Sýn was founded in 1998 as Íslandssími ([ˈistlan(t)sˌsiːmɪ], lit. 'Iceland Telephone'), becoming the first competitor to the government owned Landssíminn on the phone market. In 2002, it merged with competitor Halló-Frjáls fjarskipti under the Íslandssími name. Shortly later it bought competitor Tal and rebranded as Og Fjarskipti. Later in 2003, it became Og Vodafone. This was later rebranded as Vodafone Iceland.

Sýn used the Vodafone Iceland brand for its telecommunications division but ceased using it in June 2025. Although it used the Vodafone brand and trademark, Vodafone Group owned no interest in the company, but rather franchised the brand and associated advertising styles.

Vodafone Iceland previously ran Digital Iceland, the MMDS broadcasting system for the 365 corporation, from the 22 November 2006, until it was closed in 2017.

In 2014, the Icelandic public broadcaster RÚV, signed an agreement with then Vodafone Iceland (now Sýn), to run a shared system of DVB-T/T2 multiplexes to serve all of Iceland, facilitating the digital switchover. Sýn operates the DVB digital transmission system by contract until 2028 and all RÚV channels are free-to-air, while customers can subscribe to pay-TV packages to access commercial channels by use of a CI Access Module, however distribution through IPTV is more popular.

In 2017, Vodafone Iceland bought most of the assets of 365 Miðlar, including Stöð 2. As part of the reorganisation, in 2018 the parent corporation was rebranded as Sýn, reusing a brand acquired almost a decade earlier.

=== Sýn rebrand ===
In June 2025, the company discontinued the Stöð 2 and Vodafone Iceland brands. At this time, all of its services and brands were unified under the Sýn brand.

== Telecommunications ==
Sýn offers mobile (4G/5G), fixed-line services as well as DSL and fiber Internet services to individuals and companies. It also provides a managed multicast IPTV and pay television services over digital terrestrial television, DVB-T2.

Sýn also operates an Internet Exchange Point in cooperation with Síminn, called Múli-IXP.

== Television ==
- Sýn Sjónvarp (replaced Stöð 2)
- Sýn Sport (replaced Stöð 2 Sport)
- Sýn Sport 2 (replaced Stöð 2 Sport 2)
- Sýn Sport 3
- Sýn Sport 4
- Sýn Sport 5

== Radio ==
- Bylgjan
  - 80s Bylgjan (internet radio)
  - Gull Bylgjan – 90.9
  - Létt Bylgjan – 96.7 (previously: Létt 96.7)
- FM 957 – 95.7
- X-ið 977 – 97.7
