= Stöð 2 =

- Type: Pay television channel
- Country: Iceland
- Network: 365 (media corporation); Sýn

Programming
- Language: Icelandic
- Picture format: 1080i HDTV (downscaled to 576i for the SDTV feed)

Ownership
- Owner: Sýn

History
- Launched: 9 October 1986
- Closed: 12 June 2025
- Replaced by: Sýn (TV channel)

Links
- Website: www.stod2.is

Stöð 2 (literally Channel 2) was a pay television channel in Iceland. It was launched in October 9th 1986 as Iceland's first independent television broadcaster. It was later part of the 365 corporation, which was eventually acquired by Sýn.

In 2025, the Stöð 2 brand was retired and replaced by Sýn, including all sub-channels.

== History ==
In the 1980s, television in Iceland only consisted of a single channel from the public broadcaster, RÚV. Political and general view towards independent television began to change and in 1985, new laws were approved allowing private broadcasting. Stöð 2, operated by Íslenska Sjónvarpsfélagið, began broadcasts in 1986.

=== New media laws of 1986 ===
During the big BSRB strike in the fall of 1984, almost all of RÚV's activities shut down and several illegal radio stations sprung up. As a result, consideration was given to revising the broadcasting laws during the tenure of Minister of Education, Ragnhildur Helgadóttir. A new law, which allowed private radio and television stations, was approved by Alþingi on June 13, 1985, and came into effect at the beginning of 1986. Until that time, there had been two radio stations and one television station operating in Iceland, Rás 1 and Rás 2 and Sjónvarpið (RÚV).

=== Start of Stöð 2 ===
Stöð 2 went on the air on 9 October 1986, as a pay television station over VHF with a scrambled program where the subscriber had to buy a code number and enter a video code to unscramble the broadcast. Broadcasts were limited to the Reykjavík Capital Region initially but were later expanded.

Television presenter Jón Óttar and Vala Matt were prominent on the screen during the first days of the station. The line-up was made up of imported entertainment, dramatised Icelandic entertainment and news. It was difficult to get investors to participate in the company to begin with.

At the beginning of 1987, there were about 5,000 subscribers, but by the end of the year there had been almost 30,000. At the same time, the number of employees increased and the station began to match RÚV in terms of programmers and reporters, which was considered unheard of. In 1999 the brands Stöð 2, Bylgjan and Íslenska Útvarpsfélgið under Norðurljós.

=== Unification of the brand ===
Stöð 2's encrypted VHF broadcasts ended in 2011.

Many sister stations were operated under the same company, but in 2008 they were all united under the name of Stöð 2, thus the sports station Sýn became Stöð 2 Sport. Sirkus became 'Stöð 2 Extra and Fjölvarpið became Stöð 2 Fjölvarp, on the other hand, Stöð 2 Bíó kept its name.

In 2017, Fjarskipti hf. (Vodafone Iceland) acquired 365.

From 2021 to 2024, the Stöð 2 evening news programme was also encrypted and only available to paying subscribers.

=== Retirement of brand ===
On June 12, 2025, Sýn retired the Stöð 2 brand, including all sub-stations, to be replaced by Sýn. Stöð 2 was effectively replaced by the Sýn (TV channel), a free-to-air channel. In September 2026, Sýn discontinued its evening television news service, including Ísland í dag.

== Programming ==
=== Recurring ===
- Fréttir, the station's flagship evening news program, every evening at 6:30 pm
- Ísland í dag, a daily magazine covering various aspects of life in Iceland such as politics, culture and entertainment. It also includes sport, news and weather

=== Original programming ===
- Spaugstofan (comedy)
- Vegferð (comedy)
- Black Sands (drama)
- Réttur, a legal drama series
- Viltu vinna milljon? (Icelandic version of Who Wants to Be a Millionaire?)
- Idol stjörnuleit (Icelandic version of Pop Idol and related shows)
- The X Factor (Icelandic version)
- Dagvaktin (sitcom)
- Fangavaktin, a comedy series continuation of Næturvaktin and Dagvaktin
- Næturvaktin (sitcom)
- Fóstbræður (sketch comedy)
- Sjálfstætt fólk, an interview and talk show hosted by Jón Ársæll Þórðarson
- Eldsnöggt með Jóa Fel, cooking show
- Logi í Beinni, an Icelandic Talk show hosted by Logi Bergmann Eiðsson
- Ástríður
- Auddi og sveppi
- Algjör sveppi
- Einu sinni var...', "Once Upon A Time", a history show
- Strákarnir, comedy
- Það var lagið, talent show
- Meistarinn, quiz show, hosted by Logi Bergmann Eiðsson
- Stelpurnar, sketch show
- Veggfóður, show about design and lifestyle. Hosted by Vala Matt and Hálfdán Steinþórsson
- Réttur
- Pressa
- Silfur Egils, Sunday talkshow with interviews of those who made the news in the past week
- Kompás, A weekly newsmagazine
- Svínasúpan

Running times

- 1986–1988 opens at 8:00 and close at 23:00.
- 1988–1995 opens at 6:00 and close at 0:00.
- 1995–2024 open 24 hours.

== See also ==
- Sýn (TV channel)
- Sýn (media corporation)
- 365 (media corporation)
- Television in Iceland
- Mass media in Iceland
