= Neo-feudalism =

Theoretical rebirth of antique governance

Neo-feudalism or new feudalism is a theorized contemporary rebirth of policies of governance, economy, and public life, reminiscent of those which were present in many feudal societies. Such aspects include, but are not limited to: Unequal and legal protections for common people and for nobility, dominance of societies by a small and powerful elite, a lack of social mobility, and relations of lordship and serfdom between the elite and the people, where the former are rich and the latter poor.

== History and definitions ==
Steven Spitzer and Andrew T. Scull stated that the company towns which developed during the gilded age in the United States were a form of feudalism due to the paternalistic relationship between captains of industry and the workers who relied on their employer for nearly every aspect of their life. However, the economic shift from extractive and centralized industries into an economy based on the production of consumer goods made the company town economically nonviable. A professional managerial class and decentralized corporations replaced the captains of industry. Transportation became much cheaper for the working class and by the beginning of the second world war company towns were much less important to societal structure.

Jürgen Habermas used the term Refeudalisierung ("refeudalisation") in his 1962 The Structural Transformation of the Public Sphere to criticise the privatisation of the forms of communication that he believed had produced an Enlightenment-era public sphere. Correspondingly, in 1992 Immanuel Wallerstein expressed views on global development, listing neo-feudalism among three other variants. By neo-feudalism, Wallerstein referred to autarky regions with a localised hierarchy and hi-tech goods available only for the elite.

Clifford Shearing and Philip Stenning expanded on Spitzer and Scull's criminological view of neo-feudalism in the early 1980s. They state that one of the differences between private and public security is the focus on prevention. Rather than apprehending law breakers, private security forces implement surveillance practices which prevent crimes on the private property they are employed to protect. These private forces specifically target a class they term delinquent prior to suspicion of actually committing a crime on the basis that targeting the delinquent class aligns with the profit seeking reward system. They note that one of the motivations for a private police force is that public police do not have unremitting access to private property. This hinders their ability to prevent crime motivating the creation of private security. They evoke Michel Foucault's disciplinary society to explain that the larger impact of private security forces tends to go unnoticed because the security structure avoids violence, employs mundane and low skill methods, and does not operate on ethos. Regardless, society is powerfully shaped because the people know they are being watched.

Shearing and Stenning criticize Spitzer and Scull's theory for being too focused on economics. Instead they note that the preference for private security arises anywhere there are private land holdings large enough to form a quasi-public space that is actually on private land. This occurs at large corporations, residential complexes, universities, and religious institutions. One common limitation on private security forces is that states are prohibited from employing them. In the United States, this is regulated via the Anti-Pinkerton Act of 1893 but similar regulation exists in other states. These forces are also typically licensed by the state with regulators maintaining broad authority to revoke licenses for any particular private security force.

According to Les Johnston, Clifford Shearing's theoretical approach of neo-feudalism has been influential. Shearing "use[s] this term in a limited sense to draw attention to the emergence of domains of mass private property that are 'gated' in a variety of ways". Lucia Zedner responds that this use of neo-feudalism is too limited in scope; Shearing's comparison does not draw parallels with earlier governance explicitly enough. Zedner prefers more definitive endorsements.

Marina Caparini has argued, that the transformation of security from a public good into a private one via widespread use of private security forces rather than public police forces can erode state legitimacy. She points to security conditions in states such as South Africa where this may have occurred prior to 2006. In practice, these private security forces exclude much of the public creating a potential neo-feudal condition.

Authors such as Jorge Majfud, Peter Phillips, Sean McFate, Joel Kotkin, Robert Kuttner & Katherine V. W. Stone, Ben Norton, Jonathan Bluestein and Quinn Slobodian, have written extensively about this topic. In their view, neo-feudalism is a feature of social power: economic, political and martial alike. They define the neo-feudal sovereigns as those who, while not directly referred to as lords, aristocrats, kings or emperors, still hold an equivalent power in a modern sense. That is, people who are not subject to everyday laws, can create their own laws to an extent, dominate large markets, employ immense swathes of individuals, have the means to hold a private military force, wield the economic might equivalent of entire nations, and own assets, especially real-estate, on a massive scale. Those authors both criticize this phenomenon, and sometimes propose social and economic solutions for it.

Bruce Baker has written that Neo-feudalism entails an order defined by commercial interests and administered in large areas. Yet he claims that this does not fully describe the extent of cooperation between state and non-state policing. The significance of the comparison to feudalism, for Randy Lippert and Daniel O'Connor, is that corporations have power similar to states' governance powers. Similarly, Sighard Neckel has argued that the rise of financial-market-based capitalism in the later twentieth century has represented a 'refeudalisation' of the economy.

Jodi Dean has written about neo-feudalism as 'a more dangerous form of capitalism', based on her analysis of Marx, and the ideas of Yanis Varoufakis and others. She has used neo-feudalism to redefine the 'Marxist struggle' of modern times, explaining how it ought to lead to a different kind of a social revolution.

Certain anarchist-Marxist theorists and economists, and others, have criticized the term technofeudalism (one proposed form of neo-feudalism), as being inaccurate and misleading. Their core argument is that technofeudalism is not different in its essential mechanics and philosophy from traditional capitalism.

== In popular culture and literature ==
After the 2008 financial crisis, American technology billionaire Nick Hanauer stated that "our country [i.e., the United States] is rapidly becoming less a capitalist society and more a feudal society". His views were echoed by, amongst others, the Icelandic billionaire Björgólfur Thor Björgólfsson. The idea that the early 21st century boom and 2008 Icelandic financial crisis saw the country returning to feudal structures of power was also expressed by a range of Icelandic novelists, among them Sigrún Davíðsdóttir in Samhengi hlutanna, Bjarni Bjarnason in Mannorð, Bjarni Harðarson in Sigurðar saga fóts, Böðvar Guðmundsson in Töfrahöllin, and Steinar Bragi in Hálendið: Skáldsaga.

Similar ideas are found in some Anglophone fiction. For example, Frank Herbert's Dune series of novels is set in the distant future with a neo-feudalistic galactic empire known as the Imperium. In these novels, after a series of wars known as the Butlerian Jihad, humanity has come to prohibit all kinds of "thinking machine technology", even its simpler forms. Subsequently, the political balance of power in the Dune Universe gradually became dominated by a myriad of royal houses, each dominating one or several planets. Albeit operating in the distant future, the social and political dynamics of said royal houses are similar in many respects to those previously seen in medieval times.

In David Brin's near-future science fiction novel Existence, American politicians campaign on legally transitioning the United States into a neo-feudalist society.

In the year 2020, head of the World Economic Forum, Klaus Schwab published a book titled COVID-19: The Great Reset. The book argues that the COVID-19 pandemic is an opportunity for politicians and governments to change the world's economies, societies and structures of government, by introducing a system of "Stakeholder Capitalism", doing so via the guidelines of a plan known as 'The Great Reset'. Schwab also refers to his goals as "The Fourth Industrial Revolution". Other authors have criticized The Great Reset as being a form of neo-feudalism.

== See also ==
- Anarcho-capitalism
- Ascribed status
- Dark Enlightenment
- Neo-medievalism
- Neotribalism
- Organic crisis
- Songbun
- Jim Crow economy
- Bullshit Jobs ("managerial feudalism")
