= Útrásarvíkingur =

Útrásarvíkingur ([ˈuːtrausarˌviːciŋkʏr̥], 'raiding viking', plural útrásarvíkingar) is a neologism coined during the early twenty-first century Icelandic banking boom (the so-called Icelandic outvasion) as a term for Icelandic financiers who rose to prominence with a string of high-profile, credit-fuelled purchases of European businesses. The concept that it denotes, which imagines the financier as a modern-day Viking, has been the subject of extensive scholarly research investigating its relationship with Icelandic nationalism and the causes of the 2008–2011 Icelandic financial crisis.

== Literal meaning ==
Út means 'out'; rás, in this context, means 'a rush, race, sprint, expansion'; and útrás correspondingly means outward rush. This term útrás was used in Icelandic to denote Icelanders' acquisitions of foreign assets during the early twenty-first century banking boom. This word has often been rendered into English in the Icelandic media using the calque outvasion. An útrásarvíkingur is, then, an 'outvasion viking' or, more loosely, 'raiding viking'. It has also been rendered 'venture viking' (in a reference to venture capital).

== Cultural meaning ==
The idea of the útrásarvíkingar has been seen as an important example of medievalism and nationalism in Icelandic culture, adverting to the imagined golden age of the Settlement of Iceland, during which Iceland is popularly imagined to have been a free and just society. The most prominent commentator on these lines before the collapse of Iceland's banks was Kristín Loftsdóttir, who argued that by appealing to powerful nationalist sentiments in Icelandic culture, the image of the útrásarvíkingur helped to shield risk-taking financiers from criticism. Extensive further research was published in the wake of the Crash.

The pre-eminent example of an útrásarvíkingur came to be seen as Björgólfur Thor Björgólfsson, who for a time was the effective owner of Landsbanki.

One invocation of the concept of the 'venture viking' that gained particular infamy in the wake of the Crash was a speech by the then President of Iceland, Ólafur Ragnar Grímsson to the Walbrook Club in London on 3 May 2005, in which Ólafur Ragnar attributed Iceland’s success in business to an innate entrepreneurial spirit deriving directly from Icelanders’ viking ancestors.

== History of the term ==
The term víkingur traditionally simply meant 'pirate' in Icelandic, but in útrásarvíkingur referred to vikings, a figment of modern constructions of the medieval past, imagined as ethnically Scandinavian, manly, and nobly savage. The term seems to have been coined quite late in the Icelandic banking boom: the earliest attestation in the online corpus of Icelandic newspapers and periodicals Tímarit.is comes from June 1, 2005. It seems to have been inspired by English-language news reporting figuring Icelandic financiers as Vikings, and it has been suggested that 'origins of the term lie primarily in language of violent masculinity developed on Wall Street around the beginning of the 1980s and soon adopted into everyday English — usages such as "to make a killing", meaning "to make a lot of money".'

== Appearances in popular culture ==
A number of novelists wrote works satirising the medievalist pretensions of the útrásarvíkingar, particularly by reimagining the útrásarvíkingar not as vikings but as feudal knights. They include Bjarni Harðarson (Sigurðar saga fóts: Íslensk riddarasaga), Böðvar Guðmundsson (Töfrahöllin), and Andri Snær Magnason (Tímakistan). Meanwhile, Bjarni Bjarnason subverted Björgólfur Thor Björgólfsson's enthusiasm for identifying himself with the god Þór by associating him instead with the more sinister god Óðinn in Mannorð.
