= Land of opportunity =

Land of opportunity or land of opportunities may refer to:

== Government and politics ==
- Land of Opportunity, a nickname for the United States, expressing belief in socioeconomic mobility in the United States
- Land of Opportunity, a former nickname of Arkansas, United States
- Land of Opportunity, a land policy of South Africa's Democratic Alliance party
- Embu County, Kenya, whose motto is "The Land of Opportunities"

== Music ==
=== Albums ===
- Land of Opportunity, a 1986 album by EIEIO, published by Frontier Records

=== Songs ===
- "Land of Opportunities", from the 1946 musical Park Avenue
- "Land of Opportunity", by Charlie Daniels, from the 1974 album Way Down Yonder
- "Land of Opportunity", by Steven Curtis Chapman, from the 1996 album Signs of Life
- "Land of Opportunity", by A Great Big World, from the 2014 album Is There Anybody Out There?

== Visual media ==
=== Film ===
- Land of Opportunity, a 2007 documentary film
- The Land of Opportunity, a 1920 film starring Ralph Ince
- Land of Opportunity, a 1949–1950 documentary film series directed by William Witney
- USA: Land of Opportunities, a film series by Lars von Trier

=== Television ===
- "Land of Opportunity", a 1996 episode of The Marshal
- "Land of Opportunity", a 2006 episode of Close to Home
- "Land of Opportunity", a 2017 episode of Hetty Feather
- Land of Opportunities (TV series), a documentary series by Dubai 33

== Other ==
- Land tækifæranna ("Land of opportunities"), a 2008 Icelandic crime fiction novel
- Land of Opportunity: The Entrepreneurial Spirit in America, a 1986 book by Donald Lambro
- A Land of Opportunity, a part of the 2019 game Red Dead Online

== See also ==
- Global Social Mobility Index, a ranking of intergenerational social mobility in different countries
- Land of Freedom (disambiguation)
- London streets are paved with gold
