= Uppheimar =

Publishing house in Iceland

Uppheimar ehf was an Icelandic publishing house based in the town of Akranes, which operated from 2001 to 2015.

== History ==
The company was established 11 January 2001 by the husband and wife team Kristján Kristjánsson (himself a writer) and Margrét Ţorvaldsdóttir. At first, the company was primarily a vehicle for the publication of the journal Árbók Akurnesinga. The company was given a boost when, in 2006-7, Ævar Örn Jósepsson chose to publish there, expanding its output to around 20 titles per year at that time. In 2009, the company set up an online book-club called Undirheima ('Underworld') to promote its translated and domestic crime fiction portfolio, which included the authors Ævar Örn Jósepsson, Liza Marklund, Jo Nesbø, Camilla Läckberg and Sara Blædel.

The company got into financial difficulties in 2013 and ceased trading in 2014, with 15 of its authors left unpaid for a substantial period. Its bank, Landsbanki, entered the company into bankruptcy proceedings in November 2015.

== Authors ==
Authors published by Uppheimar included:

- Ari Trausti Guðmundsson
- Bjarki Karlsson
- Bjarni Bjarnason
- Böðvar Guðmundsson
- Gyrðir Elíasson
- Ísak Harðarson
- Kristín Ómarsdóttir
- Ragnar Th. Sigurðsson
- Sigfús Bjartmarsson
- Sigmundur Ernir Rúnarsson
- Sigrún Davíðsdóttir
- Vilborg Arna Gissurardóttir
