= Borealism =

Form of exoticism imposed on the North

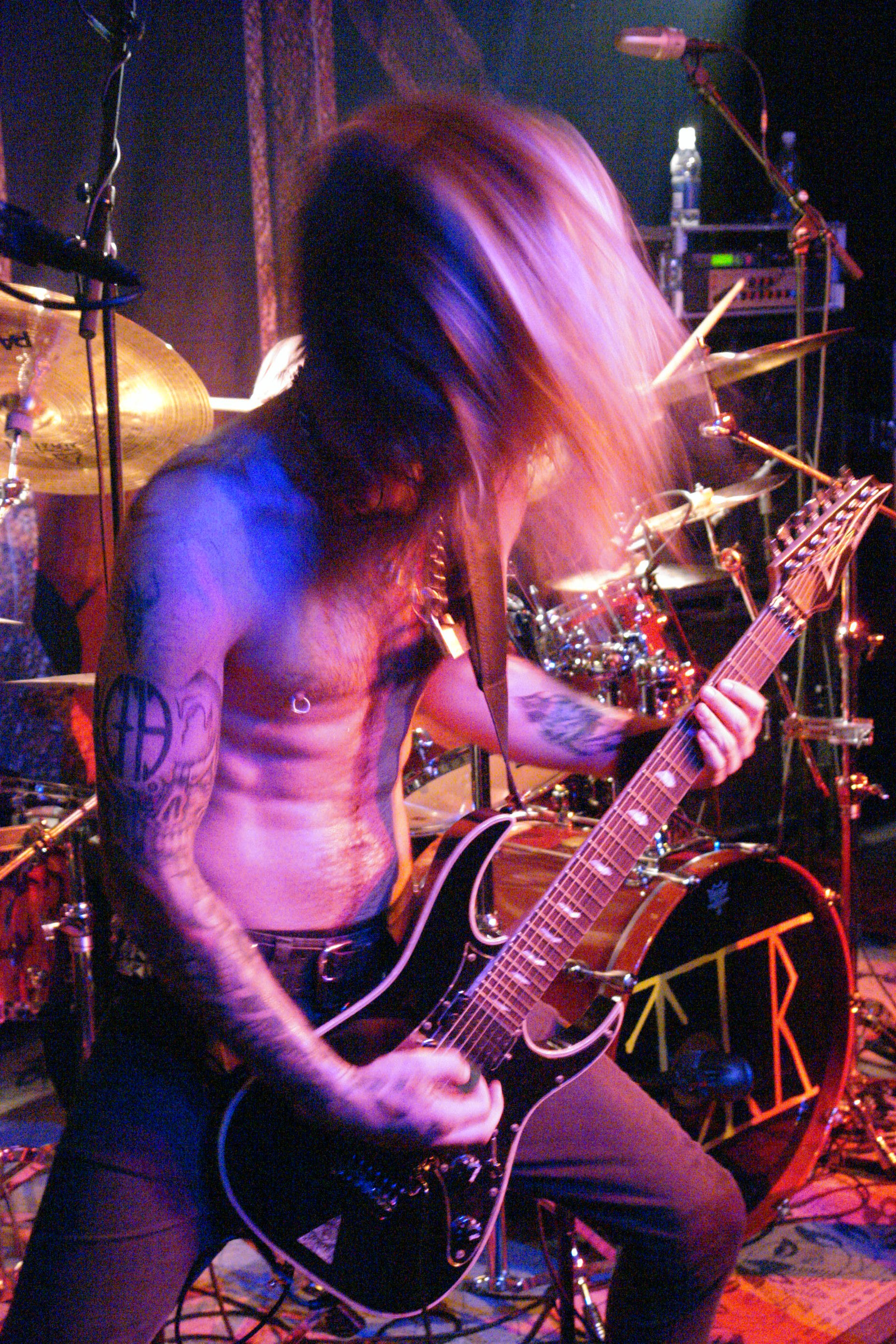
The Faroese folk metal band Týr performing in Copenhagen in 2007. Their development of a Viking-Faroese brand has been interpreted as self-exoticisation that capitalises on international enthusiasm for borealism.

Borealism is a form of exoticism in which stereotypes are imposed on the Earth's northern regions and cultures (particularly the Nordic and Arctic regions).

The term was inspired by the similar concept of Orientalism, first coined by Edward Said. An early form of Borealism can be identified in antiquity, especially Roman writings; but, like Orientalism, Borealism came to flourish in eighteenth-century European Romanticism and Romantics' fantasies about distant regions. Borealism can include the paradoxical ideas that the North is uniquely savage, inhospitable, or barbaric, and that it is uniquely sublime, pure, or enlightened.

A further form of borealism is the explicit invocation of the boreal by white-supremacist far-right politicians.

== Etymology ==
The term borealism derives from the adjective boreal, which originates from the name of the deity of the north wind Boreas (Βορέας) in Greek mythology. The term denotes what is or comes from in the Northern Hemisphere. It opposes austral, denoting what lies in or comes from the Southern Hemisphere, and is also connected to the terms oriental (denoting what lies in the east) and occidental (denoting what lies in the west).

Boreal is not synonymous with northern, the latter qualifying what is north; the first indicates an absolute position, while the second indicates a relative position.

== Borealism in art and culture ==
Examples of borealism include Icelandic financiers being imagined as 'raiding Vikings' during the banking boom that culminated in the 2008–2011 Icelandic financial crisis; the traditional music of Scandinavia being seen as distinctively sublime; the stereotyping of Sámi people as strange and magical savages; differences between Canadians and Americans being accounted for by Canadians' proximity to arctic wilderness; and commentators imagining that the music of the Icelandic band Sigur Rós is the product of Iceland's distinctive geology of glaciers and volcanoes.

Borealism was a prominent phenomenon in the reception of Nordic literature in Central and Eastern Europe at the end of the 19th century and in the beginning of the 20th century. The so-called modern breakthrough movement, Scandinavian symbolism, impressionism, naturalism, decadence and new-romanticism reached most of the European countries (just as it was the case with Slavic literatures), which had a huge impact on the region's theatre, prose fiction and lyric. It was also the period, when the first professional translators (Hugo Kosterka, Henrik Hajdu, Margit G. Beke) from Swedish, Norwegian and Danish appeared on the literary scene. The translations, reviews and articles were marked by a mythical reading of the cultures of Northern Europe. Literary borealism can be best understood as an unwritten set of rhetoric and poetic rules. Through this filter the peoples, territories and literatures of the Nordic countries are anthropologically, geographically and culturally distinctive from other nations. But most often it was the natural phenomena (ice, snow, mountains, seas, lakes, fjords, flora and fauna, volcanos etc.) that had a major effect on the individuals, according to the early 20th century borealists.

== Borealism in far-right politics ==
Although the concept of "hyperboreal" in relation to the origins of European civilization was already used by esoteric and metaphysical writers such as Helena Blavatsky and René Guénon, the term "boreal" was adopted into far-right political language by the Italian reactionary and traditionalist Julius Evola, who is influential in extreme right-wing circles. In his book Rivolta contro il mondo moderno (Revolt against the Modern World; 1934) Evola writes that in the "Golden Age" the center of the "Olympic civilization" that spread across the Eurasian continent was in a "Boreal" or Nordic "region". The Thule-Gesellschaft, a secret society of which the Nazi Heinrich Himmler was a member, believed that the Aryan race came from the mythical northern province of Hyperborea.

In twenty-first-century politics, the term boreal is used by politicians like Jean-Marie Le Pen in France and Thierry Baudet in The Netherlands to refer to Northern Europe and its ethnic groups, culture and languages. The term is used as a euphemism for white people, and is framed as being opposite migrating minorities, in an attempt to avoid openly racist connotations. Le Pen's statements about a "boreal Europe" and "white world" contributed to him being expelled by Marine Le Pen in 2015 as a member of the Front National.

The term has also been used by Russian-nationalist movements since the 1990s after the fall of the Berlin wall as an indication of ethnic Russians.

In the Netherlands, Forum for Democracy (FvD) leader Thierry Baudet introduced the word in a political context. At the first party congress of the FvD in 2017, he spoke about "our boreal Europe"; in the victory speech he gave to his followers after the 2019 Dutch provincial elections, about "our boreal world". Following criticism of his speech, he stated in an interview that he was referring to "a beautiful, poetic designation" of Europe, the western world or western civilization. According to Baudet, the boreal is also the part of the world that is illuminated by the aurora borealis or the northern lights. These are mainly Western countries in Europe and North America.

== See also ==
- Aryan
- Caucasoid
- Dog-whistle politics
- Ethnic groups in Europe
- Genetic history of Europe
- Orientalism
- Nordicism
- Sociology of race and ethnic relations
- White supremacy
