= Ágústa Guðmundsdóttir =

Icelandic academic

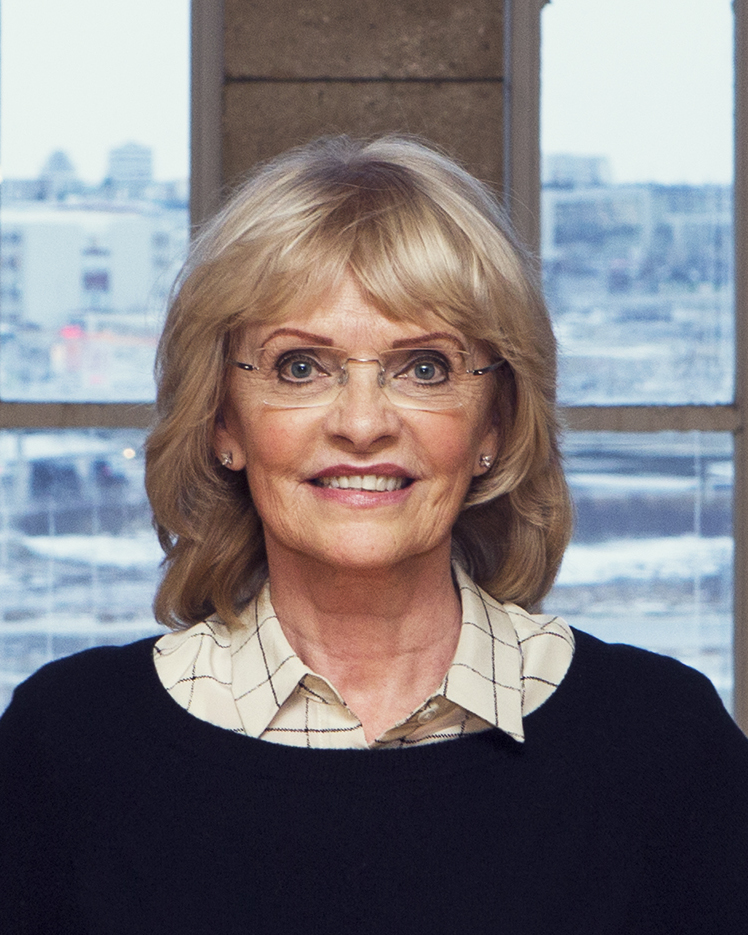
- Born: 1945 (age 80–81)
- Occupations: Professor emerita; businesswoman

Ágústa Guðmundsdóttir (born 1945) is a professor emerita in the School of Health Sciences at the University of Iceland, and was a co-founder of the biotechnology company Zymetech, where she also works in research and development.

== Professional career ==
Guðmundsdóttir completed BS studies in food science at the University of Iceland in 1980 and thereby became one of the first food scientists to graduate from the university. She also completed BS studies in Biochemistry from the University of Iceland in 1984, and in 1988, she graduated with a PhD in Microbiology and Molecular Biology from the University of Virginia, School of Medicine with emphasis on genetic analysis and protein chemistry.

Guðmundsdóttir has worked on research and teaching for many years. From 1980 to 1984, she worked on research at the Science Institute of the University of Iceland, and since 1989, she has been a visiting professor at the University of Virginia, School of Medicine. She served as associate professor in Food Chemistry during the period 1989–1993, and in 1993, she was appointed the first Professor of Food Chemistry at the University of Iceland. With the appointment, she became the first woman to be appointed Professor in the Faculty of Physical Sciences at the University of Iceland Ágústa has also conducted research at the University of California, San Francisco and New York University.

== Research ==
Guðmundsdóttir's research is focused on the use of cod enzymes to fight microbial infections, as well as on the development of medical products. In her Ph.D. dissertation, "Genetic Analysis of BtuB: A Vitamin B12 Binding and Transport Protein in the Escherichia coli Outer Membrane", she carried out a genetic analysis of BtuB. Ágústa has also written a number of scientific articles and book chapters.

== Zymetech ==
Guðmundsdóttir is one of the two founders of the biotechnology company Zymetech. The company, which was founded in 1999, is based on the research of Ágústa and the late Jón Bragi Bjarnason, Professor of Biochemistry. Zymetech makes use of trypsins from North-Atlantic Cod, which through the years has for the most part been discarded, and in this way, the company has developed a product that multiplies the value of the cod. Zymetech manufactures PreCold to fight the common cold, as well as various skin and cosmetics products (e.g. the derma health product Penzim). The company works on the development of products for bacterial infections, skin disorders, and wound healing.

In 2015, Zymetech won the Icelandic Innovation Award, which was granted to companies considered to have achieved outstanding results in the development of a new product or service based and which have attained commercial success in the market. On "Food Day", held on 20 October 2016, the Iceland Nutrition Society awarded Ágústa an honorary recognition for work benefitting food and nutrition research in Iceland. This was the first time such a recognition was awarded. On 2 November 2017, the symposium Rannsóknir og verðmætasköpun, was held to honour Ágústa.

== Other activities ==
Guðmundsdóttir was Chair of the Public Relations Committee at the University of Iceland during the period 1990–1993, and was a member of the board of the New Venture Capital Fund of Iceland (NSA) during 2003–2009, and a member of the board of Matís ohf (The Food Research Institute), during 2006–2016. Ágústa was the first woman to be appointed chair of the board of the National and University Library of Iceland during the years 2014–2018. She has served as chair of the board of SIL (association of Icelandic biotechnology companies) from 2012, and from 2016, worked as a scientific advisor to the biotechnology company, Enzymatica AB.

Guðmundsdóttir was President of the Rotary Club of Reykjavik during 2015–2016. In 2019, Ágústa was one of ten entrepreneurs and investors to be recruited by the Minister of Industries and Innovation to participate in a think tank (is. hugveita), to discuss the matters of innovation and entrepreneurship.

== Articles ==
- Biochemical characterization of a native group III trypsin ZT from Atlantic cod (Gadus morhua) (2019)
- Elucidation of different cold-adapted Atlantic cod (Gadus morhua) trypsin X isoenzymes (2017)
- Potential use of Atlantic cod trypsin in Biomedicine (2013).

== Book chapters ==
- Gudmundsdóttir, Á., Stefánsson, B. and Bjarnason, J. B. (2013). Trypsin I in Fish. In Neil D. Rawlings and Guy S. Salvesen, Handbook of Proteolytic Enzymes, 3rd ed. (pp. 2621–2624). Oxford: Academic Press. Release date December 3. 2012.
- Sveinsdóttir, H., Gudmundsdóttir, Á. and Vilhelmsson, O. (2009). Proteomics. In S. Nollet and P. Toldrá, Handbook of Seafood and Seafood Products Analysis (pp. 21–42). CRC Press.
- Gudmundsdóttir, Á. and Bjarnason, J. B. (2007). Enzyme purification and determination of structure. In Bob Rastall, Novel enzyme technology for food applications (pp. 205–214). Woodhead Publishing Limited, Cambridge, UK
