= Elvenking =

Elvenking may refer to:

- Thranduil, a character in J. R. R. Tolkien's legendarium, first introduced in The Hobbit as the Elvenking
- Elvenking (band), an Italian folk/power metal band
- Erlking, a german/danish folklore fairy
- Erlkönig, a poem by Goethe
