= Elveskud =

Scandinavian ballad

"Elveskud" or "Elverskud" (pronounced [ˈelvɐskuð]; Danish for "Elf-shot") is the Danish, and most widely used, name for one of the most popular ballads in Scandinavia.

== Origins and distribution ==
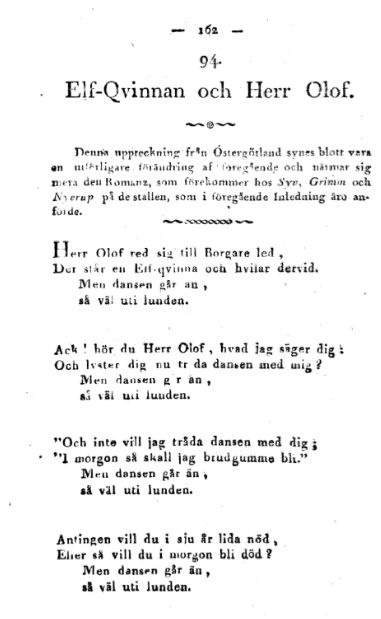
A sheet from the Swedish songbook (1816)

The origins of the ballad are agreed to be considerably earlier than the earliest manuscripts, in the Middle Ages, but there is little consensus beyond this. Many scholars suggest a Breton or French origin but the routes by which it came to and was disseminated within Northern Europe are unknown.

The ballad has close parallels across Europe (the closest English-language parallel being "Clerk Colvill"). The earliest surviving manuscript is Karen Brahes Folio, a Danish manuscript from the 1570s; the earliest surviving Swedish version is from the 1670s. At least seventy Scandinavian variants are known; over forty come from Denmark, and seventeen from Sweden.

It is also widely known as:

- "Herr Olof och Älvorna" ("Sir Olof and the Elves", Swedish).
- "Elf-Qvinnan och Herr Olof" ("The Elf-Woman and Sir Olof", Swedish).
- "Kvæði af Ólafi liljurós" ("Song of Ólafur lily-rose", Icelandic).
- "Olaf liljekrans" ("Olaf lily-wreath", Norwegian).
- "Ólavur riddarrós og álvarmoy" ("Ólavur knight-rose and the elf-maiden", Faroese).

== Summary ==
In the summary of The Types of the Scandinavian Medieval Ballad,

Olav rides out at dawn and comes upon elves dancing in the woods. One of the elf maids invites him to dance with her, but he refuses and tells her that he is to be married the next day. She puts a fatal sickness on him. When he comes home he is dying. He expresses his last wishes.

Not all versions precisely fit this summary. For example, in many Danish versions, Olav does dance with the elves, sometimes to death; in some versions in Denmark, Norway and Sweden Olav's death is at first concealed from his bride, but eventually she finds out; in the Icelandic versions, the bride is not mentioned at all, and Olav's refusal to dance arises from his Christian faith. In one Faroese variant, Olav is implied to have been romantically involved with the elf-woman for some time; it also begins with his mother predicting his death.

Vésteinn Ólason's summary of the Icelandic variants of the ballad, generally known as "Kvæði af Ólafi liljurós", is

Ólafur rides along a rocky hillside, meets four elf-maidens who welcome him and invite him to drink (or live) with them. He refuses to live with the elves and would rather believe in God (Christ). One of the elf-maidens asks him to wait, and goes to fetch a sword which she hides under her clothing as she asks him for a kiss. When Ólafur bends down to kiss her, she thrusts the sword under his shoulderblade to his heart. Ólafur spurs his horse and rides home to his mother; she asks why he is so pale; (he hedges at first); tells the truth; asks his mother to make his bed and his sister to dress the wounds. Thereupon he dies (and is buried along with his mother and sister(?)).

== Text ==
The most widely known version of "Elveskud" is that published by Peder Syv in 1695, given here in modernised spelling:

Original

Mangen rider rank og rød,
er dog morgen krank og død.

1. Hr. Olof han rider så vide
alt til sit bryllup at byde.
Men dansen den går så let gennem lunden.

2. Der danse fire, og der danse fem,
ellekongens datter rækker hånden frem.

3. "Velkommen, hr. Oluf, lad fare din fig,
bi lidet og træd her i dansen med mig.«

4. Jeg ikke tør, jeg ikke må:
imorgen skal mit bryllup stå.«

5. Hør du, hr. Oluf, træd dansen med mig:
to bukkeskinds støvler så giver jeg dig.

6. To bukkeskinds støvler, sidder vel om ben,
forgyldene spore derom spændt.

7. Hør du, hr. Ole, træd dansen med mig:
en silkeskjorte giver jeg dig.

8. En silkeskjorte så hvid og fin,
den blegte min moder ved måneskin.«

9. Jeg ikke tør, jeg ikke må:
i morgen skal mit bryllup stå.«

10. Hør du, hr. Oluf, træd dansen med mig:
et hoved af guld så giver jeg dig.«

11. "Et hoved af guld kan jeg vel få,
men danse med dig tør jeg ej så.«

12. »Og vil du ikke danse med mig,
sot og sygdom skal følge dig.«

13. Hun slog hannem mellem sine hærde,
aldrig var han slagen værre

14. Hun Iøfted hr. Oluf på ganger rød:
»Og rid nu hjem til din fæstemØ.«

15. Der han kom til borgeled,
der står hans moder og hviler ved

16. "Hør du, hr. Oluf, kær sønnen min
hvi bær' du nu så bleg en kind?«

17. Og jeg må vel bære kinden bleg,
for jeg har været i ellekonenes leg

18. Hør du, hr. Ole, min sØn så prud:
hvad skal jeg svare din unge brud?«

19. I skal sige, jeg er udi lunde,
at prøve min hest og så mine hunde.«

20. Årle om morgen, dag det var,
da kom den brud med brudeskar'.

21. De skænkte mjød, og de skænkte vin:
»Hvor er hr. Ole, brudgom min?«

22. Hr. Oluf han red sig hen i lunde,
han prøved sin hest og så sine hunde.«

23. Hun tog op det skarlagen rød:
der lå hr. Oluf og var død.

24. Årle om morgen, dag det var,
der komme tre lig af hr. Oles gård.

25. Hr. Oluf og hans fæstemø,
hans moder blev og af sorgen død.
Men dansen den går så let gennem lunden.

Translation

Many ride tall and red
but in the morning sick and dead.

1. Sir Olof he rides so far
to his wedding to offer his hand,
and the dance goes so lightly through the grove.

2. There dance four, and there dance five,
elfking's daughter reaches out her hand.

3. "Welcome, Sir Oluf, let thy burdens go,
stay a little, and dance with me."

4. "I don't dare, I may not:
tomorrow I will be wed."

5. "Listen, Sir Oluf, dance with me,
two buckskin boots I will give to thee."

6. Two buckskin boots, fitting well around the legs,
gilded spurs buckled on."

7. Listen, Sir Oluf, dance with me,
a silken shirt I will give to thee."

8. A silken shirt so white and fine,
my mother bleached it in the moonshine."

9. "I don't dare, I don't have to:
tomorrow I will be wed."

10. "Listen, Sir Oluf, dance with me,
a lump [lit. "a head"] of gold I will give to thee."

11. "A lump of gold I can receive,
but dance with thee I dare not."

12. "And if thou wilt not dance with me,
plague and disease will follow thee."

13. She struck him between his shoulders,
never had he been hit harder.

14. She lifted Sir Oluf onto the horse red,
"Ride back to thy betrothed maiden."

15. Then he came to his castle gate,
that his mother is resting beside.

16. "Listen, Sir Oluf, my son,
why are thy cheeks so pale?

17. "My cheeks are pale,
because I've been in the elf-wives' gate."

18. "Listen, Sir Ole, my son so proud,
what should I tell thy young bride?"

19. "I will say I'm outside in the grove,
to ride my horse, and try my dogs."

20. Then in the morning, day it was,
came the bride in her bride-gown.

21. "They gave me mead, they gave me wine,
where is Sir Ole, my groom?"

22. "Sir Oluf rode into the grove,
he's trying his horse, and his dogs."

23. She took up the scarlet red,
there lay Oluf, and he was dead.

24. Early in morning, day it was,
there comes three corpses off Sir Ole's farm.

25. Sir Oluf and his bride to be,
his mother died from sorrow.
but the dance goes lightly through the grove.

== Translations ==
These and other available translations by Borrow, Prior, etc., are listed in Syndergaard's survey:

- "Elfin Shaft", Smith-Dampier, E. M. (1920). Danish Ballads. University press. pp. 116–119.
- "Sir Oluf and the Elf-king's daughter", Jamieson, Robert (1806). Popular ballads and songs (snippet). Edinburgh: Archibald Constable & Co. p. 223.
- "Sir Olof in Elve-Dance" and "The Elf-Woman and Sir Olof" (two versions), Keightley, Thomas (1850) [1828]. The Fairy Mythology. Vol. 1. H. G. Bohn. pp. 82–86.)
- "Sir Olof and the Elves", Cumpstey, Ian (2013). Lord Peter and Little Kerstin. Skadi Press.

== References in culture ==
The ballad has inspired a very large number of reworkings.

Most famously, a translation of a Danish variant (DFG 47B, from Peter Syv's 1695 edition) into German by Johann Gottfried Herder as "Erlkönigs Tochter" inspired Johann Wolfgang von Goethe's poem "Erlkönig", which developed the concept of the Erlking.

The ballad was one of the inspirations for the 1828 play Elves' Hill by Johan Ludvig Heiberg.

Other works inspired by "Elveskud" include Henrik Ibsen's 1856 play Olaf Liljekrans; Kristín Marja Baldursdóttir's 1995 novel Mávahlátur; Böðvar Guðmundsson's 2012 novel Töfrahöllin; and Steeleye Span's folk-rock song "Dance with Me".
