= Land tækifæranna =

Crime fiction novel

Land tækifæranna (transl. Land of opportunities) is a 2008 crime fiction novel by Ævar Örn Jósepsson. The backdrop for the events was the 2008 Icelandic financial crisis, with Ævar Örn rewriting parts of the novel just before publication to respond to the unfolding political situation in Iceland. It won the Blóðdropinn award and was thus nominated for the Glass Key Award. Published in Reykjavik by Uppheimar, 2008, ISBN 9979659165. It is the author's fifth crime novel with the same characters, and received positive reviews. In the assessment of Katrín Jakobsdóttir;

The community divide suits Ævar well and he is on great form in this book, creating a nice plot around the murdered Pole and the financier (útrásarvíkingur), and clearly enjoys putting words into the mouths of his characters when he constructs dialogues about the situation. Land of Opportunities thus testifies well to what good effects he has achieved in the form, and at the same time he has distinguished himself with a sharp social commentary and well established subject matter.

== See also ==
- Icelandic literature
