= Handrit.is =

Icelandic digital library

Handrit.is (e. manuscript.is) is a digital library run by the National and University Library of Iceland which hosts digital editions of historical Icelandic and Danish manuscripts "dating back hundreds of years" from the Icelandic Árni Magnússon Institute for Icelandic Studies and the Danish Den Arnamagnæanske Samling
