= Land of Freedom =

Land of Freedom may refer to:

- Azadistan, meaning "Land of Freedom", state in the Iranian province of Azarbaijan for several months in 1920
- Boyacá Department, Colombia, nicknamed "Land of Freedom" as the site of a major battle in Colombia's struggle for independence from Spain
- Zale'n-gam, meaning "Land of Freedom", proposed state for the Kuki people in eastern Bangladesh, northeastern India, and western Myanmar

== Music ==
- "I Ain't Got Time to Tarry", 1858 song by American blackface minstrel composer Dan Emmett, also known as "The Land of Freedom"
- Snowy White (album), 1984 album by English guitarist Snowy White, released as Land of Freedom in some markets
- "Land of Freedom", 1994 song by British rock band Atomic Rooster on their album Headline News

== See also ==
- Land of Liberty, 1939 American documentary film
- Freedomland (disambiguation)
- List of freedom indices, for rankings of countries on various freedoms
