= Töfrahöllin =

2012 novel by Böðvar Guðmundsson

First edition

Töfrahöllin ('hall of enchantments') is the fifth novel by Böðvar Guðmundsson, published in 2012 by Uppheimar.

== Summary ==
The protagonist of Töfrahöllin is Jósep Malmholm, born in the 1960s into a wealthy and highly educated family. Jósep's father is a member of Iceland's urbane upper classes and his mother a bright, upwardly mobile, but ultimately frustrated woman of working class fishing stock from the Vestmannaeyjar. The summers which the young Jósep spends in the countryside at the farm of Litla-Háfi with older male working-class relatives on his mother's side provides a reference point of happiness and wellbeing through his often dystopian later life. These relatives are his maternal grandfather, a committed communist, and another male relative of roughly Jósep's mother's generation, the farmer Símon, who is milder than Jósep's grandfather and a yet more reliable touchstone for prudent, traditional, rustic Icelandic values.

Jósep meets the nouveau-riche investor Kormákur Cooltran, partly because Kormákur establishes a magnificent fishing lodge on the same salmon-river as the one where Litla-Háfi lies. Kormákur Cooltran enjoys a winning charm which is, however, underlain by a steely resolve to get his own way, if necessary by psychological manipulation—framed in Kormákur's case by a selfishly patriarchal worldview and a large helping of homophobia. Kormákur becomes a father-figure to Jósep, whose own (gay) father has abandoned him. He employs Jósep at the fishing-lodge, which Jósep dubs Töfrahöllin (‘hall of enchantments’). Kormákur tries, to some extent successfully, to control both Jósep and his daughters by pairing them up: through a slightly convoluted series of events, Jósep finds himself in long-term relationships serially with Kormákur's three daughters (Valhrund Besta, Írena, and Álfheiður)

Kormákur uses Jósep for around thirty years as a minion in his various power-games and business activities, legal and illegal. Kormákur uses Jósep as his mule in cocaine smuggling, and when caught Jósep chooses to the take the full blame for the smuggling and serves a long prison sentence. Kormákur's influence over Jósep does not wane significantly until eventually, bankrupt and estranged from his children, Kormákur commits suicide.

At this point, Jósep is claimed by a forthright Turkish sex-worker, Fatma Özymal, who has been working at the fishing lodge and whom Jósep helps when she is assaulted by Kormákur Cooltran. The novel ends with Fatma popping back to Turkey to collect her daughter in order to bring her to Iceland, retire from sex-work, and, we are promised, to join Jósep in belated petit-bourgeois comfort.

== Assessments ==
The author claimed that the novel, which covers a thirty-five-year span, was thirty years in the making, and attempted to track the changing national character and self-image of Iceland. The reviewer Egill Ólafsson viewed the book as gripping, with colourful characters.

== Influences ==
Through its chapter titles and the fact that Kormákur's wife is a member of a sorority called the Liljurósriddarareglan ('the order of Liljurós'), named after the protagonist of Iceland's most famous traditional ballad, 'Kvæði af Ólafi liljurós', the novel construes Jósep as a parallel for Ólafur liljurós. Meanwhile, Kormákur himself is modelled on the 'sinister, manipulative' elvish king in Goethe's poem 'Der Erlkönig', which was inspired by the same ballad-tradition. The novel can be seen as a critical commentary on Icelandic culture during the banking boom that preceded the 2008 Icelandic financial crisis.

== Reviews ==
- 'Fyrst og fremst saga um persónur', Visir (28 November 2012).
- Egill Helgason, 'Limrur, Lýður læknir, Síðasta freisting Krists og stór skammtur af gagnrýni', Eyjan (19 December 2012).
- Egill Ólafsson, 'Það eru töfrar í Töfrahöllinni', Morgunblaðið (24 November 2012), 69.
