= Samhengi hlutanna =

Novel by Sigrún Davíðsdóttir

Samhengi hlutanna ('the context of things') is an Icelandic novel by Sigrún Davíðsdóttir. It is a thriller set in the aftermath of the 2008 Icelandic financial crisis, focusing on the efforts of the protagonist, Arnar Finnsson, to complete the last book and, eventually, solve the murder of his dead partner Hulda.

== Form ==
Samhengi hlutanna is a first-person crime thriller, written in the voice of Arnar Finnsson, an Icelander who has abandoned a career as a lawyer to move to London and become an artist and illustrator. A large proportion of the book is direct speech, as the main characters work their way from one informant to another, and process the information they receive in conversations between themselves. To a large extent their interviews form a series of set-piece case studies of different sections of Iceland's boom-time business community, each reflecting on the Crash from their own perspective. It has been suggested that Sigrún's writing is strongest when portraying Arnar's inner life and the colourful characters he encounters, but becomes rather stilted when dealing with financial detail.

Rather than being divided into chapters as such, the narrative is simply punctuated by headings stating the date whenever a new day begins (in the abbreviated format '2.4. (fö.)' (i.e. '2 April (föstudagur [Friday])'). Whenever the city where the action takes place shifts between London and Reykjavík, the setting is announced on an otherwise blank page. As Jón Karl Helgason has pointed out, much of the novel corresponds closely with real life: thus it features HK banki, Eyjabanki and Sleipnir, which seem straightforwardly to be ciphers for KB banki, Landsbanki and Glitnir, and the investment funds Hringur and Delilah, recalling Baugur Group and Samson holdings. The book invites interpretation, then, as a roman à clef. Indeed, commentators have noted that, as a female Icelandic journalist in London investigating the Crash, Hulda can be seen as a cipher for Sigrún herself.

In the analysis of Jón Karl Helgason, 'as a thriller, the narrative gets going rather slowly, but for those who have an interest in and a general acquaintance with developments in Icelandic business life in recent years, on the other hand, it is intriguing to note how closely the author sticks to reality in her writing'. Sigrún can be understood as working to make the financial complexities of the Icelandic Crash accessible to a wider audience unlikely to read the lengthy official report, while also using novellistic form to explore the possibility of financial crime that her investigative journalism led her to suspect but that could not be proven. Finally, the novel allows her to inhabit the voices and views of different people on the Crash. The same perspectives have been suggested by Sigrún's own commentary on writing the novel, though she has emphasised the fictionality of the work, and that evidence of money laundering in the Icelandic banks has not come to light, with the relevant suspicious behaviour being attributable to 'abysmally bad management'.

== Summary ==
On 14 December 2009, Arnar's partner Hulda, a journalist, is killed in what is at first thought to be a road accident, while writing an investigative book about shady dealings behind the 2008 Icelandic financial crisis. Arnar falls into depression. On 21 March 2010, however, an old friend of Hulda's, the reformed alcoholic Raggi, visits Arnar, insisting that together they complete Hulda's book. They swiftly follow Hulda's leads, abetted by tip-offs from a sinister Russian called Dmitri, to one Óttar Hafsteinsson. As the novel goes on, it emerges that Óttar was involved in establishing a factory in post-Soviet Saint Petersburg, before becoming an investor in the Bulgarian telecoms sector, backed by a German bank. Soon too, Arnar and Raggi team up with Mara, a beautiful Hong Kong-Finnish specialist in financial crime, with whom Raggi begins a relationship. Their explorations involve a number of British contacts and tagging along on the drug-fuelled binge of a Latvia-based Icelandic entrepreneur called Óli Örvar Magnússon. They have a long discussion with a lawyer called Wallinger, by which time Arnar is aware that he is being followed. Wallinger resigned from HK banki's operation in Luxembourg and fears to speak to the authorities due to a mixture of threats and fear of the opprobrium of other lawyers in the sector. 'Svo HK banki leit út eins og risastór peningaþvottavél?' ('so HK Bank looked like a giant money-launderer?') asks Raggi. 'Ekki bara HK banki ... Allt Ísland' ('not just HK Bank ... the whole of Iceland'), Wallinger replies (p. 141). Wallinger points the team towards a Luxembourg company called BRAK. Arnar returns home to find a dead pitbull terrier hung up in his flat, a clear sign that he is being threatened by someone. Mara later links this method of intimidation with Latvian criminal gangs. Arnar and Raggi proceed to talk with Árni Marínósson, a lawyer who worked for Óttar in the boom years, who defends Óttar's practices as the everyday life of a businessman. The heroes start to get a feel for the possibility that the Icelandic banks' activities extended beyond imprudent and immoral practice to bribery and money-laundering.

On 7 April, Arnar travels to Iceland to talk to his brother Rafn, a high-powered lawyer, and other acquaintances, to try to understand better what was going on during Iceland's boom. Rafn is a case-study of a patriotic Icelander who is bullish about Iceland's prospects. Arnar meets his ex-wife Þorbjörg at a birthday party; she and her husband worked for HK banki during the boom, and she is now unemployed while her husbands awaits impending prosecution. Arnar realises his brother is involved in helping the business associates Einar Þorsteinn, his father Jón, and one Vigfús, all closely tied to the Icelandic bank Sleipnir, to get €600,000 in cash out of Iceland. Arnar manages to install spyware on his brother's office computer. He receives a package from an anonymous informant containing lists of Luxembourg-connected companies with names featuring 'Brák' ('debris, oil slick'). Early in Arnar's trip, Árni Marínósson phones from Panama, promising to meet Arnar in Iceland with new information, but is reported lost at sea in Panama on 11 April. However, on 13 April, Árni's sister contacts Arnar to say she has received a package for him from Árni. It contains details regarding the network of Brák-companies, their legal ownership, and transactions. 'Brák er interessant af því að þeir sem stjörna Brák eru þeir sem í alvörunni ráða á Íslandi' ('Brák is interesting because the men who run Brák are the men who are really in charge in Iceland'), writes Árni (p. 297). While in Iceland, Arnar is followed by a man who turns out to be a Latvian criminal called (inter alia) Juris Kalnis, and receives a threatening letter and phone call, the latter of which implies that Hulda was murdered. Meanwhile, Dmitri and other sources suggest that some Russians lost badly in the Crash because HK banki was holding bonds on their behalf. Before returning home on 21 April, Arnar and Þorbjörg visit the 2010 eruptions of Eyjafjallajökull.

Back in London, the team conclude that Brák companies are buying at overvalued prices and/or selling at undervalued ones, and conclude that the network is a vehicle for illicit payments. Rafn comes to London on business and helps them establish that Vigfús, Eninar Þorsteinn, Jón, and Óli Örvar are all near the centre of Brák, and that Óli Örvar helped Óttar Hafsteinsson set up his business in Russia. Rafn's job in London is to deliver the €600,000 and he realises that it is going into the hands of Juris Kalnis (the Latvian criminal who has been following Arnar), Sævar Bjarni Halldórsson (an Icelander who is based in Latvia) and Peteris Ozolins. Rafn returns home and it dawns on the team that Hulda did not die accidentally but was murdered, with the €600,000 being payment for her assassination. The murder was probably prompted by her publication of an article about the Russian bonds in HK banki.

Arnar and Raggi return to the scene of Hulda's murder and find a sweatshop on the street, where one of the workers gives them information about the killing. Mara directs them to a private investigator, Xavier, who helps them assemble their evidence to convince Scotland Yard to reopen the case. One of Mara's police friends tips off the team that the murderers are coming to the UK to collect their payment and on 28 April they accost Sævar, Mara interrogates him, and they pass the evidence he provides to the police. On 29 April, the team learns that the police have arrested the killers, but on the same day Arnar learns that his brother Rafn has died in a car accident. Returning to Iceland, he receives a suicide note left by Rafn, which he burns. The final details of the relationship between the Latvian circle, Brák, and the Russian circle are left unresolved in the novel.
