= Mass media in Iceland =

The mass media in Iceland are well-developed for a country of its size. The Constitution of Iceland guarantees absolute freedom of speech. Therefore, Iceland’s media are among the freest in the world.

Iceland has been in the top ten of the Reporters Without Borders Press Freedom Index, since it was first compiled in 2002 until 2014. It was first or joint first in 2002-2008 and 2010. Its 2015 ranking is twenty one, reflecting a sharp deterioration in freedom of information since 2013, according to Reporters Without Borders.

== Television ==
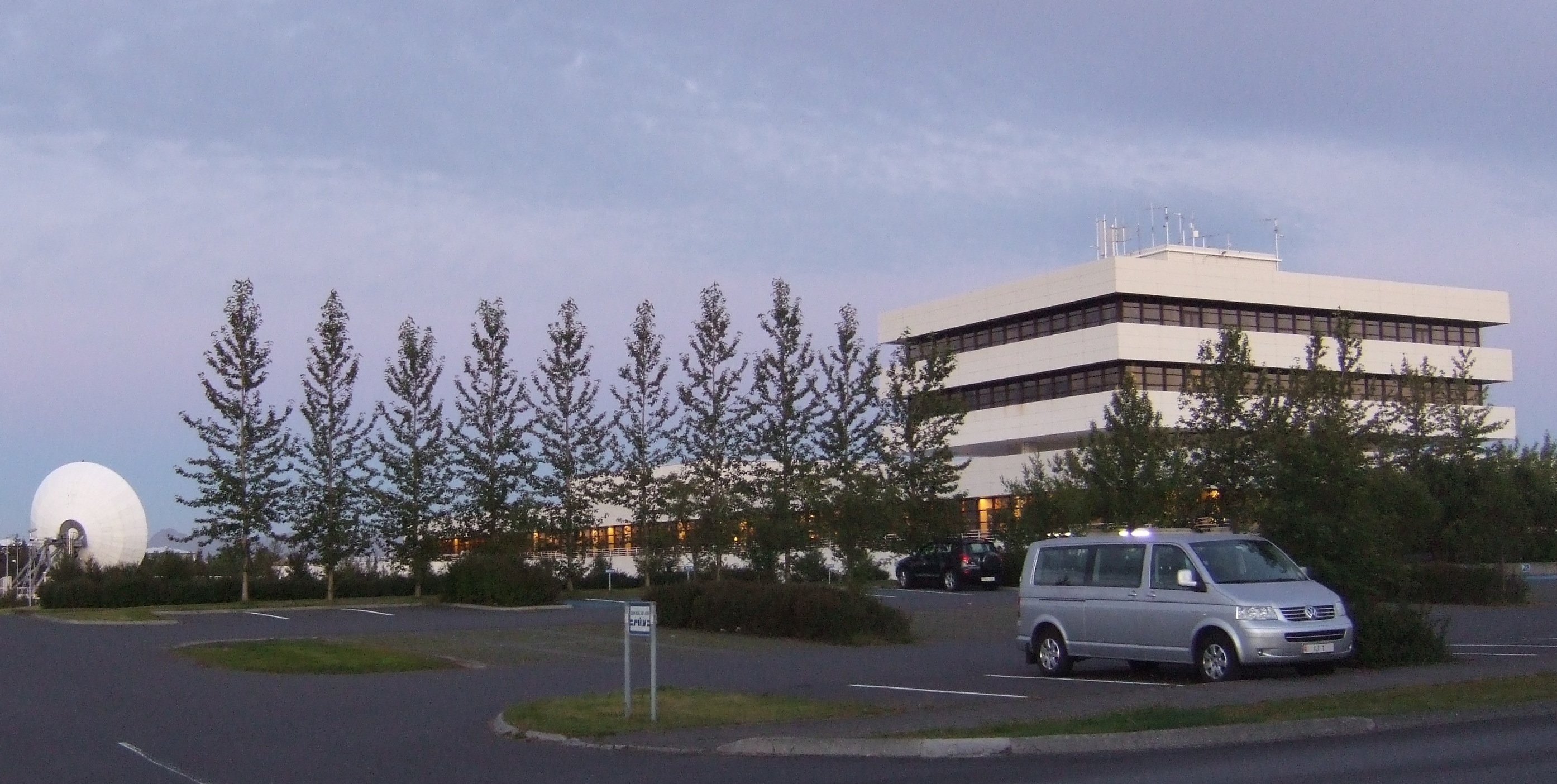
The RÚV headquarters in Reykjavík.

The principal television station in Iceland is RÚV, which is state-owned. It has a commitment to promote the Icelandic language and the country’s history, and is partly funded by license fee; the rest of the RÚV’s income comes from advertising. The channel broadcast by RÚV is Sjónvarpið, which translates as ‘the television’. Broadcasts started in 1966, and coverage very quickly reached every household in Iceland. RÚV had a monopoly on domestic broadcasting until 1986.

The main private television network is 365 corporation which runs numerous television stations including Stöð 2 (lit. ‘Channel 2’) which broadcasts mostly American programming but also original Icelandic programming and news programs. Other notable channels owned by 365 include Stöð 2 Sport, a sports channel, and various other sports channels and a movie channel which broadcasts mostly American movies. All of 365's channels are funded by subscription fees and advertising sales with one exception, Skífan TV, a music channel with music videos 24/7. The only subscription free principal channel is Skjár einn, which mainly broadcasts American programming and original Icelandic programming and is completely funded by advertising sales.

== Radio ==
Before television broadcasting started in 1966, RÚV had already been broadcasting radio since 1930. Rás 1 is the principal radio station, along with its sister channel Rás 2. Bylgjan is a notable private broadcaster. During World War Two, the BBC World Service operated Icelandic programming from the 1 December 1940 until 26 June 1944. From 1951 until 2006 US Armed Forces Radio broadcast from Keflavik military base. Iceland Review reported "It started operations in 1951 and had broadcast continuously for 55 years." And went on to say that "According to RÚV, the US Armed Forces Radio, colloquially known as “Yankee Radio”, made more American music available to Icelandic audiences and “deeply influenced the music, fashion and attitudes of Icelandic youth.”

== Press ==
Literature is a favourite pastime of the Icelanders, and so the printed press in the country is quite well developed.

=== Newspapers ===
Fréttablaðið is the principal daily newspaper in Iceland, and has the largest circulation of any newspaper in the country. It is distributed by 365 hf. to homes, free of charge. Morgunblaðið is a much older newspaper, founded in 1913, and is Fréttablaðið’s main competitor. Its readership is second largest after Fréttablaðið. These are the two main publications in terms of the quality press.

The tabloids include DV, a small yet controversial paper, which is published four times a week.

Viðskiptablaðið, Icelandic Financial News (lit. ‘the commercial newspaper’), is the country's principal business-oriented newspaper.

=== Magazines ===
Iceland Review is an English language magazine about Iceland, published quarterly.

The Reykjavík Grapevine is a free alternative magazine published and based in Reykjavík, Iceland, since June 2003. The magazine prints practical information on traveling and leisure for travelers, along with articles on music, arts, politics, nightlife and Icelandic culture in general.

== Internet ==
The internet is unrestricted by the government, and is used by around 97% of the population. Government has put in place rules that force telecommunication companies to block popular file sharing sites like The Pirate Bay and KickassTorrents.

== See also ==
- Telecommunications in Iceland

== Lists ==
- List of Icelandic newspapers
- List of Icelandic magazines
- List of Icelandic television channels
- List of Icelandic radio stations
