= Mannorð =

2011 novel by Bjarni Bjarnason

Mannorð. Skäldsaga
- Author: Bjarni Bjarnason
- Language: Iceland
- Genre: Fiction
- Published: 2011
- Publisher: Uppheimar
- Publication place: Iceland
- Media type: Print (Paperback)
- ISBN: 9789935432261

Mannorð ('Reputation' or, in the author's translation, 'Repute' or 'Ill repute') is a novel by Bjarni Bjarnason, published by Uppheimar in 2011. The novel was published in English translation in 2017 as The Reputation.

The novel is in significant respects a response to the 2008 Icelandic financial crisis. The main character of the novel is in significant ways modelled on the real-life Icelandic financier Björgólfur Thor Björgólfsson, and its plot on Víkars þáttr, the second section of the longer version of the medieval Icelandic Gautreks saga.

== Summary ==
The protagonist of the novel is Starkaður Leví, a leading financier disgraced by the 2008–11 Icelandic financial crisis, partly inspired by the real-life Björgólfur Thor Björgólfsson, Iceland's first billionaire. The novel opens with Starkaður Leví in self-imposed exile in Kochi. Desiring to recover his lost reputation, he writes a half-heartedly apologetic letter to a newspaper and returns home; but is under official investigation and meets derision at best and violence at worst from society at large, and only dares to go out of his house in disguise. Seeing an author holding forth in the cafe Súfistinn about his part in the Kitchenware Revolution, Starkaður Leví envies his popularity and starts stealing volumes of his diary and reading them. The author turns out to be Almar Logi Almarsson and recently to have abruptly left his wife Hildur and son Bjartur, living in New York, to return to Iceland; he is world-weary and has writer's block.

Starkaður investigates whether he can buy himself a new reputation via the internet, and shortly afterwards a woman called Rita arrives at his door claiming to be a couch-surfer. It later emerges that she works for 'Litla firmað' ('the Little Company'), whIch indeed specialises in finding new identities for the super-rich. She takes Starkaður to an opulent estate far from Iceland, later known as Ginnungagap, where he meets the company's director, a psychoanalyst called Salómon Epstein (or just the Doctor) and his assistant (and, it later emerges, son) Clark.

Rita proceeds to contact Almar Logi offering to publish his book Demón Café in English, and investigates his life by talking to Hildur (who turns out to be part of the team developing the prosecution case against Starkaður). Rita organises a reading by Almar in Greenwich Village, and by asking questions about Almar's story begins to broach the prospect of Almar disappearing from society. She gets Almar drunk, and she and Clark abduct him to Ginnungagap. There, observed through CCTV by Starkaður, Rita and Dr Epstein convince Almar to allow Starkaður to take his identity and for Almar himself to be killed. Starkaður studies Almar's history and mannerisms, primarily through his diaries, and undergoes a long series of surgical operations in a warehouse in Grindavík to align his appearance with Almar Logi's.

At the point of no return in his transition, Starkaður reminisces about his failed relationship with a woman called Ása, and visits his grandmother, where he reminisces about his exile in India.

Towards the end of the transition, Starkaður moves in with Almar in Almar's house in the middle of Reykjavík; Almar, under the guidance of the Litla firmað, begins to repair his relationship with Hildur. Eventually, Almar invites Hildur to dinner; he and Starkaður swap places with each other during the course of the evening, and Starkaður has sex with Hildur without her realising the switch. Dr Epstein emphasises, however, that Starkaður will have a long way to go before the relationship is genuinely repaired.

Starkaður and Almar spend the night before Almar's death talking together; Almar assures Starkaður he need have no qualms; and Starkaður holds Almar's hand and strokes his hair while a lethal injection is delivered.

After the departure of Dr Epstein and Clark, Rita stays behind, emphasising that it is effectively Starkaður, not Almar, who is dead. Revealing that she has been having sex with Almar, she does so with his new incarnation.

The novel closes with Starkaður going out with Almar's friends and making the most of a chance meeting with Ása, before moving to New York, rebuilding his family relationships, burning the diaries recounting Almar's transition, and settling down to finish one of Almar's unfinished works.

== Critical reception ==
The novel got a positive reception among critics. Arnar Eggert Thoroddsen from SunnudagsMogginn noted that the "incredible scenario… dances at the boundaries of science fiction and James Bond's film". Alaric Hall, reviewing the novel, says that it is "particularly interesting… for the way it uses medieval intertexts to handle another common aspect of post-Crash writing: almost all literary post-Crash novels also take pains to situate Iceland in relation to the developing world, often specifically the Islamic world". He saw the work as unusual among Icelandic financial-crisis novels for exploring "how, once Iceland joined the global financial machine, and contrary to its habitual self-image as a newly independent, plucky post-colonial underdog, it took on a significant new role in a neo-colonial financial system".
