= Timarit.is =

Icelandic open access digital library

- Country of origin: Iceland
- Owner: National and University Library of Iceland
- Services: Open access digital library
- Website: timarit.is
- Commercial: No
- Launched: 2002
- Current status: Active

Timarit.is (also known as Tímarit.is, Tidarrit.fo and Aviisitoqqat.gl) is an open access digital library run by the National and University Library of Iceland which hosts digital editions of newspapers and magazines published in Iceland, Faroe Islands and Greenland as well as publications in their languages elsewhere, such as Canada which had a large influx of Icelanders in the late 19th and early 20th centuries. The project was initially sponsored by the West Nordic Council and launched its web interface under the title VESTNORD in 2002. The web interface has since undergone two major revisions, in 2003 and 2008. With the last revision a decision was made to gradually convert images from the DjVu image format to the more common PDF. Hence, part of the collection can be viewed with the DjVu plugin and part with a PDF reader.

The digital collection covers material from the 17th century to the early 21st century and offers users the ability to collect bookmarks on their free account for ease of use as well as do a text search on the majority of the collection. As of February 2009 there were more than 2.6 million images in the archive of which 2 million had been OCRed.

Initially the aim was to limit access to newspapers published before 1930 to avoid questions of copyright but shortly afterwards the project made an agreement with Morgunblaðið to scan and publish issues which are three years old. This agreement was followed with others involving both current and defunct newspapers published in the 20th century. Newspapers published after 2000 are usually sent to the library in digital format. The general rule, depending on agreements with each publisher, is to make these available 2–3 years after their initial publication.
