= Erlking =

Elf king in folklore

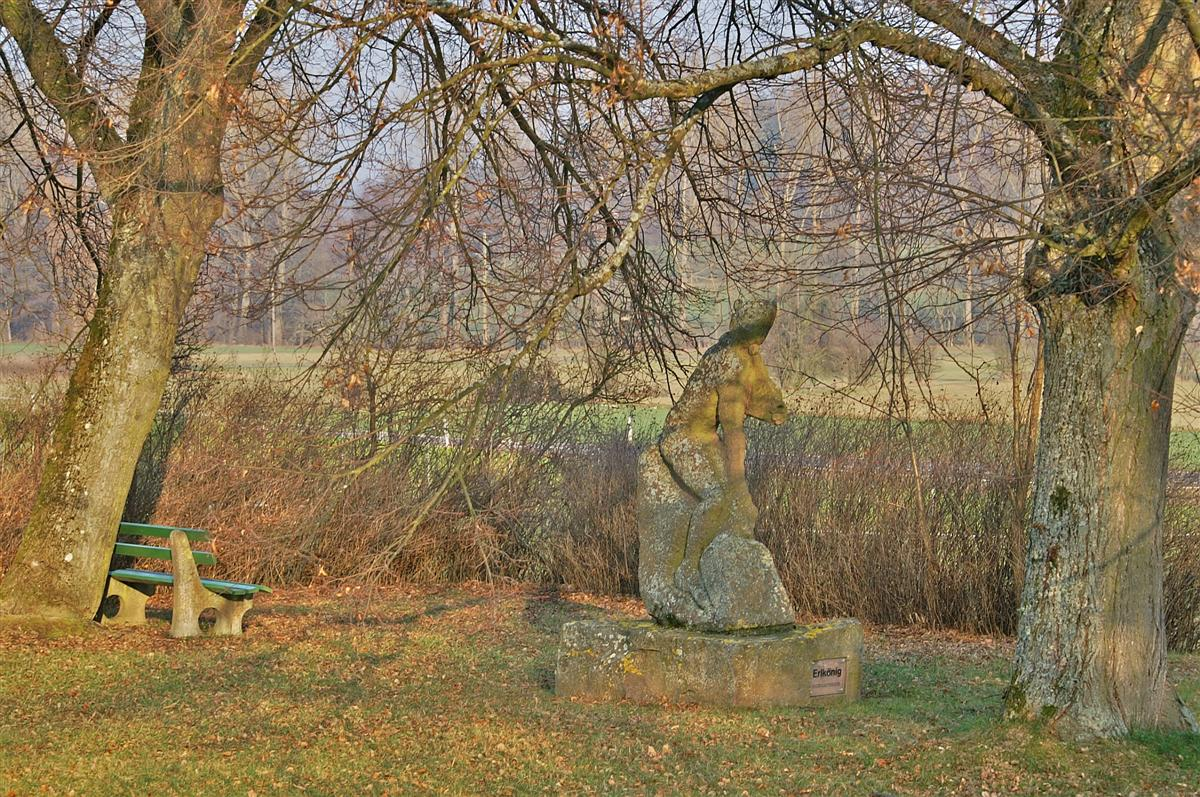
Statue depicting the Erlking in the ancient graveyard of Dietenhausen, in Keltern, Germany.

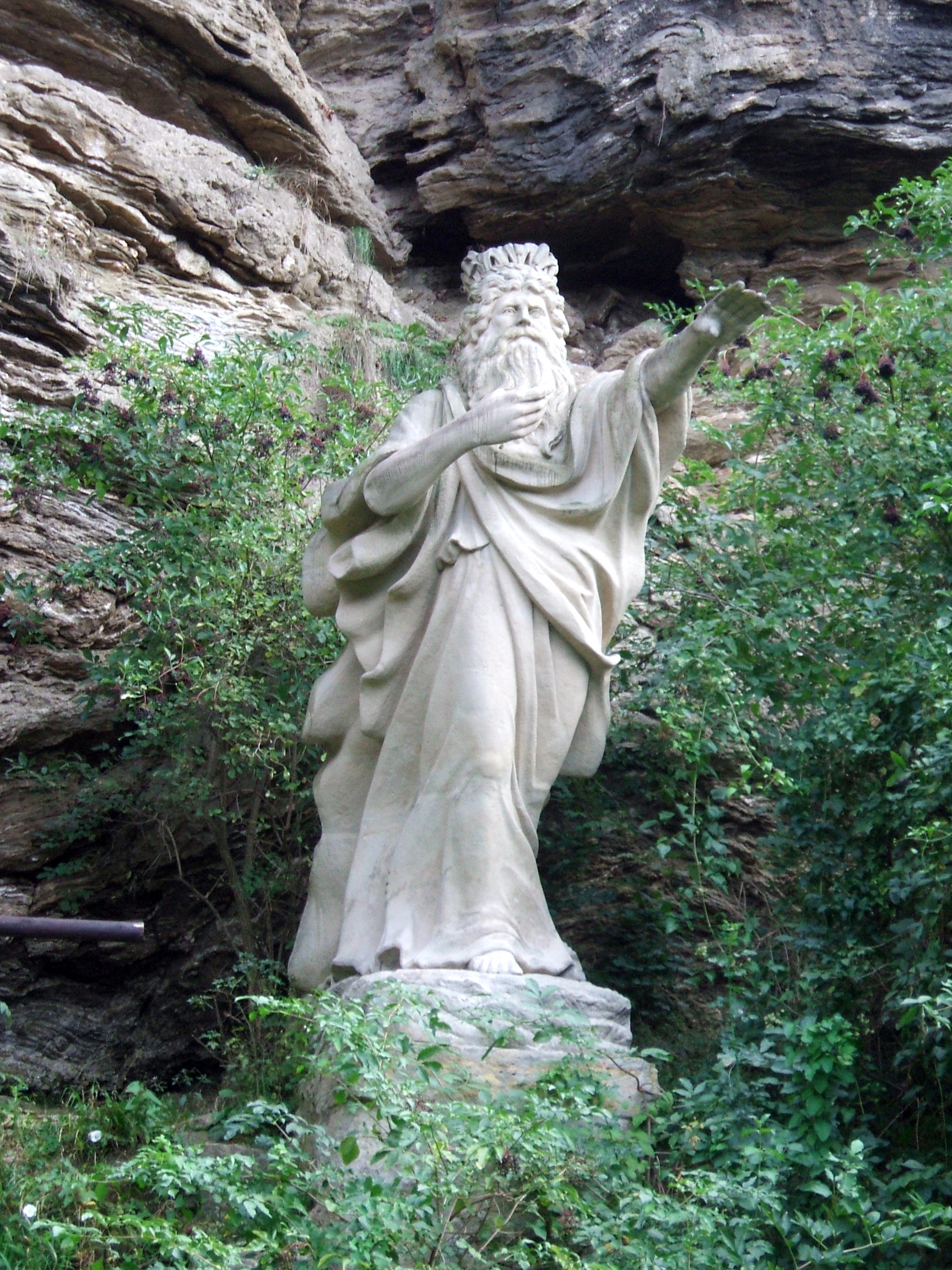
Monument to Goethe's "Erlkönig" in Jena at the place where the rider in the poem supposedly met the Erlkönig

In European folklore and myth, the Erlking is a sinister elf who lingers in the woods. He stalks children who stay in the woods for too long and kills them with a single touch.

The name "Erlking" (German: Erlkönig, lit. 'alder-king'; German: [ˈɛʁlkøːnɪç, -nɪk]) is a name used in German Romanticism for the figure of a spirit or "king of the fairies". It is usually assumed that the name is a derivation from the ellekonge (older elverkonge, i.e. "Elf-king") in Danish folklore.

The name was first used by Johann Gottfried Herder in his ballad Erlkönigs Tochter (1778), an adaptation of the Danish folk ballad Hr. Oluf han rider (1739), and was taken up by Johann Wolfgang von Goethe in his poem Erlkönig (1782), which was set to music by Schubert and others. Goethe added a new meaning, as "Erl" means not "elf" but "black alder", and the poem about the Erlenkönig is set in the area of an alder quarry in the Saale Valley, in Thuringia. In English translations of Goethe's poem, the name is sometimes rendered as Erl-king.

== Origin ==
According to the early linguist Jacob Grimm, the term originates with a Scandinavian word, ellekonge, Danish for "king of the elves", or for a female spirit elverkongens datter "the elven king's daughter", who is responsible for ensnaring human beings to satisfy her desire, jealousy or lust for revenge. The New Oxford American Dictionary follows that explanation by describing the Erlking as "a bearded giant or goblin who lures little children to the land of death", which was mistranslated by Herder as Erlkönig in the late 18th century from ellerkonge. The correct German word would have been Elbkönig or Elbenkönig, which was later used under the modified form of Elfenkönig by Christoph Martin Wieland in his 1780 poem Oberon.

Alternative suggestions have also been made; in 1836, Halling suggested a connection with a Turkic and Mongolian god of death or psychopomp, known as Erlik Khan.

== In German romantic literature ==
=== The Erlking's Daughter ===
Johann Gottfried von Herder introduced this character into German literature in "Erlkönigs Tochter", a ballad published in his 1778 volume Stimmen der Völker in Liedern. It was based on the Danish folk ballad Hr. Oluf han rider, which was published in the 1739 Danske Kæmpeviser. Herder undertook a free translation in which he translated the Danish elvermø ("elf maid") as Erlkönigs Tochter; according to Danish legend, old burial mounds are the residence of the elverkonge, dialectically elle(r)konge; the latter has later been misunderstood in Denmark by some antiquarians as "alder king", cf Danish elletræ "alder tree". It has generally been assumed that the mistranslation was the result of error, but it has also been suggested (Herder actually also refers to elves in his translation) that he was imaginatively trying to identify the malevolent sprite of the original tale with a woodland old man (hence the alder king).

The story portrays Sir Oluf riding to his marriage but being entranced by the music of the elves. An elf maiden, (in Herder's translation, the Elverkonge's daughter) appears and invites him to dance with her. He refuses and spurns her offers of gifts and gold. Angered, she strikes him and sends him on his way, deathly pale. The following morning, on the day of his wedding, his bride finds him lying dead under his scarlet cloak.

=== Goethe's Erlkönig ===
Although inspired by Herder's ballad, Johann Wolfgang von Goethe departed significantly from both Herder's rendering of the Erlking and the Scandinavian original. The antagonist in Goethe's Der Erlkönig is the Erlking himself rather than his daughter. The Erlkönig appears to a young boy seeing a spirit, but his father sees the apparition as a simple streak of fog. Goethe's Erlking differs in other ways as well since his version preys on children, rather than adults of the opposite sex, and the Erlking's motives are never made clear.
