= Iceland Review =

Icelandic English-language magazine

- 2006 cover for the Design Issue. Design by Katrín Ólína
- Editor: Michael Chapman
- Categories: Icelandic culture, politics, social issues
- First issue: August 1963
- Country: Iceland
- Based in: Reykjavík
- Language: English
- Website: icelandreview.com
- ISSN: 0019-1094

Iceland Review is Iceland's oldest English-language media outlet, with the first issue of the magazine having first been published in August 1963.

Today, Iceland Review publishes stories about Icelandic society, politics, pop culture, music, art, literature, current events, as well as interviews with notable Icelanders, travel articles, and photo essays.

As of 2025, Iceland Review operates online only.
