= National and University Library of Iceland =

National library of Iceland

Coordinates: 64°08′34″N 21°57′02″W

Landsbókasafn Íslands – Háskólabókasafn
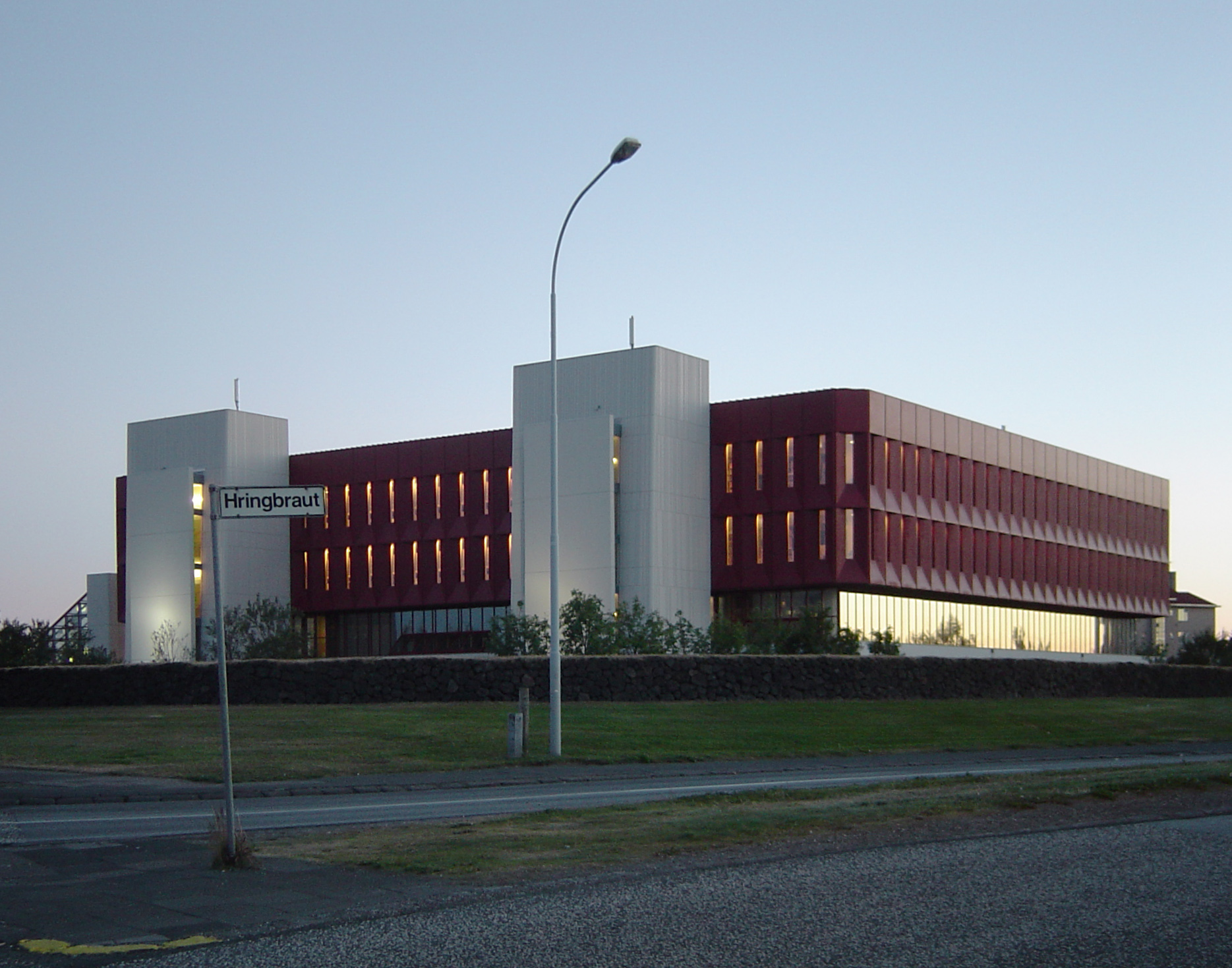
- Þjóðarbókhlaðan, the library's main building
- Location: Reykjavík, Iceland
- Type: National, academic
- Established: 1818

Collection
- Items collected: Books, newspapers, journals, sound recordings
- Legal deposit: Yes

Other information
- Website: www.landsbokasafn.is

Landsbókasafn Íslands – Háskólabókasafn (Icelandic: [ˈlan(t)sˌpouːkaˌsapn ˈistlan(t)s – ˈhauːˌskouːlaˌpouːkaˌsapn̥]; English: The National and University Library of Iceland) is the national library of Iceland which also functions as the university library of the University of Iceland. The library was established on 1 December 1994 in Reykjavík, Iceland, with the merger of the former national library, Landsbókasafn Íslands (est. 1818), and the university library (formally est. 1940). It is the largest library in Iceland with about one million items in various collections. The library's largest collection is the national collection containing almost all written works published in Iceland and items related to Iceland published elsewhere. The library is the main legal deposit library in Iceland. The library also has a large manuscript collection with mostly early modern and modern manuscripts, and a collection of published Icelandic music and other audio (legal deposit since 1977). The library houses the largest academic collection in Iceland, most of which can be borrowed for off-site use by holders of library cards. University students get library cards for free, but anyone can acquire a card for a small fee. The library is open for public access.

The library main building is called Þjóðarbókhlaðan [ˈθjouːðarˌpoukˌl̥aːðan]. It is a prominent 13,000-square-metre (140,000 sq ft) red and white building near the main campus of the University of Iceland and the National Museum of Iceland. The building took 16 years to complete, finally opening in 1994, the year of the Icelandic republic's 50th anniversary.

== History ==
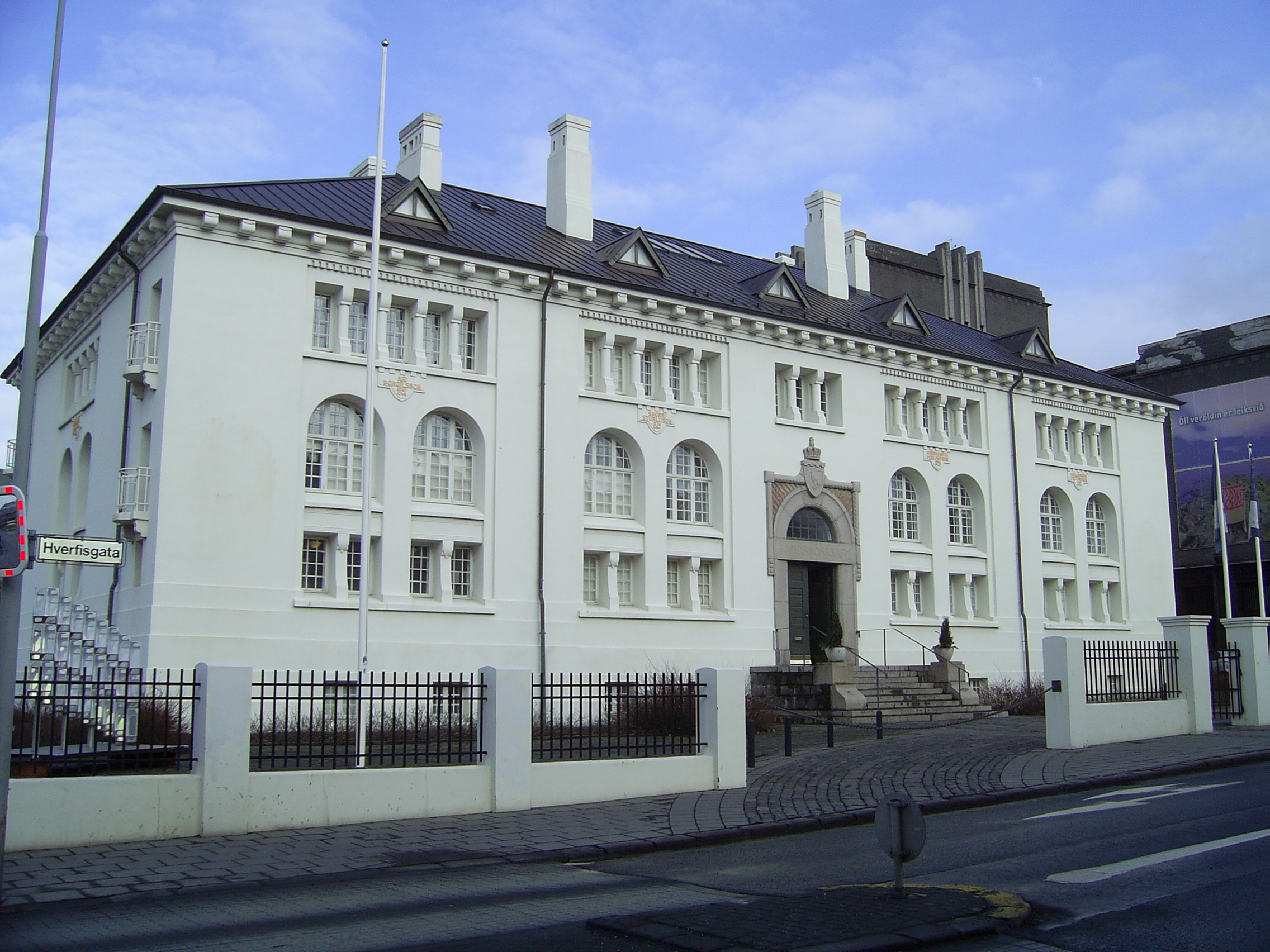
Safnahúsið, where the National Library of Iceland was from 1908 to 1994

The first national library of Iceland, Íslands stiftisbókasafn, was established at the instigation of Danish antiquarian Carl Christian Rafn and the Icelandic Literary Society in 1818, and the first books of the library were gifts from Icelanders and Danes. From 1825, the library was housed in the loft of the newly renovated Reykjavík Cathedral. In 1848, the first national librarian, folklorist Jón Árnason, was hired to manage it. In 1847, the manuscript collection was started with the purchase of a large collection of manuscripts from the estate of bishop Steingrímur Jónsson. On the occasion of the 1000th anniversary of the settlement of Iceland in 1874 the library received many gifts. In 1883, Jón Árnason estimated the total number of volumes in the library at 20,000.

In 1881, the library moved into the new house of parliament, Alþingishús, and in 1886, the first Icelandic print law establishing the library as a legal deposit library was passed by the Alþingi. After this, the library grew fast and on its 100th anniversary in 1918, it counted 100,000 volumes. In 1906–1908, a special building, Safnahúsið, was erected to house the National Library, the National Museum, the Icelandic National Archives, and the Icelandic Natural History Museum.

The library of the University of Iceland was formally established in 1940 when the university moved into the Main Building. Before that time the individual departments had their own libraries. At the time it was debated whether it was practical to develop two academic state libraries in Iceland. In 1947, a committee was established to decide on a division of tasks between them. Soon, a merger of the two libraries was proposed. In 1956 and 1966, two committees were set up to prepare for this eventuality. It seemed clear that a new specially designed building close to the university would be required. The idea was that this new library building, Þjóðarbókhlaðan, would be opened in 1974 on the 1100th anniversary of the settlement of Iceland. The two libraries began working towards this end and UNESCO library experts were consulted as to the requirements of the new building.

As the year 1974 drew near it became increasingly clear, however, that the Icelandic state would not be able to construct the building in time. The 1973 Oil Crisis, among other things, resulted in a worsening of the state's finances meaning that most of the ideas for the anniversary year had to be significantly reduced or scrapped. A groundbreaking ceremony for the new library was planned, instead of an inauguration, but even this was postponed until 1978 when construction finally began. Initially the building project proceeded and in 1983 the building was complete on the outside. However, significant funds were needed to complete the interior and for the next ten years the large building stood empty. Attempts were made to finance its completion with a special supplement on property tax, but most of that income was used for other expenses. Finally in 1991, the new government of Sjálfstæðisflokkurinn and Alþýðuflokkurinn made it a priority to complete the building, and on 1 December 1994 it opened.

While a lot of debate surrounded the building of Þjóðarbókhlaðan at the time, it resulted in vastly improved consultation, study and research facilities for researchers, university students and the general public in Iceland. The combination of the two libraries in one building resulted in an accessible library where users have direct access to the academic collection and reference works on the shelves while the national and manuscript collections are available for on-site consultation in a separate reading hall.

From 1888 to 1979, the National Library published a list of new books acquired each year. In 1979, this was replaced by the Icelandic National Bibliography, containing an overview of Icelandic published books each year. In October 1991, the two libraries implemented a joint online public access catalog system, Gegnir, gradually replacing the card catalogs. Since 2001, this system has been implemented nationwide for all public libraries in Iceland and is managed by a consortium. As of 2008, Gegnir can also be consulted via the European Library.

Since 1996 the library has engaged in several large digitisation projects providing open access to antique maps of Iceland (1998): Timarit.is – journals and newspapers (2002 in collaboration with the National Library of the Faroe Islands and the National Library of Greenland) –, Handrit.is – a catalog and digital library of manuscripts (in collaboration with the Árni Magnússon Institute for Icelandic Studies and the Arnamagnæan Institute) –, and the online Icelandic National Bibliography (2008) among others.

The library signed the Berlin Declaration on Open Access to Knowledge in the Sciences and Humanities in September 2012.

== Administration and roles ==
The roles of the National and University Library are defined with a special law dating from 2011 and related regulations. The library is defined as an independent higher education institution under the Icelandic Ministry of Education, Science and Culture which commissions the library board, consisting of seven members, and the National Librarian.

Administratively the library is divided into five sections; conservation, services, communication, acquisitions and administration. The section heads form the library executive board, along with the National Librarian.

The library has the duty to collect and catalog all published Icelandic print, electronic and audio material for preservation and continued access. It is to manage its extensive manuscript collection and ensure the continued conservation of all the materials it collects. The library collects materials partly through receiving the legal deposit from publishers and partly through acquisitions and gifts.

The legal deposit is defined in a special law dating from 2001 where the collection of electronic material published on the World Wide Web is defined as being one of the tasks of the library. Currently, the library collects snapshots of all web pages within the Icelandic top-level domain .is using the Heritrix web crawler.

The library is the ISBN and ISSN national center in Iceland. It is also the national center for interlibrary loans. It has the role of coordinator for the national OPAC, Gegnir.

The library has the duty to provide information and library service to the general public. It has a special duty to support the needs of teaching and research at the University of Iceland. The library manages subscriptions to scientific databases and electronic journals for the university and administers the office for national access to bibliographic databases and electronic journals, hvar.is, jointly financed by the Icelandic state and a consortium of Icelandic libraries, schools and research institutions and companies.

== Collections ==
=== Reference section ===
The reference section of the library contains reference works, manuals, encyclopedias, dictionaries and bibliographic registries etc. for on-site consultation. Within the reference section there are also computers for consulting the OPAC and for general use by guests. As these are part of the Internet of the University of Iceland, they have access to all electronic reference works that the university subscribes to in addition to the library subscriptions. The same applies to the wireless Internet hotspot available in the whole building. Part of the collection of reference works is available in the reading hall of the national and manuscript collections.

=== National collection ===
The national collection comprises all Icelandic published material in print, electronic or audiographic form collected through the legal deposit or acquired by other means. The library actively collects materials relating to Iceland published elsewhere and not subject to the Icelandic law on legal deposit. This equally applies to materials published online. This way, the library has created the most complete collection of Icelandic materials available anywhere in the world which it conserves, stores and makes available for on-site use in a special reading hall it shares with the manuscript collections. Access to highly valuable and rare items is restricted, but the library usually tries to make these available through its digital imaging production line. Within the national collection there are some private collections of individuals that are stored separately.

=== Manuscript collections ===
The library manuscript collections contain some 15,000 items, the oldest vellum manuscripts dating from around 1100 and are among the earliest examples of written Icelandic. Most of the collections are paper manuscripts, the oldest ones dating from the end of the 16th century. The youngest items are collections of manuscripts and letters, including electronic materials, from contemporary people which include some of Iceland's most prominent literary figures such as Halldór Laxness. The manuscript collections of the library can be consulted in a separate reading hall where the items are provided by request for on-site use. Some of the manuscripts are cataloged in registers which are available in digital form on the library website. The library is currently working on creating an online catalog for manuscripts jointly with the Árni Magnússon Institute for Icelandic Studies in Reykjavík and the Arnamagnæan Institute in Copenhagen.

=== Audiovisual collection ===
The audiovisual collection of the library is available for on-site use using special facilities, screens and headphones, provided by the library. The collection includes materials that are part of the national collection as well as a large collection of international materials, records, films, television programs etc. The main emphasis of the collection, however, is to collect all Icelandic material and make it available to library guests.

=== Academic collection ===
The bulk of the academic collection consists of materials from the original library of the University of Iceland. It contains international scientific works and textbooks along with literary works in many languages, including a large collection of translations of Icelandic literature. By request, the library reserves textbooks used in courses taught at the University of Iceland to ensure that they are available for on-site study. Most of the academic collection, however, can be borrowed for off-site use by holders of library cards issued by the library. Students at the University of Iceland get such cards for free. Parts of the collection are available in two library branches on campus.

== See also ==
- Árni Magnússon Institute for Icelandic Studies
- Handrit.is
- Timarit.is
- University of Iceland
- Skemman.is
- List of libraries in Iceland
