= Ævar Örn Jósepsson =

Icelandic journalist, translator, and author

Ævar Örn Jósepsson (born 25 August 1963 in Hafnarfjörður) is an Icelandic journalist, translator, and author.

== Early life ==
Ævar is the youngest of four siblings. He grew up in Garðabær, Reykjavík, and in Hafnarfjörður. He moved to Akranes aged 16. From 1981-1982 he was an exchange student in Belgium. He attended the University of Stirling in Scotland, UK, from 1986-1987 and studied journalism, political science and philosophy. He then attended Albert-Ludwigs Universität in Freiburg, Germany, becoming Magister Artium of philosophy and English literature in 1994.

== Career ==
Ævar initially worked as a fisherman, then as from 1984-1986 as a bank clerk for Landsbanki Íslands. He started doing programs for television and radio, working at RÚV radio since 1995.

He worked as a journalist for Þjóðviljinn, Morgunblaðið, visir.is, Ský and others.

== Writing ==
Ævar has written a series of six crime novels.

- Skítadjobb (2002) ISBN 9789979326120.
- Svartir englar (2003) ISBN 9789979217640 (later made into a film series of the same name.)
- Blóðberg (2005) ISBN 9789979659105.
- Sá yðar sem syndlaus er (2006) ISBN 9789979977247.
- Land tækifæranna (2008) (nominated for the Glass Key award.) ISBN 9789979659280.
- Önnur líf (2010) ISBN 9789979659525.

He has also written a short story called Línudans, published in Spannendsten Weihnachtgeschichten aus Skandinavien (2004).

== See also ==
- List of Icelandic writers
