= Freedomland =

Freedomland may refer to:

- Freedomland U.S.A., a theme park in New York City (1960–1964)
- Freedomland (novel), 1998, a mystery by Richard Price
  - Freedomland (film), a 2006 adaptation of Price's novel, starring Samuel L. Jackson and Julianne Moore
- Freedomland (play), a 1998 comedy by Amy Freed whose title references the New York City amusement park
- The Free Territory of Freedomland, a micronation in the South China Sea (1956–1974)
