= Icelandic outvasion =

The Icelandic "outvasion" (Icelandic: útrás [ˈuːtraus]) was the period in the economic history of Iceland between 2000 and the onset of its financial crisis in October 2008. With the privatisation of the Icelandic banks being advantageous for investors, there was a large supply of cheap loan capital on the international market. A clause in the agreement with the European Economic Area stipulated the free flow of capital to and from Iceland.

The so-called outvasion entailed Icelandic financiers (sometimes styled útrásarvíkingar, 'outvasion Vikings') to purchase many foreign businesses, particularly in the retail sector. The British retailers Debenhams, Woolworths, Hamleys, and others came into full or part-Icelandic possession, in addition to the Danish companies Magasin du Nord and Royal Unibrew. Novator Partners acquired telecoms and other assets around Europe, including České Radiokomunikace, Elisa, Saunalahti, Bulgarian Telecommunications Company, P4 Spółka z o.o., Netia, and Forthnet.

== Terminology ==
The English term outvasion was coined by the Icelandic media as a calque on the Icelandic term útrás. Út means 'out'; rás, in this context, means 'a rush, race, sprint, expansion'; and útrás correspondingly means outward rush. It was used to describe the Icelandic bankers as brave Vikings raiding the world via acquiring businesses.

== Investigations ==
In 2005 a group of Danish journalists found that Thor Björgólfsson, his father Björgólfur Guðmundsson and friend Magnús Þorsteinsson all have background in Russia, where they ran beverage businesses in the 1990s before moving to Iceland. They provided details about their activities in Russia. Icelandic links to Russia were also highlighted by The Guardian newspaper article "Next-generation Viking invasion - They've got the cash to buy big UK groups like M&S. But where does it come from?" in 2005.

Furthermore, investigations have identified six British Virgin Islands-based shareholders behind Icelandic banks and companies such as Glitnir, Landsbanki (and its Internet brand Icesave), Kaupthing, Baugur Group and Exista: Starbook International Limited, Waverton Group Limited, Birefield Holdings Limited, Shapburg Limited, Quenon Investments Limited, and Liftwood Investments Limited. All six are registered in P.O. Box 3186 Road Town, Tortola, British Virgin Islands.

Documents available on Luxembourg authorities' website and discovered by Danish journalists show that Shapburg Limited and Quenon Investment Limited owned a stake in Luxembourg-based Alrosa Finance, a subsidiary of Russian state-owned diamond company ALROSA. Shapburg Limited also owned a stake in Luxembourg-based Alfa Finance Holdings, a subsidiary of Alfa-Bank of Russia.

== Outcomes ==
The Icelandic outvasion period ended in October 2008 with the downfall and default of the three leading Icelandic banks, Kaupthing, Landsbanki and Glitnir, totalling $85bn of debt, that led directly to the collapse of the national currency, the government and much of the economy.

In September 2010, Geir Haarde, the former prime minister, became the first Icelandic minister to be indicted for misconduct in office. He was convicted for not holding cabinet meetings when things turned critical, but has been found not guilty of negligence over the 2008 financial crisis.

On December 12, 2013, Hreiðar Már Sigurðsson, former CEO of Kaupthing Bank, was sentenced to five and a half years in prison for his part in a market manipulation case involving Sheikh Mohammed Bin Khalifa Bin Hamad al-Thani's purchase of a 5.1% share in Kaupthing Bank weeks before the bank collapsed in October 2008. This was, at the time, the heaviest sentence for financial fraud in Iceland's history. Three other executives were also sentenced to jail. The verdict was appealed later, but the Supreme court upheld the previous verdict on February 12, 2015.

Thor Björgólfsson, the former owner of Landsbanki, lost most of his wealth, but personally owned up to his debt and managed to settle up with creditors. By the autumn of 2014, he regained his previous status, primarily because of the Actavis acquisition by Watson Pharmaceuticals.
