= Sigrún Davíðsdóttir =

Icelandic journalist and writer

Sigrún Davíðsdóttir (born 1955) is an Icelandic journalist and writer. She became the London correspondent for the Icelandic national broadcaster RÚV in 2000 and has been nominated as RÚV's Reporter of the Year. She is particularly noted for her coverage, since the 2008 Icelandic financial crisis, of financial crime, tax avoidance, and corruption, documented through her blog Icelog. She has, however, published a wide variety of books alongside her journalism.

== Biography ==
Sigrún has three sons: Ingvar, Davíð and Ari Helgason. She moved from Iceland to Denmark in 1988, where she wrote a study of the return of manuscripts from Denmark to Iceland in the 1970s, before moving to London to work for RÚV in 2000.

== Books ==
=== Cookery books ===
- Matreiðslubók handa ungu fólki á öllum aldri (Reykjavík: Almenna bókafélagið, 1978)
- Matur: sumar, vetur, vor og haust (Reykjavík: Almenna bókafélagið, 1980)
- Brjóstagjöf og barnamatur (Reykjavík: Almenna bókafélagið, 1982)
- Pottarím (Reykjavík: Íslenski kiljuklúbburinn, 1987)

=== Novels ===
- Silfur Egils (Reykjavík: Almenna bókafélagið, 1989) [winner of the Reykjavík City Literary Award 1990]
- Feimnismál (Reykjavík: Mál og menning, 2006) [referred to in some sources by its intended English title, Uchronia]
- Samhengi hlutanna (Akranes: Uppheimar, 2011) [referred to in some sources by its intended English title, Not a Single Word]

=== Research ===
- Håndskriftsagens saga i politisk belysning, trans. by Kim Lembek, Odense University studies in history and social sciences, 216 (Odense: Odense Universitetsforlag, 1999), ISBN 8778389984, ISBN 9788778389985
- "Útrás íslenskra fyrirtækja til Lundúna", ed. by Þór Sigfússon and Halldór Benjamín Þorbergsson, based on an idea and interviews by Sigrún Davíðsdóttir (Reykjavík: Viðskiptaráð Íslands, 2005)

=== Anthologies ===
- Antologi ur modern isländsk litteratur, ed. by Sigrún Davíðsdóttir and Steingrímur Þórðarson (Reykjavík, 1980)

=== Translations ===
Sigrún has also translated numerous books, including food-writing and several of the Beatrix Potter children's books.
