= Böðvar Guðmundsson =

Icelandic writer

Böðvar Guðmundsson (born 9 January 1939) is an Icelandic writer. He grew up in Borgarfjörður, specifically Kirkjuból í Hvítársíðu. He is known for plays, poetry, novels, and children's books. He is said to be best known for the novels Híbýli vindanna (1995; Where the Winds Dwell) and Lífsins tré (1996; Tree of Life) He has done numerous translations of writers such as Roald Dahl and Heinrich Böll. He was a teacher and guest lecturer at the University of Bergen in the 1980s. He was at one time married to the Icelandic literary scholar Helga Kress. He lives in Denmark and is still writing.

Böðvar's most recent novels are the novel Enn er morgunn ([Akranes]: Uppheimar, 2009; ISBN 9789979659518; 9789979659730), his fourth, which is about Nazi sympathisers in Iceland around the Second World War and which led to controversy when Böðvar's ex-wife Helga demanded its recall, reading it as a personal attack on the reputation of her parents Bruno Kress and Kristína Thoroddsen; and Töfrahöllin ([Akranes]: Uppheimar, 2012; ISBN 9789935432742; 9935432742), his fifth.

== See also ==
- List of Icelandic writers
- Icelandic literature
