= Sigríður =

- Gender: Female

Origin
- Region of origin: Iceland

Other names
- Related names: Sigrid, Siri

Sigríður is one of the most frequently given female names in Iceland. In 2004, it was ranked third behind Anna and Guðrún.

According to Icelandic custom, people are generally referred to by first and middle names and patronyms are used only if disambiguation is required.

== Notable people ==
- Arna Sigríður Albertsdóttir (born 1990), Icelandic handcyclist
- Sigríður Á. Andersen (born 1971), Icelandic politician
- Sigríður Beinteinsdóttir (born 1962), Icelandic singer, known as Sigga
- Sigríður J. Friðjónsdóttir (born 1961), Icelandic prosecutor
- Sigríður Lára Garðarsdóttir (born 1994), Icelandic footballer
- Þorbjörg Sigríður Gunnlaugsdóttir (born 1978), Icelandic politician
- Sigríður Hagalín (1926–1992), Icelandic actress
- Sigríður Ingibjörg Ingadóttir (born 1968), Icelandic politician
- Sigríður Jóhannesdóttir (born 1943), Icelandic politician
- Sigríður Dúna Kristmundsdóttir (born 1952), Icelandic anthropologist
- Sigríður Níelsdóttir (1930–2011), Icelandic musician, known as Grandma Lo-Fi
- Sigríður Sigurjónsdóttir (born 1960), Icelandic academic
- Sigríður Ásdís Snævarr (born 1952), Icelandic diplomat
- Sigríður Anna Þórðardóttir (born 1946), Icelandic politician
- Sigríður Þorláksdóttir Baxter (born 1977), Icelandic skier
- Sigríður Þorsteinsdóttir (1841–1924), Icelandic editor
- Anna Sigríður Þorvaldsdóttir (born 1977), Icelandic composer
- Sigríður Tómasdóttir (1871–1957), Icelandic environmentalist
- Sigríður Zoëga (1889–1968), Icelandic photographer

== See also ==
- Sigrid
