= Gudrun (disambiguation) =

Gudrun is the sister of Gunnar and wife of Sigurd in Norse mythology.

Gudrun may also refer to:

- Gudrun (given name)
- Guðrún, an Icelandic given name (includes variants such as Gudrun)
- Kudrun, also known as Gudrun, a German medieval epic and its main character
- 328 Gudrun, a main belt asteroid
- Gudrun (storm), a European windstorm
- Gudrun (whale), an orca that lived in Dolfinarium Harderwijk (Harderwijk, Netherlands) and SeaWorld (Orlando, Florida, US).
- Gudrun (1963 film), a 1963 Danish film, the English title of which is Suddenly, a Woman!
- Gudrun (1992 film), a 1992 German film
