= Siri =

Software-based personal assistant from Apple

- The Apple Intelligence Siri logo in iOS 18, macOS Sequoia, and non AI compatible iPhones

- Screenshot Apple Intelligence-based Siri running on iOS 18.1
- Original author: Siri Inc.
- Developer: Apple
- Release: October 14, 2011; 15 years ago
- Operating system: iPhone 4S and newer, iOS 6 onward and iPad 3rd generation and newer, macOS Sierra onward, tvOS, watchOS, iPadOS, visionOS
- Platform: iPhone; iPad; iPod Touch; Mac; Apple TV; Apple Watch; HomePod; Apple Vision Pro; Some third party devices
- Successor: Siri AI
- Available in: Arabic; Chinese: (Cantonese, Mandarin); Danish; Dutch; English; Finnish; French; German; Hebrew; Italian; Japanese; Korean; Kannada; Telugu; Bengali; Marathi; Malay; Norwegian; Portuguese; Russian; Spanish; Swedish; Thai; Hindi; Turkish; Vietnamese (developer beta)
- Type: Virtual assistant
- License: Proprietary software
- Website: apple.com/siri

Siri (/ˈsɪri/ SEER-ee) is an intelligent assistant and chatbot purchased, developed, and popularized by Apple, which is included in the iOS, iPadOS, watchOS, macOS, Apple TV, audioOS, and visionOS operating systems. It uses voice queries, gesture based control, focus-tracking and a natural-language user interface to answer questions, make recommendations, and perform actions by delegating requests to a set of Internet services. With continued use, it adapts to users' individual language usages, searches, and preferences, returning individualized results.

Siri is a spin-off from a project developed by the SRI International Artificial Intelligence Center. Its speech recognition engine was provided by Nuance Communications, and it uses advanced machine learning technologies to function. Its original American, British, and Australian voice actors recorded their respective voices around 2005, unaware of the recordings' eventual usage. Siri was released as an app for iOS in December 2010. Two months later, Apple acquired it and integrated it into the iPhone 4s at its release on October 14, 2011, removing the separate app from the iOS App Store. Siri has since been an integral part of Apple's products, having been adapted into other hardware devices including newer iPhone models, iPad, iPod Touch, Mac, AirPods, Apple TV, HomePod, and Apple Vision Pro.

Siri supports a wide range of user commands, including performing phone actions, checking basic information, scheduling events and reminders, handling device settings, searching the Internet, navigating areas, finding information on entertainment, and being able to engage with iOS-integrated apps. With the release of iOS 10, in 2016, Apple opened up limited third-party access to Siri, including third-party messaging apps, as well as payments, ride-sharing, and Internet calling apps. With the release of iOS 11, Apple updated Siri's voice and added support for follow-up questions, language translation, and additional third-party actions. iOS 17 and iPadOS 17 enabled users to activate Siri by simply saying "Siri", while the previous command, "Hey Siri", is still supported.

In 2024, Apple added initial large language model functionality to Siri in iOS 18, iPadOS 18, and macOS Sequoia, including ChatGPT integration. In 2025, Apple announced that a broader overhaul of Siri based on Apple Intelligence, intended to enable increased personalization, would be delayed due to technical challenges. In September 2026, an enhanced version called Siri AI was introduced to devices that support Apple Intelligence with iOS 27, iPadOS 27, macOS Golden Gate, visionOS 27, and watchOS 27.

== Development ==
Siri is a spin-out from the Stanford Research Institute's Artificial Intelligence Center and is an offshoot of the US Defense Advanced Research Projects Agency's (DARPA)-funded CALO project. SRI International used the NABC Framework to define the value proposition for Siri. It was co-founded by Dag Kittlaus, Tom Gruber, and Adam Cheyer. Kittlaus named Siri after a co-worker in Norway; the name is a short form of the name Sigrid, from Old Norse Sigríðr, composed of the elements sigr "victory" and fríðr "beautiful".

Siri's speech recognition engine was provided by Nuance Communications, a speech technology company. Neither Apple nor Nuance acknowledged this for years, until Nuance CEO Paul Ricci confirmed it at a 2013 technology conference. The speech recognition system uses sophisticated machine learning techniques, including convolutional neural networks and long short-term memory.

The initial Siri prototype was implemented using the Active platform, a joint project between the Artificial Intelligence Center of SRI International and the Vrai Group at École Polytechnique Fédérale de Lausanne. The Active platform was the focus of a PhD thesis led by Didier Guzzoni, who joined Siri as its chief scientist.

Siri was acquired by Apple in April 2011 under the direction of Steve Jobs. Apple's first notion of a digital personal assistant appeared in a 1987 concept video, Knowledge Navigator.

Siri's original release on the iPhone 4s in October 2011 received mixed reviews. It received praise for its voice recognition and contextual knowledge of user information, including calendar appointments, but was criticized for requiring stiff user commands and having a lack of flexibility. It was also criticized for lacking information on certain nearby places and for its inability to understand certain English accents. During the mid-2010s, a number of media reports said that Siri lacked innovation, particularly against new competing voice assistants. The reports concerned Siri's limited set of features, "bad" voice recognition, and undeveloped service integrations as causing trouble for Apple in the field of artificial intelligence and cloud-based services; the basis for the complaints reportedly due to stifled development, as caused by Apple's prioritization of user privacy and executive power struggles within the company. Its launch was also overshadowed by the death of Steve Jobs, which occurred one day after the launch.

According to The Wall Street Journal, Siri was one of the dumbest chatbots on the market. It is estimated that the concern has clear advantages to lead in consumer AI, but only if they can finally modernize Siri. Consequently, Apple's broader artificial intelligence strategy shifted toward an architectural modernization of the assistant to bridge this competitive gap. This overhaul was officially unveiled during Apple's Worldwide Developers Conference (WWDC) on June 8, 2026, with the introduction of "Siri AI". Developed in partnership with Google Gemini, the updated system integrated onscreen awareness, contextual personalization, and multi-app task orchestration natively across the ecosystem.

== Apple Intelligence ==
In macOS Sequoia, iOS 18, and iPadOS 18, Siri now uses Apple Intelligence.

The sound of Apple Intelligence powered Siri

In 2026, Apple announced that it has selected Google Gemini to "power AI features like Siri".

== Voices ==
The original American voice of Siri was recorded in July 2005 by Susan Bennett, who was unaware it would eventually be used for the voice assistant. A report from The Verge in September 2013 about voice actors, their work, and machine learning developments, hinted that Allison Dufty was the voice behind Siri, but this was disproven when Dufty wrote on her website that she was "absolutely, positively not the voice of Siri". Citing growing pressure, Bennett revealed her role as Siri in October, and her claim was confirmed by Ed Primeau, an American audio forensics expert. Apple has never acknowledged it.

The original British male voice was provided by Jon Briggs, a former technology journalist and for 12 years narrated for the hit BBC quiz show The Weakest Link. After discovering he was Siri's voice by watching television, he first spoke about the role in November 2011. He acknowledged that the voice work was done "five or six years ago", and that he did not know how the recordings would be used.

The original Australian voice was provided by Karen Jacobsen, a voice-over artist known in Australia as the GPS girl.

In an interview between all three voice actors and The Guardian, Briggs said that "the original system was recorded for a US company called Scansoft, who were then bought by Nuance. Apple simply licensed it."

For iOS 11, Apple auditioned hundreds of candidates to find new female voices, then recorded several hours of speech, including different personalities and expressions, to build a new text-to-speech voice based on deep learning technology. In February 2022, Apple added Quinn, its first gender-neutral voice, as a fifth user option to the iOS 15.4 developer release.

== Integration ==
Siri released as a stand-alone application for the iOS operating system in December 2010, and at the time, the developers were also intending to release Siri for Android and BlackBerry devices. Two months later, Apple acquired Siri. On October 14, 2011, Apple launched the iPhone 4S with a beta version of Siri. After the announcement, Apple removed the existing standalone Siri app from App Store. TechCrunch wrote that, though the Siri app supports iPhone 4, its removal from App Store might also have had a financial aspect for the company, in providing an incentive for customers to upgrade devices. Third-party developer Steven Troughton-Smith, however, managed to port Siri to iPhone 4, though without being able to communicate with Apple's servers. A few days later, Troughton-Smith, working with an anonymous person nicknamed "Chpwn", managed to fully hack Siri, enabling its full functionalities on iPhone 4 and iPod Touch devices. Additionally, developers were also able to successfully create and distribute legal ports of Siri to any device capable of running iOS 5, though a proxy server was required for Apple server interaction.

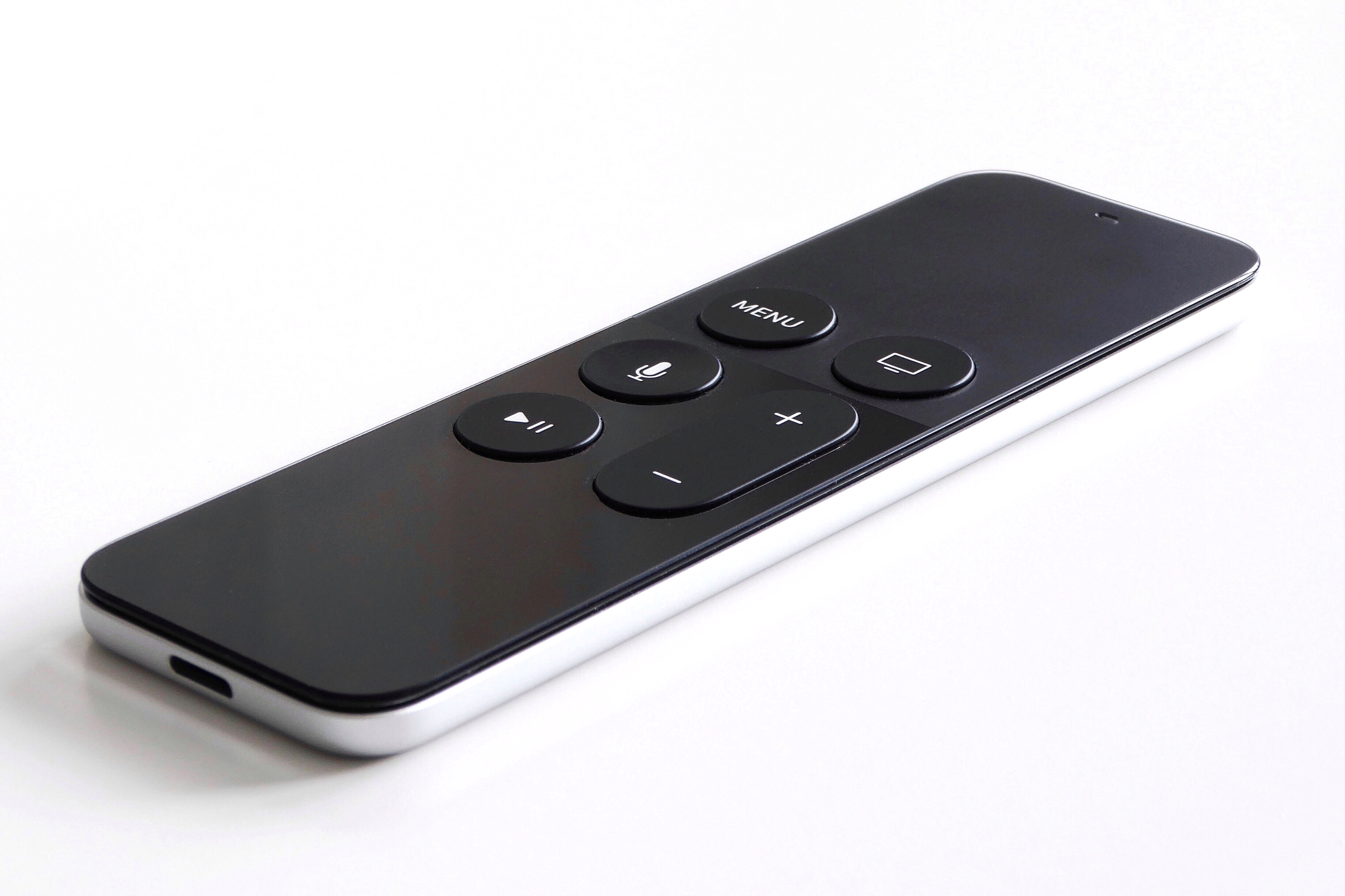
Siri Remote for the Apple TV

Over the years, Apple has expanded the line of officially supported products, including newer iPhone models, as well as iPad support in June 2012, iPod Touch support in September 2012, Apple TV support, and the stand-alone Siri Remote, in September 2015, Mac and AirPods support in September 2016, and HomePod support in February 2018.

=== Third-party devices ===
At the 2021 Worldwide Developers Conference, Apple announced that it would make Siri voice integration available in third-party devices. Devices must be on the same wireless network as a HomePod or HomePod Mini to route requests. In October 2021, the Ecobee SmartThermostat with Voice Control became the first third-party device with built-in Siri control. In 2024, Denon added Siri control to select soundbars and smart speakers.

== Features and options ==
Apple offers a wide range of voice commands to interact with Siri, including, but not limited to:

- Phone and text actions, such as "Call Sarah", "Read my new messages", "Set the timer for 10 minutes", and "Send email to mom"
- Check basic information, including "What's the weather like today?" and "How many dollars are in a euro?"
- Find basic facts, including "How many people live in France?" and "How tall is Mount Everest?". Siri usually uses Wikipedia to answer.
- Schedule events and reminders, including "Schedule a meeting" and "Remind me to ..."
- Handle device settings, such as "Take a picture", "Turn off Wi-Fi", and "Increase the brightness"
- Search the Internet, including "Define ...", "Find pictures of ...", and "Search Twitter for ..."
- Navigation, including "Take me home", "What's the traffic like on the way home?", and "Find driving directions to ..."
- Translate words and phrases from English to a few languages, such as "How do I say where is the nearest hotel in French?"
- Entertainment, such as "What basketball games are on today?", "What are some movies playing near me?", and "What's the synopsis of ...?"
- Engage with iOS-integrated apps, including "Pause Apple Music" and "Like this song"
- Handle payments through Apple Pay, such as "Apple Pay 25 dollars to Mike for concert tickets" or "Send 41 dollars to Ivana."
- Share ETA with others.
- Jokes, "Hey Siri, knock knock."

Siri also offers numerous pre-programmed responses to amusing questions. Such questions include "What is the meaning of life?" to which Siri may reply "All evidence to date suggests it's chocolate"; "Why am I here?", to which it may reply "I don't know. Frankly, I've wondered that myself"; and "Will you marry me?", to which it may respond with "My End User Licensing Agreement does not cover marriage. My apologies."

Initially limited to female voices for most countries where Siri was supported, Apple announced in June 2013 that Siri would feature a gender option, adding a male voice counterpart. Notable exceptions are the United Kingdom, France, and the Netherlands; those countries were first limited to male voices, then would later get female voice counterparts.

In September 2014, Apple added the ability for users to speak "Hey Siri" to summon the assistant without needing to hold the device.

In September 2015, the "Hey Siri" feature was updated to include individualized voice recognition, a presumed effort to prevent non-owner activation.

With the announcement of iOS 10 in June 2016, Apple opened up limited third-party developer access to Siri through a dedicated application programming interface (API). The API restricts the usage of Siri to engaging with third-party messaging apps, payment apps, ride-sharing apps, and Internet calling apps.

In iOS 11, Siri is able to handle follow-up questions, supports language translation, and opens up to more third-party actions, including task management. Additionally, users are able to type to Siri, and a new, privacy-minded "on-device learning" technique improves Siri's suggestions by privately analyzing personal usage of different iOS applications.

iOS 17 and iPadOS 17 allows users to simply say "Siri" to initiate Siri, and the virtual assistant now supports back to back requests, allowing users to issue multiple requests and conversations without reactivating it. In the public beta versions of iOS 17, iPadOS 17, and macOS Sonoma, Apple added support for bilingual queries to Siri.

iOS 18, iPadOS 18 and macOS Sequoia brought large language model integration using an Apple-created foundation model, as well as ChatGPT integral, to Siri. This was part of Apple's push into LLM-powered features, collectively named Apple Intelligence.

== Reception ==
Siri received mixed reviews during its beta release as an integrated part of the iPhone 4S in October 2011.

MG Siegler of TechCrunch wrote that Siri was "great", understood much more, but had "no API that any developer can use". Writing for the New York Times, David Pogue also praised Siri's ability to understand context Jacqui Cheng of Ars Technica wrote that Apple's claims of what Siri could do were bold, and the early demos "even bolder", this was still in beta.

While praising its ability to "decipher our casual language" and deliver "very specific and accurate result", sometimes even providing additional information, Cheng noted and criticized its restrictions, particularly when the language moved away from "stiffer commands" into more human interactions. One example included the phrase "Send a text to Jason, Clint, Sam, and Lee saying we're having dinner at Silver Cloud", which Siri interpreted as sending a message to Jason only, containing the text "Clint Sam and Lee saying we're having dinner at Silver Cloud." She also noted a lack of proper editability.

Google's executive chairman and former chief, Eric Schmidt, conceded that Siri could pose a competitive threat to the company's core search business.

Siri was criticized by pro-abortion rights organizations, including the American Civil Liberties Union (ACLU) and NARAL Pro-Choice America, after users found that Siri could not provide information about the location of birth control or abortion providers nearby, sometimes directing users to crisis pregnancy centers instead.

Natalie Kerris, a spokeswoman for Apple, told the New York Times that, "These are not intentional omissions...". In January 2016, Fast Company reported that, in then-recent months, Siri had begun to confuse the word "abortion" with "adoption", citing "health experts" who stated that the situation had "gotten worse". However, at the time of Fast Company's report, the situation had changed slightly, with Siri offering "a more comprehensive list of Planned Parenthood facilities", although "Adoption clinics continue to pop up, but near the bottom of the list."

Siri has also not been well received by some English speakers with distinctive accents, including Scottish and Americans from Boston or the South.

In March 2012, Frank M. Fazio filed a class action lawsuit against Apple on behalf of the people who bought the iPhone 4S and felt misled about the capabilities of Siri, alleging its failure to function as depicted in Apple's Siri commercials. Fazio filed the lawsuit in California and claimed that the iPhone 4S was merely a "more expensive iPhone 4" if Siri fails to function as advertised. On July 22, 2013, U.S. District Judge Claudia Wilken in San Francisco dismissed the suit but said the plaintiffs could amend at a later time. The reason given for dismissal was that plaintiffs did not sufficiently document enough misrepresentations by Apple for the trial to proceed.

== Perceived lack of innovation ==
In June 2016, The Verge's Sean O'Kane wrote about the then-upcoming major iOS 10 updates, with a headline stating "Siri's big upgrades won't matter if it can't understand its users":

What Apple didn't talk about was solving Siri's biggest, most basic flaws: it's still not very good at voice recognition, and when it gets it right, the results are often clunky. And these problems look even worse when you consider that Apple now has full-fledged competitors in this space: Amazon's Alexa, Microsoft's Cortana, and Google's Assistant.

Also writing for The Verge, Walt Mossberg had previously questioned Apple's efforts in cloud-based services, writing:

... perhaps the biggest disappointment among Apple's cloud-based services is the one it needs most today, right now: Siri. Before Apple bought it, Siri was on the road to being a robust digital assistant that could do many things, and integrate with many services—even though it was being built by a startup with limited funds and people. After Apple bought Siri, the giant company seemed to treat it as a backwater, restricting it to doing only a few, slowly increasing number of tasks, like telling you the weather, sports scores, movie and restaurant listings, and controlling the device's functions. Its unhappy founders have left Apple to build a new AI service called Viv. And, on too many occasions, Siri either gets things wrong, doesn't know the answer, or can't verbalize it. Instead, it shows you a web search result, even when you're not in a position to read it.

In October 2016, Bloomberg reported that Apple had plans to unify the teams behind its various cloud-based services, including a single campus and reorganized cloud computing resources aimed at improving the processing of Siri's queries, although another report from The Verge, in June 2017, once again called Siri's voice recognition "bad".

In June 2017, The Wall Street Journal published an extensive report on the lack of innovation with Siri following competitors' advancement in the field of voice assistants. Noting that Apple workers' anxiety levels "went up a notch" on the announcement of Amazon's Alexa, the Journal wrote: "Today, Apple is playing catch-up in a product category it invented, increasing worries about whether the technology giant has lost some of its innovation edge." The report gave the primary causes being Apple's prioritization of user privacy, including randomly-tagged six-month Siri searches, whereas Google and Amazon keep data until actively discarded by the user, and executive power struggles within Apple. Apple did not comment on the report, while Eddy Cue said: "Apple often uses generic data rather than user data to train its systems and has the ability to improve Siri's performance for individual users with information kept on their iPhones."

== Privacy controversy ==
In July 2019, a then-anonymous whistleblower and former Apple contractor Thomas le Bonniec said that Siri regularly records some of its users' conversations when activated, which often happened unintentionally. The recordings are sent to Apple contractors grading Siri's responses on a variety of factors. Among other things, the contractors regularly hear private conversations between doctors and patients, business and drug deals, and couples having sex. Apple did not disclose this in its privacy documentation and did not provide a way for its users to opt-in or out.

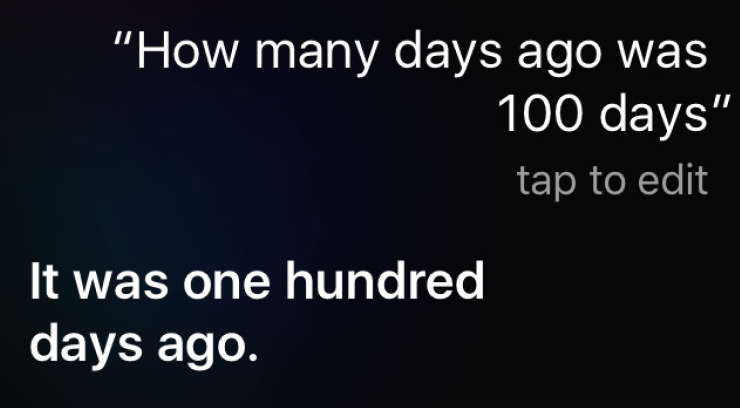
An example of a conversation with Siri

In August 2019, Apple apologized, halted the Siri grading program, and said that it plans to resume "later this fall when software updates are released to [its] users". The company also announced "it would no longer listen to Siri recordings without your permission". iOS 13.2, released in October 2019, introduced the ability to opt out of the grading program and to delete all the voice recordings that Apple has stored on its servers. Users were given the choice of whether their audio data was received by Apple or not, with the ability to change their decision as often as they like. It was then made an opt-in program.

In May 2020, Thomas le Bonniec revealed himself as the whistleblower and sent a letter to European data protection regulators, calling on them to investigate Apple's "past and present" use of Siri recordings. He argued that, even though Apple has apologized, it has never faced the consequences for its years-long grading program.

In December 2024, Apple agreed to a $95 million class-action settlement, compensating users of Siri-enabled from the past ten years. Additionally, Apple must confirm the deletion of Siri recordings before 2019 (when the feature became opt-in) and issue new guidance on how data is collected and how users can participate in efforts to improve Siri.

== Social impacts and awareness ==
=== Disability ===
Apple has introduced various accessibility features aimed at making its devices more inclusive for individuals with disabilities. The company provides users the opportunity to share feedback on accessibility features through email. Some of the new functionalities include live speech, personal voice, Siri's atypical speech pattern recognition, and much more.

Accessibility features:

- VoiceOver: This feature provides visual feedback for Siri responses, allowing users to engage with Siri through both visual and auditory channels.
- Voice-to-text and text-to-voice: Siri can transcribe spoken words into and text as well as read text typed by the user out loud.
- Text commands: Users can type what they want Siri to do.
- Personal voice: This allows users to create a synthesized voice that sounds like them.

=== Bias ===
Siri, like many AI systems, can perpetuate gender and racial biases through its design and functionality. As argued by The Conversation, Siri "reinforces the role of women as secondary and submissive to men" due to the fact that the default is a soft, female voice. According to an article from The Scientific American, Claudia Lloreda explains that non-native English speakers have to "adapt our way of speaking to interact with speech-recognition technologies". Furthermore, due to repetitive "learnings" from a larger user base, Siri may unintentionally produce a Western perspective, limiting representation and furthering biases in everyday interactions. Despite these perpetuated issues, Siri does provide several benefits as well, especially for those with disabilities that typically limit their abilities to use technology and access the internet. Apple has since introduced a larger variety of voices with different accents and languages.

== Swearing ==
The iOS version of Siri ships with a vulgar content filter; however, it is disabled by default and must be enabled by the user manually.

In 2018, Ars Technica reported a glitch that could be exploited by a user requesting the definition of "mother" be read out loud. Siri would issue a response and ask the user if they would like to hear the next definition; when the user replies with "yes", Siri would mention "mother" as being short for "motherfucker". This resulted in multiple YouTube videos featuring the responses or how to trigger them, or both. Apple fixed the issue silently. The content is picked up from third-party sources such as the Oxford English Dictionary and not a supplied message from the corporation.

== In popular culture ==
Siri provided the voice of 'Puter in The Lego Batman Movie.

== See also ==
- List of speech recognition software
- Amazon Alexa
- ChatGPT
