= Helgi Magnús Gunnarsson =

Icelandic lawyer

- Born: 4 December 1964 (age 61); Þingeyri, Iceland
- Education: University of Iceland
- Occupation: Deputy Director of Public Prosecutions in Iceland

Helgi Magnús Gunnarsson (born 4 December 1964) is an Icelandic lawyer and former Deputy Director of Public Prosecutions in Iceland.

== Early life and education ==
Helgi was born in Þingeyri, Iceland, where he lived until he turned 18-years old. He began his schooling at the elementary school in Þingeyri, and was later at Núpur in Dýrafjörður. He then studied carpentry at the Fjölbrautaskólinn í Breiðholti (FB) and finished his exams in 1984.

In 1987, he completed his studies at the Master Carpentry School and in the spring of 1993 he completed his Stúdentspróf at evening school from FB. He later studied law at the University of Iceland and completed his studies at the beginning of 1999. He also studied at the Police University in Oslo in from 2005 to 2006 in the investigation and prosecution of economic crimes.

== Career ==
After completing his studies, Helgi worked at the Economic Crimes Department of the Icelandic Police as a legal representative from 1998-2005. He was appointed a prosecutor at the Office of the State Prosecutor in 2005-2006, and at the beginning of 2007, a prosecutor of economic crimes at the Office of the National Commissioner of the Police, where he headed the Economic Crimes Department until October 2010. Then he was elected by Alþingi deputy prosecutor regarding the handling of the case of Alþingi against Geir H. Haarde before the National Court. In August 2011, he was appointed Deputy Director of Public Prosecutions in Iceland.

== Controversies ==
Helgi has caused several controversies with his comments over the years. In 2011, he was criticised after allegedly making inappropriate comments about Alda Hrönn Jóhannsdóttir, the appointed prosecutor of the Economic Crimes Department, including calling her Kerlingar tussa, in the audience of the department's employees.

In 2019, he was criticised for several comments on immigrants and abortion.

In September 2021, Helgi was criticised after liking a comment on Facebook that stated that Stígamót, a centre for survivors of sexual violence in Iceland, and an accuser in the 2021 Football Association of Iceland scandal where guilty of blackmail.

Following his Facebook post regarding the case of a gay immigrant in July 2022, Baldur Þórhallsson, professor of political science at the University of Iceland, stated that years of several controversial comments of Helgi undermined the public's trust in the state prosecutor's office, the courts and the public sector. He was later officially reprimanded for his comments by the Director of Public Prosecutions, Sigríður J. Friðjónsdóttir.
