= Björkegren =

Björkegren is a Swedish surname. Notable people with the surname include:

- Carl-Eric Björkegren (born 1920), Swedish director, art collector, and businessman
- Kim Björkegren (born 1981), Swedish football manager
- Olga Björkegren (1857–1950), Swedish opera singer
- Sigrid Björkegren (1845–1936), Swedish shipowner
