= Primeau =

Primeau is a surname of French origin meaning prime or first or cousin. Variations include Primeaux, Primo, Premo, Promo. The name refers to:

- Cayden Primeau (born 1999), American professional ice hockey player, son of Keith Primeau
- Ernest John Primeau (1909–1989), American Roman Catholic prelate and former Bishop of Manchester
- Edward John Primeau (born 1958), American audio/video forensics expert
- Gaëtan Primeau (born 1941), Canadian politician
- Joe Primeau (1906–1989), Canadian professional ice hockey player
- Jo Primeau, Canadian drag queen
- Keith Primeau (born 1971), Canadian professional ice hockey player, father of Cayden Primeau
- Kevin Primeau (born 1955), Canadian professional ice hockey player
- Louis Primeau (fl. 1749–1800), Canadian fur trader
- Victor Primeau (born 2003), Canadian freestyle skier
- Wayne Primeau (born 1976), Canadian professional ice hockey player

== See also ==
- Verdell Primeaux, Native American singer and songwriter
