= Metronome (Nottingham) =

Venue in Nottingham, England

- Location: Nottingham, England
- Owner: Nottingham Trent University
- Capacity: 400
- Type: Music and live events venue

Construction
- Opened: October 2018

Website
- metronome.uk.com

Metronome is a music and live events venue in Nottingham, England. Opened in October 2018, it operates as both a public performance venue and an educational facility for students at Nottingham Trent University (NTU). The venue hosts a diverse programme of live music, comedy, spoken word, and cross-media events, alongside rehearsals, recording, and broadcast activity.

== History ==
Metronome opened its doors in October 2018 with the aim of offering Nottingham new opportunities to experience live music and performance, ranging from intimate seated events to sold-out gigs.

Since opening, Metronome has become the home of BBC Introducing in the East Midlands and Just the Tonic Comedy Club. The venue has also hosted stages as part of festivals including Dot to Dot and Hockley Hustle, as well as regular Rough Trade out-store events.

== Venue and facilities ==
Metronome was designed as a purpose-built space for sound, performance, and live production by audio architects White Mark Ltd. It has been described as an educational centre of European significance.

The venue includes:

- A 400-capacity live performance space (228 seated)
- 20 professional rehearsal studios
- 10 recording studios and edit labs
- A surround sound and post-production studio
- A critical listening seminar room
- Live events production and technical rehearsal spaces
- A synthesiser laboratory for sound design and experimentation

== Educational role ==
By day, Metronome functions as a learning environment for NTU students studying music and live events. Teaching takes place within active performance and production spaces, providing hands-on experience in sound, lighting, staging, and event delivery.

By night, Metronome operates as a fully commercial venue, hosting national and international performers, comedy events, and BBC Introducing showcases. This dual role enables students to learn within the same environments used by professional artists, technicians, and promoters.

== Programme and events ==
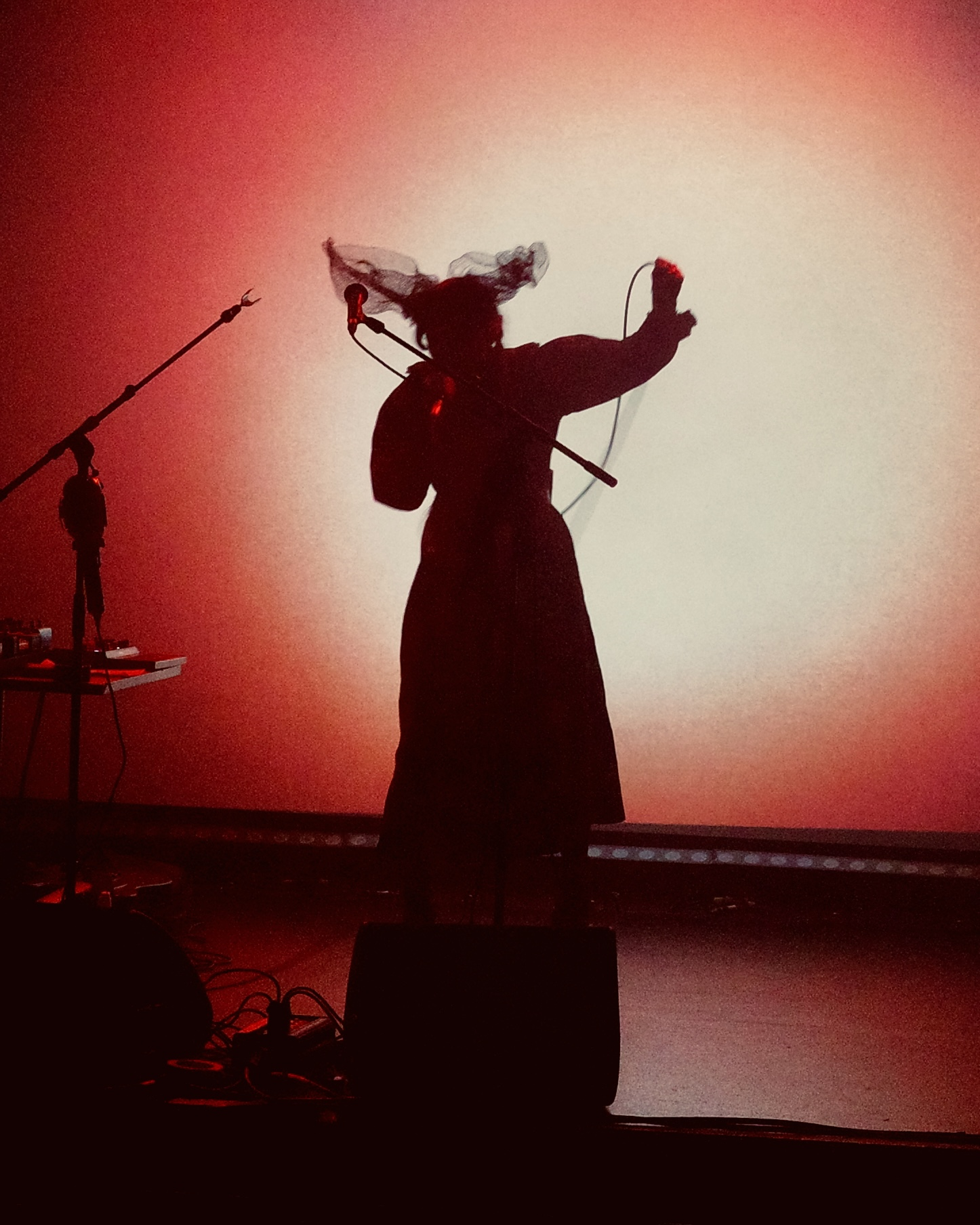
Penelope Trappes performing at Metronome

Metronome presents an ambitious and diverse programme spanning music, comedy, spoken word, moving image, video games, and live performance.

Artists who have performed at the venue include Self Esteem, Sigrid, Twin Atlantic, Circa Waves, Bru-C, Snapped Ankles, Elvis Costello, Frank Turner, Badly Drawn Boy, The Orb, Kosheen, and Warpaint.

Comedians who have appeared at Metronome include Russell Howard, Romesh Ranganathan, Ed Byrne, Reginald D. Hunter, Naomi Cooper, Scott Bennett, Jason Byrne, and Lindsey Santoro.

The venue has also hosted events such as the British Esports Finals, Nottingham Poetry Festival, burlesque performances, and book launches.

== Reputation ==
Metronome has developed a strong reputation within Nottingham and across the UK for its contemporary and cross-media programming. It has been described as a national centre for music, live performance, spoken word, and digital culture, with a focus on discovery and emerging talent.
