= Siiri =

Female given name

- Gender: Female
- Language: Estonian, Finnish
- Name day: 19 June (both Estonia and Finland)

Origin
- Region of origin: Estonia, Finland

Other names
- Derived: from the Old Norse name Sigríðr, derived from sigr (“victory”) + fríðr (“beautiful”)
- Related names: Sigrid, Siri

Siiri is an Estonian and Finnish feminine given name derived from the Old Norse name Sigríðr. It is a cognate of the modern Scandinavian name Sigrid.

People named Siiri include:

- Siiri Angerkoski (1902–1971), Finnish actress
- Siiri Oviir (born 1947), Estonian politician
- Siiri Nordin (born 1980), Finnish singer
- Siiri Rantanen (1924–2023), Finnish cross-country skier
- Siiri Sisask (born 1968), Estonian singer, actress and politician
- Siiri Välimaa (born 1990), Finnish footballer
- Siiri Vallner (born 1972), Estonian architect
- Siiri Yrjölä (born 2004), Finish ice hockey player
