= Ingibjörg Skaptadóttir =

Icelandic editor and publisher

Ingibjörg Skaptadóttir (1867 – 1945) was an Icelandic editor and publisher.

She founded, managed and published the monthly women's magazine Framsókn, in collaboration with her mother Sigríður Þorsteinsdóttir, between 1895 and 1899. The first women's magazine in Iceland, it placed focus on women's access to education and encouraged women them to demand and use their rights. She belonged to the first female editors, publishers and journalists in Iceland. She retired in 1899 and left her magazine to Jarþrúður Jónsdóttir and Ólafía Jóhannsdóttir.
