= Jarþrúður Jónsdóttir =

Icelandic editor and publisher

Jarþrúður Jónsdóttir (1851 – 1924) was an Icelandic editor and publisher.

She was born to an Icelandic judge. She was educated in Denmark. On her return to Iceland, she was employed as a teacher at the first school for girls in Iceland, the Reykjavik Women's Gymnasium.

In 1889, she was employed at the archive of the Althing and as such become the first woman to be employed there.

In 1899, she took over the pioneering Icelandic feminist women's magazine Framsókn from Sigríður Þorsteinsdóttir and Ingibjörg Skaptadóttir, and managed it in collaboration with Ólafía Jóhannsdóttir.
