= Siri (given name) =

- Gender: Female

Origin
- Meaning: Beautiful victory

Other names
- Related names: Sigrid, Siiri

Siri is a Scandinavian feminine given name. It is a short form of Sigrid, from Old Norse Sigríðr, composed of the elements sigr "victory" and fríðr "beautiful". The variant Siri has been widely used since the Middle Ages, it was common in Norway until the 18th century, when its usage declined, but saw new high popularity in the 20th century. It is now a common name in Norway and Sweden. In Sweden, the name gained new popularity around 1900, and has again become increasingly popular in the last years.

The Faroese equivalent is Sirið; the ð is not pronounced; the spelling without ð is also common.

To a lesser extent, it is also used in Denmark.

Siri, the virtual assistant created by Adam Cheyer and Dag Kittlaus in 2007, and acquired by Apple Inc. in 2010, derives its name from the Scandinavian name Siri, inspired by creator Dag Kittlaus's Norwegian heritage.

Siri is also an unrelated Indian feminine given name. It is a Telugu and Kannada word, meaning wealth or fortune. It is a popular given name in Andhra Pradesh, Telangana and Karnataka.

Siri is also a Thai neutral given name. It is a cognate with the Indian name and has the same meaning.

In Swahili, a language spoken in much of East and Central Africa, siri means secret.

== People ==
- Siri Andersson-Palmestav (1903–2002), Swedish writer and missionary
- Siri Andrahennady (born 1946), Sri Lankan politician
- Siri Hall Arnøy (born 1978), Norwegian politician
- Siri Aurdal (1937–2026), Norwegian painter
- Siri Austeng (1944–2017), Norwegian politician
- Siri Berg (1921–2020), American abstract artist
- Siri Bjerke (1958–2012), Norwegian politician
- Siri Arun Budcharern (born 2002), Laotian swimmer
- Siri Carpenter (born 1971), American freelance science journalist
- Siri Dahl (born 1987/1988), American pornographic film actress
- Siri Derkert (1888–1973), Swedish artist and sculptor
- Siri Dokken (born 1966), Norwegian illustrator
- Siri Eftedal (born 1966), Norwegian handball player
- Siri Hov Eggen (born 1969), Norwegian politician
- Siri Engberg (born 1967), American writer, curator, editor
- Siri Engesæth (born 1969), Norwegian politician
- Siri von Essen (1850–1912), Finland-Swedish actress
- Siri Gellein (born 1966), Norwegian vocalist and journalist
- Siri Gjære (born 1972), Norwegian jazz vocalist
- Siri Gloppen (born 1964), Norwegian political scientist
- Siri Nordeide Grønli (born 1984), Norwegian footballer
- Siri Gunasinghe (1925–2017), Sri Lankan poet and historian
- Siri Hangeland (born 1952), Norwegian politician
- Siri Hatlen (born 1957), Norwegian businessperson
- Siri Hustvedt (born 1955), American novelist, essayist, poet
- Siri Naga I, King of Anuradhapura from 196 to 215
- Siri Sangha Bodhi I, King of Anuradhapura from 252 to 254
- Siri Naga II, King of Anuradhapura from 245 to 247
- Linn Siri Jensen (born 1961), Norwegian team handball goalkeeper and coach
- Siri Broch Johansen (born 1967), Sámi author and language worker
- Siri Jørgensdatter (born 1717), Norwegian peasant girl prosecuted for witchcraft
- Siri Kalvig (born 1970), Norwegian meteorologist
- Siri Kannangara (1944–2024), Australian sports medical doctor
- Siri Kaur (born 1976), American artist
- Siri Keul (born 1948), Norwegian handball player
- Siri Kolu (born 1972), Finnish author and playwright
- Siri Kanth Korla (1917–2007), Indian Army Major General
- Siri Landsem (born 1965), Norwegian sport shooter
- Siri Lee (born 1989), Taiwanese singer-songwriter
- Siri Lehland (born 2001), Norwegian model
- Siri Leknes (born 2000), Norwegian neuroscientist
- Siri Lindley (born 1968 or 1969), American triathlon coach
- Siri Sverdrup Lunden (1920–2003), Norwegian teacher
- Siri A. Meling (born 1963), Norwegian politician
- Siri Minge (born 1994), Norwegian cyclist
- Siri Minken (born 1980), Norwegian former motorcycle rider
- Siri Mullinix (born 1978), American soccer player and coach
- Siri Myrvoll (1944–2012), Norwegian politician
- Siri Neal (born 1972), British actress
- Siri Nergaard (born 1962), Norwegian translation scholar
- Siri Nilsen (born 1985), Norwegian singer
- Siri Nordby (born 1978), Norwegian footballer
- Siri Perera (1910–1995), Buddhist
- Siri Pettersen (born 1971), Norwegian writer and fantasy author
- Siri Chand Ram (born 1958), Indian racewalker
- Siri Rathsman (1895–1974), Swedish surrealist artist
- Siri Ravikumar (born 1997), Indian actress
- Siri von Reis (1931–2021), American botanist, author and poet
- Si Rijigawa (born 1986), Chinese judoka
- Siri Røine (born 1957), Norwegian civil servant
- Siri Rom (1918–2002), Norwegian actress
- Siri Sande (born 1943), Norwegian archaeologist and professor
- Siri Schnéevoigt (1870–1946), Danish photographer and actress
- Siri Seglem (born 1983), Norwegian handball player
- Siri Skare (1958–2011), Norwegian aviator
- Siri Staalesen (born 1973), Norwegian politician
- Siri Frost Sterri (1944–2023), Norwegian politician
- Siri Sunde (born 1958), Norwegian priest
- Siri Svegler (born 1980), Swedish actress
- Siri Thoresen (born 1962), Norwegian psychologist
- Siri Thornhill (born 1966), Norwegian classical soprano
- Siri Tollerød (born 1987), Norwegian model
- Siri Tuttle, American linguist
- Siri Ulvestad (born 1988), Norwegian orienteer
- Siri Wålberg (born 1980), Norwegian musical artist performing as Sissy Wish
- Siri Wigger (born 2003), Swiss cross-country skier
- Siri Worm (born 1992), Dutch footballer

== Others ==
- Siri, a virtual assistant created by Apple Inc.
- Sergeant Siri, a character in The Forever War by Joe Haldeman
- Siri Keeton, the narrator and protagonist of Peter Watts's Blindsight
- Siri, a character in Hyperion by Dan Simmons
