= Middle name =

Additional portion of a personal name

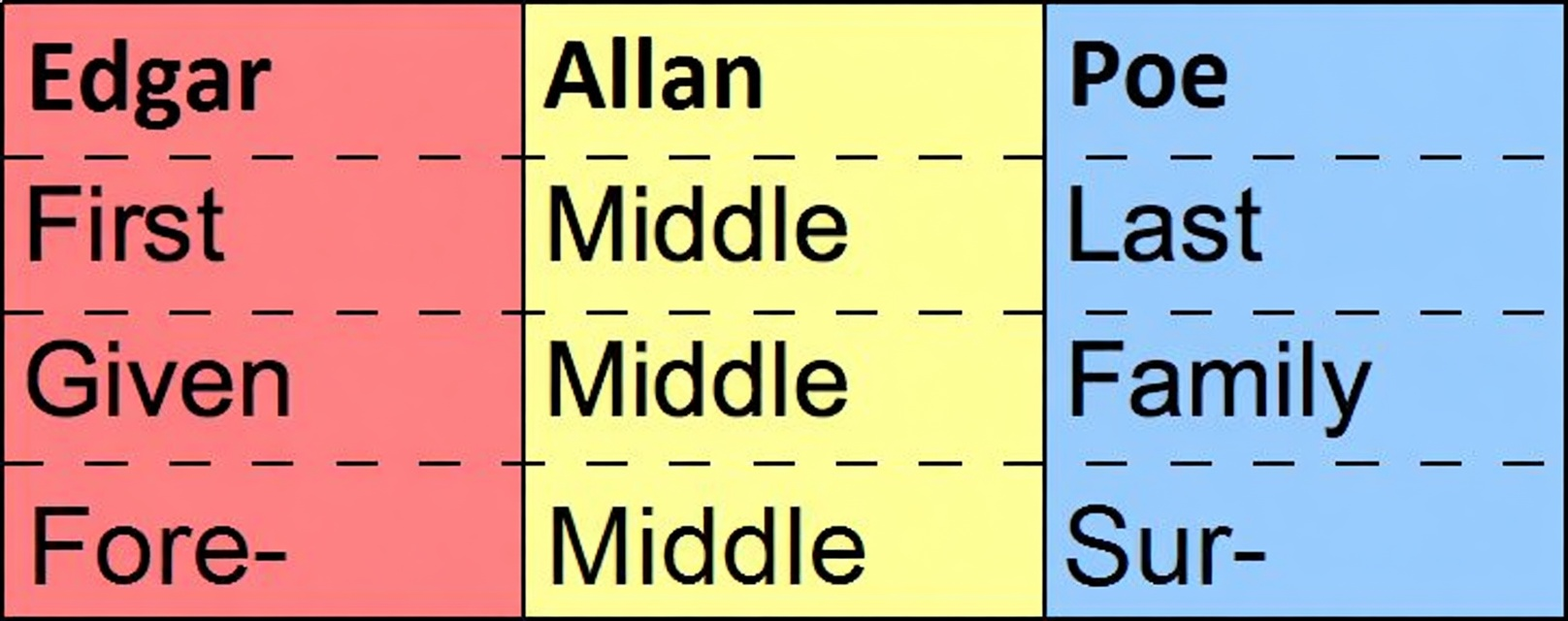
First/forename, middle name, and last/family/surname using the example of Edgar Allan Poe. This Western naming order is typical for English-speaking cultures (and some others).

A middle name is a component of a personal name that in Western naming order is written between a person's forename and surname. Together, the fore- and middle names form a person's given names. Usage of middle names varies between different cultural and linguistic groups. The origins of middle names can be traced to Roman times, and the use of middle names re-emerged in Italy in the 13th century.

== Origins ==
In ancient Rome, aristocratic male Romans used a naming system called tria nomina, which included three distinct parts to the name: a praenomen (personal name), nomen (family name), and cognomen (A personal nickname describing a physical trait, personality, or family branch, but later became hereditary from father to son). As the nomen was placed in the middle, it had a different usage compared to how middle names are used now.

The use of middle names re-emerged in Italy in the 13th century and by the late 1400s, it was common for upper-class families in Italy to use middle names, with this later spreading to other social classes. This trend caught on across Europe, particularly for people from wealthy families. In Germany, middle names had become commonly used by the 17th century, with German immigrants being noted as bringing this custom to North America. In the first decade of the 19th century in France most boys did not have a middle name, but by the last decade of the century 46% of boys had one middle name and 23% of boys had two middle names.

It was also during the 19th century that Americans of European descent started to more commonly use middle names, whilst in Britain middle names started to be used more frequently by the middle classes, who took this trend from the nobility. By the early 20th century, birth records show that in North Carolina, most children had a middle name, as did their parents. By the advent of the First World War, the first government documents in the United States that requested a middle name were official enlistment forms.

== Usage ==
Usage of middle names varies widely between different cultural and linguistic groups. A person may have one, multiple, or no middle names. People with middle names are often not called by them except in official or formal contexts, or when it is necessary to distinguish them from other people with the same forename and surname. Alternately, some people prefer to identify themselves primarily by a middle name rather than their forename.

Middle names are not the only words that can occur between the forename and surname. Sometimes other words occurring in this position may be treated as akin to middle names, even though they are not given names. Examples include patronyms (as in East Slavic names), or a secondary family name (often a matrilineal or maiden name) which precedes the primary surname (as in Filipino names). However, many other words that occur in the middle of personal names are entirely distinct from middle names, such as:

- multiple surnames where the primary family name precedes the secondary one (as in Spanish names)
- compound surnames, known as double-barrelled names, where both family names are equal
- compound forenames, known as a double name, which form an inseparable unit always spoken together
- separate particles prefixing a surname (such as the Dutch tussenvoegsels van or de).

== Regional variances ==
=== Anglosphere ===
In countries that primarily speak English—such as Australia, Canada, Ireland, New Zealand, the United Kingdom, and the United States—the forename of a relative is sometimes used as one's middle name to honor familial heritage. In many cases in the United States, however, a person's middle name does not derive from relatives, but is used instead to honor close family friends or notable public figures.

In the United States, the middle name is often abbreviated to the middle initial. This first became popular in the 19th century. Examples of famous people who abbreviated their middle names include John D. Rockefeller, Dwight D. Eisenhower, and Booker T. Washington. In the 21st century, widespread use of middle initials in the United States is in decline, although they are still commonly used in intellectual fields, where studies show that middle initials are associated with knowledgeability and authoritativeness.

The abbreviations "N.M.N." (no middle name) and "N.M.I." (no middle initial) are sometimes used in formal documents in the United States, where a middle initial or name is expected but the person does not have one. Sometimes middle initials have been used to make a person's name more distinct. Screenwriter David X. Cohen was born David Samuel Cohen, but adopted the middle initial "X" when he joined the Writers Guild of America, as there was already a member named David S. Cohen, and the union forbade multiple writers from using the same name.

A rare case of an individual being given only an initial as a middle name, with the initial not explicitly standing for anything, was Harry S. Truman. Other people with single-letter middle names include Robert B. Hollander Jr. and Mark M Davis. Jennifer 8. Lee, an American author, was not given a middle name at birth so she chose "8" when she was a teenager, in recognition of her Chinese ancestry because the number eight symbolizes prosperity and good luck.

More than two given middle names is fairly common. In Britain, the use of two middle names is traditionally more common among the upper and middle classes such as David William Donald Cameron.

=== China and Korea ===
Most Chinese and Korean names are sharing a structure of "3-character name" such as Xi Jinping (习近平) or Lee Jae-myung (이재명), with surname is monosyllable Xi (习) or Lee (이) and given name consist of two monosyllables Jinping (近平) or Jae-myung (재명). In their naming system, the first syllable of given name such as Jin (近) or Jae (재) is considered part of the "first name" rather than a separate "middle name". Therefore, when someone is addressed "on a first-name basis", the entire given name is used rather than just one syllable.

Later in life, some Chinese people (most in Hong Kong, Singapore, Malaysia) anglicise or change their names, sometimes including middle names. For example, Ip Man (葉問) was born as Ip Kai Man (葉繼問), and he later omitted his "middle name" Kai (繼).

=== Japan ===
Historically, some Japanese people used the particle no (by kana の/ノ or by kanji 之) between the surname and given name to indicate possession (somewhat analogous to English of, French de, or German von), such as Minamoto no Yoshitsune or Saitō no Musashibō Benkei. Although no was usually omitted in kanji form (e.g. in the case of Minamoto no Yoshitsune, it is written as 源義経 officially; if each part is read individually, 源 is read as Minamoto, and 義経 is read as Yoshitsune), but no was official in reading the full name. In the case of Benkei, Musashibō could be interpreted as a middle name.

Over time however, usage of both the no particle and middle names in general have become increasingly uncommon, and Japanese people generally no longer use either nowadays. Middle names still occur among some Hāfu, who could be given one from foreign languages, such as Fujita Joel Chima or Kokubo Leo Brian, and are usually written in katakana or ateji.

=== India ===
Traditional names in India vary regionally due to its ethnic and religious diversity. Modern Hindu names across India use a first name, which is usually a word in Sanskrit or an indigenous Indian language, a middle name (in rare instances), which is usually the name of a child's father or spouse, followed by a surname which is usually the caste that the person's family belongs to, taken from the father or husband. Middle and last names from the traditionally matrilineal Nair community in Kerala were historically based on the mother's family. Among Kerala's Saint Thomas Christians, the naming conventions has seen change with every generation. The surname would be the family name and the middle name used to be the name of the father or spouse(for married women), and the personal name used to be that of a grandparent or parent. The first son would have the father's father's name and the second son the mother's mother's. The first daughter would have the father's mother's and the second daughter the mother's father's. The third son would be named after the father and the third daughter after the mother, thus resulting in double names such as Thomas Thomas or Joseph Jospeh. In newer generations people began using unique and distinctive personal names thus moving the Grandparent's name to the middle name.

Among the Sikhs of India, many have adopted the middle name Singh or Kaur which means lion and princess respectively. This is sometimes followed by their Punjabi caste surname. Among Indian Muslims, similar naming conventions to Hindus and Sikhs are followed, but the names are usually in Arabic, Persian or Urdu.

=== Philippines ===
Middle names mostly use the mother's maiden surname, inserted between the given name and the surname (father's surname) and are almost always abbreviated, signifying that it is a "middle name".

=== Russia ===
Both girls and boys are typically given a middle name based on their father's forename. For girls, often ovna or evna is added to the end, whereas for boys ovich or evich is sometimes added to the end.

=== Scandinavia ===
The naming conventions of Scandinavian countries do not call given names middle names. While extra first names often are referred to as middle names in everyday language, laws do not reflect that and consider all of them first names. A person can have multiple first names, but usually, only one of them is used to address the person. A passport contains all names, but all except the surname are listed as first/given names. Names combined with a hyphen are counted as one name. A person named "Ulrika Britt-Inger Marie Fredriksson" has three first names and one last name, and this individual could choose to go by any of those three first names.

In Denmark and Norway, the legal term middle name refers most often to names that were originally surnames, but not part of the last name of the name bearer. A middle name could be a person's mother's maiden name or the last name of another recent ancestor (for instance a grandparent). In Sweden, however, although middle names were introduced in the Name Act of 1963, they were later called tilläggsnamn (added name), and then mellannamn (middle name) in the Name Act of 1983. The name act of 2017 removed the concept entirely. Existing last-name middle names may still be used, but can no longer be given.

=== Vietnam ===
Most Vietnamese names (e.g. Nguyễn Thị Bình) share a structure similar to that of Chinese and Korean names, typically consisting of a three-syllable name with a monosyllabic surname (Nguyễn) and a given name consisting of two monosyllables (Thị Bình). However, because the most common form of address is by last syllable (Bình) of the given name, it is usually divided into two sub-components: "padding name" (Thị) and "primary name" (Bình).

The component that appears in the "middle" of a Vietnamese personal name is not properly called a "middle name" (tên giữa) but rather a "padding name" (tên đệm) or "padding character" (chữ đệm), and it is optional. The padding name differs from the Western middle name in both function and usage: it cannot be used independently, must preced and be used together with the primary name (most is last syllable of given name) when addressing a person. For this reason, Vietnamese people do not have middle names in the English sense. The padding name is generally regarded as an optional component of a "first name" such as "Thị Bình Nguyễn", rather than a separate "middle name" such as "Bình Thị Nguyễn" when formating in Western order of "first name–middle name–last name".

Thị (氏, lit. 'of the clan') is a traditional padding name for female, and masculine equivalent is Văn (文, lit. 'refined, cultured'). However, both of them have fallen out of favor among modern Vietnamese people and gradually replaced by others.

=== Iceland ===
It is possible for an Icelandic person to have more than one given name (eiginnöfn "own name"), but there also exists a separate category of legal names called millinöfn ("middle name").

== See also ==
- Personal name
- Given name
- Roman naming conventions
