= Sigrid =

Name list

- Gender: Female

Origin
- Language: Old Norse
- Meaning: "Victory" and "Beautiful"
- Region of origin: Scandinavia

Other names
- Alternative spelling: Siri
- Variant form: Siiri
- Short form: Sig
- Nickname: Sigge
- Pet name: Sigi
- Related names: Zigrīda

Sigrid /ˈsiːɡrɪd/ is a Scandinavian given name for women from Old Norse Sigríðr, composed of the elements sigr "victory" and fríðr "beautiful". Common short forms include Siri, Sigga, Sig, and Sigi. An Estonian and Finnish variant is Siiri. The Latvian version of the name is Zigrīda.

== People ==
- Sigrid (singer), Norwegian singer
- Princess Sigrid of Sweden, Swedish princess
- Sigrid Aas (born 1980), Norwegian cross-country skier
- Sigrid Alegría, Chilean actress
- Sigrid Alexandersen (born 1995), Norwegian orienteer
- Sigrid Agren, French fashion model
- Sigrid Banér, Swedish letter writer
- Sigrid Andrea Bernardo, Filipino screenwriter and director
- Sigrid Björkegren (1845–1936), Swedish entrepreneur
- Sigrid Borge (born 1995), Norwegian javelin thrower
- Sigrid Brahe, Swedish countess
- Sigrid Elmblad (1860–1926), Swedish journalist and poet
- Sigrid Eskilsdotter (Banér), Swedish noble
- Sigrid Fick, Swedish tennis player
- Sigrid af Forselles (1860–1935), Finnish sculptor
- Sigrid Fronius (born 1942), German author, journalist and feminist
- Sigrid Fry-Revere, American bioethicist
- Sigrid Grajek (born 1963), German actor and cabaret actress
- Sigrid Augusta Green (1920–2012), British code breaker, Norwegian resistance member
- Sigrid Gurie, Norwegian-American actress
- Sigrid Brattabø Handegard (born 1963), Norwegian politician
- Sigrid the Haughty, Swedish, possibly Slavic, queen of Sweden, Denmark, and England
- Sigrid Helliesen Lund (1892–1987), Norwegian peace activist
- Sigrid Hjertén, Swedish painter
- Sigrid Hjørnegård (born 1965), Norwegian politician
- Sigrid Holmquist, Swedish actress
- Sigrid Holmwood, British artist
- Sigrid Hunke, German author
- Sigrid Huun (born 1952), Norwegian actress
- Sigrid Kaag, Dutch diplomat and politician
- Sigrid Kirchmann, Austrian high jumper
- Sigrid Kruse (1867–1950), Swedish educator, children's writer and suffragist
- Sigrid Lidströmer, Swedish novelist
- Sigrid Lotfi (1921–2014), German-born Iranian translator
- Sigrid Moldestad (born 1972), Norwegian folk singer and musician
- Sigrid Nunez (born 1951), American novelist and essayist
- Sigrid D. Peyerimhoff, German chemist
- Sigrid Schmidt (born 1930), German ethnologist and folklorist
- Sigrid Schultz, American war correspondent
- Sigrid Sepp, Estonian swimmer
- Sigrid Sparre, Swedish lady-in-waiting
- Sigrid Stray (1893–1978), Norwegian barrister and women's rights proponent
- Sigrid Sture, Swedish governor
- Sigrid Thornton, Australian actress
- Sigrid Torsk (1841–1924), Swedish jewellery designer
- Sigrid Bonde Tusvik (born 1980), Norwegian television presenter and entertainer
- Sigrid Undset (1882–1949), Norwegian novelist and Nobel Prize winner
- Sigrid Valdis, American actress
- Sigrid Wille, German skier
- Sigrid Wolf, Austrian skier

== Other meanings ==
- 1493 Sigrid, an asteroid
- Storm Sigrid, in Britain and Ireland in November 2024

== See also ==
- Sigríður
- Sigurd
