= Icelandic middle names =

Icelandic middle names (millinafn) are a specific category of personal names that are legally approved on Iceland as part of a citizen's name. The middle name is situated between one or more forenames (or "given names") and one or more surnames (parentonymics or family names). Unlike forenames and surnames middle names are optional, lack a nominative case, almost always unisex, and a person can only use one middle name. A middle name is legally distinct from a second forename and a traditional forename is not allowed to be used as a middle name. If someone has a middle name they can only use two forenames/given names as a person is allowed maximum three "proper names". Icelandic middle names are often etymologically or topically similar to names that are family names in the Scandinavian countries.

== History ==
The middle name category was introduced in 1996 to try to encourage those in Iceland who use family names instead of parentonymics to transition to parentonymics as their primary surname. The idea being that those who use family names can continue to use those names as middle names occasionally within the family without them being exclusively family names which every family member wears and identifies by. Use of family names in Iceland is very rare but the Icelandic government has put effort into promoting consistency in naming conventions, wishing for all citizens to have at least one parentonymic as a surname (conventionally a patronymic). Despite this many middle names are original and not derived from historical family names.

New middle names must be approved by the Icelandic Naming Committee before being accepted on a legal form. A proposed middle name must be a word that has an Icelandic linguistic root or has had a long established history on Iceland.

As Icelandic given names are strictly controlled by laws and regulations and many persons share the same first name people have in later years began to choose middle names to help differentiate themselves or their children if they have a common first name. As Icelanders rarely use parentonymics when referring to themselves or others, people being primarily known by their given name, middle names sometimes become used similar to a part of a compound name if there is need to distinguish between two or more people with the same first name.

== List of approved middle names ==
=== A ===
- Aðaldal
- Aðdal
- Aldan
- Arnberg
- Arnfjörð
- Austan
- Austdal
- Austfjörð

=== Á ===
- Árheim
- Árland
- Ármúla
- Áss

=== B ===
- Bakkdal
- Bakkmann
- Bald
- Baróns
- Bárðdal
- Ben
- Berg
- Bergholt
- Bergland
- Bergset
- Best
- Bíldsfells
- Bjarg
- Bjarndal
- Bjarnfjörð
- Bláfeld
- Blómkvist
- Borgdal
- Brekkmann
- Brim
- Brúnsteð

=== D ===
- Dalhoff
- Dalland
- Dan
- Diljan
- Draumland

=== E ===
- Ektavon
- Eldberg
- Eldborg
- Elísberg
- Elvan
- Eskfjörð
- Espólín
- Eyfjörð
- Eyhlíð
- Eyland
- Eyrfeld
- Eyvík

=== F ===
- Falk
- Finndal
- Fjallmann
- Fossberg
- Freydal
- Friðhólm
- Fríðhólm
- Frostberg

=== G ===
- Giljan
- Gilsfjörð
- Gletting
- Gnarr
- Gnurr
- Goðdal
- Grendal
- Grindvík
- Grjótgarð
- Gull

=== H ===
- Haffjörð
- Hafnes
- Hafnfjörð
- Hagg
- Har
- Heimdal
- Heimsberg
- Helgfell
- Herberg
- Heydal
- Hildiberg
- Hjaltdal
- Hlíðbekk
- Hlíðberg
- Hlíðkvist
- Hnappdal
- Hnífsdal
- Hofland
- Hofteig
- Hornfjörð
- Hólmberg
- Hrafnan
- Hrafnar
- Hrafndal
- Hrafnfjörð
- Hraunberg
- Hreinberg
- Hreindal

=== Í ===
- Íshólm
- Ísjak

=== J ===
- Joð
- Jórvík
- Júl

=== K ===
- Kaldakvísl
- Kaldbak
- Kalddal
- Ká
- Kelddal
- Kjarrval
- Kling
- Knaran
- Knarran
- Konn
- Kreml
- Krossá
- Krossdal
- Kvikan
- Kvist

=== L ===
- Laufkvist
- Laufland
- Laugdal
- Laxfoss
- Lár
- Liljan
- Lindberg
- Linddal
- Listó
- Línberg
- Ljónshjarta
- Ljós
- Loðmfjörð
- Logn
- Lyngberg

=== M ===
- Magdal
- Magg
- Maí
- Matt
- Miðdal
- Miðvík
- Mjófjörð
- Mordal
- Móberg
- Mýrmann

=== N ===
- Nesmann
- Nikk
- Norðland
- Núpdal

=== O ===
- Ordal

=== Ó ===
- Óldal
- Ólfjörð
- Ósland
- Ósmann

=== R ===
- Reginbald
- Reyðfjörð
- Reykfell
- Reykfjörð
- Reynholt
- Rokk

=== S ===
- Salberg
- Sandhólm
- Seljan
- Sig
- Sigurhólm
- Skaftfeld
- Skagalín
- Skipstað
- Skíðdal
- Skjöld
- Snæberg
- Snædahl
- Snæfellsjökuls
- Sólan
- Stardal
- Starr
- Stein
- Steinbekk
- Steinberg
- Steinhólm
- Storm
- Straumberg
- Svanhild
- Svarfdal

=== U ===
- Unn

=== Ú ===
- Úlfberg
- Úlfdal
- Úlfstað

=== V ===
- Val
- Valagils
- Vald
- Varmdal
- Vatneyr
- Vatnsfjörð
- Vattar
- Vattarnes
- Vattnes
- Vest
- Viðfjörð
- Villiljós
- Vídalín
- Víking
- Vopnfjörð

=== Y ===
- Yngling

=== Þ ===
- Þor
- Þorskfjörð

=== Ö ===
- Önfjörð
- Örbekk
- Öxdal
- Öxndal
