= Þorbjörg Sveinsdóttir =

Icelandic midwife and feminist

Þorbjörg Sveinsdóttir (1827 – 1903) was an Icelandic midwife and feminist, particularly known for her work for women's right to education.

She was born in Iceland to an Icelandic priest. She educated herself as a midwife in Copenhagen in Denmark in 1855–1856, and then returned to Iceland, where she worked as a midwife in Reykjavík until 1902. As such she took many midwife students. She never married, but became the foster mother of her orphaned niece, the writer and feminist Ólafía Jóhannsdóttir.

She was active in the work to establish a university in Iceland. In 1894, she founded a committee to work for the establishment of a university open to women. She was one of the co-founders of the women's organization Hið íslenska kvenfélag. In 1897, she was elected the second president of the Hið íslenska kvenfélag after Sigþrúður Friðriksdóttir.
