= Iqlaque Fakir Mohammed Shaikh =

Murderer in India who fled parole

Iqlaque Fakir Mohammed Shaikh from New Mangalwar Peth, Pune, India was sentenced to life imprisonment for committing the murder of Gudrun Corvinus. Corvinus was a German archaeologist of the Nepal Research Center in Kathmandu. She was a member of the Afar expedition in Ethiopia which discovered the famous skeleton Lucy. While working in the Namib desert, she discovered animal fossils from the Miocene period. Corvinus moved to Nepal in 1984 and explored the region, specifically the Dang Deokhuri District, Dun valley, and Siwalik Hills.

Details about the death say that he stabbed Corvinus and beheaded her. After finding her severed head, Bund Garden police on 7 January 2006 found Iqlaque Fakir Mohammed Shaikh and arrested him within 7 hours.

He was given 14-day parole to look after his sick wife, but on the last day of parole was suspected to have run off with his wife and mother.

Despite numerous sightings, he is still at large and has not been taken into custody.

== See also ==
- List of fugitives from justice who disappeared
