= Sigþrúður Friðriksdóttir =

Icelandic women's rights activist

Sigþrúður Friðriksdóttir (1830 – 1912) was an Icelandic women's rights activist.

She was married to the high judge Jón Pétursson.

She was one of the co-founders of the women's organization Hið íslenska kvenfélag, which was founded in 1894, and served as its first president in 1894–1897. She was succeeded by Þorbjörg Sveinsdóttir.
