= Guðrún =

Guðrún, Gudrun
- Gender: Female

Origin
- Meaning: god + secret lore
- Region of origin: Scandinavia

Guðrún is a feminine given name. The English and German version of the name is Gudrun. It is one of the most frequently given female names in Iceland. In 2004, it was ranked first before Anna and Sigríður.

According to Icelandic custom, people are generally referred to by first and middle names and patronyms are used if disambiguation is required.

The name is earliest attested in a runestone as kuþrun. In Old Norse, Goðrún was an alternative version. The Faroese equivalent is Guðrun and the mainland Scandinavian version is Gudrun. The Old Norse name is composed of the elements guð or goð, meaning "god"; and rūn, meaning "rune", "secret lore". The Scandinavian Gudrun was revived in the last half of the 19th century.

== Notable people called Guðrún ==
- Guðrún Gjúkadóttir, person in the Eddic poems
- Guðrún Ósvífursdóttir (fl. C10-C11), protagonist of the Medieval Icelandic Laxdœla saga
- Guðrún Bjarnadóttir, Icelandic Miss International in 1963
- Guðrún Helgadóttir (1935–2022), Icelandic politician and writer of children's literature
- Guðrún Eva Mínervudóttir (born 1976), Icelandic writer
- Guðrún Ögmundsdóttir (1950–2019), Icelandic politician
- Guðrún Katrín Þorbergsdóttir, First Lady of Iceland (1996–1998)
- Guðrún Lárusdóttir (1880-1938), Icelandic politician and writer

== See also ==
- Gudrun, major figure in early Germanic literature
- Gudrun (given name)
