= Ólafía Jóhannsdóttir =

Icelandic teacher and temperance worker (1863–1924)

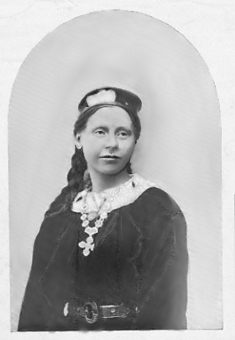
- Born: 22 October 1863; Mosfellsbær, Iceland
- Died: 21 June 1924 (aged 60); Oslo, Norway
- Monuments: Mosfellsbær, Iceland; Vaterlandsparken, Oslo, Norway
- Education: Menntaskólinn í Reykjavík
- Occupations: teacher; temperance worker; author; magazine editor; textbook translator
- Organizations: International Organisation of Good Templars; Woman’s Christian Temperance Union
- Known for: President, Iceland WCTU
- Notable work: De ulykkeligste
- Relatives: Þorbjörg Sveinsdóttir (aunt)

Ólafía Jóhannsdóttir (22 October 1863 – 21 June 1924) was an Icelandic teacher and temperance worker. She traveled and lectured in different countries on behalf of the International Organisation of Good Templars (IOGT) and the Woman’s Christian Temperance Union (WCTU), being proficient in English, Danish, Norwegian and German, in addition to her native Icelandic. She was an author, magazine editor, and textbook translator. It was Olafia's ambition to bring the women of Iceland to a position of equality with men.

== Early life and education ==
Ólafía Jóhannsdóttir was born at Mosfellsbær, near Reykjavík, Iceland, on 22 October 1863. Ólafía's relatives reared her after her parents' death. Her uncle was speaker of the Lower House of the National Council, and her aunt, Þorbjörg Sveinsdóttir, was prominent in public movements of every kind.

She was educated in the Children's School, the Woman's School, and at Menntaskólinn í Reykjavík. In 1892, she went to Denmark to pursue a course of study at Askov Højskole.

== Career ==
=== Educator and businesswoman ===
For some years, she was a teacher in the public school at Reykjavík. In 1893, she went to Norway as the representative of a British life insurance company, and later, introduced the business into Iceland and the Faroe Islands.

=== Temperance activist ===
Olafia became active in temperance work in 1885, when she joined the IOGT at Reykjavík, being one of the first women to become a member of it. In 1897, she became the Grand Vice Templar of Iceland in the IOGT.

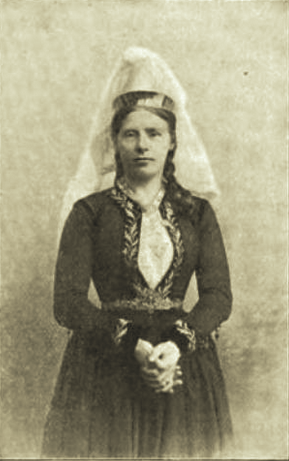
Ólafía Jóhannsdóttir (1897)

During her residence in Norway, she became interested in the WCTU, and became a White Ribboner. She worked among other temperance activists for a few months in the autumn of 1903, visiting seven places, to none of which she had been during her previous stay in Norway in 1901. She delivered twenty public addresses, four addresses to children, spoke at three drawing room meetings, three members' meetings and four festival gatherings. When the state of her health became precarious, she was compelled to give up the work.

On her return to Iceland, when the Icelandic Woman's Association in Reykjavík was founded, she became its vice-president. She reorganized the Women's Temperance Association, then existing in the island, and when Jessie Ackermann organized the WCTU in Iceland, Olafia became President (1896). She founded the first White Ribbon Union in that country, in 1898. During the period of 1895–1900, Olafia traveled through the greater part of Iceland while riding her pony, holding public meetings and working as a representative of the same temperance orders.

Olafia had the honor of being sent to Canada as the representative of both the WCTU and the IOGT, serving as organizer for each of those bodies. This included visiting the different Icelandic settlements in Manitoba in the interest of the IOGT. At the World's WCTU Convention held in Geneva, in 1903, she was appointed world missionary. Ólafía was also a delegate from Iceland to the World's Temperance Congress at London in 1900. Olafia's work as a World's WCTU White Ribbon Missionary is described in her report, which was included in the Biennial Convention and Minutes of the Executive Committee Meetings of the World's Woman's Christian Temperance Union of 1906:—

White Ribbon friends here wanted to have somebody to work a little among our unhappy women in the streets, and I thought that I might perhaps be able to do this, just take it quite easy, as I felt I was equal to it from day to day. They have prayed God for this, and I felt that I must try it, so as to see if it was God's will to give me necessary strength. I think that God has now given me just the work I love most to do, to go to the sick and unhappy, and try to tell them of God's salvation in Christ Jesus, after these five years, just the service of my old beloved White Ribbon. I visit the girls while they are shut in the hospitals, and then I shall visit them in their homes as God's grace opens for me. Some days I walk through the streets distributing Bible cards and papers among those I can. Every second and fourth Friday in the month the White Ribboners hold meetings with entertainments, Gospel reading, and refreshments, where they try to get the girls to come. We have Baxter's "Daily Light' translated in the Icelandic; White Ribboners have distributed many copies in the hospitals in the capital city and neighbourhood.

In 1899, after Ingibjörg Skaptadóttir retired from managing the monthly women's magazine Framsókn with her mother Sigríður Þorsteinsdóttir, Ingibjörg left her magazine to Ólafía and Jarþrúður Jónsdóttir. In 1916, Ólafía published a book entitled De ulykkeligste (The Miserables), dealing with the social issues of alcohol consumption, and showing the part played by alcohol in the production of these "miserables". The book had a wide circulation. She also translated textbooks and small books from English into Icelandic.

== Death and legacy ==
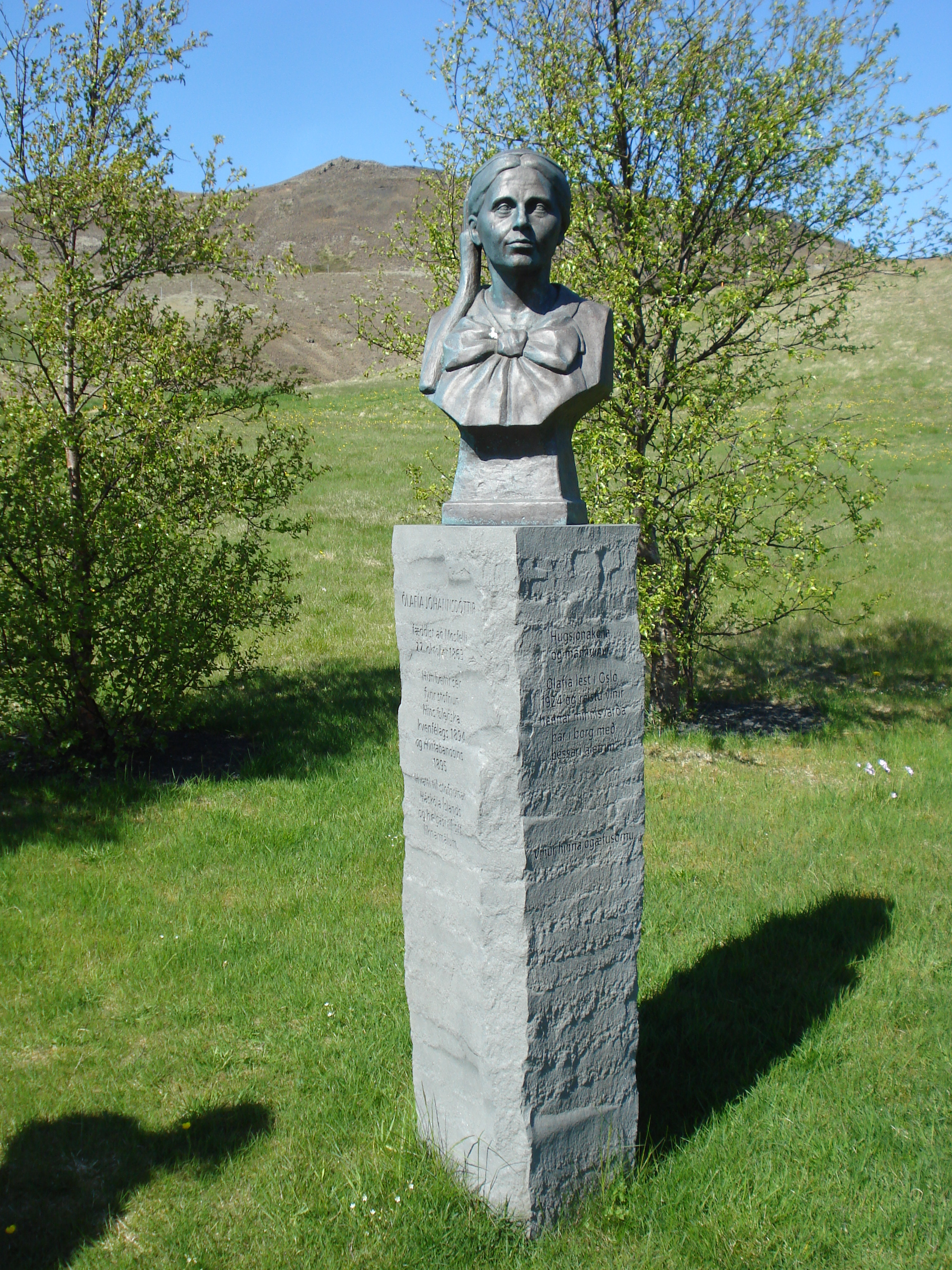
Monument at Mosfellsbær, Iceland

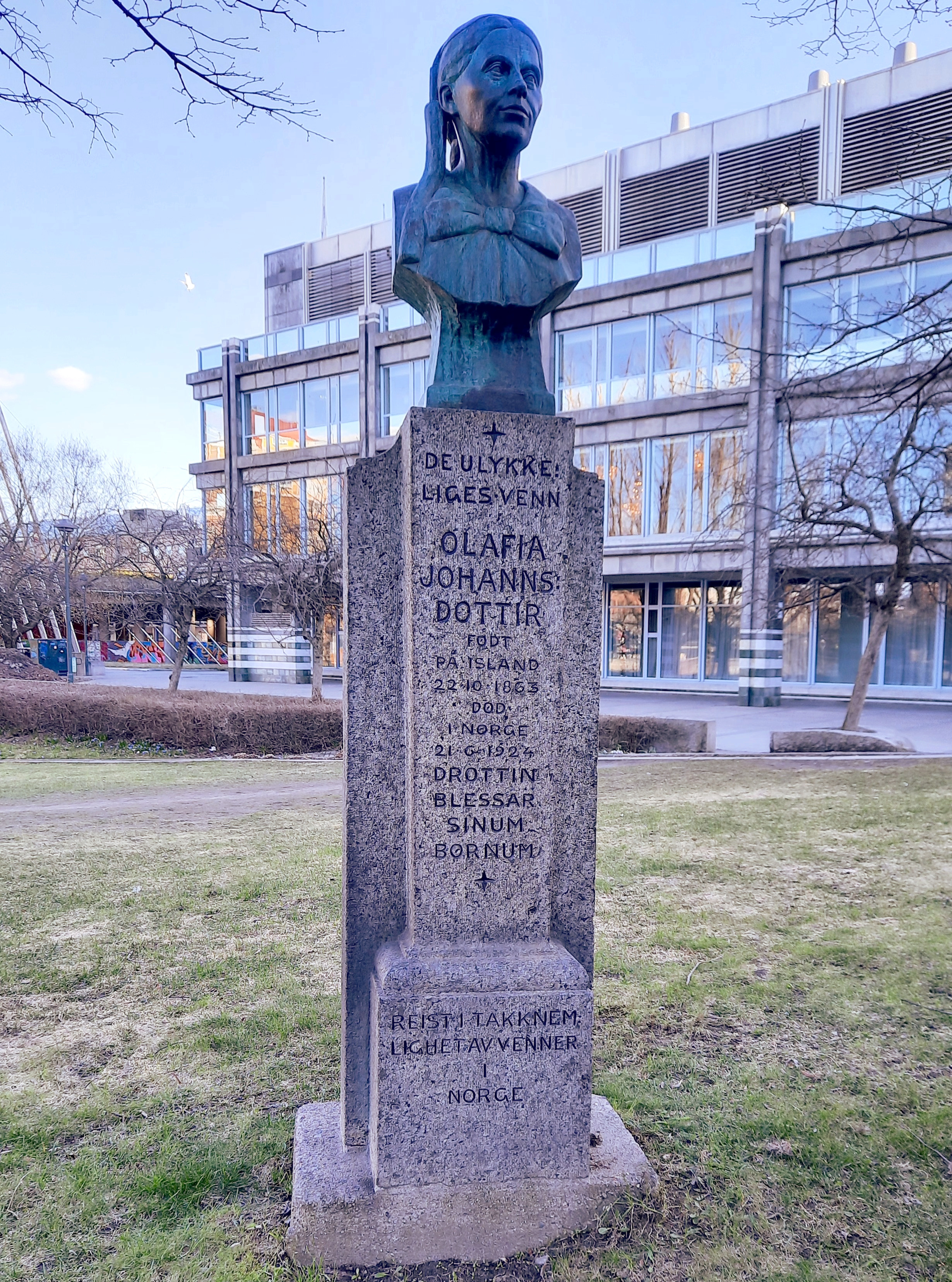
Monument at Vaterlandsparken, Oslo, Norway

Ólafía Jóhannsdóttir died in Oslo, Norway, 21 June 1924.

Sigríður Dúna Kristmundsdóttir won the Women's Literary Prize in 2006 for her biography of Ólafía Jóhannsdóttir.

== Selected works ==
- De ulykkeligste (The Miserables) (1916)
- The waiting shadow; the romantic and tragic story of a lovely Norwegian girl whose life was darkened by the consequences of one unguarded hour, by Sister Olafia Johannsdottir. Translated from the Icelandic by Charles Venn Pilcher; introduction by Victoria Booth-Clibborn Demarest (1927)
