= Gudrun (given name) =

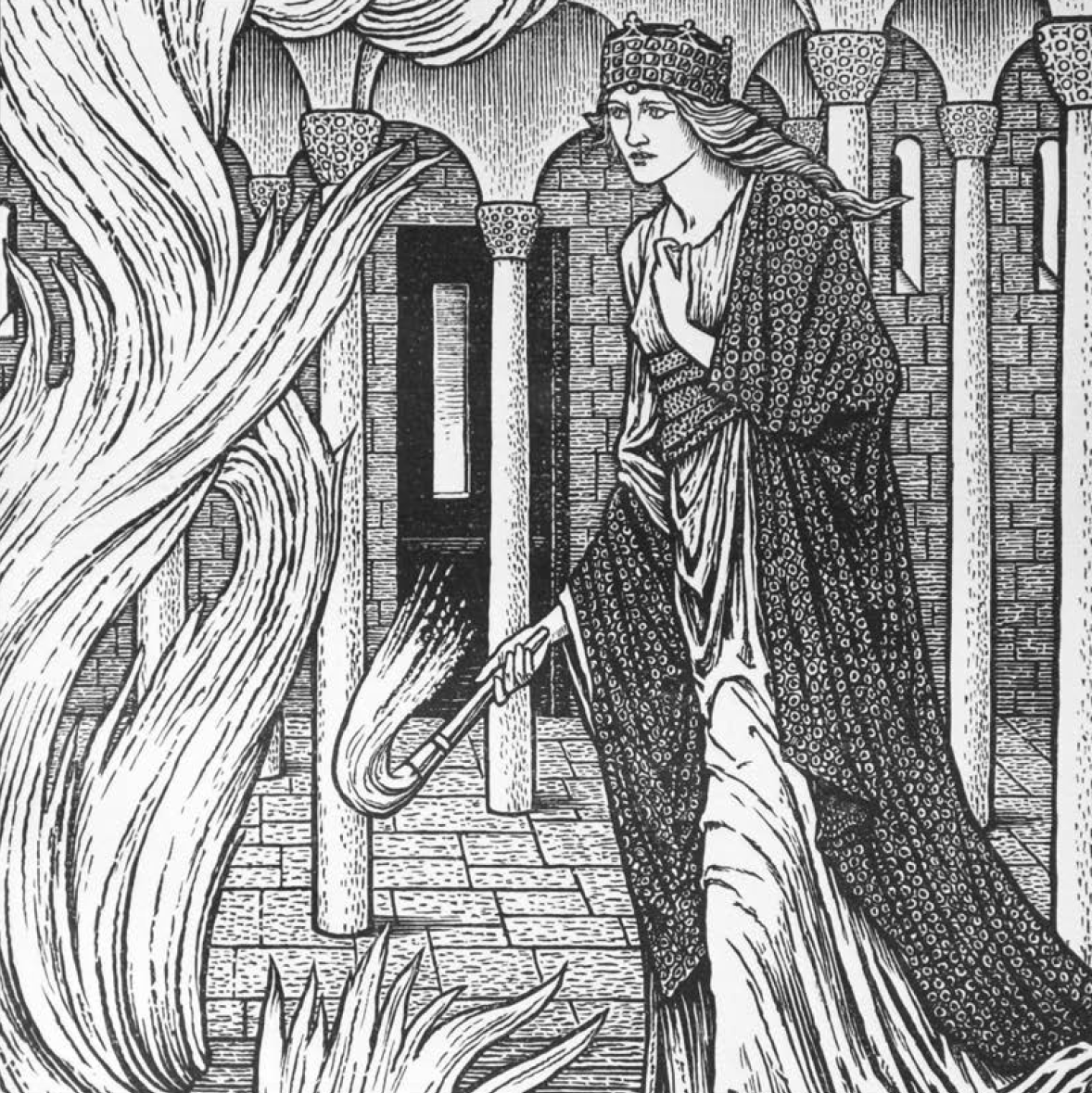
- Gudrun setting fire to Attila's residence, an 1898 woodcut by Edward Burne-Jones.
- Gender: Female

Origin
- Origin: Old Norse
- Meaning: god + secret lore
- Region of origin: Scandinavia

Other names
- Related names: Goðrún, Guðrun, Guðrún, Gutrune

Gudrun is a feminine given name of Old Norse origin derived from guð or goð, meaning "god"; and rūn, meaning "rune", or "secret lore". Gudrun, the Danish, Norwegian, and Swedish as well as the English and German form of the name, was revived and came into greater use in the latter half of the 19th century

The name is earliest attested in a runestone as kuþrun. The modern Icelandic version of the name is Guðrún. In Old Norse, Goðrún was an alternative version. The Faroese equivalent is Guðrun.

== Usage ==
The Icelandic variant Guðrún is one of the most frequently given female names in Iceland in modern times.

Gudrun was also in regular use for girls in Germany from the late 19th century through the 1960s, a time period when romantic German nationalism was in vogue and the names of idealized heroines such as Gudrun from Germanic heroic legend became more popular. Gudrun appeared as Gutrune in Götterdämmerung, the last of Richard Wagner's opera cycle Der Ring des Nibelungen. It was first performed in 1876. Other spellings and variants of the name have been used in various literary works. Such names were also encouraged by the Nazi Party in power from 1933 to 1945.

The name is also in occasional use in the Anglosphere, perhaps inspired by use of the name in the Wagner opera and for its use by English author D.H. Lawrence for a character in his 1920 novel Women in Love. A 1969 British film adaptation was based on the novel.

=== Gudrun ===
- Gudrun Abt (born 1962), German hurdler
- Gudrun Berend (1955–2011), German hurdler
- Gudrun Bjørner (1898–1959), Danish teacher and politician
- Gudrun Boysen (born 1939), Danish physician
- Gudrun Brost (1910–1993), Swedish actress
- Gudrun Burwitz (1929–2018), German neo-Nazi
- Gudrun Corvinus (1931–2006), German archaeologist
- Gudrun Ensslin (1940–1977), German terrorist
- Gudrun Gut (born 1957), German musician
- Ella Gudrun Ingeborg Holleufer (1906–1954), Danish first lady
- Gudrun Tandberg Høykoll (1924–2005), Norwegian politician
- Gudrun Kalmbach (1937–2025), German mathematician
- Gudrun Landgrebe (born 1950), German actress
- Gudrun Pausewang (1928–2020), German writer
- Gudrun Schaich-Walch (born 1946), German politician
- Gudrun Scholz (born 1940), German field hockey player
- Gudrun Schyman (born 1948), Swedish politician
- Gudrun Ure (1926–2024), Scottish actress
- Gudrun Wagner (1944–2007), German theatre manager
- Gudrun Zapf-von Hesse (1918–2019), German calligrapher
- Gudrun Zollner (born 1960), German politician

== See also ==
- Gudrun, major figure in early Germanic literature
