= Sigríður Sigurjónsdóttir =

Icelandic academic

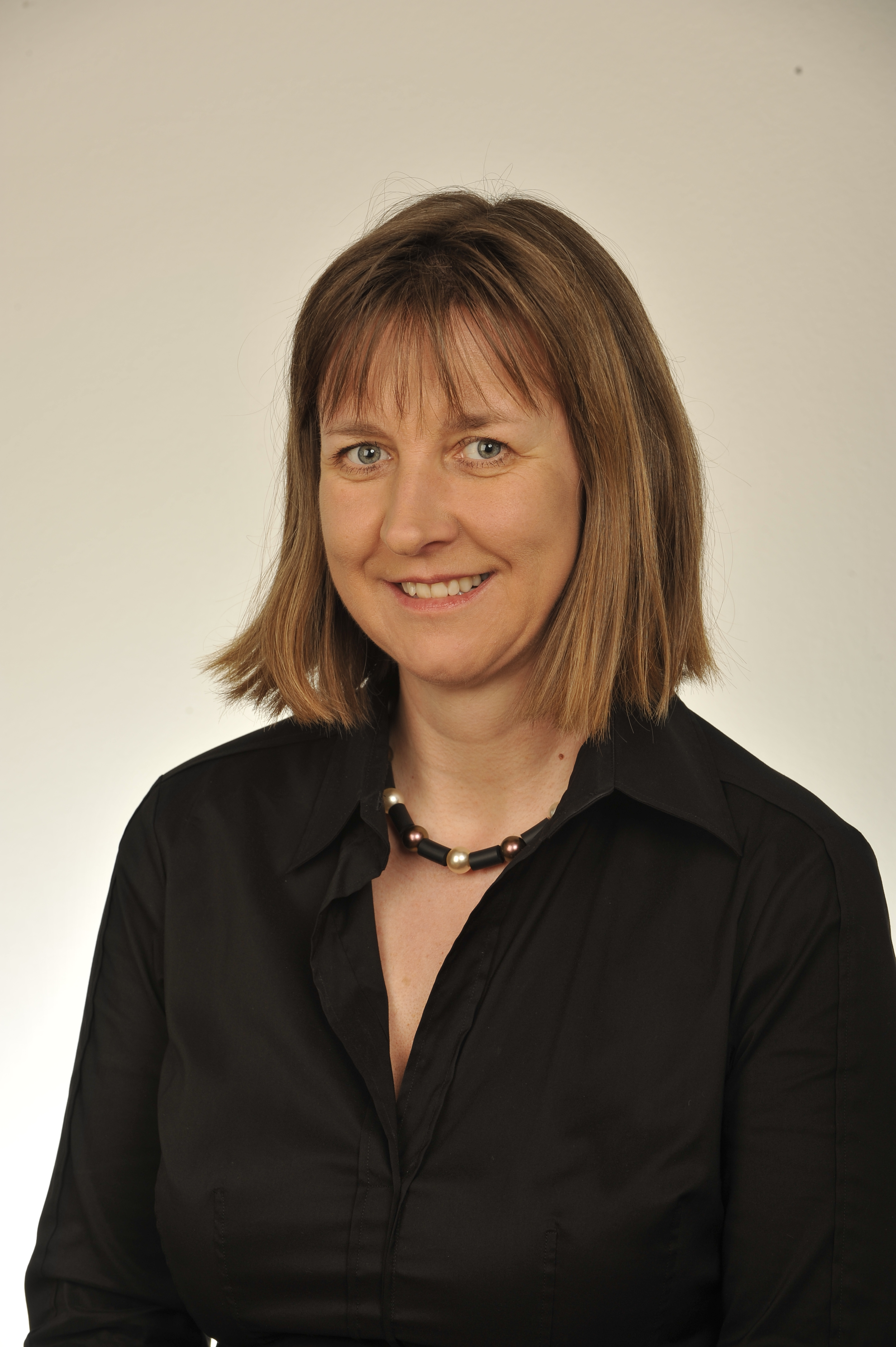
- Born: 27 September 1960 (age 66)
- Occupation: Professor of Icelandic Linguistics at the University of Iceland

Sigríður Sigurjónsdóttir (born 27 September 1960) is a professor of Icelandic Linguistics at the University of Iceland.

== Professional experience ==
Sigríður completed a BA in General Linguistics and Icelandic from the University of Iceland in 1984, a cand. mag. in Icelandic Linguistics in February 1987 from the same university, and a doctorate in Applied Linguistics from the University of California, Los Angeles (UCLA) in 1992. In 1993, she worked as a postdoctoral fellow at the Research Institute for Language and Speech (OTS) at Utrecht University in the Netherlands. Since 1994 she has been employed at the University of Iceland, first as an Assistant Professor 1994–1996, then Associate Professor 1996–2010, and full Professor since 2010.

== Research ==
Sigríður's main research areas are first language acquisition, language variation, and language change in modern Icelandic. She has written several peer reviewed articles on those subjects. In particular she has focused on Icelandic children's acquisition of syntax, especially binding, question formation, and verb movement, as well as on long distance reflexives in Icelandic, Faroese and Dutch. She has participated in many domestic and international research projects on syntactic change in modern Icelandic. Over the past two decades, she has together with her associate, Joan Maling linguist and Director of the National Science Foundation's Linguistics Program, worked extensively on the syntactic characteristics and sociological distribution of the Icelandic New Impersonal Construction, an innovative syntactic construction which surfaced in Icelandic in the last century. Sigríður and Joan conducted the first systematic study of this construction in the winter of 1999 to 2000.

Currently, Sigríður is focusing on the influence of the globally dominant English language on Icelandic through digital media and smart devices. She was the principal investigator (together with Eiríkur Rögnvaldsson Professor emeritus) of the research project: Modeling the Linguistic Consequences of Digital Language Contact, which was awarded a three-year grant of excellence from the Icelandic Research Fund in 2016. The main goal of the project was to construct a nation-wide profile of the amount and intensity that Icelandic speakers of different ages receive of Icelandic and English input, their attitudes to Icelandic and English, as well as of their language use and competence. The results of the project shed light on the status of Icelandic, which in recent years has been brought into close contact with English through digital media.Drude, Sebastian; Sigurðsson, Einar Freyr; Ingason, Anton Karl; Rögnvaldsson, Eiríkur; Kristinsson, Ari Páll; Nowenstein, Iris Edda; Arnbjörnsdóttir, Birna; Sigurjónsdóttir, Sigríður (October 2017). "Digital resources and language use: Expanding the EGIDS scale for language development into the digital domains" (PDF). In Ostler, Nicholas; Ferreira, Vera; Moseley, Chris (eds.). Communities in Control: Learning tools and strategies for multilingual endangered language communities. 21st FEL Conference. Hungerford, United Kingdom: Foundation for Endangered Languages. pp. 98–106. ISBN 978-0-9560210-9-0. Sigríður is also on the board of directors of a research project from 2018 to 2021 on young people's Icelandic directed by Helga Hilmisdóttir, Associate Research Professor at the Árni Magnússon Institute for Icelandic Studies.

== Other work and projects ==
Sigríður has served on various committees both within and outside academia. She was vice-chairman of the Icelandic Sign Language Council from 2016 to 2020, and she served on the executive committee of the Icelandic Language Council from 1998 to 2008. These Councils provide advice to the Icelandic government on matters concerning Icelandic and Icelandic sign language policy. Sigríður was Chairman of the Icelandic Linguistics Society from 1997 to 2001, Director of the Institute of Linguistics at the University of Iceland from 2006 to 2010, and Chairman of the expert panel in Humanities & Social Sciences for the Icelandic Student Innovation Fund from 2015 to 2017. She also served as one of the language specialists who on behalf of the Ministry of Education composed a curriculum guide in Icelandic for compulsory schools in 2007, participated in developing a framework of criteria for final examinations in Icelandic at the upper secondary school level, and as a member of the Icelandic Language Council took part in composing the Icelandic language policy, which was legalized by the Icelandic parliament Althingi on 12 March 2009. In addition, Sigríður has organized and taken part in organizing several international conferences and workshops on linguistics at the University of Iceland, e.g. GALANA 9, NELS 48, DiGS17, SCL 25, CGSW 17, and is on the editorial board of the journal Journal of Comparative Germanic Linguistics.

== Childhood and personal life ==
Sigríður's parents are Sigurjón Hreiðar Gestsson (1930- ), upper atmosphere observer at the Icelandic Meteorological Office from 1950 to 2000, and Inga Guðrún Gunnlaugsdóttir, practical nurse (1930–2015). Sigríður grew up in Reykjavik and graduated from Hamrahlíð Junior College (upper secondary school) in the spring of 1979. She is married to Eiríkur Steingrímsson, Professor of genetics at the Faculty of Medicine of the University of Iceland, and they have two daughters.
