= Gudrun Corvinus =

German archaeologist

- Born: 1932; Stettin, Weimar Germany
- Died: 7 January 2006 (aged 73–74); Pune, India
- Education: University of Bonn
- Known for: Discovering Paleolithic sites and being part of the Afar Research Expedition
- Scientific career
- Fields: Geology, Paleontology, Archaeology

Gudrun Corvinus (1932–2006) was a German geologist, paleontologist and archaeologist. Her contributions through her field work, academic monologues and archeological excavation discoveries are vast and have contributed to continued scientific discoveries. Corvinus’ work gained professional recognition prior to her murder, which took place in her home in Pune, India, on January 7, 2006.

== Early and personal life ==
Corvinus was born in Stettin, then part of Weimar Germany, in 1932. She spent most of her early years in Germany. As a child, Corvinus was fond of many things including people, cultures, music, travelling, and different scientific disciplines. She was known by others to be friendly and humble.

Throughout her life, Corvinus had many friends. After they met in 1975, Corvinus and Ulla (Ursula) Musgnug had been close friends throughout their lives. Musgnug was also a trained anthropologist working through the Cape Town University. She has lived in the United States, Germany, and South Africa. Corvinus and Musgnug remained good friends despite their world travels. Corvinus had named Musgnug her legal heir, thus after Corvinus’ death, Musgnug inherited her works, such as photographs, slides and books. Musgnug has donated many items and works with the Sharma Centre for Heritage Education in India to keep the legacy of Gudrun Corvinus alive.

== Education and career ==
She studied geology, vertebrate paleontology and Palaeolithic archaeology at the University of Bonn, and completed her doctoral dissertation on Jurassic Ammonites from France. Her focus shifted to Paleolithic archaeology after her doctoral dissertation. Later in her career she was affiliated with the University of Tübingen where she studied geology, paleontology and prehistory.

After marrying a man from Pune, Corvinus became interested in the geology and prehistory of India, which became the main focus of her research associated with Deccan College. At Deccan College she established foundational associations and ties with numerous mentors and colleagues. She received a research fellowship from the Council of Scientific and Industrial Research (New Delhi) for a project entitled Early Man in India. Corvinus also worked in Africa, being part of the original Afar Research Expedition team with Donald Johnson that discovered Lucy, a female hominin belonging to Australopithecus afarensis, and other prehistoric hominin sites in Ethiopia. While in Ethiopia, Corvinus also found 2.6 million year old artifacts. Corvinus was the first person responsible for discovering Paleolithic sites there that turned out to be among the oldest archaeological evidence in the world, which few are aware of.

Gudrun was not recognized immediately following her work and was not credited for her contribution towards her field due to the fact that she tended to work alone and not many people knew she was even part of the Afar Research Expedition Team. Corvinus received belated professional recognition. She left the group not long after the discovery of Lucy due to both political issues in Ethiopia and social issues within the group.

After discontinuing her work with the Afar Research Expedition, Corvinus worked for De Beers as a Senior Geologist in Namibia diamond mines during the 1970s up to 1980. Her job included locating diamond deposits as well as fossil-bearing Miocene sediments along the coast of Namibia. It was here where she not only found fossils that dated back to 18 million years ago, but also many Paleolithic artefacts. While in Namibia and South Africa, Gudrun worked as a geologist, archaeologist and even spent some time as a tour guide. After discovering many things in Africa, in 1984 Gudrun decided to move to Nepal where she researched for 20 years in the Siwalik Mountain Ranges and was able to do so by funding from the German Research Foundation.

== Research in India ==
Gudrun started her scientific career studying Jurassic ammonites from France, but later shifted to Palaeolithic archaeology. In 1964, Corvinus examined the Pravara drainage system in the Nevasa area of Maharashtra through an independent multi-disciplinary project. After a survey on the geomorphology of the entire Pravara Valley, suggested by H.D. Sankalia, Corvinus came across the Archeulian factory site at the junction of Chirki with the Pravara, 2 miles downstream from Nevasa. After being funded by the Wenner-Gren Foundation and Deutsche Forschungsgemeinschaft (the German Research Council), she decided to excavate the site, which lasted 3 winter seasons from 1966–1969. The lengthy excavation resulted in the revelation of rich Early Archeulian assemblage in fine-grained context in the gullies of Chirki area. Besides this, a great number of well-preserved fossil wood pieces, faunal specimens, and tree trunks were found in the alluvium. In 1981, Corvinus published her first classic monograph, “A Survey of the Pravara River System in Western Maharashtra, India”. Her second monograph, “A Survey of the Pravara River System in Western Maharashtra, India” was published in 1983. This makes her the first to publish monographs on the geology and archaeology of an Archaeulian site in the entire Indian subcontinent. These monographs are still highly renowned and her data has continued to be utilized in geologic work to this day.

In 1985, following her work at Chirki-on-Neval (India), Gudrun Corvinus began explorations in the foothills of Siwalik Hills of Western Nepal. In the span of twelve years (1988-2006), she was rewarded with findings and discoveries of numerous Paleolithic sites and rich faunal and floral assemblages ranging from the Miocene to the Pleistocene. The discovery of an unexpected wealth of occupation sites from the Paleolithic to the Neolithic were found in the Dun Valleys of Dang-Deokhuri District in the Siwalik Hills, and an area along the Rato River in East Nepal. From a sandstone succession near Rato Khola, Corvinus discovered the skull of Archidiskodon planifrons. Evidence of hand axe indicate human occupation can be dated back at least the late Middle Pleistocene. Most significantly, her finding of the Acheulian sites demonstrates that despite the scarce materials, the early South Asian Acheulian hominins were able to cross the vast Indo-Gangetic floodplain.

== Murder ==
On 7 January 2006, Corvinus was discovered by the Bund Garden police stabbed and beheaded in her apartment in Pune. Gudrun had not been seen since December 30. The police were called when her friends could not get a hold of her by phone and she wouldn't answer her door. She was later identified by her passport.

Her head was recovered from the riverbed near the Kharadi bridge.

Iqlaque Fakir Mohammed Shaikh, a 27-year-old real estate agent, was arrested within seven hours after Corvinus’ decapitated body was found. He was found guilty of her murder and sentenced to life in prison and a ₹11,000 fine. He was also found guilty of destroying evidence and theft, carrying a sentence of seven years and three years of rigorous imprisonment respectively. The public prosecutor of the case, Neelima Vartak, stated that Corvinus was murdered for her property. Corvinus' ashes were scattered in the Western Ghats. Gudrun Corvinus has been featured since her death for her significant contributions to the scientific community by various geological and archaeological organizations.

Shaikh was later given a 14-day parole to look after his sick wife, but on the last day of parole was suspected to have run off with his wife and mother. Despite numerous sightings, he is still at large and has not been taken into custody.

== Selected publications ==
- 1968. An Acheulian Occupation Floor at Chirki-on-Pravara, India. Current Anthropology, 9(2/3), 216–218.
- 1968. Stratigraphy and Geological Background of an Acheulian Site at Chirki-on-Pravara, India: A Work Report on the Excavation during the Winter Season 1966/67. Anthropos, 63/64(5/6), 921-940.
- 1970. The Acheulian Workshop at Chirki on the Pravara river, Maharashtra. Indian Antiquary, 4(1), 13.
- 1970. On Paleolithic Occupation Floors in India. Current Anthropology, 11(4/5), 483–484.
- 1971. Iravati Karve (1905–1970). Anthropologischer Anzeiger, 33(1), 83–84.
- 1971. Pleistocene Fossil Wood From Chirki-on-Pravara. Current Anthropology, 12(3), 383.
- 1972. Some Observations on the Quaternary of Western Maharashtra (India).
- 1975. Palaeolithic remains at the Hadar in the Afar region. Nature, 256(5517), 468–471.
- 1977. History of the Nile valley. Nature, 266(5605), 799.
- 1981. A Survey of the Pravara River System in Western Maharashtra, India. Volume 1: The Stratigraphy and Geomorphology of the Pravara River System. Tübingen: Verlag Archaeologica Venatoria. ISBN 3-921618-13-4
- 1983. A Survey of the Pravara River System in Western Maharashtra, India. Volume 2: The Excavations of the Acheulian Site of Chirki-on-Pravara, India. Tübingen: Verlag Archaeologica Venatoria. ISBN 3-921618-14-2
- 1985. An Acheulian industry within the raised beach complex of the CDM concession area, S. W. Mrica (Namibia).
- 1987. Patu, a New Stone Age Site of a Jungle Habitat in Nepal.
- 1989. The Patu industry in its environment in the Siwaliks in Eastern Nepal.
- 1989. Magnetostratigraphy of the Neogene Surai Khola Siwaliks m West-Nepal: Preliminary results.
- 1991. A handaxe assemblage from western Nepal.
- 1995. The Satpati handaxe site and the Chabeni uniface site in southern Nepal.
- 2001. Biostratigraphy and geology of the neogene Siwalik group of the Surai Khola and Rato Khola areas in Nepal. Palaeogeography, Palaeoclimatology, Palaeoecology, 165(3), 251–279.
- 2004. Homo erectus in East and Southeast Asia, and the questions of the age of the species and its association with stone artifacts, with special attention to handaxe-like tools. Quaternary International, 117(1), 141–151.
- 2005. Prehistoric Cultures in Nepal from the Early Palaeolithic to the Neolithic and the Quaternary Geology of the Dang-Deokhuri Dun Valleys.
