= Sigríður Dúna Kristmundsdóttir =

Icelandic academic

Sigríður Dúna Kristmundsdóttir (born 1952) is a professor of anthropology at the University of Iceland.

== Professional career ==
Sigríður Dúna completed her B.Sc. (Econ) in Anthropology in 1975 from the London School of Economics and Political Science, an MA in anthropology from the University of Rochester, New York, in 1980 and a doctorate in anthropology from the same university in 1990. She also studied anthropology at L’Université de Paris VII in the winter of 1976–1977.

Sigríður Dúna began teaching anthropology part-time at the University of Iceland in 1980 and did so with breaks until 1990 when she obtained tenure. She has been Professor of Anthropology at the University of Iceland since 2000 and was Deputy Head of the Department of Social Sciences from 2000 to 2005.

From 1983 to 1987, Sigríður Dúna was a Member of Parliament for the Women's List, representing the constituency of Reykjavík. She was one of the founders of the Women's List and in 1981 of the Women's Slate in municipal elections in Reykjavík. From 2006 to 2011, she took an unpaid sabbatical from her professorship to serve as Ambassador in Iceland's Foreign Service, first in South Africa and then in Norway.

Sigríður Dúna has served on various committees and boards. From 1985 to 1992 she sat on the Constitutional Committee of Iceland and from 1989 to 1993 on the board of directors of the Icelandic International Development Agency. She chaired the University of Iceland's public relations committee from 1991 to 1993 and was chairman of the board of directors of the University of Iceland's Institute of Anthropology from 1997 to 2001. She sat on the grants committee of the Icelandic Film Fund from 1989 to 1991 and again in 1996. She was on the editorial board of the Nordic Journal of Women's Studies (NORA) from 1991 to 1995, on the specialist committee of the Nordic Ministers Committee for Social Science Research on Environmental Affairs from 1991 to 1998, on UNESCO's Advisory Group on Gender 1994 to 1997, on the Equal Rights Committee of Iceland's National Church from 1997 to 1999 and on the grants committee of The Icelandic Centre for Research from 1997 to 1999. In 1999 she organised and chaired the conference “Women and Democracy”, held by the Government of Iceland, with the participation of the Nordic Council of Ministers and the governments of the United States, Russia, and the Baltic countries. She sat on the board of directors of the Leifur Eiríksson Foundation from 2000 to 2005, on the University of Iceland's Centennial History Editorial Board from 2005 to 2011, on the board of directors of the Nordic Cultural Foundation of the Åland Islands from 2015 to 2016, and on Althingi's Advisory Committee on Honorary Artists' Salaries from 2015 to 2018. From 2012 to 2014, she was the patroness of UN Women in Iceland.

== Honours ==
In 2000, Sigríður Dúna received the Icelandic Order of the Falcon for her work on equal rights affairs. She won the Icelandic Literary Prize in 2001 for her biography of Björg C. Þorláksson and the Women's Literary Prize in 2006 for her biography of Ólafía Jóhannsdóttir.

== Research ==
Sigríður Dúna's research focused at first on French structuralism, its analysis of myths and analogy with music. Gradually her research moved into feminist studies and political anthropology. Her doctoral dissertation in 1990 analyses the history of Icelandic women's movements from 1870 to 1990 using the concept of the person among other theoretical perspectives. Sigríður Dúna has published a number of articles in feminist- and political anthropology as well as two biographies of forgotten but remarkable Icelandic women. Sigríður Dúna has also published on theory and method in anthropology and taught hundreds of students during her professional career. She is now semi-retired as professor at the University of Iceland.

== Personal life ==
Sigríður Dúna grew up in Reykjavik. Her parents are Sigríður Júlíusdóttir (1930 - 2020) and Kristmundur Jónsson (b. 1929). Sigríður Dúna is married to Friðrik Sophusson and they have one daughter. Sigríður Dúna was previously married to Hjálmar H. Ragnarsson and they had one son.
