= Sigríður Þorsteinsdóttir =

Icelandic editor and publisher

Sigríður Þorsteinsdóttir (1841–1924) was an Icelandic editor and publisher.

She founded, managed and published the monthly women's magazine Framsókn, in collaboration with her daughter Ingibjörg Skaptadóttir, between 1895 and 1899. The magazine was the first women's magazine in Iceland, placed focus on women's access to education and encouraged women to demand and use their rights. She and her daughter belonged to the first female editors, publishers and journalists on Iceland. She retired in 1899 and left her magazine to Jarþrúður Jónsdóttir and Ólafía Jóhannsdóttir.
