= Sigrid Grajek =

German actress and musician (born 1963)

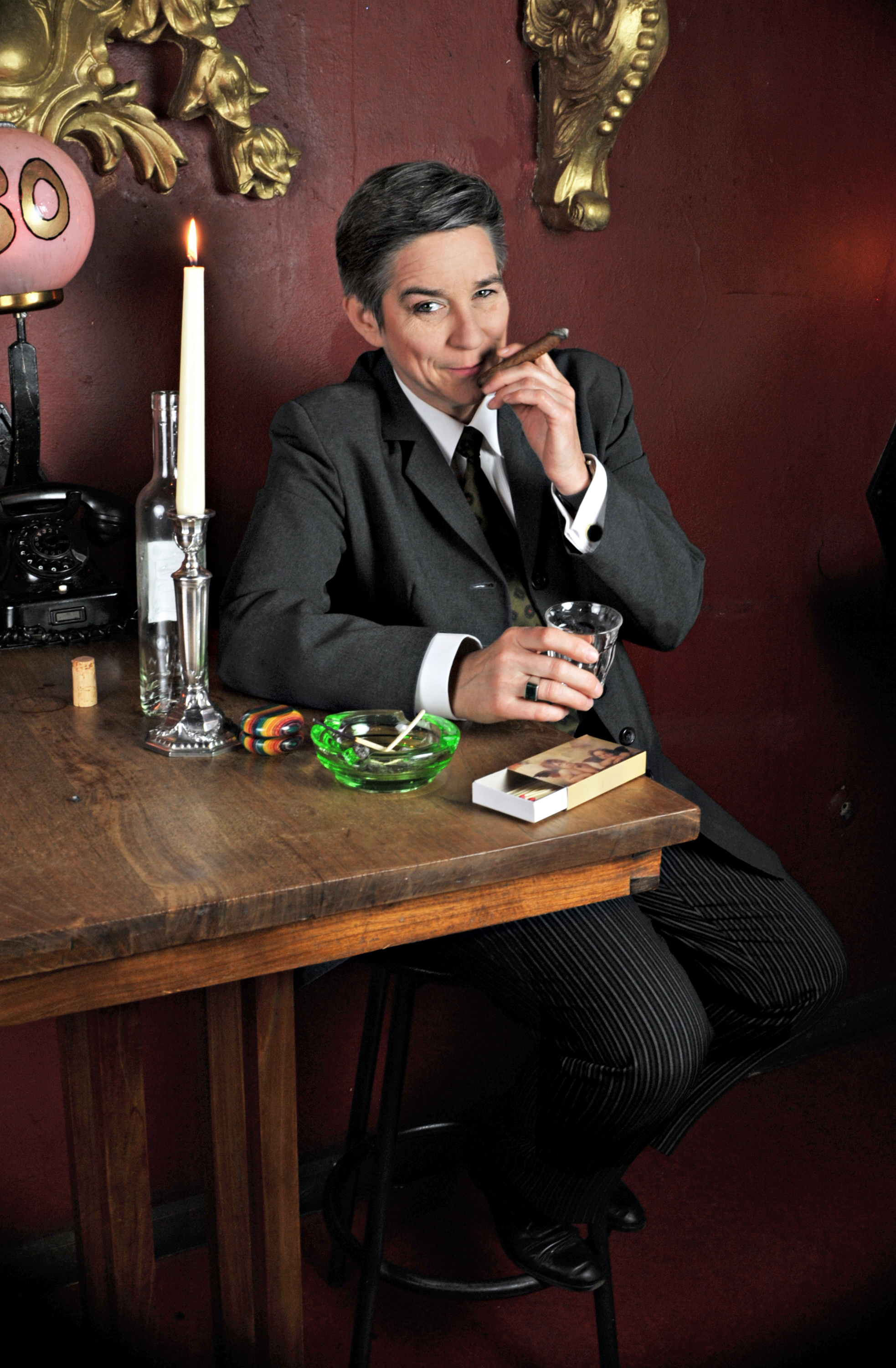
Image of Sigrid Grajek

Sigrid Grajek (born 1963 in Lünen) is a German actor and cabaret actress.

== Life ==
Grajek's professional career in acting was shaped by previous experience in the metal processing industry before she completed her Abitur on the second educational path. From 1985 to 1991, she gained her first experience as an actress and assistant director at the Theatermanufaktur Berlin under the guidance of Ilse Scheer, Otto Zonschitz and Rudolf Stodola. She then expanded her experience as an assistant director at the Jedermann Festival under Brigitte Grothum. From 1997 to 2001 she was a guest actress at the Stadttheater Bremerhaven and from 1995 to 2011 an ensemble member of the cabaret Berliner Brett'l. Since 1998, she has been on the road with the comedy character Coco Lorès and, as Coco, has hosted the midnight show at the Chamäleon-Varieté Berlin and the newcomer casting at the Krystallpalast Leipzig. She has also been touring with her solo program Cocooning since 2005. In January 2020, she conceived the program Berlin. The 1920s – A city in turmoil.

== Work ==
Since 1998, Grajek has been active in various programs and moderated events. In 2007, she created the program Claire Waldoff: Ich will aber gerade vom Leben singen ... to mark the 50th anniversary of Claire Waldoff's death. In addition to her work as a cabaret artist, she has also appeared in various television series and feature films, such as Revolvo.

=== Coco Lorès ===
The character Coco Lorès was created by Grajek and a pianist at the end of the 1990s on the occasion of the 18th birthday of the Café Theater Schalotte. They reworked a previously written program and performed in comic costumes, giving birth to the characters Pia Noforte and Coco Lorès. The performance was extremely successful, so much so that the Café Theater Schalotte subsequently commissioned an entire program. In 1999, the premiere of Mit Ton und Takt aus dem Jahrtausend took place, in which Coco Lorès puts forward the thesis that life is a spiral and that one always passes over in the same curve – everything always repeats itself only slightly changed, which is an experience in itself. In the program Cocooning the retreat into the private sphere is thematized.

=== Claire Waldoff ===
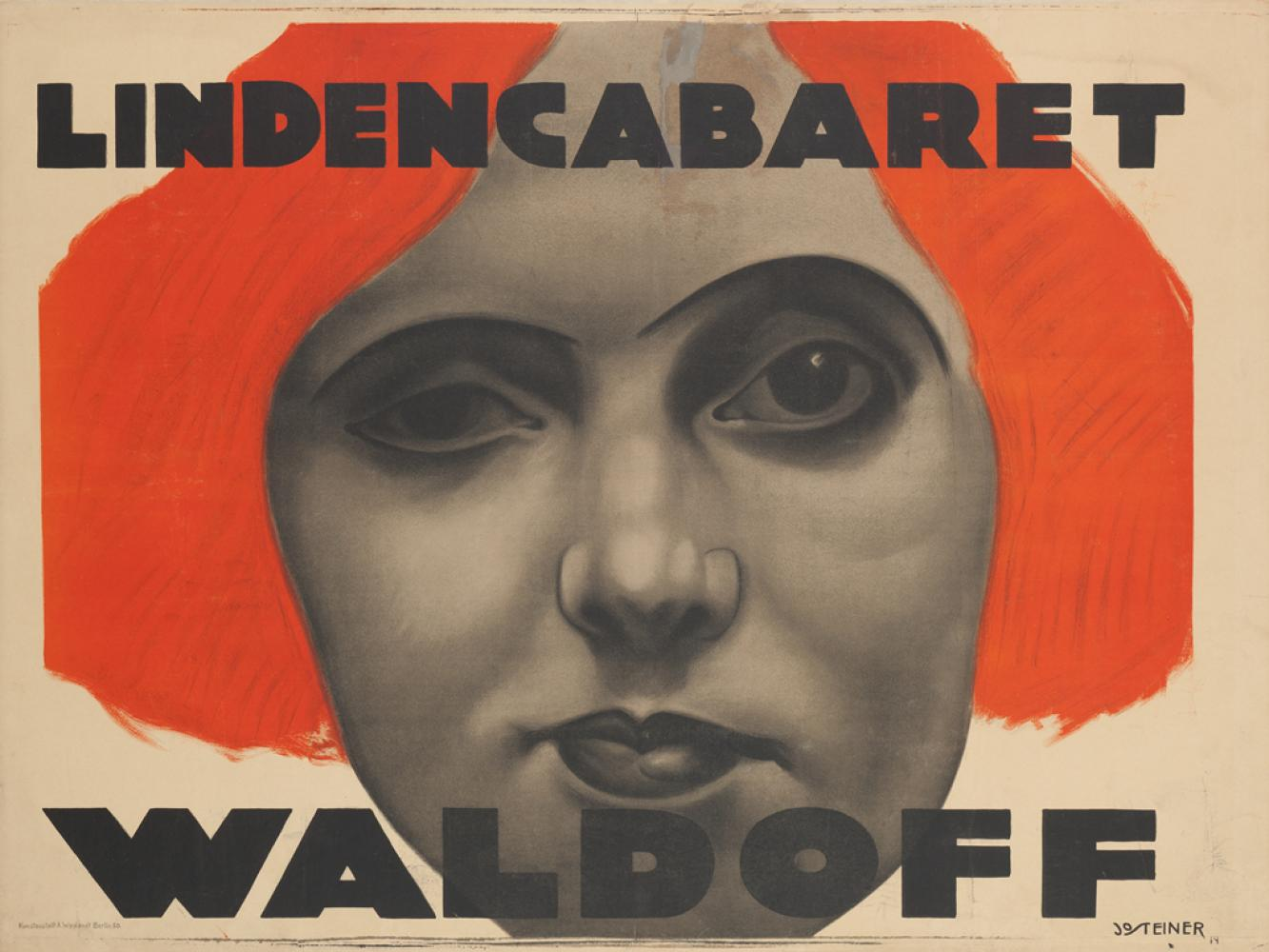

In the early 1990s, Grajek worked as a singer in the Berliner Brett'l and came into contact with the songs of the 1920s. The cabaret legacy of Claire Waldoff in particular inspired Grajek to include some of Waldoff's songs in her repertoire. Die Idee, ein Solo-Programm zu machen, kam von ihrem damaligen Chef im Berliner Brett'l. So kam es, dass es ein Waldoff-Programm wurde. Ich will aber gerade vom Leben singen... enthält 20 Gassenhauer, literarischen Chansons und Couplets des unverwechselbaren Stars der Kabaretts: Claire Waldoff. From 2007, Sigrid Grajek presented her program Claire Waldoff: Ich will aber gerade vom Leben singen ... , a femmage to Claire Waldoff, who was not only known in Berlin at the time, and thus brought her back into the present. Both Claire Waldoff and Grajek broke with conventional ideas about images of women and female roles. Grajek never allowed herself to be forced into the role of a classically feminine actress Gemeinsam mit ihrer Rolle als Claire Waldoff hat sie die Herkunft aus dem Ruhrpott und die Liebe zu Berlin. Grajek ist in der Rolle Waldoffs regelmäßig im BKA-Theater, im Ballhaus Berlin und auf Bühnen in ganz Deutschland zu sehen.

In 2018, she was awarded the Berlin Prize for Lesbian* Visibility for her services and tireless efforts to strengthen lesbian life and the LGBTIQ community.
