= 328 Gudrun =

Main-belt asteroid

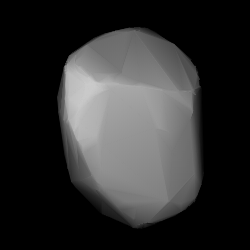
- Modelled shape of Gudrun from its lightcurve

Discovery
- Discovered by: Max Wolf
- Discovery site: Heidelberg Obs.
- Discovery date: 18 March 1892

Designations
- Pronunciation: /ˈɡʊdruːn/
- Named after: Gudrun
- Minor planet category: Main belt

Orbital characteristics
- Epoch 31 July 2016 (JD 2457600.5)
- Uncertainty parameter 0
- Observation arc: 104.41 yr (38135 d)
- Aphelion: 3.43998 AU (514.614 Gm)
- Perihelion: 2.78126 AU (416.071 Gm)
- Semi-major axis: 3.11062 AU (465.342 Gm)
- Eccentricity: 0.10588
- Orbital period (sidereal): 5.486 yr (2,003.9 d)
- Mean anomaly: 325.246°
- Mean motion: 0° 10^{m} 46.747^{s} / day
- Inclination: 16.1164°
- Longitude of ascending node: 352.328°
- Argument of perihelion: 103.924°

Physical characteristics
- Dimensions: 146 km 122.59±3.72 km
- Mass: (3.16±0.46)×10^{18} kg
- Mean density: 3.27±0.55 g/cm^{3}
- Synodic rotation period: 10.992 h (0.4580 d)
- Geometric albedo: 0.0425±0.004
- Spectral type: Cgh
- Absolute magnitude (H): 8.8

328 Gudrun is a large main-belt asteroid. It was discovered by German astronomer Max Wolf on March 18, 1892, in Heidelberg. This minor planet is orbiting the Sun at a distance of 3.11 AU with a period of 5.486 yr and an orbital eccentricity of 0.106. The orbital plane is inclined at an angle of 16.1° to the plane of the ecliptic.

Analysis of the light curve generated from photometric data collected in March 2012 provide a rotation period estimate of 10.992±0.002 h with a brightness variation of 0.32±0.02 in B magnitude. A study in 2022 found a classification of Cgh for 328 Gudrun, suggesting this is a dark, carbonaceous asteroid.
