= Edward John Primeau =

American audio/video forensics expert (born 1958)

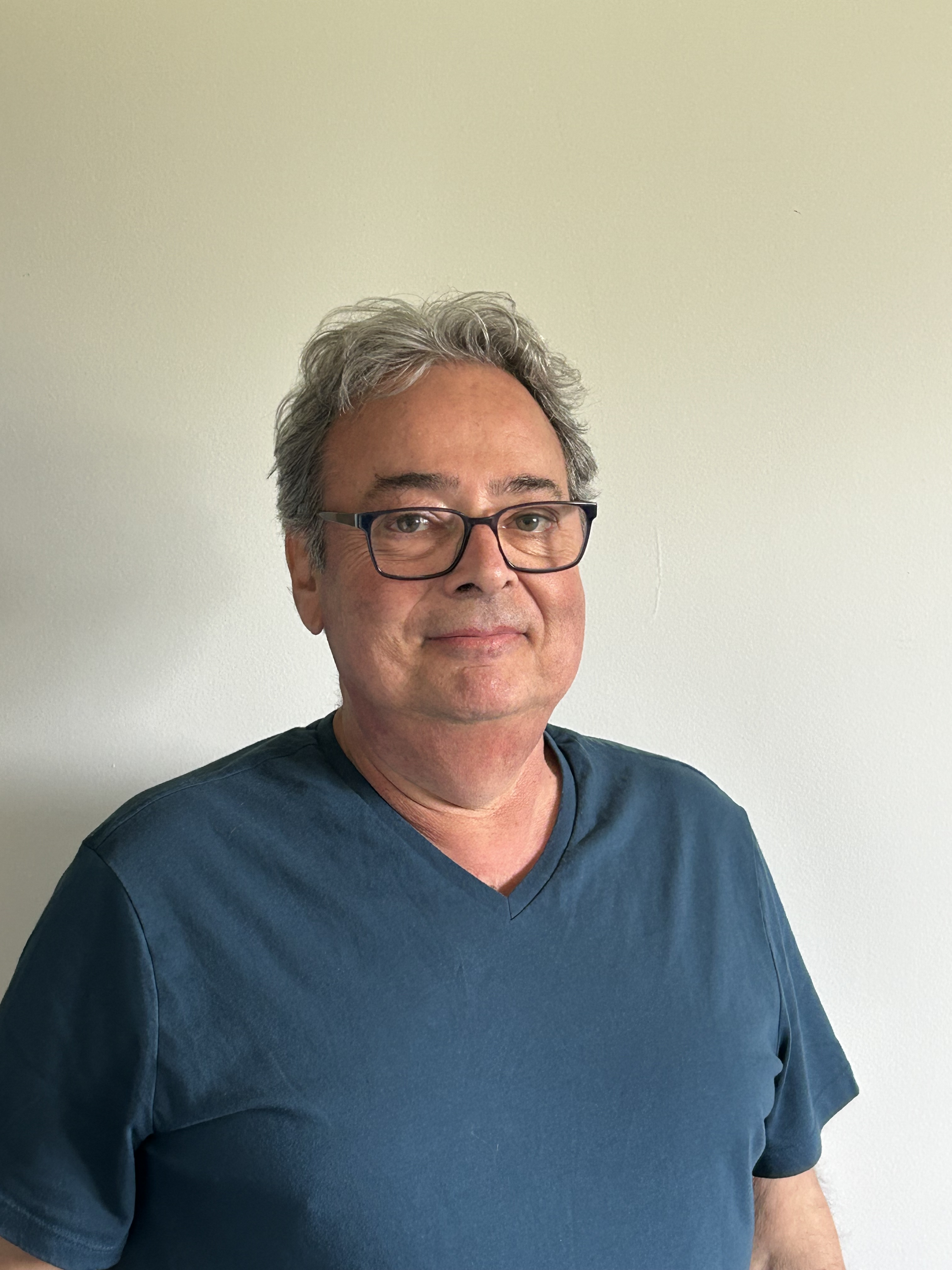
- Born: 1958 (age 67–68); Detroit, Michigan, U.S.
- Occupations: Audio forensics, Forensic video analysis
- Years active: 1979-present
- Board member of: American Board of Recorded Evidence, American College of Forensic Examiners, Audio Engineering Society, International Association for Identification
- Website: www.primeauforensics.com

Edward John Primeau (born 1958) is an American audio and video forensics expert based in Rochester Hills, Michigan. He became known for working on the audio analysis of cases such as the killing of Trayvon Martin, Air Force One radio transmissions after the assassination of John F. Kennedy, and Malaysia Airlines Flight 370.

== Early life and education ==
Edward Primeau was born in Detroit, Michigan, United States. From 1979 to 1985, he attended the University of Detroit, majoring in communication studies and minoring in criminal justice.

== Career ==
Primeau started his career as a forensics expert in 1979, helping the FBI in its sting operation carried out against Detroit judges. He also notably investigated the death of Terrance Franklin, disproving the police officers' narrative and resolving the case.

In February 2012, Primeau worked on the Trayvon Martin shooting case. Primeau was asked to determine whether the 911 tape showed that Trayvon Martin or George Zimmerman was screaming. He said he believed it was Martin.

In the same year, Primeau was approached by author and JFK assassination researcher Bill Kelly, who wanted technical help in combining two audiotapes of Air Force One radio transmissions. Primeau concluded that parts of the original tape were missing.

In October 2013, Primeau was hired by an Orlando Sentinel journalist to analyze the voice of Susan Bennett, an American voice-over artist, known for providing the female American voice of Apple's Siri. After finishing his analysis, and the comparison of the Siri voice and Bennett's, he claimed the voices were a 100% match, thus confirming Bennett provided her voice for Siri.

In 2014, he was working on the case of Malaysia Airlines Flight 370. Primeau concluded that tape edits were obviously made. Primeau was asked by CNN to analyze tapes made by Trump attorney Michael Cohen. This included a three-minute conversation of Cohen with Trump regarding payments made to a Playboy model.

Primeau has also been quoted as a notable expert on differentiating & authenticating real audios from generative AI which has proliferated every field, including the legal domain.

== Bibliography ==
Primeau is the author of one self-published book on audio forensics:

- The Art of Production, Primeau Productions, 2008, ISBN 9780967399676

== Documentaries and TV ==
Primeau made appearances in the following TV shows and documentaries:

- The Proof is Out There.
- CNN Newsroom.
- Cuomo Prime Time.
- 20/20.
- Contact.
