= Sigríður J. Friðjónsdóttir =

Director of Public Prosecutions in Iceland

- Born: 28 November 1961 (age 64)
- Education: University of Iceland
- Occupation: Director of Public Prosecutions
- Years active: 2011–present

Sigríður Jóhanna Friðjónsdóttir (born 28 November 1961) is the Director of Public Prosecutions in Iceland.

== Education ==
Sigríður graduated from the University of Iceland in 1986 and studied British litigation law at University College London in 1987.

== Career ==
She became a prosecutor at the Public Prosecutor's Office on 10 August 10 1998 and was named Deputy Public Prosecutor in September 2008. She was appointed Director of Public Prosecutions on 4 April 2011.
