= Sigrid Björkegren =

Sigrid Björkegren (1845–1936), was a Swedish shipowner.

She was born to the mayor of Simrishamn, Folke Kraak, and Catharina Elisabeth Werngren. In 1866, she married the shipowner Johan Daniel Björkegren. They had two daughters and one son. During her marriage, she was an active business partner of her spouse.

She managed the Björkegren Shipping Line after the death of her spouse in 1898 until 1916. It was the biggest sailing shipping line in Sweden at the time. She also took over the Chairmanship of the AB Njord Insurance company.

At the time when she took over the company, the Sailing ships were declining on favor of the Steamboat, and Sigrid Björkegren gradually decreased the sail ships. However the sailing ships in the form of barque experienced a great revival during the Second Boer War, which greatly benefitted her company. World War I created difficulties in the shipping business, and Sigrid Björkegren, who was a pacifist and was deeply affected when one of her ships was sunk with 13 casualties in 1915, chose to discontinue the company despite it still being prosperous at the time, and retire.
