= Women in Iceland =

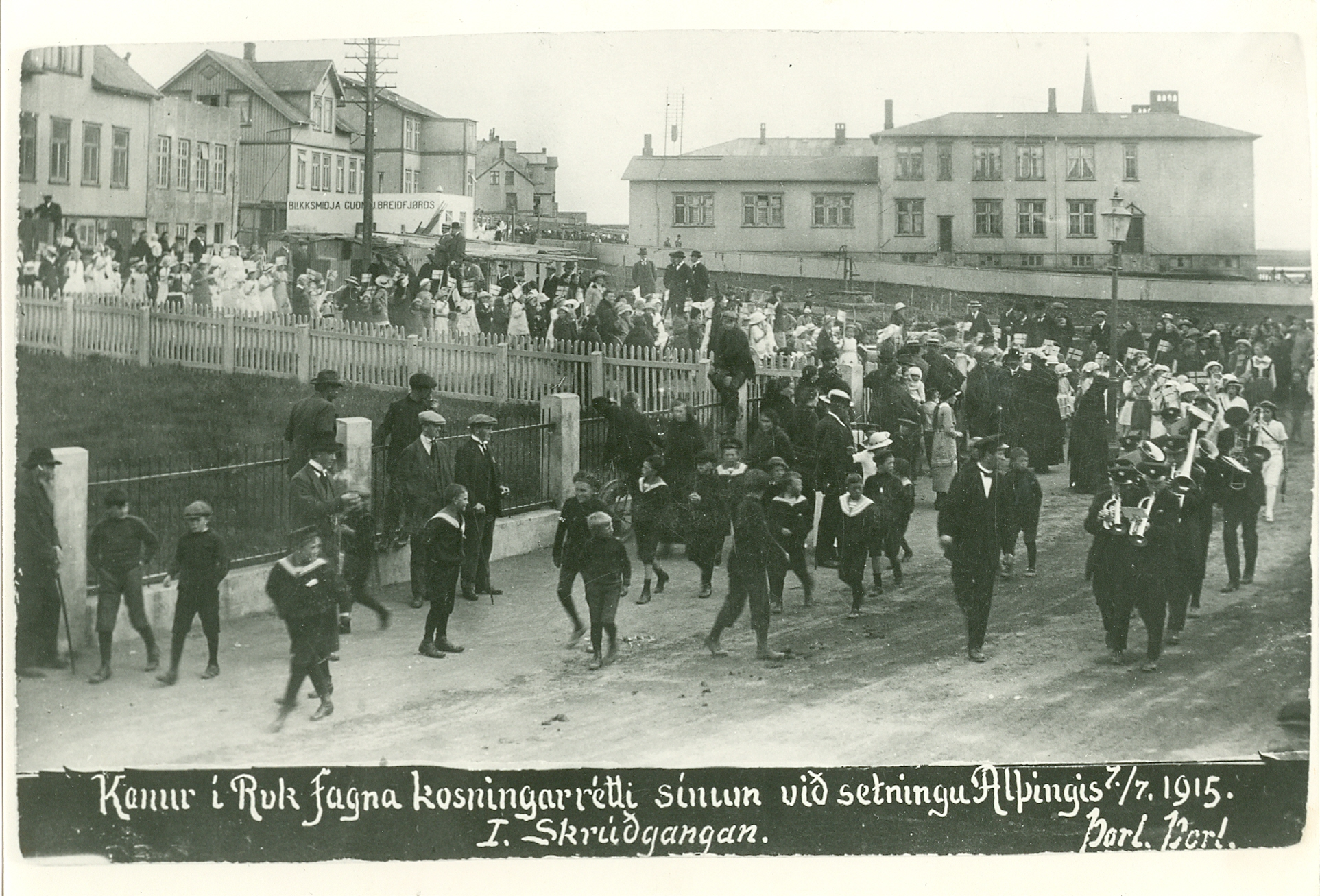
- A procession in Bankastræti in Reykjavík on July 7th 1915 to celebrate women's suffrage.

General statistics
- Maternal mortality (per 100,000): 27
- Women in parliament: 38%
- Women over 25 with secondary education: 99% [M: 99%]
- Women in labour force: 79% [M: 86%]

Gender Inequality Index
- Value: 0.043 (2021)
- Rank: 8th out of 191

Global Gender Gap Index
- Value: 0.908 (2022)
- Rank: 1st out of 146

Women in Iceland generally enjoy good gender equality. As of 2018, 88% of working-age women were employed, 65% of students attending university were female, and 41% of members of parliament were women. Nevertheless, women still earn about 14% less than men, though these statistics do not take into account the hours worked, over-time, and choices of employment. Iceland has the world's highest proportion of women in the labour market and significant child care allocations for working women. It has gender neutral parental leave, with a quota for each parent, and a transferable part.

Iceland is arguably one of the world's most feminist countries, having been awarded this status in 2011 for the second year in a row. Iceland was the first country to have a female president, Vigdís Finnbogadóttir, elected in 1980. It also has the world's first female and openly gay head of government, Jóhanna Sigurðardóttir, who was elected prime minister in 2009.

Iceland enjoys the smallest overall gender gap, according to the World Economic Forum ranking Global Gender Gap Report, a position it has held since 2009. In 2020 Iceland had a 12.2% gap, as measured across four categories: health, education, economic participation and opportunity, and political advancement. The pay gap between women and men is decreasing at a rate which would lead to parity in 2068. Women earn about 72% of men's salaries on average, and are still subject to domestic and sexual violence. Women in Iceland do not necessarily fare better than other countries in professional fields: for example Iceland's percentage of female medical doctors is one of the lowest within the OECD (only Japan, Korea, Luxembourg and the US have less female doctors).

== History ==
=== Viking age (793–1066) ===
==== Age of settlement (c. 870–930) ====
Both Norse men and Norse women colonised England, the Shetland and Orkney Islands, and Iceland during Viking Age migrations from Scandinavia. Norse women journeyed with men as explorers, and later as settlers in the Settlement of Iceland. A large number of women were abducted from Ireland and Great Britain as slaves - more than 60% of modern Icelandic women show Celtic DNA from these slave ancestors. The settler Aud the Deep-Minded was one of the earliest known Icelandic women. She was one of the four main settlers in early Icelandic history. Other notable early Icelanders include the explorer Gudrid Thorbjarnardóttir, the poet Steinunn Refsdóttir, and Thorgerd Egilsdottir wife of Olaf the Peacock. The age of settlement is considered to have ended in the year 930 with the establishment of Alþingi.

==== Early Commonwealth Era ====
During the Viking Age, Norse women worked in farming and commerce alongside men, and were often left in charge while their husbands were away or had been killed. Women's workshops for making woolen textiles have been found in Iceland. Textiles were used as a form of currency in medieval Iceland, and there were regulations as to what was legal tender in the oldest (11th-century) part of the Grágás laws. Iceland exported shaggy cloaks to Europe.

Viking Age society was male-dominated, with defined gender roles. The dead were buried with some of their possessions: men were buried with tools and weapons, women with needlework, jewelry, rings of keys, and household items, although beads have been found in both male and female burials. Graves of this time have been observed to show older women being highly respected, which was shown by their grave including high value items. Foreigners that interacted with Viking women often later wrote about their "independent behaviors." Viking Age women could own their own property, ask for a divorce and were entitled to reclaim their dowries. If a woman's husband died, she would take his place on a permanent basis; in this way, women were often running farms or trading businesses. Many Scandinavian cultures of the time practiced polygamy as well as concubine outside of marriage. The Icelandic Sagas make reference to women acting as nurses and midwives, and attending to the wounds of men injured in battle. Despite the image of female Viking warriors often pushed by stories and media, we can see from artifacts that it was quite typical for Viking women to take care of all the house duties while the men took care of all matters outside the house, similar to many other male- dominated European cultures.

=== Women's suffrage ===
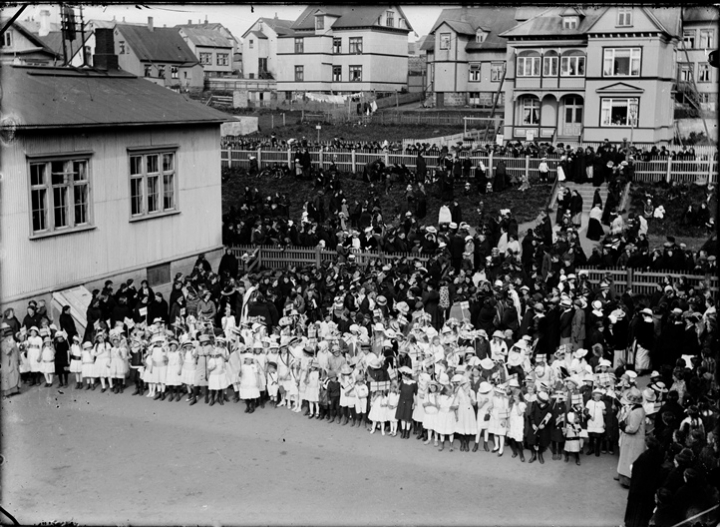
Icelanders celebrating women's suffrage in 1915.

Icelandic women first got the right to vote in parliamentary elections in 1915.

In 1845 the vote was limited to men above a certain age who owned property and paid taxes. These restrictions were lifted over time, and in 1903 all men could vote except farm labourers. In 1907 the right to vote in municipal elections was extended to all women, having been granted to widows and single women of independent means in 1882.

A women's movement organized in the Thorvaldsensfélagið in 1875 and Hið íslenska kvenfélag in 1894, the first women's magazine Framsókn is founded by Ingibjörg Skaptadóttir and Sigríður Þorsteinsdóttir in 1895, and a women's suffrage organisation, the Icelandic Women's Rights Association, was founded by Bríet Bjarnhéðinsdóttir in 1907.

A bill for women's suffrage was agreed on by the Althing in 1911, ratified by the Althing in 1913, and enacted on 19 June 1915 by the Danish king but only granted the vote to women over 40, and did not grant the right to vote to servants. At the time this was around 12,000 Icelandic women. In 1920 these restrictions were lifted after Iceland became an independent state under the Danish crown in 1918.

=== 1975 women's strike ===
It is said that in 1975, women in the workplace made 60% less than their male counterparts. Many were unable to work as they had to stay at home to do the housework and raise the children. On Friday, October 24, women left their formal and informal work at 14:05 (2:05 pm), the time at which they would have earned their day's wage had they been paid at the same average rate as men. The scale of the event was very large, involving 25,000 women in a country with just 220,000 inhabitants. In Reykjavík, almost 90% of the women participated.

The first strike in 1975 affected many things. Many schoolteachers were women, so schools closed or nearly so. The walkout disrupted the telephone service, and halted the printing of newspapers, as the typesetters were all women. Daycares were mostly closed, because the daycare workers were women, so men had to take their children to work. Easy-to-cook meals ran out in many stores, as did sweets and items to distract children. The strike continued until midnight, when women returned to work. The typesetters returned to set newspapers which were almost entirely devoted to the women's strike.

Women achieved their intended goal, basically shutting down Iceland for the day. Men referred to this day as "the Long Friday". Vigdís says she would not have become president without the strike which she said was the "first step for women's emancipation in Iceland", which "completely paralysed the country and opened the eyes of many men". In the year following the strike, Iceland set up the Gender Equality Council, and passed the Gender Equality Act, which prohibited gender discrimination in the workplace and in schools.

=== 21st century ===
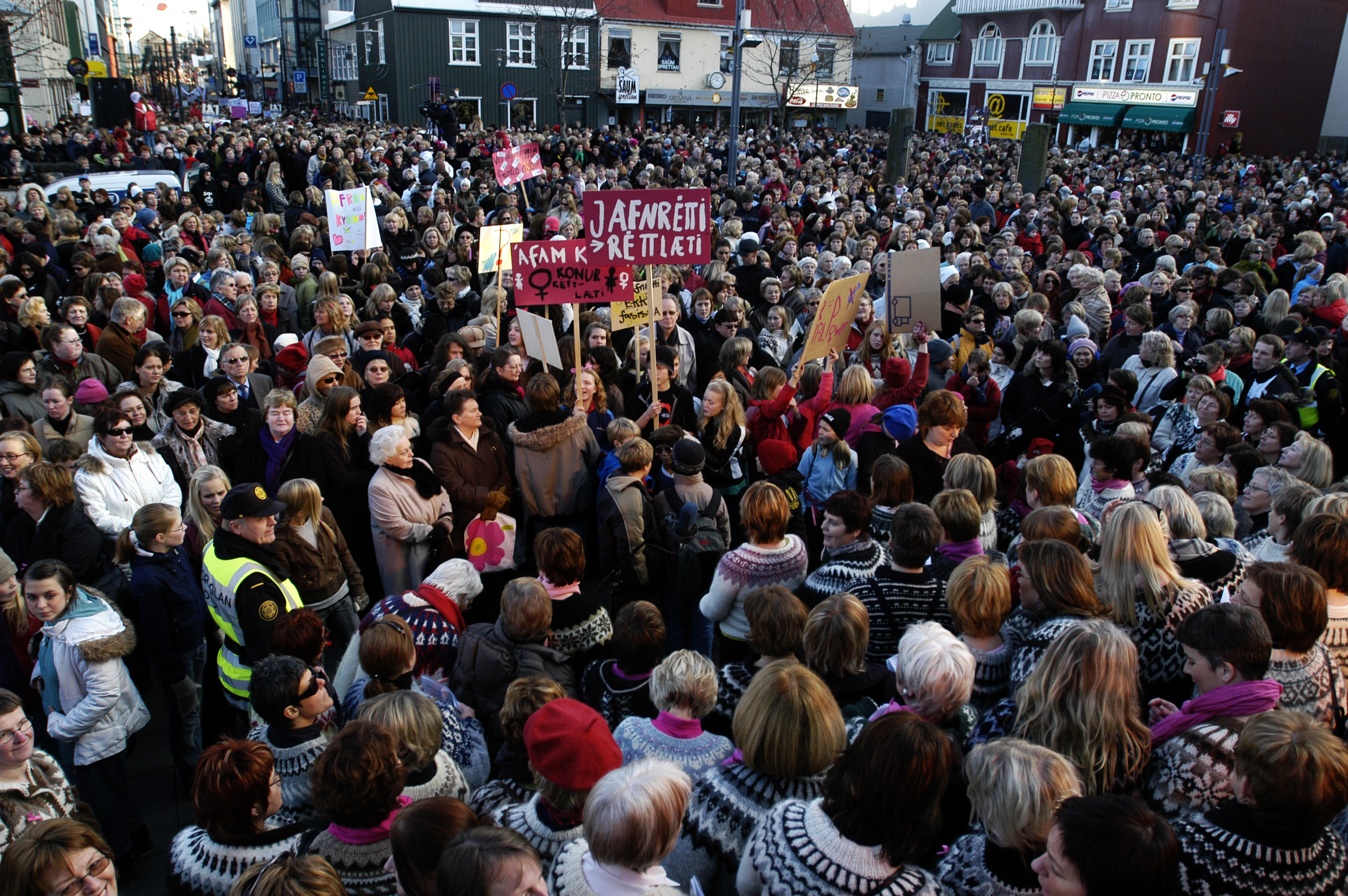
Women protesting in 2005

The strike was repeated; in 1975, 2005, 2010, and 2016 women in Iceland walked out in accordance to the time of day that they would stop being paid if their wage was the same as men. On October 24, 2016, women left work at 2:38 pm, for the 41st anniversary of the original women's day off. This indicated that women have gained only a half an hour more in pay in 11 years, that is slightly less than three minutes per year. The International Women's Strike, a global version inspired by the Icelandic strike, spread in 2017 and 2018.

== Education and employment ==
Thora Melsted opened the first school for girls in the 1850s, and after a public debate concerning women's right to higher education, the Kvennaskólinn í Reykjavík was founded in 1871; women were given the right to attend university in 1886, and the first Icelandic woman to graduate was Camilla Torfason in Copenhagen in 1889 and Elínborg Jacobsen in Iceland in 1897.

45.5% of the Icelandic formal workforce was women in 2010. In the 2000s, just under 80% of Icelandic women were in formal employment, the highest rate in the OECD (about 86% of men were in formal employment). Rates of mothers in work are also high, perhaps due to high childcare coverage and generous parental leave policies. Women were in formal work for an average of 35 hours a week, compared to 44 hours for men. In 2008, 65% of women working were doing so full-time, compared to 90% of men.

14% of Icelandic families have single mothers, while 2% have single fathers. 40% have both parents, while the remainder of families are childless. Among those not in formal employment, a 2010 survey found that 95% of those describing themselves as homemakers were women. The survey also found 1200 people on unpaid family leave, all of them women.

In 1987 Icelandic fathers were given the right to share some of the mother's six month family entitlement. This was enacted due to the passing of similar laws in Norway and Sweden. In 2000, Iceland passed a law for a father's quota; three months of paid leave were reserved for the father, three for the mother, and the remaining three could be used by either parent. This was enacted in stages, with the amount of leave increased each year, being fully implemented in 2003.

After the law was brought in, more than 90% of fathers used their paternal leave. Research found that this put men and women on a more equal footing in the workplace, but did not seem to affect the pay gap. In 2012, there were plans to gradually increase the leave to be five months for each parent, plus two months of transferable leave, by 2016. In 2021, the quota for each parent is 5 months of paid leave, and there are 2 months of shareable paid leave; in addition there is also unpaid leave (13 weeks per parent, non-transferable). Parental leave may start up to one month before the expected date of delivery.

The Icelandic labour market is strongly gender-segregated, with substantial differences in gender ratios in different sectors. Women in Iceland are more likely to get university degrees than men, up to the PhD level. They made up forty percent of tertiary graduates in science, mathematics and computing, and 35% of graduates in engineering, manufacturing, and construction, in 2012/2013. Over 80% of health graduates, and over 70% of veterinary, agricultural, and education graduates, are women. Less than a quarter of those working as plant and machine operators and in crafts and trades, agriculture, fisheries, and management are women (although, against this trend, 60% of managers in the civil society sector are women). Women are more likely to work in the public sector, men in the private sector, which means women's employment is not as strongly affected by economic fluctuations. Women are less likely to get trade and vocational qualifications. Journalists are slightly less likely to be women than men, but less than one in three interviewees in news programs is a woman.

In the wake of the 2008–2011 Icelandic financial crisis, there was a swing towards female leadership. Women had been all but absent from pre-crisis banking boards; after the crisis, they were appointed to the new boards, and two-thirds of the bank managers appointed after nationalization were female. Women were also more successful in running for political office, with the proportion of women in parliament rising to a record 43%.

=== Gender pay gap ===
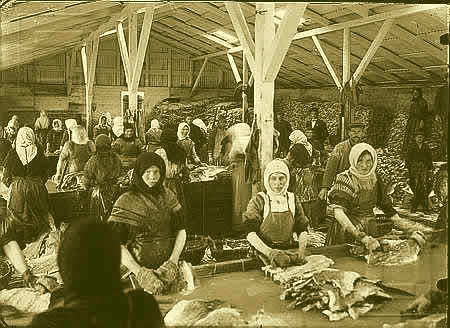
Women working in fish factory in Reykjavík around 1910

Iceland is arguably one of the world's most gender-equal countries. It is listed as number one in the 2016 best places to work by The Economist's women index. It has been named the most feminist country in the world, and has been listed number one on the World Economic Forum gender pay gap index since 2009. For the past eight years "Iceland has finished first of more than a hundred countries in the World Economic Forum’s annual Global Gender Gap ranking, which quantifies disparities between men and women in health, politics, education, and employment (the higher a country’s ranking, the smaller its gender disparities)."

In Iceland women are paid about 18% less than their male counterparts, if working in the same job with the same level of experience; for comparison, the average European wage gap is 16.2%. Excluding ranking, position, and hours worked, the average annual income for women is 28% less than men. In rural areas, the pay gap is generally larger. At the current rate, women will not experience equal pay until 2068. The Icelandic government has said it aims to close the gender pay gap in Iceland by 2022.

In 2018, Iceland made unequal pay for equal work illegal; companies and government agencies with over 25 employees face heavy fines.

== Government ==
Iceland became the third modern democratic country in which women gained the vote in 1915. However, by 1975, there were only three parliamentarians (5% of all parliamentarians), and there had only been nine female parliamentarians in total. Other Nordic countries had 16–23%. After the 1975 Icelandic women's strike, more women were elected. In 2015, 28 parliamentarians (44%) were female.

Iceland has had a woman as either president or prime minister for 20 of the last 36 years. In the 2016 parliamentary election covering 63 seats, 30 women were elected, increasing the number of females in the Alþingi to over 47%. Compared to the United States which sits at twenty percent, Iceland was said to have the "most equal parliament" in the world when women won 48% of the seats in 2016.

=== Vigdís Finnbogadóttir ===
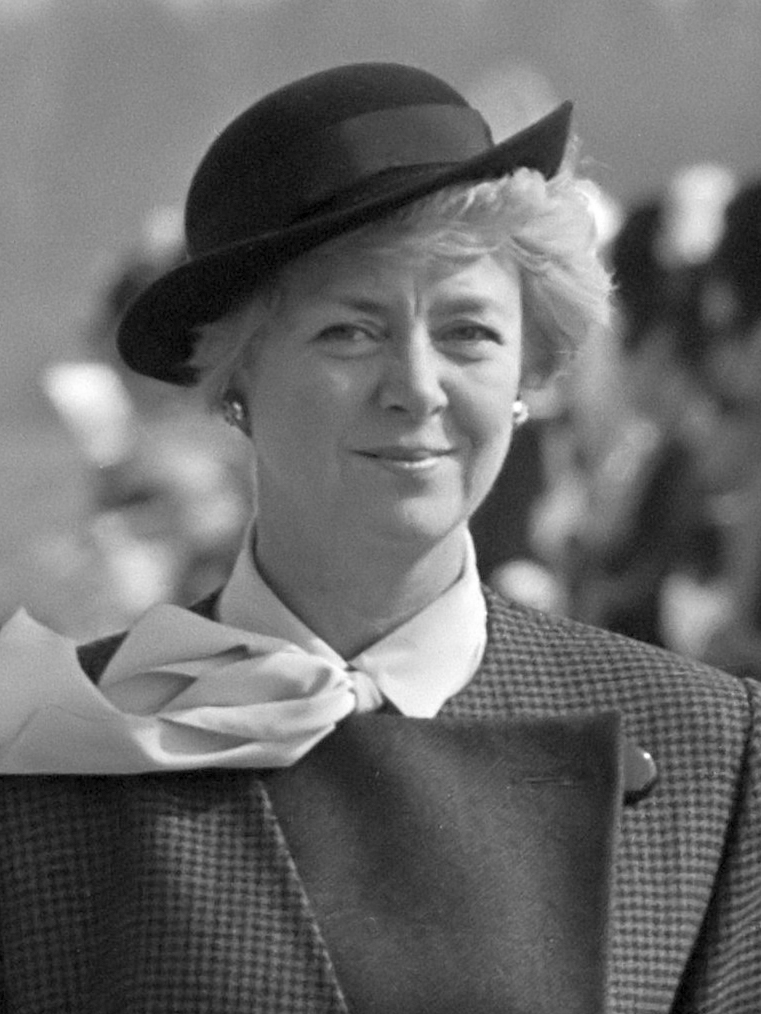
Vigdís Finnbogadóttir

On June 29, 1980 Vigdís Finnbogadóttir was voted in as the first female president of Iceland, and just the third president of the republic. She was the first woman to be elected head of state in a national election, and the world's first democratically elected female president. After becoming president without opposition in 1984, 1988, and 1992, she retired from the presidency in 1996. Vigdis also was an artistic Director of the Reykjavík Theatre Company, she was a teacher of French at the University of Iceland, and was the press officer at the National Theatre of Iceland (1954-1957 and 1961–1964). She broadcast lectures on local television, and trained local tour guides.

During her time as president she used her position to focus on youth and to support forestry, while promoting Icelandic language and culture. After her retirement as president in 1996, Vigdis went on to become "founding chair of the Council of Women World Leaders at the John F. Kennedy School of Government at Harvard University". Two years later, in 1998, she was appointed president of the Unesco World Commission on the Ethics of Scientific Knowledge and Technology.

=== Jóhanna Sigurðardóttir ===
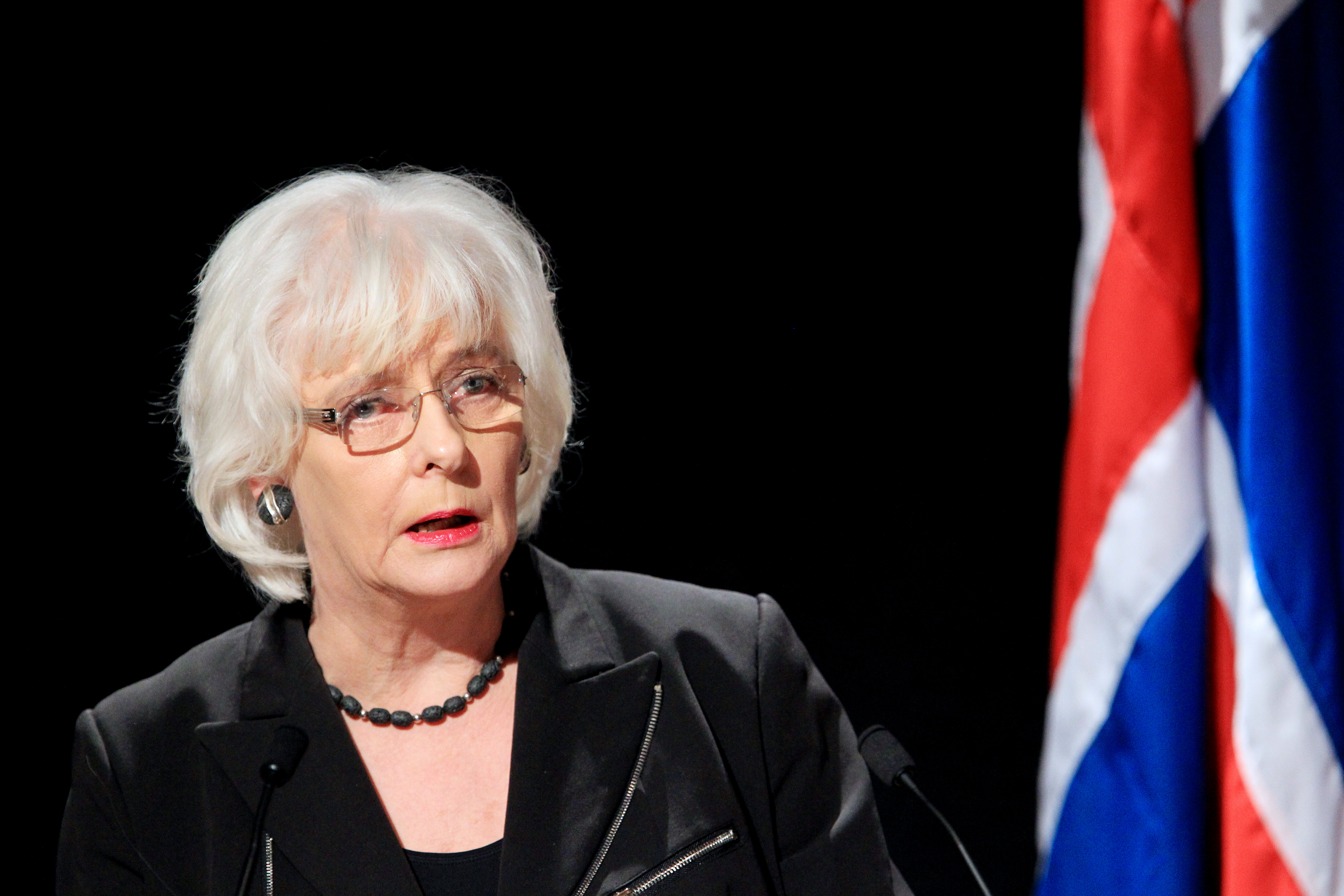
Jóhanna Sigurðardóttir

In 2003 Jóhanna Sigurðardóttir was elected as the first female Prime Minister of Iceland as well as the world's first openly lesbian head of government. She held that position for 16 years and used her leadership to attempt to ban strip clubs "explaining it as a necessary measure to bring about justice, which is impossible, as she concluded, when women are treated like commodities". Before this Jóhanna Sigurðardóttir was already a very active member of government. In 1978 she was elected into the Althing as a member of the Social Democratic Party. She became minister of social affairs in 1987, a position she held until 1994. She started her own party in 1994 called National Movement, which joined with the Social Democratic Party, Women’s Alliance and the People’s Alliance in 1999, and in 2000 merged to become the Social Democratic Alliance. On June 27, 2010, Iceland declared same-sex marriage legal, and Jóhanna and her partner Jónína Leósdóttir were officially married.

=== Katrín Jakobsdóttir ===
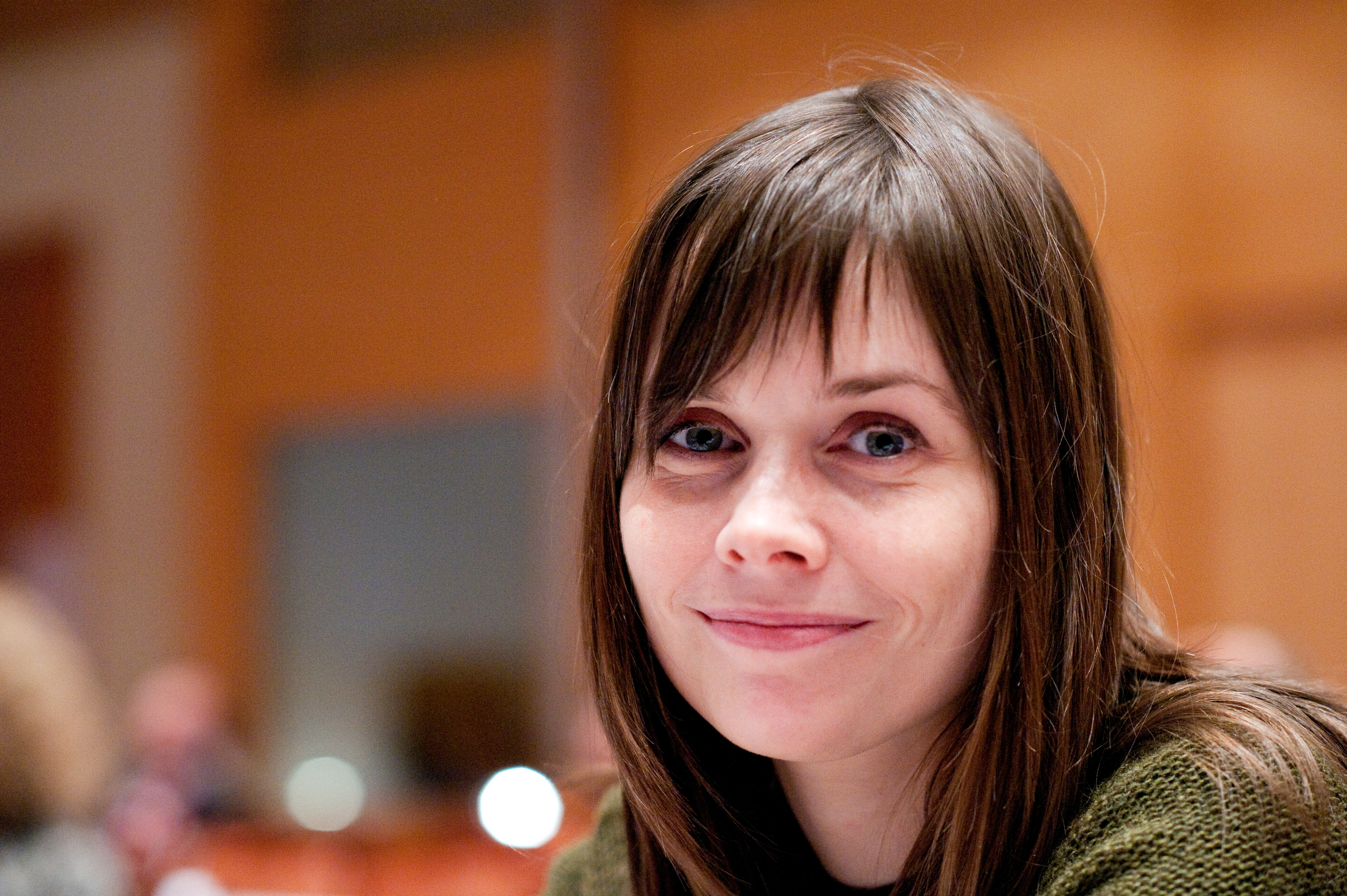
Katrín Jakobsdóttir

Katrín Jakobsdóttir, a member of the left-leaning Left-Green Movement, became Iceland's second female prime minister. One of her actions as prime minister was to organise a new law which requires Icelandic companies to demonstrate that they pay men and women equally. Katrín is the youngest female leader in Europe. She became a member of the Althing aged 31, the Minister of Education, Science and Culture at 33, and the leader of the Left-Green Movement at 37.

== Religion ==
Before the Icelandic Reformation, Iceland had two convents for women: Kirkjubæjar Abbey and Reynistaðarklaustur. The Church of Iceland, Iceland's established church, elected its first female bishop, Agnes M. Sigurðardóttir, in 2012.

== Sport ==
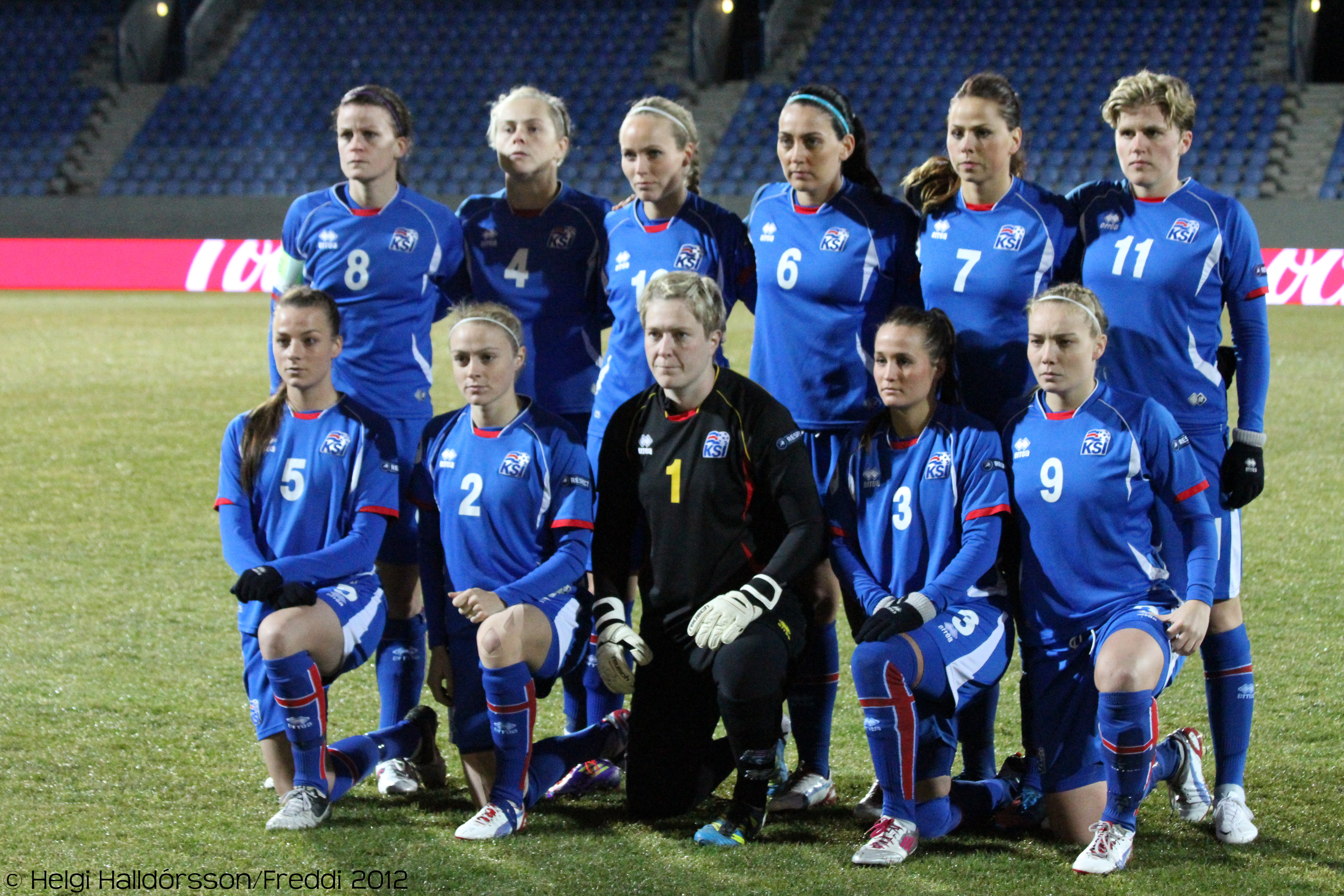
Iceland women's national football team in 2012

Iceland has national women's teams for basketball, handball, volleyball, and the women's national football team which represents Iceland in international women's football.

Women's football clubs in Iceland include Breiðablik, Grindavík, Haukar, Íþróttabandalag Vestmannaeyja, Knattspyrnufélag Reykjavíkur, Stjarnan, and Valur. The Úrvalsdeild kvenna is the top-tier women's football league in Iceland. It features 10 teams that play a double round robin to decide the champion, which qualifies for a spot in the UEFA Women's Champions League. The 2018 champion was Breiðablik.

The women's national football team has successfully qualified for and competed in the UEFA Women's Championship's in 2009, 2013, and 2017.

== Music ==
Iceland has a large number of world-renowned women musicians. These include Björk Guðmundsdóttir, who achieved global fame with The Sugarcubes and later as a solo artist. In the classical genre, leading composers include Anna Þorvaldsdóttir and Bára Gísladóttir. The first Icelandic university-trained woman composer was Jórunn Viðar, who studied at the Juilliard School and wrote her first works in the 1940s. Before that, several women had written songs but none of them worked professionally. Another important composer of a later generation is Karólína Eiríksdóttir.

== See also ==
- Baugrygr (unmarried female head of family in Norse society)
- Human rights in Iceland
- Icelandic women by century
- Women in Europe
