= Powers of Darkness (Iceland) =

Early Icelandic version of Dracula

Makt Myrkranna (Powers of Darkness)
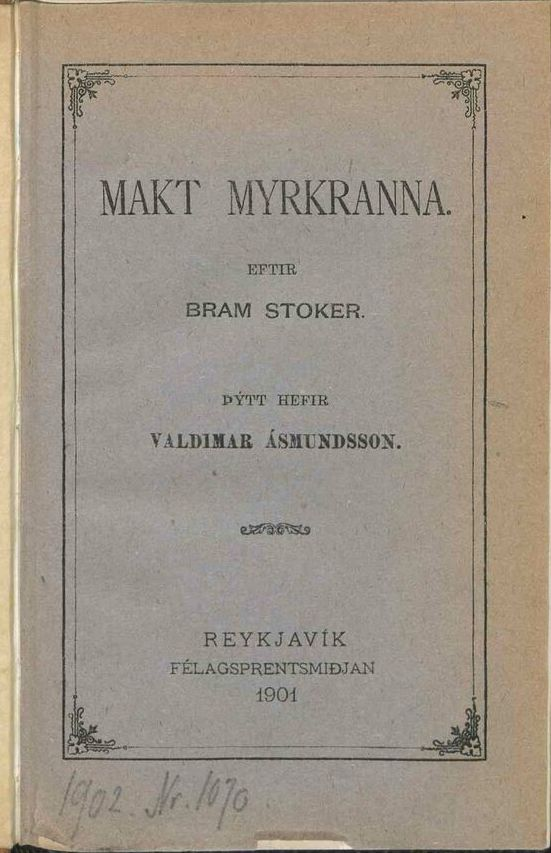
- The title page of the 1901 printing
- Author: Bram Stoker, Valdimar Ásmundsson (translator, adaptation)
- Language: Icelandic
- Genre: Horror, Gothic
- Publication date: Serialised 1900–1901; book 1901
- Publication place: Iceland
- Pages: 210

Powers of Darkness (Icelandic: Makt myrkranna) is an Icelandic gothic horror novel by Valdimar Ásmundsson serialised in 1900–1901 that claims to be a translation of the English-language novel Dracula by Bram Stoker. Instead, it was in fact based on an earlier Swedish adaptation of Dracula, even with the same title — Mörkrets makter ("Powers of Darkness"), by "A—e", specifically the shortened version. Both adaptations differ significantly from Dracula, and are believed to have used an early draft of Stoker's novel as partial basis for the translation.

== Makt myrkranna ==
From January 1900 to March 1901, Dracula was serialized in the Reykjavík newspaper Fjallkonan (Lady of the Mountain) under the title Makt myrkranna (Powers of Darkness). Valdimar, credited as the Icelandic translator, was the husband of Bríet Bjarnhéðinsdóttir, the editor of Fjallkonan at the time. In 1901, Valdimar published Makt myrkranna in Reykjavík with the publisher being listed only as Nokkrir Prentarar ("various publishers"). It remains unknown who actually published the book. Part one of Makt myrkranna, consisting of pages 5–167, concerns the visit of Thomas Harker (as Jonathan Harker is renamed here) at Castle Dracula in Transylvania while part two, consisting of pages 168–210, concerns the rest of Dracula. Included in Makt myrkranna was a preface that claimed to be written by Stoker dated August 1898, more than a year after the publication of Dracula in England in May 1897.

== Author's preface ==
The author's preface (Icelandic: Formáli höfundarins) claims that the novel is based upon a "mysterious manuscript" and the events of Dracula were in fact real with the names of the characters changed only to protect their privacy. The preface was ignored by international scholarship until 1986, when the scholar Richard Dalby discovered it and translated it into English. The preface to Makt myrkranna had been quoted in articles but had never been included in any of the English editions of Dracula before 2017. The preface describes the murders committed by Jack the Ripper (in the preface: Jakobs kviðristara) between 1888 and 1891 as having happened within "the public's memory". Dalby's translation compares these to the work of another criminal who "came into the story a little later". Hans de Roos's translation reverses the order of these events: "This series of crimes ... created ... as much horror ... as the infamous murders by Jack the Ripper which occurred a short time later." Later in the story, the Count mentions "slaughtered women found in sacks, drifting in the Thames," an allusion to the Thames Torso Murders between 1887 and 1889.

The author's preface reads:

The reader of this story will very soon understand how the events outlined in these pages have been gradually drawn together to make a logical whole. Apart from excising minor details which I consider unnecessary, I have let the people involved relate their experiences in their own way; but for obvious reasons I have changed the names of the people and places concerned. In all other respects, I leave the manuscript unaltered, in deference of the wishes of those who have considered it their duty to present it before the eyes of the public.

I am quite convinced that there is no doubt whatever that the events described really took place, however unbelievable and incomprehensible they might appear at first sight.

And I am further convinced that they must always remain to some extent incomprehensible, although continuing research in psychology and natural sciences may, in years to come, give logical explanations of such strange happenings which, at present, neither scientists nor the secret police can understand.

... Various people's minds will go back to the remarkable group of foreigners who for many seasons together played a dazzling part in the life of the aristocracy here in London; and some will remember that one of them disappeared suddenly without apparent reason, leaving no trace.

All the people who having willingly — or unwillingly — played a part in this remarkable story are known generally and well respected. Both Jonathan Harker and his wife (who is a woman of character) and Dr. Seward are my friends and have been so for many years, and I have never doubted that they were telling the truth; and the highly respected scientist, who appears here under a pseudonym, will also be famous all over the educated world for his real name, which I have not desired to specify, to be hidden from people — least of all those who have from experience learnt to value and respect his genius and his accomplishments, though they adhere to his views of life no more than I. But in our times, it ought to be clear to all serious-thinking men that "there are more things in heaven and earth/ than are dreamt of in your philosophy." London, August 1898."

== Reception of Makt myrkranna in Iceland ==
In Iceland, Makt myrkranna received only one contemporary review—and it was negative. In 1906, Benedikt Björnsson (1879–1941) wrote:

Without doubt, for the largest part it is worthless rubbish and sometimes even worse than worthless, completely devoid of poetry and beauty and far removed from any psychological truth. "FJallkonan" presented various kinds of garbage, including a long story, "Powers of Darkness". That story would have been better left unwritten, and I cannot see that such nonsense has enriched our literature.

Benedikt was of a younger generation than Valdimar and feared that the translation of "cheap" sensational fiction from abroad might replace Iceland's own literary production, including his.

Despite the lack of positive reviews, Makt myrkranna became a household name in Iceland after Dracula with Bela Lugosi (1931) had been shown in a Reykjavík cinema in 1932, becoming the generic name for a whole series of vampire movies.

The Icelandic Nobel Prize Laureate Halldór Laxness (1902–1998) was heavily impressed by the Icelandic edition of Dracula: "And do not forget Makt myrkranna (Bram Stoker) with the famous un-dead Count Dracula in the Carpathians, who was not less popular than today; one of the best pens of the country was engaged to translate the novel: Valdimar Ásmundsson." It has been suggested that Halldór's own novel Kristnihald undir Jökli (1968) was based on Makt myrkranna. (Note: In his unpublished manuscript on the publication history of Makt myrkranna (2016), de Roos extensively discussed Bjarnason's article and mentioned further parallels between Laxness's novel and Makt myrkranna, which Bjarnason believed to be a condensed version of Dracula. In fact, Kristnihald undir Jökli is hardly related to Stoker's original; the parallels mentioned by Bjarnason result from the Nordic modifications. Further information can be obtained from Hans de Roos. Archived 7 August 2021 at the Wayback Machine)

The buzz around the 2017 English translation by De Roos has also sparked new interest in the novel in Iceland.

== Discovery ==
In 2014, the Dutch scholar Hans Corneel de Roos first noticed that the Icelandic version of Dracula was in fact not a translation, but was rather a very different novel from Stoker's version. In 2017, De Roos translated Makt myrkranna into English under the title Powers of Darkness: The Lost Version of Dracula. The discovery of the differences between the novels sparked much debate, with three theories being offered for the discrepancies:

- Valdimar changed the story of Dracula as he translated it into Icelandic.
- Stoker provided Valdimar with a first draft of Dracula that he chose not to use for the version that was published in 1897. Supporting the "first draft theory" is the fact that Stoker's widow had an obsession for suing people who used Dracula without her permission, yet Valdimar was never sued despite the differences between Makt myrkranna and Dracula.
- A synthesis view holds that Makt myrkranna is the result of both Valdimar's changes to the book and the use of a rejected first draft of Dracula.

== Differences between Dracula and Makt myrkranna ==
The plot of Makt myrkranna is essentially the same as Dracula, though the differences between Dracula and Makt myrkranna have been much commented upon. Many of the characters had different names, the book was shorter, and there was much more emphasis on the characters' sexuality in Makt myrkranna. De Roos wrote: "Although Dracula received positive reviews in most newspapers of the day ... the original novel can be tedious and meandering .... Powers of Darkness, by contrast, is written in a concise, punchy style; each scene adds to the progress of the plot." In Dracula, Stoker has the count speak favorably of the Viking berserkers from Iceland as bloodthirsty warriors who were the terror of Europe, Asia and Africa, which Valdimar removed. Stoker also gave Dracula the ability to shape-shift into any animal he pleased, which Valdimar removed, even though the inspiration for this power of Dracula's came from Icelandic folklore, which Stoker had learned about from reading The Book of Were-Wolves by Sabine Baring-Gould, who had lived in Iceland for a time.

Despite the fact that the author's preface spoke of his "friend" Jonathan Harker, in Makt myrkranna, he is called Thomas Harker. Mina Harker becomes Wilma Harker and Lucy Westenra is renamed Lucy Western. Only Count Dracula is not renamed. Wilma Harker is described as having gone to Vienna to be treated by Dr. Sigmund Freud, an aspect of her background story that does not appear in Dracula. Dracula is an epistolary novel; by contrast Makt myrkranna has an omniscient narrator in part two. The American novelist Colin Fleming has argued that the frequent references to Norse mythology and Scandinavian literature in Makt myrkranna were Valdimar's contribution to the story rather than Stoker's. Fleming noted that in Dracula, Stoker worked in subtle sexual references to serve as metaphors for "... deeper, dark concepts: the idea of an antichrist, the blood-sucking serving as a compelling, hellish inversion of communion. Makt myrkranna, conversely, could have had the subtitle Lust in a Cape". In Makt myrkranna, Harker has an obsession with breasts as he speaks frequently of the "bosom" of various women he encounters in Transylvania.

One of the principal differences between Dracula and Makt myrkranna is that the bulk of the latter concerns Harker's stay at Castle Dracula while the story that makes up the majority of Dracula appears only in a very abridged form. Harker's visit to Transylvania takes up 80% of Makt myrkranna. In a review, the Canadian novelist Michael Melgaard described Makt myrkranna as being more of a "slow burn" because Harker takes much more time to realize that he is Dracula's prisoner. By contrast, in Dracula, he realizes almost immediately that he is a prisoner. Harker's experiences at Castle Dracula are more visceral and intense in Makt myrkranna. For an example, in Dracula, Harker finds the ruins of a chapel that he describes as having "evidently been used as a graveyard," which becomes a room full of rotting corpses and occult markings in Makt myrkranna. Other experiences for Harker not found in Dracula include finding the body of a dead peasant girl killed by Dracula and watching the Count perform a black mass that ends in human sacrifice.

Lord Arthur Holmwood in Makt myrkranna has a sister named Mary who does not appear in Dracula. The Brides of Dracula do not appear in Makt myrkranna; Dracula has only one female companion, the beautiful and alluring Josephine. One of the heroes of Dracula, Dr. John Seward, goes insane in Makt myrkranna as a result of the horrors Dracula committed. Seward's deranged patient, Renfield, does not appear in Makt myrkranna. Dracula is more developed as a character in Makt myrkranna and is in contact with various governments in what is hinted at is a bid for world domination. In Makt myrkranna, Dracula displays strong Nietzschean tendencies as he speaks of his contempt for Christianity for venerating the weak instead of the strong, and declares his intention is to make the entire world "bow before the strong ones". Social Darwinism was a popular ideology in the 1890s, and much of the rhetoric Dracula uses in Makt myrkranna reflects Social Darwinist themes, as he repeatedly declares his contempt for the weak who exist only to serve the strong—in this case literally as Dracula and his fellow vampires live off the blood of humans too weak to defend themselves. In Makt myrkranna, Dracula does not flee back to Transylvania, but he is instead killed at his London home by a band of heroes led by Dr. Van Helsing.

In Makt myrkranna, there is a Sherlock Holmes-like detective named Inspector Barrington, who does not appear in Dracula, who investigates the murders Dracula committed. In Makt myrkranna, Dracula comes to England not alone, but rather with a deaf-dumb woman who is apparently his slave, and another beautiful aristocratic female vampire, Josephine, who flaunts her sexuality. Josephine is described as having her "neck and upper chest revealed" while wearing a "necklace of glittering diamonds", whom Harker finds "something indecent" about, despite his evident attraction to her. Most notably, Dracula lives not in an estate in the Essex countryside, but rather in a decaying old mansion in London's East End. The British scholar Clive Bloom noted that, when Stoker first started writing the novel that became Dracula, he envisioned Dracula's English residence as a mansion in the East End that had seen better days, and only changed Dracula's English home to a genteel mansion in the countryside in the final draft of Dracula that was written in early 1897. Bloom has argued that the fact that Makt myrkranna's Dracula lives in a decayed London mansion, entirely consistent with Stoker's original vision, strongly suggests that Makt myrkranna is based upon an early draft of the novel.

Stoker's biographer, David J. Skal, has likewise argued that Valdimar based his translation upon an abandoned early draft of Dracula, indicating that Stoker's notes while he was writing Dracula showed that he envisioned Inspector Barrington as one of the book's heroes, only to eliminate him later on as he assigned his role in the plot to Dr. Abraham Van Helsing. Since Inspector Barrington is not a character in Dracula, Valdimar could have not have known of him, which proves he was indeed using an early draft of Dracula as his source, which he obtained either directly or indirectly via the Mörkrets makter serialization. Stoker's notes show that he envisioned Dracula as a having a mute-deaf female housekeeper slave who did not make the final cut into Dracula, but who appears as a character in Makt myrkranna, which is further evidence that Makt myrkranna's source material was an early draft. Likewise, Stoker's notes show that he wanted Dracula to be always the last guest to arrive at a dinner party, a personality trait he displays in Makt myrkranna, but not in Dracula, which also supports the "first draft theory".

== Crowdsourced translation ==
As De Roos did not speak Icelandic when he discovered the complete text of Makt myrkranna, he split the text in 25 parts of around 2,000 words each and set up a team of Icelandic native speakers, who translated these sections to English: Aldís Birna Björnsdottir, Anja Kokoschka, Arna Sif Thorgeirsdottir, Ásdís Rut Guðmundsdóttir, Hafrún Kolbeinsdóttir, Ingibjörg Bragadóttir, Hans Ágústsson, Herbert Pedersen, Hildur Lofts, Hjörtur Jónasson, Lára Kristín Pedersen, María Skúladóttir, Sigrún Birta Kristinsdóttir, Sigrún Ósk Stefánsdóttir, Sædís Alda Karlsdóttir, Tinna María Ólafsdóttir, Vilborg Halldórsdóttir, and Vildís Hallsdóttir. After checking the results of the first round, De Roos organized a second one, then collected the remaining translation problems, which he resolved with the help of further volunteers, the Cleasby & Vigfusson Old Norse to English Dictionary and the Árni Magnússon Institute for Icelandic Studies. Pienette Coetzee and Lounette Loubser helped give the English result a native English flow. Further rounds of editing followed with the help of Allison Devereux and John Edgar Browning. In this sense, this was an example of a crowd-sourced translation. In each stage, however, De Roos had the final say.

== Latest developments ==
De Roos's translation of Makt myrkranna into English was published in February 2017. The publication led the Swedish scholar Rickard Berghorn to point out that much of Makt myrkranna is based upon the Mörkrets makter serialization in Dagen in 1899–1900. De Roos told the Icelandic journalist Anna Margrét Björnsson:

No one saw it coming. Neither my research colleagues nor my publisher nor my friend Simone Berni from Italy, who is a specialist for the early translations of Dracula. For more than a hundred years, Makt myrkranna, the Icelandic adaptation of Dracula, has not been known outside of Iceland, except for the preface apparently authored by Bram Stoker himself. Evidently, those in Iceland who were familiar with Valdimar Ásmundsson's modifications, did not recognize their significance for Dracula Studies in the UK or in the US. And the other way round, English-speaking researchers never cared to try and read the Icelandic text. I had to learn Icelandic, only to get to the gist of the matter. Now it turns out that the same has been happening in Sweden. Several Swedish experts already were familiar with an early version of Dracula, that has been serialized in the Swedish newspapers Dagen and Aftonbladet from 10 June 1899 on. But no one ever paid attention to it, until Rickard Berghorn read about my English translation of Makt myrkranna and realized that this—still older—Swedish version bore an identical title. Mörkrets makter, as is the title of the Swedish serialization, means exactly the same as Makt myrkranna: Powers of Darkness. That is how he made the link between the Swedish and the Icelandic version. First he assumed that Makt myrkranna would be a straight translation of the Swedish publication, but then he found out that the Swedish text is more complete and contains scenes neither described in Dracula nor in Makt myrkranna. And the madman Renfield is still in the story, among others."

De Roos stated that Berghorn's discovery has changed the focus of his research, as it would now be necessary to examine the relationship between Stoker and Harald Sohlman, the editor of Dagen and Aftonbladet, adding he was "... again assuming that Stoker had a hand himself in creating this more erotic and more political version. Rickard, at least, believes so".

== Articles and books ==
- Ásmundsson, Valdimar & Stoker, Bram: Makt Myrkranna (Icelandic) Reykjavík Nokkrir Prentrar (Various printers). 1901. (Text at Project Runeberg.)
- Berni, Simone (2016). Dracula by Bram Stoker The Mystery of The Early Editions. Morrisville: Lulu. ISBN 978-1-32662-179-7.
- Bloom, Clive (2017). "Dracula and the Psychic World of the East End of London". In Marius-Mircea Crișan (ed.). Dracula: An International Perspective'. New York: Springer. pp. 119–139. ISBN 978-3-319-63366-4.
- Crișan, Marius-Mircea: "'Welcome to My House: Enter Freely of your own will': Dracula in International Contexts", pages 1–21 in Dracula: An International Perspective. New York: Springer, 2017. ISBN 978-3-319-63366-4.
- De Roos, Hans Corneel: "Count Dracula's Address and Lifetime Identity" pages 95–118 from Dracula: An International Perspective, New York: Springer, 2017. ISBN 978-3-319-63366-4.
- Skal, David (2016). Something in the Blood: The Untold Story of Bram Stoker, the Man Who Wrote Dracula. New York: Liveright. ISBN 978-1631490101.
- Stoker, Bram & Asmundsson, Valdimar. Hans Corneel de Roos, ed.: Powers of Darkness: the Lost Version of Dracula. New York: The Overlook Press 2017. ISBN 978-1-4683-1336-9
