= Power of Darkness (disambiguation) =

The Power of Darkness is an 1886 play by Leo Tolstoy.

Power of Darkness or Powers of Darkness may also refer to:

- The Power of Darkness (1909 film), silent Russian film directed by Pyotr Chardynin based on the play
- The Power of Darkness (1924 film), silent German film directed by Conrad Wiene based on the play
- The Power of Darkness (1979 film), Argentine film directed by Mario Sábato
- Power of Darkness, an album by Two Steps from Hell
- Powers of Darkness, the Swedish adaptation of Dracula
- Powers of Darkness (Iceland), the Icelandic version of the Swedish adaptation of Dracula
- "Powers of Darkness", an episode of Swamp Thing TV series
