= Katrín Magnússon =

Icelandic feminist (1858–1932)

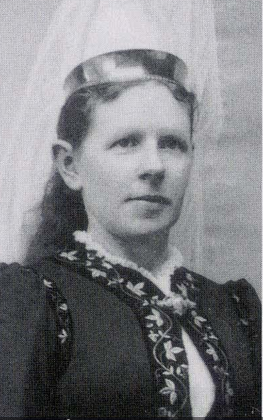
Katrín Magnússon

Katrín Sigríður Skúladóttir Magnússon (1858–1932) was an early Icelandic feminist who played an important part in promoting women's voting rights and women's education in the late 19th century. She served as a municipal councillor of Reykjavík from 1908 to 1916.

== Biography ==
Born on 18 March 1858 on the island of Hrappsey in north-western Iceland, Katrín Sigríður Skúladóttir was the daughter of Skúli Þorvaldsson Sívertsson, a farmer, and his wife Hlíf Jónsdóttir. Raised on Hrappsey, she first went to Reykjavík when she was 14 to visit her paternal aunt, Katrínar Sívertsen. There she met Guðmundur Magnusson, a physician and academic, who was a relative of Katrínar's husband, Jóni Árnasyn. She married Guðmundur in 1891 and they moved to Copenhagen. They returned to Iceland the following year, settling in Sauðárkrókur after her husband received an appointment at the hospital in Skagafjörður. Kartrín was also interested in medical work but the only training open to women in the healthcare field was for midwives, which she did not find attractive. She nevertheless constantly helped her husband, sometimes taking care of his patients.

Katrín became active in social affairs, especially in connection with women's organizations. She joined the Icelandic Women's Association (Íslenska kvenfélag) which she chaired from 1903 to 1924. In 1917, she helped to establish the Women's Alliance (Bandalags kvenna). She also served on the board of Thorvaldsensfélag (the Thorvaldsen Association), Iceland's oldest women's organization established in 1875. Interested in education, she participated in the school committee at Reyhjavik's Kvennaskólan (Women's School). Katrín was one of four elected women who sat on Reykjavík's municipal council from 1908 to 1916, the other three being Bríet Bjarnhéðinsdóttir, Guðrún Björnsdóttir and Þórunn Jónassen.

Katrín Magnússon died in Reykjavík on 13 July 1932.
