= Icelandic Women's Rights Association =

Icelandic women's rights organization

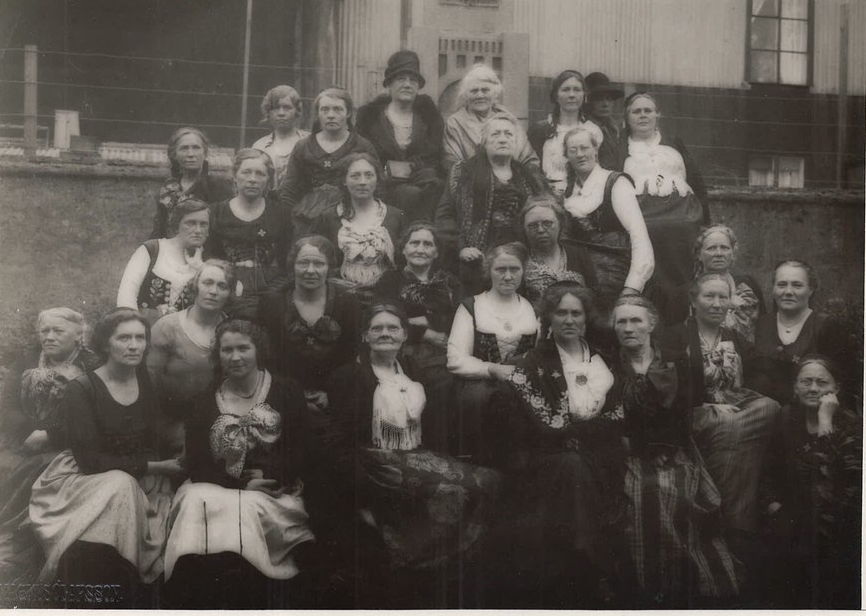
Early photograph of the Association's members

The Icelandic Women's Rights Association (Icelandic: Kvenréttindafélag Íslands) is the largest women's rights organization in Iceland and works for "women’s rights and the equal status of all genders in all areas of society." The association stands for an inclusive, intersectional and progressive liberal feminism, and advocates for women's rights and LGBT rights. It notes that "IWRA works for the rights of all women. Feminism without trans women is no feminism at all." It is a member of the International Alliance of Women (IAW) alongside other Nordic women's rights NGOs such as the Norwegian Association for Women's Rights, the Fredrika Bremer Association and the Danish Women's Society. In IAW contexts it is sometimes known as IAW Iceland.

== History and views ==
It was founded in 1907 by Bríet Bjarnhéðinsdóttir, who served as its president for its first 20 years. The principal aim was to ensure that women received full political equality with men, the right to vote and the same right to employment as men. The Icelandic Women's Association had been established in 1895, but it was concerned only with rights for women in education and economic affairs. Bjarnhéðinsdóttir invited the Women's Association to take on the all-important matter of suffrage but when they refused, she founded the Women's Rights Association, stating that the one most important thing was "political rights, women's suffrage and women's eligibility in politics".

The Association achieved early success in 1908 when four women Bríet Bjarnhéðinsdóttir, Katrín Magnússon, Guðrún Björnsdóttir, and Þórunn Jónassen; were elected to the city council of Reykjavík. In 1911, women received the same treatment as men in education and by 1920, they received equal suffrage rights in parliamentary elections. The organization later became non-partisan, supporting women's rights to jobs and in public life.

The association became a member of the International Alliance of Women in 1907 and of the now defunct Joint Organization of Nordic Women's Rights Associations in 1916, and cooperates closely with its Nordic sister organizations, including the Norwegian Association for Women's Rights, the Fredrika Bremer Association and the Danish Women's Society.

The Icelandic Women's Rights Association advocates trans-inclusive policies, and has stated that "IWRA works for the rights of all women. Feminism without trans women is no feminism at all." On Women's Rights Day in Iceland in 2020, the Icelandic Women's Rights Association organised an event together with Trans Ísland that saw several different feminist organisations in the country discuss strategies to stop anti-trans sentiment from increasing its influence in Iceland. Later that year, Trans Ísland was unanimously granted status as a member association of the Icelandic Women's Rights Association. In 2021 the Icelandic Women's Rights Association, noting the traditional sense of solidarity between the women’s movement and LGBTQ+ movement, organized an event on how the women's movement could counter "anti-trans voices [that] are becoming ever louder and [that] are threatening feminist solidarity across borders."

== Leadership ==
The current president is Tatjana Latinovic.
