= Powers of Darkness =

Swedish Dracula variant serialized in 1899–1900

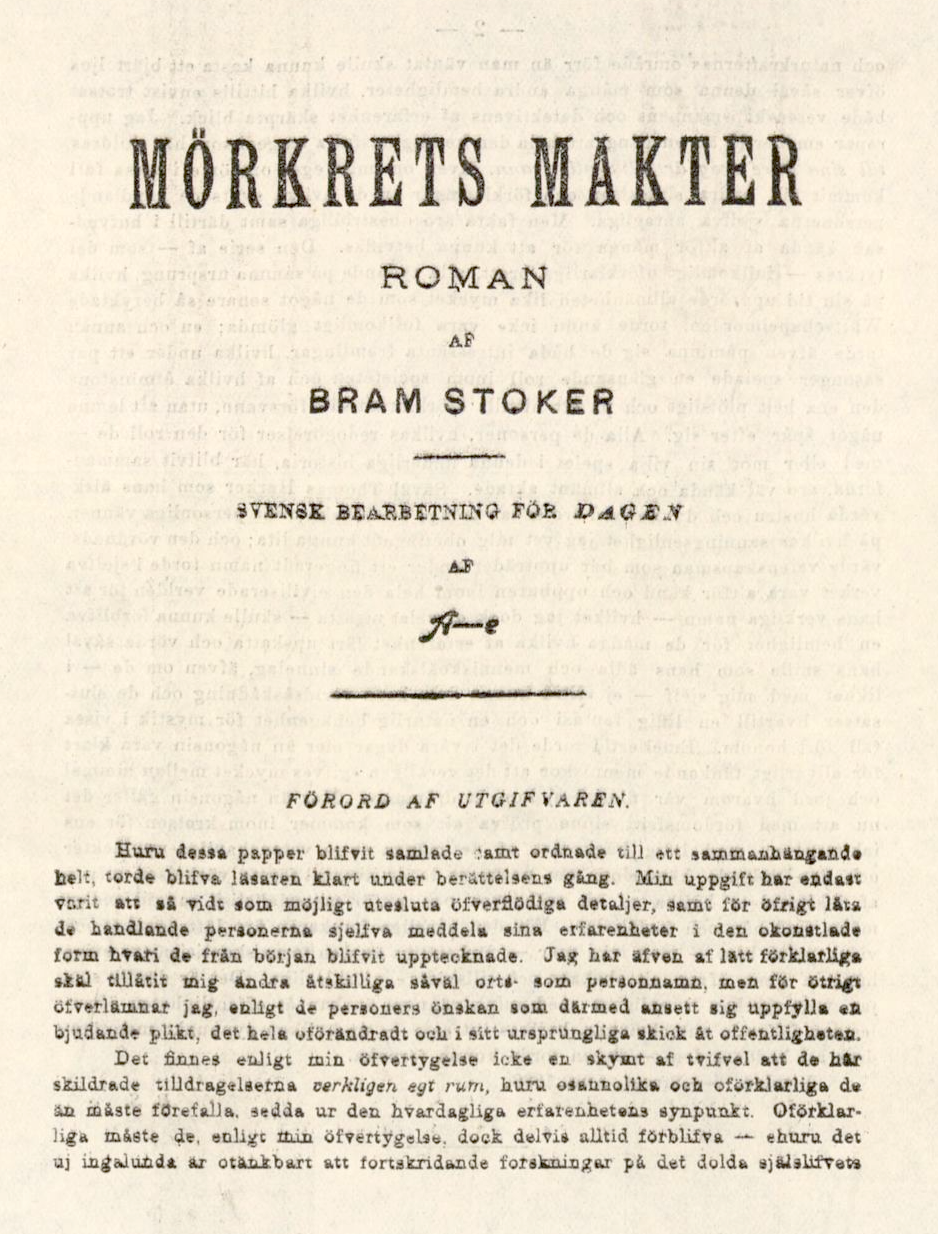
- The title page from Dagen
- Author: Bram Stoker, A—e (translator)
- Language: Swedish
- Genre: Horror, Gothic
- Publisher: Harald Sohlman
- Publication date: June 10, 1899–February 7, 1900
- Publication place: Sweden
- Pages: 688
- OCLC: 971019732

Powers of Darkness (Swedish Mörkrets makter) is an anonymous 1899 Swedish version of Bram Stoker's 1897 novel Dracula, serialised in the newspaper Dagen and credited only to Bram Stoker and the still-unidentified "A—e."

It is a variant or adaptation rather than a direct translation, with added characters, new plot elements and significant differences from the original. It served as the basis of a shorter Icelandic version under the same title the following year (Icelandic: Makt Myrkranna), which appeared as both a newspaper serial and a book.

Powers downplays the vampirism of Stoker's novel and portrays Dracula primarily as the head of an international cult inspired by Social Darwinism, whose goal is elimination of the weakest and world domination by an elite.

It was long assumed to have been based on lost or unpublished elements of Stoker's novel, such as preparatory notes and early drafts, but more recent research questions whether the translation is essentially a contemporary forgery, undertaken without Stoker's knowledge or consent. In the twenty-first century, new academic research and a renewed interest in the variant has led to several new translations and editions.

== Story ==
Like its source novel, Powers of Darkness is a Gothic horror story about an Englishman visiting a Transylvanian castle to arrange its aristocratic owner's purchase of a new property in England.

=== Differences between Dracula and Powers of Darkness ===
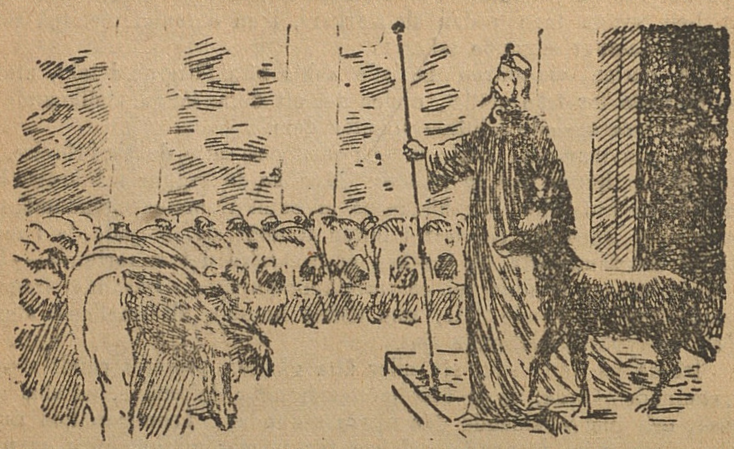
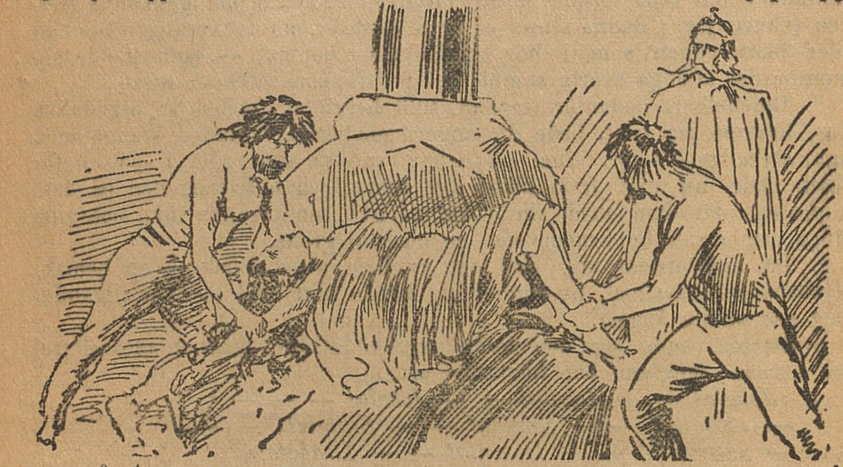
Original illustrations of Draculitz in Mörkrets Makter by Emil Åberg (1864–1940), first speaking to his cult, later sacrificing a virgin woman. Åberg was probably the first to ever depict Dracula in a published work.

Here the visitor is Thomas, Tom or Tómas Harker, rather than Jonathan, and Dracula becomes Draculitz. The early part of the story is similar to Stoker's, but where Stoker's Dracula lives alone, in Powers he shares his castle with a deaf-mute housekeeper and a cult of ape-like followers. Harker follows the housekeeper to a secret basement "temple", where he discovers the cult practising ritual sacrifice, but Draculitz does not drink the blood of their female victims; nor does he shapeshift, as in the original novel. In both Nordic variants Harker encounters a beautiful blonde woman in the castle, rather than the three vampire sisters, or brides, of Stoker's book, and while he is repulsed by them in Dracula, and relieved to be rescued by the Count's interruption, in Powers he is attracted to her and continues secretly to meet with her, in disobedience of his host's instructions.

Once he has arrived in England, Draculitz appears often in public, chatting pleasantly with Mina (here called Wilma or Vilma) and Lucy (called Western rather than Westenra) in the churchyard at Whitby, visiting Lucy when she is sick, and hosting a grand party with an international guest list at Carfax in London; Stoker's Dracula remained mostly in the shadows. Draculitz does not attack Mina, instead, she joins Hawkins and two new characters—the detectives Edward Tellet and Barrington Jones—and together they take their investigation to Transylvania and Castle Dracula, assisted by the Hungarian Secret Police en route. Unlike in Dracula, Van Helsing and his allies remain in England, where they kill Draculitz on Mina and her party's return.

Other new characters include Mina's uncle Morton and aristocrats called Prince Koromezzo, Countess Ida Varkony and Madame Saint Amand. The character of Renfield is not found in either Nordic version. Other original characters remain intact and are even among the vampires' victims: Holmwood and Seward die after falling prey to Lucy and Countess Vàrkony, respectively.

Reviewers and scholars alike have noted the more obvious eroticism of the Swedish and Icelandic Draculas: in The Guardian, critic Colin Fleming wrote that where Stoker's sexual metaphors "serve deeper, dark concepts", Makt Myrkranna "could have had the subtitle Lust in a Cape"; he notes Draculitz's preoccupation with female bosoms.

=== Social Darwinism and the Fin de Siècle ===
Draculitz not only has charge of the cult that gathers in his castle, but is known to correspond with international leaders, including English politicians and aristocrats, to engineer world domination. Several times he says that 'the world belongs to the strong' and protests that members of the elite have been suppressed by the majority for too long; his movement is growing, however, and will take over the world. His views reflect Social Darwinism, 'survival of the fittest' and the ideas of philosophers such as Nietzsche, as the growing fascist movement in Europe would increasingly interpret—or misinterpret—them.

Söhrman notes the suggestion that Dagen publisher Harald Sohlman may have had sympathy with these views, as in later life he rejected socialism and became more politically conservative (Elovson, 1953); the fact that Draculitz is the story's villain goes against this, however, and not only is the Count destroyed, but his international associates share his punishment, dying by murder and suicide. Berghorn describes Powers as a satire, warning against the turn-of-the-century theories that would lay the basis for Hitler's "master race". Powers references this zeitgeist directly when Seward quotes a contemporary tabloid:

By the way, the telegram section of the newspaper announces several strange news – lunatic behavior and deadly riots, organized by anti-Semites, in both Russia and Galicia as well as southern France – plundered stores, slain people – general insecurity of life and property – and the most fabulous tall tales about "ritual murders", abducted children and other unspeakable crimes, all of which is ascribed in earnestness to the poor Jews, while influential newspapers are instigating an all-encompassing extermination war against the "Israelites". You would think this is in the midst of the Dark Ages!

Along with rising fascism, the Fin de siècle saw a growth in new, esoteric religions, such as Theosophy and the Hermetic Order of the Golden Dawn, and Berghorn likewise sees these movements satirized in the occult pagan rituals of Draculitz's cult.

=== The East End, Jack the Ripper and the Thames Torso Murders ===
Bloom has observed the prominent role that the then-notorious East End of London plays in Powers. At the end of the nineteenth century, the area, which Bloom describes as Britain's "wild frontier", was associated with poverty, disease and crime, especially prostitution. He argues that allusions in the text suggest the Scandinavian authors or translators wanted to link Draculitz with Victorian serial killer Jack the Ripper, whose murder spree took place in the Whitechapel district in 1888.

De Roos contends that the Ripper connection is based largely on Dalby's 1986 mistranslation of the Icelandic preface, in turn a shortened version of the Swedish preface. Where Dalby's version says that "the murders of Jack the Ripper ... came into the story [of Powers of Darkness] a little later," De Roos corrects it to "the murders of Jack the Ripper ... happened a little later." In light of this revised timeline, De Roos sees a reference to the so-called Thames Torso Murders of 1887 in the following passage from Powers:

"Yes" – he said breathlessly and the fire virtually burned in his eyes, – "yes, these crimes, these terrible murders, these murdered women, these people found in sacks in the Thames, this blood, that flows, that flows and streams, while the murderer cannot be not found."

Bloom—who was commenting on the Icelandic text before the existence of its Swedish source was widely known—also observes similarities between the descriptions of Draculitz's female followers and the contemporary stereotype of the "exotic" Ashkenazi Jewish prostitutes whose dark complexions and perceived voluptuousness made them popular with East End pimps.

== Publication history ==
=== Mörkrets makter (Sweden) ===
Mörkrets makter was first published as a serial in the Stockholm newspaper Dagen, from 10 June 1899 to 7 February 1900. A second serialisation followed between 6 August 1899 and 31 March 1900 in the twice-weekly Aftonbladets Halfvecko-Upplaga, a rural tabloid edition of Dagen's national sister-paper Aftonbladet. While the Dagen variant was almost twice as long as Stoker's novel—300,000 words compared to 160,000—this second variant had a shortened ending and came to just 107,000 words. The longer Dagen version was republished in the popular magazine Tip-Top between 1916 and 1918.

Mörkrets Makters was illustrated by Swedish graphic artist Emil Åberg (1864–1940) from Uppsala. These are in turn probably the earliest depictions of Dracula ever published.

=== Makt myrkranna (Iceland) ===
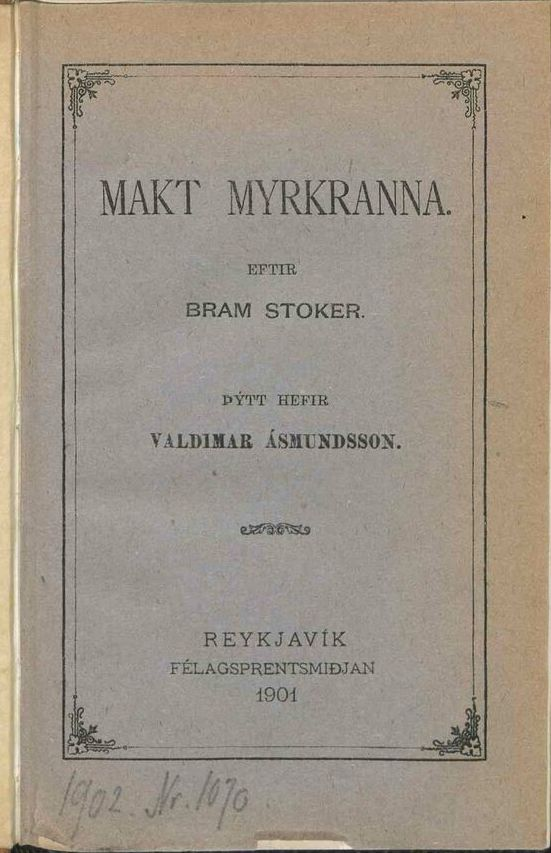
Title page of Makt Myrkranna

The Icelandic serial, Makt myrkranna, appeared in the Reykjavik newspaper Fjallkonan from January 1900 to March 1901. Later in 1901 it was published as a book under Stoker's name, with the translation credited to Valdimar Ásmundsson and publication simply to "Nokkrir Prentarar", which means "various publishers". It shortened the Aftonbladet variant drastically to 47,000 words and added references to Icelandic sagas. Where Mörkrets had retained the epistolary format of Stoker's novel throughout, Makt dispenses with it after the Transylvanian section.

Only one, very negative contemporary review of Makt myrkranna is known, in which Benedikt Björnsson described it as " worthless rubbish and sometimes even worse than worthless, completely devoid of poetry and beauty and far removed from any psychological truth."

Nevertheless Makt took on such cultural importance in its native country that in the twentieth century, Makt myrkranna became the standard Icelandic way to refer to the Dracula myth in film and literature, and the book was popular enough to warrant republication in 1950 by Hogni. Nobel literary laureate Halldór Laxness later praised it as "one of the best Icelandic novels imported from abroad."

=== Rediscovery, reprints and translations ===
The Icelandic Makt myrkranna came to worldwide attention in 1986, when American scholar Richard Dalby published an English translation of the preface, supposed at that time to have been written by Bram Stoker himself. He also supposed the entire text, in its published book form of 1901, to be a simple abridgement of Dracula and the first foreign translation of Stoker's text. All these assumptions turned out to be questionable or completely wrong: the first foreign translation was in Hungarian in 1898; the preface was almost certainly not Stoker, and part of it was likely plagiarised from another source; and it was a shortened, modified and translated version of a Swedish text that was itself a variant, with additions alongside portions translated from Stoker.

This last fact was unknown until Hans Corneel de Roos had published his English translation of Makt myrkranna under the title Powers of Darkness: The Lost Version of Dracula in 2017. His work on both the research and translation earned him a Lord Ruthven Special Award. Swedish publisher Rickard Berghorn contacted De Roos immediately after publication to inform him of the existence of Mörkrets makter, whose similarities and earlier date confirmed it was the source of the Icelandic text. The same year he republished the original Swedish text, as first seen in Dagen, with a foreword by John E. Browning.

In 2022, William Trimble edited a new English translation, produced by proofreading the OCR-read Swedish manuscript, then running it through two automated translation programs, before having the results refined by a human Swedish translator and two English editors. It was published alongside essays by Roos and other Dracula scholars, with the cover bearing a direct translation of the original title page: "Powers of Darkness, by Bram Stoker, Swedish adaptation by A—e."

Shortly afterwards in the same year, native Swedish speaker Rickard Berghorn published his own translation as Powers of Darkness: The Unique Version of Dracula. It was published with a new introductory essay by the translator and, for the hardback edition only, a foreword by Professor Clive Bloom. Both the Trimble and Berghorns editions reproduced original illustrations by Emil Åberg, which De Roos also published in a separate volume, Dracula: The Swedish Drawings (1899–1900). A newly illustrated edition of the Berghorn translation, limited to 500 copies and with a foreword by Dacre Stoker, was published by Centipede Press as Powers of Darkness: The First Dracula later in 2022.

== Authorship and sources ==
Before 2017, scholars commonly assumed that Powers of Darkness was based primarily on Stoker's own work, being either translated directly from Dracula or based on his preparatory notes and early drafts. Once it became clear that the Swedish Mörkrets makter predated and served as the source of the Icelandic Makt myrkranna, scholarly consensus gradually came to cast doubt on Stoker's involvement (De Roos 2021).

=== Identity of A—e ===
The 1899 newspaper serial identifies the story as an "adaptation" (Swedish bearbetning), rather than a translation, per se, by someone called "A—e."

Early suggestions that the initials are connected to Valdimar Ásmundsson, credited with Makt myrkranna, must now be rejected, as later research has proved that the Swedish variant predated the Icelandic.

Berghorn quickly dismissed De Roos's suggestion that it stood for "Aftonbladets editor", as the Swedish for "editor" would be redaktör. More recently, De Roos has proposed the initials stand for Albert Andersson-Edenberg (1834–1913), a senior journalist and associate of Dagen editor Sohlman who wrote under pseudonyms including "A.-E.," "A.E." and "A.E-g." and had occasionally translated from English. He bolsters his argument by identifying peculiar phrases used in both Powers and in Andersson-Edenberg's published works, such as "true Valkyries from the Bavarian highlands." Berghorn has dismissed many of De Roos's examples of similarities as coincidence and misunderstandings.

Berghorn argues that A—e must be one or several Swedish Theosophists in the tradition of Helena Blavatsky, since many of the additional scenes are clearly inspired by Theosophy. The signature A—e was used in spiritualist and Theosophical writings at the time, but cannot be found anywhere else in Swedish publications. He makes the supposition that the Swedish translator, socialist, Theosophist, Dagen co-worker, and philosopher Axel Frithiof Åkerberg, and his good friend and collaborator, the translator Victor Pfeiff, were behind the signature.

=== Stoker's involvement ===
Researchers have proposed various ways Stoker himself could have been involved in the creation of Powers. Early on in the study of Makt myrkranna, De Roos, unaware of the text's earlier Swedish source, identified several similarities between it and Bram Stoker's notes, such as a "secret room—coloured like blood" and the characters of the silent housekeeper and a police inspector. De Roos suggests several ways Icelandic translator Valdimar Ásmundsson may have been introduced to the Dracula author, including through mutual literary friends such as Mark Twain, Hall Caine and Frederic WH Myers, but he otherwise finds no evidence of correspondence between Ásmundsson and Stoker. Either way, the rediscovery of the Swedish original proves that the new ideas in Powers did not originate with Ásmundsson, so no connection is necessary.

In 2016, Stoker biographer David J. Skal lent his support to the theory that Powers was based on a lost early draft of Dracula, again pointing to similarities with Stoker's notes. The following year Berghorn pointed out parallels with Stoker's posthumously published Dracula's Guest, arguing that this was an early Dracula draft and, in turn, a source of Powers; the "flowery style" and the character of Countess Dolingen of Gratz are named, among other similarities. Berghorn qualifies his claims, however, pointing to references in Powers to current events (antisemitic riots in France, the so-called Orlean conspiracy) and technology (the cinematograph) that would have to post-date any proposed early draft by Stoker, and therefore must have originated with the Nordic authors.

The allusions in Powers to Jack the Ripper and the Thames Torso Murders, both in the preface and in the story itself, have also been offered as evidence of Stoker's involvement. How would a Scandinavian author or translator have known of the latter incidents? De Roos counters this theory: While not widely reported in Sweden, the Thames murders did receive some attention in the Scandinavian press, and a journalist such as Andersson-Edenberg would have had access to British newspapers. Stockholm's newsrooms, such as those of Dagen, received the London Times and Telegraph daily by telegraph, for example.

=== Forgery ===
In his 2016 biography of Bram Stoker, Skal describes Powers of Darkness as "unauthorized fan fiction". In their 2020 article "Dracula or Draculitz?" Brundan et al take this notion further, arguing that the nineteenth-century public's insatiable appetite for vampire literature meant that the practices of writers and publishers were themselves a kind of vampirism, appropriating earlier literature the way Dracula appropriated human bodies. The Victorian vampire genre, therefore, is uniquely characterised by fraud, forgery and plagiarism. Citing earlier Dracula scholars such as Pope, Radick and Wycke, they demonstrate that Stoker himself borrowed considerably from earlier vampire stories, including Karl von Wachsmann's Der Fremde (The Stranger). Even the story within the story includes fabrication and deception, and contains several hints at the unreliability of supposedly authentic documentary evidence: Dracula destroys the primary evidence by burning documents, for example, so many of the very texts held up as proof of the tale within the story are necessarily copies.

Insofar as they claim to be translations, the two Nordic versions of Powers of Darkness are forgeries. Not only do they falsely attribute authorship to Stoker and contain fraudulent prefaces, but they also borrow liberally from other writing, including Sheridan Le Fanu's Carmilla and Edgar Allan Poe's The Masque of the Red Death and The Facts in the Case of M. Valdemar.

== Preface and plagiarism from Bernhard Wadström's memoirs ==
In 1986, Richard Dalby was the first to draw attention to the preface outside the Scandinavian countries, translating the Icelandic version into English for the first time (Dalby 1986). It is attributed directly to Bram Stoker and presents the story as a reliable report of real events, but with names changed to protect identities. The Icelandic version ends with the quote from Shakespeare's Hamlet: "There are more things in heaven and earth than are dreamt of in your philosophy." The Swedish preface contains several more lines, however, which De Roos discovered were taken almost word-for-word from the memoirs of a Lutheran pastor, Bernhard Wadström, published in Sweden three months before Mörkrets makter.

Other elements of Powers contain traces of Wadström's influence, including the appearance of the "White Lady" and the fiery sky being viewed from a top-floor gallery. De Roos deems this as further evidence that Stoker was not involved in or even aware of the Swedish text, as it's unlikely he would have borrowed ideas from a Swedish publication.
