= Þórunn Jónassen =

Icelandic feminist and women's association chair (1850–1922)

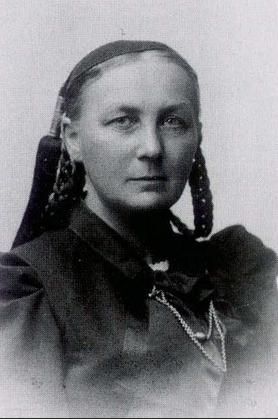
Þórunn Jónassen

Þórunn Jónassen, also Þórunn Hafstein Pétursdóttir (1850–1922) was an Icelandic feminist, the first chair of Thorvaldsensfélagið (Thorvaldsen's Society), Iceland's oldest women's association, a post she maintained for 47 years. She was also one of four pioneering women who were elected to Reykjavík's city council in 1908. Alongside her in City Council were three other newly elected women; Bríet Bjarnhéðinsdóttir, Guðrún Björnsdóttir and Katrín Magnússon.

== Biography ==
Born in Ketilsstaðir á Völlum near Vallanes in eastern Iceland, Þórunn Jónassen was the daughter of Pétur Havstein, a magistrate, and Guðrún Hannesdóttir Stephensen.

Following her mother's death when she was only 10 months old, she was raised by foster parents and relatives. She completed her education in Copenhagen at Natalie Zahle's School where she was introduced to the importance of fighting for women's rights and education. On returning to Iceland, in 1871 she married Jónasi Jónassen, a physician at Reykjavík's hospital. They had one daughter, Soffía, born in 1873.

In 1875, Þórunn was elected the first chair of Thorvaldsensfélagið, a women's association dedicated to promoting public health and to assisting those in difficulty. She remained in the post until she died 47 years later. She also served as secretary of the National Health Insurance Board and was elected to the city council of Reykjavík in 1908.

Þórunn Jónassen died in Reykjavík on 18 April 1922.
