= Björnsdóttir =

Björnsdóttir is an Icelandic surname. Notable people with the surname include:

- Agusta Edda Bjornsdóttir (born 1977), Icelandic road racing cyclist
- Anna Svanhildur Björnsdóttir (born 1948), Icelandic writer
- Hansína Regína Björnsdóttir (1884–1973), Icelandic photographer
- Guðrún Björnsdóttir (1853–1936), Icelandic politician
- Selma Björnsdóttir (born 1974), Icelandic actress
- Sigrún Edda Björnsdóttir (born 1958), Icelandic actress
