= Guðrún Björnsdóttir =

Icelandic politician

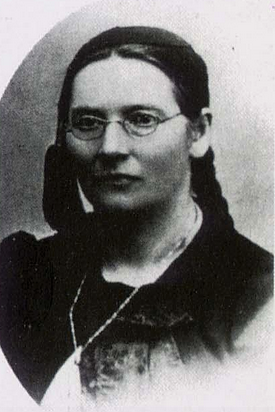

Member of the Reykjavík City Council
- In office 1908–1914

Personal details
- Born: 27 November 1853 Eyjólfsstaðir, Iceland
- Died: 11 September 1936 (aged 82) Reykjavík, Iceland

Guðrún Björnsdóttir (27 November 1853 – 11 September 1936) was an Icelandic politician and women's rights activist. She was a founder of the Icelandic Women's Rights Association and one of the first female members of the Reykjavík City Council.

== Early life and family ==
Guðrún Björnsdóttir was born at Eyjólfsstaðir on 27 November 1853 where she lived until the age of 10 when her father died. She was then sent to Eskifjörður for foster care, but soon moved to Langanes to live with her uncle. For a brief period she lived in Copenhagen, but soon returned to her relatives in Langanes.

In 1884, she married pastor Lárus Jóhannesson, and in Sauðanes they raised four daughters. After only four years of marriage, Guðrún's husband died. One of her daughters would later die in the Spanish flu.

Guðrún stayed with her brother in Norður-Þingeyjarsýsla until she moved with her daughters to Reykjavík in 1900 where she became a milk vendor. She also began writing articles in the papers about milk sales and personal hygiene.

== Political career ==
Guðrún was prominent in the local women's rights movement in the early 20th century and was a founder of the Icelandic Women's Rights Association. She was one of the first women elected to the Reykjavík City Council. Alongside her in City Council were three other newly elected women; Bríet Bjarnhéðinsdóttir, Þórunn Jónassen, and Katrín Magnússon.

Guðrún sat in the town council from 1908 to 1914, focused on health and educational issues. In particular, she promoted women's education and their right to hold office. She helped towards establishing a Women's Student Scholarship Fund.

== Death and legacy ==
Guðrún died in Reykjavík on 11 September 1936. A memorial about her, which appeared in Morgunblaðið on 18 September 1936, noted:

The death of Mrs. Guðrún marks the passing of a woman who was an old style grand lady and an early pioneer for the new women rights for the country. (Note: Icelandic Með frú Guðrúnu er fallin í valinn kona, sem var í senn stórbrotin kona í gömlum stíl og ein af brautreyðjendum hinna nýju kvenrjettinda í landinu.)

In November 2010, the Reykjavík City Council announced renaming a street in the city as Guðrúnartún, in honor of Guðrún Björnsdóttir.
