= Valdimar Ásmundsson =

Icelandic translator (1852–1902)

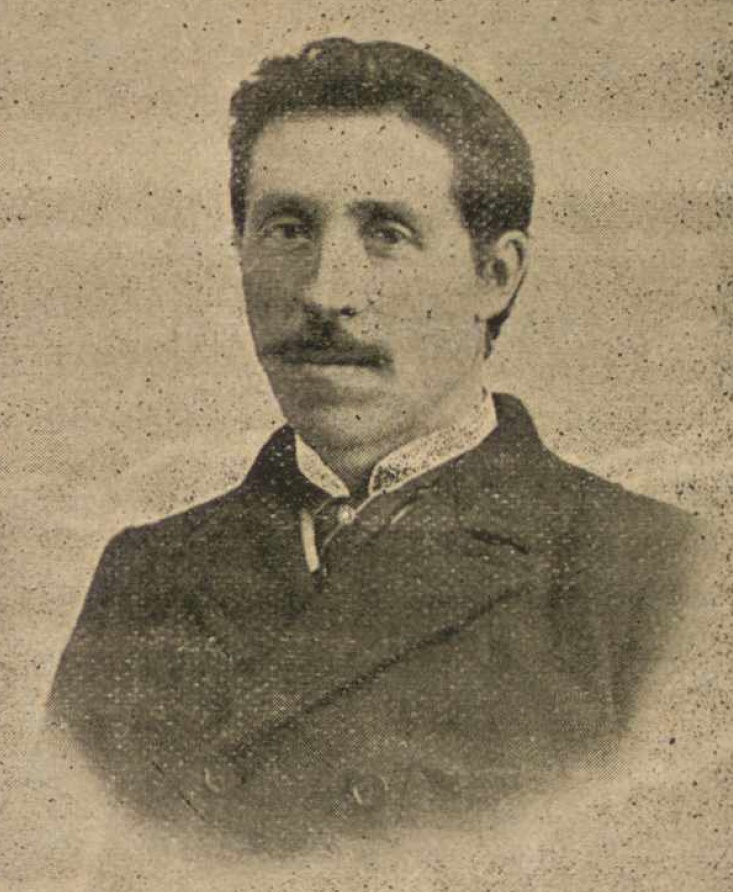

Valdimar Ásmundsson (Jóhann Valdimar Ásmundsson, also Ásmundarson) (10 July 1852 - 17 April 1902) was the founder and editor of Fjallkonan (The Lady of the Mountain magazine). Valdimar was married to Bríet Bjarnhéðinsdóttir, a feminist and publisher of Kvennablaðið.

Valdimar was born at Hvarf in Bárðardalur and grew up with his parents in Þistilfjörður. He was not sent to school but studied on his own. Between the ages of twenty and thirty, he went to Reykjavík and was involved in popular education for a while, but only until he founded the magazine Fjallkonan in 1884. His other main job at the time involved the preparation of a version the Icelandic sagas to be printed by the publisher Sigurður Kristjánsson in 38 volumes.

Valdimar knew German, English and French as well as Danish, but he had mostly learned all these languages himself. He was also very good at Icelandic. He wrote a book on Icelandic grammar, which soon became a widely used textbook.

Valdimar translated Powers of Darkness (Swedish: Mörkrets Makter) by Bram Stoker from the Swedish serialization in Aftonbladets Halfvecko-Upplaga. His Icelandic translation was published under the title Makt Myrkranna, first for Fjallkonan in 1900, later in book form in 1901. Halldór Laxness reflects on the significance of this translation in one of his memoirs.

Valdimar died after almost 24 hours of stroke or brain disease at the age of almost fifty.

His daughter, Laufey Valdimarsdóttir, was a notable lawyer.
