= Laufey Valdimarsdóttir =

Icelandic women's rights activist and lawyer (1890–1945)

Laufey Valdimarsdóttir (1 March 1890 – 9 December 1945) was an Icelandic women's rights activist and lawyer.

Laufey completed her matriculation degree from Reykjavik High School, the first female in 1910, with a first grade. She became chairman of the Women's Association in 1927 and the first chairman of the Maternity Strengthening Committee in 1928.

She was the daughter of women's rights advocate Bríet Bjarnhéðinsdóttir and the liberal editor Valdimar Ásmundsson.
