= 1975 Icelandic women's strike =

General strike to achieve equal pay protection

- Women's Day Off
- Date: 24 October 1975
- Location: Iceland
- Caused by: Gender pay gap, occupational sexism
- Goals: To "demonstrate the indispensable work of women for Iceland's economy and society" and "protest wage discrepancy and unfair employment practices".
- Methods: Women's strike

On 24 October 1975, Icelandic women went on strike for the day to "demonstrate the indispensable work of women for Iceland's economy and society" and to "protest wage discrepancy and unfair employment practices". It was publicized domestically as Women's Day Off (Icelandic: Kvennafrídagurinn). Participants, led by women's organizations, did not go to their paid jobs and did not do any housework or child-rearing for the whole day. 90% of Iceland's female population participated in the strike. Iceland's parliament passed a law guaranteeing equal rights to women and men the following year.

== History ==
Icelandic women who worked outside of the home before 1975 earned less than sixty percent of what men earned.

The United Nations announced that 1975 was going to be International Women's Year. A representative from a women's group called the Redstockings put forward the idea of a strike as one of the events in honor of it. The committee decided to call the strike a "day off" since they thought this term would be more pleasant and more effective in engaging the masses. Also, some women could have been fired for going on strike but could not be denied a day off.

Women's organizations spread the word about the Day Off throughout the country. The Day Off event organizers got radio stations, television, and newspapers to run stories about gender-based discrimination and lower wages for women. The event garnered international attention.

== Women's Day Off ==
On 24 October 1975, Icelandic women did not go to their paid jobs or do any housework or child-rearing at home. Ninety percent of women took part, including women in rural communities. Fish factories were closed since many of the factory workers were women.

During the Day Off, 25,000 out of a population of 220,000 people in Iceland gathered in the centre of Reykjavik, Iceland's capital, for a rally. At the rally, women listened to speakers, sang, and talked to each other about what could be done to achieve gender equality in Iceland. There were many speakers, including a housewife, two parliament members, a women's movement representative, and a female worker. The last speech of the day was by Aðalheiður Bjarnfreðsdóttir, who "represented Sókn, the trade union for the lowest-paid women in Iceland".

Employers prepared for the day without women by buying sweets, pencils, and paper to entertain the children brought into work by their fathers. As a result, sausages, a popular meal, sold out in many stores that day.

== Aftermath ==
The Day Off had a lasting impact and became known colloquially as "the long Friday".

Iceland's parliament passed a law guaranteeing equal rights the following year. The strike also paved the way for the election of Vigdís Finnbogadóttir, the first democratically elected female president in the world five years later in 1980.

Every ten years, on the anniversary of the Day Off, women stop work early. In 1975, the women strikers left work at 2:05 p.m., and in 2005 they left at 2:08 p.m., intended to symbolically reflect “the amount of progress made in 30 years”. Increasing the frequency of strikes, in 2010, they left work at 2:25 p.m. and in 2016 at 2:38 p.m., with many women taking part in the Viking Clap outside the Althing.

== Legacy ==
The 2016 Black Monday in Poland was modelled on the 1975 Icelandic strike.

The International Women's Strike, a global version inspired by the Icelandic strike, spread in 2017 and 2018.

== See also ==
- Women in Iceland
