= Emil Åberg (artist) =

Swedish illustrator and cartoonist (1864–1940)

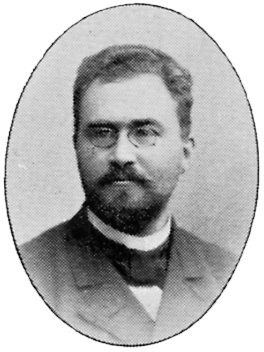
- Photo of Emil Åberg from Svensk Portraättgalleri Vol XX
- Born: 28 January 1864; Uppsala, Sweden
- Died: 27 March 1940 (aged 76); Sollentuna
- Known for: Illustration, cartoons, animation

Oskar Filip Emil Åberg (2 January 1864 – 27 March 1940) was a Swedish painter, graphic artist, illustrator, animator, and director.

== Biography ==
Emil Åberg was the son of Captain Carl Emil Ferdinand Åberg and Hedda Wilhelmina Moll. He studied painting with Edvard Perséus and at the Technical School in Stockholm. Then he studied at the Academy of Fine Arts 1883–1888 doing etching for Axel Tallberg. Together with Aron Gerle, he exhibited at Hultbergs konsthandel in Stockholm in 1911 and he participated in group exhibitions with the Swedish Artists' Association and the Graphic Society. He participated in the Baltic exhibition 1914 and in an international graphics exhibition in Leipzig 1914.

In his art, Emil Åberg often painted genre pictures in 18th century environments, landscape views, city views and portraits, often using warm colors.

As an illustrator, he made pictures for newspapers, postcards and several issues of the Children's Library Saga and Christmas magazines. Emil Åberg worked in 1916 for the production company Pathé Frère's branch in Stockholm and made three animated short films there.

Emil Åberg is buried in the Northern Cemetery (Norra begravningsplatsen) outside Stockholm.

== Works ==
=== Books illustrated ===
- I vilda vestern : äfventyr, upplefvade i indianernas land(1895) by Ludvig Anders
- Ljus och skuggor : originalberättelse (1899) by Leonard Strömberg
- De tre musketörerna (The Three Musketeers)(1902) by Alexandre Dumas
- Kalle Hjelms barndomsminnen : berättande af honom sjelf : och upptecknade (1889)
- Grefven af Montecristo (The Count of Monte Cristo) (1902) by Alexandre Dumas
- Myladys son eller tjugu år efteråt. (1902) by Alexandre Dumas

=== Serialized works illustrated ===
- Mörkrets makter (Powers of Darkness) (1899) by A—e

=== Animated short films ===
Little Kalle's Dream of His Snowman

Mr. Klot, Mr. Spider-Bone and Little Miss Synål

The Adventures of Master Tricks

- 1916 – Little Kalle's dream of his snowman (Lilla Kalles dröm om sin snögubbe)
- 1916 – Mr. Klot, Mr. Spider-Bone and Little Miss Synål (Herr Klot, herr Spindelben och lilla fröken Synål)
- 1916 – The Adventures of Master Tricks (Mäster Tricks äventyr)

=== Gallery ===
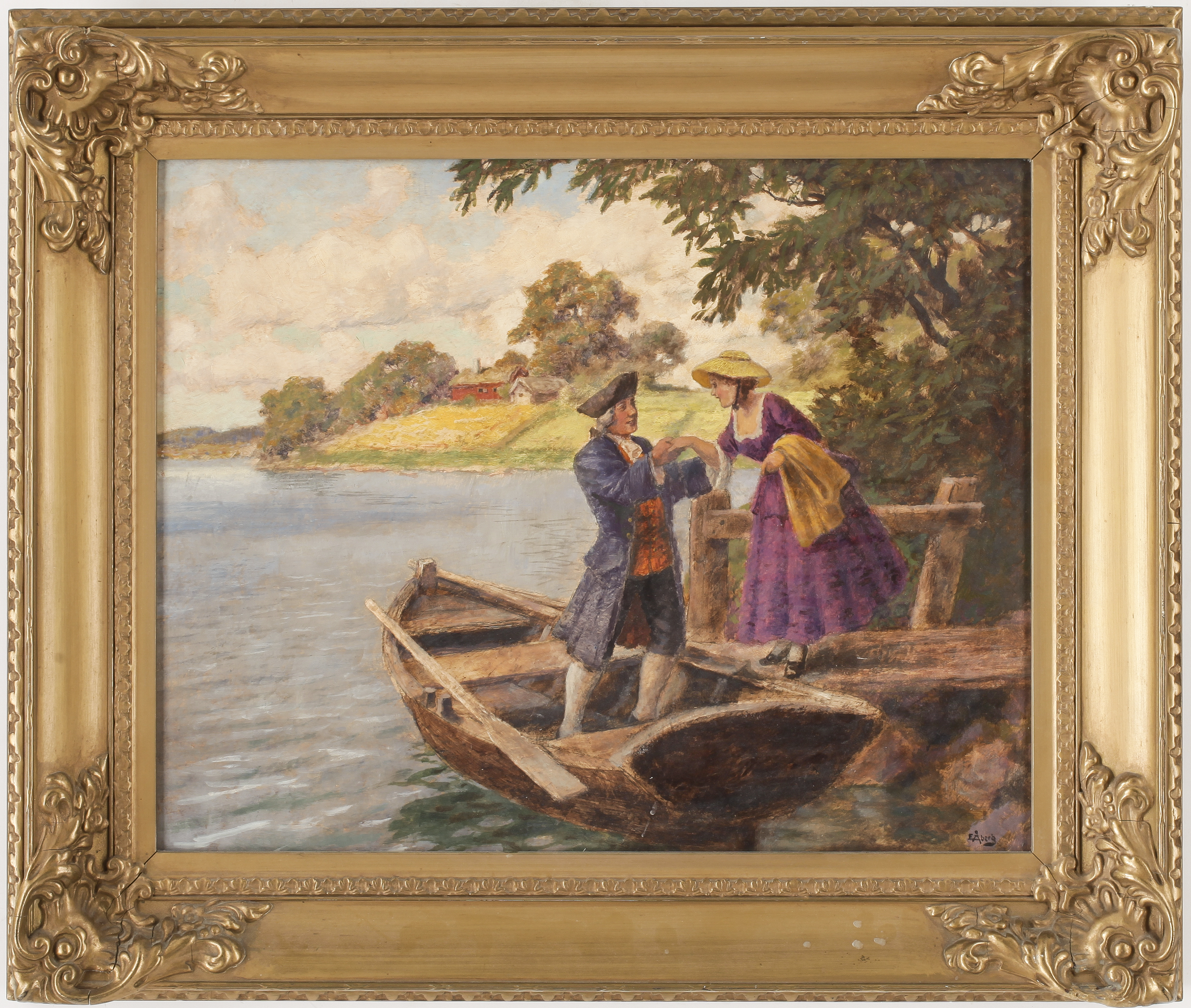
Boat trip.

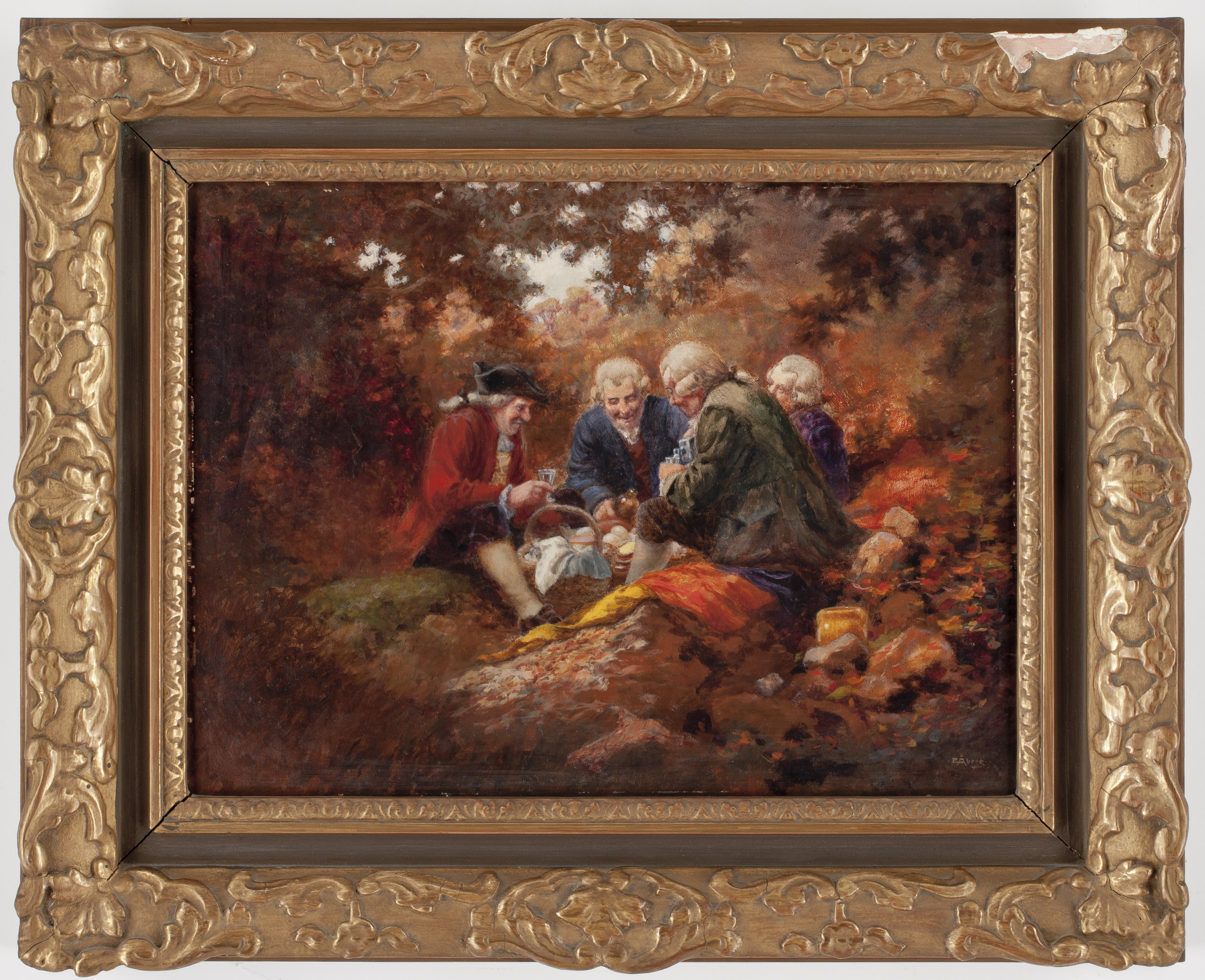
Drinking company on an excursion.

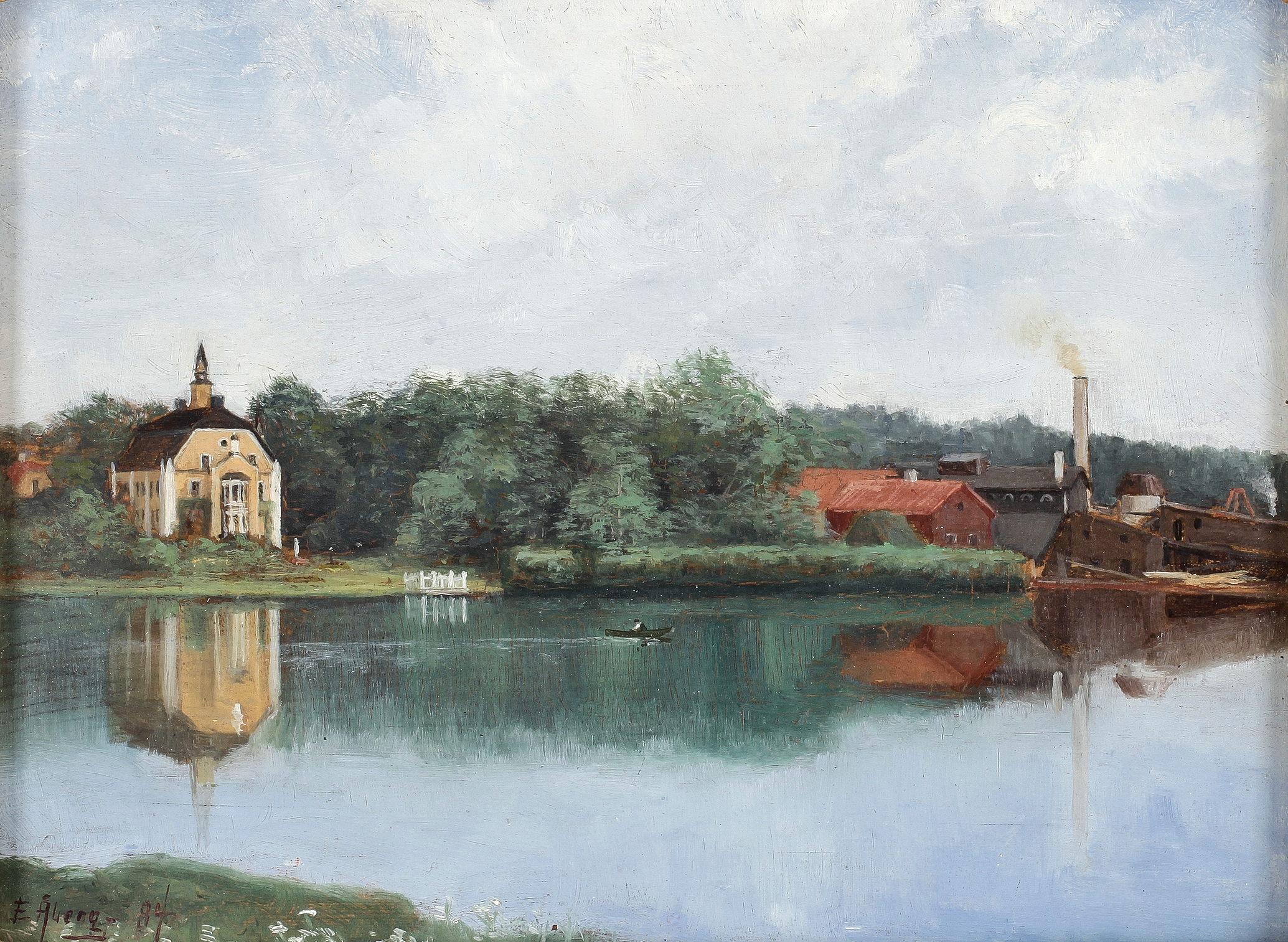
Mill environment, 1884.

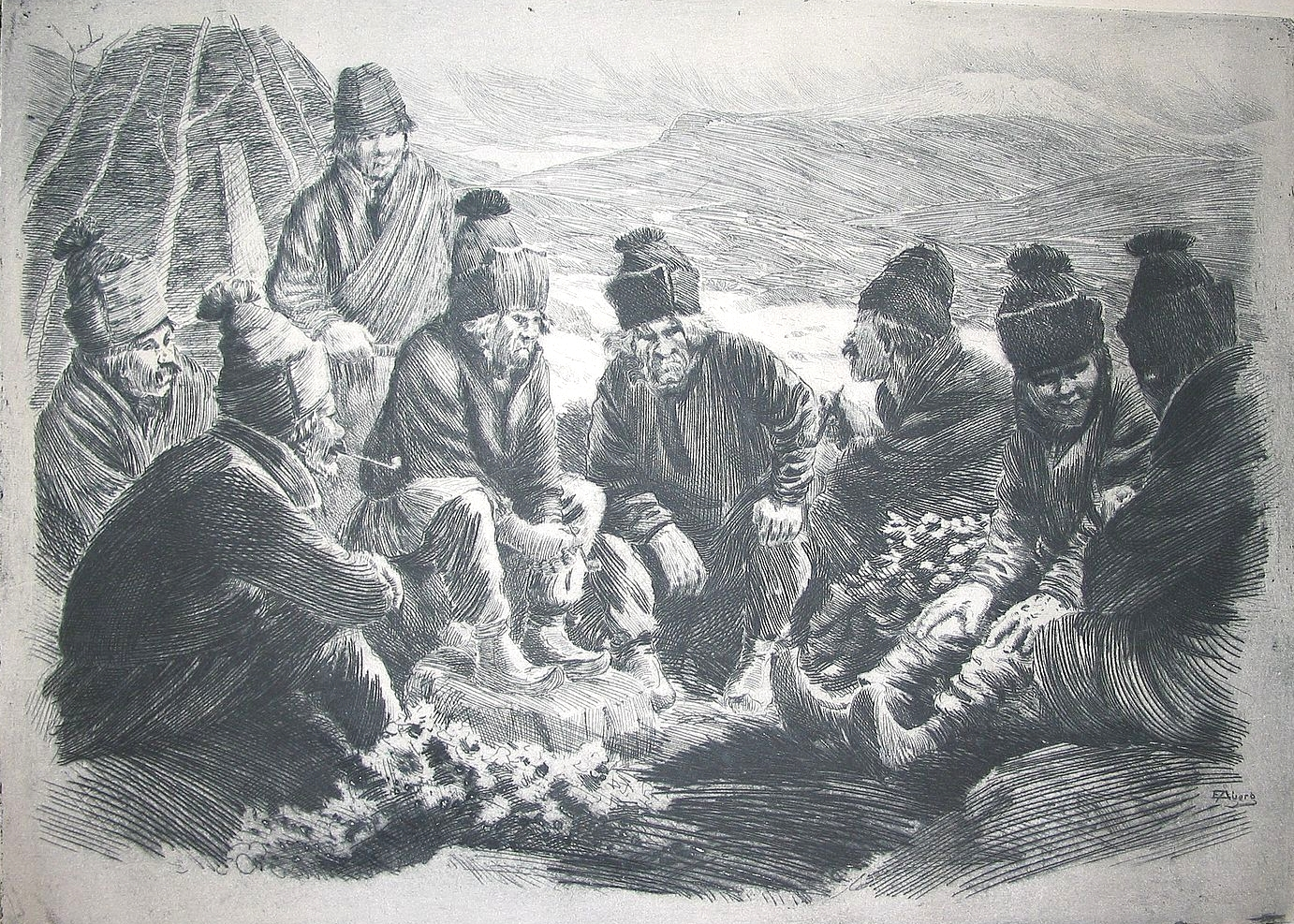
Council, etsning.

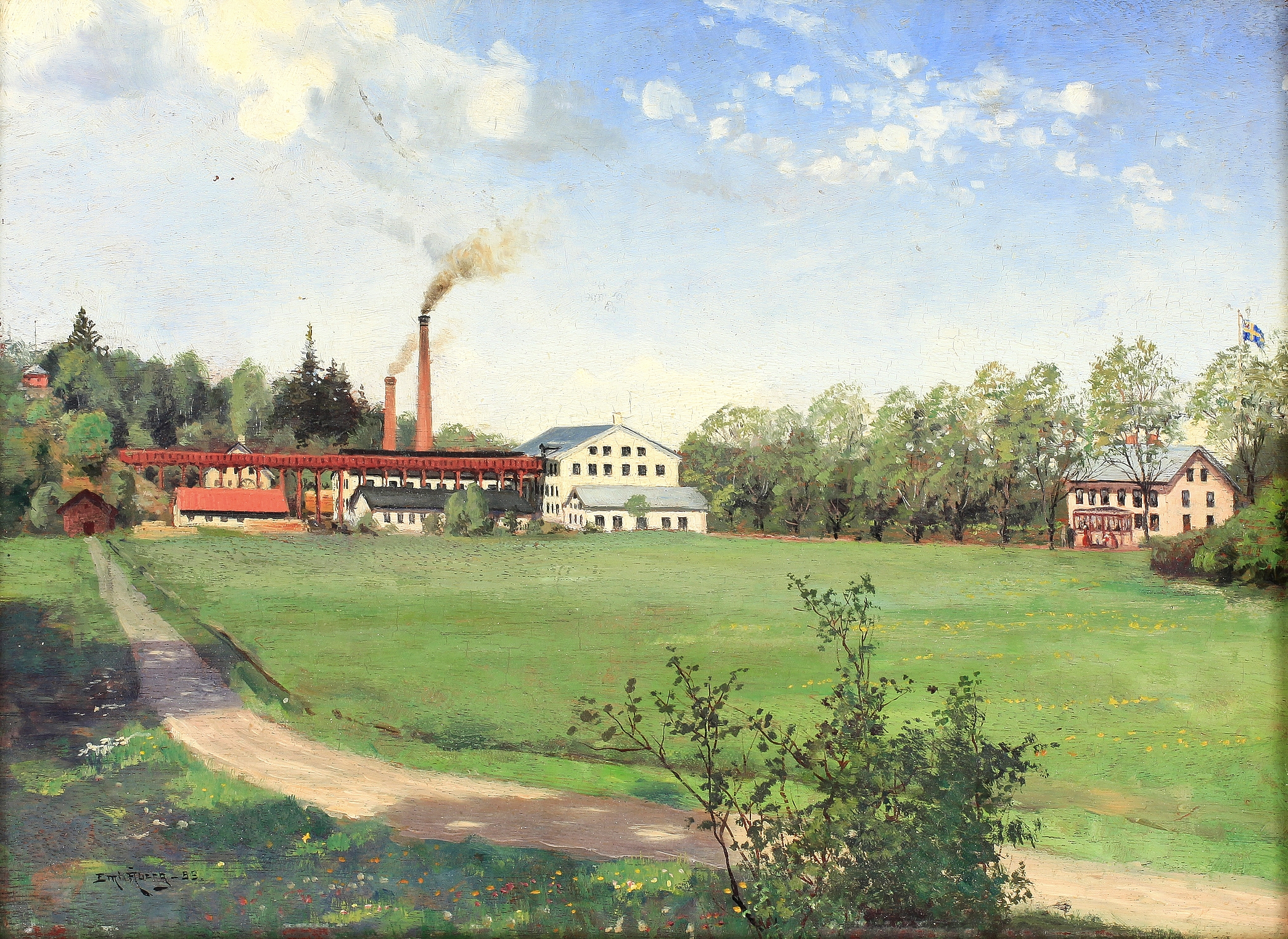
Gustavsberg, 1883.

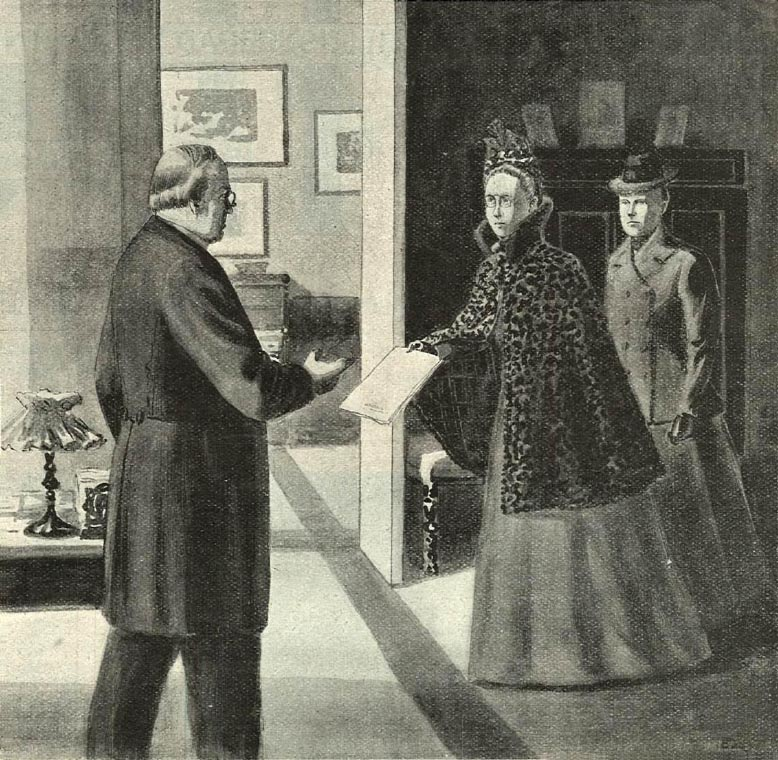
Voting rights petition, Idun 1900.
