= Vallanes =

- Farm
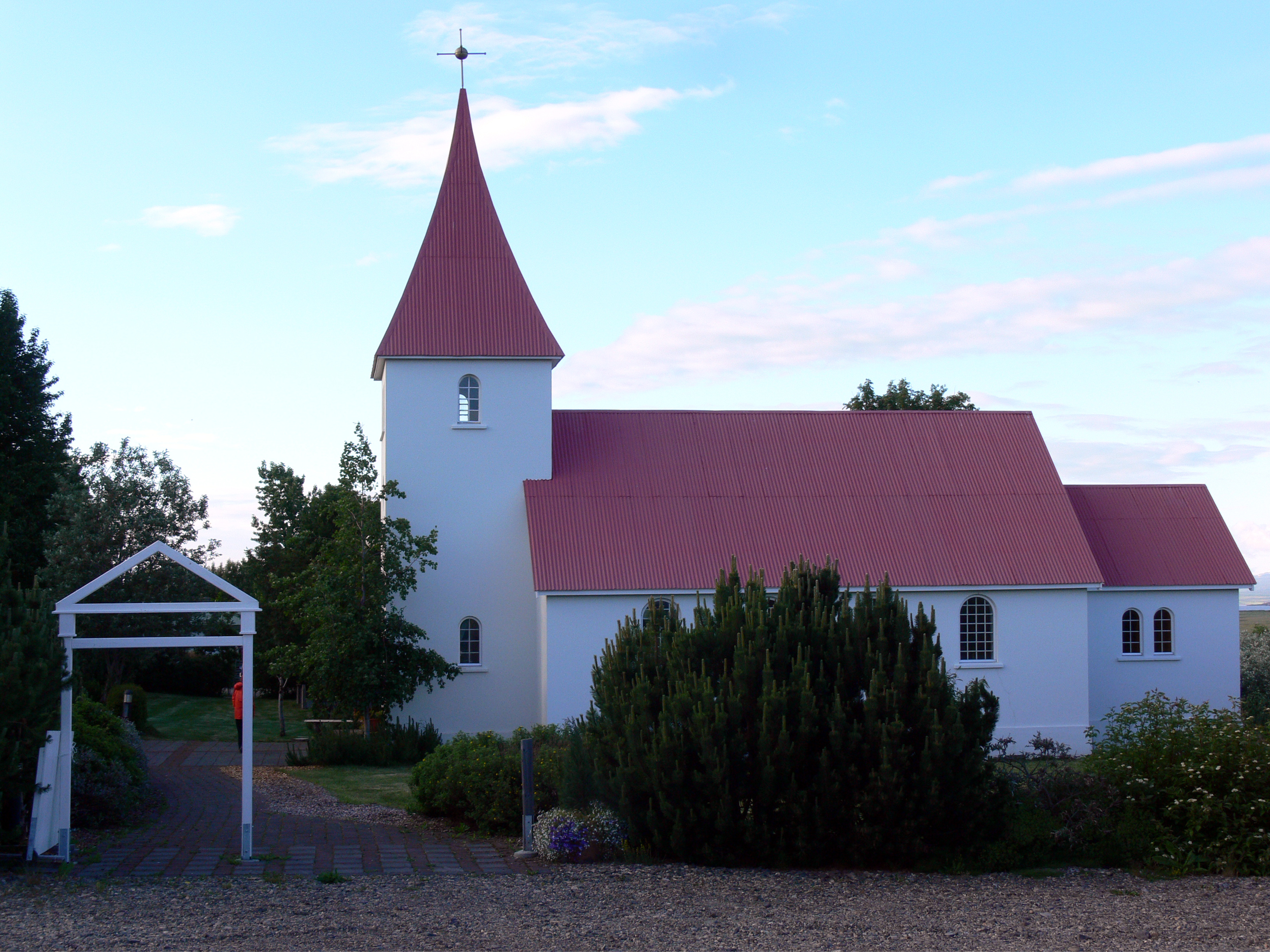
- The church at Vallanes

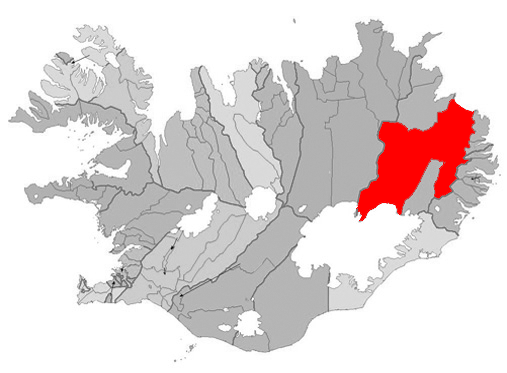
- Location of the Municipality of Fljótsdalshérað

- Location of Vallanes in Iceland
- Coordinates: 65°12′N 14°33′W
- Country: Iceland
- Constituency: Northeast Constituency
- Region: Eastern Region
- Municipality: Fljótsdalshérað
- Time zone: UTC+0 (GMT)

Vallanes (Icelandic pronunciation: [ˈvatlaˌnɛːs]) is a farm in the east of Iceland and is close to Egilsstaðir.
