= Hið íslenska kvenfélag =

Icelandic women's organization

Hið íslenska kvenfélag was an Icelandic women's organization, founded in Reykjavík in 1894.

The purpose of the society was to work for the improvement in women's rights, and inform women of already existing rights and encourage them to use them. The society was founded by a group of educated and wealthy women after the king had turned down a request to found a university in Iceland, and one of its main goals was to improve educational and cultural possibilities for women. It was not the first women's organization in Iceland - that was the charity organization Thorvaldsensfélagið in 1875 - but it was the first women's organization devoted to women's rights in Iceland and somewhat of a starting point of the women's movement. It worked alongside Kvenréttindafélag Íslands to introduced women's suffrage.
