= Harald Sohlman =

Swedish publisher (1868-1927)

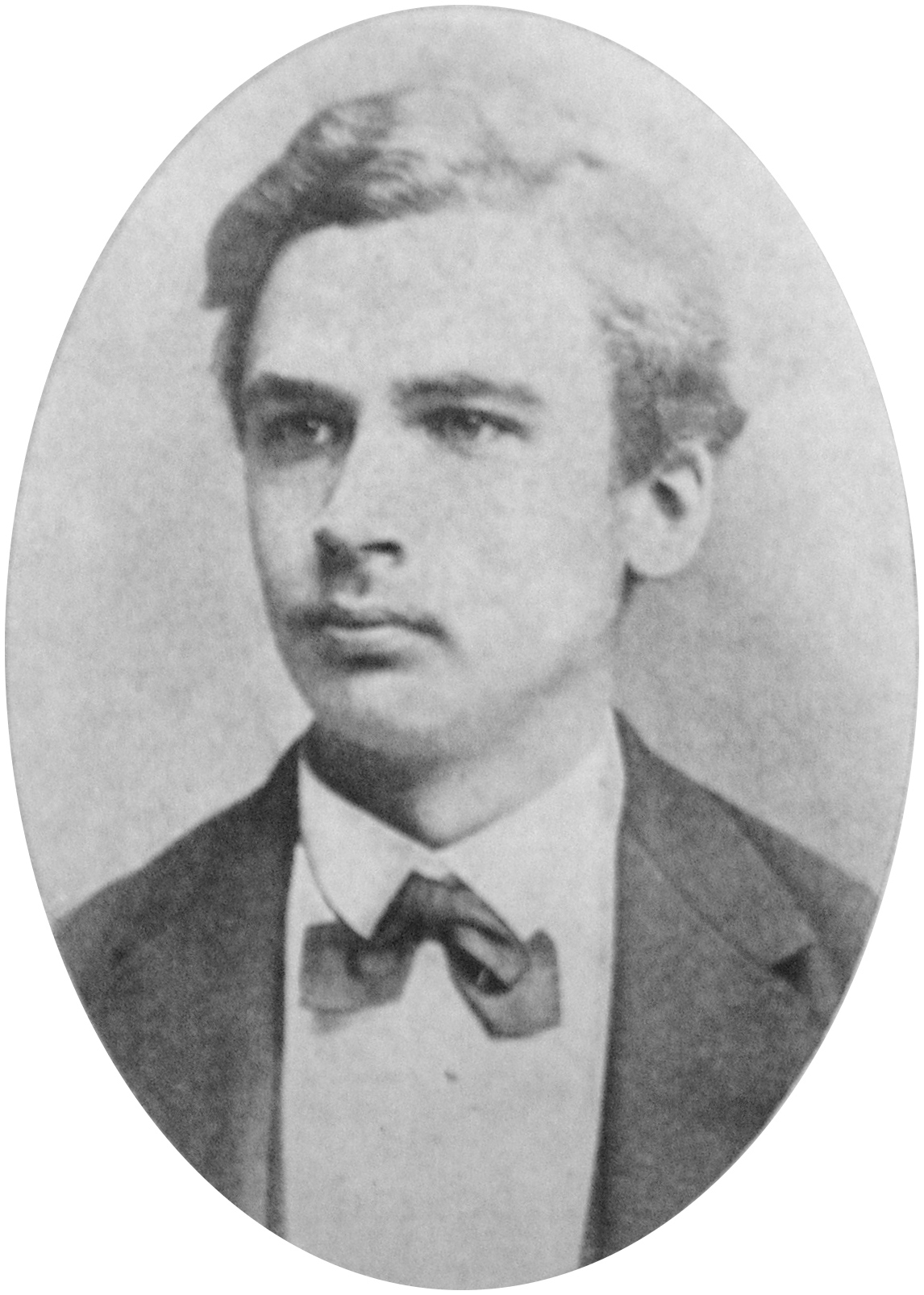
- Born: 24 January 1858; Stockholm, Sweden
- Died: 1 May 1927 (aged 69); Stockholm, Sweden
- Occupations: Journalist; Newspaper editor
- Known for: Editor of Aftonbladet
- Relatives: Rolf Sohlman (nephew)

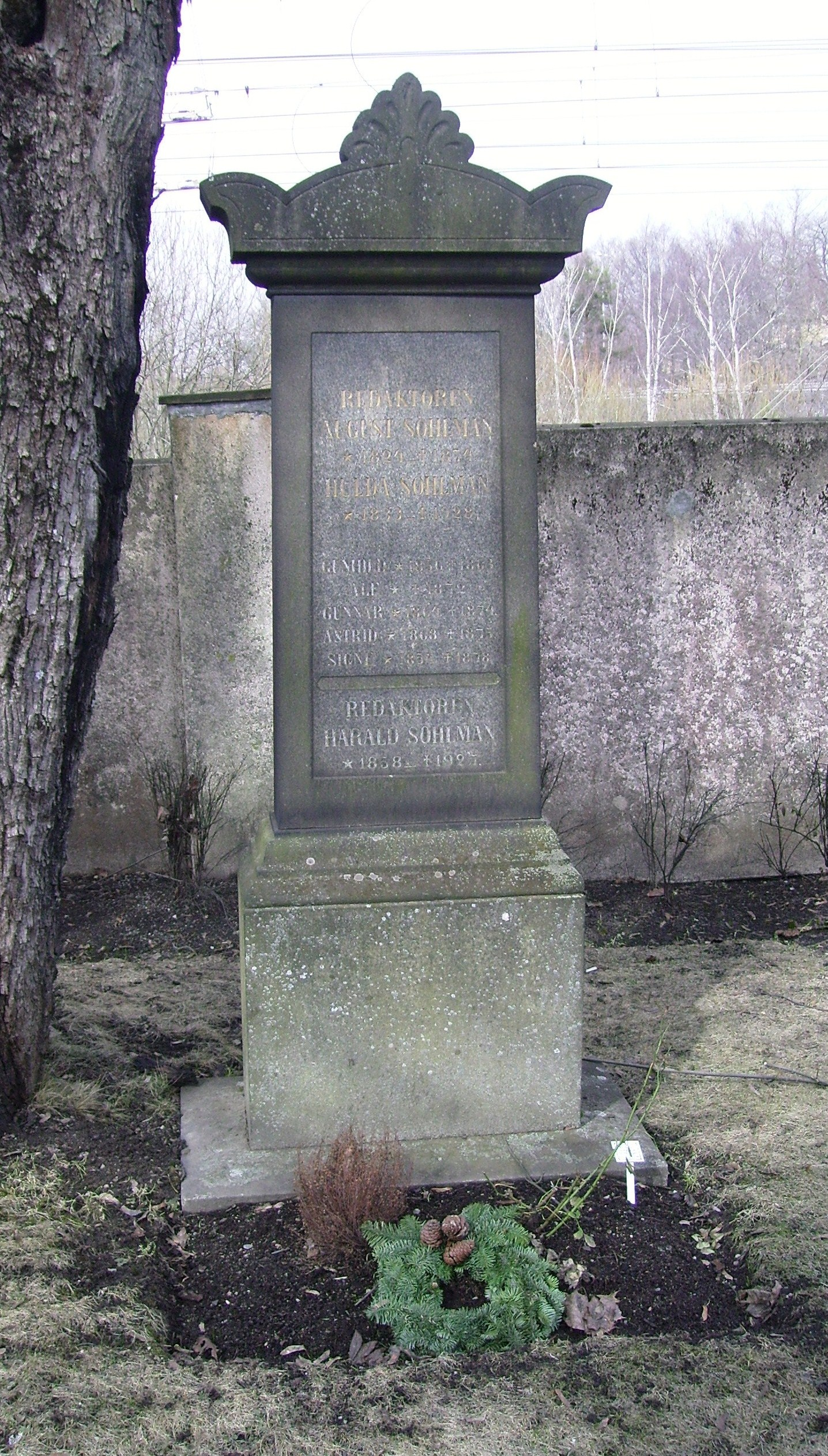
Harald Sohlman's grave at Huddinge cemetery

Harald Sohlman (24 January 1868 – 1 May 1927) was a Swedish publisher.

== Newspaperman ==
He was the son of the editor August Sohlman (1824–1874) and Hulda Sandeberg. Sohlman attended the school Bekowska skolan and graduated in 1877 in Stockholm after his matriculation exam and began his studies in Uppsala. In 1886, he got his Bachelor of Law degree at Uppsala university. There, he became known as a liberal, for example by being one of the founders of the student fraternity Verdandi Association. In 1886 he was acting notary at Stockholm City Court and in 1889 at Svea Court of Appeal. Between 1889 and 1890, he gave lectures on law at Stockholm workers' association.

In 1886, Sohlman started working at Aftonbladet. He had two family ties to the paper: first, he was the son of the previous editor, secondly, he was first cousin once removed from the head of the board for Aftonbladet, J.W. Smitt. When he began working as editor in chief, the paper's circulation was 13,000. He was the paper's editor in chief between 1890 and 1921 as well as director of publication; between 1896 and 1912 he was also the editor in chief for Dagen (1896-1920). In 1907, the ownership of Aftonbladet transitioned from the married couple Gustaf Retzius and Anna Hierta-Retzius to the brothers Harald and Arvid Sohlman. Harald promised Retzius that he would work for the good of the motherland and against socialism. From 1907, he was chairman of the Swedish telegraph agency; he was also chairman of the Publicists' club (Swedish: Publicistklubben) for many years.

He turned Aftonbladet into one of the biggest liberal papers during the tail end of the 19th century and the start of the 20th century. Between 1892 and 1905, he was the chairman of the Association against food tariffs. (During the tariff disputes, he was a fierce opponent to the protectionists.) Aftonbladet was seen as a political outlet for Karl Staaff's government during its first term (1905 to 1906). Because of his passionate interest in the issue of defense, and his dislike of socialism, he eventually drifted to the right on the political spectrum. Because of his hostile attitude towards Norway's ambitions for independence, he was never invited to join the Left-wing press association. In particular, the leadership of Dagens Nyheter and Aftonbladet exchanged strong words. On the other hand, social democratic editors were not invited either. After the 1905 crisis in the union with Norway, the paper became increasingly nationalistic with Sohlman as editor in chief. He was a proponent of a proportional electoral system, while majority voting in single mandate constituencies was the official party line for the liberal party leadership. After the return of Staaff in 1911, and under the influence by the Courtyard Crisis in the spring of 1914, he left the National liberal association and supported the political right from then on.

Sohlman was the chairman of the Stockholm shooting federation between 1907 and 1916 and vice chairman of Stockholm's militia federation between 1912 and 1926. In 1912, he initiated the Nordic capital cities' shooting competitions.

In 1915, during the First World War, he and his brother Arvid Sohlman sold the paper to the Germans in order to allow them to spread German propaganda in Sweden. The Sohlman brothers pledged their stocks in exchange for a large sum of money. The deal was long kept secret. Knut Agathon Wallenberg and Torvald Höjer, head of the foreign ministry's press agency, contacted Sohlman among others with criticism that blamed Russia and the tsar for starting the war. During Sohlman's time at the paper, it was also a body for pro-Finnish forces starting with the period of Russification of Finland. He was awarded the Order of the Cross of Liberty, 2nd class, in 1918. In 1921, Aftonbladet and Dagen returned to Swedish ownership.

As of 1917, he was married to Magda Leidesdorff, in her second marriage.

Ironically, he died on May 1 after falling down from his fourth-floor balcony, on International Workers' Day. His grave can be found in Huddinge graveyard southwest of Stockholm.

Erik Palmstierna describes him: ”Sohlman appeared to have been forgotten since the 60s. A true patriot and guild brother, lover of shooting, and everything that the worker meant with the term 'Philistine', but a great and harmless man of honor.” –Palmstierna, 1950
