= Dagen (1896–1920) =

Swedish newspaper (1896–1920)

Dagen (1896-1920)
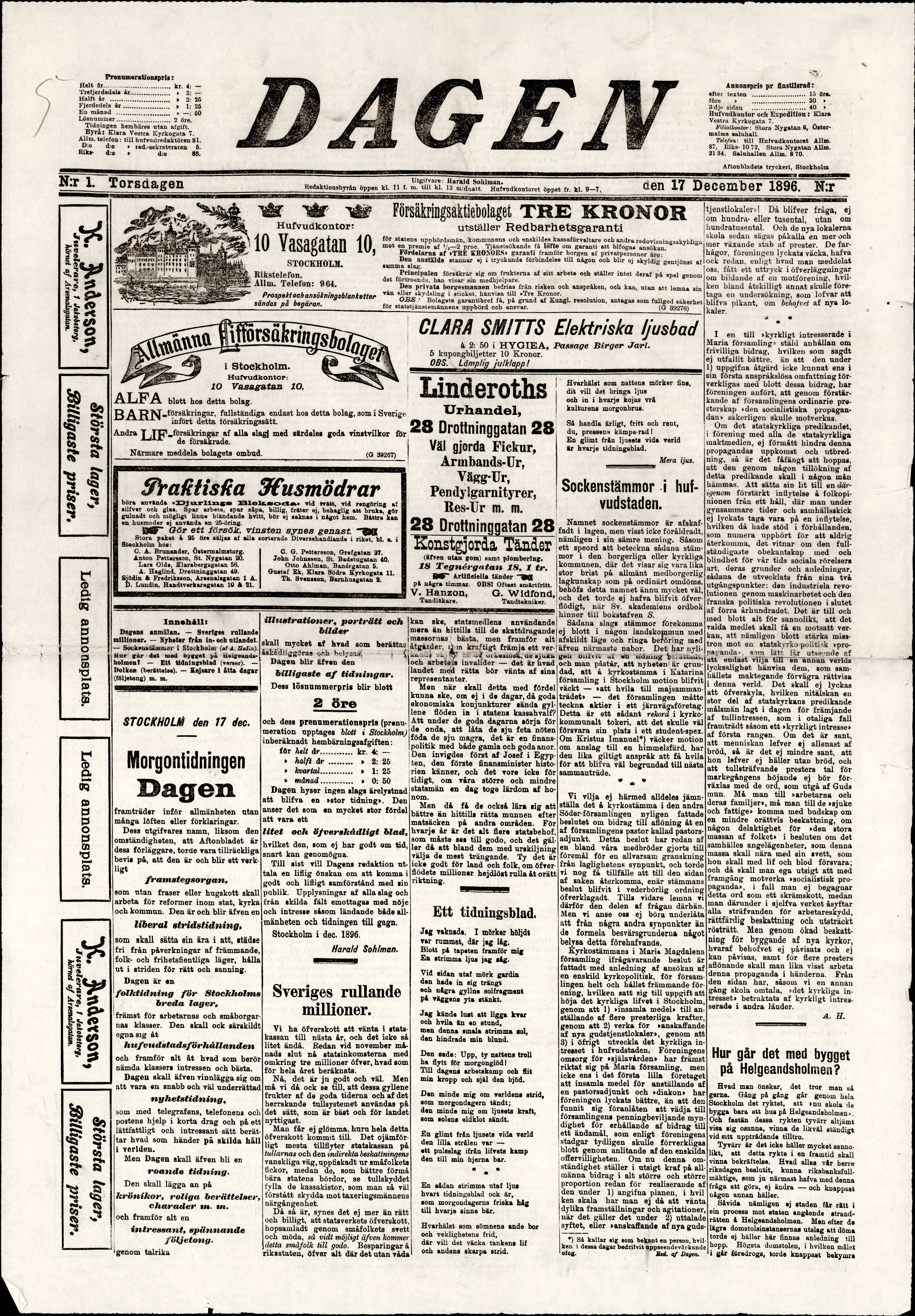
- First page of Dagen dated 1896
- Editor: Harald Sohlman
- Founded: 1896
- Ceased publication: 1920
- Headquarters: Stockholm

Dagen was a Swedish newspaper published in 1896–1920. It began to be published in Stockholm in December 1896 as a cheap newspaper, publishing daily with an evening edition starting in 1905. Its owner was the publishing company of Aftonbladet, and both papers had a common editor-in-chief, administration and office, but Dagen had its own editorial office.

Harald Sohlman was the editor-in-chief from January 1898 to 1 August 1905 with D. Bergström as "assistant editor". The newspaper's position coincided with Aftonbladet's. Regular employees at the paper include T. Blanche, A. Runström and E. Svensén.

The annual subscription price in Stockholm was SEK 6, and SEK 5.50 in rural areas. Starting in December 1905, a special rural edition was also published, but it was withdrawn at the same time the newspaper began to publish an evening edition, which, like the morning edition, was intended for both Stockholm and the countryside. The single-issue price was initially 2 öre, but was raised in March 1901 to 3 öre. The format was gradually expanded from 5- to 8-column. The advertising price was in both editions together was SEK 1 per cm. before the text 80 öre per cm. after. Both editions totaled around 30,000 copies. The subscription price SEK 6, adjusted for inflation between 1897 and 2020, would be equivalent to € 38 / year in 2020.

In 1913, a special company was formed for the continued publication of the newspaper. It was moved to Malmö in 1916, where it was published under the name of Skånetidningen Dagen by another new company, "Skånetidningen Dagens a.-b.", until it was closed down at the end of 1920.
