= Thorvaldsensfélagið =

Icelandic women's organization founded 1875

Thorvaldsensfélagið was an Icelandic women's organization, founded in Reykjavík in 1875. It has been called the first women's organization in Iceland.

It was a charity organization for wealthy women. Þórunn Jónassen was its first chair from 1875 to 1922. It also engaged in women's rights, especially women's education.

In 1877–1904, the organization managed the Thorvaldsensfélag Handavinnuskóli, where women philanthropists taught girls handicrafts, as well as a Sunday school with theoretical subjects, in a time period when there was yet no school for girls in Iceland.
