= Bríet Bjarnhéðinsdóttir =

Icelandic advocate for women's liberation and suffrage (1856–1940)

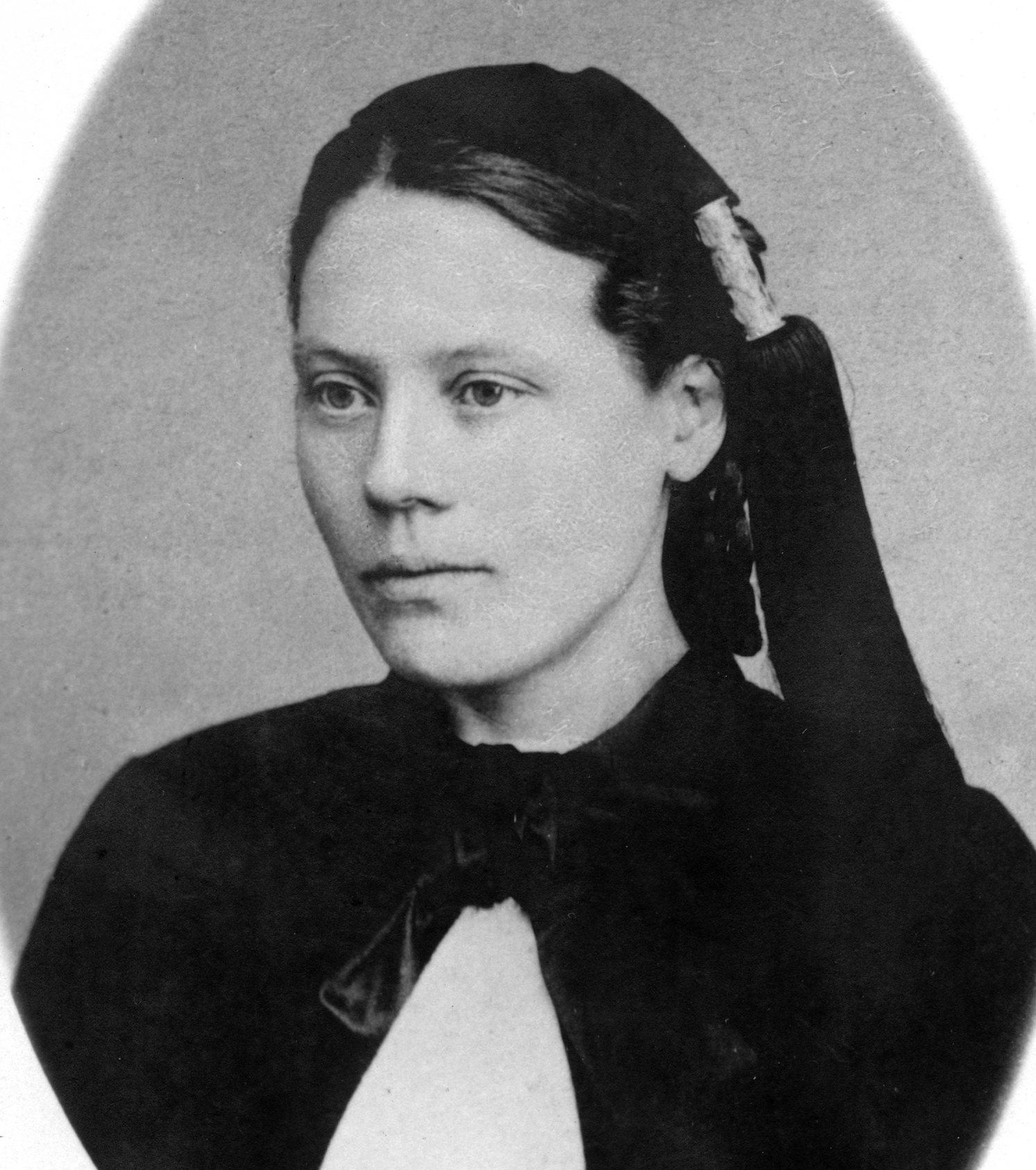
- Briet Bjarnhedinsdottir, late 1880s
- Born: September 27, 1856; Haukagili í Vatnsdal, Austur-Húnavatnssýsla, Iceland
- Died: March 16, 1940 (aged 83); Reykjavík, Kingdom of Iceland
- Political party: Home Rule Party
- Spouse: Valdimar Ásmundsson (m. 1888; died 1902)
- Children: Laufey Valdimarsdóttir, Héðinn Valdimarsson

Bríet Bjarnhéðinsdóttir

Bríet Bjarnhéðinsdóttir (September 27, 1856 – March 16, 1940) was an early Icelandic advocate for women's liberation and women's suffrage. She founded the first women's magazine in Iceland, Kvennablaðið. For a period of time she served on the Reykjavík city council.

== Life ==
Bríet, an educated school teacher, graduated from a women's school in 1880 and began working in Reykjavík from 1887. From 1885, she wrote various articles for women's rights under the signature AESA, and after she moved to the capital she held speeches for women's rights. In 1888, she married the liberal editor Valdimar Ásmundsson. She founded a women's society (1894), managed a women's magazine (1895–1926), co-founded a journalist's society (1897) and managed a children's magazine (1898–1903).

In 1902 and 1904 Bríet visited the US, Denmark, Norway, and Sweden, which made her aware of the international women's movement. In 1906 she attended the International Women's Suffrage Conference in Copenhagen, and was encouraged by Carrie Chapman Catt to found a women's suffrage society in Iceland. In 1907 she founded the first women's suffrage society in Iceland, Kvenréttindafélag Íslands and served as its president in 1907–1911 and 1912–1927. Bríet Bjarnhéðinsdóttir belonged to the first group of women to be elected to the Reykjavík city council, where she served in 1908–1912 and 1914–1920. In 1916, and again in 1926 she unsuccessfully ran for Althingi, the parliament of Iceland.

Her daughter, Laufey Valdimarsdóttir, was a notable lawyer.
