= Eiman Kanjo =

English Syrian computer scientist

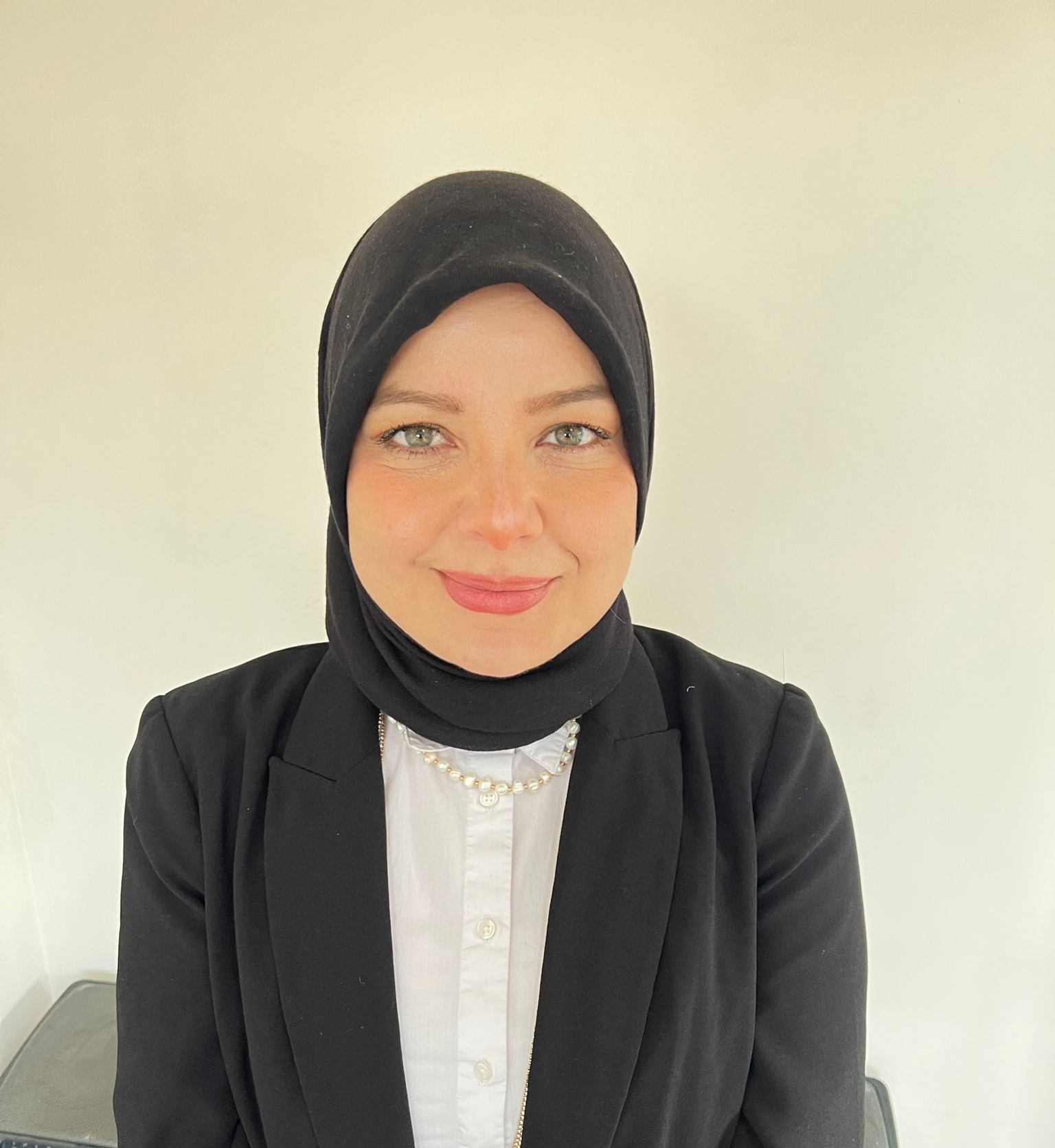
- Education: University of Cambridge
- Scientific career
- Workplaces: Nottingham Trent University; Imperial College London; University of Nottingham; University of Cambridge
- Thesis: Vision-based interactive toys environment

Eiman Kanjo (Arabic: إيمان كنجو) is a British computer scientist and engineer. She is professor of pervasive sensing at Nottingham Trent University. Her research considers the development of wireless sensing technologies. She was named as one of the Top 50 Influential Women in Engineering in 2022. She joins Imperial College London as Provost's Visiting Professor, October 2023.

== Early life and education ==
Eiman received a bachelor's degree in Computer and Electronic engineering from the University of Aleppo, Syria. Her doctorate considered vision-based interactive toys. After earning her doctorate, Kanjo moved to the University of Nottingham, where she developed mobile sensing technologies, which harnessed the power of smart phones to track health, social and environmental information. She continued to build smart sensing devices at the University of Cambridge.

== Research and career ==
Her sensors can be attached to the smart phones of cyclists to monitor air pollution uncover the environmental contributors to asthma attacks and monitor how the hustle and bustle of cities impacts physical health. However, she warned against the damaging impacts of smartphones, explaining that notifications can cause a downturn in mood

Kanjo developed a platform, Tag With Me, that provided location-based guidance and an interactive treasure hunt to allow visitors to explore parks and cultural destinations. Tag With Me was used by the Sherwood Forest in their 5G Connectivity project.

She believes her smart sensor networks could be used to monitor mental health in real time, and argued that digital platforms could have helped people find support during the COVID-19 pandemic.

In 2022, Kanjo was named as one of the Top 50 Influential Women in Engineering. She moved to Imperial College London as a visiting professor in 2023.

== Awards and honours ==
- 2021 Vice-chancellor's Outstanding Researcher Team Award
- 2022 Top 50 Influential Women in Engineering

== Select publications ==
- Eiman Kanjo (20 November 2009). "NoiseSPY: A Real-Time Mobile Phone Platform for Urban Noise Monitoring and Mapping". Mobile Networks and Applications. 15 (4): 562–574. doi:10.1007/s11036-009-0217-y. ISSN 1383-469X. Wikidata Q59586689.
- Eiman Kanjo; Eman M.G. Younis; Chee Siang Ang (September 2019). "Deep learning analysis of mobile physiological, environmental and location sensor data for emotion detection". Information Fusion. 49: 46–56. doi:10.1016/j.inffus.2018.09.001. ISSN 1566-2535. Wikidata Q59586667.
- Daria J Kuss; Eiman Kanjo; Mark Crook-Rumsey; Fraenze Kibowski; Grace Y Wang; Alex Sumich (2018). "Problematic Mobile Phone Use and Addiction Across Generations: the Roles of Psychopathological Symptoms and Smartphone Use". Journal of technology in behavioral science. 3 (3): 141–149. doi:10.1007/s41347-017-0041-3. ISSN 2366-5963. PMC 6133055. PMID 30238057. Wikidata Q59586668.
