= David Petley =

British academic

4th Vice-Chancellor of Nottingham Trent University
- Incumbent
- Assumed office 2025
- Preceded by: Edward Peck

10th Vice-Chancellor of the University of Hull
- In office 2022–2025
- Preceded by: Susan Lea

Personal details
- Education: King's College London; University College London

David Neil Petley (born 30 May 1968) is an earth scientist who is Vice-Chancellor of Nottingham Trent University. He was previously Vice-Chancellor of the University of Hull from 2022 to 2025, and Vice President for Innovation at the University of Sheffield.

== Early life ==
He grew up on Amherst Road in Kenilworth, the son of Mr DJ Petley. His elder sister Catherine went to The King's High School for Girls, and gained Physics, Chemistry, Biology A-levels in 1984.

He was awarded a RAF sixth form scholarship, alongside Air Vice-Marshal Peter J. M. Squires from Stratford, both at Warwick School. He was awarded a RAF university bursary to study aeronautical engineering at the University of Manchester.

Petley has a BSc in geography from King's College London (1990) and a PhD in earth sciences from University College London.

== Career ==
He worked as a lecturer at the University of Sunderland and later at the University of Portsmouth. In 2000 he moved to the University of Durham where he established the Institute for Hazard, Risk and Resilience; in 2012 he became Dean of Research at Durham and also Dean of Global Engagement. Following a move to the University of East Anglia, he was appointed Pro-Vice-Chancellor for Research and Enterprise. In 2016 he was appointed to a similar role at the University of Sheffield; he became vice-president for Innovation at the same university in 2020. He resigned, effective in August 2022, from the University of Sheffield. In June 2025, Petley was announced as the new Vice-Chancellor of Nottingham Trent University.

== Interests ==
Petley's major research interest is landslides, and in particular their mechanics, via both laboratory modelling and monitoring in the field. He has also worked extensively on the human and economic costs of landslides.
