= Nottingham Trent University =

Public research university in England

Coordinates: 52°57′23″N 1°09′07″W

- Coat of Arms
- Motto: Shaping Futures
- Type: Public research university
- Established: 1843 – Nottingham Government School of Design; 1970 – Trent Polytechnic; 1988 – Nottingham Polytechnic; 1992 – Nottingham Trent University
- Affiliations: EQUIS; ERASMUS; AMBAs; AACSB; ACU; EUA; Universities UK
- Endowment: £17.3 million (2025)
- Budget: £387.9 million (2024/25)
- Chancellor: Sir John Peace
- Vice-Chancellor: Dave Petley
- Administrative staff: 3,430
- Students: 35,435 (2024/25)
- Undergraduates: 29,865 (2024/25)
- Postgraduates: 5,575 (2024/25)
- Location: Nottingham and London, England, UK
- Campus: Urban, Suburban, Semirural, Rural
Colours
- Mascot: Trent Tiger
- Website: ntu.ac.uk
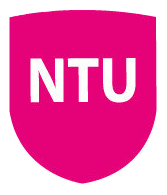

Nottingham Trent University (NTU) is a public research university located in Nottingham, England, which lies along the River Trent. Its origins date back to the establishment of the Nottingham Government School of Design in 1843, one of the earliest institutions of its kind in the United Kingdom. The university assumed its current status in 1992.

NTU operates across multiple campuses, including sites in the City Centre, Clifton, and Brackenhurst near Southwell, with an additional campus in London. Its academic activities are organised into seven schools spanning creative, professional, scientific, and environmental disciplines. With a student population exceeding 35,000, Nottingham Trent University is the sixth-largest university in the UK by total enrolment. In recent years, the university has received various awards, including the Times Higher Education University of the Year award in 2017 and The Guardian University of the Year in 2019. It is a member of sector bodies including the European University Association, Association of Commonwealth Universities, Universities UK, Association of MBAs, and Association to Advance Collegiate Schools of Business.

Additionally, the university owns and operates key cultural assets in Nottingham, including Bonington Gallery, a public contemporary art gallery based within the City campus, Metronome, a specialist venue for music and live events and Nottingham Conference Centre.

Nottingham Trent University and its predecessor institutions count among their alumni prominent figures in public life, business, the creative industries, academia, and professional sport in the United Kingdom and internationally. As of 2026, academic staff at Nottingham Trent University include fellows of the British Academy, the Academy of Social Sciences, the Royal Society, the Royal Society of Chemistry and the Royal Society of Biology.

== History ==
=== Foundation ===
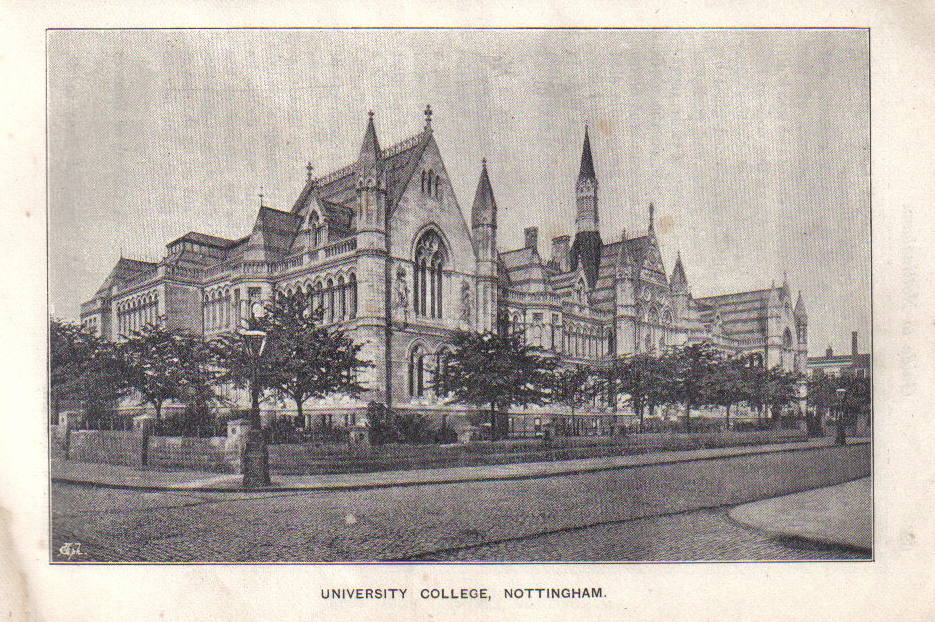
University College Nottingham in 1897; the building is now known as the Arkwright Building.

Nottingham Trent University was formed by the amalgamation of several institutions of higher education in Nottingham. Its earliest origins lie in the Nottingham Government School of Design, founded in 1843, during a period when government-supported art and design education was promoted to support industry and manufacturing. The School of Design continued to operate through successive institutional changes and remains part of the university.

=== Expansion and consolidation (1945–1970) ===
Following the Second World War, higher education provision in Nottingham expanded significantly in response to increased demand for technical and professional training. In 1945, the Nottingham and District Technical College was established. This was followed by the opening of the Nottingham Regional College of Technology in 1958, and the Nottingham College of Education at Clifton in 1959, which focused primarily on teacher training.

In 1964, the Nottingham Regional College was opened, and in 1966 the original Nottingham College of Design was formally linked with the Regional College. These developments reflected national efforts to rationalise and expand further education and technical colleges during the post-war period.

=== Polytechnic era (1970–1992) ===
In 1970, the merged institutions were granted polytechnic status, becoming Trent Polytechnic. As a polytechnic, the institution played a significant role in vocational and professional higher education, in line with the national mission of polytechnics to widen access to higher education and strengthen links with industry and professional practice.

During the 1970s Nottingham Polytechnic gained national recognition for its photography education, particularly through collaboration with Derby College of Art. Under the leadership of Bill Gaskins, who joined the Polytechnic from Derby in 1971, and with the involvement of photographers such as Raymond Moore, the programme became influential within British photographic education. Figures such as Ifor Thomas were also nationally influential during this period.

In 1975, Trent Polytechnic amalgamated with the Nottingham College of Education, further consolidating its role in teacher training.

By the 1980s the Polytechnic was also well respected for its Higher Diploma and CNAA degree courses in law, engineering and the sciences, with a large new Life Sciences block being built at the Clifton Campus in 1983.

The institution was renamed Nottingham Polytechnic in 1988.

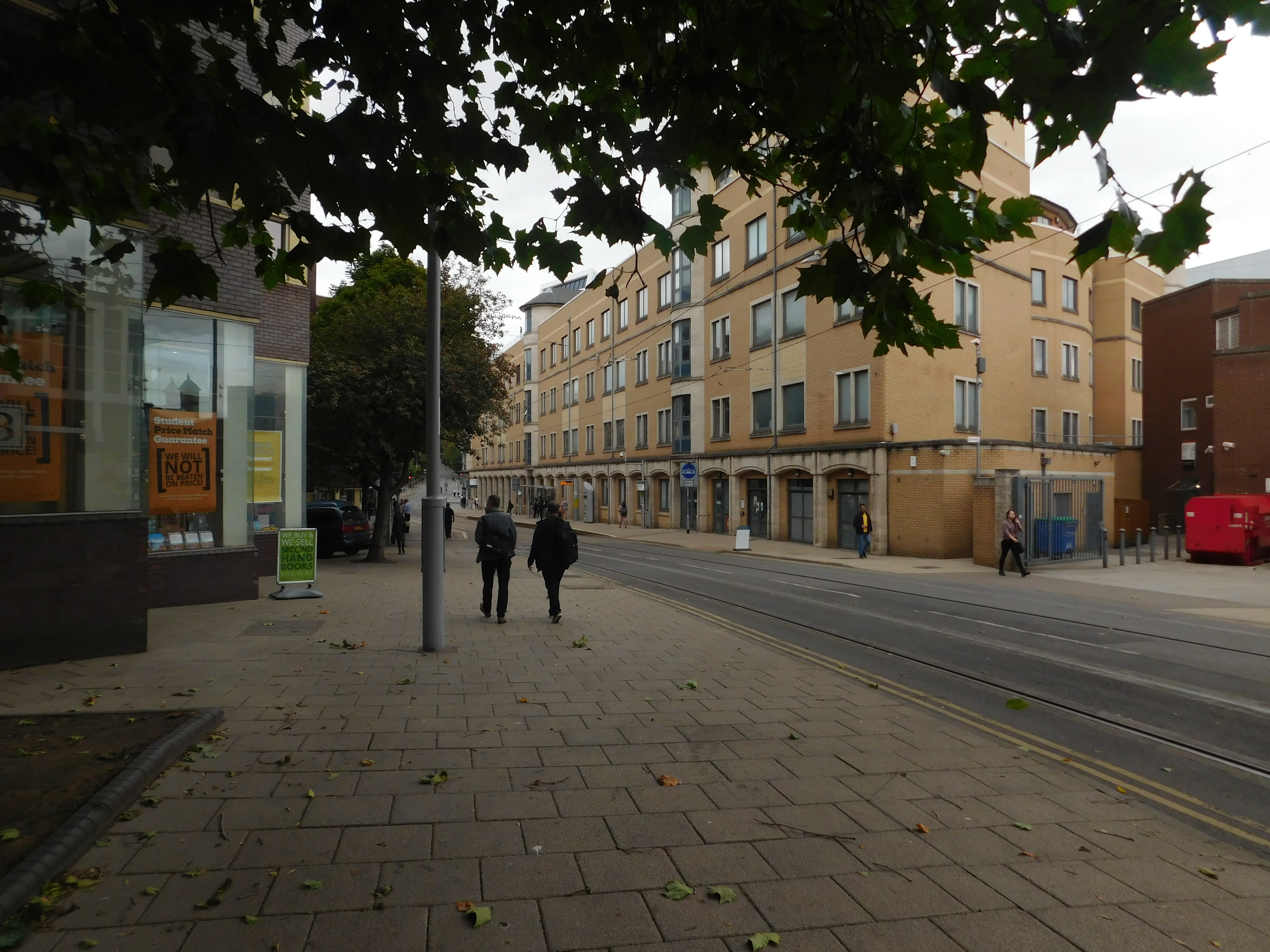
Campus Life on Goldsmith Street

=== Teacher training ===
Teacher training formed a substantial part of the Polytechnic’s provision during the post-war decades, reflecting national demand following the expansion of compulsory education. In the late 1970s, however, declining birth rates led to a reduction in teacher training places across England. While Eaton Hall Teacher Training College initially remained part of Trent Polytechnic, it subsequently closed in 1981.

In 1984, the National Centre for School Technology was established at the Polytechnic as part of the British School Technology scheme, under the direction of Geoffrey Shillito and Ron Denney. This later became the Trent International Centre for School Technology. The Technology Education Project, launched nationally in 1985, was jointly directed from the Polytechnic. In 1988, the Centre for Enterprise was established, hosting the five-year Enterprise for Higher Education initiative, aimed at encouraging collaboration between higher education and industry.

=== University status and subsequent development (1992–present) ===
Nottingham Trent University was granted university status in 1992 following reforms to UK higher education that enabled polytechnics to become universities. The institution adopted its current name the same year, succeeding Nottingham Polytechnic. Professor Ray Cowell was appointed as the university’s first Vice-Chancellor, overseeing the transition to university status and the consolidation of academic provision across its existing campuses.

On Friday 11 November 1994, Katharine, Duchess of Kent opened the School of Science. In 1997, the Nottingham Trent University Venture Capital Fund was set up with £500,000 from the European Union. In the 1990s, the Southampton Institute of Higher Education, had its degrees validated by NTU. From July 2005 this institute would become Southampton Solent University.

Like many UK universities, Nottingham Trent University has occasionally been the focus of public controversy and protest. Chairman of the university governors Sir David White, in the 1990s, was a friend of the Chancellor of the Exchequer and local Conservative MP Kenneth Clarke. Clarke was awarded an honorary degree in February 1996, which a high proportion of staff opposed, many in the NATFHE trade union. On Friday 17 May 1996, Clarke was given the degree at a ceremony. Around 200 angry chanting students gathered outside, with eight police officers present. There was an altercation between around 100 students and police, when Mr Clarke left the building. Clarke also presented the Harold Macmillan Memorial Lecture.

During the 1990s, the university undertook a period of early expansion. In 1999, the former Brackenhurst College was incorporated into Nottingham Trent University, becoming its third campus and extending the university’s provision in land-based, environmental, and agricultural disciplines.

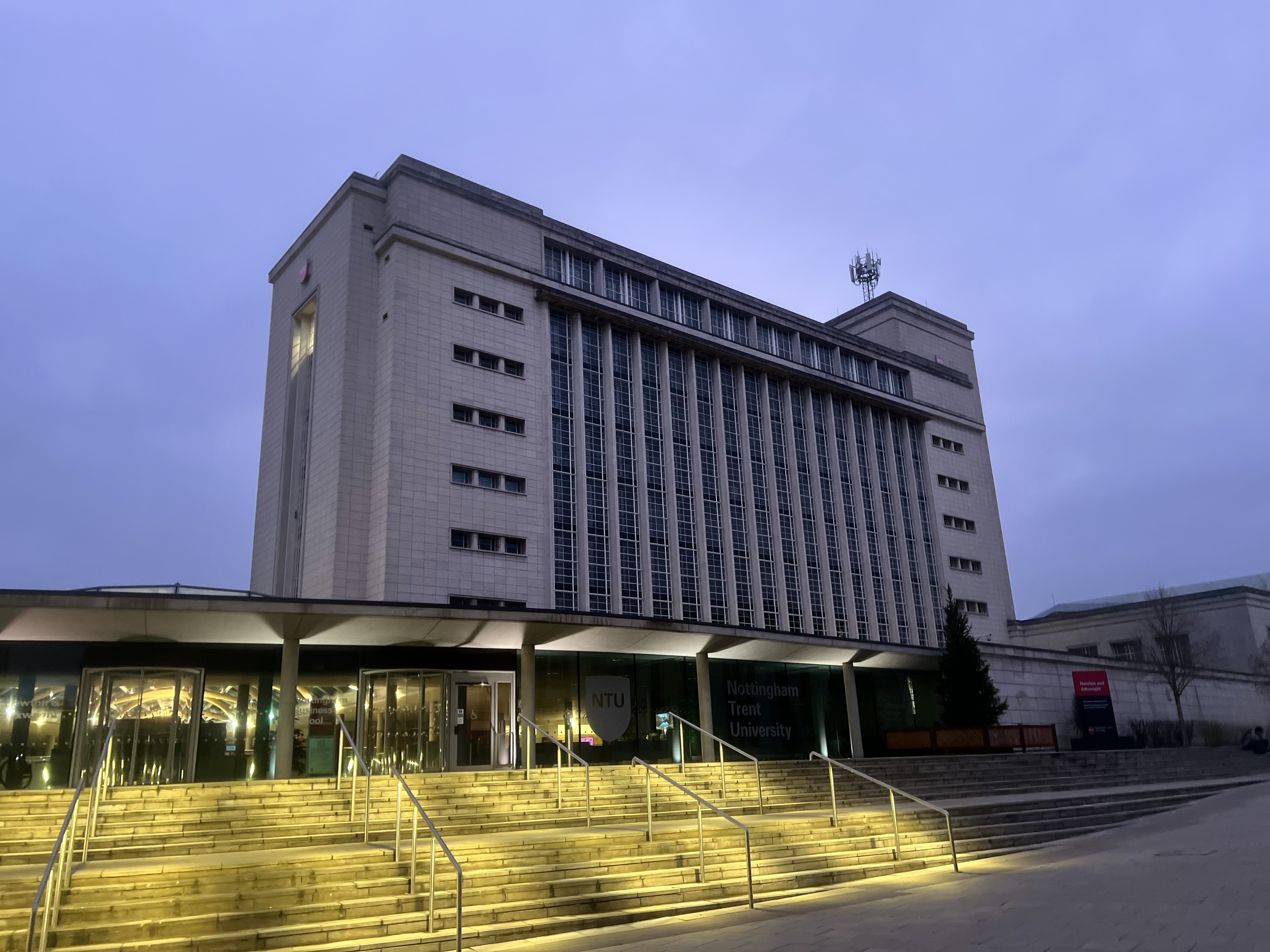
Newton Building, home to Nottingham Business School

In 2003, Professor Neil Gorman succeeded Ray Cowell as Vice-Chancellor, leading a phase of organisational consolidation and investment. In 2008, broadcaster and journalist Sir Michael Parkinson CBE was appointed as the university’s first Chancellor, a role intended to strengthen the institution’s public profile and external engagement.

Prince Andrew, Duke of York (later Andrew Mountbatten-Windsor) visited the teacher training campus on Thursday 26 April 2007. On Thursday 2 July 2015 Sophie, Countess of Wessex (later Duchess of Edinburgh) opened a Cell Therapy Centre, also on same campus

Further redevelopment of the City Campus took place in the early 2010s. In 2014, Olympic champion Sebastian Coe opened the new Students’ Union building, which formed part of wider campus investment projects aimed at expanding student facilities and accommodation. The same year, Professor Edward Peck was appointed Vice-Chancellor, succeeding Neil Gorman.

The university is also home to the Nottingham Creative Writing Hub, an initiative based within the School of Social Sciences that brings together students, staff and researchers in creative writing. The Hub supports the university’s undergraduate and postgraduate provision in creative writing, and is linked to the Centre for Research in Literature, Linguistics and Culture, facilitating collaboration, events and publication activities. In 2017, the university established Nottingham Civic Exchange, a university-based think tank intended to support research-informed policy engagement and place-based civic initiatives, with a focus on local and regional collaboration.

In June 2024, Nottingham Trent University hosted the final televised head-to-head debate of the 2024 United Kingdom general election campaign between Prime Minister Rishi Sunak and Labour leader Keir Starmer. The debate, broadcast nationally by the BBC, took place at the university’s Newton Building and formed part of the corporation’s wider election coverage. The event attracted significant national media attention and positioned the university as a focal point for political debate during the closing stages of the election campaign.

== Campuses ==
The university has five campuses: City, Clifton, Brackenhurst, NTU London and NTU in Mansfield.

=== City ===
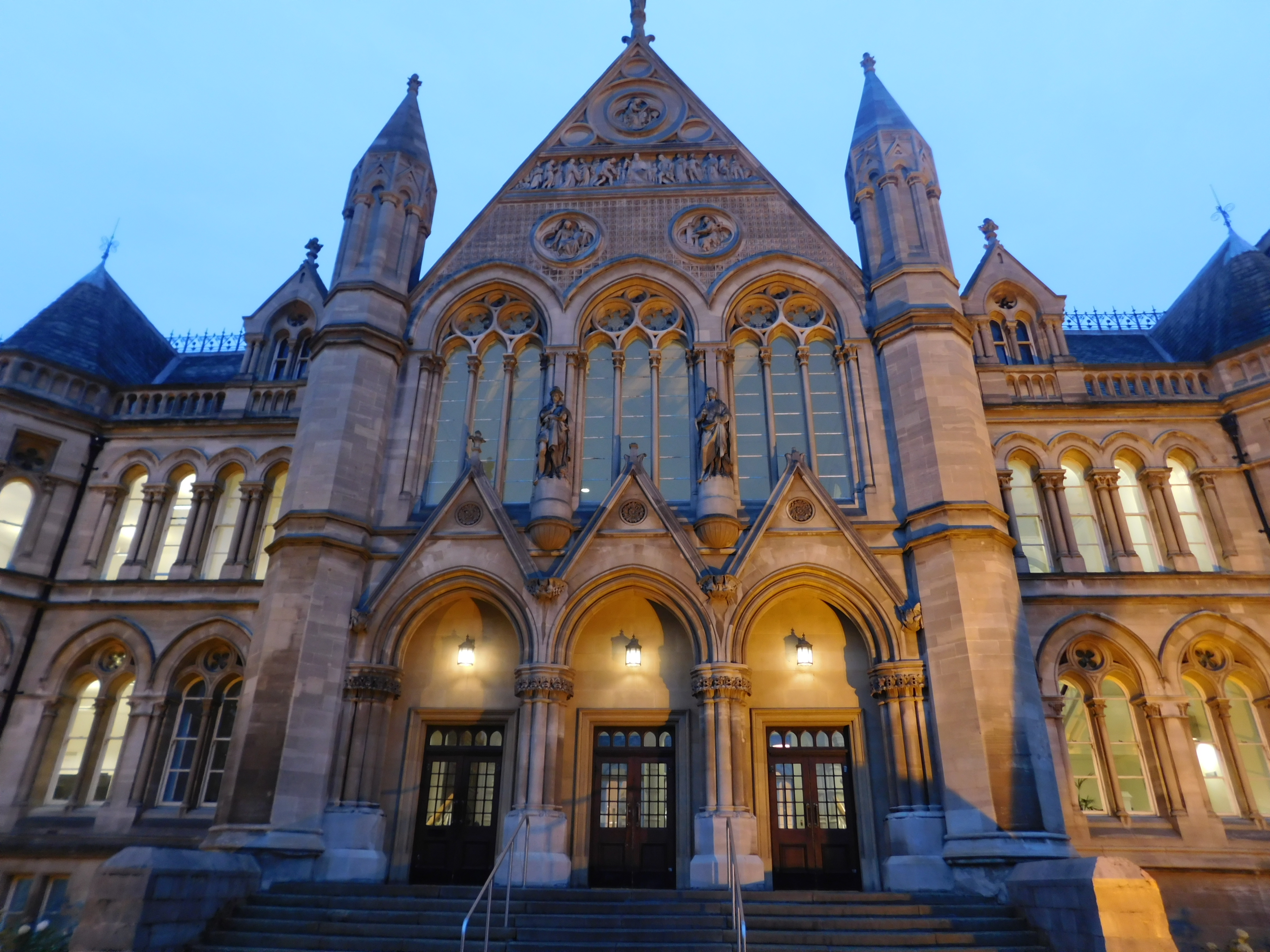
The Arkwright Building is Grade II listed

Located just north of Nottingham City Centre, the City site is home to over 17,000 students from Nottingham Business School, Nottingham Law School, School of Architecture, Design and the Built Environment, School of Art & Design, School of Social Sciences, and the Centre for Broadcasting & Journalism. The university's flagship buildings are the regenerated Newton and Arkwright, which are both Grade II listed buildings. The Arkwright Building, constructed between 1877 and 1881, features an elaborate Gothic architectural style with gables, arches, and pinnacles. It was originally home to University College Nottingham, as well as the city library and a natural history museum, and was described at the time as one of the finest public buildings in Nottinghamshire. The adjacent Newton Building was constructed between 1956 and 1958 during the expansion of the Nottingham and District Technical College. Designed in a distinctive mid-20th-century Art Deco style, it is one of the tallest buildings in Nottingham. The building was officially opened in June 1958 by Princess Alexandra of Kent and remains one of the university’s principal teaching and administrative buildings. On 18 May 2011, the two buildings were officially reopened by Sir David Attenborough.

The Boots Library is the main library of the university. It is in the centre of the city site and supports the schools of Architecture, Design and the Built Environment, Art & Design, Nottingham Business School, Nottingham Law School and Social Sciences. It is a purpose-built building, completed in 1998 at a total cost of £13m; with a refurbishment completed in summer 2013. It is set over four levels plus a further level dedicated to 24-hour computing facilities. There are branch libraries on the Clifton and Brackenhurst campuses serving the schools located there, and include additional Animal Planet digital facilities.

The Recent Advances in Manufacturing database (RAM) is published by the library and information department. It is a bibliographic indexing service providing information for manufacturing and related areas. Literature covered includes journals, magazines, books, videos, and conference proceedings with from 1990 to 2012.

=== Clifton ===
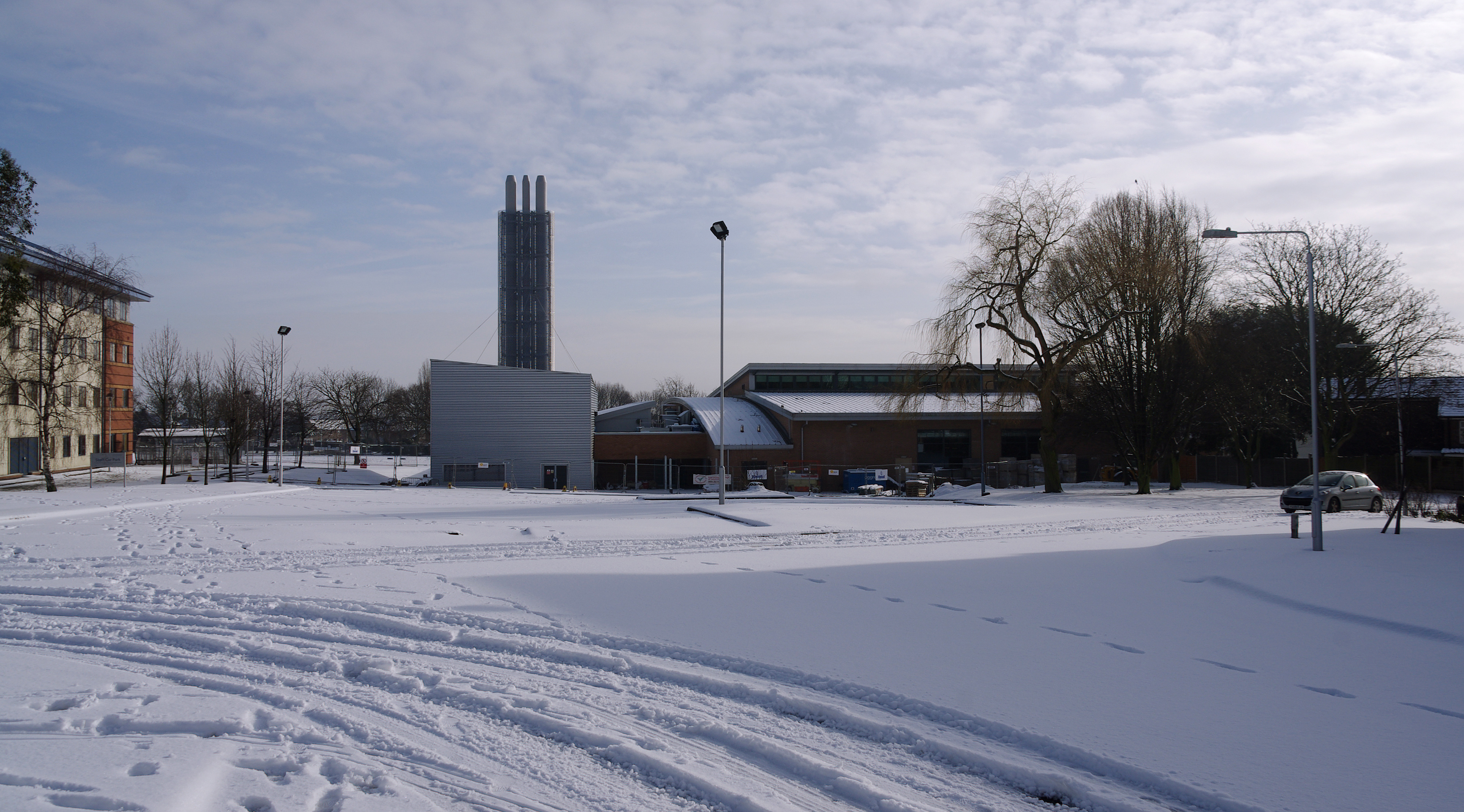
Clifton Campus

Clifton Campus is located approximately 4 miles (6 kilometres) south of Nottingham city centre and is one of Nottingham Trent University’s principal campuses. It is a largely self-contained campus, set within landscaped grounds, and is primarily associated with teaching and research in science, technology, engineering, health, and sport. The campus serves a student population of over 9,000, mainly from the School of Science and Technology.

The campus hosts several specialist research and teaching facilities, including the John van Geest Cancer Research Centre and an Anthony Nolan Trust Cord Blood Bank. It is also home to the Interdisciplinary Science and Technology Centre, a purpose-built facility supporting teaching in biosciences, chemistry, computer science, and sport science, developed through joint investment by the UK government and the university.

Clifton Campus includes extensive sports and fitness facilities, collectively known as the Clifton Sports Hub and Clifton Sports Village. These facilities support both recreational and performance sport and include sports halls, fitness and conditioning spaces, outdoor pitches, and specialist provision for sports science and therapy. The campus is also home to the university’s High Performance Centre, which supports athlete development.

The Trent Astronomical Observatory opened in 2006. The observatory is recognised by the International Astronomical Union and is used for undergraduate and postgraduate teaching, research projects, and public outreach activities, including open events and school engagement programmes.

=== Brackenhurst ===
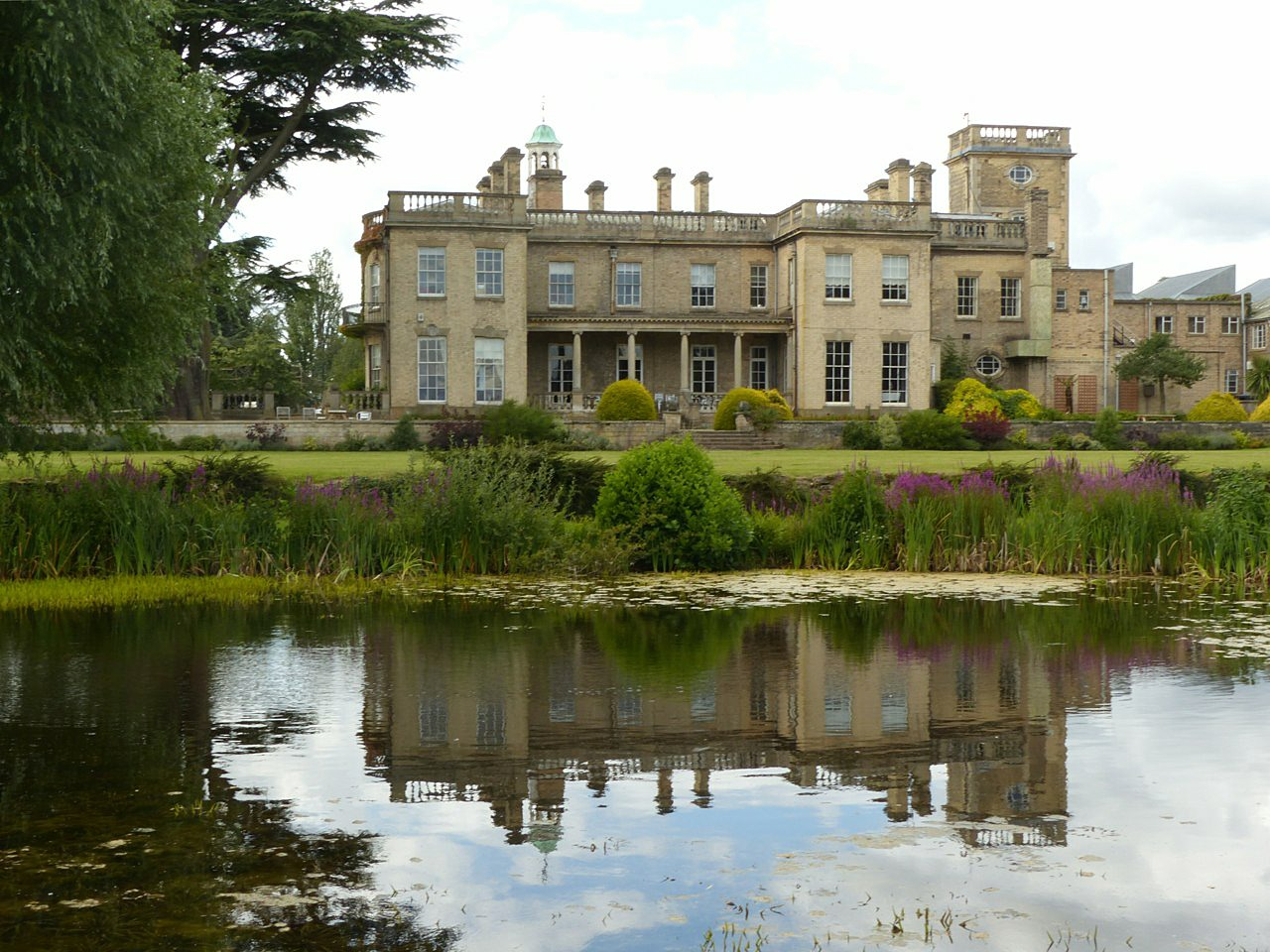
Brackenhurst Campus

Situated about 15 mi (24 km) from the city centre in the rural Southwell area, Brackenhurst campus is sited at the historic Brackenhurst Hall, a Grade II listed countryside estate containing woodland, farmland, lake, wetlands, and gardens (including a listed Heritage Site and Wetland Conservation Area). Contrasting with the country house built in 1828 are modern facilities such as the Lyth Building. The Veterinary Nursing Centre was purpose-built in 2007 and was made a RCVS accredited Veterinary Nursing Centre.

The campus includes a working farm, equestrian centre, glasshouses, vertical farming units, and scientific laboratories. The campus' 200-hectare farm and woodland estate houses over 250 animals from more than 70 species. Currently home to 1,700 students from the School of Animal, Rural and Environmental Sciences (including equine sciences and endangered species conservation), the campus was the site of the former Brackenhurst College which was dissolved in 1999 in favour of Nottingham Trent University.

=== Creative Quarter ===
The Creative Quarter campus, home to the Confetti Institute of Creative Technologies, is located a short walk east of the city centre on Convent Street. It is home to over 2000 students across its college and degree courses. The campus consists of the main Digital Media Hub on Convent Street, as well as Metronome (both a live music venue and a music studio complex) on Huntingdon Street, Confetti X (an Esports venue, also on Huntingdon Street), and Space 2 (a shared building that contains TV studios and related facilities) near Sneinton market. The institute, along with all its related businesses (collectively the Confetti Media Group), were bought by NTU in 2015.

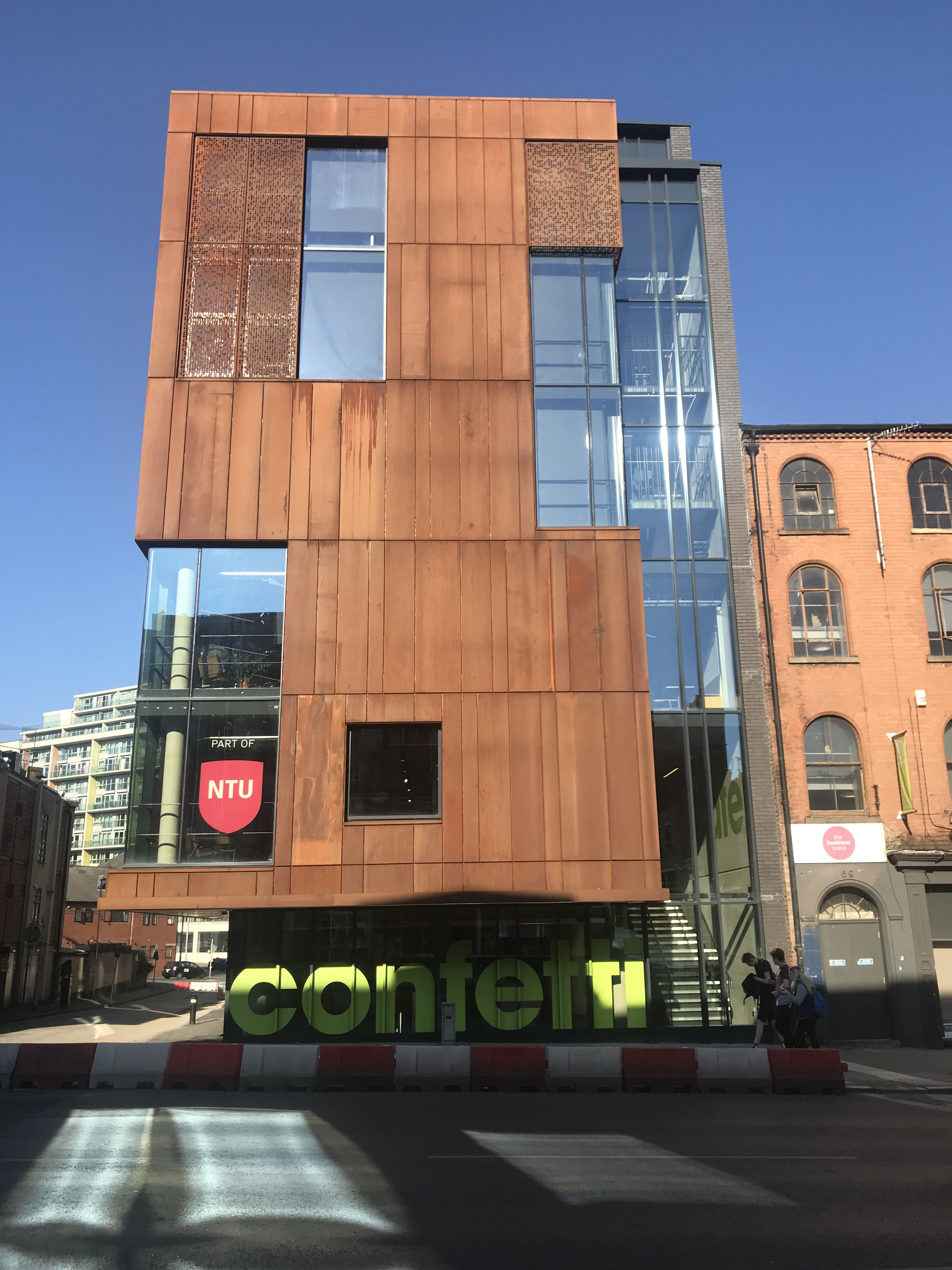
Confetti Institute

=== NTU London ===
Opened in September 2023, NTU London is located on Commercial Road in Whitechapel, London, and contains several music studios, a large social space, specialist teaching spaces, and a 450-capacity venue for live music, esports, and virtual production.

=== NTU in Mansfield ===
Nottingham Trent University (NTU) has collaborated with the West Nottinghamshire College University Centre to extend higher education provisions for Mansfield and Ashfield.

The £6.5 million University Centre was opened in 2016 to provide a range of programmes including full and foundation degrees and continue professional education. The University Centre is now known as NTU in Mansfield.

== Organisation and administration ==
=== Faculties ===
Nottingham Trent University is organised into a number of academic schools delivering teaching and research across creative, professional, scientific, and applied disciplines.

- School of Animal, Rural and Environmental Sciences

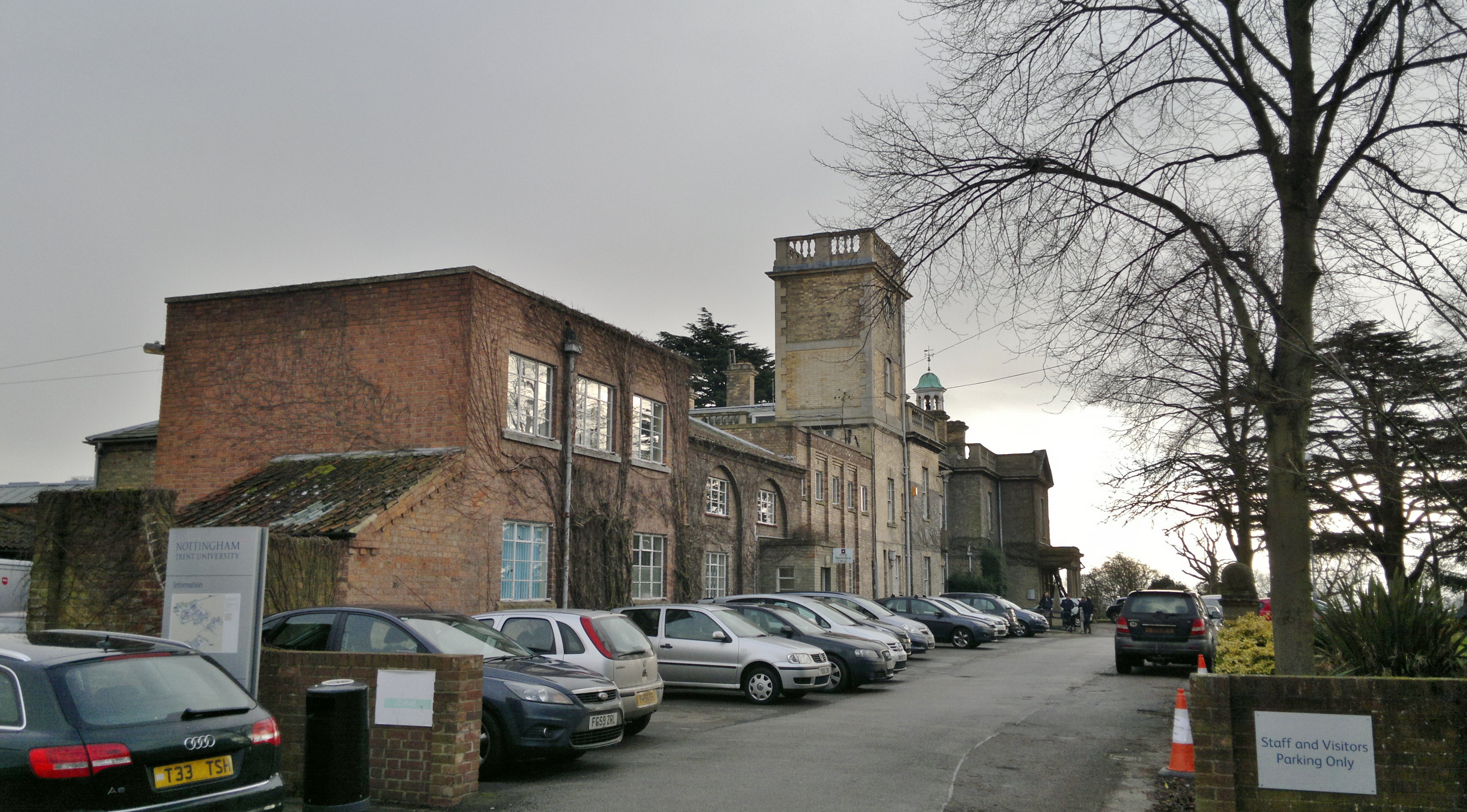
ARES facilities

The School of Animal, Rural and Environmental Sciences is based at the Brackenhurst Campus near Southwell, Nottinghamshire, and focuses on education and research in agriculture, animal and equine sciences, environmental management, ecology, food production, and sustainability-related fields.

- School of Architecture, Design and the Built Environment

The School of Architecture, Design and the Built Environment is based primarily at the City Campus and provides education and research in architecture, design, engineering, construction management, surveying, and property-related disciplines, combining creative and technical approaches to the built environment.

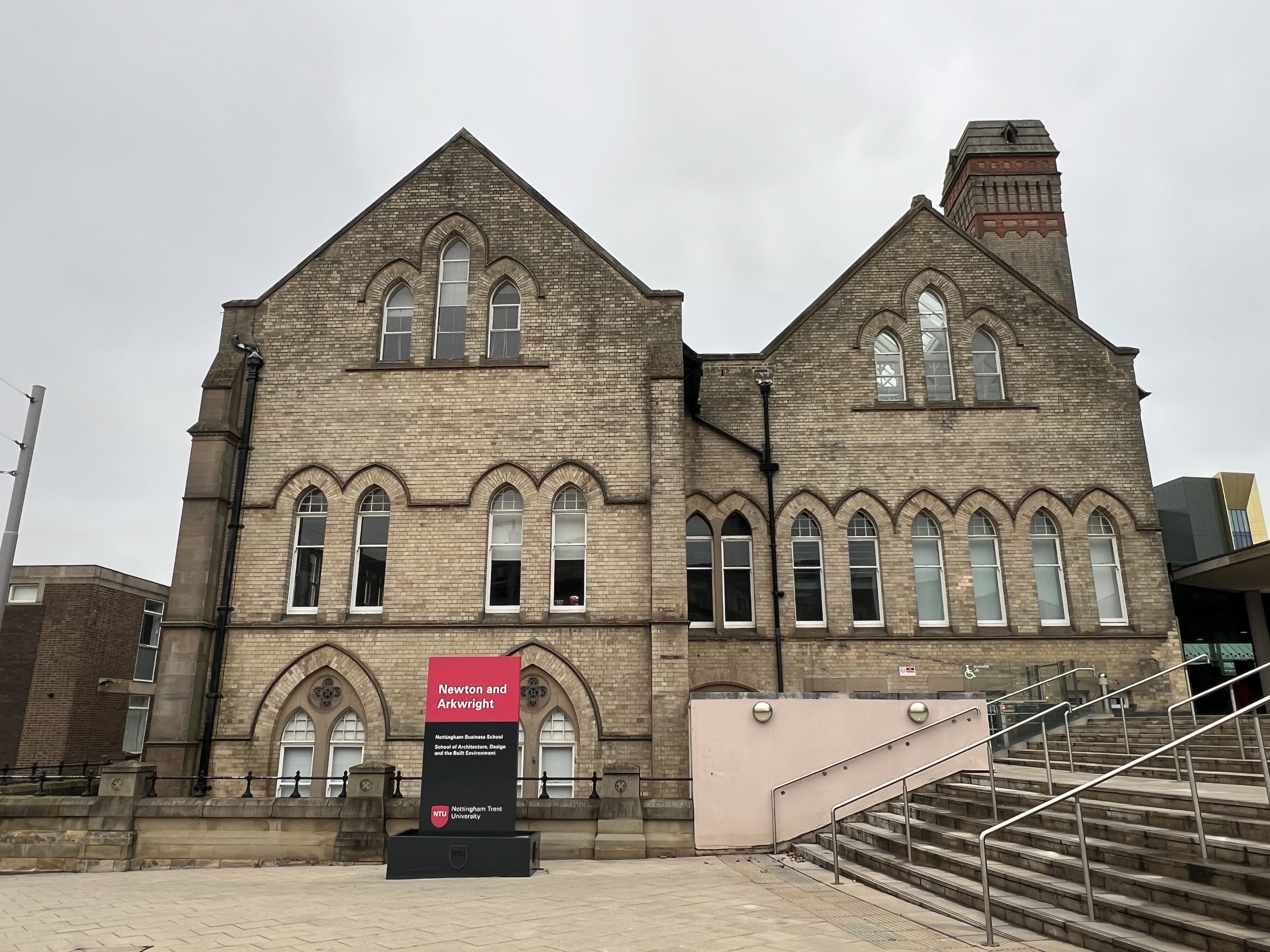
The School of Architecture, Design and the Built Environment

- Nottingham School of Art & Design

The School of Art & Design traces its origins to the Nottingham Government School of Design, founded in 1843. Based mainly at the City Campus, it delivers undergraduate and postgraduate education in fine art, fashion, textiles, graphic design, photography, and related creative disciplines.

- Nottingham Business School

Nottingham Business School provides education and research in business, management, economics, and finance. It is triple accredited by EQUIS, AACSB, and AMBA, placing it among a small number of business schools worldwide to hold all three major international accreditations.

- Nottingham Law School

Nottingham Law School is one of the United Kingdom’s largest law schools and delivers undergraduate, postgraduate, and professional legal education. A distinctive feature of the school is NLS Legal, an on-campus teaching law firm providing supervised, practice-based learning through real cases.

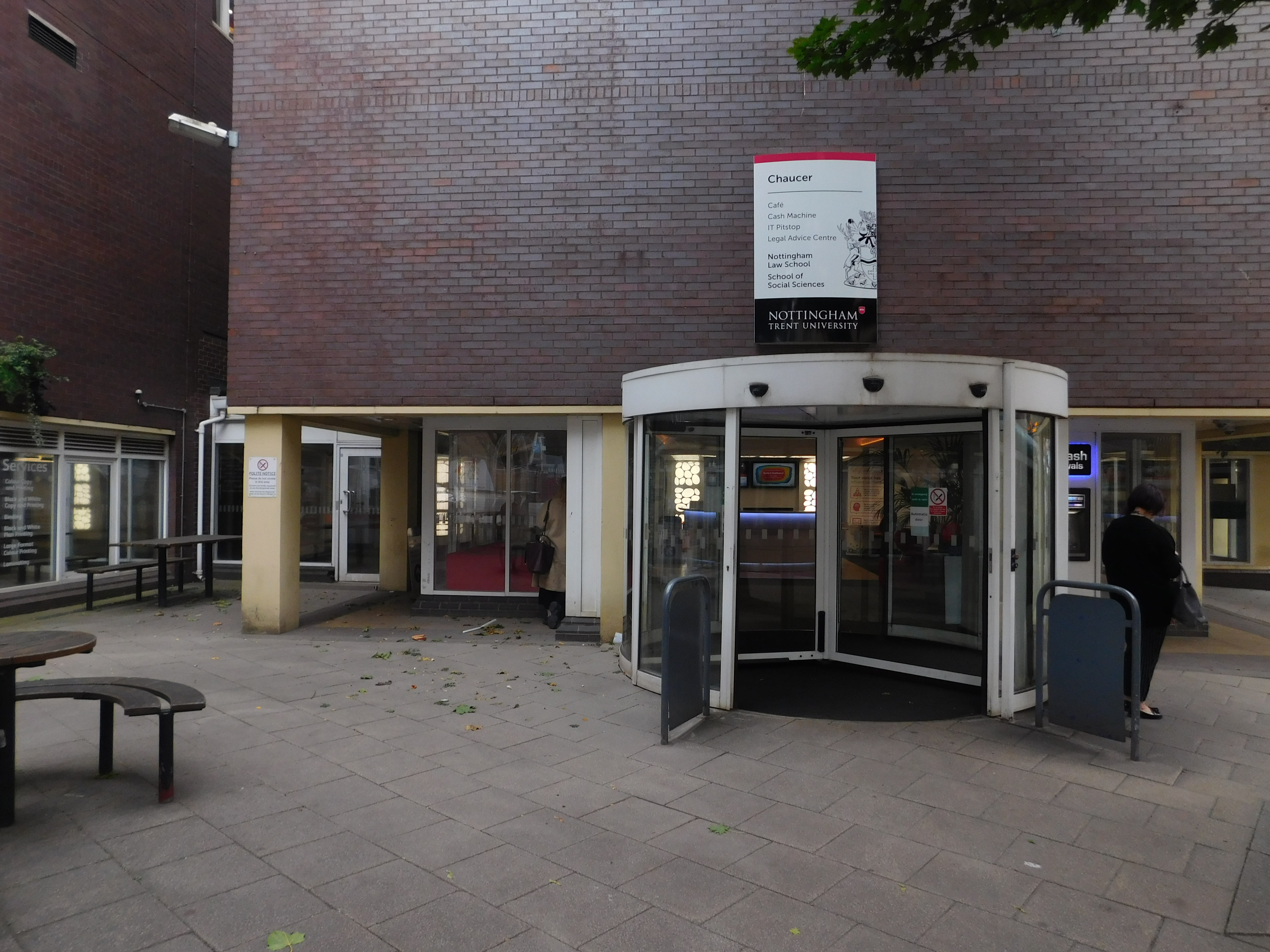
Entrance to Nottingham Law School and the School of Social Sciences

- School of Science and Technology

The School of Science and Technology delivers education and research across scientific and technical disciplines including biosciences, chemistry, computing, engineering, forensic science, mathematics, physics, and sport science, with activity centred primarily at the Clifton Campus.

- School of Social Sciences

The School of Social Sciences provides education and research in disciplines including criminology, psychology, sociology, politics, journalism and media, education, social work, health and allied professions, and languages, combining academic study with applied and professional practice.

- Confetti Institute of Creative Technologies

Confetti is a specialist creative education provider focusing on music, media, film, television, games, and live events. Established in 1994, Confetti became part of Nottingham Trent University in 2015.

=== Governance ===
The governance of Nottingham Trent University is exercised through three principal bodies: the University Executive Team, the Board of Governors and the Academic Board. Together, these bodies are responsible for the strategic direction, management and academic governance of the university.

The Chancellor is the ceremonial head of the university and undertakes duties including representing the institution at major events and conferring degrees at graduation ceremonies. The current Chancellor is Sir John Peace. In June 2008, Sir Michael Parkinson was named as the first Chancellor, responsible for a number of duties, including representing the university on special occasions and conferring degrees at graduation ceremonies (although he was absent from all the 2009 graduation ceremonies). The official installation as Chancellor of Nottingham Trent University took place in a special ceremony on Tuesday 11 November 2008, at the Royal Concert Hall, Nottingham.

The Vice-Chancellor and President is the chief executive officer of the university and is responsible for its overall leadership and management. The current Vice-Chancellor and President is Professor David Petley, who leads the University Executive Team.

The Board of Governors has overall legal and constitutional responsibility for the conduct of the university’s affairs in accordance with its Instrument and Articles of Government. It operates in line with recognised standards of corporate governance, including the Governance Code of Practice published by the Committee of University Chairs, and is supported by a number of committees.

The University Executive Team, led by the Vice-Chancellor, is responsible for the operational management of the university and the implementation of its strategic objectives. The Vice-Chancellor is accountable to the Board of Governors for the conduct of the university, including its academic direction, organisational management, financial planning and student discipline.

The Academic Board is the senior academic body of the university and is responsible for oversight of academic standards, learning and teaching, research and academic quality. It advises the Board of Governors on academic matters and is chaired by the Vice-Chancellor.

=== Chancellors ===
- Sir Michael Parkinson (2008–2014)
- Kevin Cahill (2014–2017)
- Sir John Peace (2017–present)

=== Vice-Chancellors ===
- Ray Cowell (1992–2003)
- Neil T. Gorman (2003–2014)
- Edward Peck (2014–2025)
- David Petley (2025–present)

=== Chairmen of the Board of Governors ===
- Sir John Peace (1999–2009)
- Neil Gaulden

=== Finances ===
In the financial year 2023–24, Nottingham Trent University reported total income of approximately £434 million, with the majority derived from teaching income (£378 million), primarily undergraduate and postgraduate tuition fees. Additional income streams included research income (£22 million), commercial research (£8 million), and other commercial activities. Total expenditure for the year was approximately £395 million, with significant spending on teaching delivery and support (£176 million), academic and support staff costs, campus operations and facilities, student wellbeing and support, and central operations.

The university reported earnings before interest, tax, depreciation and amortisation (EBITDA) of £39 million and invested £63 million in capital projects during the year, reflecting continued investment in estates, digital learning technologies, and infrastructure.

== Academic profile ==
=== Rankings and reputation ===
Rankings
National rankings
- Complete (2027): 46
- Guardian (2027): 28
- Times / Sunday Times (2027): 44

Global rankings
- ARWU (2026): 701–800
- QS (2027): 639=
- THE (2026): 601–650

Nottingham Trent University has received sustained national recognition in higher education awards. It was named University of the Year by Times Higher Education in 2017, and Modern University of the Year by The Times and The Sunday Times in both 2018 and again in 2022. In 2019, the university was awarded University of the Year by The Guardian.

Nottingham Trent University was ranked 25th in the UK by The Guardian in 2026. In the UK subject rankings, the university is currently ranked 2nd in forensic science, 4th in general engineering, 5th in pharmacology and pharmacy, 6th in childhood and youth, 9th in nutrition and food science, 10th in agriculture, 10th in creative writing, 11th in art and design, 16th in marketing and public relations, 17th in animation and game design, 19th in economics, 21st in journalism, and 23rd in fashion and textiles.

HESA Student Body Composition (2023/24)
Domicile and Ethnicity	Total
British White (Note: Not be confused solely with White British)	55%
British Ethnic Minorities (Note: Includes those who indicate that they identify as Asian, Black, Mixed Heritage, Arab or any other ethnicity except White.)	26%
International EU	1%
International Non-EU	17%
Undergraduate Widening Participation Indicators
Female	54%
Independent School	6%
Low Participation Areas (Note: Calculated from the Polar4 measure, using Quintile1, in England and Wales. Calculated from the Scottish Index of Multiple Deprivation (SIMD) measure, using SIMD20, in Scotland.)	16%

Nottingham Trent University achieved an Athena SWAN Bronze Award for good practices towards the advancement of gender equality in 2019. The university held a Gold rating in the UK Teaching Excellence Framework (TEF) for June 2017. In the 2023 TEF assessment, the university maintained its overall Gold rating.

In 2015, WhatUni ranked the university 12th in its 'Student Choice Awards'. In the same year, the Times Higher Education ranked the university as 31st out of 113 universities in the country for student experience. In November 2015, Nottingham Trent received the Queen's Anniversary Prize for Higher and Further Education in the Science and Mathematics category, repeated in 2021 for projects involving digital imaging of architecture and heritage sites.

It was ranked 609th by the QS World University Rankings in 2026. Trent has also received a five-star rating on the QS World University Rankings for universities within the 500-600 category.

=== Graduation ===
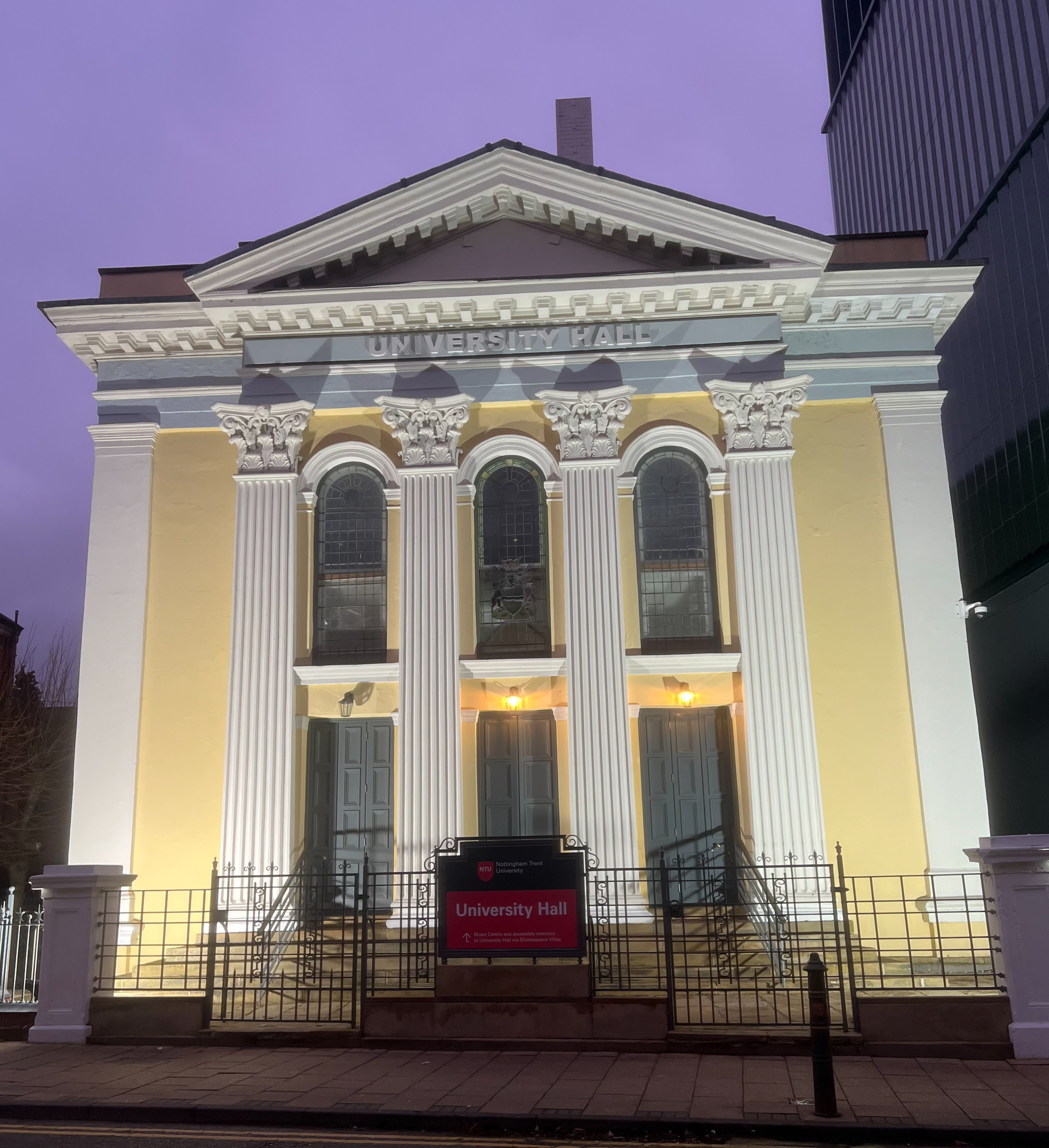
The Grade II listed University Hall, used for graduation ceremonies

Graduation ceremonies at Nottingham Trent University are typically held twice a year, in winter and summer. Ceremonies take place on the university’s City Campus at University Hall, a restored 19th-century building on Shakespeare Street which serves as a central venue for academic and cultural events.

University Hall was originally constructed in 1854 as a Wesleyan Chapel, with later extensions added in 1976. The building was acquired and restored by the university in the 2010s, and is now used for graduation ceremonies and other events.

In 2024, the university introduced a redesigned set of academic dress, following a competition involving students from the Nottingham School of Art & Design. The new gowns incorporate sustainable materials, including recycled plastics, and feature design elements inspired by the university’s architecture.

=== Research ===
Nottingham Trent University undertakes interdisciplinary research across a broad range of subject areas, with a particular emphasis on research impact, professional practice, and collaboration with industry, public bodies, and communities. The university’s research activity has expanded in recent years, with national league tables such as The Times pointing to a strengthening research profile alongside its broader institutional performance.

In the Research Excellence Framework (REF) 2021, the university made submissions across 14 Units of Assessment. NTU submitted 39 impact case studies, with 86 per cent of its research impact rated as world-leading (4★) or internationally excellent (3★). The submitted case studies demonstrated the contribution of NTU’s research to areas including the economy, society, culture, public policy, health, the environment, and quality of life beyond academia.

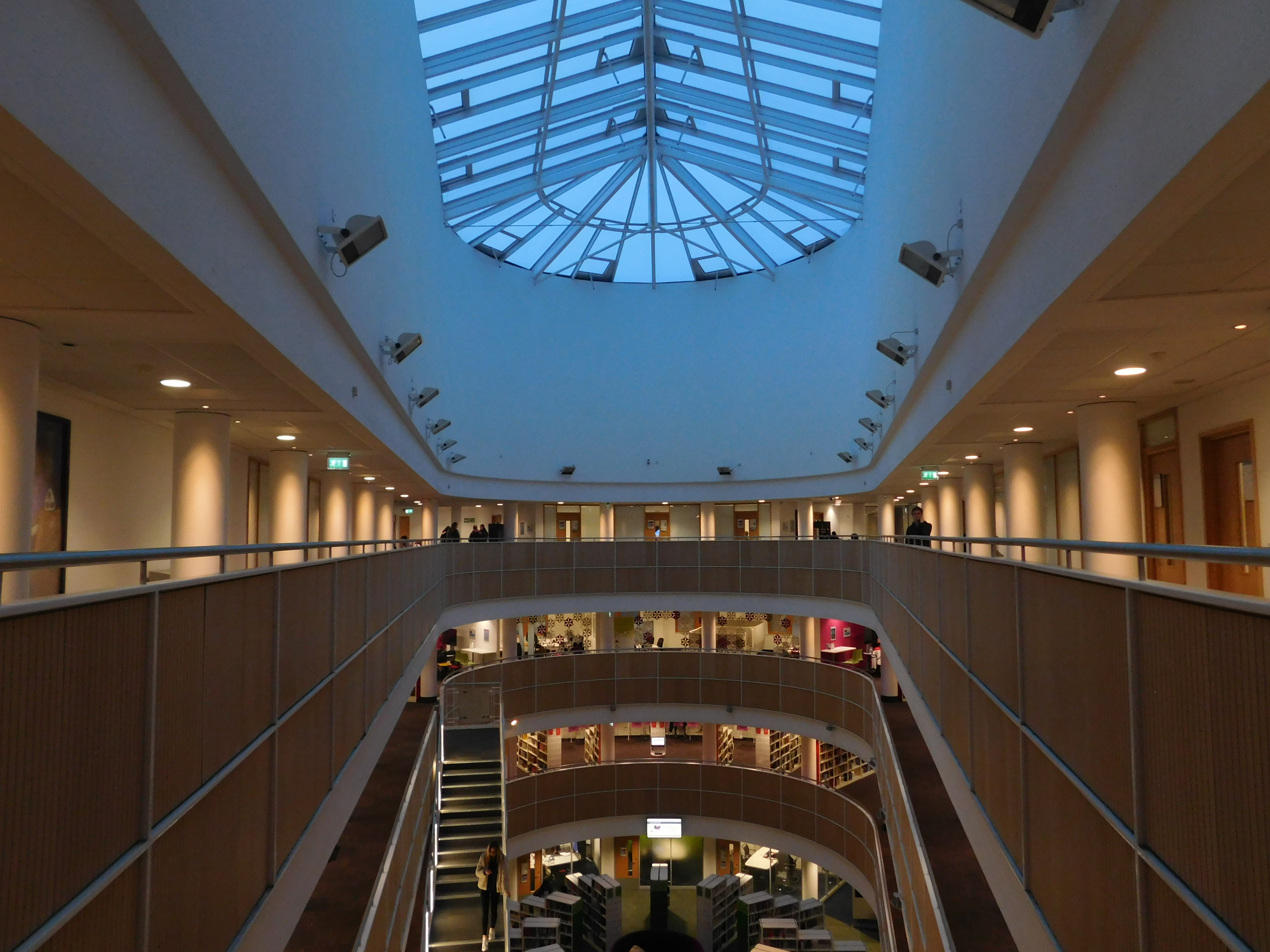
Boots Library

Examples of REF 2021 impact case studies include the commercialisation of artificial-intelligence-based algorithms to accelerate in-silico drug and diagnostic biomarker discovery, supporting faster and more cost-effective development of therapeutics, and the development and commercial application of high-energy X-ray diffraction imaging technologies through Halo X-Ray Technologies Ltd, aimed at improving next-generation security screening systems.

In November 2015, the university was awarded the Queen's Anniversary Prize for Higher and Further Education, "the highest national honour for a UK University" based on numerous research projects. In November 2021, the university again received the award, based on numerous research projects.

Research in road safety and psychology has also led to commercial applications. Esitu Solutions, a spin-out from Nottingham Trent University, developed a virtual reality training programme for young and learner drivers based on academic research conducted at the university. The system uses immersive 360-degree driving simulations to develop hazard-perception skills and was piloted as part of the Bedfordshire Road Safety Partnership's road safety programme, with support from Reed in Partnership. The underlying research was sponsored by the Road Safety Trust.

Research in artificial intelligence and computing includes work in TinyML, edge computing and decentralised artificial intelligence. In 2026, Nottingham Trent University became the lead institution for the EPSRC-funded TinyML UK Network, a national research network focused on developing low-power machine learning technologies capable of operating directly on small and resource-constrained devices. Led by NTU professor Eiman Kanjo, the network brings together researchers in artificial intelligence, electronics, hardware design and embedded systems, with the University of Southampton and Imperial College London as co-leads.

Research in agriculture and food production is centred in part at the university's Brackenhurst Campus. In 2026, NTU opened a Smart Agriculture Research Centre for research into controlled-environment agriculture, crop optimisation and sustainable food production. The facility incorporates hydroponic and aeroponic growing systems, controlled environmental chambers, advanced plant imaging and molecular analysis facilities, with artificial intelligence used to analyse environmental and crop-growth data. The $1.5 million facility was supported by capital funding from the Office for Students and is intended to support interdisciplinary research and commercial partnerships in the agri-tech sector.

Research in medical technologies includes work on potential treatments for neurodegenerative diseases. In 2024, researchers at NTU received more than £1 million from the Eranda Rothschild Foundation for a study investigating non-invasive and targeted approaches to treating Alzheimer's disease, dementia and Parkinson's disease. The research involves the use of focused ultrasound and specialised microbubbles to temporarily open the blood–brain barrier, potentially enabling targeted therapies to reach the brain, alongside the development of a three-dimensional laboratory model of the blood–brain barrier using human brain cells.

The university’s research activity is supported through a range of specialist research centres and institutes, and is closely aligned with its teaching provision and external engagement. The University hosts the Medical Technologies Innovation Facility (MTIF), a £23 million dual-site research facility supporting the development and translation of medical technologies from early-stage research through to clinical application, in collaboration with industry and NHS partners.

Cancer research at Nottingham Trent University is led in part by the John van Geest Cancer Research Centre, which conducts research into cancer diagnosis, prognosis and treatment, with a focus on cancer immunotherapy and personalised medicine. Established in 2008, the centre has received significant philanthropic support from the John and Lucille van Geest Foundation and collaborates with academic, clinical and commercial partners in the UK and internationally.

=== Fashion and textiles ===
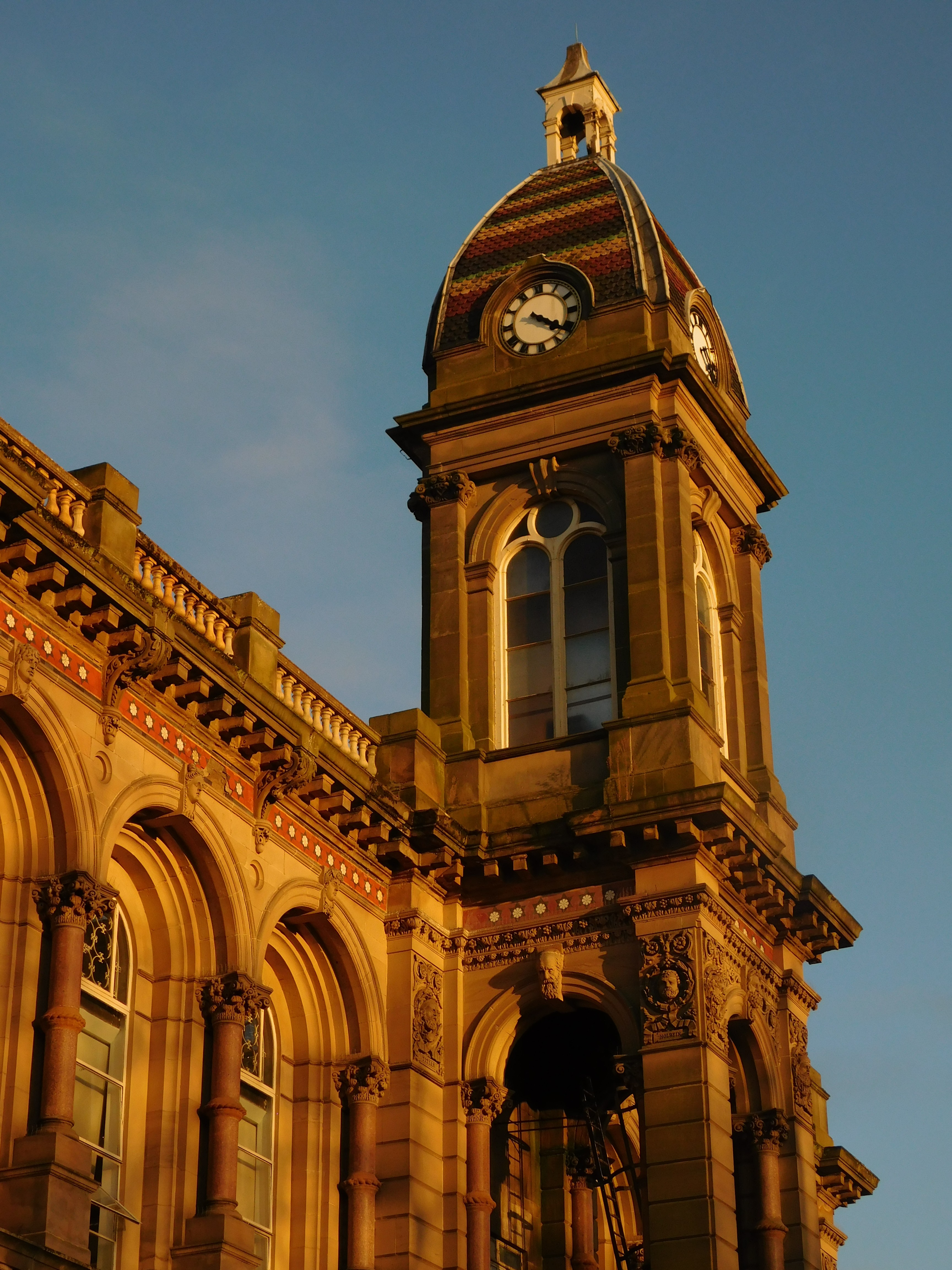
Nottingham School of Art on Waverley Street

From October 1995, the Fashion Information Service (FINS) was headquartered at NTU, which developed the Fashion Connect national industry database.

In 1998 the Computer Clothing Research Centre developed the Symcad system for finding better measurements of clothing, via 3D body scanning, led by Stephen Gray. In 1999 it carried out the first nationwide survey of women's bodies, since 1951, and a study of men's bodies in 2000. The findings of the survey were readily sold to M&S and Debenhams, for a redefinition of clothes fittings for women. To conduct this large survey required a considerable number of people to completely strip off. At Nottingham Court in January 2002, 47-year-old Stephen Gray appeared. The prosecution said that the university project was to 'gratify his perversion' and that 'he had what can only be described as a penis fixation'. Computer Clothing Research had become a spin-off company in 2000. Gray, admitted ten charges of indecent assault in November 2000, and received nine months in prison in March 2002. Forensic psychologist Belinda Winder later set up the university's Sexual Offences, Crime and Misconduct Research Unit in 2007.

=== Business and industry links ===
The university maintains close ties to over 6,000 businesses and 94% of students progress to full-time employment or further education within six months of graduating. These companies include Microsoft, Toyota, Boots, Experian and Rolls-Royce.

Across NTU, there are a number of dedicated centres that provide a focus for expertise and business resources.

Since 2001, the university has helped 250 start up companies of which 70% have been successful. In 2008, The Guardian said Nottingham Trent University was one of the top places in the country for graduate employment. Research commercialisation and university spin-outs form part of NTU's engagement with industry. HALO X-ray Technologies, a spin-out of Nottingham Trent University and Cranfield University, was established to commercialise high-energy X-ray diffraction technology developed through collaborative university research. In 2026, the company secured a multimillion-dollar investment round led by Agilent Technologies, with participation from the UK Innovation & Science Seed Fund and the Midlands Engine Investment Fund, to support regulatory approval and commercial scale-up of its technology.

Other spin-outs include Intelligent OMICS, formerly known as CompanDX, which originated from research at NTU into the application of artificial intelligence and machine learning to healthcare and personalised medicine. The company's research team, led by NTU professor Graham Ball, developed computational approaches for analysing large biological datasets.

In July 2026, the East Midlands Freeport established its permanent headquarters at the university's Medical Technologies Innovation Facility (MTIF) R&D Hub at Clifton Campus. The co-location places the Freeport alongside university researchers, spin-out companies and other businesses based at MTIF, with the partnership focused on innovation, technology commercialisation, inward investment and regional economic development across the East Midlands.

In 2019, the university began offering qualifications in Artisan Food Production, in affiliation with The School of Artisan Food on the nearby Welbeck Estate.

The university also undertakes international work in entrepreneurship and research commercialisation through Nottingham Business School's Centre for Business and Industry Transformation (CBIT). In 2026, NTU formalised a partnership with Thailand's Ministry of Higher Education, Science, Research and Innovation and renewed an agreement with Chiang Mai University. The collaboration covers entrepreneurship education, artificial intelligence, research commercialisation and workforce development. Initiatives developed through the partnership include an experiential learning programme for Thai students, a train-the-trainer programme for research commercialisation, and an AI skills training centre in northern Thailand.

== Environmental profile ==
=== Sustainability ===
The university was named "the most environmentally friendly university in the country" by The Guardian, and in 2009 it was awarded the title of "the most environmentally friendly university in the UK", by The People & Planet Green League (the only independent ranking of British universities' environmental and ethical performance – published by the Times Higher Education); with 100% of the university's electricity generated by renewable sources since 2009.

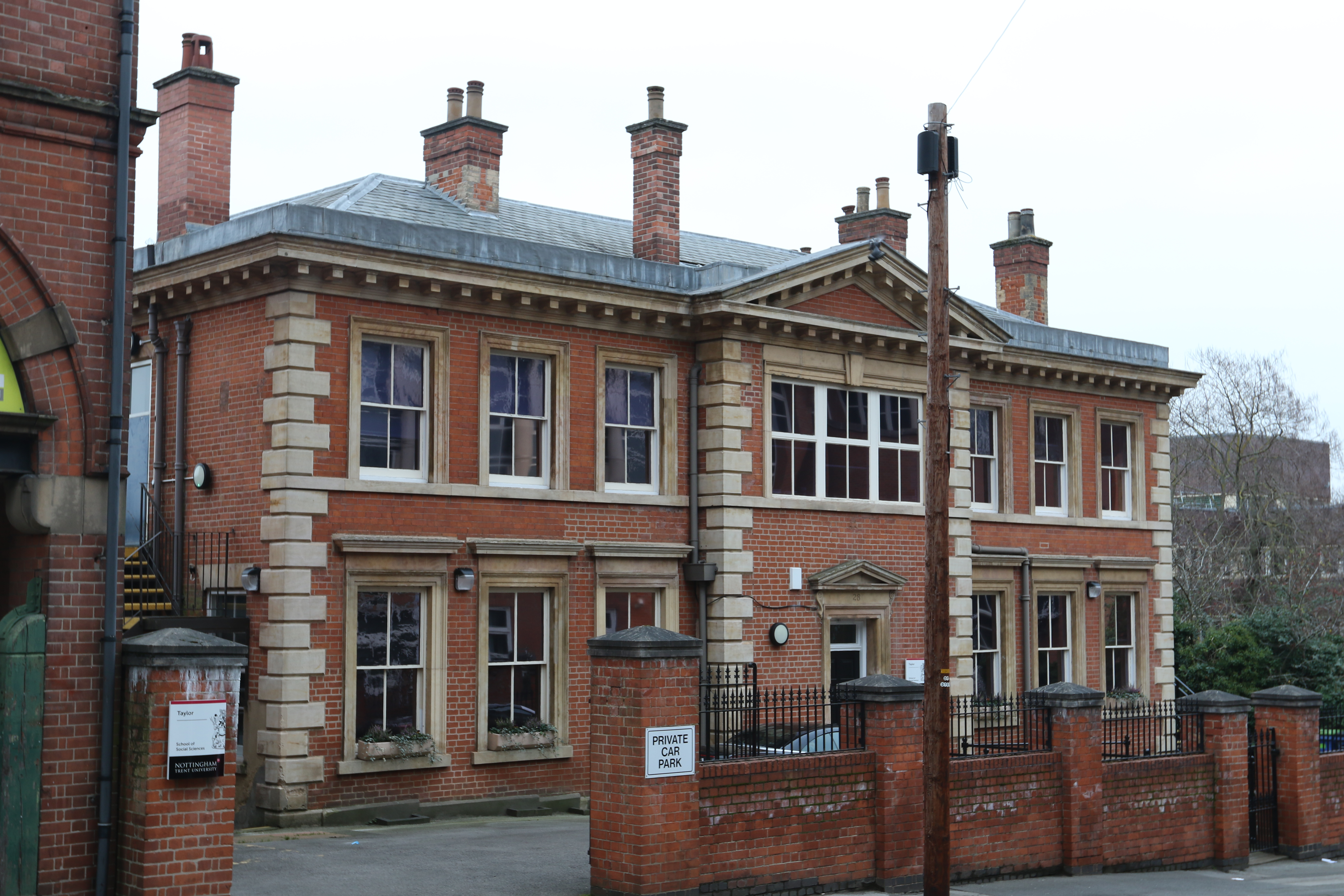
Taylor Building

Between 2009 and 2012, NTU received four First Class Awards from Green League, reflecting its commitment to carbon reduction and its efforts to become an environmentally aware higher education institution.

Aside from organising various 'green' activity clusters (e.g., The Carbon Elephant, The Wind Turbines Project, The UCycle Scheme), the university has also been formally awarded Fairtrade status. Fairtrade products are therefore available in all campus shops, catering outlets and the Students' Union. Also, Nottingham Trent University branded T-shirts and hoodies sold in the Student Union shops are made from Fairtrade cotton. Additionally, the university holds a yearly Fairtrade Fortnight Celebration, featuring a range of events and activities to raise awareness of the work of the Fairtrade Foundation and NTU's commitment to ensuring that farmers in some of the poorest areas of the world receive a fair price for their produce.

The university published a Sustainable Purchasing Policy in 2007, which was said to outline specific aims meant to embed sustainability into the institution's purchasing activities. NTU also acknowledged its responsibility to operate in an ethical manner and claims to take into account social, environmental and ethical considerations in all of its activities, including financial investment. The university's Treasury Management Policy included a separate section on Ethical Investment, which states that "investments shall only be made with institutions with a clear and transparent Ethical Investment Policy which reflect the university's ethical values".

Nottingham Trent University is a member of the International Universities Climate Alliance (IUCA), an international network of universities collaborating on climate research, education and evidence-based approaches to climate change.

=== Campus biodiversity ===
Nottingham Trent University manages approximately 250 hectares of land across its City, Clifton and Brackenhurst campuses, encompassing urban, parkland and rural environments. The university undertakes biodiversity conservation initiatives across its estate, including habitat management, wildlife monitoring and sustainability planning, with Brackenhurst Campus forming the largest rural component of its landholding.

== Student life ==
=== Students' Union ===
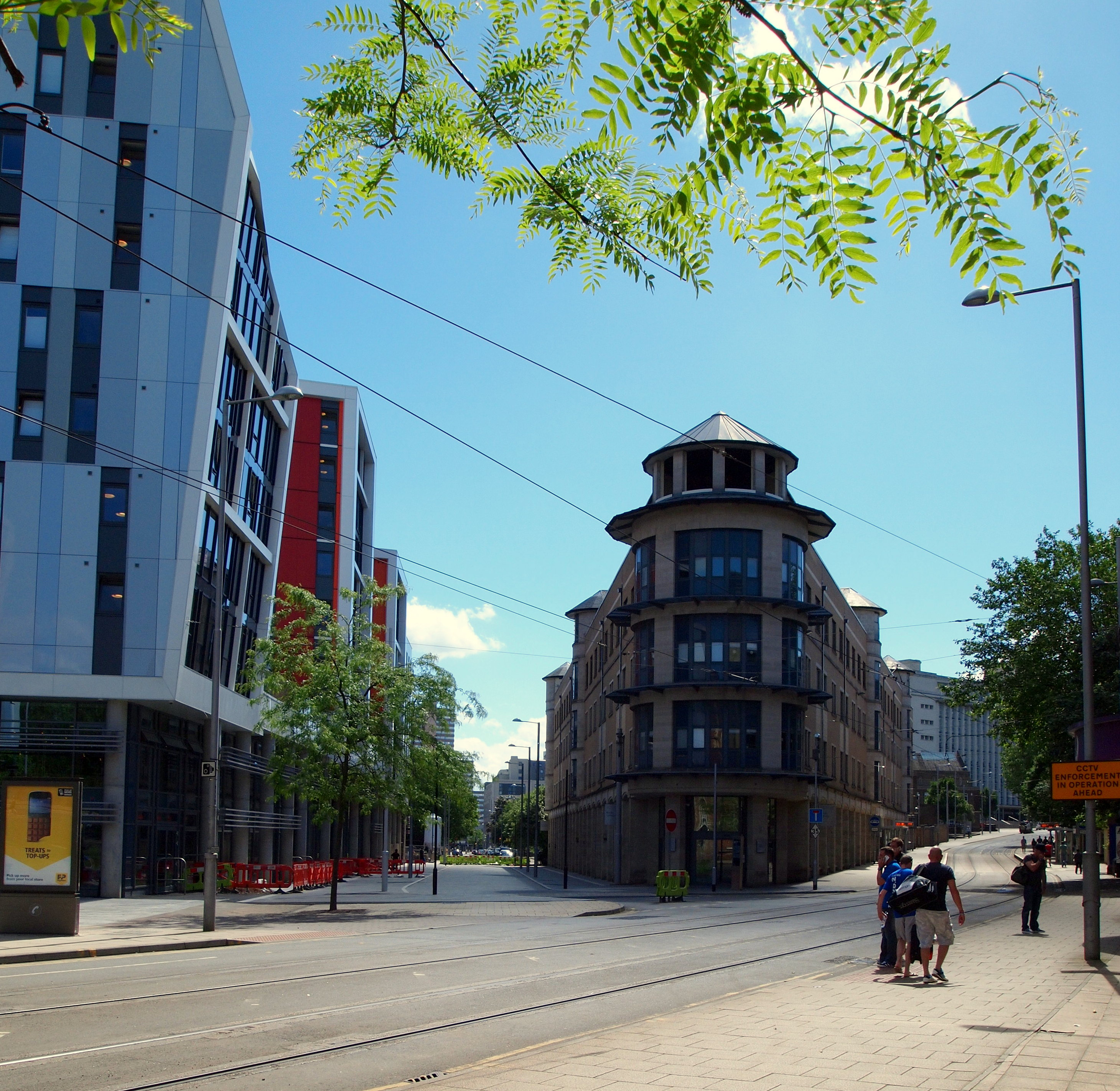
Students' Union (left) and Boots Library (right)

Nottingham Trent Students' Union (NTSU) represents students across all Nottingham Trent University campuses and provides student activities and events, a Student Advice Centre, leisure and retail services, democratic representation and night-time entertainment.

RAG is NTSU's fundraising department, where volunteers organise events to raise money for local, national and international charities selected by the student membership.

A student magazine, Platform, is published online throughout the academic year and is also available in print on campus. It covers education, local and on-campus news, as well as arts, culture, sport and lifestyle, and has previously hosted the Student Publication Association’s annual conference.

Trent TV is the students' union television station, broadcasting online programmes including coverage of Freshers’ Week, the annual NTSU Awards, student life in Nottingham and Trent TV News. The station was awarded ‘Best News Programme of 2011’ by the National Student Television Association.

Fly Live is the students’ union radio station, broadcasting daytime, specialist, entertainment, sport and news programming. Founded in 1996 by then students’ union president Ben Morrison, the station has since won multiple Student Radio Association awards.

In addition to its social and representative functions, NTSU provides welfare and academic support through its free and independent Information and Advice Service, offering guidance on issues including housing, finance, wellbeing and academic concerns. The union also supports student engagement through more than 100 student-led societies, volunteering opportunities, and elected academic and executive representatives across all campuses.

In late 2014, some Nottingham Trent University students affiliated with the UK Independence Party (UKIP) attempted to form an official student society. The union’s Societies Assembly initially voted to block the group, prompting criticism from UKIP representatives and coverage in national media, including Sky News. In January 2015, the union acknowledged that the original decision had been influenced by personal political views and subsequently overturned the ban, allowing the society to be established.

=== Student residences ===
Nottingham Trent University provides a wide range of student accommodation across its campuses in Nottingham, including the City Campus, Clifton Campus, Brackenhurst Campus and NTU Mansfield. Accommodation is available both on campus and in nearby areas, with transport links connecting different sites.

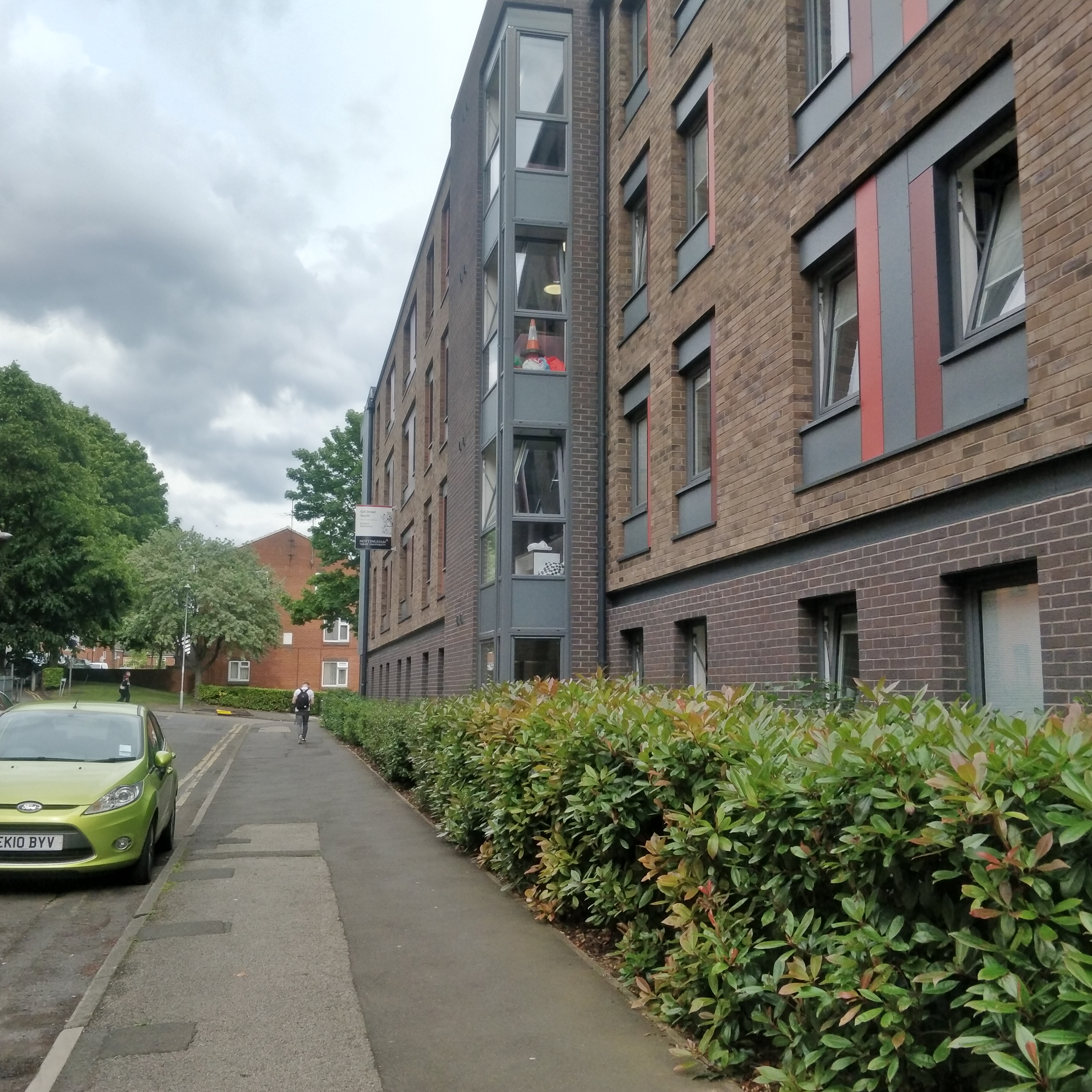
A hall of residence on the City Campus

The university guarantees accommodation in Nottingham for first-year undergraduate and postgraduate students, subject to eligibility criteria and application deadlines. NTU accommodation is divided into three main categories: university-managed halls, halls operated in partnership with private provider UPP, and privately managed accommodation approved by the university.

The university offers over 15,000 student beds within walking distance of its campuses, with a range of room types including en-suite rooms, shared facilities, studios and apartments designed to suit different budgets and preferences. Accommodation is available for undergraduate, postgraduate and returning students, as well as short-term and single-semester stays.

Halls of residence are located both on and off campus, particularly around the City Campus, where several halls are within walking distance of teaching facilities and Nottingham city centre. Additional accommodation is provided at Clifton and Brackenhurst campuses, while students at NTU Mansfield may live in university accommodation or private housing nearby.

Student accommodation is supported by a dedicated team of Student Accommodation Support Officers (SASOs), who provide assistance with wellbeing, settling into halls, and resolving disputes. The university also offers an Accommodation Hub service to provide guidance on housing options and bookings.

=== Sport ===
NTU sports scholars have competed in the summer and winter Olympic Games, the Commonwealth Games and world championships. NTU alumni include England Rugby player Nick Easter and GB Hockey players Crista Cullen and Alastair Wilson.

In July 1989 it hosted the international Cerebral Palsy Games, funded by the city and county councils, and the Spastics Society.

The 2010 world number one golfer and honorary graduate Lee Westwood opened the new Lee Westwood Sports Centre on the university's Clifton campus. The centre has sport and athlete support facilities, including sports halls, studios and fitness suites, and a nutrition training centre.

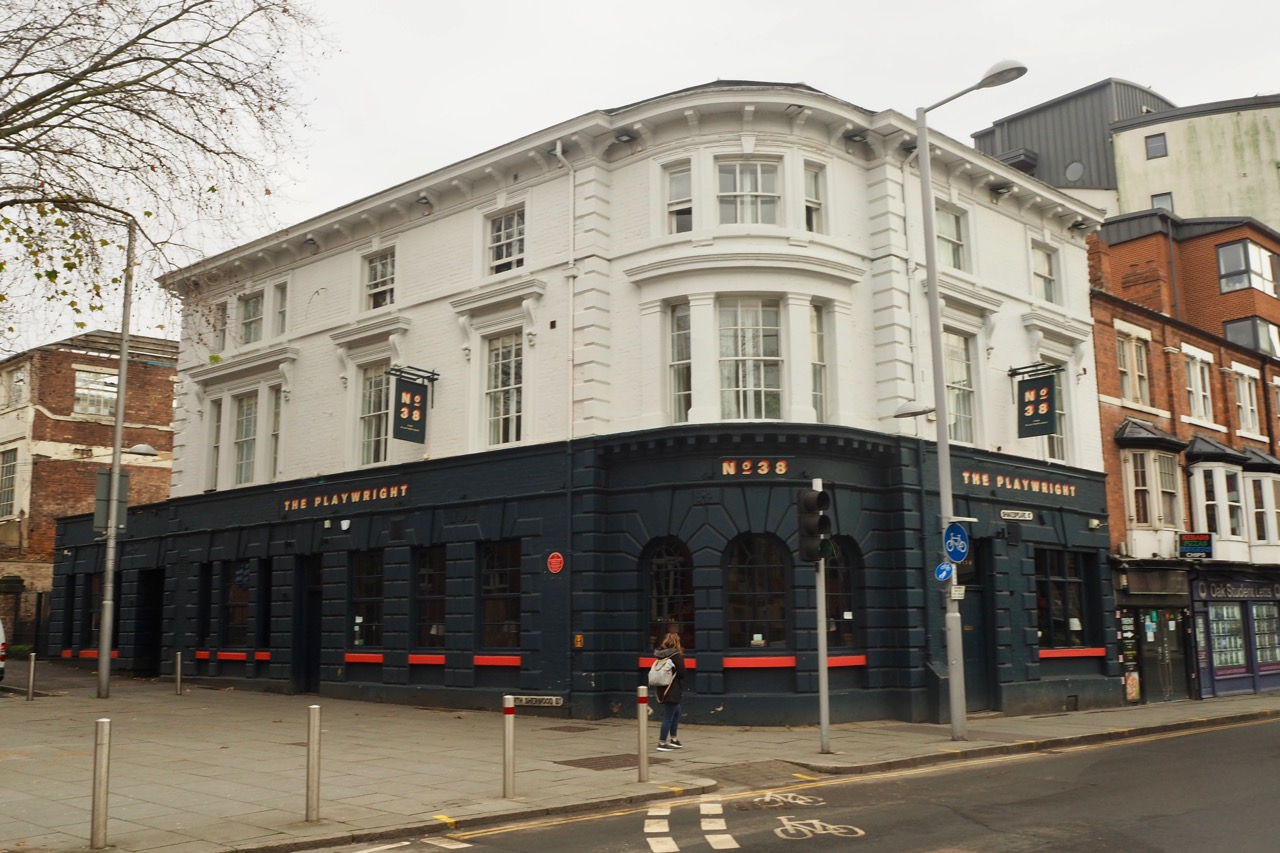
The Playwright pub, located next to Nottingham Trent University’s Design and Digital Arts Building

NTU is consistently ranked in the top 20% of institutions in the British Universities & Colleges Sport (BUCS) championships, and in the 2024/2025 season the university achieved a top 10 finish. NTU was recognised as the Sports University of the Year by the Daily Mail in 2025 with the university's focus on engaging a large number of students in sport and exercise at all levels being noted. The university competes in the Varsity Series against local rival, the University of Nottingham.

In the 1977 World Student Games in Sofia in Bulgaria, Ruth Kennedy represented the UK in athletics, and came fifth in the 400 metres.

In 1984 Simon Hodgkinson played for the England Students rugby team, touring South Africa, and captained the team. The rugby team was successful in British Polytechnic Sports Association (BPSA) competitions, and the University and College Amateur Rugby League Association (UCARLA). Harvey Thorneycroft played rugby for England Students in 1989.

Nottingham Trent University Rowing Club is affiliated to British Rowing (boat code NTU) and Trent Polytechnic's Rachel Hirst won the women's single sculls title at the 1986 British Rowing Championships.

== Notable people ==
=== Notable alumni ===
Nottingham Trent University and its predecessor institutions have educated graduates who have gone on to achieve prominence across public life, the arts, media, business, sport, and academia, both in the United Kingdom and internationally. Alumni include politicians, artists, filmmakers, business leaders, broadcasters, and athletes, reflecting the university’s historical strengths in creative, professional, and applied disciplines.

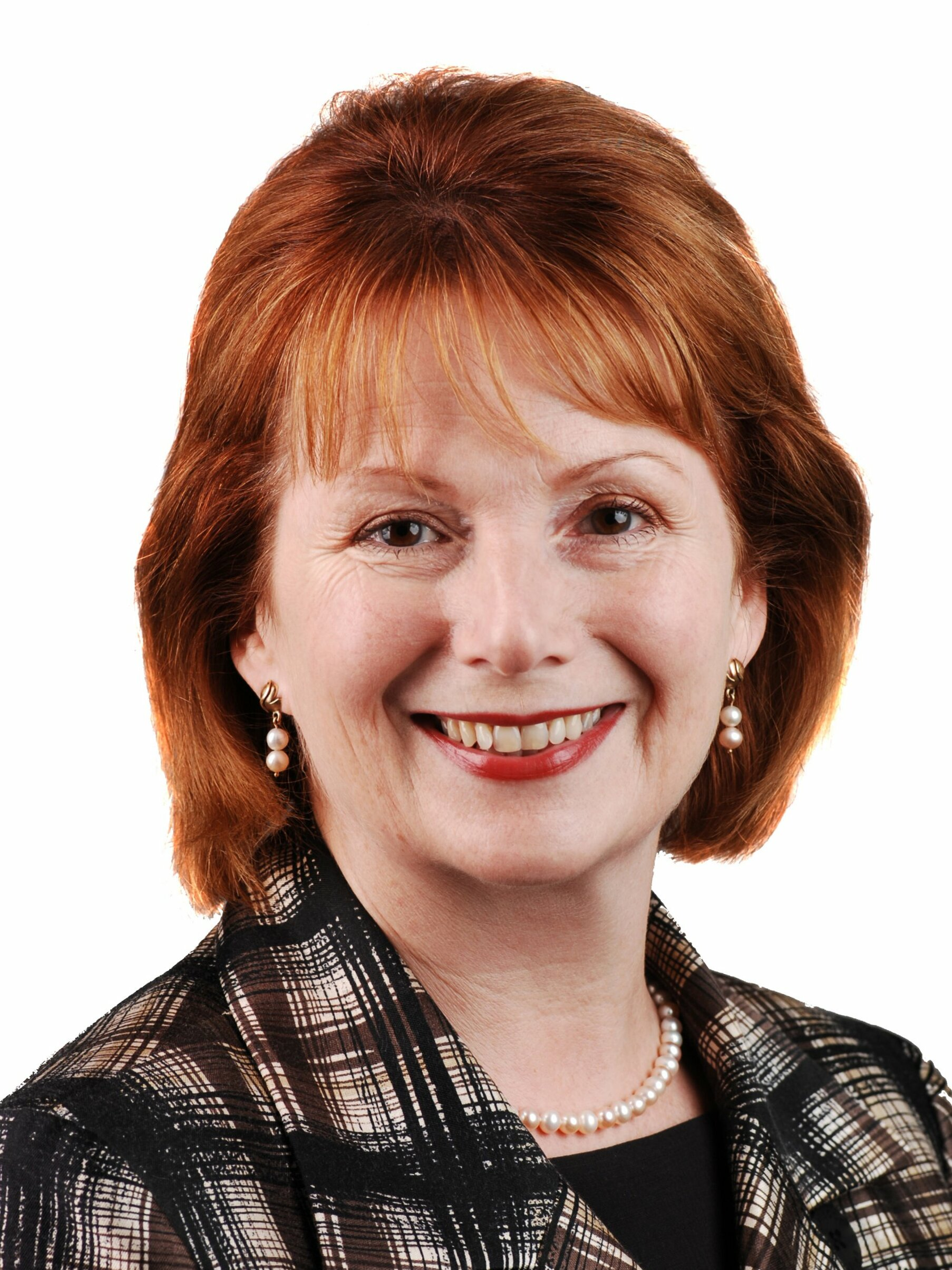
Hazel Blears – British Labour Party politician and former Cabinet Minister

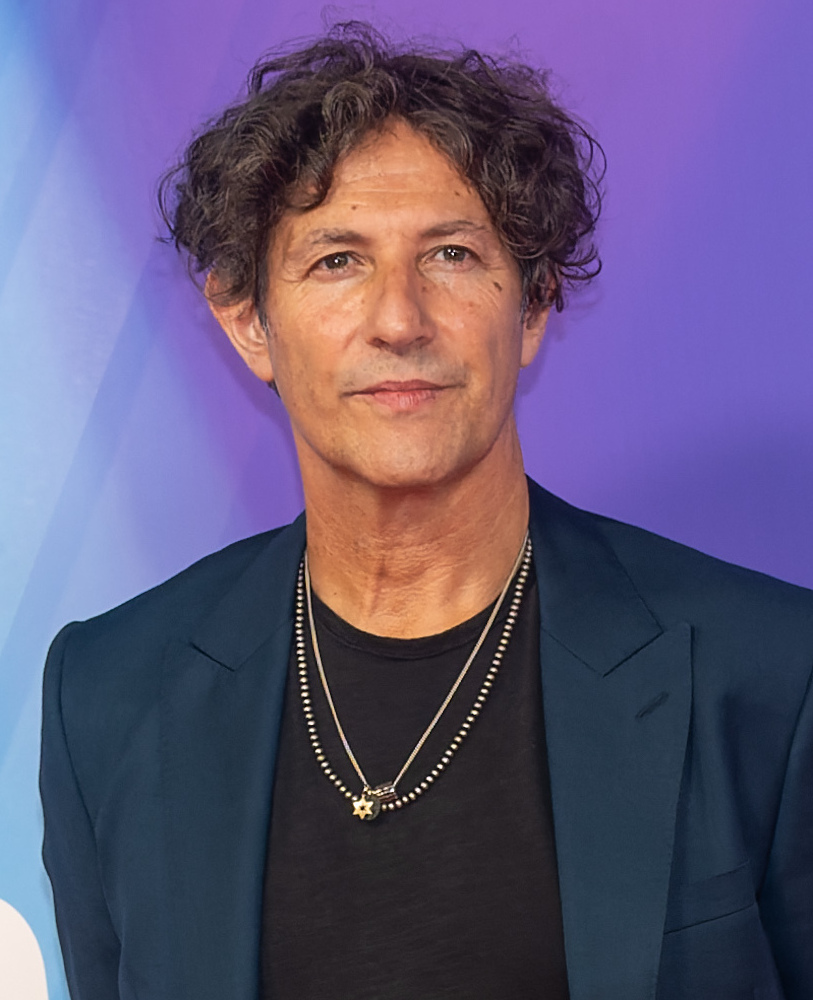
Jonathan Glazer – Film director and screenwriter

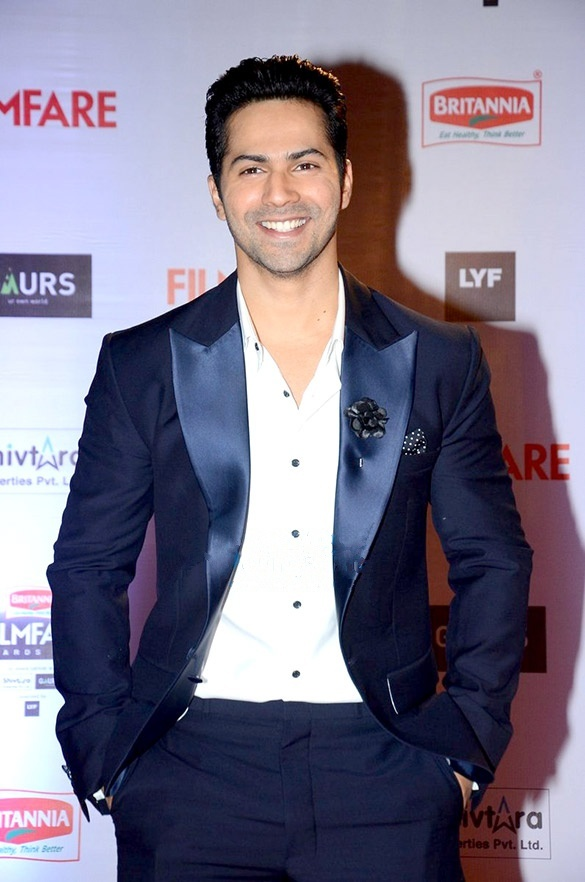
Varun Dhawan – Indian film actor

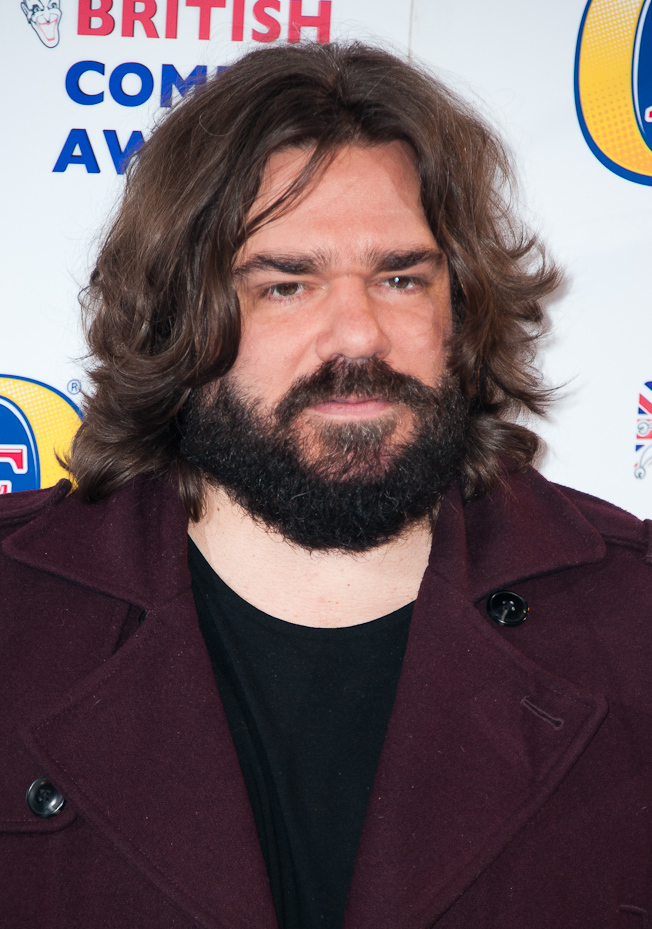
Matt Berry – Actor, writer and comedian

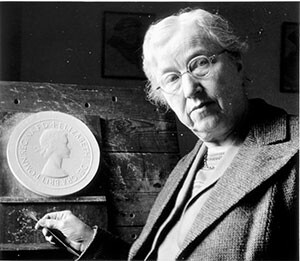
British sculptor Mary Gillick

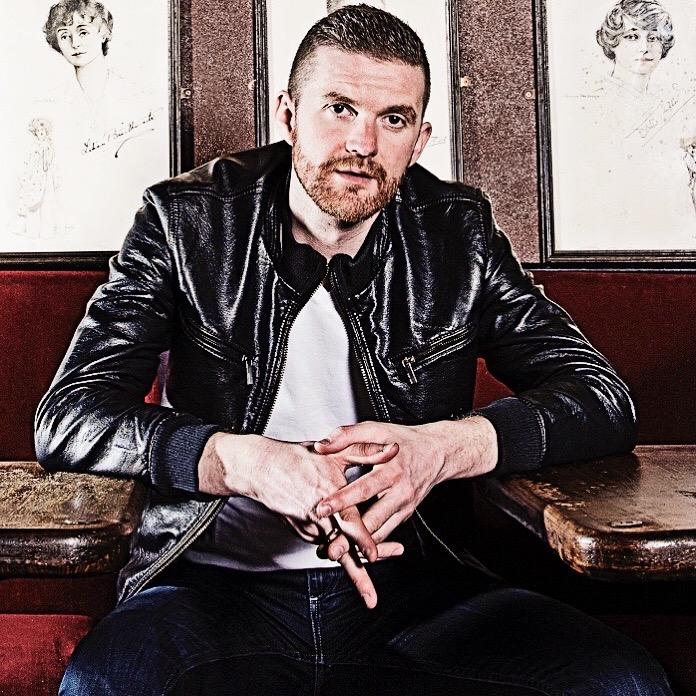
Shane Cullinan – Composer

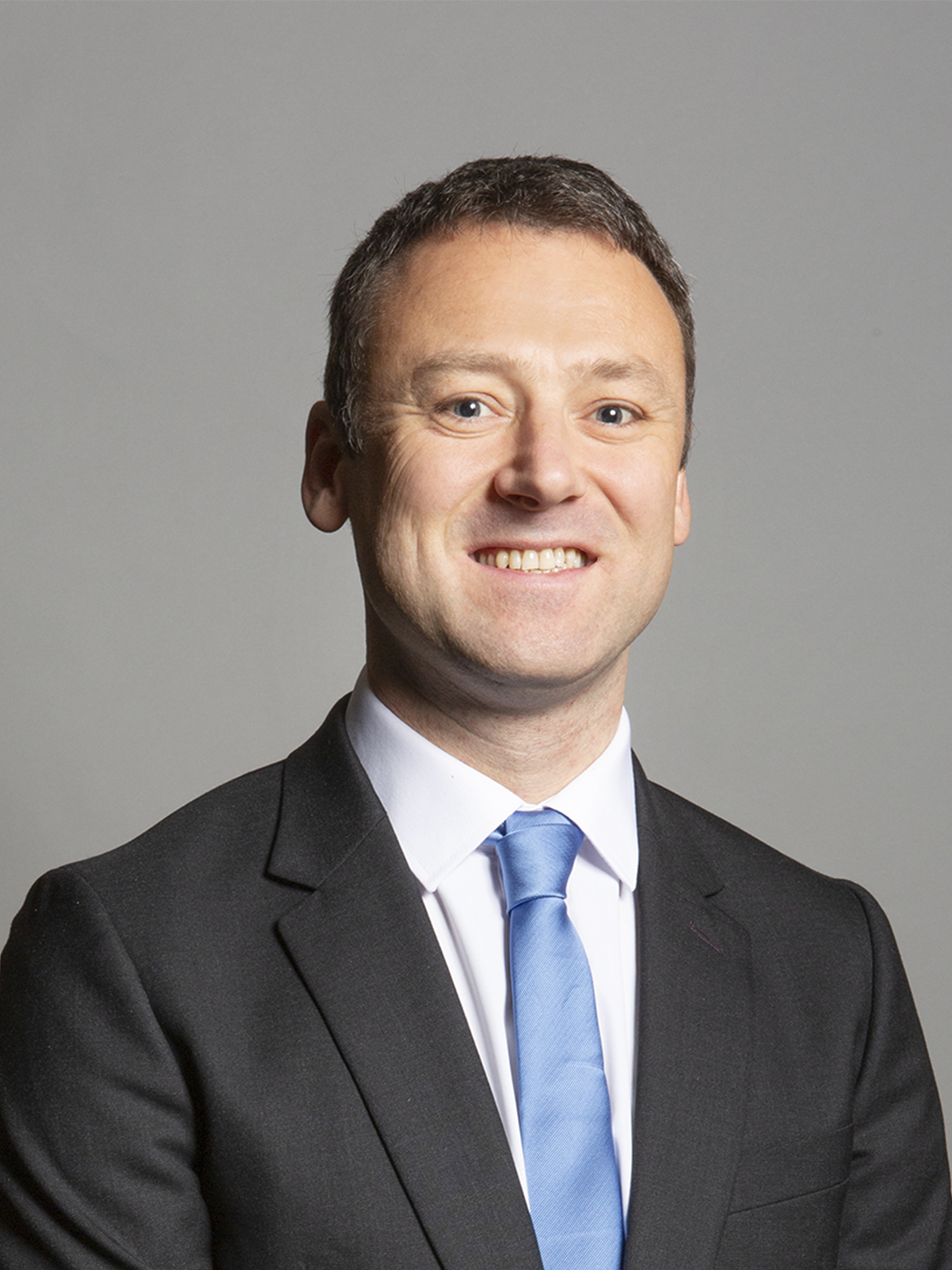
Conservative Party politician Brendan Clarke-Smith

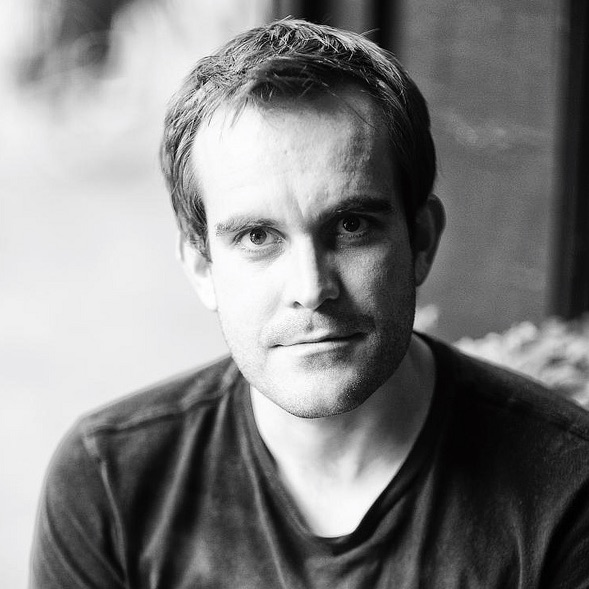
Writer, journalist and commentator Paul Bradley Carr

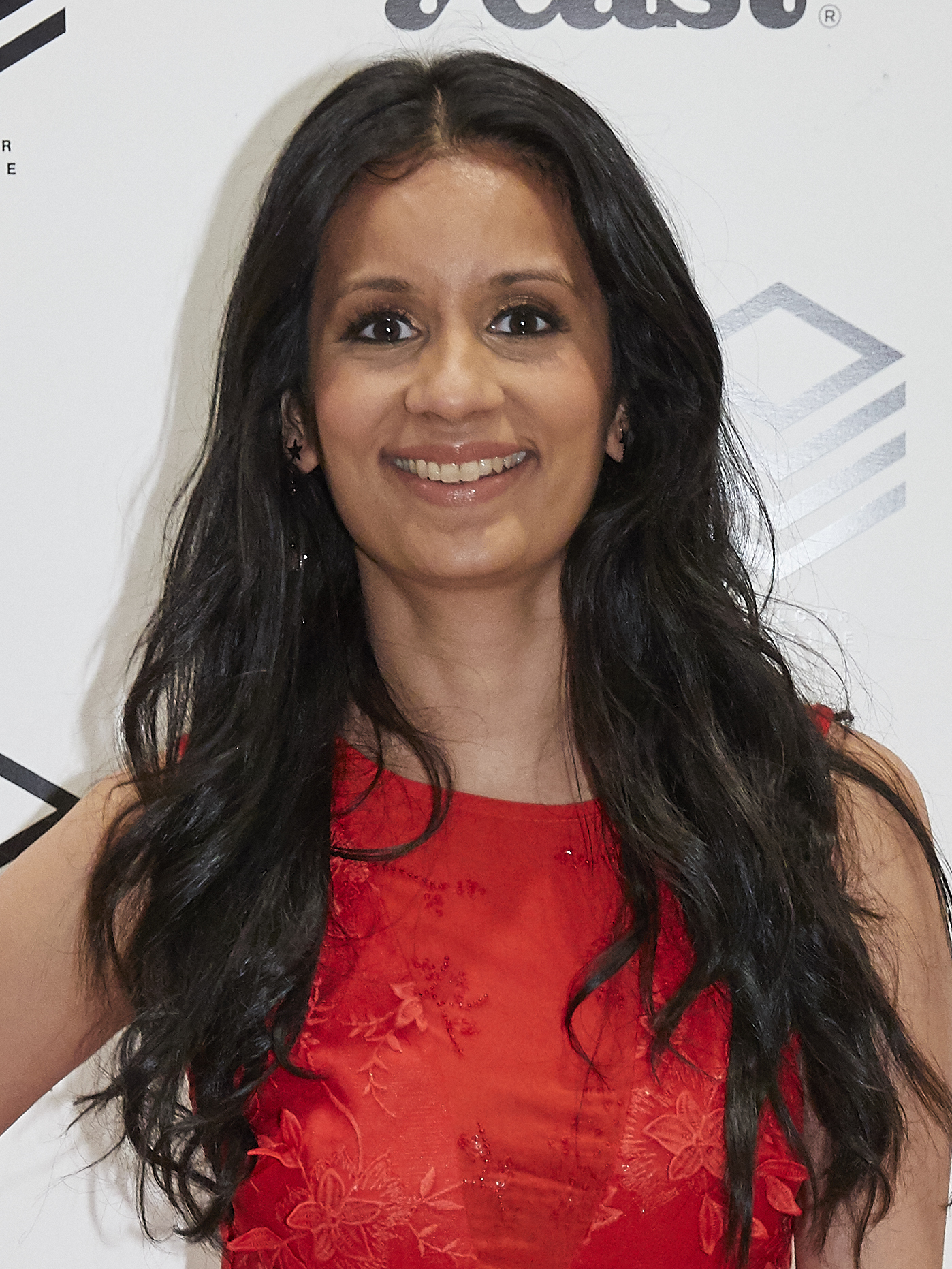
Broadcaster Sonali Shah

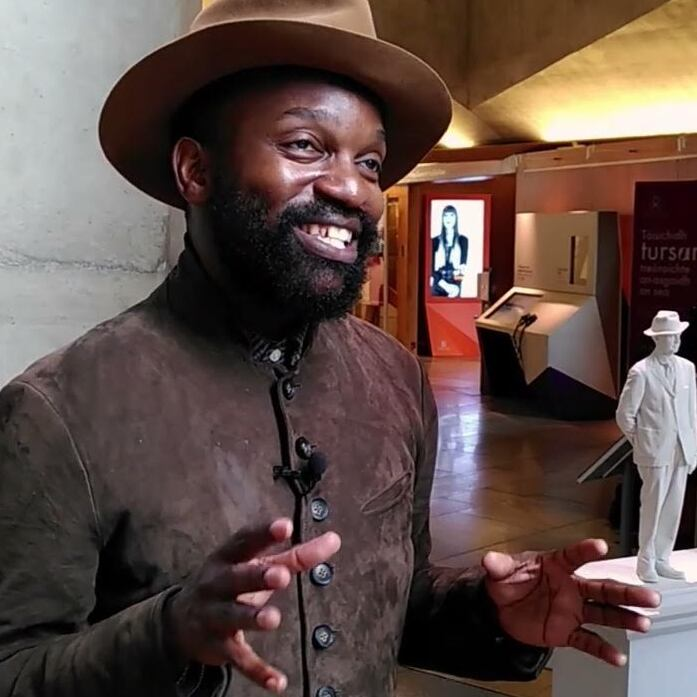
Artist and academic Samson Kambalu

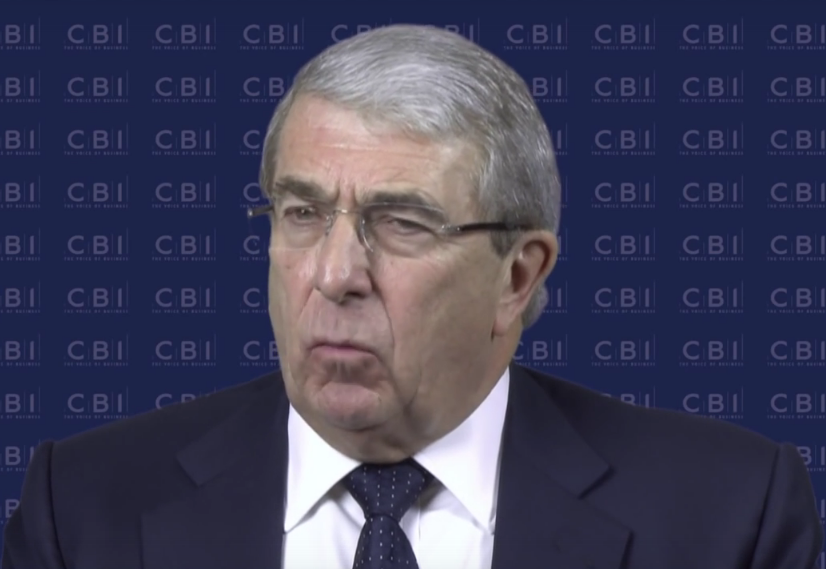
Businessman Sir Roger Carr

=== Notable academics and staff ===
Notable academics and staff of Nottingham Trent University and its predecessor institutions have included economist Cillian Ryan, earth scientist and vice-chancellor David Petley, poet and literary critic Gregory Woods, art historian and critic William Feaver, sociologist Jane Pilcher, legal scholar J. Martin Hunter, computer scientist Eiman Kanjo, historian and author Anthony Everitt, costume designer and historian Jenny Tiramani, cultural historian Patrick Wright, and sociologist Robert Dingwall.

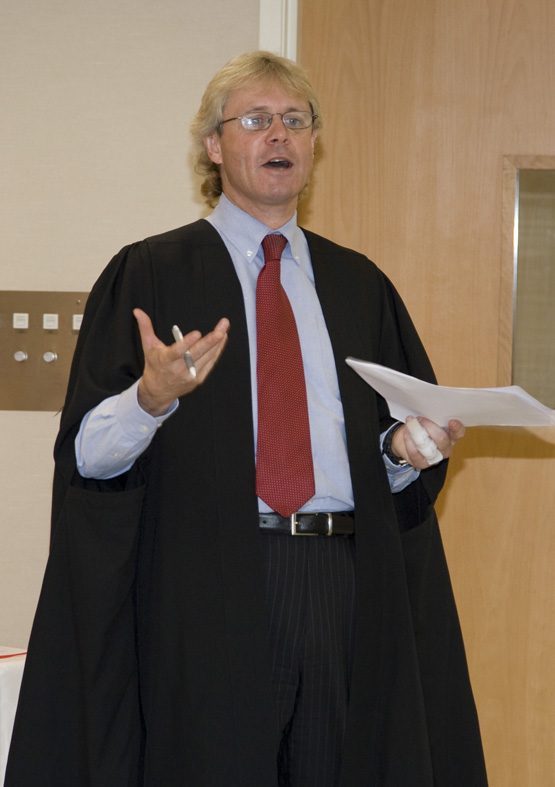
Nigel Healey

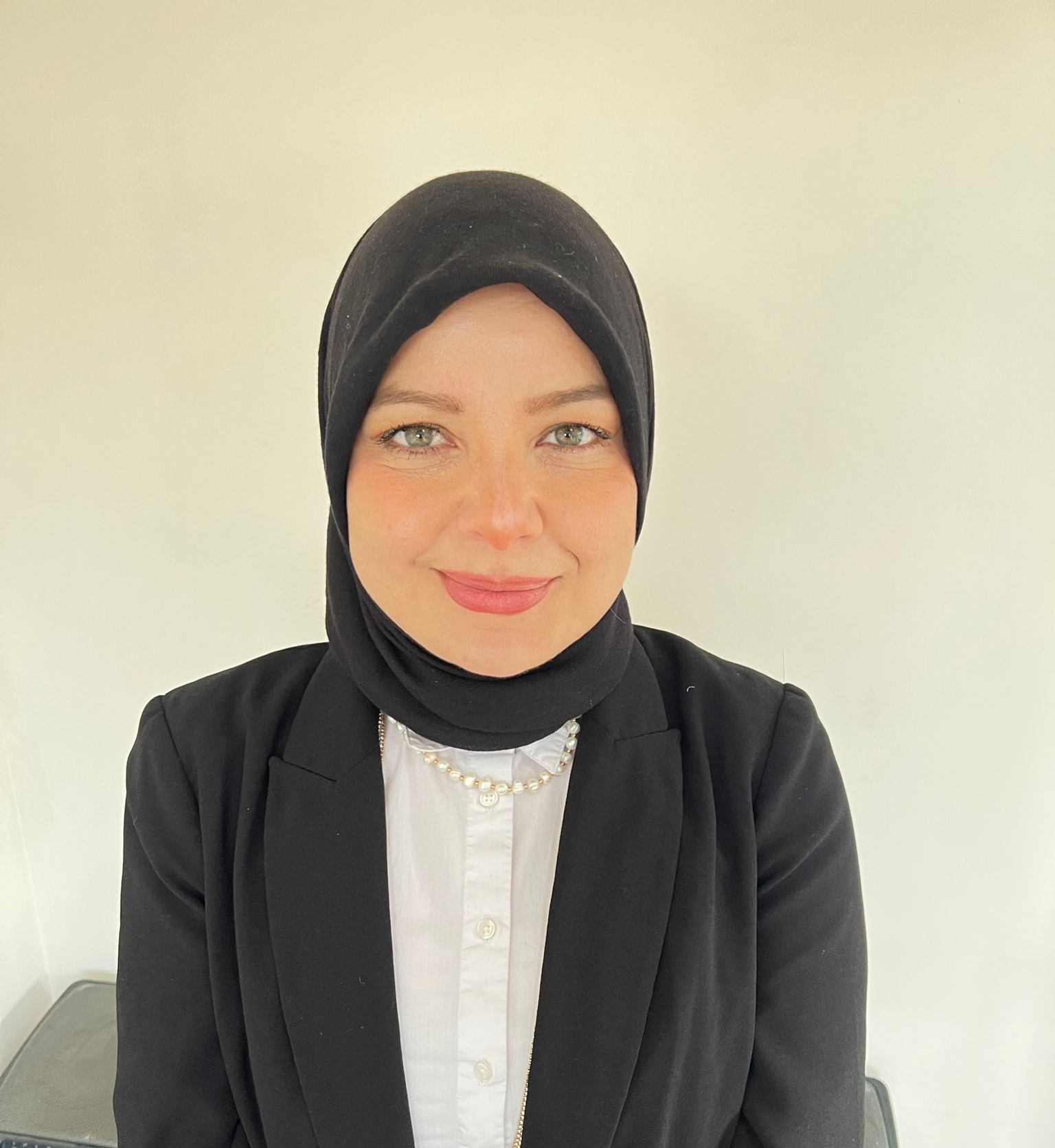
Eiman Kanjo

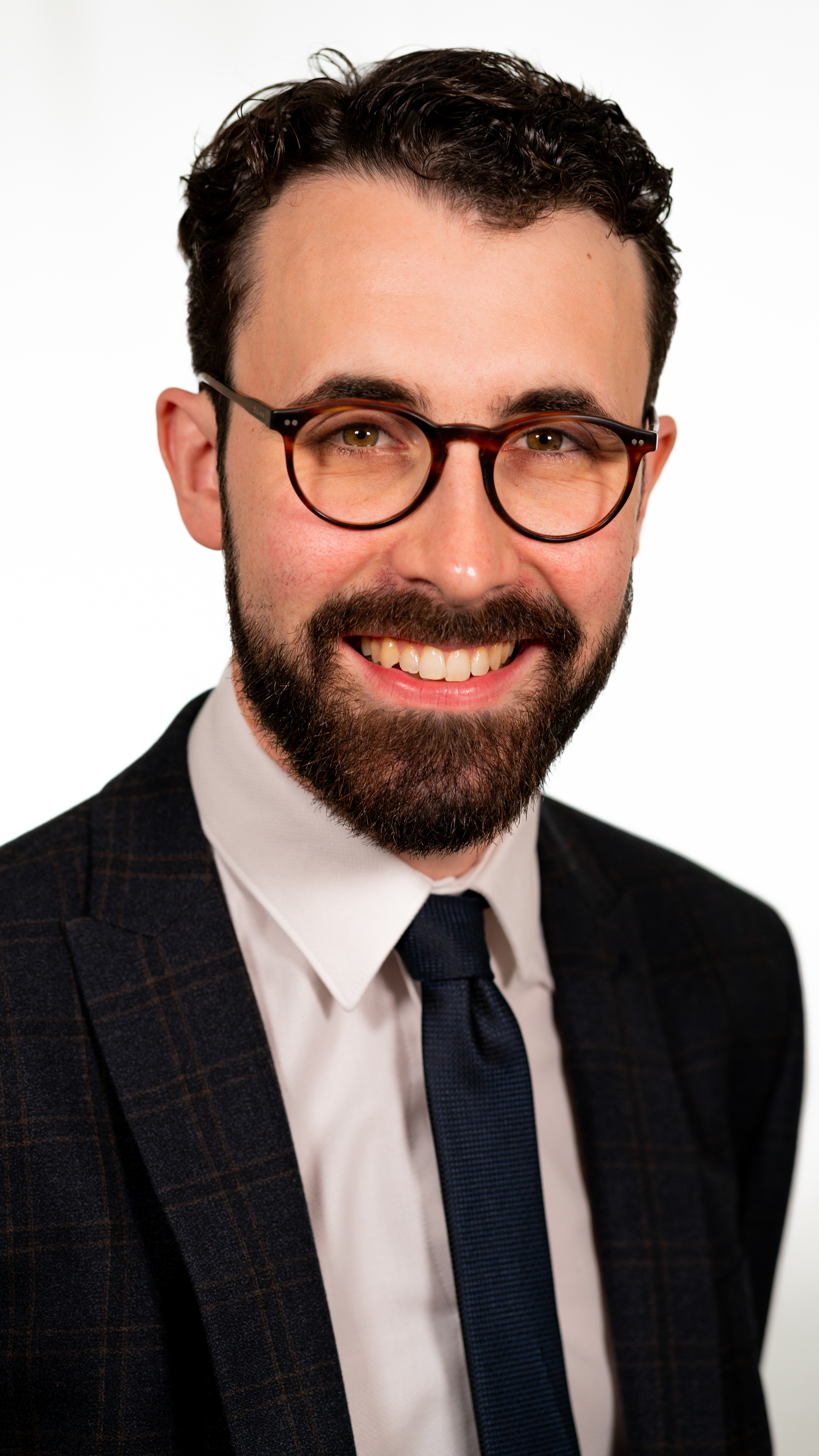
Philippe B. Wilson

== See also ==
- BioCity Nottingham
- Listed buildings in Nottingham (Hyson Green and Arboretum ward)
- Post-1992 universities
- Armorial of UK universities
- List of UK universities
- Nottingham Conference Centre
