= Nottingham Civic Exchange =

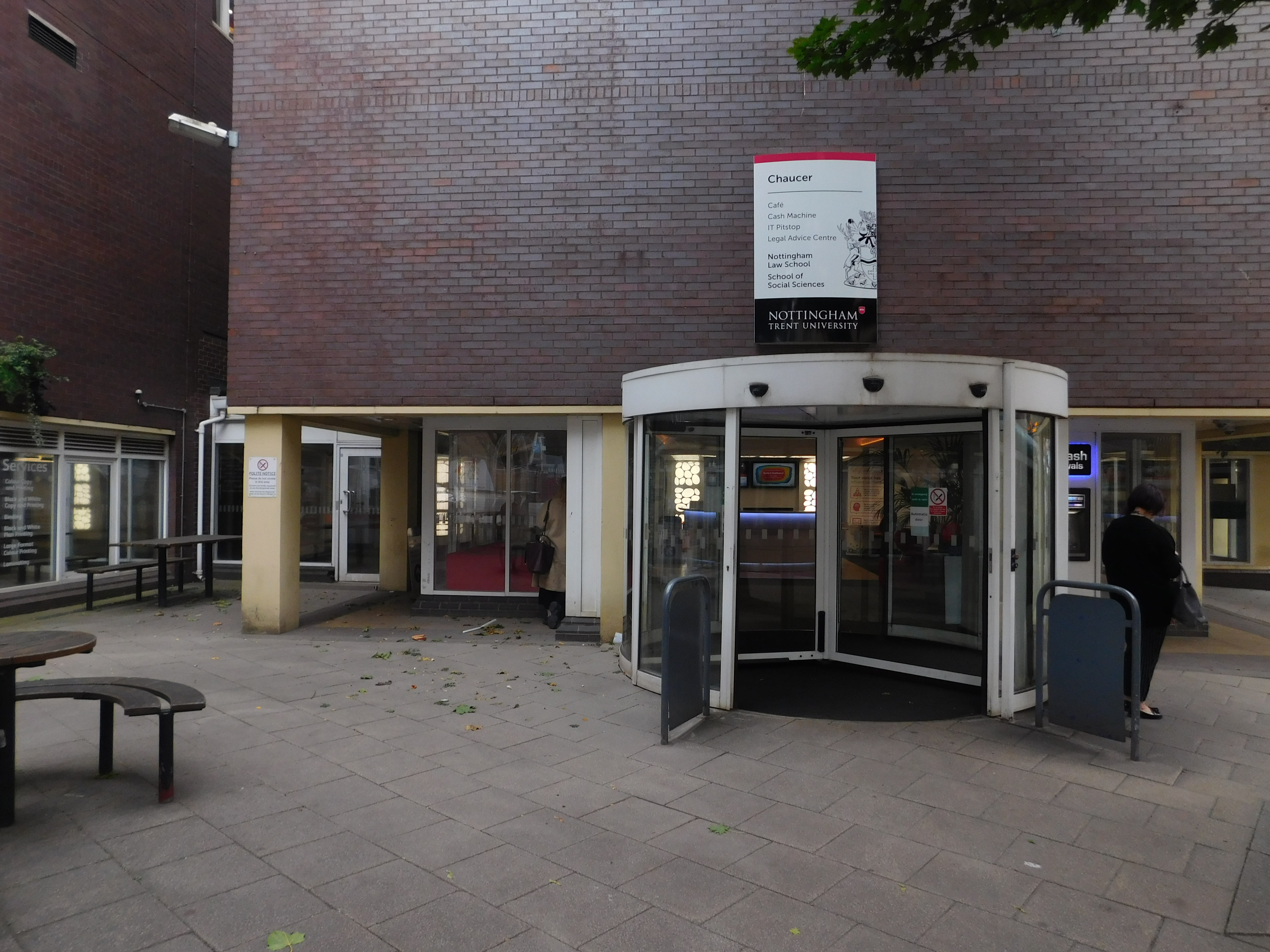
- Abbreviation: NCE
- Formation: 2017
- Type: University think tank
- Purpose: Research, policy engagement, civic impact
- Headquarters: Nottingham, England
- Parent organisation: Nottingham Trent University

Nottingham Civic Exchange (NCE) is a university-based think tank established by Nottingham Trent University to maximise research, policy, and practical impact through collaboration between academic researchers and external partners. Founded in 2017, the organisation focuses on social, economic, and civic issues, with an emphasis on place-based research and engagement at local, city, and regional levels.

Nottingham Civic Exchange operates as a platform for connecting university expertise with public bodies, community organisations, and other stakeholders. Its work aims to support evidence-informed decision-making, foster public debate, and develop applied projects addressing challenges affecting communities and organisations.

== Background ==
Nottingham Civic Exchange was established as part of Nottingham Trent University’s civic and public engagement strategy, reflecting a wider trend within UK higher education toward place-based research and policy collaboration. The think tank was created to provide a structured mechanism through which academic research could contribute more directly to public policy debates and practical interventions.

Since its launch, Nottingham Civic Exchange has positioned itself as a resource for applied research, partnership working, and public engagement. Its activities emphasise collaborative approaches to knowledge production and the translation of academic insight into practical outcomes.

== Organisation and role ==
Nottingham Civic Exchange is based within NTU’s School of Social Sciences and works closely with academic departments and research groups across the university. It acts as a point of connection between researchers and external partners, supporting academics in engaging with policy and practice contexts while enabling partners to access relevant university expertise.

The organisation’s role includes facilitating dialogue between researchers and policy-makers, supporting collaborative research design, and disseminating findings through reports, events, and public discussion. Through these activities, Nottingham Civic Exchange seeks to bridge the gap between academic research and policy development.

== Activities and thematic areas ==
The work of Nottingham Civic Exchange is organised around a number of thematic areas that bring together individual projects and longer-term programmes of activity. These themes reflect both the research strengths of Nottingham Trent University and the priorities of external partners, and are intended to support applied, evidence-based change.

Key thematic areas include:

- Culture and communities – research and engagement activities focused on cultural participation, community development, and place-based identity, often involving collaboration with local organisations and residents.
- Insecurity and exploitation – projects examining economic insecurity, labour exploitation, and related social issues, including the production of research and policy reports.
- Local and regional civic engagement – work addressing governance, democratic participation, and policy-making at local and regional levels.
- Policy learning and collaboration – initiatives aimed at improving engagement between researchers and policy actors to support evidence-informed policy development.
- Supporting resilient futures – research exploring resilience in critical systems and occupations, including work informed by national foresight and future-planning initiatives.

Across these thematic areas, Nottingham Civic Exchange undertakes both commissioned and collaborative projects, combining academic research with stakeholder engagement.

== Relationship with Nottingham Trent University ==
As NTU’s designated think tank, Nottingham Civic Exchange contributes to the university’s civic mission and public engagement agenda. Its activities support NTU’s engagement with local authorities, voluntary and community organisations, and policy bodies, with a focus on place-based impact and collaborative knowledge exchange.

The think tank also plays a role in encouraging interdisciplinary collaboration within the university and aligning academic research with real-world policy and practice challenges.

== See also ==
- Nottingham Trent University
