= Confetti Institute of Creative Technologies =

Specialist college and university provider in Nottingham, England

Coordinates: 52.9558°N 1.1435°W

Confetti College
- Type: Public
- Established: 1994
- Parent institution: Access Creative College
- Students: Over 2,000
- Location: Nottingham, United Kingdom
- Campus: Urban
- Website: confetti.ac.uk

Confetti College is a specialist education provider with courses in the Creative Industries. It delivers college courses validated by Access Creative, It has Nottingham campus on Convent Street.

In 2015 the Confetti Media Group was purchased by Nottingham Trent University. The Nottingham campus includes media technology studios and equipment, and has over 2,000 students. Students who complete level 3 college courses have the opportunity to progress onto Higher Education Courses validated by Nottingham Trent University and career pathways of Graduates completing undergraduate and postgraduate Degrees through Nottingham Trent University progress towards careers within the Creative Industries.

Current head of Confetti College is the Executive Dean of Nottingham School of Art and Design, Michael Marsden.

== History ==
Confetti Institute was founded in 1994 by Craig Chettle. It was originally called Confetti Studios. In 2010, Confetti Studios was renamed the Confetti Institute of Creative Technologies, becoming part of the Confetti Media Group, which includes Confetti Constellations, Spool Post, Denizen Records Antenna, Notts TV, and Metronome.

Confetti Institute of Creative Technologies has won the Association of Colleges' Beacon Award in 2009.

In 2013, Confetti Institute was visited by Prince Harry.

In 2018, Confetti opened its new Digital Media Hub, and music venue Metronome, both in the Creative Quarter.

In 2022, Confetti X, an Esports venue and complex, opened in the same building as Metronome. The institution also played host to the opening stages of the inaugural Commonwealth Esports Championships.

In September 2023, Confetti's London campus opened, delivering a similar range of courses to Confetti Nottingham. It's located on Commercial Road in Whitechapel.

As from September 2025, Confetti Institute of Creative Technologies became Confetti College, with only offering Level 3 Extended creative courses. Confetti's main campus became both Nottingham School of Art & Design and Confetti College Campus. In addition, all of Confetti's Undergraduate and Postgraduate courses were transferred to NTU’s School of Art and Design Building.

In November 2026, Access Creative took over the sole management of Confetti, taking over from Nottingham Trent University. It is unknown what this means for the future of Confetti's association with NTU.

== Partnerships ==
Confetti is part of the Confetti Media Group, a hub of creative businesses based in Nottingham that include: Confetti Constellations, Spool Post, Denizen Records Antenna, Notts TV, and Metronome.

Over the years Confetti has built relationships and connections within many areas of creative industries - in Nottingham and further afield. Confetti's local partners include DHP, Notts TV, the Nottingham Poetry Festival, BBC Introducing, Left Lion, Splendour Festival, the Young Creative Awards, as well as national – Screen Skills, Bafta ALBERT, Channel 4, The British Games Institute and Creative England.
