= Medical Technologies Innovation Facility =

Research centre in Nottingham, England

- Abbreviation: MTIF
- Formation: 2020
- Type: Research and innovation facility
- Purpose: Medical technologies and health innovation
- Headquarters: Nottingham, England
- Affiliations: Nottingham Trent University
- Website: mtif.co.uk

The Medical Technologies Innovation Facility (MTIF) is a medical technology research and innovation centre based in Nottingham, England. Operated by Nottingham Trent University, the facility supports the development of medical technologies from early-stage research through to clinical testing and commercialisation, working in partnership with industry, healthcare providers and academic institutions.

MTIF forms part of a £23 million dual-site development designed to strengthen medical technology research and innovation capacity in the East Midlands. The facility has been described as a key component of Nottingham’s growing health technology ecosystem, supporting collaboration between businesses, clinicians and researchers and contributing to regional innovation and economic development.

== History ==
The Medical Technologies Innovation Facility was established in the late 2010s following the identification of barriers to medical device development and translation by researchers at Nottingham Trent University. With support from regional partners, including the D2N2 Local Enterprise Partnership, the facility was developed as a dual-site research and development project with a total investment of £23 million.

The primary MTIF building opened in April 2020 at NTU’s Clifton Campus. A second site, located at the former Boots site within the Nottingham Enterprise Zone, focuses on clinical production and the commercialisation of medical technologies.

== Facilities ==
MTIF comprises a two-storey purpose-built research facility at the Clifton Campus, incorporating laboratories, clean rooms and specialist technical spaces designed to support medical technology research and development. The building was designed by Maber Architects and constructed by Henry Brothers as part of Nottingham Trent University’s campus development programme.

The facility includes ISO 6 standard clean rooms and advanced laboratory environments requiring controlled cleanliness and environmental conditions. The building’s design integrates research, collaboration and reception spaces, and serves as a gateway structure at the Clifton Campus site.

== Research and innovation activities ==
MTIF supports the development of a wide range of medical technologies, including work in biomaterials, cell–material interactions, smart textiles, surgical robotics, product design and prototyping, microbiology, imaging, and hardware–software integration.

The facility works with partners across the East Midlands and beyond to support projects from early-stage prototyping and in vitro testing through to clinical trials conducted in partner hospitals. Activities are designed to support compliance with regulatory frameworks including the Medical Devices Regulation (EU) 2017/745 and the In Vitro Diagnostics Regulation (EU) 2017/746.

== Partnerships and collaboration ==
MTIF operates through partnerships with academic, healthcare and commercial organisations in the United Kingdom and internationally. Strategic partners include regional health innovation bodies, NHS trusts, universities and industry networks supporting medical technology development and adoption.

Commercial collaborations support access to specialist equipment and expertise, enabling research, testing and product development activities for companies operating in the health technology sector.

== Role within Nottingham Trent University ==
As part of Nottingham Trent University’s research and innovation infrastructure, MTIF supports interdisciplinary collaboration between scientists, engineers, clinicians and entrepreneurs. The facility contributes to NTU’s health and life sciences research activity and provides industry-facing services to support medical technology development and knowledge exchange.

== External recognition and regional role ==
The completion of the Medical Technologies Innovation Facility was reported by regional and national business media as a significant investment in medical technology innovation in the East Midlands. Business Live reported that the £23 million dual-site facility was designed to support collaboration between companies, clinicians and researchers, with the aim of accelerating the translation of medical innovations from research to market, improving patient outcomes and stimulating the local economy.

MTIF has also been identified as part of Nottingham’s wider health and life sciences infrastructure. In 2022, Medilink Midlands cited the facility as one of the region’s centres of excellence in medical and health technologies, highlighting its role in supporting innovation partnerships and contributing to Nottingham’s position as a hub for HealthTech and MedTech development in England.

== See also ==
- Nottingham Trent University
- Medical device development
- Health technology
