= URB =

URB or Urb may refer to:

- Urb (surname), an Estonian language surname
- URB (magazine), an American magazine focused on music and urban culture
- United Remnant Band of the Shawnee Nation, a band of Native Americans who hold that they are descended from the Shawnee
- University Radio Bath, student radio station for the University of Bath, England.
- Union of Russia and Belarus or Union State
- University Radio Bailrigg, former name of Bailrigg FM
- Urb., taxonomic author abbreviation of Ignatz Urban (1848–1931), German botanist
