= University of Bath =

University in Bath, Somerset, England

- Motto: Latin: Generatim discite cultus (Virgil, Georgics II)
- Motto in English: Learn the culture proper to each after its kind
- Type: Public
- Established: 1856 (Bristol Trade School); 1885 (Merchant Venturers' Technical College); 1960 (Bristol College of Science and Technology); 1966 (Bath University of Technology)
- Academic affiliations: ACU; EUA; GW4; SETsquared; Universities UK; Defence Universities Alliance
- Endowment: £9.4 million (2025)
- Budget: £416.8 million (2024/25)
- Chancellor: The Duke of Edinburgh
- Vice-Chancellor: Phil Taylor
- Academic staff: 1,660 (2024/25)
- Administrative staff: 2,280 (2024/25)
- Students: 20,530 (2024/25); 18,955 FTE (2024/25)
- Undergraduates: 15,995 (2024/25)
- Postgraduates: 4,535 (2024/25)
- Location: Bath, Somerset, England; 51.38°N 2.33°W
- Campus: Suburban
- Sporting affiliations: Wallace Group; BUCS
- Website: bath.ac.uk

The University of Bath is a public research university in Bath, England. Bath received its royal charter in 1966 as Bath University of Technology, along with a number of other institutions following the Robbins Report. Like the University of Bristol and University of the West of England, Bath traces its roots to the Merchant Venturers' Technical College, established as Bristol Trade School in 1856. The university's main campus is located on Claverton Down, a site overlooking the UNESCO World Heritage city of Bath, and was purpose-built, constructed from 1964 in the modernist style of the times.

In the 2021 Research Excellence Framework, 40% of Bath's submitted research activity achieved the highest possible classification of 4*, defined as world-leading in terms of originality, significance and rigour. 92% was graded 4*/3*, defined as world-leading/internationally excellent. The annual income of the institution for 2024–25 was £416.8 million of which £49.1 million was from research grants and contracts, with an expenditure of £428.2 million.

In 2024, Bath ranked seventh nationally for undergraduate education. The university is a member of the Association of Commonwealth Universities, the Association of MBAs, the European Quality Improvement System, the European University Association, Universities UK and GW4.

== History ==
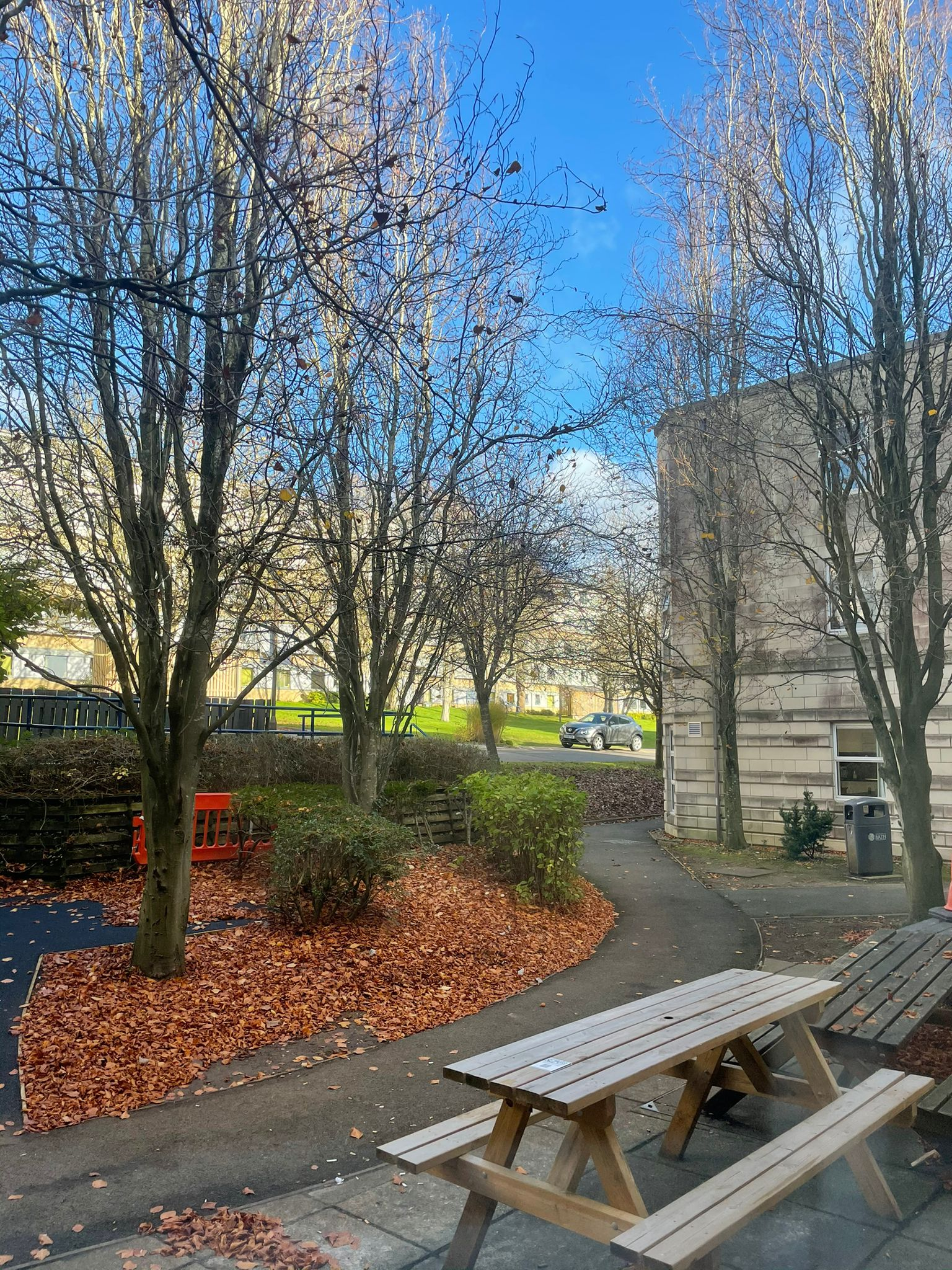
University of Bath campus in autumn

The University of Bath traces its roots to the Bristol Trade School, a technical school established in Bristol in 1856, which became the Merchant Venturers' Technical College in 1885. Meanwhile, in the neighbouring city of Bath, a pharmaceutical school, the Bath School of Pharmacy, was founded in 1907. This became part of the technical college in 1929.

Until 1949, the technical college provided the faculty of engineering for the University of Bristol. In 1949 the Merchant Venturers' moved away from technical education and the link between the college and Bristol University was removed. The technical college was transferred to the Bristol Education Authority and split into the Bristol College of Commerce and the Bristol College of Technology. In 1960 the college of technology was split again, forming Bristol Technical College (part of which would later become the University of the West of England) and the Bristol College of Science and Technology, one of ten technical colleges under the umbrella of the Ministry of Education.

=== University status ===
In 1963, the Robbins Committee report paved the way for the college of science and technology (along with a number of other institutions) to assume university status as Bath University of Technology.

Although the grounds of Kings Weston House, in Bristol, were briefly considered — which then, and until 1969, accommodated the college's School of Architecture and Building Engineering — the City of Bristol was unable to offer the expanding college an appropriately sized single site. Following discussions between the College Principal and the Director of Education in Bath, an agreement was reached to provide the college with a new home in Claverton Down, Bath, on a greenfield site, purchased through a compulsory purchase order from the Candy family of Norwood Farm, overlooking the city.

Construction of the purpose-built campus began in 1964, with the first building, now known as 4 South, completed in 1965, to the deign of RMJM and Partners architectural practice. The royal charter was granted on 25 October 1966. In November 1966, the first degree ceremony took place at the Assembly Rooms in Bath. Over the subsequent decade, new buildings were added as the campus took shape.

In the mid-19th century, there were plans to build a college on the site.

The university logo features the so-called Gorgon's head which is taken, via the university's coat of arms, from a Roman sculpture found within the city. The university pays a peppercorn a year to the city for rent of a 140-acre (57-hectare) parcel of land.

Until 30 October 2012, it was also a member of the 1994 Group.

A report by the Higher Education Funding Council for England into governance at the university was published on 20 November 2017.

=== Glynis Breakwell remuneration ===
In November 2017, frustration with the governance of the university grew, especially concerning the Vice Chancellor, Glynis Breakwell's remuneration. The HEFCE carried out an enquiry and recommended 13 changes to the governance of the university. In November 2017, Breakwell's salary rose by 3.9% (£17,589) to over £468,000 and she was reported as the highest paid Vice Chancellor in the country. The university and College Union had an "emergency meeting" of all staff to discuss the issue and the students' union organised a vote of no confidence involving all undergraduate and postgraduate students.

By August 2017, four MPs had resigned from the advisory board at the University of Bath in protest against the vice-chancellor's pay package. In November 2017 Breakwell agreed to retire, taking a sabbatical on full pay from September 2018 until retirement in February 2019 when a £31,000 car loan to her would be written off. In January 2018 the University Court voted for her immediate departure and demanding the chair of the governing council and remuneration committee should step down, though this decision could not override the existing contractual agreement with Breakwell.

On 5 March 2018, at 13:30, a group of 10 Bath students supporting the UCU strike action occupied the vice chancellor's suite in protest of the university's support for UUK's proposed pension reforms. The occupation was endorsed by Bath MP Wera Hobhouse. The university was criticised for its initial response to the protesters, blocking the entrance to the only freely accessible toilets in the occupied area for the first 21 hours of the occupation. The university's response was criticised by local councillor Joe Rayment, alumnus Marcus Sedgwick, NUS Black Students' officer, and prompted the resignation of an external examiner.

In September 2018, it was announced that Ian H. White would take over from Glynis Breakwell as Vice-Chancellor in April 2019.

== Campus and facilities ==
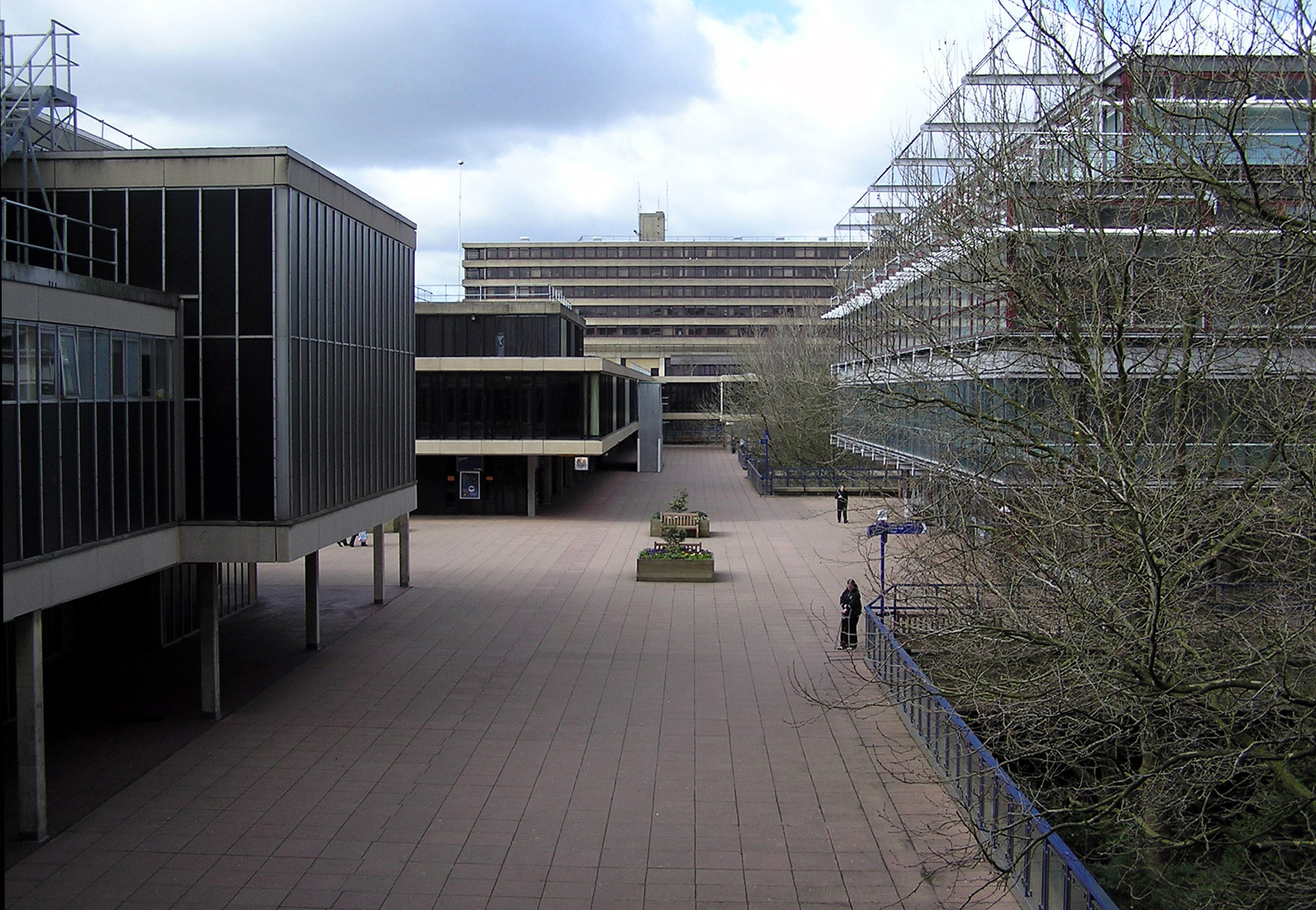
The Parade, a central pedestrian thoroughfare connecting most academic blocks

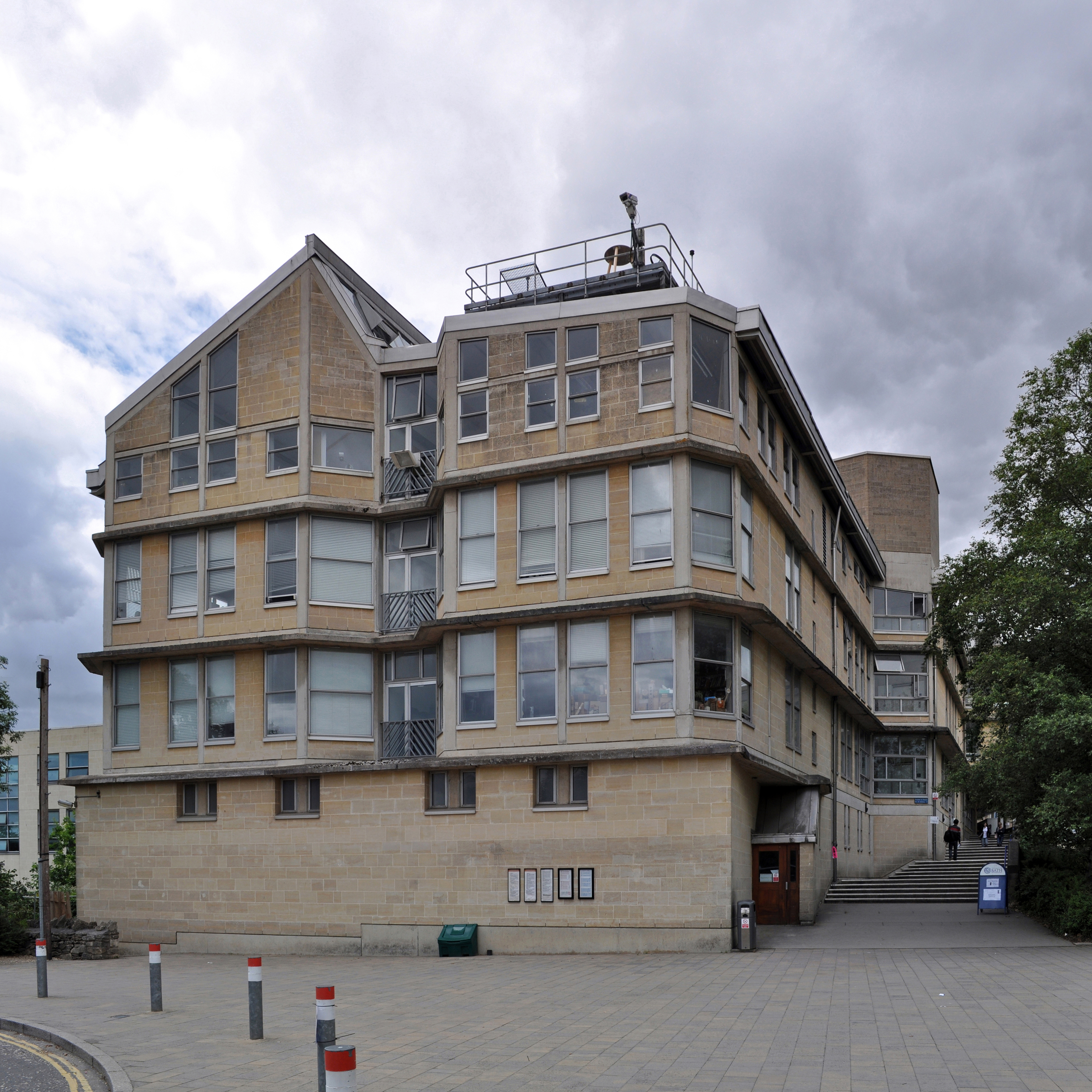
School of Architecture and Building Engineering by Alison and Peter Smithson (1982–88)

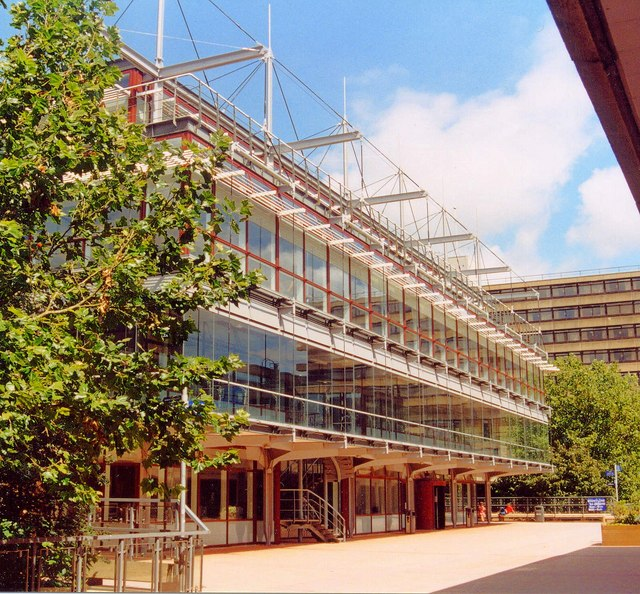
The library

=== Main campus ===
The university's main campus is located on Claverton Down, approximately 1.5 miles from the centre of Bath. The site is compact; it is possible to walk from one end to the other in fifteen minutes. The design involved the separation of vehicular and pedestrian traffic, with road traffic on the ground floors and pedestrians on a raised central thoroughfare, known as the Parade. Buildings would line the parade and student residences built on tower blocks rise from the central thoroughfare. Such plans were mostly followed.

At the centre of the campus is the Library, a facility open round the clock offering computing services, information and research assistance as well as books and journals. A number of outlets are housed around the parade, including restaurants, bars and fast-food cafés and two small supermarkets, as well as academic blocks. Building names are based on their location and distance vis-à-vis the library (e.g. 1 East, 2 East). Odd-numbered buildings are on the same side of the parade as the Library, and even-numbered buildings are on the opposite side.

Buildings along the east–west axis are mostly directly accessible from the parade, which is generally considered to be "level two", but later additions, such as 7 West, 9 West, 3 West North and 8 East, follow the rule less strictly. 7 West is generally accessible only via 5 West or 9 West, and 3 West North, 9 West and 8 East have entrances at ground level at varying distances from the main parade. Buildings on the south of the campus, 1 South to 4 South, are accessible via roads and pedestrian walkways by the university lake and gardens.

Buildings, as in many of the so-called plate glass universities, were constructed in a functional modernist style using concrete, although such designs were later derided for lacking the charm of the Victorian red-brick universities or the ancient and medieval ones. In Bath, there is a particular contrast between the concrete campus and the Georgian style architecture of the World Heritage City of Bath.

The eastern part of the campus is dominated by the Sports Training Village, built in 1992 and enhanced in 2003 with an extension.

The northern perimeter of the university is bounded by student residences Brendon Court, Eastwood, Marlborough Court, Solsbury Court, Norwood House, Osborne House, Polden Court, The Quads, Westwood, and Woodland Court. The original plan for students to be housed in tower blocks above the parade continues with the small number of rooms (110) in Norwood House. However, the second tower block, Wessex House, now hosts offices rather than residences.

The university also owns buildings in the city of Bath, mostly student accommodation dotted around town, including Canal Wharf, Carpenter House, Clevelands Building, John Wood Building and John Wood Court, Pulteney Court and Thornbank Gardens.

There is also an Innovation Centre that provides work space, practical support and expertise to local technology enterprises and entrepreneurial companies that emerge from the university's student and academic research base

Two new buildings were opened in 2017. The Virgil Building, adapted from a former police station, offers a hub and support for students and staff in the centre of Bath, including professional, counselling and careers services, Joblink, a skills centre and learning commons. The university also opened a centre at 83 Pall Mall in central London, with a stated aim of building partnerships and engaging with business, politics and Bath's alumni community in the UK's capital.

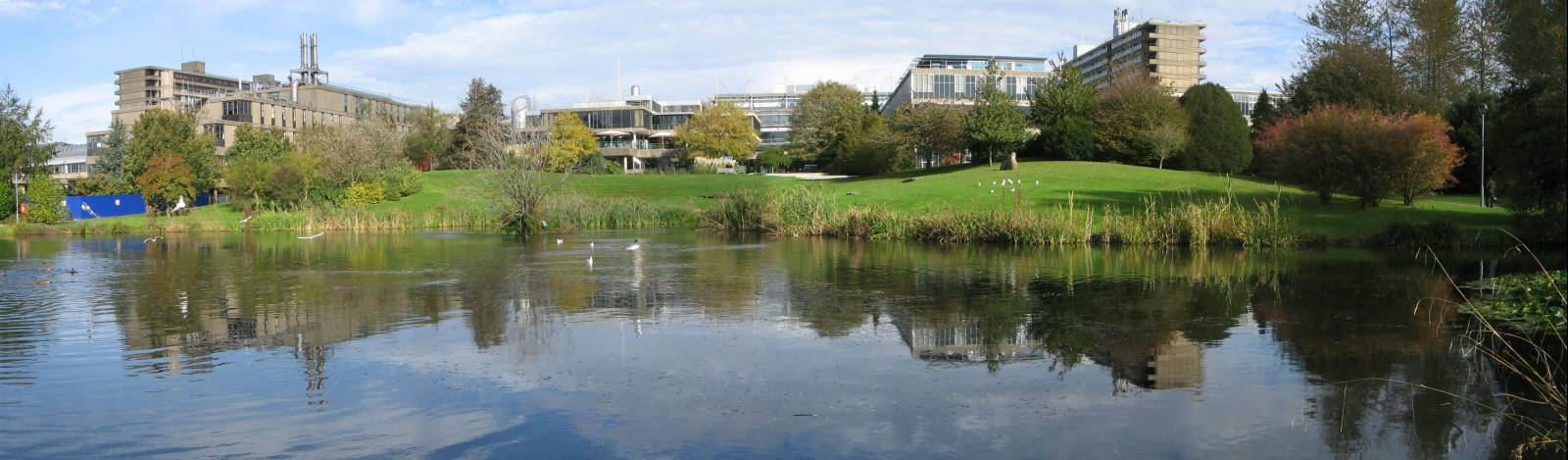
University of Bath (Claverton Down Campus)

Over several years, the grounds have received recognition for their outstanding beauty with awards from Bath in Bloom.

=== Campus developments ===
The university continually upgrades its Claverton Down campus with new teaching blocks. A proposal to move the boundary of the green belt away to the edge of the campus to facilitate further development was agreed in October 2007 by the local council following a public inquiry, although the boundary of the Cotswolds Area of Outstanding Natural Beauty still crosses the site. In July 2005, building 3 West North (officially opened on 27 October) was completed. The deconstruction of the asbestos-contaminated 4 West was completed in mid-2005 and the 4 West building opened in April 2010, providing additional teaching and office space.

Completed projects

- 4 West, complete with Cafe, completed March 2010
- A new Student Centre, completed October 2010
- The East Building, a multifunction building (offices and teaching rooms), completed May 2011
- The Chancellors' Building, new teaching facilities, completed October 2013
- The Quads is a new student accommodation building on campus with 703 en-suite bedrooms, completed summer 2014
- The Edge opened in early 2015 and has teaching facilities, theatre, gallery, performance and rehearsal studios
- 1 West refurbishment to add new learning and research facilities and computer laboratories and offices
- 4 East South, providing research and teaching space for the Faculty of Engineering & Design as well as a cutting edge computing data centre. Opened June 2016
- 10 West, a multifunction building which expanded the Department of Psychology, a new home for the Institute of Policy Research as well as providing dedicated postgraduate study space. Formally opened on 20 July 2016 by Professor Dame Vicky Bruce.
- The Virgil Building, located in a former police station on Manvers Street into a learning zone with office space for student-facing services including study space, training rooms and a coffee bar. Office Space is also provided for the Careers Service, Student Services and others for advice and guidance.
- The Milner Centre for Evolution, a £7 million development dedicated to evolution research. The centre formally opened in September 2018.
- Polden, to provide 300 postgraduate bed spaces on the Western edge of campus close to existing campus accommodation.
- 10 East, a new home for the School of Management, which opened on 7 June 2022.

=== University of Bath in Swindon ===
The university opened a second site, Oakfield Campus, in 2000 on Marlowe Road Swindon, on a site leased from the council. Formerly Oakfield School, the site was jointly funded by the university and Swindon Council. Officially The University of Bath in Swindon, the campus offered undergraduate courses in childhood studies and social work. The campus was closed in the summer of 2008.

Under the Gateway Project, the university had planned to build a major new campus next to the Great Western Hospital and the Coate Water nature reserve. The project had met opposition from environmentalists and locals but had met with Government approval. The university withdrew from the project in March 2007 citing "prevailing planning and funding conditions".

== Organisation and administration ==
The university is divided into four faculties and each faculty into various departments.

Faculty of Engineering & Design

- Architecture and Civil Engineering
- Chemical Engineering
- Electronic & Electrical Engineering
- Mechanical Engineering

Faculty of Humanities & Social Sciences

- Economics
- Education
- Health
- Politics, Languages & International Studies
- Psychology
- Social & Policy Sciences

Faculty of Management

- School of Management

Faculty of Science

- Life Sciences
- Chemistry
- Computer Science
- Mathematical Sciences
- Natural Sciences
- Physics

=== Finances ===
In the financial year ending 31 July 2024, Bath had a total income of £390.5 million (2022/23 – £362.9 million) and total expenditure of £308.1 million (2022/23 – £358.8 million). Key sources of income included £219.5 million from tuition fees and education contracts (2022/23 – £205.9 million), £41.2 million from funding body grants (2022/23 – £46.7 million), £49.2 million from research grants and contracts (2022/23 – £44.8 million), £7.6 million from investment income (2022/23 – £5.6 million) and £3.4 million from donations and endowments (2022/23 – £1.5 million).

At year end, Bath had endowments of £8.4 million (2022/23 – £6.9 million) and total net assets of £1.146 billion (2022/23 – £911.9 million).

== Academic profile ==
The university's major academic strengths have been engineering, the physical sciences, mathematics and technology. Today, the university is also strong in management, humanities, architecture and the social sciences. Courses place a strong emphasis on vocational education; the university recommends students to take a one-year industry placement in the penultimate year of their course.

According to the latest government assessments, Bath has 15 subjects rated "excellent", the highest on the scale. These are: Pharmacy and Pharmacology; Business and Management (AMBA accredited); Architecture and Civil Engineering; Economics; Computer Science; Electronic and Electrical engineering; Mechanical Engineering (IMechE accredited); Mathematics, Statistics and Operational research; Education; Molecular Biosciences; Biosciences; Physics and Astronomy; Politics; Sport; Social Policy and Administration.

=== Research ===
Bath was ranked joint 25th amongst multi-faculty institutions in the UK for the quality (GPA) of its research and 28th for its Research Power (the grade point average score of a university, multiplied by the full-time equivalent number of researchers submitted) in the 2021 Research Excellence Framework. Bath was ranked joint 12th in the UK amongst multi-faculty institutions for the quality (GPA) of its research and 33rd for its Research Power in the 2014 Research Excellence Framework. Over half of the submissions were ranked in the top 10 nationally in their Units of Assessment. 6 out of 13 submissions were ranked in the top 20.

Bath has been awarded the Queen's Anniversary Prize twice. In 2011, the university received the award for the Department of Social & Policy Sciences' 'Influential research into child poverty and support for vulnerable people'. The university also received the prize in 2000 to recognise the 'invaluable services to industrial and scientific communities' of the Centre for Power Transmission & Motion Control.

=== Rankings and reputation ===
Rankings
National rankings
- Complete (2027): 9
- Guardian (2027): 8
- Times / Sunday Times (2027): 8

Global rankings
- ARWU (2026): 501–600
- QS (2027): 125
- THE (2026): 251–300

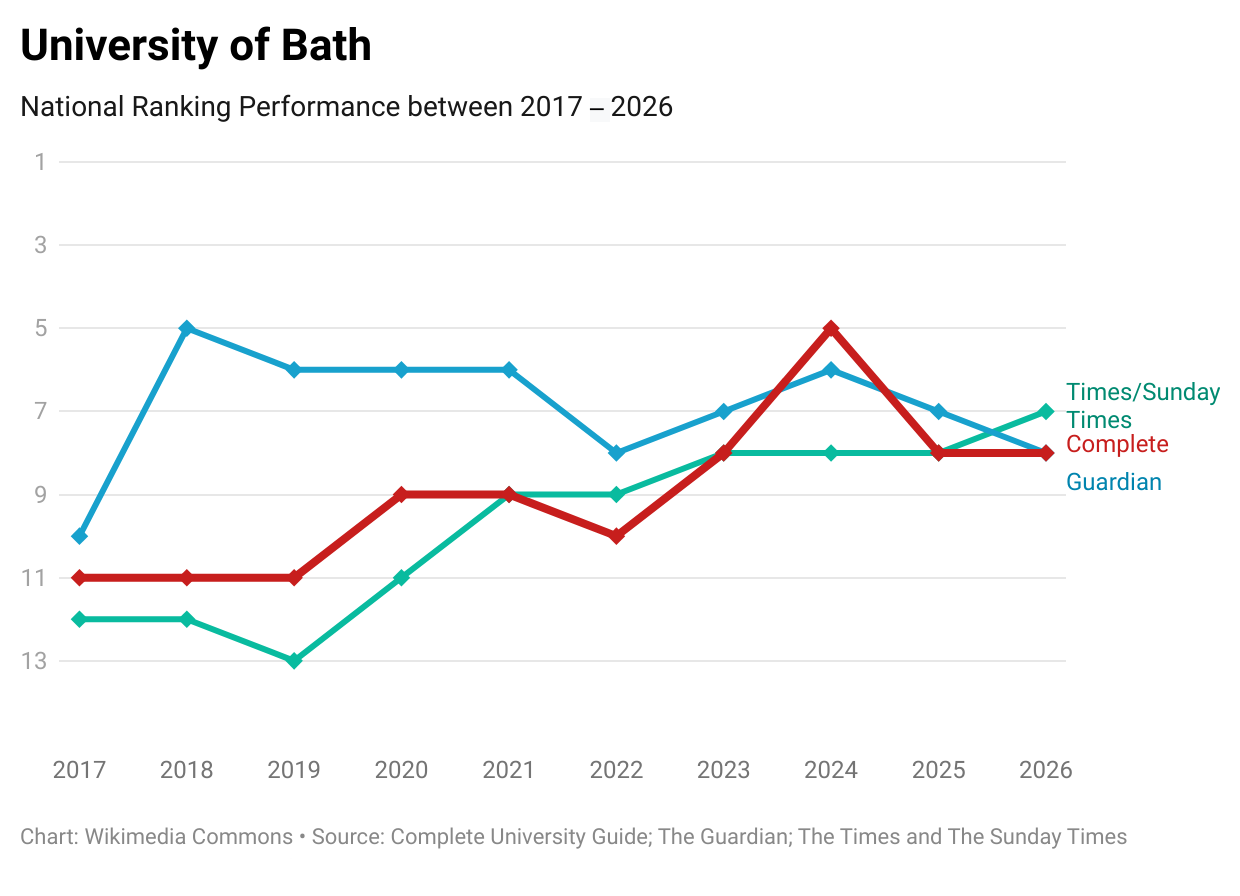
University of Bath's national league table performance over the past ten years

National

The University of Bath received a Gold award as part of the UK Government's Teaching Excellence Framework (TEF). The framework evaluates universities on criteria including teaching quality, learning environment and student outcomes, taking into account factors such as student satisfaction, retention rates and employment.

Bath was ranked eighth in the 2025 Complete University Guide, with 25 subjects placing in the top-10 nationwide. Marketing ranked first in the country with eight further subjects in the top-three: accounting and finance, aerospace engineering, architecture, biomedical sciences, business and management, social policy, sociology, sports science.

In The Sunday Times 10-year (1998–2007) average ranking of British universities based on consistent league table performance, Bath was ranked 12th overall in the UK. Bath was one of only eight universities (along with the G5, St Andrews and Warwick) to have never left the top 15 in one of the three main domestic rankings between 2008 and 2017. Bath has been named as the 'University of the Year' by The Sunday Times Good University Guide 2023.

According to data released by the Department for Education in 2018, Bath was rated as the 7th best university in the UK for boosting male graduate earnings with male graduates seeing a 22.2% increase in earnings compared to the average graduate, and the 8th best university for females, with female graduates seeing a 15.2% increase in earnings compared to the average graduate. Bath was ranked 13th out of 122 UK institutions in the 2017 Times Higher Education (THE) Student Experience Survey. Bath students were joint most likely to recommend the university to their friends.

International

Globally, Bath was ranked #148 in the QS WUR 2024, #251–300 in the Times WUR 2023, #401–500 in the ARWU 2022, #167 in the 2017 Leiden Ranking, and #409 in the USNWR Best Global Universities Rankings 2022–2023.

=== Admissions ===
UCAS Admission Statistics
	2025	2024	2023	2022	2021
Applications (Note: Main scheme applications, International and UK)	40,635	38,150	34,395	32,605	30,765
Accepted	4,865	4,820	4,750	4,455	4,030
Applications/Accepted Ratio	8.4	7.9	7.2	7.3	7.6
Overall Offer Rate (%)	64.7	65.0	71.2	58.5	65.2
↳ UK only (%) (Note: UK domiciled applicants)	61.4	62.7	70.6	55.2	62.7
Average Entry Tariff	—N/a	—N/a	172	173	181
↳ Top three exams (Note: The maximum tariff score for three exams is 168: the equivalent of A*A*A* at A-Level, 777 at HL for the IB Diploma Programme, or AAA at Advanced Higher)	—N/a	—N/a	155.4	156.4	158.8

HESA Student Body Composition (2024/25)
Domicile and Ethnicity	Total
British White (Note: Not be confused solely with White British)	57%
British Ethnic Minorities (Note: Includes those who indicate that they identify as Asian, Black, Mixed Heritage, Arab or any other ethnicity except White.)	19%
International EU	5%
International Non-EU	19%
Undergraduate Widening Participation Indicators
Female	45%
Independent School	26%
Low Participation Areas (Note: Calculated from the Polar4 measure, using Quintile1, in England and Wales. Calculated from the Scottish Index of Multiple Deprivation (SIMD) measure, using SIMD20, in Scotland.)	5%

In the 2024/25 academic year, the student body consisted of 20,530 students, composed of 15,995 undergraduates and 4,535 postgraduate students. The university is consistently designated as a 'high-tariff' institution by the Department for Education, with the average undergraduate entrant to the university in recent years amassing between 155–159 UCAS Tariff points in their top three pre-university qualifications – the equivalent of A*AA to A*A*A at A-Level. Based on 2022/23 HESA entry standards data published in domestic league tables, which include a broad range of qualifications beyond the top three exam grades, the average student at the University of Bath achieved 173 points – the 12th highest in the country.

Around 32% of students are international students (those with non-British domicile), representing 147 nationalities with the largest number coming from China (including Hong Kong), France, India and Malaysia. 27.4% of Bath's undergraduates are privately educated, the eleventh highest proportion amongst mainstream British universities. In the 2016–17 academic year, the university had a domicile breakdown of 71:10:19 of UK:EU:non-EU students respectively with a female to male ratio of 47:53.

== Student life ==
=== Sports and TeamBath ===
Team Bath is the university's sporting organisation. In addition to entering teams in BUCS intervarsity competitions, Team Bath has entered teams in national leagues and competitions. Team Bath F.C. reached the first round proper of the 2002–03 FA Cup. They become the first university team to reach this stage since Oxford University A.F.C. in 1880. In 2005–06 the netball team were both founder members and the inaugural champions of the Netball Superleague. They were Superleague champions again in 2006–07, 2008–09, 2009–10 and 2013. The field hockey club enter a team in the Men's England Hockey League.

Team Bath's main sports complex is the Sports Training Village based at the University of Bath campus at Claverton Down.

=== Students' union ===
The University of Bath Students' Union, (formerly BUSU), now known as The SU University of Bath, has been recognised by the NUS as one of the top three in the UK. The SU is led by 6 Student officers.

The SU runs over 100 clubs and societies including sports clubs, cultural, arts, interest and faith societies. Some notable examples are:

- Bath RAG collects money for local and national charities, raising over £1 million since 1966
- The Arts Societies (including student theatre, musicals, dance, and various musical groups) performs plays and other shows to audiences both on campus and in the town, with support provided by Backstage Technical Services.
- The Students' Union faith groups include Hindu, Buddhist, Christian, Islamic, and Jewish societies.
- Three student media outlets: a fortnightly student newspaper, Bath Time; a radio station, University Radio Bath; and a television station, Campus TV (CTV)
- The Makerspace Society, a student-run group that manages 3D printers, laser cutters, and other fabrication equipment.
- The University of Bath Political Interviewing Society, which organises non-partisan interviews with political figures. Past guests have included former ambassadors and politicians, including former UK Member of Parliament John Penrose.

== Coat of arms ==
The College of Arms has granted the University the following arms:

Coat of arms of University of Bath
Granted 15 November 1966 Crest On a wreath Or, argent and azure, Out of a mural crown argent, an eagle, wings expanded and inverted, Or, supporting with the dexter claw a key, wards upward and outward, silver. Escutcheon Azure, a sword in pale argent, hilt and pommel and quillons Or, the point ensigned by a Watt governor proper, between in fess two heads of Sul Or. Supporters On the dexter side a wyvern erect vert charged on the body with mullets, each of six points, Or; and on the sinister side a unicorn sejant erect Or, armed, unguled, crined and tufted sable, charged on the body with mullets of six points vert; the whole upon a compartment of water harry wavy of four argent and azure between two river banks proper, sprouting therefrom roses argent, barbed seeded, slipped and leaved proper. Motto Generatim discite cultus. Symbolism Sul was a Celtic God identified by the Romans with their own Minerva, and Bath was known as Aquae Sulis. The choice of Sul depicted by a conventional rendering of his head as found carved at Bath is fitting indeed, and it can be distinguished from a sun in splendour by the fact that the face is moustached, and eared, and the hair thereof is entwined with and blends with wavy rays of heat that surround the whole. A Watt Governor is a device designed in 1788 by James Watt who adapted an older type of governor to control his steam engine where it regulates the admission of steam into the cylinder. It is used here as a symbol for a technical university.

== Notable alumni ==
=== Arts and media ===
- Ash Atalla, TV producer
- Rob Bell, TV presenter
- Keith Christmas, English folk/rock musician
- Ian Cognito, real name Paul Barbieri, comedian
- Nigel Dick, pop music video producer
- Rob Fisher, keyboardist and songwriter with Naked Eyes and Climie Fisher
- Neil Fox, radio DJ and TV presenter
- Mike Graham, journalist and radio broadcaster for TalkSport
- Gareth Gwynn, comedy writer and presenter for radio and TV
- Sean Li, Hong Kong film actor
- Chuck Pfarrer, American screenwriter, novelist, former US Navy SEAL
- Katherine Roberts, author
- Russell Senior, formerly of the band Pulp
- Jonty Usborne, radio engineer

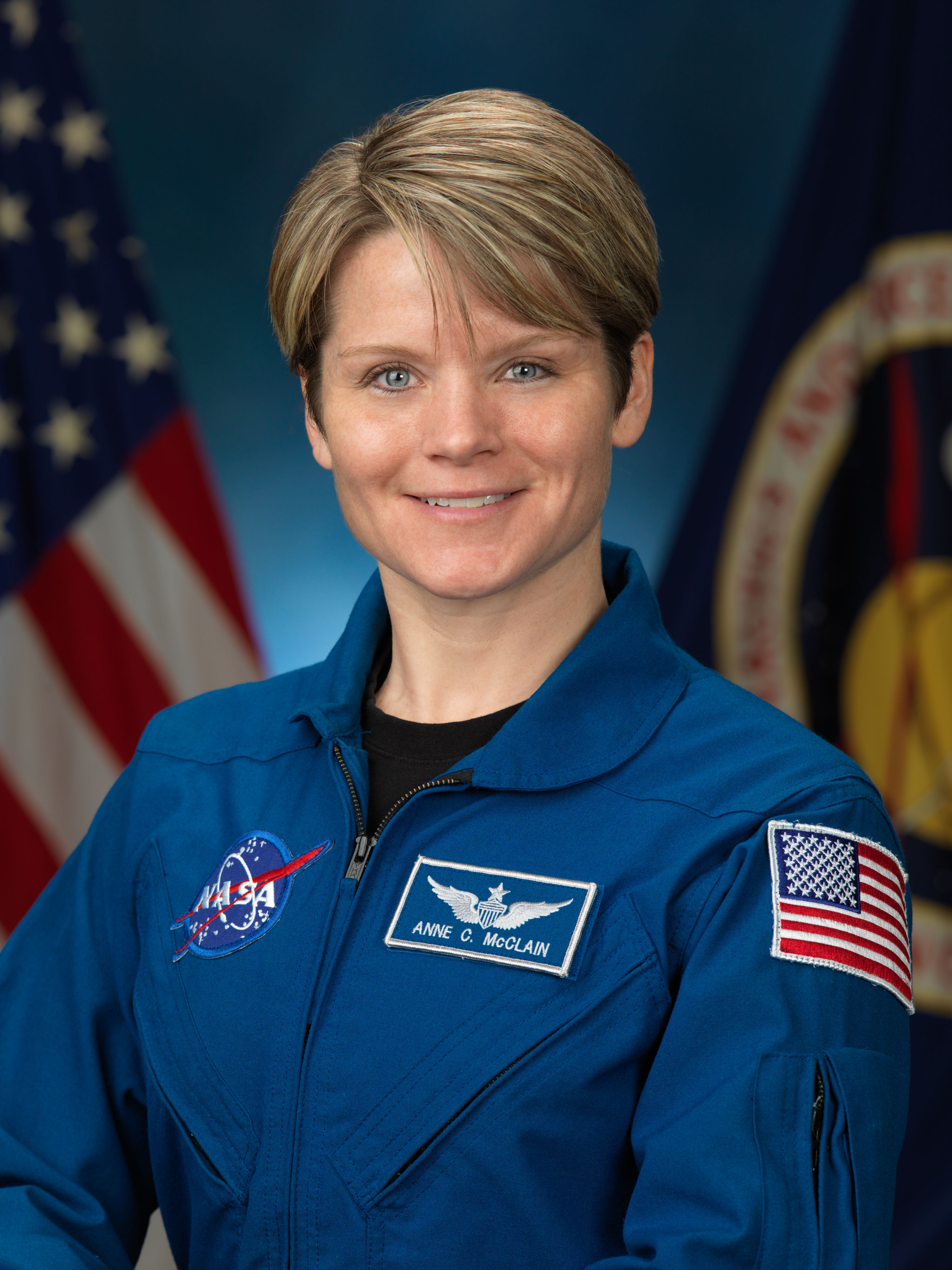
Anne McClain, NASA astronaut

=== Politicians, lawyers, and civil servants ===
- Falah Mustafa Bakir, Foreign Minister of Iraqi Kurdistan
- Sir Stephen Dalton, Chief of Air Staff, RAF
- Hassan Diab, former Prime Minister of Lebanon
- Don Foster, Baron Foster of Bath, Liberal Democrat peer, former MP for Bath
- Sandra Gidley, Liberal Democrat, former MP for Romsey
- Mohamed Fahmy Hassan, Chairman of Maldives Civil Service Commission
- Mansoor Hekmat, Iranian Communist Leader
- Yang Jiechi, Foreign Minister of the People's Republic of China
- Eric Joyce, Labour MP for Falkirk
- Tony Kerpel, retired Conservative politician and adviser
- T S Krishnamurthy, former Chief Election Commissioner of India
- David Kurten, Leader of the Heritage Party
- Edward Lowassa, former Prime Minister of the United Republic of Tanzania
- Anne McClain, member of the 2013 NASA Astronaut Class
- Mohammad Tufik Rahim, former Iraqi Minister of Industry and Mines
- Julia Reid, UK Independence Party MEP
- José Manuel Restrepo Abondano, Minister of Finance and Public Credit and Minister of Commerce, Industry and Tourism of Colombia
- Karin Smyth, Labour MP for Bristol South

=== Business people ===
- Sir Robert Fry, Executive Chairman of the McKinney Rogers Group, former Vice President of Hewlett-Packard, served as Commandant General Royal Marines
- Sir Julian Horn-Smith, former COO of Vodafone
- Justin King, former CEO of Sainsbury's
- Kieran O'Neill, entrepreneur
- Anisha Rosnah, founder of Silk Collective and wife to Prince Abdul Mateen
- Tan Hooi Ling, co-founder and Chief Operating Officer of Grab Holdings Inc.
- Stewart Till, Chairman of United International Pictures and Millwall FC
- Bob Wigley, former Chairman Merrill Lynch, Europe, Middle East and Africa; Chairman of Yell Group plc

=== Academics ===
- Doug Altman, founder and Director of Centre for Statistics in Medicine and Cancer Research, UK Medical Statistics Group
- Tom Crick, Professor of Digital Society and Policy at the University of Bristol, and Chief Scientific Adviser to the UK Government's Department for Culture, Media and Sport
- Nigel Healey, Vice Chancellor at Fiji National University
- Elena Korosteleva, Director of the Institute for Global Sustainable Development at the University of Warwick
- Florence Wambugu, African plant pathologist and virologist
- Philippe B. Wilson, clinical chemist, medical researcher and academic, and Chief Scientific Officer of NHS Willows Health
- Salleh Mohammad Yasin, Director of International Institute for Global Health at the United Nations University; former Vice-Chancellor of the National University of Malaysia

=== Sports personalities ===
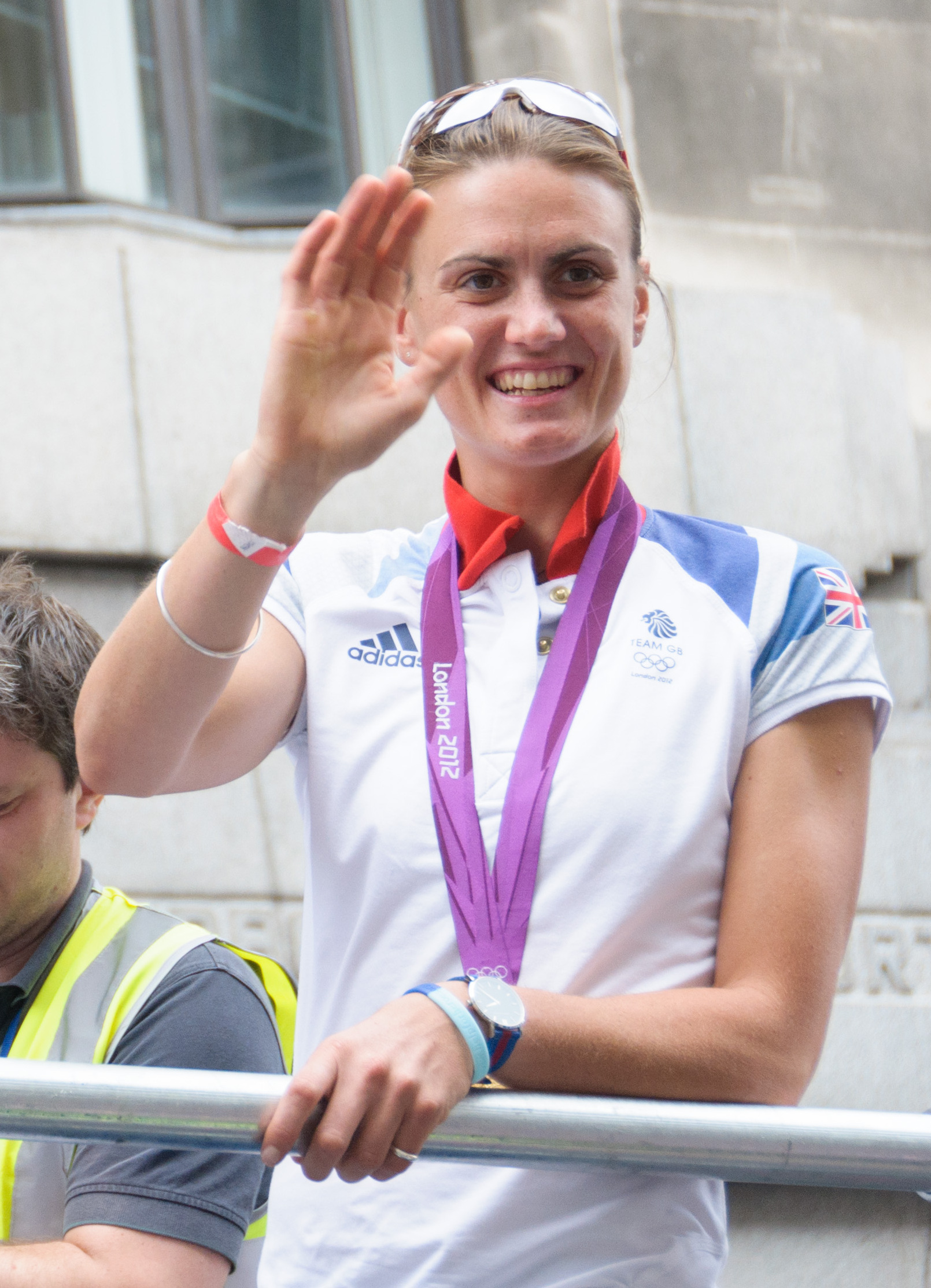
Heather Stanning, gold medallist in rowing

- Sandy Abi-Elias, Lebanon international footballer
- Prisca Awiti Alcaraz, Mexican and British judoka who won silver for Mexico in the under 63kg category
- Marcus Bateman, former British rower
- Kieran Bird, British swimmer, won gold in the 4 × 200 metre freestyle relay in the 2024 Olympics
- Steve Borthwick, former Bath and England rugby union player
- Luke Charteris, Wales international rugby union player
- Pamela Cookey, member of the England netball team that won bronze at the Melbourne 2006 Commonwealth Games
- Tom Dean, British swimmer, competed in the 2020 and 2024 Summer Olympics, winning three gold medals
- Rachel Dunn, international English netball player
- Joe El-Abd, RC Toulonnais rugby union player
- Morgan Evans, Gloucestershire All Golds rugby league player
- Steven Forshaw, British powerlifter who won British, European and World Championship titles in 2025
- Kelly Gallagher, alpine skier, won Britain's first ever Winter Paralympic gold medal during Sochi 2014 Paralympic Games
- Sean Gelael, Indonesian racing driver, Formula One test driver for Toro Rosso from 2017 to 2018, runner-up in the LMP2 class of the FIA World Endurance Championship in 2021 and 2022
- Mark Hardinges, cricketer
- Kate Howey, British judo player, represented Great Britain at four Olympiads; winning bronze at Barcelona in 1992 and silver in Sydney
- James Hudson, London Irish and England Saxons rugby union player
- Michael Jamieson, swimmer, won the silver medal in the 200-metre breaststroke at the London 2012 Summer Olympics
- Katy Livingston, modern pentathlon, competed in Beijing Olympics and won individual bronze at the 2008 World Championships
- Richard Mantell, played for the GB hockey team at the Beijing Summer Olympics
- Samantha Murray, modern pentathlete, won the silver medal at the London 2012 Summer Olympics
- Marilyn Okoro, 400m and 800m runner who made her Olympic debut in Beijing
- Craig Pickering, Olympic 100m sprinter, World Championship medalist and bobsleigher
- Gareth Rees, Glamorgan CCC cricketer
- Ben Rushgrove, T36 100m silver medal at the Beijing 2008 Paralympic Games
- Kate Shortman, British swimmer, won silver in artistic swimming at the 2024 Olympics
- Jon Sleightholme, former English Rugby player
- Heather Stanning, gold medal for British women's rowing at the London 2012 Summer Olympics
- Matt Stevens, Bath, England and British and Irish Lions rugby union player
- Sam Underhill, England international rugby player and Bath rugby
- Lloyd Wallace, British freestyle skier, competed in the 2018 Winter Olympics in Pyeongchang, South Korea
- Sam Weale, modern pentathlon, represented Great Britain at the Beijing 2008 Summer Olympics
- Amy Williams, British skeleton gold medalist at the 2010 Winter Olympics
- Becky Wilde, British rower, won bronze in double sculls at the 2024 Paris Olympics

== See also ==
- Armorial of UK universities
- College of advanced technology (United Kingdom)
- List of universities in the United Kingdom
- University of Bath Department of Psychology
- University of Bath School of Management
