= Philippe B. Wilson =

Franco-British healthcare scientist

Philippe B. Wilson FRSB FLS FRSM FRSPH
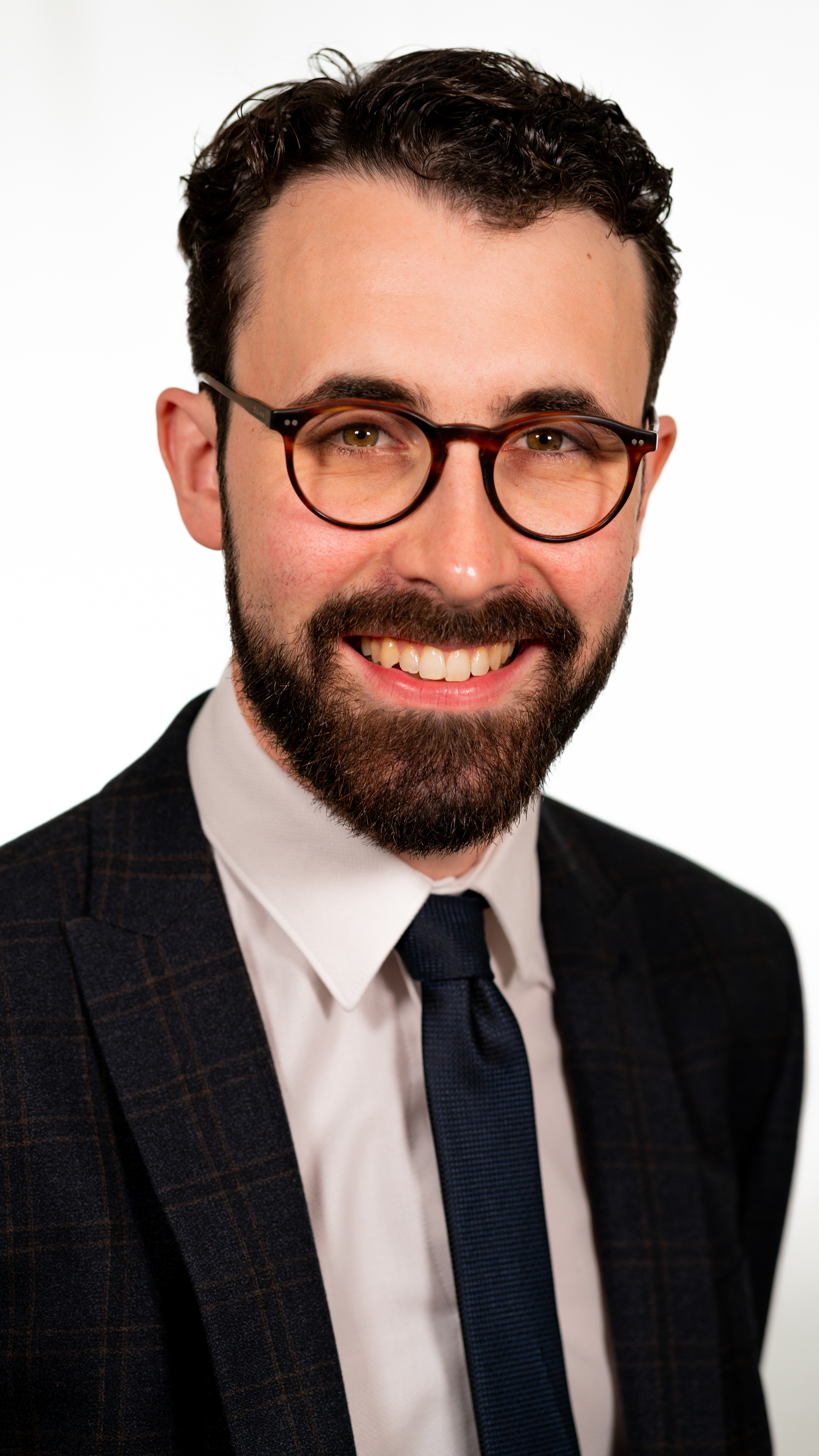
- Education: University of Bath
- Awards: Forbes 30 Under 30 Europe (2018); Royal Society of Chemistry Joseph Black Medal (2019)
- Scientific career
- Fields: Analytical chemistry, metabolomics, genomics, One Health
- Workplaces: University of Bath; De Montfort University; Nottingham Trent University; York St John University; National Health Service; Buckinghamshire New University; University of Nottingham
- Thesis: Towards Isotope Effect Calculations in the Supramolecular Age (2017)

Philippe B. Wilson is a Franco-British healthcare scientist, academic and entrepreneur. His work spans analytical chemistry and sensing, metabolomics, clinical research, livestock genomics and One Health. He is an honorary professor of One Health at the University of Nottingham, executive chairman of HH Global Holdings and president of the Royal Society of Medicine's Section of One Health and Multispecies Medicine for the 2025–2027 term.

Wilson is a member of the UK Genetics for Livestock and Equines Committee, which advises the Department for Environment, Food and Rural Affairs (Defra) and the devolved administrations of Scotland, Wales and Northern Ireland. He is also a member of the Committee on Toxicity of Chemicals in Food, Consumer Products and the Environment, which advises the Food Standards Agency, the Department of Health and Social Care and other government bodies, and chairs Defra's National Livestock Biobank Task Group. He was included in the 2018 Forbes 30 Under 30 Europe list for Science and Healthcare and received the Royal Society of Chemistry's Joseph Black Award in 2019.

== Early life and education ==
Wilson grew up in Somerset, where he farmed cattle, sheep and poultry from an early age. He kept Hebridean and Soay sheep, Dexter cattle and native poultry breeds, and developed an interest in animal science, medicine and genetics. He studied chemistry at the University of Bath, graduating with a MChem in 2014 and a PhD in 2017. His doctoral thesis examined computational approaches to isotope effects in supramolecular chemical systems.

== Career and research ==
Wilson joined De Montfort University in December 2016 as an Early Career Academic Fellow. By 2018, he was a lecturer in biological chemistry and cheminformatics, and he later became an associate professor.

He subsequently became professor of One Health at Nottingham Trent University and chief scientific officer of Willows Health, a NHS primary care network in Leicester. In 2021, he co-directed the launch of Nottingham Trent University's Doctoral Training Academy in Healthcare and Clinical Practice. The partnership with Willows Health enabled primary-care professionals to undertake practice-based doctoral research.

Wilson later served as associate pro vice-chancellor for innovation and knowledge exchange and professor of One Health at York St John University. He subsequently became an honorary professor of One Health at the University of Nottingham.

Wilson's research developed from computational chemistry into molecular sensing and metabolic profiling. He co-authored a study using nitrogen-vacancy centres in diamond for dynamic quantum sensing of paramagnetic species. His other publications applied low-field benchtop nuclear magnetic resonance spectroscopy and computational analysis to metabolic profiling and possible point-of-care diagnostics. This work included studies of human urine and feline urine in chronic kidney disease.

At Nottingham Trent University, Wilson's group extended this work across metabolomic, proteomic and genomic studies of human and animal health. He also worked on clinical trials through his academic and NHS roles. These included the phase-three TACKLE trial of tixagevimab/cilgavimab for the early treatment of COVID-19, in which a Willows Health practice recruited the first participant in the global study. Wilson later co-authored a 2024 evaluation of an integrated chronic kidney disease programme in a Leicester primary-care network.

== Agriculture and livestock conservation ==
Farming and livestock conservation continued alongside Wilson's work in chemistry and healthcare. He was a trustee of the Poultry Club of Great Britain from 2017 to 2023 and chaired its Poultry and Eggs Committee. He chaired the Rare Poultry Society from 2019 to 2020 and became an accredited Panel B poultry judge.

Wilson co-edited the seventh edition of British Poultry Standards, published by Wiley in 2018. He later co-authored The Complete Handbook of Poultry, published by Wiley in 2025.

In 2020, Wilson and Geoffrey Davison translated Alain Hennache and Michel Ottaviani's two-volume French work Monographie des faisans into English. Published by the World Pheasant Association as Monograph of the Pheasants, the resulting single-volume work covers pheasant taxonomy, distribution, behaviour, captive breeding and conservation, with an appendix on junglefowl.

Wilson's agricultural work also developed into livestock-genetics policy. In July 2018, he was appointed to the Farm Animal Genetic Resources Committee, which advised Defra and the devolved administrations on the conservation and sustainable use of livestock genetic resources. The committee was relaunched in 2022 as the UK Genetics for Livestock and Equines Committee, on which he continued to serve. He later became chair of Defra's National Livestock Biobank Task Group.

His research in this area included a review, co-authored with Huw Jones, of genomic technologies in animal production and conservation. He also co-authored studies of the population genetics of the endangered Cleveland Bay horse and genomic methods for characterising bioaerosols in livestock facilities. Wilson was part of the Nottingham Trent University team commissioned to undertake a large-scale DNA study of the critically endangered Eriskay pony.

== Enterprise and public roles ==
Alongside his academic career, Wilson co-founded ventures in laboratory testing, antimicrobial lighting, biotechnology and research and development. These included a laboratory established in London during the COVID-19 pandemic. He later became executive chairman of HH Global Holdings.

In 2026, Wilson became a trustee of the Humanimal Trust, a charity that promotes collaboration between human and veterinary medicine, and an independent member of Buckinghamshire New University's governing council.

Wilson also serves on the Committee on Toxicity of Chemicals in Food, Consumer Products and the Environment. The independent scientific committee advises the Food Standards Agency, the Department of Health and Social Care and other government bodies on the toxicity of chemicals.

Wilson began a two-year term as president of the Royal Society of Medicine's Comparative Medicine Section in October 2025. During his presidency, the section was renamed the Section of One Health and Multispecies Medicine. Its programme was broadened to emphasise clinically relevant One Health education and exchange among human-health, veterinary and scientific disciplines.

== Honours ==
Wilson was included in the 2018 Forbes 30 Under 30 Europe list for Science and Healthcare. In 2019, he received the Royal Society of Chemistry's Joseph Black Award and was represented by the element krypton in the International Union of Pure and Applied Chemistry's Periodic Table of Younger Chemists. He was included in The Analytical Scientist's Power List in 2021.
