= Jonty =

Jonty is an English masculine given name, that occurs as a diminutive form of Jonathan.

== Notable people ==
- Jonty Bush, Australian politician (female)
- Jonty Driver, South African activist
- Jonty Harrison, British musician
- Jonty Hurwitz, British artist
- Jonty Jenner, Jersey cricketer
- Jonty Parkin, British rugby league player
- Jonty Rhodes, South African cricketer
- Jonty Usborne, British broadcast engineer
- Jonty Faull, Australian rules footballer
