= Department of Psychology, University of Bath =

Department of the University of Bath

University of Bath Department of Psychology
- Type: Academic department
- Established: 1997
- Affiliation: University of Bath
- Head of Department: Professor Mark Brosnan
- Academic staff: Approx. 50
- Students: 1000
- Undergraduates: 800
- Postgraduates: 200
- Location: Bath, Somerset, United Kingdom
- Website: bath.ac.uk/psychology/

The University of Bath Department of Psychology is a department within the Faculty of Humanities and Social Sciences of The University of Bath. The department is consistently ranked within the top five departments in the United Kingdom for undergraduate Psychology degrees. In 2017, the department's BSc/MSci programme was ranked 1st in the Guardian's university guide, 2nd in The Complete University Guide and 3rd in The Times & Sunday Times Good University Guide 2017.

== Location and facilities ==
The department is based in the 10 West (10W) building on the far West of the University of Bath's Claverton Down campus. The building was opened in July 2016 by Professor Dame Vicki Bruce and cost £30 million.

The department has several specialised laboratories, as well as general use PC labs. This includes a virtual reality lab, sensory & pain labs, an eye tracker lab, a psychobiology lab, an electroencephalography (EEG) lab, a developmental psychology lab and a social psychology lab. The department also has a BioPac lab, which allows for measuring physiological factors including galvanic skin response, electromyography and EEG.

== History ==
In September 2016, Professor Gregory Maio replaced Professor Bas Verplanken as the head of department. The department celebrated its 20th anniversary in May 2017.

Recent studies conducted in the department involve hoarding behaviour, smart energy meters, recognition of facial expressions by adolescents with conduct disorder and cycling safety.

== Programmes ==
=== Undergraduate ===
The department offers four different undergraduate programmes, two of which are Bachelors of Science (BSc) and two of which are Undergraduate Master's (MSci). All of these courses are accredited by The British Psychological Society, giving graduates a Graduate Basis for Chartered Membership of the society.

- BSc (Hons) Psychology - 3 years
- BSc (Hons) Psychology (with placement year) - 4 years
- MSci (Hons) Psychology - 4 years
- MSci (Hons) Psychology (with placement year) - 5 years

The undergraduate programmes are highly competitive, with 58% of applicants receiving offers, and the average applicant having 152 UCAS points, or A*AA at A level. 71% of entrants studied Psychology prior to attending the university. The most common jobs following graduation are health professionals, followed by business and public service associate professionals and teaching and educational professionals.

=== Postgraduate ===
The department also has several postgraduate degree programmes:

- MSc Applied Clinical Psychology
- MSc Health Psychology
- Doctorate in Clinical Psychology (DClinPsy)
- Masters of Research (MRes)
- Master of Philosophy (MPhil)
- Doctor of Philosophy (PhD)

== Research ==
The department undertakes research in many areas of psychology, including cognitive, developmental, clinical, health, social and environmental psychology.

The department has four main research themes:

- Behaviour Change and Mental Health Interventions
- BioSocial, Cognitive-Affective Psychology
- Digital Behaviour and Change
- Identities in Social and Digital Contexts

Other research interests of the department include pain, health psychology, neuroimaging and brain stimulation, emotion and decision making, social cognition, education technology, multisensory perception and organizational psychology.

The department is home to The Centre for Applied Autism Research (CAAR).
