= Fiji Maritime Academy =

Coordinates: 18.1506°S 178.4509°E

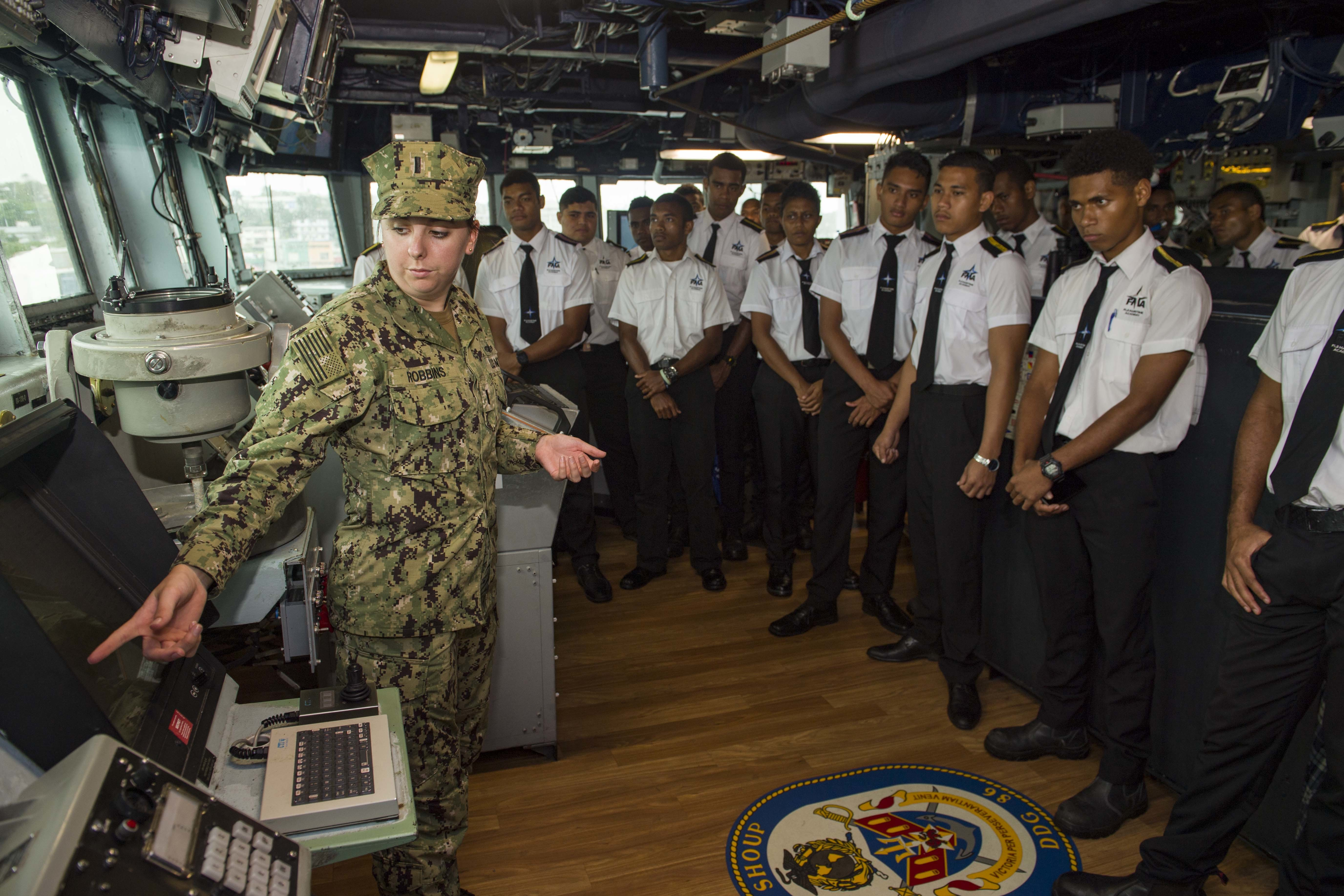
Students from the Fiji Maritime Academy tour the bridge of a visiting US Navy destroyer.

Fiji Maritime Academy is a college that trains students how to be ships' officers, located in Suva, the capital of Fiji.

In the 1970s Fiji National University contained a School of Maritime Studies. Political unrest disrupted the University. In 2014 the government of Fiji called upon the Colombo International Nautical & Engineering College, an institution in Sri Lanka, to help re-establish a nautical college. The Academy became operational in 2015. The Academy was the first post-secondary institution in Fiji to be ISO certified.

According to the Fiji Sun, the Academy's $3 million bridge simulator was the most advanced in the Pacific.

The Academy's diplomas are issued through Fiji National University. The Academy's programs allow students to qualify for credentials recognized by the International Maritime Organization.

The Fiji Navy provides students with two weeks of "boot camp", to help the students acquire discipline and "officer like qualities".
