= Nigel Healey =

British economist, now working on higher education policy and management

Nigel M Healey
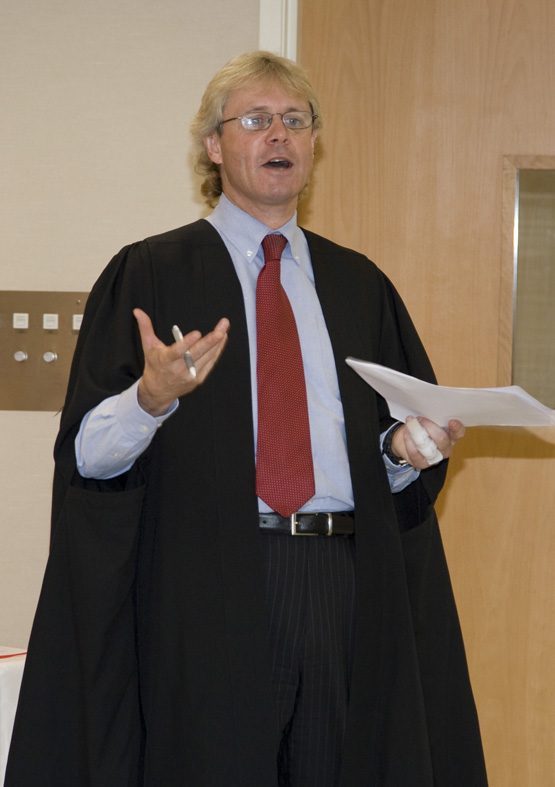
- Born: Royal Naval Hospital Haslar
- Occupation: Professor of International Higher Education
- Website: https://bath.academia.edu/NigelHealey

Nigel Healey is a British-New Zealand academic in management and higher education. His current research interests are in the internationalization of higher education, transnational education and higher education policy and management.

== Career ==
Dr Nigel Healey is an associate at the International Centre for Higher Education Management (ICHEM) at the University of Bath, where he teaches on the DBA Higher Education Management and supervises doctoral students. He was previously Professor of International Higher Education and Vice-President of Global and Community Engagement at the University of Limerick from April 2020 to October 2024. During his time at the University of Limerick, he served as Interim Provost and Deputy President during the COVID-19 pandemic from September 2020 to June 2022, returning to his substantive position in July 2022. Prior to his appointment at the University of Limerick in April 2020, Healey held senior academic positions at Fiji National University, Nottingham Trent University, the University of Canterbury and Manchester Metropolitan University, as well as teaching positions at the University of Leicester, Leeds Beckett University and the University of Northampton. He has been a visiting professor at Kent State University, South Dakota State University, University of Gdansk, University of Szczecin, Belarusian State University and Sichuan University.

Healey has served as an economic policy advisor to the prime minister of Belarus and the deputy minister of economy of the Russian Federation and managed a number of multinational research and economic development projects in different parts of the world. His current research interests are in the internationalisation of higher education, transnational education and higher education policy and management. Earlier in his career, he was the author and/or editor of a number of books on macroeconomic and monetary policy.

He is chair of the QS Global Advisory Committee which organises international higher education summits around the world each year, including the Middle-East and Africa (each March), Europe (each June), the Americas (each September) and the Asia-Pacific (each November). Until his retirement in October 2024, he was institutional coordinator of the EMERGE European University Alliance and a member of the advisory board of the European Reform University Alliance. Healey has previously served terms as a director of the Central Applications Office (CAO) in Ireland, governor of De Montfort University (Kazakhstan), a member of the Council of the Association of Commonwealth Universities (ACU), the board of trustees for the UK Council for International Student Affairs (UKCISA) and the Council of the Universities and Colleges Admissions Service (UCAS), a director of the Australia and New Zealand Academy of Management and the Chartered Association of Business Schools and a member of the National Management Committee for the Chartered Management Institute and Universities New Zealand Committee on International Policy.

He is a Fellow of the Chartered Management Institute and the New Zealand Institute of Management and Leadership and a Principal Fellow of the Higher Education Academy.

== Education ==
Healey holds a BA (1st Class Hons.) Economics from the University of Nottingham, an MA (Distinction) Economics from the University of Leeds, an MBA (Distinction) from the University of Warwick, a DBA in Higher Education Management from the University of Bath and a PhD in Management from Nottingham Trent University.

== Recent papers and reports ==
- Healey, N. (2026). International students’ experiences meeting English language requirements: A UKCISA research report on access, choice and preparedness in evidencing English language ability. https://www.ukcisa.org.uk/our-work/international-students-experiences-of-english-language-requirements/
- Healey, N. (2026). Reimagining university missions to respond to the Sustainable Development Goals. In Dabić, M., Pavičić, J., Stojčić, N. and Tuninga, R. (Eds.) University management: challenges, perspectives and strategies, Edward Elgar, 89-116. DOI: https://doi.org/10.4337/9781035342877.00014
- Healey, N. and Hickey, R. (2025). Managing transnational education partnerships: an evolving journey. In Hill, C. and Lamie, J. (Eds.) The insider’s guide to working in international higher education, Routledge. https://doi.org/10.4324/9781003649571-10.
- Healey, N. and Hickey, R. (2025). Understanding the mutating 'Third Wave': Comparing the drivers of remote metropolitan branch campuses and international branch campuses. Journal of Studies in International Education, DOI: https://doi.org/10.1177/10283153251356217
- Hickey, R. and Healey, N. (2024). The rise of the remote metropolitan branch campus – definitions, motivations and models. Higher Education Quarterly, DOI: https://doi.org/10.1111/hequ.12522
- Healey, N., Hunter, F. and Lewis, V. (2023). Universities' international engagement: time for an ethical overhaul? Bath Business and Society.
- Healey, N. (2023). Reinventing international higher education for a socially just, sustainable world. Perspectives: Policy and Practice in Higher Education. https://doi.org/10.1080/13603108.2023.2217780
- Ilieva, J., Healey, N., Tsiligiris, V., Ziguras, C., Killingley, P. and Lawton, W. (2022). The value of transnational education partnerships. British Council.
- Healey, N. (2022). What determines the success of an international branch campus? THE Campus, 10 August.
- Covington, R., Healey, N., Jones, A. and Trifiro, F. (2022). Indonesia international branch campus feasibility study and overview of TNE across ASEAN. Foreign Commonwealth and Development Office.
- Healey, N. (2022). The challenges of building a national university in a Pacific Island Country: lessons from the first ten years of Fiji National University. Journal of Higher Education Policy and Management, http://dx.doi.org/10.1080/1360080X.2022.2041255
- Healey, N. (2021). Transnational education: the importance of aligning stakeholders’ motivations with the form of cross-border educational service delivery. Higher Education Quarterly, https://doi.org/10.1111/hequ.12371
- Healey, N. (2019). The end of transnational education? The view from the UK. Perspectives: Policy and Practice in Higher Education, DOI: https://doi.org/10.1080/13603108.2019.1631227
- Healey, N. (2018). The challenges of managing transnational education partnerships: the views of “home-based” managers vs “in-country” managers, International Journal of Educational Management, 32(2), 241–256.
- Healey, N. (2018). The optimal global integration – local responsiveness trade-off for an international branch campus. Research in Higher Education, 59(5), 623–649.
- Healey, N. (2017). Transnational education and domestic higher education in Asian-Pacific host countries. Pacific-Asian Education, 29, 57–74.
- Healey, N. (2017). Beyond “export education”: aspiring to put students at the heart of a university’s internationalisation strategy. Perspectives: Policy and Practice in Higher Education, 21(4), 119–128.
- Healey, N. (2017). Reflections on the value of insider research as a qualitative research methodology. SAGE Research Methods Cases Part 2, DOI: https://dx.doi.org/10.4135/9781526401489
- Healey, N. (2015), Managing international branch campuses: what do we know?, Higher Education Quarterly, 69(4), 386–409.
- Healey, N. (2015), The challenges of leading an international branch campus: the ‘lived experience’ of in-country senior managers, Journal of Studies in International Education, 20(1), 61–78.
- Healey, N. (2014) When is an international branch campus?, International Higher Education, 78, 22–23
- Healey, N. and Bordogna, C. (2014), From transnational to multinational education: emerging trends in international higher education. Internationalisation of Higher Education, 3, 34–56
- Healey, N. and Michael, L. (2014), Towards a new framework for analysing transnational education, Higher Education Policy, 28(3), 369–391.
- Healey, N. (2014), Towards a risk-based typology for transnational education, Higher Education, 69(1), 1–18.
- Healey, N. (2013), Is UK transnational education “one of Britain’s great growth industries of the future”?, Higher Education Review, 45(3), 6–35
- Healey, N. (2013), Why do English universities really franchise degrees to overseas providers?, Higher Education Quarterly, 67(2), 180–200
- Healey, N. and Gunby, P. (2012), The impact of recent government tertiary education policies on access to higher education in New Zealand, Journal of Education Leadership, Policy and Policy, 27(1), 29–45
- Gunby, P. and Healey, N. (2012), New Zealand, in The impact of economic crisis on higher education, UNESCO, 87–100
- Healey, N. (2011), The 2010 and 2011 Canterbury Earthquakes and organisational learning at the University of Canterbury: does practice make perfect?, Journal of Management and Organization, 17(6), 850–856
- Healey, N. (2008), Is higher education in really internationalising?, Higher Education, 55 (3), 333–355
