= Claverton Down =

Suburb of Bath, Somerset, England

Coordinates: 51.375°N 2.324°W

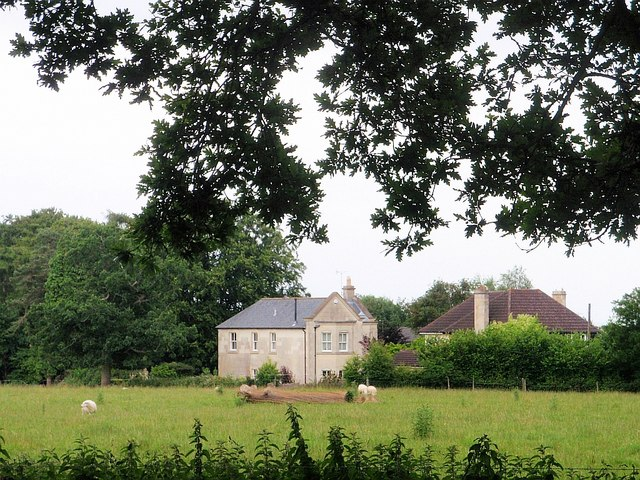
Claverton Down from the Bath Skyline trail

Claverton Down is a suburb on the south-east hilltop edge of Bath, Somerset, England. It is linked to the Bathwick area of the city by Bathwick Hill.

Primarily a rural area with relatively few houses, it is home to the University of Bath, the headquarters of Wessex Water and a private golf course, the Bath Golf Course.

The American Museum is based at Claverton Manor, below Claverton Down on the road to the village of Claverton. Claverton Manor was designed by Jeffry Wyattville and built in the 1820s, and is a Grade I listed building.

Claverton Down was the location of an isolation hospital, constructed in 1876. It consisted of a number of temporary wooden ward blocks and two "fever tents". Permanent buildings were erected in 1931–34. In 1950, at the age of 13, food writer and cook Mary Berry contracted polio and spent three months at the hospital.
