= University Radio Bath =

Student radio station at the University of Bath, England

Coordinates: 51°22.6′N 2°19.55′W

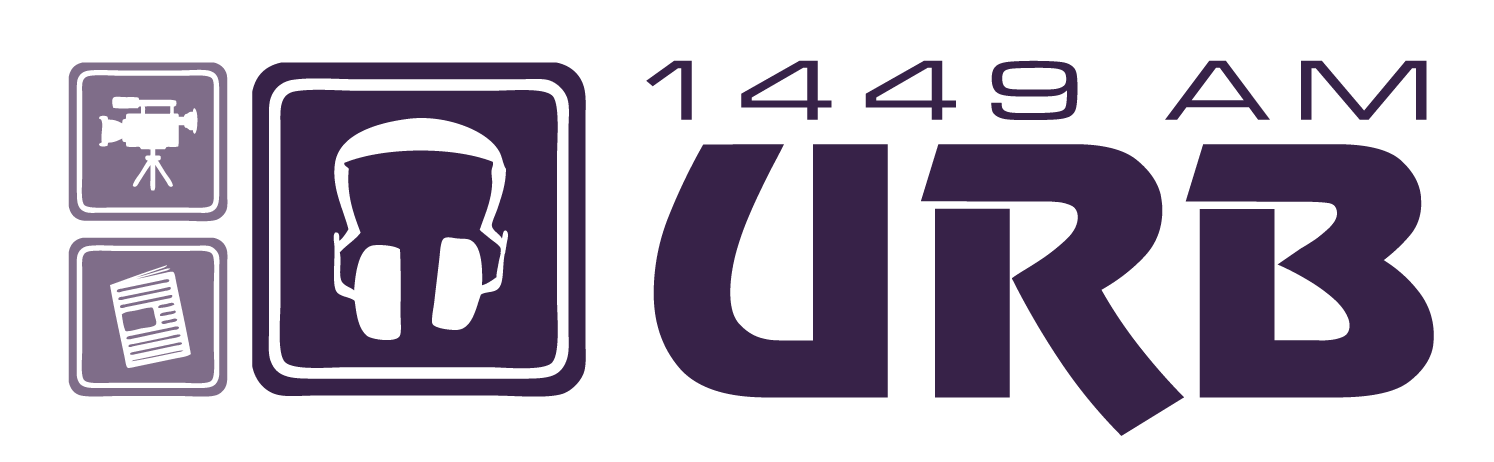
- Bath, Somerset; United Kingdom
- Broadcast area: Online (URB Online)

Programming
- Language: English
- Format: Contemporary Student

Ownership
- Owner: University of Bath Students' Union

History
- Founded: 1973
- First air date: 16 May 1973
- Former frequencies: 1449 kHz, 963 kHz

Links
- Webcast: Listen Live
- Website: URB Online

University Radio Bath or URB is the student-run radio station from the University of Bath, England.

== About ==
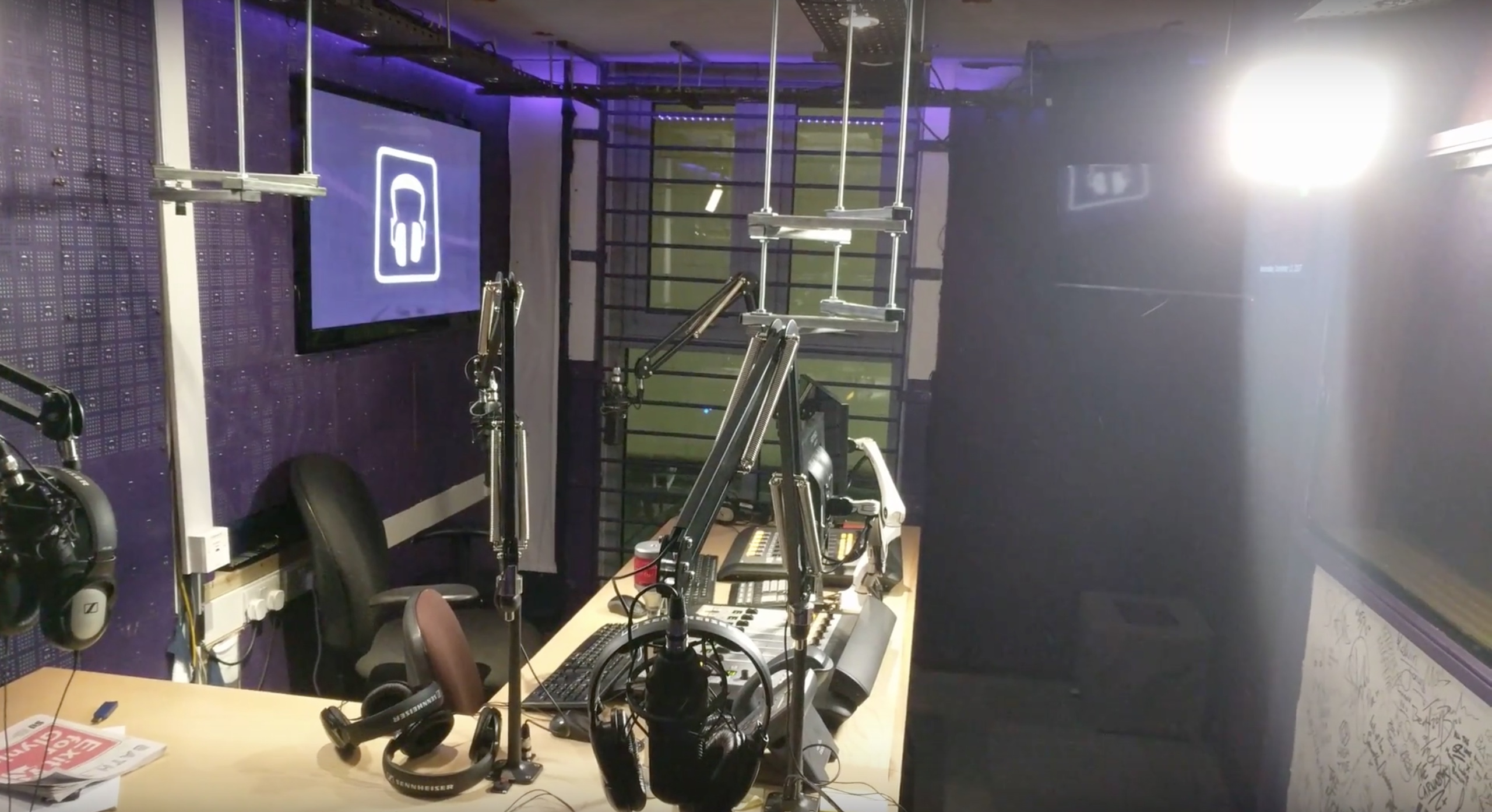
Inside Studio 1 at the University Radio Bath studios.

University Radio Bath is run entirely by volunteers, all students studying at the University of Bath. The station broadcasts 24 hours a day throughout the year, although live broadcasts tend to only be during semester time. The schedule is made up of a variety of shows including entertainment, news, speech, drama and specialist music. With a new intake of students each academic year, the station's output can change significantly.

== History ==
URB 963, launched on 16 May 1973.

Neil Fox - better known as Dr Fox - and Richard Evans of Radio 1 Newsbeat both started their careers at URB.

In 1987, three URB presenters (Graham Hukins, Ben Ramsden & Andrew Wiseman) broadcast a special 24-hour show, raising money for local charities.

In September 2014 the radio station was renamed University Radio Bath.

In 2018, the station broadcast a special 45 hour show, in celebration of URB's 45th anniversary. The marathon show raised money for Teenage Cancer Trust.

== Recent history ==
In March 2008, presenters broadcast 60 hours of continuous live shows to raise money for the charity Hearing Aid and the station hosted the National Student Radio Conference on behalf of the Student Radio Association the conference between 17 and 19 March featured talks from a variety of speakers from the world of radio including BBC Radio 1's Greg James.

In 2013, URB celebrated its 40th anniversary. To mark the occasion, the current committee, in association with the University of Bath Alumni Office and the Students' Union organised a reunion event for 2 February 2013 with many alumni reviving their old shows.

In March 2014, BBC Radio 1's Scott Mills presented the Student Radio Chart Show live from URB with Jamie Lee and Bev Lung as a prize provided by Radio 1 for the station winning Best Student Radio Chart Show at the Student Radio Chart Show 2013.

In May 2014, URB won their first Radio Academy Awards for Best Technical Innovation at the 2014 Awards. The station won bronze for Head of Online, Jonty Usborne's Responsive Radio and Unified Station Management Application.

In April 2018, URB hosted the URB Big Weekend to celebrate their 45th year of being on air, while raising money for Teenage Cancer Trust. The studios broadcast live for a full 45 hours from 4pm on the 13th of April 2018, hosting chat shows, music, interviews, games, and a prize draw. The full show was also broadcast live on Twitch, with video cameras capturing the stream. A total of £2,415 was raised for charity.

In November 2018, URB once again won gold at the Student Radio Awards, when Mitch Thorngate won in the Best Newcomer category

In December 2023, URB broadcast a 50-hour show celebrating their 50 year anniversary, fundraising for Open Up Music, a Bristol based charity that work to open up music opportunities for young disabled people. URB raised a total of £1,146.25, surpassing their £1,050.50 goal. Three hosts (Toby Gilday, Atish Sisodia and Thaddeus Allison) hosted 25 continuous hours of the show.

== Studios ==
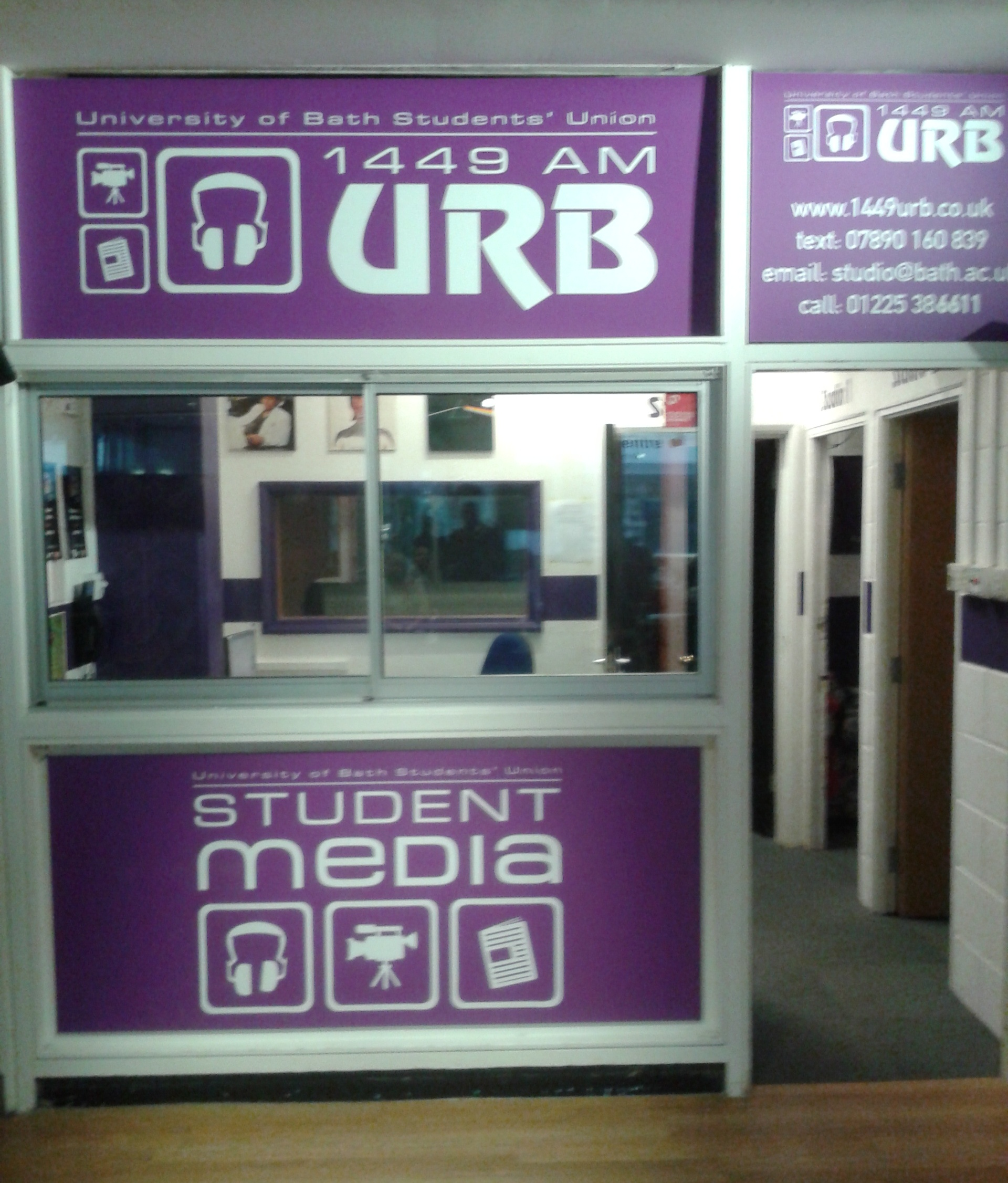
The URB Studio - Norwood House, University of Bath

URB has a set of 3 studios in the heart of the newly built Student Centre and an office; Studio 1 - the main broadcast studio, Studio 2 - a DJ studio/radio-with-pictures suite, and finally Studio 3 - a production studio and news room.

The station broadcasts live shows from throughout the day and into the night, with shows ranging from daytime entertainment shows to specialist music. When there's not a live presenter in the studio, an interactive "non-stop" system fills in the gaps. URB previously informed the campus with hourly news bulletins from the Sky News Centre.

== Notable shows ==
A number of shows broadcast on a regular schedule, including:

- 1 - The Weekend Warm Up Warm Up
- 2 - Morning Glory
- 3 - Afternoon Delight
- 4 - The Politics Show
- 5 - The U-List
- 6 - Vinyl Year Project
- 7 - Album Hour
- 8 - Astral Plane
- 9 - Radio Chévere, a Spanish-language radio programme
- 10 - Proper Gander
- 11 - The Dig
- 12 - A Game of Two Halves
- 13 - Indie Takeaway

== Neighbours ==
URB has sister stations at other universities in the area:

- Burst Radio – University of Bristol
- Xpress Radio – Cardiff University
