= Fiji National University =

Public university in Fiji

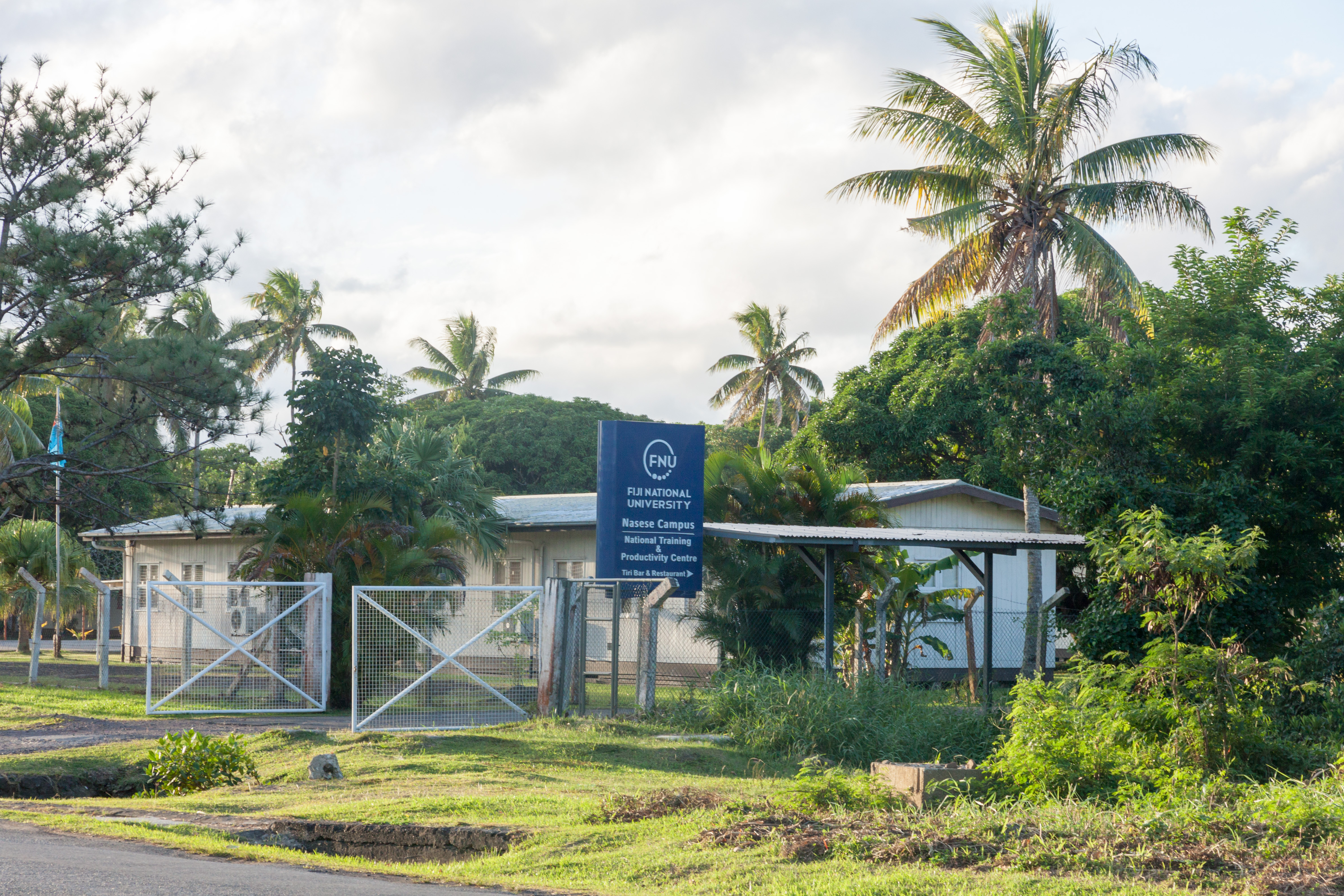
- Type: Public University
- Established: 1885; 141 years ago, 2010; 16 years ago
- Chancellor: Semesa Karavaki
- Vice-Chancellor: Professor Unaisi Nabobo Baba
- Students: 26,000+
- Location: Fiji; 18.1416°S 178.4419°E
- Campus: Ba Campus, Hoodless House Campus, Koronivia Campus, Labasa Campus, Laucala Bay Campus, Lautoka Campus, Nabua Campus, Nadi Campus, Narere Campus, Nasese Campus, Nasinu Campus, Pasifika Campus, Samabula Campus, Tamavua Campus
- Website: www.fnu.ac.fj

Fiji National University is a public university in Fiji that was formally constituted on 15 February 2010 under the Fiji National University Act 2009.

By 2019, student numbers at the University had grown to almost 70,000. While each of the colleges has its own campus, the University also has two out-reach campuses in Ba and Labasa, which offer a range of programmes from different colleges, supported by distance learning, to broaden access to higher education across the country. In addition, the National Training and Productivity Centre has a national network of smaller training campuses in Suva, Nadi and Lautoka.

== Structure and facilities ==
In addition to the six founding colleges, the Training and Productivity Authority of Fiji (est. 1973) also became part of the new University. Following the creation of the University, the organisation structure was rationalised into five colleges, one national centre and one pacific centre:

1. College of Agriculture, Fisheries and Forestry
2. College of Business, Hospitality and Tourism Studies
3. College of Engineering & Technical Vocational Education and Training
4. College of Humanities, Education and Law
5. College of Medicine, Nursing and Health Sciences
6. National Training and Productivity Centre.
7. Pacific Centre for Maritime Studies

Although it was formally established in 2010, Fiji National University has a long history of relevant education dating back to the origins of its component Colleges, through institutions that were established according to national needs and aspirations as these developed.

The University is part of Australia's Academic and Research Network (AARNet), the company that provide internet services to the Australian education and research communities and their research partners. This has allowed the University to have superfast broadband in partnership with DigitalFIJI. Books and journals have been replaced by digital collections and libraries have been transformed into modern “social learning commons” where students can work alone or in groups, accessing a wealth of learning materials virtually.

The University has also invested, with financial support from the Fiji Government, in upgrading its facilities and constructing new buildings. A new “green field” campus in Labasa was scheduled to have opened in 2020, but has been delayed by the termination of construction company's contract, compounded by the Covid-19 pandemic. A new gymnasium complex, four-storey business school at the Nasinu Campus and a new three-storey teaching building at Fiji Maritime Academy have been completed. A major programme of renovations saw most of the University's halls of residences and catering facilities upgraded.

== Academic leadership ==
The first Vice Chancellor, Dr Ganesh Chand, served from the foundation of the University in 2010 until 2014. He was later the Vice Chancellor of Solomon Islands University from 2019-22. The second Vice Chancellor was Professor Nigel Healey, a British-New Zealand economist who served a four-year term between 2016 and 2020. He left FNU at the end of his term to become Provost and Deputy President of the University of Limerick in Ireland. His successor was Professor Toby Wilkinson, a renowned British Egyptologist. Professor Wilkinson served for 15 months until March 2022, before returning to the University of Cambridge for family reasons. Professor Wilkinson is now the Fellow for Development at Clare College. Professor Lyn Karstadt, formerly Deputy Vice Chancellor of Murdoch University in Western Australia, served for one year until February 2023, before Professor Unaisi Nabobo-Baba assumed the position.

== Component Colleges ==
The Fiji National University comprises 5 colleges and 2 centres spread throughout 15 campuses across the country. The university also has 15 libraries around Fiji. The main administration centre of Fiji National University, including the hub of its extensive teacher training faculty, is located at what was once Fiji's prestigious Queen Victoria School (known as "Vuli-Ni-Tu"), established at Nasinu in 1907.

The College of Medicine, Nursing & Health Sciences contains the Fiji School of Medicine and the Fiji School of Nursing. The merger of the Fiji School of Medicine and the Fiji School of Nursing into the Fiji National University saw the creation of five schools under the College of Medicine, Nursing and Health Sciences: the School of Health Sciences; the School of Oral Health; the School of Medical Sciences; the School of Public Health and Primary Care and School of Nursing. It includes the new Pasifika Campus opposite the Colonial War Memorial Hospital. The former Medical School was originally established in 1885 as the Suva Medical School to train vaccinators. It now provides training in most health science disciplines including medicine, dentistry, pharmacy, physiotherapy, radiography, laboratory technology, public health, health services management, dietetics and environmental health. The former Fiji School of Nursing was one of the oldest nursing education institutions in the Pacific and was founded in 1893. It offers basic and post-basic nursing programmes for Fiji and regional students. Graduates are capable of working in general health services, maternal and child health care service, mental health service, and, in urban, rural and remote community health services.

The College of Business, Hospitality & Tourism Studies has business degree programmes which are nationally accredited. The College's programmes are all vetted by the relevant Industry Advisory Committees before being approved by the University's Senate. Accreditation for some programmes such as Accounting is also provided by the professional body, the Fiji Institute of Accountants. Currently FNU has programmes in two streams, the Technical & Vocational Education Training Stream and the Higher Education Stream. With the aim to take education closer to the community, FNU programmes particularly in Accounting, Economics, Computing Science and others, are all offered via 5 campuses around Fiji including Nadi, Lautoka, Ba and Labasa. FNU is currently rolling out postgraduate programmes on a number of commerce subjects.

The College of Engineering & Technical Vocational Education and Training offers a variety of academic programmes of study, with the Samabula Campus hosting most of the programs. The former Fiji Institute of Technology (FIT) is now part of the FNU College of Engineering & Technical Vocational Education and Training and is the University's Samabula Campus. It was originally established in 1963 to train students in technical and vocational disciplines, to meet the engineering human resource needs of Fiji. The College provides education to cater for the total human resource needs of Fiji and the South Pacific in the areas of engineering, technology, including information technology and electronics, marine training and in the sciences. The then FIT was also a starting point for the College of Business, Hospitality and Tourism Studies, which is now also located in a number of different centres, including the new Nadi Campus in the heart of Fiji's tourism industry.

The College of Humanities, Education and Law contains the School of Social Sciences, and the School of Education. The Humanities Department of this College, including its widely known music section, is based on the Raiwai Campus (UniStudio) in Suva. Teacher training was located to relocated to Matavatucou, Tailevu Province, in 1947. The facilities were used to establish the Nasinu Teachers College, a primary teacher training institution. The Lautoka Teachers College was established in 1978 as the country's largest pre-service provider of primary teachers and later, secondary school teachers. It is on the FNU Lautoka Campus with some of the programs also being offered in Suva, Nasinu Campus. In 1982, it underwent some changes and re-opened as the Nasinu Residential College for students. In the 1990s, an Australian aid programme helped establish training for secondary teachers and in 1992 the Fiji College of Advanced Education opened at the Nasinu site. After the merger in 2010, the School of Education modified its teacher training curriculum.

The College of Agriculture, Fisheries & Forestry is connected to a number of other public and private national institutions with whom it collaborates in training, research and community service. Currently all CAFF programs are offered at the Koronivia Campus, in Koronivia, Nausori. The former Fiji College of Agriculture was established in 1954 to meet the human resource needs of the country in all areas of agriculture. That College was further developed into the University's College of Agriculture, Fisheries and Forestry on the Koronivia Campus. It places great emphasis on research.

The National Training and Productivity Centre (NTPC), formerly known as the Training and Productivity Authority of Fiji (TPAF) and the Fiji National Training Council, was established in 1973 by the Fiji National Training Act. It established the National Qualifications Framework to benchmark training and qualifications in technical and trade areas against a national standard, based on the needs of local industries, and is comparable with overseas qualifications. TPAF became part of FNU in 2011 as the NTPC to run the University's short courses in areas ranging from senior executive level management and leadership to innovative technical courses specifically designed for local conditions.

== Notable alumni ==
- Jasa Veremalua (born 1988), rugby union player for the Tel Aviv Heat
