= Urb (surname) =

Family name

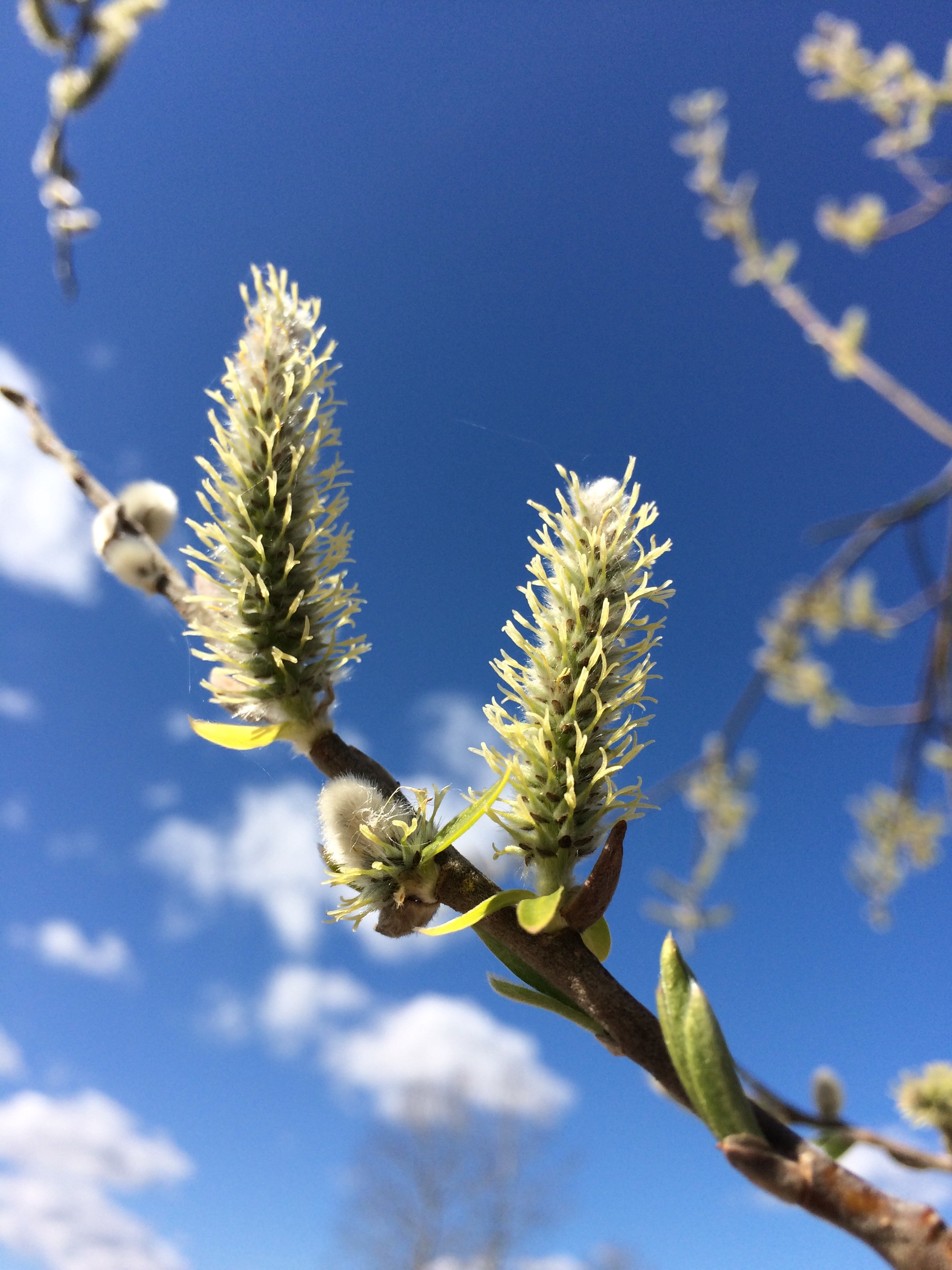

Origin
- Language: Estonian
- Meaning: catkin
- Region of origin: Estonia

Urb is an Estonian surname meaning "catkin". As of 1 January 2021, 186 men and 199 women in Estonia have the surname Urb. Urb is ranked as the 332nd most common surname for men in Estonia, and 346th for women. The surname Urb is most common in Võru County, where 13.48 per 10,000 inhabitants of the county bear the surname.

Notable people bearing the surname Urb include:

- Johann Urb (born 1977), Estonian-American actor, film producer and model
- Kaia Urb (born 1956), Estonian singer
- Silvia Urb (1924–2018), Estonian singer
- Tarmo Urb (born 1952), Estonian singer-songwriter and actor
- Tom-Olaf Urb (also known as Reket; born 1985), Estonian musician, producer, writer and actor
- Toomas Urb (born 1958), Estonian actor and singer
