= Jonty Usborne =

British producer and broadcast engineer at BBC News

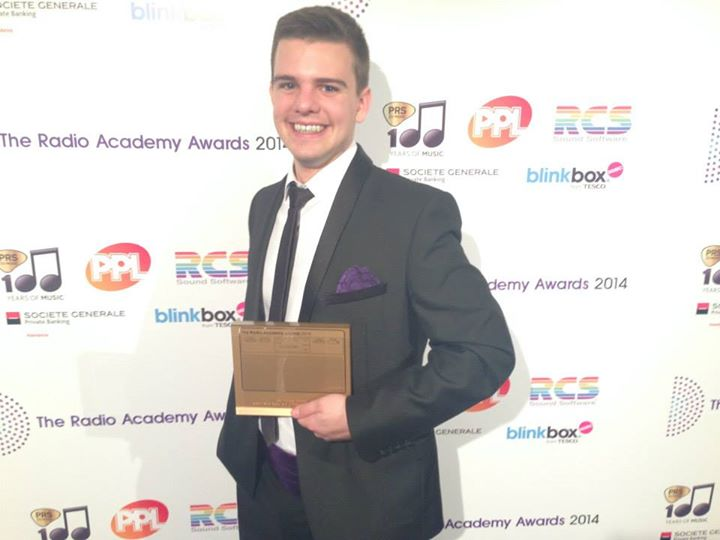
- Usborne at the 2013 Radio Academy Awards
- Born: Jonathan Usborne; 17 July 1990 (age 36); Brussels, Belgium
- Education: Haileybury & Imperial Service College; University of Bath
- Engineering career
- Discipline: Broadcast engineering; Software engineering
- Employers: BBC; Radio Academy; Student Radio Association; The Independent; YouTube
- Projects: UK Radioplayer Console; Unified Station Management; Responsive Radio
- Awards: 2013 Student Radio Award for Best Technical Achievement; 2014 Radio Academy Award for Best Technical Innovation; 2014 Student Radio Award for Best Technical Achievement; 2015 Student Radio Award for Best Technical Achievement

Jonathan "Jonty" Usborne (born 17 July 1990) is a product manager at YouTube, a former producer and broadcast engineer at BBC News, and a former writer for The Independent. He is noted for having won awards such as the Student Radio Award for Best Technical Achievement and the Radio Academy Award for Best Technical Innovation, making him the first university student to win in a technical category at the Radio Academy Awards. Usborne sat on the trustee board of the Radio Academy from 2015 to 2019, and, as of 2023, he is head of product design at YouTube.

== Life and career ==
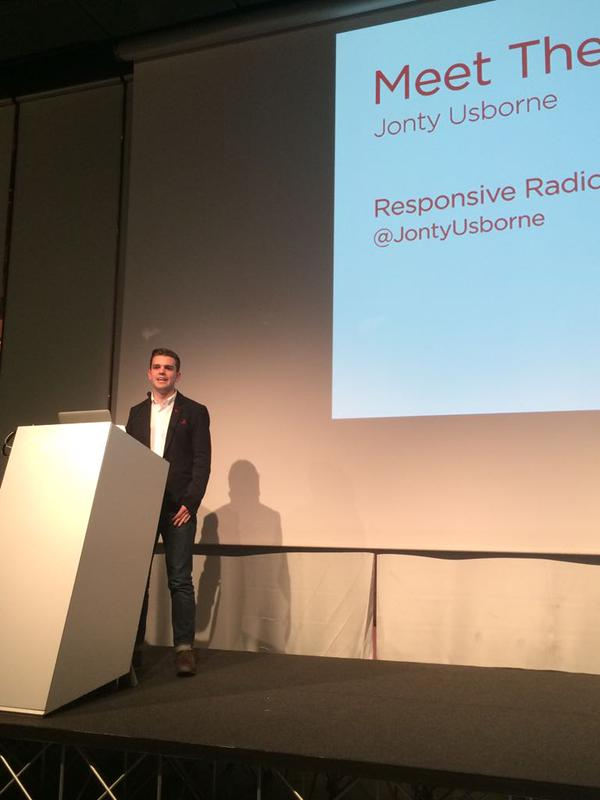
Usborne speaking at the 2015 Radiodays Europe conference in Milan

Born in Brussels, raised in Old Greenwich, Connecticut, and educated at Haileybury & Imperial Service College, Usborne became involved in student radio in 2009, after commencing studying economics at the University of Bath. After being elected in 2011 to the position of head of online media at University Radio Bath—the university's student radio station—he developed FRANCESCA, a station management system and console for the UK's Radioplayer application. Usborne submitted his system for consideration in the Best Technical Innovation category at the 2013 Student Radio Awards, and was awarded gold that November. The judges described his application as "a real innovation".

The following year, Usborne developed Responsive Radio, a "new approach to broadcasting", which incorporated ReQuester, an application he had developed that provided feedback to radio presenters about the musical preferences of their listeners. He submitted Responsive Radio with the United Station Management application for consideration in the 2014 Radio Academy Awards. In May that year, Usborne became the first university student to win in a technical category at the Radio Academy Awards, when he received bronze in the Best Technical Innovation category, beating out competition from both Global Radio and the BBC. The judges described the entry as "a great example of technical innovation creating listener benefit", and said that it was "particularly impressive" that it had been created by "a student station with presumably little resource". Responsive Radio and Unified Station Management were also nominated for the Arqiva TechCon Technical Excellence Award in September 2014. In November, Usborne won gold for Responsive Radio in the Best Technical Achievement category at the 2014 Student Radio Awards.

In April 2014, Usborne was elected to the positions of station manager of University Radio Bath and deputy events officer of the Student Radio Association; the following month, he set up and ran the first fully-visualised edition of the Student Radio Chart Show. In October, Usborne was named as one of the Radio Academy's "30 Under 30" of the year. In March 2015, he spoke at that year's Radiodays Europe conference in Milan on the future of radio, and in May was elected to the position of chair of the Student Radio Association. In July he was elected to the trustee board of the Radio Academy, and in November was awarded gold for Best Technical Achievement for a third time at the 2015 Student Radio Awards.

After graduating from Bath in June 2016, Usborne joined the media playout department at the BBC as a graduate software engineer, and began developing their online web media player. During 2017, he worked to integrate Audiogram Generator—a speech-to-text tool designed by the New York radio station WNYC—into the BBC's social media platforms to subtitle autoplaying short-form videos. The following year, Usborne joined YouTube as a partner technology manager, before being promoted to product manager in 2021 and then to head of product design in 2023. He stepped down from the trustee board of the Radio Academy in early 2019. In September 2023, Usborne went viral on Twitter when he posted a screenshot of a message that he had received on the gay social networking service Grindr that inquired about his career as a product manager at Google. Amused, Usborne captioned the image: "LinkedIn is so 2022". As of 2026, the post has been viewed more than 1.9 million times, and received over 37 thousand likes and 2.6 thousand retweets.

== Awards and accolades ==
Year	Award	Category	Details	Result	Ref.
2013	Student Radio Awards	Best Technical Achievement	UK Radioplayer Console and Unified Station Management Application	Gold	
2014	Radio Academy Awards	Best Technical Innovation	Responsive Radio and Unified Station Management	Bronze	
2014	Radio Academy Awards	30 Under 30	—	Won	
2014	Arqiva TechCon Awards	Technical Excellence	Responsive Radio and Unified Station Management	Shortlisted	
2014	Student Radio Awards	Best Technical Achievement	Responsive Radio	Gold	
2015	Student Radio Awards	Best Technical Achievement	Visualisation Rebuild and URB Digital	Gold	
2015	Student Radio Awards	The Kevin Greening Creativity Award	Visualisation Rebuild and URB Digital	Shortlisted	
