= Isotope effect =

Isotope effect may refer to:

- Equilibrium isotope effect, see Equilibrium constant#Effect of isotopic substitution
- Isotopic shift, effect of isotopic substitution on spectroscopy
- Kinetic isotope effect, effect of isotopic substitution on chemical reaction rates
- Magnetic isotope effect, when a chemical reaction involves spin-selective processes, such as the radical pair mechanism
- Superconductive transition temperature varying by isotope atomic weight: see BCS theory#Underlying evidence
