= List of writers by name: G =

The following is a List of writers by name whose last names begin with G:

Abbreviations: ch = children's; d = drama, screenwriting; f = fiction; nf = non-fiction; p = poetry, song lyrics

== Ga–Gb ==
- Jostein Gaarder (born 1952, Norway, f/ch)
- Gaariye (1949–2012, Somaliland/Norway, p)
- Diana Gabaldon (born 1952, US, f)
- Ekaterine Gabashvili (1851–1938, Russian E/USSR, nf)
- Émile Gaboriau (1832–1873, France, f/nf)
- Pierre Gabriel (1933–2015, France/Switzerland, nf)
- Vladimir Gaćinović (1890–1917, Austria-Hungary/Switzerland, nf)
- Carlo Emilio Gadda (1893–1973, Italy, f/nf)
- Muammar Gaddafi (c. 1942–2011, Libya, nf)
- William Gaddis (1922–1998, US, f/nf)
- Moawad GadElrab (1929–1983, Egypt, nf/d)
- Patricia Gaffney (born 1944, US, f)
- Simon Henry Gage (1851–1944, US, nf)
- Thomas Gage (c. 1603–1636, England, nf)
- Eva Roe Gaggin (1879–1966, US, ch)
- Paulin Gagne (1808–1876, France, p/nf)
- Arkady Gaidar (1904–1941, Russian E/USSR, ch/f)
- Christian Gailly (1943–2013, France, f)
- Neil Gaiman (born 1960, England, f/nf/d)
- Geoffrey Gaimar (fl. 1130s, England, nf/p)
- Abby Gaines (living, N Zealand, f)
- Serge Gainsbourg (1928–1991, France, p/nf)
- Tadeusz Gajcy (1922–1944, Poland, p)
- Arthur Gakwandi (born 1943, Uganda, f)
- Antonio Gala (1930–2023, Spain, p/d/f)
- Gala Galaction (1879–1961, Romania, nf/f), pseudonym of Grigorie Pișculescu
- Taw Phaya Galay (1926–2006, Burma/Myanmar, nf)
- Konstanty Ildefons Gałczyński (1905–1953, Poland, p/d)
- Benito Pérez Galdós (1843–1920, Spain, f/nf)
- Norman Gale (1862–1942, England, poet)
- Thomas Gale (1635/1636–1702, England, nf)
- Eduardo Galeano (1940–2015, Uruguay, f/nf)
- Winifred Gales (1761–1839, England/US, f/nf)
- Dumitru Găleșanu (born 1955, Romanian, p)
- Erzsébet Galgóczi (1930–1989, Hungary, f/d)
- Damon Galgut (born 1963, S Africa, d/f)
- Augièr Galhard (fl. 16th c., France, p)
- Lada Galina (1934–2015, Bulgaria, nf/d), pseudonym of Ganka Slavova Karanfilova
- Katherine Gallagher (born 1935, Australia/England, p)
- Fatima Gallaire (1944–2020, Algeria/France, d/f)
- Maggie Gallagher (born 1960, US, nf)
- Rhian Gallagher (born 1961, N Zealand, p)
- Rómulo Gallegos (1884–1969, Venezuela, f)
- Paul Gallico (1897–1976, US, f/nf)
- Menna Gallie (1919–1990, Wales, f)
- Raymond Z. Gallun (1911–1994, US, f)
- Daniel F. Galouye (1920–1976, US, f)
- John Galsworthy (1867–1933, England, f/d)
- John Galt (1779–1839, Scotland, f/nf)
- Douglas Galton (1822–1899, England, nf)
- Francis Galton (1822–1911, England, nf)
- Karina Galvez (born 1964, Ecuador/US, p/ch)
- Manuel Gálvez (1882–1962, Argentina, f/p/nf)
- James Galvin (born 1951, US, p/f)
- Basílio da Gama (1740–1795, Brazil, p)
- Joana da Gama (c. 1520–1586, Portugal, nf)
- Eric Gamalinda (born 1956, Philippines, p/f/d)
- Pierre Gamarra (1919–2009, France, p/f/nf)
- Griselda Gambaro (born 1928, Argentina, f/d/ch)
- Gamli gnævaðarskáld (fl. c. 10th c., Iceland, p)
- Konstantine Gamsakhurdia (1893–1975, Russian E/USSR, f)
- Zviad Gamsakhurdia (1939–1993, USSR/Georgia, nf/p)
- Gan De (甘德, 4th c. BCE, China, nf)
- Mahatma Gandhi (1869–1948, India, nf), born Mohandas Karamchand Gandhi
- Anita Ganeri (born 1961, India/England, ch)
- Ludwig Ganghofer (1855–1920, Germany, f)
- Sunil Gangopadhyay (1934–2012, India, p/nf/f)
- Nizami Ganjavi (c. 1141–1209, Seljuk E, p)
- Ernest K. Gann (1910–1991, US, f/nf)
- Jack Gantos (born 1951, US, ch)
- Gao Lian (高濂, fl. 16th c., China, d/nf)
- Gao Xingjian (高行健, born 1940, China/France, f/d/nf)
- Gao Yu (高瑜, born 1944, China, nf)
- Petina Gappah (born 1971, Zambia/Zimbabwe, f)
- Ilija Garašanin (1812–1874, Ottoman E/Serbia, nf)
- János Garay (1812–1853, Hungary, p/d/f)
- Arne Garborg (1851–1924, Norway, f/nf)
- Gabriel Cevallos García (1913–2004, Ecuador, nf)
- Roger Martin du Gard (1881–1958, France, f)
- Jane Gardam (1928–2025, England, f/ch)
- Jesús Gardea (1939–2000, Mexico, f)
- Jonas Gardell (born 1963, Sweden, f/d)
- Alexander Garden (c. 1585 – c. 1642, Scotland, p), also cited as Gardyne
- Delphine Gardey (born 1967, France, nf)
- Samuel Rawson Gardiner (1829–1902, England, nf)
- Stephen Gardiner (1924–2007, England, f/nf)
- Elizabeth Anne Gard'ner (1858–1926, N Zealand, nf)
- Frank Gardner (born 1961, England, nf/f)
- Gerald Gardner (1884–1964, England, nf)
- Helen Gardner (1908–1986, England, nf)
- James Alan Gardner (born 1955, Canada, f/nf)
- John Gardner (1926–2007, f)
- Sally Gardner (living, England, ch)
- Géza Gárdonyi (1863–1922, Hungary, f/nf)
- Jacques Garelli (1931–2014, France, p/nf)
- Leon Garfield (1921–1996, England, f/ch)
- Simon Garfield (born 1960, England, nf)
- Gunnar Emil Garfors (1900–1979, Norway, p)
- Anu Garg (born 1967, India/US, nf)
- Ricardo Garibay (1923–1999, Mexico, nf/d/f)
- Doris Pilkington Garimara (1937–2014, Australia, nf/ch)
- Robert Garioch (1909–1981, Scotland, p)
- Howard R. Garis (1873–1962), US, ch)
- Alex Garland (born 1970, England, f/d)
- Hamlin Garland (1860–1940, US, f/p/nf)
- Raymond Garlick (1926–2011, England/Wales, p)
- Dorothy Garlock (1919–2018, US, f)
- Salvador Garmendia (1928–2001, Venezuela, f/nf/ch)
- Hector de Saint-Denys Garneau (1912–1943, France, p)
- Alan Garner (born 1934, England, f/ch)
- Helen Garner (born 1942, Australia, f/d)
- William Garner (1920–2005, England, f)
- Constance Garnett (1861–1946, England, f)
- David Garnett (1892–1981, England/France, f/nf)
- Edward Garnett (1868–1937, England, nf)
- Eve Garnett (1900–1991, England, ch)
- Richard Garnett (1789–1850, England, nf)
- Richard Garnett (1835–1906, England, nf/p)
- Robert Garnier (1554–1590, France, p/d)
- Almeida Garrett (1799–1854, Portugal, p/d/f), full name João Baptista da Silva Leitão de Almeida Garrett, 1st Viscount of Almeida Garrett
- Randall Garrett (1927–1987, US, f)
- David Garrick (1717–1779, England, d)
- Jean Garrigue (1912–1972, US, p)
- Elena Garro (1916–1998, Mexico, d/nf/f)
- Samuel Garth (1661–1719, England, nf/p)
- Rosie Garthwaite (born 1980, England, nf)
- Charles Garvice (1850–1920, England, f)
- Julie Garwood (born 1944, US, f/ch)
- Romain Gary (1914–1980, Russian E/France, f), pseudonym of Roman Kacew
- George Gascoigne (c. 1535–1577, England, p/f/d)
- David Gascoyne (1916–2001, England/France, p)
- Norman Gash (1912–2009, England, nf)
- Elizabeth Gaskell (1810–1865, England, f/nf)
- Jane Gaskell (born 1941, England, f)
- Catherine Gaskin (1929–2009, Ireland/Australia, f)
- Valérie de Gasparin (1813–1894, Switzerland, nf)
- Thomas Gaspey (1788–1871, England, f/nf)
- Francis Aidan Gasquet (1846–1929, England, nf)
- Joachim Gasquet (1873–1921, France, nf)
- William H. Gass (1924–2017, US, f/nf)
- Nathalie Gassel (born 1964, Belgium, nf)
- Doris Gates (1901–1987, US, ch)
- Mugo Gatheru (1925–2011, Kenya, nf)
- Jonathan Gathorne-Hardy (1933–2019, England, nf/f/ch)
- Robert Gathorne-Hardy (1902–1973, England, nf)
- Shoji Gatoh (賀東招二, born 1971, Japan, f)
- Zélia Gattai (1916–2008, Brazil, nf/f/ch)
- Armand Gatti (1924–2017, Monaco/France, d/p)
- Alfred Gatty (1813–1903, England, nf)
- Margaret Gatty (1809–1873, England, ch/nf)
- John Taylor Gatto (1935–2018, US, nf)
- Laurent Gaudé (born 1972, France, d/f)
- John Gauden (died 1663, England, nf)
- William Gaunt (1900–1980, England, nf)
- David Gauthier (1932–2023, Canada/US, nf)
- Alejandrina Benítez de Gautier (1819–1879, Puerto Rico, p)
- Théophile Gautier (1811–1872, France, p/d/f)
- Jamila Gavin (born 1941, India/England, ch/f)
- John Gawsworth (1912–1970, England, f/p), pseudonym of Terence Ian Fytton Armstrong
- John Gay (1685–1732, England, p/d)
- John Gay (1699–1745, England, nf)
- Peter Gay (1923–2015, Germany/US, nf)
- William Gay (1865–1897, Scotland/Australia, p)
- Kaberi Gayen (born 1970, E Pakistan/Bangladesh, nf)
- Hazel Gaynor (born 1971, England/Ireland, f)
- Gaito Gazdanov (1903–1971, Russian E/France, f/nf)
- Nejc Gazvoda (born 1985, Yugoslavia/Slovenia, f/d)
- Béatrice Lalinon Gbado (born 1984, Benin, ch)

== Ge ==
- Ge Fei (格非, born 1964, China, f), pseudonym of Liu Yong (刘勇)
- Ge Hong (葛洪, 283–343 or 364, China, nf)
- António Gedeão (1906–1997, Portugal, p/nf/d), pseudonym of Rómulo de Carvalho
- Maggie Gee (born 1948, England, f)
- Maurice Gee (born 1931, N Zealand, f)
- Jef Geeraerts (1930–2015, Belgium, f/d)
- Yehonatan Geffen (born 1947, Palestine/Israel, p/nf/d)
- Emanuel Geibel (1815–1884, Germany, p/d)
- Arno Geiger (born 1968, Austria, f)
- Erik Gustaf Geijer (1783–1847, Sweden, nf/p)
- Glúmr Geirason (fl. 10th c., Iceland, p)
- Iztok Geister (born 1945, Yugoslavia/Slovenia, nf/p)
- Naira Gelashvili (born 1947, USSR/Georgia, f/nf/p)
- Christian Fürchtegott Gellert (1715–1769, Germany, p)
- Leon Gellert (1892–1977, Australia, p/f)
- Roberta Gellis (1927–2016, US, f)
- Juan Gelman (1930–2014, Argentina/Mexico, p/nf)
- Mirza Gelovani (1917–1944, USSR, p)
- Pam Gems (1925–2011, England, d)
- Wilhelm Genazino (1943–2018, Germany, f/nf/d)
- Jean Genet (1910–1986, France, f/d/nf)
- Anna Genover-Mas (born 1963, Spain, nf/ch)
- Jordán Bruno Genta (1909–1974, Argentina, nf)
- Doris Gentile (1894–1972, Australia, f)
- Sulari Gentill (living, Sri Lanka/Australia, f)
- Mary Gentle (born 1956, England, f), pseudonym Roxanne Morgan
- George the Hagiorite (1009–1065, Georgia/Greece, nf)
- Elizabeth George (born 1949, US, f)
- Frances Shayle George (1828–1890, England/N Zealand, p/nf)
- Jean Craighead George (1919–2012, US, ch/nf)
- Jessica Day George (born 1976, US, ch)
- Stefan George (1868–1933, Germany/Switzerland, p)
- Susan George (1934–2026, France/US, nf)
- W. R. P. George (1912–2006, Wales, p)
- Mihalaki Georgiev (1854–1916, Bulgaria, nf)
- Alexander Gerard (1728–1795, Scotland, nf)
- Dorothea Gerard (1855–1915, Scotland/Austria, f)
- Emily Gerard (1849–1905, Scotland/Austria, f)
- Gilbert Gerard (1760–1815, Scotland, nf)
- John Gerard (c. 1545–1612, England, nf)
- Adèle Geras (born 1944, Palestine/England, f/ch)
- Norman Geras (1943–2013, S Rhodesia/England, nf)
- Vicente Gerbasi (1913–1992, Venezuela, p)
- Alain Gerbault (1893–1941, France/E Timor, nf)
- Dan Gerber (born 1940, US, p)
- Michael Gerber (born 1969, US, f/nf)
- Michael Gerber (born 1936, US, nf)
- Alberto Gerchunoff (1883–1950, Russian E/Argentina, f/nf)
- Ágnes Gergely (born 1933, Hungary, p/f), birth name Ágnes Guttmann
- William Gerhardie (1895–1977, England/Russia, f/d)
- Ida Gerhardt (1905–1997, Netherlands, p)
- Paul Gerhardt (1607–1676, Germany, nf/p)
- Robert Gernhardt (1937–2006, Estonia/Germany, nf/p)
- Hugo Gernsback (1884–1967, Luxembourg/US, f)
- Cezary Geroń (1960–1998, Poland, p/nf)
- Nayden Gerov (1823–1900, Bulgaria, nf)
- Tess Gerritsen (born 1953, US, f)
- David Gerrold (born 1944, US, d/f)
- Gina Gershon (born 1962, US, ch/nf)
- Karen Gershon (1923–1993, Germany/England, nf/p/f)
- Friedrich Gerstäcker (1816–1872, Germany, f/nf)
- Heinrich Wilhelm von Gerstenberg (1737–1823, Denmark/Germany, p/nf)
- Salomon Gessner (1730–1788, Switzerland, p)
- Ragnheiður Gestsdóttir (born 1953, Iceland, ch)
- Mark S. Geston (born 1946, US, f)
- Frano Getaldić-Gundulić (1833–1899, Austria-Hungary, nf)
- Amélie Gex (1835–1883, France, p/f), pseudonym Dian de la Jeânna
- Guido Gezelle (1830–1899, Netherlands/Belgium, f/p)

== Gh–Gn ==
- Golriz Ghahraman (born 1981, N Zealand, nf)
- Ghalib (1797–1869, India, p), birth name Mirza Asadullah Baig Khan
- Abdelkrim Ghallab (1919–2017, Morocco, nf/f)
- Fathy Ghanem (1924–1999, Egypt, nf)
- Reza Ghassemi (born 1949, Iran/France, f)
- Radu Pavel Gheo (born 1969, Romania, f/nf)
- Henri Ghéon (1875–1944, France, d/f/p)
- Constantin Virgil Gheorghiu (1916–1992, Romania/France, f)
- Salima Ghezali (born 1958, Algeria, nf)
- Ion Ghica (1816–1897, Wallachia/Romania, nf)
- Pantazi Ghica (1831–1882, Wallachia/Romania, d/p/f)
- Charles Ghigna (born 1946, US, p/ch)
- Jagadish Ghimire (1946–2013, Nepal, f/nf)
- Madhav Prasad Ghimire (1919–2020, Nepal, p/nf)
- Gamal al-Ghitani (1945–2015, Egypt, f/nf)
- Zulfikar Ghose (1935–2022, India/US, f/p/nf)
- Amitav Ghosh (born 1956, India, f/nf)
- Subodh Ghosh (1909–1980, India, nf/f)
- Mohamed Ghozzi (born 1949, Tunisia, p/nf/d)
- Farah Ghuznavi (living, Bangladesh/England, f)
- Charles Gibbon (1843–1890, Scotland/England, f)
- Edward Gibbon (1737–1794, England, nf)
- Lewis Grassic Gibbon (1901–1935, Scotland/England, f)
- Monk Gibbon (1896–1987, Ireland, p/nf)
- Reginald Gibbons (born 1947, US, p/f/nf)
- Ivy Gibbs (c. 1886–1966, N Zealand, p/ch)
- May Gibbs (1877–1969, England/Australia, ch)
- Kahlil Gibran (1883–1931, Ottoman E/US, f/nf/p)
- Edmund Gibson (1669–1748, England, nf)
- G. H. Gibson (1846–1921, England/Australia, p)
- John Gibson (1841–1915, Wales, nf)
- Miles Gibson (born 1947, England, f/p)
- Wilfrid Wilson Gibson (1878–1962, England, p/nf)
- William Gibson (born 1948, US/Canada, f/nf)
- Anthony Giddens (born 1938, England, nf)
- Gary Giddins (born 1948, US, nf)
- André Gide (1869–1951, France, f/nf)
- Kerstin Gier (born 1966, Germany, f/nf)
- Patricia Reilly Giff (1935–2021, US, ch)
- Barry Gifford (born 1946, US, f/nf/p)
- Edwin Gifford (1820–1905, England, nf)
- Isabella Gifford (1825–1891, Wales/England, nf)
- John Gifford (1758–1818, England, nf)
- William Gifford (1756–1826, England, p/nf)
- Zerbanoo Gifford (born 1950, India/England, nf)
- Michael Gifkins (1945–2014, N Zealand, f/nf)
- Nikola Gigov (1937–2016, Bulgaria, p/nf)
- Marnix Gijsen (1899–1984, Belgium, p/f/nf)
- Wim Gijsen (1933–1990, Netherlands, f)
- Augusto Gil (1873–1929, Portugal, p)
- Enrique Gil Gilbert (1912–1973, Ecuador, f/nf/p)
- Harriett Gilbert (born 1948, England, nf)
- Jack Gilbert (1925–2012, US, p)
- Joseph Gilbert (1779–1852, England, nf)
- Kevin Gilbert (1933–1993, Australia, d/nf/p)
- Martin Gilbert (1936–2015, England, nf)
- Michael Gilbert (1912–2006, England, f)
- Ruth Gilbert (1917–2016, N Zealand, p)
- W. S. Gilbert (1836–1911, England, d/p)
- William Gilbert (c. 1544–1603, England, nf)
- William Gilbert (1804–1890, England, f/nf)
- Roger Gilbert-Lecomte (1907–1943, France, p)
- Alexander Gilchrist (1828–1861, England, nf)
- Anne Gilchrist (1828–1885, England/US, nf)
- Annie Somers Gilchrist (1841–1912, US, f/nf/p)
- Robert Murray Gilchrist (1867–1917, England, f/nf)
- Betty Gilderdale (1923–2021, N Zealand, ch)
- Charles Gildon (c. 1665–1724, England, nf/d/p)
- Annabel Giles (born 1959, Wales/England, f)
- Olivia Aroha Giles (born 1962, N Zealand, f/ch)
- Iwan Gilkin (1858–1924, Belgium, p)
- Anton Gill (born 1948, England, f/nf)
- Claes Gill (1910–1973, Norway, p)
- Robin Gill (born 1944, England/Gibraltar, nf)
- Rosalind Gill (born 1963, England, nf)
- Johannes Gillhoff (1861–1930, Germany/US, nf)
- Penelope Gilliatt (1932–1993, England, f/d/nf)
- Alexis A. Gilliland (born 1931, US, f)
- Charlotte Perkins Gilman (1860–1935, US, f/p/nf)
- Florence Magruder Gilmore (1881–1945, US, f/nf/p)
- Maeve Gilmore (1917–1983, England, f/nf)
- Mary Gilmore (1865–1962, Australia, nf/p)
- William Gilpin (1724–1804, nf)
- Ethan Gilsdorf (born 1966, US, nf/p)
- Einarr Gilsson (fl. 1360s, Iceland, p)
- Zuzanna Ginczanka (1917–1945, Russian E/Poland, p), Holocaust victim
- Allen Ginsberg (1926–1997, US, nf/p)
- Louis Ginsberg (1895–1976, US, p)
- Morris Ginsberg (1889–1970, England, nf)
- Natalia Ginzburg (1916–1991, Italy, f/nf)
- Amata Giramata (born 1996, Rwanda/US, p/nf)
- Banira Giri (1946–2021, Nepal, p)
- George Gissing (1857–1903, England/France, f)
- Margo Glantz (born 1930, Mexico, f/nf)
- Édouard Glissant (1928–2011, Martinique/France, f/p/d)
- Franz Karl Ginzkey (1871–1963, Austria-Hungary/Austria, ch/f/nf)
- Dana Gioia (born 1950, US, p/nf)
- Jean Giono (1895–1970, France, f)
- Marosa di Giorgio (1932–2004, Uruguay, p/f)
- Nikki Giovanni (1943–2024, US, p/nf)
- Zinaida Gippius (1869–1945, Russian E/France, p/d/f)
- Fred Gipson (1908–1973, US, f/nf)
- Giglio Gregorio Giraldi (1479–1552, Italy, nf/p)
- Robert Girardi (born 1961, US, f/nf)
- Thomas Girdlestone (1758–1822, England, nf)
- Banira Giri (1946–2021), Nepal, p)
- Oliverio Girondo (1891–1967, Argentina, p)
- Roger Giroux (1925–1974, France, p)
- Thomas Gisborne (1758–1846, England, p/nf)
- Hallgerður Gísladóttir (1952–2007, Iceland, nf/p)
- Þórdís Gísladóttir (born 1965, Iceland, ch/p/f)
- Konráð Gíslason (1808–1891, Iceland, nf)
- Alfred Gissing (1896–1975, England, nf)
- Algernon Gissing (1860–1937, England, f/nf)
- George Gissing (1857–1903, England, f/nf)
- Moraa Gitaa (living, Kenya, f/ch)
- Marianne Githens (1936–2018, US, nf)
- François Giuliani (1938–2009, Algeria/Belgium, nf)
- Giuseppe Giusti (1809–1850, Italy, p/nf)
- Bogomil Gjuzel (1939–2021, Yugoslavia/N Macedonia, p/nf)
- Mary Gladstone (1847–1927, England, nf)
- William Ewart Gladstone (1809–1898, England, nf)
- Malcolm Gladwell (born 1963, England/Canada, nf)
- Lesley Glaister (born 1956, England, f/p/d)
- Abdul Raheem Glailati (20th c., Sudan/Egypt, nf)
- Joseph Glanvill (1636–1680, England, nf)
- Brian Glanville (born 1931, England, f/nf)
- William Nugent Glascock (c. 1787–1847, Ireland/England, f/nf)
- Ellen Glasgow (1873–1945, US, f/nf)
- Katharine Glasier (1867–1950, England, nf/f)
- Conrad Jack Glass (born 1961, Tristan da Cunha, nf)
- Rodge Glass (born 1978, England, f)
- Hannah Glasse (1708–1770, England, nf)
- Johann Rudolf Glauber (1604–1670, Germany/Netherlands, nf)
- Friedrich Glauser (1896–1938, Switzerland, f)
- Johann Wilhelm Ludwig Gleim (1719–1803, Germany, p)
- Marcelo Gleiser (born 1959, Brazil, nf)
- Esther Glen (1881–1940, N Zealand, ch/nf)
- Victoria Glendinning (born 1937, England, f/nf)
- Debi Gliori (born 1959, Scotland, ch)
- Ivan Glišić (born 1942, Yugoslavia/Serbia, nf/p)
- Milovan Glišić (1847–1908, Ottoman E/Austria-Hungary, nf/f)
- Édouard Glissant (1928–2011, Martinique/France, nf/p/f)
- Brian Glover (1934–1997, England, d)
- Denis Glover (1912–1980, N Zealand, p)
- Richard Glover (1712–1785, England, p/nf)
- Louise Glück (born 1943, US, p/nf)
- Elinor Glyn (1864–1943, England, f/d)
- Connie Glynn (born 1994, England, f)
- William Glynne-Jones (1907–1977, Wales/England, f/ch/nf)
- Dieudonné Gnammankou (born 1963, Benin, nf)
- Brannavan Gnanalingam (born 1983, N Zealand, f/nf)
- Christine Adjahi Gnimagnon (born 1945, Benin, nf)

== Go–Gq ==
- Goran Gocić (born 1962, Yugoslavia/England, nf)
- John Godber (born 1956, England, d)
- Robert Goddard (born 1954, England, f)
- Rumer Godden (1907–1998, England/India, f/nf/ch)
- Cyprian Godebski (1765–1809, Duchy of Warsaw, p/f)
- Franciszek Ksawery Godebski (1801–1869, Russian E/France, nf)
- Gérald Godin (1938–1934, Canada, p)
- Charlotte Godley (1821–1907, N Zealand, nf)
- Gail Godwin (born 1937, US, f/d)
- Tom Godwin (1915–1980, US, f)
- William Godwin (1756–1836, England, nf/f)
- William Godwin the Younger (1803–1832, England, f/nf)
- Eilífr Goðrúnarson (fl. 10th c., Iceland, p)
- Patricia Goedicke (1931–2006, US, p)
- Hermann Goedsche (1815–1878, Germany/Poland, f/nf)
- Glenda Goertzen (born 1967, Canada, ch)
- Albrecht Goes (1908–2000, Germany, p/f)
- Johann Wolfgang von Goethe (1749–1832, Germany, p/d/f)
- Rainald Goetz (born 1954, Germany, f/d/nf)
- Guy Goffette (born 1947, Belgium, p/f/nf)
- Octavian Goga (1881–1938, Austria-Hungary/Romania, p/d/nf)
- Iakob Gogebashvili (1840–1912, Russian E, nf/ch)
- Theo van Gogh (1957–2004, Netherlands, d/f/nf)
- Nikolai Gogol (1809–1852, Russian E, f/d)
- Jyoti Gogte (born 1956, India, nf)
- Damião de Góis (1502–1574, Portugal, nf)
- Ziya Gökalp (1876–1924, Ottoman E/Turkey, nf/p)
- Hawa Jande Golakai (born 1979, Germany/Liberia, f/nf)
- Hamdi Abu Golayyel (born 1967/1968, Egypt, f/nf)
- H. L. Gold (1914–1996, US, f)
- Melchior Goldast (1576 or 1578–1635, Switzerland, nf)
- Leah Goldberg (1911–1970, Germany/Israel, p/f/d)
- Christopher Golden (born 1967, US, f/ch)
- John Henry Goldfrap (1879–1917, England/US, ch)
- Julia Golding (born 1969, England, f), pseudonyms Joss Stirling and Eve Edwards
- William Golding (1911–1993, England, f/d/p)
- John M. Goldman (1938–2013, England, nf)
- Lisa Goldman (born 1964, England, nf)
- Marcus J. Goldman (born 1960, US, nf)
- Kenneth Goldsmith (born 1961, US, p/nf)
- Oliver Goldsmith (1730–1774, England, f/d/p)
- Bruce Goldstein (born 1952, New York, nf)
- Anna Goldsworthy (born 1974, Australia, nf/d/f)
- Peter Goldsworthy (born 1951, Australia, f/p/d)
- Vesna Goldsworthy (born 1961, Serbia/England, nf/f/p)
- Daniel Goleman (born 1946, US, nf)
- Dinicu Golescu (1777–1830, Wallachia/Romania, nf)
- Ebrahim Golestan (1922–2023, Iran/England, f)
- Pavel Golia (1887–1959, Austria-Hungary/Yugoslavia, p/d/ch)
- Claire Goll (1890–1977, Germany/France, p/f)
- Yvan Goll (1891–1950, Germany/France, p)
- Victor Gollancz (1893–1967, England, nf)
- Tadej Golob (born 1967, Yugoslavia/Slovenia, f)
- Houshang Golshiri (1938–2000, Iran, f/nf)
- Bogumil Goltz (1801–1870, Poland/Germany, nf)
- Paul Goma (1935–2020, Romania/France, f/nf)
- Jean Ogier de Gombauld (1576–1666, France, d/p)
- Witold Gombrowicz (1904–1969, Poland/Argentina, f/nf/d)
- Dias Gomes (1922–1999, Brazil, d)
- Soeiro Pereira Gomes (1909–1949, Portugal, f)
- Adolfo León Gómez (1857–1927, Colombia, p/d)
- Kosuke Gomi (五味康祐, 1921–1980, Japan, f)
- Junpei Gomikawa (五味川純平, 1916–1995, Japan, f)
- George Gomori (born 1934, Hungary/England, p/nf)
- António Aurélio Gonçalves (1901–1984, Cape Verde, nf/d)
- Ivan Goncharov (1812–1891, Russian E, f/nf)
- Edmond de Goncourt (1822–1896, France, f/nf)
- Jules de Goncourt (1830–1870, France, f)
- Walije Gondwe (born 1936, Nyasaland/Malawi, f)
- Luis de Góngora (1561–1627, Spain, p)
- Gongsun Long (公孫龍, c. 320–250 BCE, China, f/nf)
- Tomás António Gonzaga (1744 – c. 1810, Brazil, p), pseudonym Dirceu
- Sophie Gonzales (born 1992, Australia, f/ch)
- Betina Gonzalez (born 1972, Argentina, f)
- José Luis González (1926–1996, nf/f)
- José Rumazo González (1904–1995, Ecuador, p/nf)
- N. V. M. Gonzalez (1915–1999, Philippines, f/nf/p)
- Elizabeth Gooch (1757–1807, England, nf/p/f)
- Caroline Goodall (born 1959, England, d)
- W. T. Goodge (1862–1909, England/Australia, p/f)
- Lorna Goodison (born 1947, Jamaica, p/f/nf)
- Terry Goodkind (1948–2020, US, f/nf)
- Dic Goodman (1920–2013, Wales, p)
- Martin J. Goodman (born 1956, England, nf/f)
- Paul Goodman (1911–1972, US, p/f/nf)
- Charles A. Goodrich (1790–1862, US, nf/ch)
- Samuel Griswold Goodrich (1793–1860, US, ch), pseudonym Peter Parley
- Geraint Goodwin (1903–1941, Wales, f/nf)
- Jason Goodwin (born 1964, England, nf)
- John Goodwin (1594–1665, England, nf)
- Barnabe Googe (1540–1594, England, p)
- Nirmalendu Goon (born 1945, India/Bangladesh, p)
- Spiridon Gopčević (1855–1928, Austrian E/Germany, nf)
- Nadine Gordimer (1923–2014, S Africa, f/d/nf)
- Adam Lindsay Gordon (1833–1870, England/Australia, p)
- Alexander Gordon (c. 1692–1765, Scotland, nf)
- Caroline Gordon (1895–1981, US, f/nf)
- John Gordon (1925–2017, England, f/ch)
- Roderick Gordon (born 1960, England, ch)
- Catherine Gore (1798–1861, England, f/d)
- Gábor Görgey (1929–2022, Hungary, p/d/f)
- Gorgias (483–375 BCE, Sicily, nf)
- Parsadan Gorgijanidze (1626 – c. 1696, Iran, nf)
- Maxim Gorky (1868–1936, Russian E/Soviet Union, f/d/nf)
- Amanda Gorman (born 1998, US, p)
- Ed Gorman (1941–2016, US, f/nf)
- Wangui wa Goro (born 1961, Kenya/England, p/nf/f)
- Sergey Gorodetsky (1884–1967, Russian E/USSR, p)
- Angélica Gorodischer (1928–2022, Argentina, f)
- Joseph Görres (1776–1848, Germany, nf)
- Juana Manuela Gorriti (1818–1892, Argentina, f)
- Shira Gorshman (1906–2001, Russian E/Israel, f/nf)
- Hedwig Gorski (born 1949, US, p/d)
- Herman Gorter (1864–1927, Netherlands/Belgium, p/nf)
- Goscelin (fl. 11th c., Flanders/England, nf)
- Ray Gosling (1939–2013, England, nf)
- Georgi Gospodinov (born 1968, Bulgaria, f/p/d)
- Edmund Gosse (1849–1928, England, p/nf)
- Marthe Gosteli (1917–2017, Switzerland, nf)
- Phyllis Gotlieb (1926–2009, Canada, f/p)
- Ben Gotō (五島勉, 1929–2020, Japan, nf)
- Gotō Chūgai (後藤宙外, 1866–1938, Japan, nf/f)
- Emperor Go-Toba (後鳥羽天皇, 1180–1239, Japan, p/nf)
- Meisei Gotō (後藤明生, 1932–1999, Japan, f)
- Friedrich Wilhelm Gotter (1746–1797, Germany, p/d)
- Gottfried von Strassburg (died c. 1210, Germany, p)
- Jeremias Gotthelf (1797–1854, Switzerland, n), pseudonym of Albert Bitzius
- Johann Christoph Gottsched (1700–1766, Germany, nf/d)
- Levan Gotua (1905–1973, Russian E/USSR, f)
- Johann Nikolaus Götz (1721–1781, Germany, p)
- Sayed Gouda (born 1968, Egypt/Hong Kong, p/nf)
- Elizabeth Goudge (1900–1984, England, f/ch)
- Ron Goulart (1933–2022, US, nf/f)
- Alan Gould (born 1949, Australia, f/nf/p)
- Cecil Gould (1918–1994, England, nf)
- Judith Gould (born 1945 and 1952, Austria/US, f), pseudonym of Nicholas Peter "Nick" Bienes and Rhea Gallaher
- Rupert Gould (1890–1948, England, nf)
- Stephen Jay Gould (1941–2002, US, nf)
- William Gould (1715–1799, England, nf)
- Sophie el Goulli (1932–2015, Tunisia, p/ch/nf)
- Muhammad Loutfi Goumah (1886–1953, Egypt, nf)
- Emilie Gourd (1879–1946, Switzerland, nf)
- Candy Gourlay (born 1962, Philippines/England, ch/nf)
- Remy de Gourmont (1858–1815, France, p/f/nf)
- Michal Govrin (born 1950, Israel, f/p)
- Iris Gower (1935–2010, Wales, n)
- John Gower (c. 1330–1408, England, p)
- Emily Gowers (born 1963, England, nf)
- Étienne Goyémidé (1942–1997, Central African R, f/d)
- Juan Goytisolo (1931–2017, Spain, p/nf/f)
- Khaya Gqibitole (living, S Africa, f/d)

== Gr–Gy ==
- Hermine de Graaf (1951–2013, Netherlands, f)
- Christian Dietrich Grabbe (1801–1836, Germany, d/p)
- Stefan Grabiński (1887–1936, Poland, f/d)
- Alfred Augustus Grace (1867–1942, N Zealand, f)
- Patricia Grace (born 1937, N Zealand, f/ch)
- Chaim Grade (1910–1982, Lithuania/US, f/nf)
- Branko Gradišnik (born 1951, Yugoslavia/Slovenia, f/nf)
- Janez Gradišnik (1917–2009, Yugoslavia/Slovenia, nf/f)
- Oskar Maria Graf (1894–1967, Germany/US, nf)
- Françoise de Graffigny (1695–1758, Lorraine/France, f/d)
- Anders Abraham Grafström (1790–1870, Sweden, nf/p)
- Joe de Graft (1924–1978, Gold Coast/Ghana, nf/p)
- Sue Grafton (1940–2017, US, f)
- Cork Graham (born 1964, US, f)
- Harry Graham (1874–1936, England, p/nf)
- Heather Graham (born 1953, US, f), pseudonym Heather Graham Pozzessere
- James Graham, 1st Marquess of Montrose (1612–1650, Scotland, p)
- Jorie Graham (born 1950, US, p)
- Maria Graham (1785–1842, England, nf/ch)
- Stephen Graham (1884–1975, Scotland/US, nf/f)
- Virginia Graham (1910–1993, England, nf/p)
- W. S. Graham (1918–1986, Scotland/England, p)
- Andrew Graham-Dixon (born 1960, England, nf)
- James Grahame (1765–1811, Scotland, p)
- Kenneth Grahame (1859–1932, Scotland/England, ch)
- Andrew Graham-Yooll (1944–2019, Argentina, nf)
- Jakub Grajchman (1822–1897, Austria-Hungary/Hungary, p/d)
- Xavier Grall (1930–1981, France, nf/p)
- Ion Grămadă (1886–1917, Austria-Hungary/Romania, nf)
- Hardie Gramatky (1907–1979, US, ch)
- Natalie Grams (born 1978, Germany, nf)
- Sara Gran (born 1971, US, f/d)
- Alberto Granado (1922–2011, Argentina/Cuba, nf)
- Javier del Granado (1913–1996, Bolivia, p)
- Romualdas Granauskas (1939–2014, Soviet Union/Lithuania, f)
- Euler Granda (1935–2018, Ecuador, p)
- Zorka Grandov (1947–2021, Yugoslavia/Serbia, nf)
- Mark Granier (born 1957, England/Ireland, p)
- Mary Grannan (1900–1975, Canada, ch)
- Paul Grano (1894–1975, Australia, p)
- Adam Grant (born 1981, US, nf)
- Alex Grant (living, Scotland/US, p)
- Anne Grant (1755–1838, Scotland/US, p/nf)
- Asahel Grant (1807–1844, US, nf)
- Charles L. Grant (1942–2006, US, f)
- Gwen Grant (born 1940, England, ch)
- Joan Grant (1907–1989, England, f/nf)
- John Grant (1930–2014, Scotland, ch)
- Linda Grant (born 1951, England, f/nf)
- Michael Grant (1914–2004, US, nf)
- Michael Grant (born 1954, US, ch)
- Michael Grant (born 1940, US, f)
- Günter Grass (1927–2015, Germany, f/nf)
- Patricia Grasso (born 1950, US, f)
- Olga Grau (born 1945, Chile, nf)
- Elsa Grave (1918–2003, Sweden, f/p)
- Alfred Perceval Graves (1846–1931, Ireland/Wales, p/nf)
- Charles Patrick Graves (1899–1971, England/Barbados, nf/f)
- Clotilde Graves (1863–1932, Ireland, d), pseudonym Richard Dehan
- Frank Pierrepont Graves (1869–1956, US, nf)
- Richard Graves (1715–1804, England, nf/p/f)
- Richard Harry Graves (1897–1971, Ireland/Australia, p/f)
- Robert Graves (1895–1985, England/Majorca, p/f/nf)
- Alasdair Gray (1934–2019, Scotland, f/d/p)
- Alexander Gray (1882–1968, Scotland, nf/p)
- Charlotte E. Gray (1873–1926, US, f/nf)
- Elizabeth Caroline Gray (1800–1887, Scotland/England, nf)
- Harriet Gray (1897–1985, England, f), pseudonym of Denise Robins
- John Gray (born 1951, US, nf)
- Maxwell Gray (1846–1923, England, f/p), pseudonym of Mary Gleed Tuttiett
- Nicholas Stuart Gray (1922–1981, Scotland/England, d/ch)
- Patience Gray (1917–2005, England/Italy, nf)
- Robert Gray (1945–2025, Australia, p/nf)
- Simon Gray (1936–2008, England, d/nf)
- Stephen Gray (1941–2020, S Africa, f/d/p)
- Thomas Gray (1716–1771, England, p/nf)
- Benoît Gréan (born 1957, France/Italy, p/nf)
- Andrew Greeley (1928–2013, US, nf/f)
- Abigail Green (living, England, nf)
- Candida Lycett Green (1942–2014, England, nf)
- Charmaine Papertalk Green (1962–2025, Australia, p)
- Dorothy Auchterlonie Green (1915–1991, Australia, nf/p)
- Eliza S. Craven Green (1803–1866, England, p)
- Geoffrey Green (1911–1990, England, nf)
- Grace Winifred Green (1907–1976, N Zealand, nf)
- H. M. Green (1881–1962, Australia, nf)
- Hank Green (born 1980, Australia, f)
- Henry Green (1905–1973, England, f)
- James Green (born 1944, England, nf/f)
- Jane Green (born 1968, England/US, f)
- John Green (born 1977, US, f)
- John M. Green (born 1953, Australia, f)
- Julien Green (1900–1998, France/US, f/nf/d)
- Michael Cawood Green (born 1954, S Africa, nf/f)
- Paula Green (born 1955, N Zealand, p/ch)
- Roger Lancelyn Green (1918–1987, England, nf/ch)
- Kate Greenaway (1846–1901, England, ch)
- Cordelia A. Greene (1831–1905, US, nf)
- Frances Nimmo Greene (1867–1937, US, f)
- Gael Greene (1933–2022, US, nf/f)
- Graham Greene (1904–1991, England, f/nf/ch)
- Melissa Fay Greene (born 1952, US, nf)
- Robert Greene (1558–1592, England, d/nf)
- Robert Greene (born 1959, US, nf)
- Sonia Greene (1883–1972, US, p/f/d)
- Tilly Greene (living, US, f)
- Lavinia Greenlaw (born 1962, England, p/f)
- Sam Greenlee (1930–2014, US, f/p)
- Gavin Greenlees (1930–1983, Australia, p)
- Dora Greenwell (1821–1882, England, p)
- Adrian Greenwood (1973–2016, England, nf)
- Frederick Greenwood (1830–1909, England, nf/f)
- James Greenwood (1832–1927, England, nf/f/ch)
- Lisa Greenwood (born 1955, N Zealand, f)
- Walter Greenwood (1903–1974, England, f)
- James Greer (born 1971, US, f/d/nf)
- Linda Gregg (1942–2019, US, p)
- Walter Gregor (1825–1897, Scotland, nf)
- Jozef Gregor-Tajovský (1874–1940, Hungary/Czechoslovakia, d/p)
- Ferdinand Gregorovius (1821–1891, Germany, nf)
- Gregory of Narek (c. 950–1003/1011, Armenia, p/nf)
- Horace Gregory (1898–1982, US, p/nf)
- Kristiana Gregory (born 1951, US, ch)
- Philippa Gregory (born 1954, England, f)
- Jessica Gregson (born 1978, US, f/nf)
- Martin Greif (1839–1911, Germany, p/d)
- León de Greiff (1895–1976, Colombia, p)
- Anna Gréki (1931–1966, Algeria, nf/p)
- Wilfred Grenfell (1865–1940, England/Labrador, nf)
- Josef Greiner (1886–1971, Austrian E/Austria, nf)
- Eamon Grennan (born 1941, Ireland/US, p)
- Kate Grenville (born 1950, Australia, f/nf)
- Jean-Baptiste-Louis Gresset (1709–1777, France, p/d)
- H. W. Gretton (1914–1983, N Zealand, p/nf/f)
- Charles Greville (1794–1865, England, nf)
- Fulke Greville, 1st Baron Brooke (1554–1628, England, p/d)
- Jacques Grévin (c. 1539–1570, France/Italy, d)
- Elizabeth Caroline Grey (1798–1869, England, f)
- Zane Grey (1872–1939), US, f)
- Nordahl Grieg (1902–1943, Norway, p/f/nf), Holocaust victim
- Friedrich Griese (1890–1975, Germany, f)
- Mildred Grieveson (born 1946, England, f), pseudonym Anne Mather
- Gerald Griffin (1803–1840, Ireland, f/p/d)
- Susan Griffin (born 1943, US, nf/d)
- W. E. B. Griffin (1929–2019, US, f), pseudonym of William Edmund Butterworth III
- Andy Griffiths (born 1961, Australia, ch/d)
- Ann Griffiths (1776–1805, Wales, p)
- Arthur Griffiths (1838–1908, nf)
- Bill Griffiths (1948–2007, England, p/nf)
- J. Gwyn Griffiths (1911–2004, Wales, p/nf)
- Jane Griffiths (born 1970, England, p/nf)
- Mariela Griffor (born 1961, Chile/US, p)
- Elder Grigorije (fl. 1310–1355, Serbia, p/nf)
- Geoffrey Grigson (1905–1985, England, p/nf)
- Jane Grigson (1928–1990, England, nf)
- Sophie Grigson (born 1959, England, nf)
- Franz Grillparzer (1791–1872, Austrian E, d/p)
- Nicholas Grimald (1519–1562, England, p/d)
- Angelina Weld Grimké (1880–1958, US, nf/d/p)
- Charlotte Forten Grimké (1837–1914, US, nf/p)
- Grimké sisters (Sarah Moore Grimké, 1792–1873, and Angelina Emily Grimké, 1805–1879, US, nf)
- Brothers Grimm (1785–1863 and 1786–1859, Germany, nf)
- Matthias T. J. Grimme (born 1953, Germany, nf)
- Hans Jakob Christoffel von Grimmelshausen (1621/1622–1676, Germany, f)
- Vigdís Grímsdóttir (born 1953, Iceland, p/f/ch)
- Beate Grimsrud (1863–1920, Norway, f/ch/d)
- Charlotte Grimshaw (born 1966, N Zealand, f/nf)
- Stefán Hörður Grímsson (1919–2002, Iceland, p)
- Elizabeth Grimston (c. 1563 – c. 1603, England, p)
- Jon Courtenay Grimwood (born 1953, Malta/US, f), also Jonathan Grimwood
- Ken Grimwood (1944–2003, US, f), pseudonym Alan Cochran
- Leopold Hartley Grindon (1818–1904, England, nf)
- Lester Grinspoon (1928–2020, US, nf)
- Maria Gripe (1923–2007, Sweden, ch)
- John Grisham (born 1955, US, f)
- Rufus Wilmot Griswold (1815–1857, US, p/nf)
- Anne-Lise Grobéty (1949–2010, Switzerland, f/p/d)
- Stanisław Grochowiak (1934–1976, Poland, p/d)
- Georg Groddeck (1866–1934, Germany, nf/f)
- Alma De Groen (born 1941, N Zealand/Australia, d)
- Johan Fredrik Grøgaard (born 1934, Norway, f/ch)
- Milan Grol (1876–1952, Serbia/Yugoslavia, nf)
- Ukawsaw Gronniosaw (c. 1705–1775, Bornu Empire/England, nf), also called James Albert
- Kathleen Clarice Groom (1872–1954, Australia/England, f), pseudonym Kit Dealtry
- Robert Groome (1810–1889, England, f)
- Annie Groovie (born 1970, Canada, ch), born Annie Trudelle
- Francis Grose (1731–1791, England, nf)
- Elgin Groseclose (1899–1983, US, nf)
- Jean Grosjean (1912–2006, France, p/nf)
- Viv Groskop (born 1973, England, nf)
- Hans Gross (1847–1915, Austrian E, nf)
- Philip Gross (born 1952, England, p/f/ch)
- David Grossman (born 1954, Israel, f/nf/ch/p)
- Vasily Grossman (1905–1964, Russian E/USSR, f/nf)
- Edith Searle Grossmann (1863–1931, N Zealand, f/nf)
- George Grossmith (1847–1912, England, f)
- Weedon Grossmith (1854–2019, England, f/p)
- George Grote (1794–1871, England, nf)
- Harriet Grote (1792–1878, England, nf)
- Klaus Groth (1819–1899, Denmark/Germany, p)
- Gilbert G. Groud (born 1956, Ivory Coast/Switzerland, nf)
- Paul Groussac (1848–1929, France/Argentina, nf)
- Frederick Philip Grove (1879–1948, Germany/Canada, f), born Felix Paul Greve
- Annie Groves (1946–2011, England, f), pseudonym of Penny Jordan
- Paul Groves (born 1947, England/Wales, p/nf)
- Isabel Grubb (1881–1972, Ireland, nf)
- Igo Gruden (1893–1948, Austria-Hungary/Yugoslavia, p)
- Johnny Gruelle (1880–1938, US, ch)
- Kim Gruenenfelder (born 1967, US, f/d)
- Elis Gruffydd (1490–1552, Wales/England, nf)
- Owen Gruffydd (1643–1730, Wales, p)
- R. Geraint Gruffydd (1928–2015, Wales, nf)
- William John Gruffydd (1881–1954, Wales, nf/p)
- Nikanor Grujić (1810–1887, Austria-Hungary, nf/p)
- Durs Grünbein (born 1962, Germany, p/nf)
- Arnon Grunberg (born 1971, Netherlands/US, f/nf)
- N. F. S. Grundtvig (1783–1872, Denmark, nf/p)
- Bertha Jane Grundy (1837–1912, England, f/p/d)
- Juozas Grušas (1901–1986, Russian E/Soviet Union, d)
- Henryk Grynberg (born 1936, Poland, f/p/d)
- Andreas Gryphius (1616–1664, Germany, p/d)
- Frode Grytten (born 1960, Norway, f/p)
- Wioletta Grzegorzewska (born 1974, Poland/England, p/f)
- Bernhard Grzimek (1909–1987, Germany, nf)
- Martin Grzimek (born 1950, Germany, f)
- Michael Grzimek (1934–1959, Germany/Tanganyika, nf)
- Gu Cheng (顧城, 1956–1993, China, p/nf/f)
- Gu Hua (羅鴻玉, born 1942, China, f/nf)
- Gu Jiegang (顧頡剛, 1893–1980, China, nf)
- Gu Taiqing (顧太清, 1799 – c. 1877, China, p/f)
- Guan Daosheng (管道昇, 1262–1319, China, p)
- Guan Hanqing (關漢卿, c. 1241–1320, China, d/p)
- Gloria Guardia (1940–2019, Panama, f/nf)
- Rósa Guðmundsdóttir (1795–1855, Iceland, p)
- Böðvar Guðmundsson (born 1939, Iceland, d/p/ch)
- Einar Már Guðmundsson (born 1954, Iceland, f/p)
- Halldór Guðmundsson (born 1956, Iceland, nf)
- Jón lærði Guðmundsson (1574–1658, Iceland, p)
- Kristmann Guðmundsson (1901–1983, Iceland, f)
- Tómas Guðmundsson (1901–1983, Iceland, p)
- Josué Guébo (born 1972, Ivory Coast, f/d/ch)
- Philip Guedalla (1889–1944, England, nf)
- Faïza Guène (born 1985, France, f)
- Abdellah Guennoun (1908–1989, Morocco/Tangier, nf/p)
- R. M. Guéra (born 1959, Yugoslavia/Spain, f), pseudonym of Rajko Milošević
- Maurice de Guérin (1810–1839, France, p)
- Jeff Guess (born 1948, Australia, p)
- Soumaya Naamane Guessous (living, Morocco, nf)
- Barbara Guest (1920–2006, US, p/nf/d)
- Edgar Guest (1881–1959, England/US, p)
- Paul Guest (living, US, p/nf)
- Che Guevara (1928–1967, Argentina/Bolivia, nf)
- Anton-Andreas Guha (1937–2010, Germany, nf)
- Bimal Guha (born 1952, Pakistan/Bangladesh, p/ch/nf)
- Ganggang Hu Guidice (胡剛剛, born 1984, China, nf/f)
- Pedro Guilherme-Moreira (born 1969, Portugal, f/nf)
- Georges Guillain (1876–1961, France, nf)
- Guillaume de Lorris (c. 1200 – c. 1240, France, nf/p)
- Jorge Guillén (1893–1984, Spain, p/nf)
- Nicolás Guillén (1903–1989, Cuba, p/nf)
- Pernette Du Guillet (c. 1520 – 1545, France, p)
- Eugène Guillevic (1907–1997, France, p)
- Jan Guillou (born 1944, Sweden, nf/f)
- Paul Guimard (1921–2004, France, f)
- Bernardo Guimarães (1825–1884, Brazil, p/f)
- Wyman Guin (1915–1989, US, f)
- Guido Guinizelli (c. 1225–1276, Italy, p)
- Daphne Guinness (born 1967, England, p)
- Guiot de Provins (died post-1208, France, p)
- Ricardo Güiraldes (1886–1927, Argentina, f/p)
- Arthur Guirdham (1905–1992, England, f/nf)
- Frédéric Guirma (1931–2024, Burkina Faso, nf)
- Malcolm Guite (born 1957, Nigeria/England, p/nf)
- Gül Baba (died 1541, Ottoman E, p)
- Trygve Gulbranssen (1894–1962, Norway, f/nf)
- Robert van Gulik (1910–1967, Netherlands, f)
- Ferreira Gullar (1930–2016, Brazil, p/d/nf), pseudonym of José Ribamar Ferreira
- Hjalmar Gullberg (1898–1961, Sweden, p/d)
- Geir Gulliksen (born 1963, Norway, p/f/ch)
- Olav Gullvåg (1885–1961, Norway, d/f/p)
- Andrei Gulyashki (1914–1995, Bulgaria, f)
- Alex La Guma (1924–1985, S Africa, f/nf)
- Nataliya Gumenyuk (born 1983, Ukraine, nf)
- Nikolay Gumilyov (1886–1921, Russia/USSR, p/nf)
- Martin Gumpert (1897–1955, Germany/US, nf)
- Gunnar Bull Gundersen (1929–1993, Norway, f/d)
- Đivo Šiškov Gundulić (1678–1721, Ragusa, p)
- Ivan Gundulić (1589–1638, Ragusa, p)
- Romesh Gunesekera (born 1954, Sri Lanka/England, f)
- Kirsty Gunn (born 1960, N Zealand, f)
- Thom Gunn (1929–2004, England/US, p)
- Elín Ebba Gunnarsdóttir (born 1953, Iceland, f)
- Halla Gunnarsdóttir (born 1981, Iceland, nf)
- Kristín Helga Gunnarsdóttir (born 1963, Iceland, ch/nf/f)
- Ólafur Gunnarsson (born 1948, Iceland, f/ch/p)
- Gunnlaugr ormstunga (c. 983–1008, Iceland, p)
- Álfrún Gunnlaugsdóttir (1938–2021, Iceland, f)
- Gunnar Gunnarsson (1889–1975, Iceland, f)
- Pétur Gunnarsson (born 1947, Iceland, p/f/d)
- Elizabeth Gunning (1769–1823, England, f)
- Susannah Gunning (c. 1740–1800, England, f)
- Reşat Nuri Güntekin (1889–1956, Ottoman E/England, f/d)
- Johann Christian Günther (1695–1723, Germany, p)
- Asriel Günzig (1868–1931, Austrian Empire/Belgium, nf)
- Guo Jingming (郭敬明, born 1983, China, ch)
- Guo Moruo (郭沫若, 1892–1978, China, nf/p)
- Guo Pu (郭璞, 276–324 CE, China, p/nf)
- Guo Shoujing (郭守敬, 1231–1316, China, nf)
- Shusha Guppy (1935–2008, Iran/England, p)
- Halil Gür (born 1951, Netherlands, f/ch)
- Peter Guralnick (born 1943, US, nf)
- Lee Gurga (born 1949, US, p)
- Abdulrazak Gurnah (born 1948, Zanzibar/England, f)
- Ivor Gurney (1890–1937, England, p)
- Sabri Gürses (born 1972, Turkey, p/f)
- Toya Gurung (born 1948, Nepal, p)
- Lars Gustafsson (1936–2016, Sweden, p/f/nf)
- Albert Paris Gütersloh (1887–1973, Austria, nf)
- Ari Trausti Guðmundsson (born 1948, Iceland, nf)
- James Guthrie (c. 1612–1661, Scotland, nf)
- John Guthrie (1905–1955, N Zealand, nf/f)
- Juan María Gutiérrez (1809–1878, Argentina, nf/p)
- Pedro Juan Gutiérrez (born 1950, Cuba, f/p/nf)
- Dan Gutman (born 1955, US, ch)
- D. D. Guttenplan (living, US, nf)
- Karl Gutzkow (1811–1878, Germany, f/nf)
- Rosa Guy (1822–1912, Trinidad/US, f/ch)
- Emma Jane Guyton (1825–1887, England, f)
- Martín Luis Guzmán (1887–1976, Mexico, f)
- Slavomir Gvozdenovici (born 1953, Romania, p)
- Mafika Gwala (1946–2014, S Africa, p/nf)
- Bethan Gwanas (born 1962, Wales, f/ch), pseudonym of Bethan Evans
- William Gwavas (1676–1741, England, nf)
- Henry Melvill Gwatkin (1844–1916, England, nf)
- Gwynn ap Gwilym (1950–2016, Wales, p/f)
- Yaa Gyasi (born 1989, Ghana/US, f/nf)
- Htin Gyi (1916–2004, Burma/Myanmar, nf)
- Lars Gyllensten (1921–2006, Sweden, p/f)
- Þorsteinn Gylfason (1942–2005, Iceland, nf/p)
- Beth Gylys (born 1964, US, p)
- István Gyöngyösi (1620–1704, Hungary, p)
- Géza Gyóni (1884–1917, Hungary/Russia, p)
- Brion Gysin (1916–1986, England, p)
- Gabor G. Gyukics (born 1958, Hungary/US, p)
