= Bókmenntaverðlaun starfsfólks bókaverslana =

Icelandic literary prizes

Bókmenntaverðlaun starfsfólks bókaverslana ('Literature Prize of the Staff of Bookshops') are a set of Icelandic literary prizes which are awarded by the Icelandic Félag starfsfólks bókaverslana ('Union of Bookshop Staff') in December every year. The prizes were first awarded in 2000, the same year as the union was founded. The awards are made in the midst of the annual Christmas rush in the Icelandic book market (known as the jólabókaflóð) and generally attract a lot of interest.

Three books are nominated in each of seven categories and the winner in each category is decorated with a special mark and so easily recognised in bookshops.

The union also awards Lóð á vogarskál íslenskra bókmennta during Iceland's book-week.

== Winners ==
=== 2014 ===
- Ófeigur Sigurðsson, Öræfi (Best Icelandic novel)
- Snorri Baldursson, Lífríki Íslands (Best handbook)
- Helga Guðrún Johnson, Saga þeirra, sagan mín / Jóhanna Kristjónsdóttir, Svarthvítir dagar (Best biography)
- Kristín Eiríksdóttir, Kok (Best poetry book)
- David Walliams, Rottuborgari (Best translated children's book)
- Ævar Þór Benediktsson, Þín eigin þjóðsaga (Best Icelandic children's book)
- Bryndís Björgvinsdóttir, Hafnfirðingabrandarinn (besta ungmennabókin)
- Hannah Kent, Náðarstund (Best translated novel)

=== 2013 ===
- Sjón, Mánasteinn - drengurinn sem aldrei var til (Best Icelandic novel)
- Guðbjörg Kristjánsdóttir, Íslenska teiknibókin (Best handbook)
- Sigrún Pálsdóttir, Sigrún og Friðgeir - Ferðasaga (Best biography)
- Bjarki Karlsson, Árleysi alda (Best poetry book)
- David Walliams, Amma glæpon (Best translated children's book)
- Vilhelm Anton Jónsson, Vísindabók Villa (Best Icelandic children's book)
- Fredrik Backman, Maður sem heitir Ove (Best translated novel)

=== 2012 ===
- Eiríkur Örn Norðdahl, Illska (Best Icelandic novel)
- Dr. Gunni, Stuð vors lands (Best handbook)
- Ingibjörg Reynisdóttir, Gísli á Uppsölum (Best biography)
- Megas, Megas - textar 1966–2011 (Best poetry book)
- Jakob Martin Strid, Ótrúleg saga um risastóra peru (Best translated children's book)
- Þórdís Gísladóttir, Randalín og Mundi (Best Icelandic children's book)
- Jennifer Egan, Nútíminn er trunta (Best translated novel)

=== 2011 ===
- Jón Kalman Stefánsson, Hjarta mannsins / Steinunn Sigurðardóttir, Jójó (Best Icelandic novel)
- Jónas Kristjánssson, 1001 þjóðleið (Best handbook)
- Hannes Pétursson, Jarðlag í tímanum (Best biography)
- Þorsteinn frá Hamri, Allt kom það nær (Best poetry book)
- Biro Val, Dæmisögur Esóps (Best translated children's book)
- Bryndís Björgvinsdóttir, Flugan sem stöðvaði stríðið (Best Icelandic children's book)
- Jonas Jonasson, Gamlinginn sem skreið út um gluggann og hvarf (Best translated novel)

=== 2010 ===
- Bergsveinn Birgisson, Svar við bréfi Helgu (Best Icelandic novel)
- Ragnar Axelsson, Veiðimenn norðursins (Best handbook)
- Guðni Th. Jóhannesson, Gunnar Thoroddsen (Best biography)
- Gerður Kristný, Blóðhófnir (Best poetry book)
- Annabel Karmel, Þú getur eldað (Best translated children's book)
- Þórarinn Eldjárn, Árstíðirnar (Best Icelandic children's book)
- Sofi Oksanen, Hreinsun (Best translated novel)

=== 2009 ===
- Jón Kalman Stefánsson, Harmur englanna (Best Icelandic novel)
- Helgi Björnsson, Jöklar á Íslandi (Best handbook)
- Páll Valsson, Vigdís (Best biography)
- Gyrðir Elíasson, Nokkur almenn orð um kulnun sólar (Best poetry book)
- Mario Ramos, Hver er sterkastur? (Best translated children's book)
- Köttur úti í mýri, ritstj. Silja Aðalsteinsdóttir (Best Icelandic children's book)
- Carlos Ruiz Zafón, Leikur engilsins (Best translated novel)

=== 2008 ===
- Einar Kárason, Ofsi (Best Icelandic novel)
- David Burnie, Dýrin (Best handbook)
- Sigmundir Ernir Rúnarsson, Magnea (Best biography)
- Páll Ólafsson, Eg skal kveða um eina þig alla mína daga: ástarljóð Páls Ólafssonar (Best poetry book)
- Mario Ramos, Hver er flottastur? (Best translated children's book)
- Gerður Kristný, Garðurinn (Best Icelandic children's book)
- Markus Zusak, Bókaþjófurinn (Best translated novel)

=== 2007 ===
- Jón Kalman Stefánsson, Himnaríki og helvíti (Best Icelandic novel)
- Maðurinn - leiðsögn í máli og myndum (Best handbook)
- Vigdís Grímsdóttir, Bíbí (Best biography)
- Kristín Svava Tómasdóttir, Blótgælur (Best poetry book)
- J. K. Rowling, Harry Potter og dauðadjásnin (Best translated children's book)
- Þórarinn Eldjárn, Gælur, fælur og þvælur (Best Icelandic children's book)
- Khaled Hosseini, Þúsund bjartar sólir (Best translated novel)

=== 2006 ===
- Bragi Ólafsson, Sendiherrann (Best Icelandic novel)
- Andri Snær Magnason, Draumalandið – sjálfshjálparbók handa hræddri þjóð (Best handbook)
- Halldór Guðmundsson, Skáldalíf (Best biography)
- Ingunn Snædal, Guðlausir menn (Best poetry book)
- Ernest Drake, Drekabókin (Best translated children's book)
- Guðrún Helgadóttir, Öðruvísi saga (Best Icelandic children's book)
- Vikas Swarup, Viltu vinna milljarð? (Best translated novel)

=== 2005 ===
- Sjón, Argóarflísin (Best Icelandic novel)
- Þórarinn Eldjárn, Hættir og mörk (Best poetry book)
- Hans H. Hansen, Íslandsatlas (Best handbook)
- Áslaug Jónsdóttir, Gott kvöld(Best Icelandic children's book)
- Gerður Kristný og Thelma Ásdísardóttir, Myndin af Pabba – Saga Thelmu (Best biography)
- Jorge Louis Zafrón, Skuggi vindsins (Best translated novel)
- Christopher Paolini, Eragon (Best translated children's book)

=== 2004 ===
- Bragi Ólafsson, Samkvæmisleikir (Best Icelandic novel)
- Mark Haddon, Furðulegt háttalag hunds um nótt (Best translated novel)
- Rakel Helmsdal, Kalle Güettler, and Áslaug Jónsdóttir; Nei, sagði litla skrímslið (Best Icelandic children's book)
- Julia Donaldson and Axel Scheffler, Greppibarnið (Best translated children's book)
- Sigfús Bjartmarsson, Andræði (Best poetry book)
- Halldór Guðmundsson, Halldór Laxness (Best biography)
- Snævarr Guðmundsson, Íslenskur stjörnuatlas (Best handbook)

=== 2003 ===
- Ólafur Gunnarsson, Öxin og jörðin (Best Icelandic novel)
- Gyrðir Elíasson, Tvífundnaland (Best poetry book)
- Sigrún Eldjárn, Týndu augun (Best Icelandic children's book)
- Þráinn Bertelsson, Einhvers konar ég (Best biography)
- Dan Brown, Da Vinci lykillinn, translated by Ásta S. Guðbjartsdóttir (Best translated novel)
- Zizou Corder, Ljónadrengurinn, translated by Guðrún Eva Mínervudóttir (Best translated children's book)

=== 2002 ===
- Andri Snær Magnason, LoveStar (Best Icelandic novel)
- Michel Houellebecq, Interventions (Best translated novel)
- Thorvaldur Thorsteinsson, Blíðfinnur og svörtu teningarnir – ferðin til Targíu (Best Icelandic children's book)
- Philip Pullman, The Amber Spyglass (Best translated children's book)
- Ingibjörg Haraldsdóttir, Hvar sem ég verð? (Best poetry book)
- Einar Kárason, KK – Þangað sem vindurinn blæs (Best biography)
- Þór Whitehead, Ísland í hers höndum (Best handbook)

=== 2001 ===
- Hallgrímur Helgason, Höfundur Íslands (Best Icelandic novel)
- Jaroslav Hašek, The Good Soldier Švejk (Best translated novel)
- Þórarinn Eldjárn, Grannmeti og átvextir (Best Icelandic children's book)
- J. K. Rowling, Harry Potter and the Goblet of Fire (Best translated children's book)
- Sigurður Pálsson, Ljóðtímaleit (Best poetry book)
- Sigríður Dúna Kristmundsdóttir, Björg: ævisaga Bjargar C. Þorláksson (Best biography)
- Gunnar L. Hjálmarsson, Eru ekki allir í stuði? Rokk á Íslandi á síðustu öld (Best handbook)

=== 2000 ===
- Einar Már Guðmundsson, Draumar á jörðu (Best Icelandic novel)
- Isabel Allende, Daughter of Fortune (Best translated novel)
- Þorvaldur Þorsteinsson, Ert þú Blíðfinnur?: ég er með mikilvæg skilaboð (Best Icelandic children's book)
- J. K. Rowling, Harry Potter and the Prisoner of Azkaban (Best translated children's book)
- Sigurbjörg Þrastardóttir, Hnattflug (Best poetry book)
