= Bókmenntaverðlaun Tómasar Guðmundssonar =

Icelandic poetry award

The Bókmenntaverðlaun Tómasar Guðmundssonar (Tómas Guðmundsson literature award) is an award which the city of Reykjavík awards in memory of the poet Tómas Guðmundsson. The award was first made in 1994, and thereafter every other year up to 2005, whereupon the award was made annually. The award is given to an unpublished poetry collection, which is then published.

== Award winners ==
- 1994 - Helgi Ingólfsson, Letrað í vindinn
- 1997 - Ebba Gunnarsdóttir, Sumar sögur
- 1998 - Bjarni Bjarnason, Borgin bak við orðin
- 2000 - Hjörtur Björgvin Marteinsson, AM 00
- 2002 - Sigurbjörg Þrastardóttir, Sólar Saga
- 2004 - Auður Ava Ólafsdóttir, Rigning í nóvember
- 2006 - Ingunn Snædal, Guðlausir menn - Hugleiðingar um jökulvatn og ást
- 2007 - Ari Jóhannesson, Öskudagar
- 2008 - Magnús Sigurðsson, Fiðrildi, mynta og spörfuglar Lesbíu
- 2009 - Eyþór Árnason, Hundgá úr annarri sveit
- 2010 - Þórdís Gísladóttir, Leyndarmál annarra.
- 2011 - Sindri Freysson Í klóm dalalæðunnar
- 2012 - Dagur Hjartarson, Þar sem vindarnir hvílast - og fleiri einlæg ljóð
- 2013 - Bjarki Karlsson, Árleysi alda
- 2014 - Hjörtur Marteinsson, Alzheimer-tilbrigðin
- 2015 - Ragnar Helgi Ólafsson, Til hughreystingar þeim sem finna sig ekki í samtíma sínum
- 2016 - Eyrún Ósk Jónsdóttir, Góðfúslegt leyfi til sígarettukaupa
- 2017 - Jónas Reynir Gunnarsson, Stór olíuskip
- 2018 - Haukur Ingvarssonar, Vistarverur
- 2019 - Harpa Rún Kristjánsdóttir, Edda
- 2020 - Ragnheiður Lárusdóttir, 1900 og eitthvað

== Sources ==
- "Vefur Reykjavíkurborgar - Bókmenntaverðlaun Tómasar Guðmundssonar".
