= Bjarki Karlsson =

Icelandic poet, translator, linguist, and systems analyst (born 1965)

Bjarki Karlsson (born 1965) is an Icelandic poet, translator, linguist, and systems analyst. His first poetry collection, Árleysi alda, won the Bókmenntaverðlaun Tómasar Guðmundssonar (Tómas Guðmundsson Award) for 2013. and the Bókmenntaverðlaun starfsfólks bókaverslana in the poetry category in the same year. The book was Iceland's best-selling poetry collection in 2013. His poem Þúsaldarháttur is satirical in nature:

== Personal life ==
He is active in Ásatrúarfélagið where he was a board member from 2011 to 2013. After stepping down from the board, he has continued to work with the organization's website.

== Bibliography ==
=== Poetry ===
- Árleysi alda. Akranes: Uppheimar, 2013
- Árleysi árs og alda. Illustrations: Matthildur Margrét Árnadóttir. Guest authors: Erpur Eyvindarson a.k.a. Blaz Roca and Ewa Gaworska. This is a special hardcover gift version of Árlesi alda where new poetry has been added as well as new stanzas to the poems of 2013. Contains a music CD with 21 songs where various artists sing poems from the book. 12 of the 21 songs were composed specially the occasion. Producer of CD: Hilmar Örn Hilmarsson. Almenna bókafélagið: BF-útgáfa, 2014.

=== Music ===
- Helreið afa (music by Skálmöld, lyrics by Bjarki Karlsson), Vögguvísur Yggdrasils (track 5, disc 2) 2016. Also track 1 in Árleysi árs og alda.
- Árleysi árs og alda CD: For complete list of tracks, artists and composers, cf. IcelandicMusic.com: Árleysi árs og alda.

=== Original Poetry and Nursery Rhymes in illustrated children's books ===
The following books only contain poetry, no prose. Bjarki's texts replace the original texts, based on the illustrations, and should not be regarded as translations.

- Hafsteinn Hafsteinsson (author af narrative, illustrator) and Bjarki Karlsson (conversion of narrative to verse), Enginn sá hundinn. Reykjavík : Mál og menning, 2016
- Ástin mín, new text by Bjarki Karlsson. Illustrators and authors of poetry in the original version: Jo Ryan, Robyn Newton and Amy Oliver. Reykjavík: Unga ástin mín, 2016.
- Knús, new text by Bjarki Karlsson. Illustrator: Holly Jackman. Author of poetry in the original version: Natalie Boyd. Reykjavík: Unga ástin mín, 2016
- Mjá! Mjá! new text by Bjarki Karlsson. Illustrator: Holly Jackman. Author of poetry in the original version: Natalie Boyd. Reykjavík: Unga ástin mín, 2016
- Heiðrún Ýr, new text by Bjarki Karlsson. Illustrator: Chantal Renn. Authors of poetry in the original version: Nicoal Friggens, Natalie Munday and Anna Vallarino. Reykjavík: Unga ástin mín. 2017.
- Snati Már, new text by Bjarki Karlsson. Illustrator: Chantal Renn. Authors of poetry in the original version: Nicoal Friggens, Natalie Munday and Anna Vallarino. Reykjavík: Unga ástin mín. 2017.

=== Translations ===
Bjarki has translated some books, mostly books for toddlers, but also:

Poetry:

- Yahya Hassan, Yahya Hassan: ljóð, trans. by Bjarki Karlsson. Reykjavík: Mál og menning, 2014

Prose:

- Thiago de Moraes, Atlas goðsagna. Reykjavík: Bókafélagið, 2018.
- Frith, Alex and Louie Stowell (authors) and Matteo Pincelli (illustrations), Sögur úr norrænni goðafræði. Reykjavík: Rósakot, 2015.

== See also ==
- List of Icelandic writers
- Icelandic literature
