= Eiríksdóttir =

Eiríksdóttir is a surname. Notable people with the surname include:

- Freydís Eiríksdóttir (965 – ?), Icelandic explorer and colonist
- Hlín Eiríksdóttir (born 2000), Icelandic footballer
- Karólína Eiríksdóttir (born 1951), Icelandic composer
- Kristín Eiríksdóttir (born 1981), Icelandic poet and writer
