= Matthias Meisner =

German journalist and author

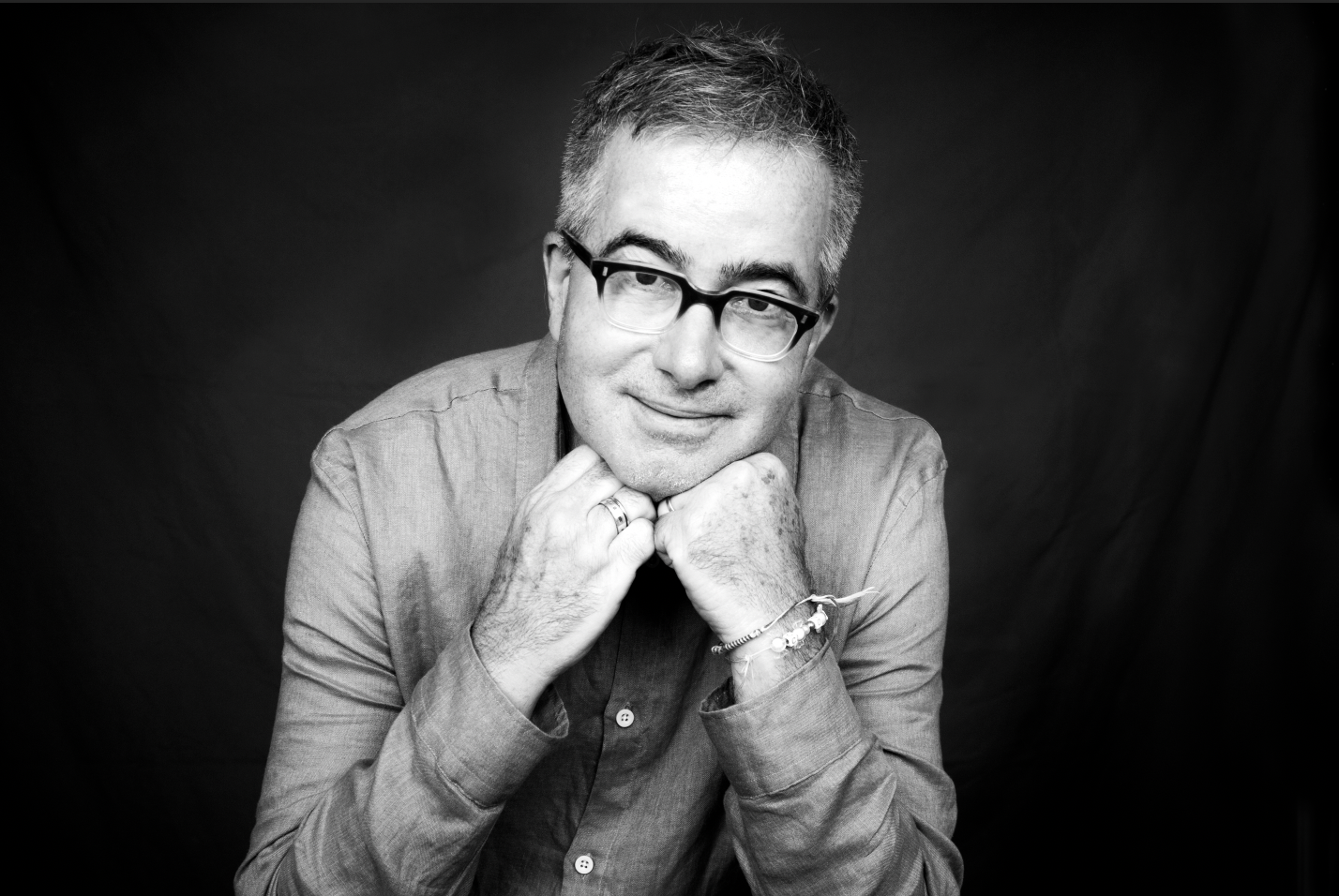
- Matthias Meisner 2025
- Born: July 22, 1961 (age 65); Frankfurt, Germany
- Occupation: Journalist

Matthias Meisner (born 22 July 1961, in Frankfurt am Main) is a German journalist and author. From 1999 to 2021, Meisner was an editor at the Berlin-based Tagesspiegel newspaper. Since 2021, he has been working as a freelance journalist, including for the taz newspaper.

== Early life ==
Matthias Meisner grew up in Langen, Hesse. In 1980, he graduated from high school at the Dreieich School in Langen. In the same year, he completed his one-year civilian service at the Dreieich Hospital in Langen. From 1980 to 1985, he worked as a freelance journalist, primarily for the Frankfurter Neue Presse. Meisner was co-founder of the youth magazine Du darfst, which was published in the district of Offenbach from 1982 onwards, and remained its editor-in-chief until 1985.

== Career ==
Meisner worked as a trainee at the Deutsche Presse-Agentur (dpa) from 1985 to 1987 and was then the agency's state political correspondent in Stuttgart. On July 1, 1990, he moved to Saxony and set up the dpa office in Dresden, which he headed until 1994. From 1994 to 1999, he was the federal political correspondent for the Sächsische Zeitung in Bonn.

From 1999 to 2021, Meisner was an editor at the Berlin-based Der Tagesspiegel newspaper. As a correspondent for this newspaper, he reported on domestic politics and the left-wing political spectrum, among other topics. He covered the Pegida demonstrations and the debate on German refugee policy in detail. He commented on his reporting on refugees, AfD, and Pegida, as well as on the role of social media in journalism, in various interviews, including for lügenpresse.de, Deutschlandfunk, and Mediendienst Ost.

The book Unter Sachsen. Zwischen Wut und Willkommen (Among Saxons: Between Anger and Welcome), co-edited by Meisner in 2017, provoked some fierce negative reactions from conservative and right-wing local politicians in Saxony.

From 2020 to 2023, Meisner was one of the columnists for the Dresden-based sea rescue organization Mission Lifeline.

In 2021, the Federal Ministry of the Interior of Germany delayed the publication of a special edition of the anthology co-edited by Meisner, Extreme Sicherheit. Rechtsradikale in Polizei, Verfassungsschutz, Bundeswehr und Justiz (Extreme Security: Right-wing Extremists in the Police, the Office for the Protection of the Constitution, the Armed Forces, and the Judiciary), in the series of publications on right-wing extremism by the Federal Agency for Civic Education (bpb). The ministry, led by Horst Seehofer, made the distribution of the book contingent on the bpb creating an online dossier on the topic, which was also to include an assessment of the government's actions since 2019. In 2022, he contributed as an author to the Zentrum Liberale Moderne's Gegneranalyse (Opponent Analysis) project. Since March 2024, Meisner has been writing for the Campact blog.

== Awards ==
In 2015, Meisner was nominated for the “Der lange Atem” (The long haul) journalism award by the Journalists' Association of Berlin-Brandenburg (JVBB) for his reporting on Pegida.

In February 2016, he was awarded third place in the “Journalists of the Year” competition in the “Regional Reporter” category for his reporting on refugee policy.

In 2016, he was awarded second prize in the Wächterpreis der deutschen Tagespresse (German Daily Press Watchdog Award) for his reporting on Pegida and the anti-asylum movement in Saxony.

== Publications ==
- Ungarn. Ein politisches Reisebuch (in German). VSA-Verlag. 1989. ISBN 3-87975-503-5.
- Dresden zu Fuß. 18 Stadtteilrundgänge durch Geschichte und Gegenwart (in German). VSA-Verlag. 1991. ISBN 3-87975-567-1.
- Unter Sachsen. Zwischen Wut und Willkommen. Ch. Links Verlag. 2017. ISBN 978-3-86153-937-7.
- Ständige Ausreise. Schwierige Wege aus der DDR (in German). Ch. Links Verlag. 2019. ISBN 978-3-96289-059-9.
- Extreme Sicherheit. Rechtsradikale in Polizei, Verfassungsschutz, Bundeswehr und Justiz (in German). Verlag Herder. 2019. ISBN 978-3-451-38561-2.
- Fehlender Mindestabstand. Die Coronakrise und die Netzwerke der Demokratiefeinde (in German). Herder. 2021. ISBN 978-3-451-39037-1.
- Staatsgewalt. Wie rechtsradikale Netzwerke die Sicherheitsbehörden unterwandern (in German). Verlag Herder. 2023. ISBN 978-3-451-39596-3.
- Mut zum Unmut. Eine Anleitung zur politischen Widerspenstigkeit (in German). Verlag J.H.W. Dietz Nachf. Bonn. 2025. ISBN 978-3-8012-0707-6.
