= John Robison (inventor) =

Scottish inventor and writer on scientific subjects

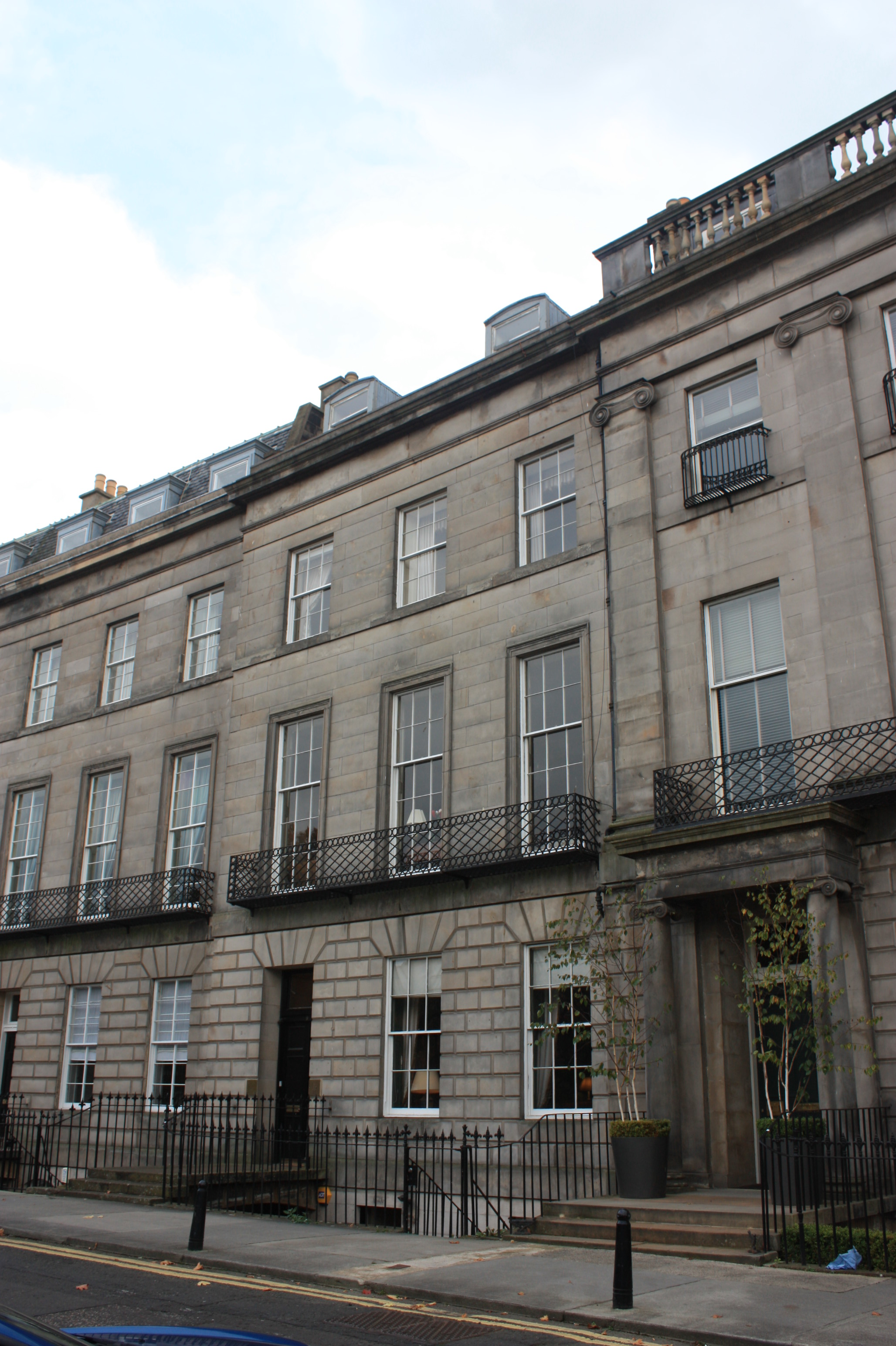
John Robison's house at 9 Atholl Crescent in Edinburgh

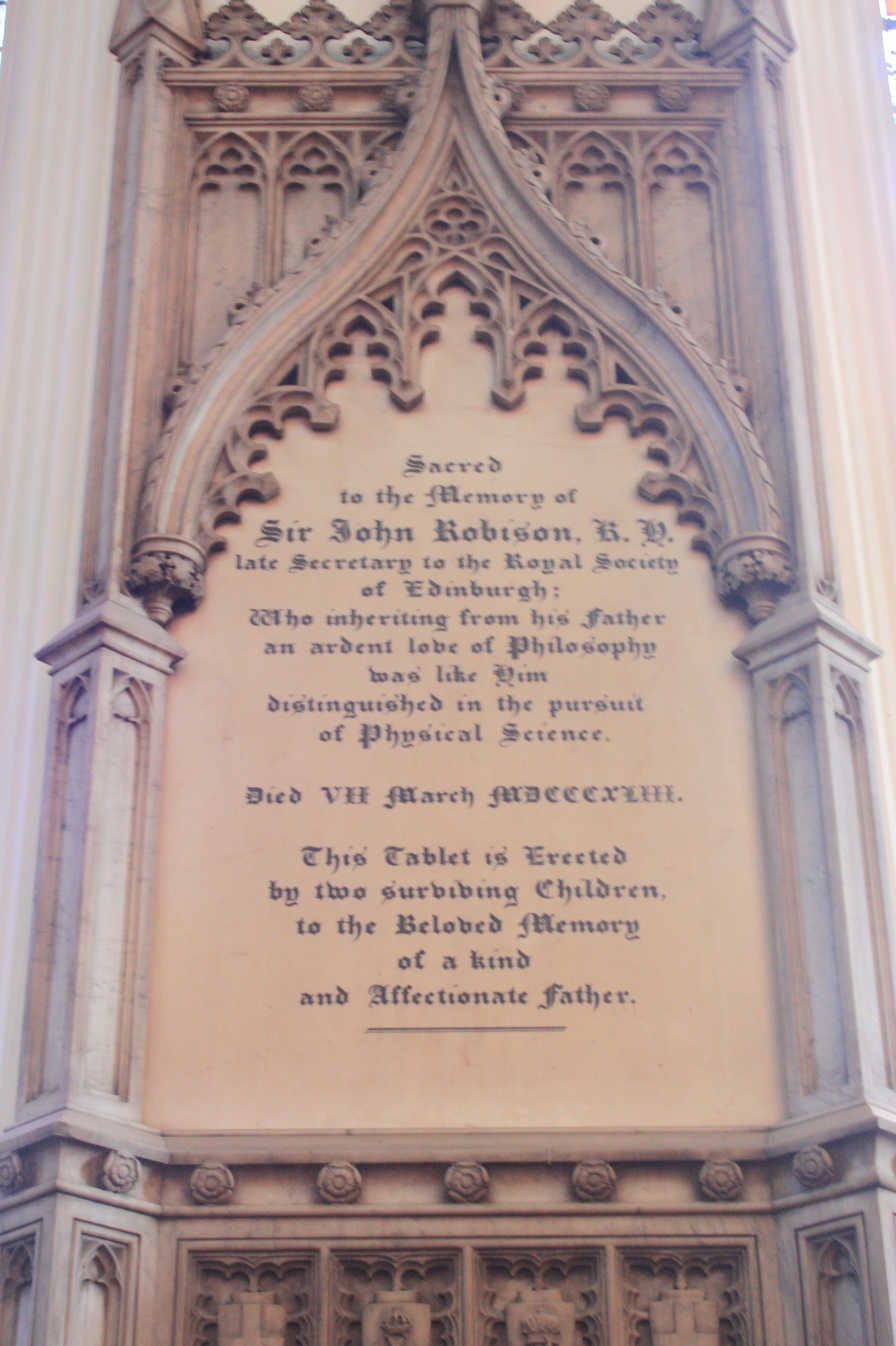
Memorial to Sir John Robison, St John's Episcopal Church, Edinburgh

Sir John Robison KH FRSE FRSSA (11 June 1778 – 7 March 1843) was a Scottish inventor and writer on scientific subjects. He was the son of the physicist and mathematician, Professor John Robison.

== Life ==
He was born in Edinburgh on 11 June 1778, the son of Rachel Wright and John Robison.

=== Education and first job ===
Robison was educated at the High School in Edinburgh and then studied at the University of Edinburgh. Around 1795 he entered the cotton-spinning industry, first in Paisley and then moving south to Manchester.

=== Hyderabad, India ===
In 1802 he entered the service of Nizam of Hyderabad as a contractor for the establishment and maintenance of military service. He left India a wealthy man, in 1815.

=== Edinburgh ===
In 1816 he was elected a Fellow of the Royal Society of Edinburgh and served as its General Secretary from 1828 to 1840. His proposers were John Playfair, David Brewster and James Jardine.

In 1821, with David Brewster he jointly founded the Scottish Society of Arts. He served as its Secretary from foundation until 1824, Vice President 1828-9 and 1833–4, and as President 1841–2.

In the 1830s he is listed as living at 9 Atholl Crescent, a large townhouse in Edinburgh's west end.

=== Law Enforcement ===
From 1834 he was the Edinburgh Commissioner of Police.

He received the Guelphic Order in 1837 from William IV and knighted in 1838. He founded the Royal Scottish Society of Art in 1841 and served as its first President.

=== Death ===
He died at his final house in Edinburgh, 13 Randolph Crescent, on 7 March 1843. A memorial exists to Sir John Robison on the south wall of St John's Episcopal Church in Edinburgh a few hundred yards east of his house.

== Notable Inventions ==
see

- Tapered wood screws (1829)
- Pneumatic cheese press (1830)
- Furniture casters (1835)
- Improved gas cooker (1839)
- Improved gas lighting (1839)
- Improved camera lucida (1841)
- Machine for creating curved files (1842)

== Family ==
He married twice, firstly in 1816 to Jean Grahame who died in 1824 and secondly to Miss Benson who died in 1837. His granddaughters were the novelists Emily Gerard (1849-1905) and Dorothea Gerard (1855-1915).
