= Sins (miniseries) =

1986 American TV series

- 2011 DVD cover
- Based on: Sins by Judith Gould
- Screenplay by: Laurence Heath
- Story by: Judith Gould
- Directed by: Douglas Hickox
- Starring: Joan Collins; Timothy Dalton; Jean-Pierre Aumont; Marisa Berenson; Steven Berkoff; Joseph Bologna; Judi Bowker; Élizabeth Bourgine; Capucine; Neil Dickson; Arielle Dombasle; James Farentino; Paul Freeman; Allen Garfield; Giancarlo Giannini; Lauren Hutton; Gene Kelly; Catherine Mary Stewart; William Allen Young
- Theme music composer: Francis Lai
- Country of origin: United States
- Original language: English
- No. of episodes: 3

Production
- Executive producers: Joan Collins; Peter Holm
- Producer: Steve Krantz
- Production locations: New York City; Paris; Studios de Billancourt - 50 Quai du Point du Jour, Boulogne-Billancourt, Hauts-de-Seine, France; Venice, Veneto, Italy
- Cinematography: Jean Tournier
- Running time: 320 minutes
- Production companies: The Greif-Dore Company; Collins-Holm Productions; New World Pictures

Original release
- Network: CBS
- Release: February 2 – February 4, 1986

Sins is a 1986 CBS television miniseries starring Joan Collins. An adaptation of the 1982 novel of the same name by Judith Gould, it is the story of a woman who survives the horrors of the Nazi occupation of France and endures a succession of challenges as she rises in the world of fashion.

Produced by New World Television with a budget of $14 million, Collins also served as executive producer with her then-husband Peter Holm, and the miniseries contained 85 costume changes for her role (reportedly a record for a single production); Collins retained all of her costumes after filming as part of her contract. Carly Simon co-wrote and performed the theme song, "It's Hard to Be Tender".

== Plot ==
Helene Junot is a successful businesswoman and a leading name in the world of fashion. In 1980s New York, she attends a reception for the launch of her new magazine, Woman Of Today, which could make or break her publishing company. Meanwhile, several people from Helene's past are conspiring to destroy her.

In France during World War II, 13-year-old Helene is raped and brutalized at the hands of the Gestapo (led by the sadistic Nazi commander, Karl Von Eiderfeld) after they murder her pregnant mother, caught sending messages for the Allied Forces. Though Helene is later rescued by French Resistance fighters, her younger brother and sister, Edmund and Marie, are deported to a concentration camp. In 1949, with the war over, Helene goes to work as a dressmaker with her aunt at the grand home of the Count and Countess De Ville. There, she begins to show her talents as a fashion designer and also is wooed by the Count's son, Hubert. However, Hubert's parents do not approve of him seeing a "servant girl", which ends their romance.

In 1955, Helene moves to Paris and begins working for leading fashion designer Odile as a model. Odile soon makes Helene a director at her fashion house. In 1959, Helene meets and falls in love with American army officer David Westfield when he is visiting Paris, but their affair is short-lived when David is transferred to Vietnam and is killed in action. At the same time, Helene has hired an investigator named Otto Mueller, as she wants to find her brother and sister and the Gestapo commander responsible for the death of her mother years earlier. However, the search will be costly, and Helene agrees to become the mistress of the abusive Count De Ville (Hubert's father) in order to finance her search, much to Hubert's dismay and humiliation. Mueller succeeds in finding Helene's brother Edmund, now a grown man but living in a mental institution in a permanently catatonic state after years of torture and abuse at the hands of the Nazis. Helene takes him home with her and hires a doctor and a nurse to bring him back to health.

Helene also meets American composer Eric Hovland, an older man with whom she falls in love and later marries. However, their marriage is short-lived when Hubert De Ville, still obsessed with Helene, breaks into their home and tries to rape her. When Eric tries to protect her, Hubert murders him, but threatens to use his family connections to blame Helene for the crime if she reports him. Helene reluctantly agrees and tells the police it was an accident, but then discovers that the incident and their conversation afterwards had been taped as Eric was recording music at his piano at the time. She then blackmails the De Villes for 100 million francs, or she will have Hubert arrested for murder and destroy their family's reputation. Count De Ville reluctantly agrees and Helene uses the money to begin her own fashion magazine, Couture. However her victory over the De Villes is bittersweet as she finds out she is pregnant with Eric's child, but miscarries and learns she can never have children because of an injury she sustained after being raped by the Nazis during the war. Soon after, Mueller informs Helene that he has tracked down the ex-Nazi commander Von Eiderfeld, who is now a wealthy businessman living in Austria. Helene and Edmund have him prosecuted as a Nazi war criminal and he is sentenced to life imprisonment, but vows to have revenge on Helene.

In the 1960s, Helene then throws herself into her work and Couture becomes a huge success, while Edmund marries his nurse, Jeanne. However, when she is pregnant with their first child, Jeanne becomes ill. The baby is born prematurely and Jeanne dies, leaving Edmund to raise their daughter, Natalie, alone. Meanwhile, Helene meets Italian publisher Marcello D'Itri, who tries to secure a loan from her to save his floundering fashion magazine. Helene offers to buy his magazine, on the condition that it is renamed Couture Italiana, but with Marcello kept on as editor-in-chief, to which he agrees. But while she is in Venice, Helene runs into David, who had not died in Vietnam as reported and has been trying to find her for years. Now a U.S. congressman, David asks Helene to marry him. David's mother does not approve of their engagement, feeling that Helene's somewhat chequered past will taint David's future career. Also knowing that she cannot give David children, Helene reluctantly breaks off their engagement. Some years later in the 1970s, Helene's empire has expanded and she hires American architect Steve Bryant, and his jealous wife Zizi, to design and build a new skyscraper in New York named the Junot Tower. Steve falls in love with Helene, much to Zizi's annoyance, but their relationship remains platonic.

In 1982, at a fancy dress ball in Venice to mark the 50th issue of Couture Italiana, Helene learns that Marcello has been embezzling from the magazine behind her back, and she forces him to resign. At the party, Helene once again meets David, who is now a married U.S. senator. Moments later, Hubert arrives at the ball to gloat that Von Eiderfeld was released from prison that day. Some time later, Helene finally begins a relationship with Steve, but when Zizi finds the two of them together, Steve suffers a heart attack and dies, for which Zizi blames Helene.

A couple of years later, Helene's enemies Von Eiderfeld, Hubert, Marcello and Zizi join forces in a conspiracy to destroy her. Helene has launched a new magazine, Woman Of Today, but has taken out huge loans and sold off a large amount of stock in her company, Junot Publications, in order to finance it. When the first issue is a failure, Helene's enemies buy up large portions of the stock between them. They also manage to lure Helene's long-time editorial associate, Luba Tcherina, away from her, while bribing her banker, Adam Gore, into calling in her outstanding loans so that she will become bankrupt. However, Marcello and Zizi are not content to merely ruin Helene, they want to kill her and hire a hitman with an attack dog to mutilate her. Helene's enemies are foiled, first when her banker Gore is exposed for fraud and commits suicide, saving Helene from bankruptcy, and then when an attempt on her life fails. Her enemies then turn on themselves, and in an ensuing struggle, Zizi shoots and kills Von Eiderfeld. Meanwhile, Helene has gained precious time to relaunch her new magazine, this time with her talented niece Natalie at the helm. The second issue is a huge success, but not before Helene is shot by the hitman who was hired to kill her as he attempts to carry out his contract. However, she is only wounded and survives, while David kills the hitman. After Helene recovers, David divorces his wife and he and Helene later marry. Finally finding true happiness, Helene decides to hand her publishing empire over to Natalie to run.

== Cast ==
Actor	Role
Starring
Joan Collins	Helene Junot
Jean-Pierre Aumont	Count De Ville
Marisa Berenson	Luba Tcherina
Steven Berkoff	Major Karl Von Eiderfeld
Joseph Bologna	Steve Bryant
Élizabeth Bourgine	Jeanne
Judi Bowker	Natalie Junot
Capucine	Odile
Neil Dickson	Hubert De Ville
Arielle Dombasle	Jacqueline Gore
James Farentino	David Westfield
Paul Freeman	Mueller
Allen Garfield	Adam Gore
Giancarlo Giannini	Marcello D'itri
Lauren Hutton	ZZ Bryant
Gene Kelly	Eric Hovland
Catherine Mary Stewart	Young Helene Junot
William Allen Young	Jacques Danvers
Timothy Dalton	Edmund Junot
Also starring
Féodor Atkine	Chameleon
Faith Brook	Julie Westfield
John McEnery	Defense Lawyer
Régine	Madame Liu
Alexandra Stewart	Countess
Peter Vaughan	Chief Prosecutor

== Production ==
Adapted from the 1982 novel Sins by Judith Gould, the teleplay was written by Laurence Heath. The miniseries was produced by, among others, Collins and her then-husband Peter Holm. Directed by Douglas Hickox, Sins was filmed in 1985 at Studios de Billancourt in Paris, and on location in France, Italy, and New York. Many of Collins' costumes were designed by Valentino.

== Broadcast and reception ==
The seven-hour miniseries was broadcast in three parts on CBS starting on February 2, 1986. It did well in the ratings, where an estimated 72 million people watched it. Jon Corry of The New York Times called Sins "a very pretty production" and "a hymn to consumerism." He wrote:

Sins isn't improbable or unlikely; it's something grander than that: preposterous, say, or absurd. At the same time it's not really about what it's supposed to be about; it's really about Joan Collins and her Valentino clothes ... they wear one another ... Sins isn't good, great or uplifting television; it's just television. Actually, it's like the star herself. She is a professional, although we don't expect to see her as one of Chekhov's three sisters. We don't want to, either.

An episode of the hit ABC series Growing Pains entitled "Reputation", which was also originally telecast in February 1986, made multiple indirect references to the miniseries, including the audio of a faux television advertisement and the reading aloud of a fictitious listing description in TV Guide.

Some retrospective reviewers consider Sins to be emblematic of the campy excesses of 1980s-era television, with Collins playing a "superhuman version of the sort of tough-as-tacks heroine Joan Crawford used to play in her Hollywood heyday," and the lavish production design being described as the "aesthetic apex" of melodramatic miniseries.

== Home media ==
Sins was released on home video in the 1980s and 90s, and released on DVD in the UK (as a 3-disc set) in 2003. Although the miniseries was originally shown in three parts, the DVD has the version shown on syndicated television and is split into seven episodes of varying lengths (between 30 minutes and 55 minutes each). Only the first episode includes the opening credit sequence. The DVD "special features" consist of written profiles for Joan Collins, Timothy Dalton, Marisa Berenson, Jean-Pierre Aumont, and Joseph Bologna, as well as a photo gallery section and weblinks for Collins and Dalton.

The DVD was released in the US in 2011. This edition was a 2-disc set and retains the miniseries' originally broadcast format as three episodes, though there are no bonus features.

In July 2024 cast member Arielle Dombasle, who had played Jacqueline Gore, uploaded the series on YouTube.
