= Wächterpreis der Tagespresse =

The Wächterpreis der Tagespresse, or Guard Prize of the Daily Press, is a German journalism prize awarded for excellence in investigative reporting. The prize was first given in 1969. Winners are selected by a four-person jury, and the prize is awarded by Germany's Freedom of the Press foundation (Freiheit der Presse). With the exception of 1970, the prize has been given every year with a first, second, and third place.

Topics for which the prize has been given include political misconduct and malfeasance, human rights violations, organized crime, abuse of confidential data, public health issues, and more.

Recipients include Anton-Andreas Guha, Hans Leyendecker, and Angela Böhm.
