= Anna Genover-Mas =

Catalan journalist and writer

Anna Genover-Mas (born 1963) is a Catalan writer. She started to write adventure novels for children and young adults. She won the Vicenta Ferrer Vila de Paterna prize for the best children's literature book of 2007.

Genover-Mas was born in Girona in 1963. She studied journalism (BA, with Honors, Universitat Autònoma de Barcelona (UAB)) and worked freelance for Spanish TV. Later she did cinema studies at NYU (postgrad in Cinematography) and Screenwriting at UCLA.

She now lives between Barcelona and Sant Feliu de Guíxols

Her first YA novel has been translated into English. The Grumpy Gardener (Catalan: La Jardinera Rondinaire), an ecological adventure, was published in April 2008. The prize-winning El broc màgic and El tresor de Pakamotu and "La predicció del mussol" are published in catalan.

She wrote her first novel for adults in 2024: Mandronius.
