= Sindri Freysson =

Icelandic novelist and poet

Sindri Freysson (born 23 July 1970 in Reykjavík) is an Icelandic novelist and poet.

His first book, a collection of poems entitled Fljótið sofandi konur (The River Sleeping Women), was published in 1992. His first novel, Augun í bænum (The Town has Many Eyes) received the Halldór Laxness Literature Prize in 1998, and his second book of poetry, Harði kjarninn (The Hard Core), subtitled Spying on my own life, was nominated for the Icelandic Literary Prize in 1999. Sindri's first book for children, Hundaeyjan (The Island of Dogs) (2000), illustrated by Halla Sólveig Þorgeirsdóttir, was originally written for Sindri's daughter.

His second novel, Flóttinn (The Escape), a vivid account of the adventures and perils that a young German faces in Iceland during World War II, was published in 2004 to a critical success. His third novel, Dóttir mæðra minna (Daughter of My Mothers) was published in 2009. In October 2011 Sindri Freysson received the 2011 Reykjavík City Poetry Prize for his book Í klóm dalalæðunnar (Prisoner of the Ground-Mist).His fourth novel, Blindhríð (Whiteout), was published to a critical acclaim in November 2013, and was nominated for the DV Cultural Prize for Literature and the Icelandic Red Feather-award for writing.
