= Kristín Eiríksdóttir =

Icelandic poet and writer (1981)

Kristín Eiríksdóttir (born 1981) is an Icelandic poet and author. Kritstín's debut novel, Kjötbærinn ('Meat Town') was published in 2004. This was followed by Húðlit auðnin ('Skin-Coloured Wasteland') in 2006 and Annarskonar sæla ('A Different Sort of Bliss') in 2008.

Her first two books were a mixture of poetry and prose while her third was entirely poetry. She was one of the winners of the Bókmenntaverðlaun starfsfólks bókaverslana with her 2014 book Kok ('Throat'). Her novel, Elín, ýmislegt ('A Fist or a Heart'), won the Icelandic Literary Prize and was shortlisted for the 2019 Nordic Council Literature Prize.

== Bibliography ==
- Kjötbærinn (Meat Town) (2004) ISBN 9979774819
- Húðlit auðnin (Skin-coloured Wasteland) (2006) ISBN 9979971584
- Annarskonar sæla (A Different Sort of Bliss) (2008) ISBN 9935110095
- Doris deyr (Doris Dies) (2010) ISBN 9935111407
- Hvítfeld: Fjölskyldusaga (2012) ISBN 9935113094
- Kok (Throat) (2014) ISBN 9935114597
- Elín, ýmislegt (A Fist or a Heart) (2017) ISBN 9789935118189
