= Sigurbjörg Þrastardóttir =

Icelandic writer (born 1973)

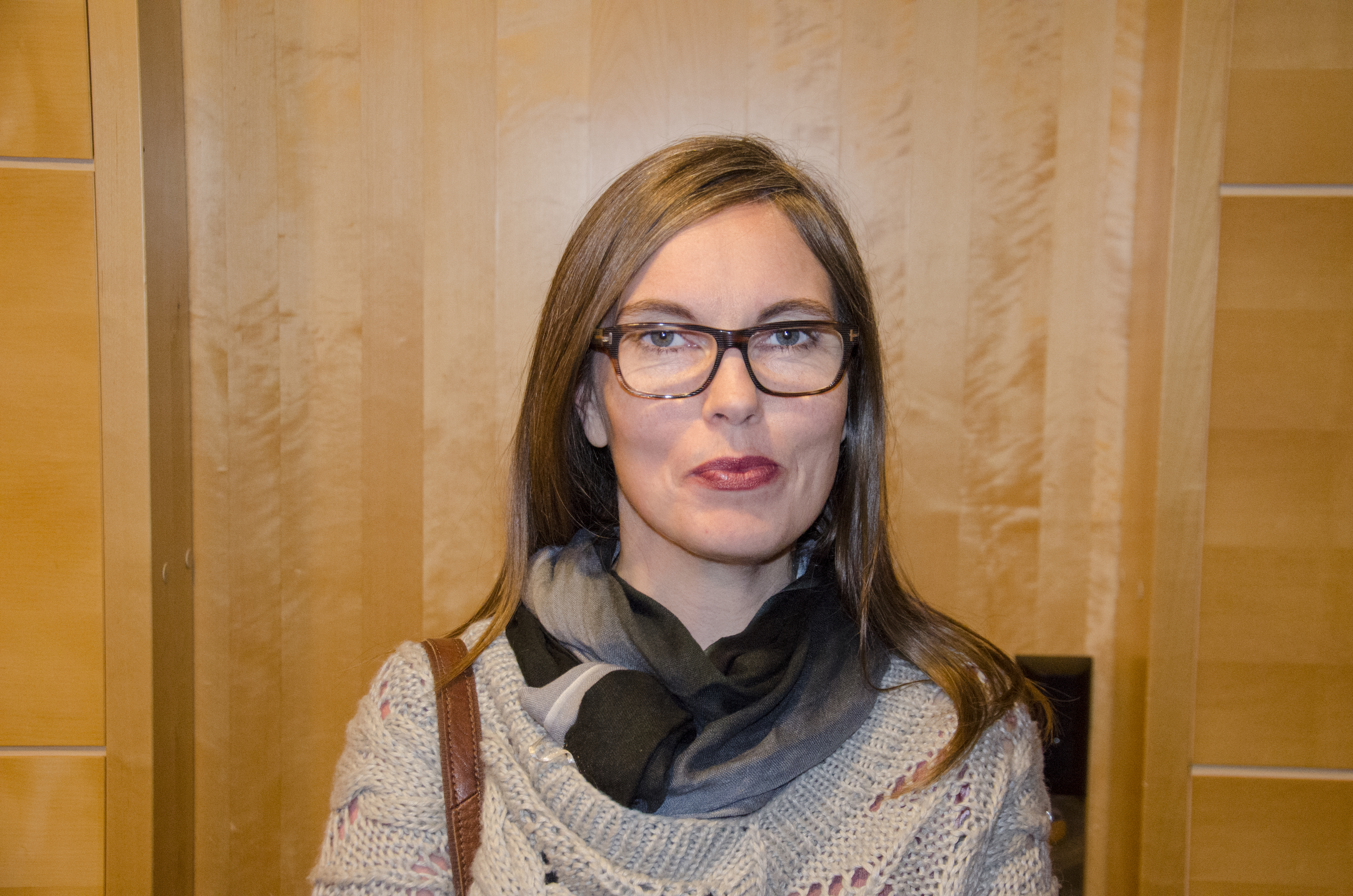
- Born: 27 August 1973 (age 53); Akranes, Iceland
- Writing career
- Genres: poetry, novel

Sigurbjörg Þrastardóttir (born 27 August 1973) is an Icelandic writer.

She was born in Akranes and received a BA in comparative literature and a degree in journalism and mass communications from the University of Iceland. She subsequently worked for the newspaper Morgunblaðið for a number of years, including writing a column for Lesbók, a weekly cultural supplement.

In 1999, she published her first book Blálogaland ("Land of Blue Flames"), a collection of poetry. In 2002, she published a novel Sólar saga ("The Story of Sól"); it received the Tómas Guðmundsson Literature Award. In 2012, she published a second novel Stekk ("Jump"). Her poetry has been translated into twelve languages. Part of her play Seven Women Murdered at a Sauna was read at the Reykjavík City Theatre as part of the Reykjavík Arts Festival.

Her poetry collection Hnattflug ("Circumnavigation") was named best book of poetry in 2000 by the staff of Icelandic book stores. In 2008, Her poetry book Blysfarir ("Torching") was given the Fjöruverðlaunin women´s literature award and, in 2009, was nominated for the Nordic Council's Literature Prize. In 2010, the poetry collection Brúður ("Bride") was nominated for the DV cultural award. In January and February 2003, she was named official poet of the Reykjavík City Library. She was artist in residence at the International Artists Villa Concordia in Bamberg Germany during winter 2011-12.
