= Emily Gerard =

Scottish writer (1849–1905)

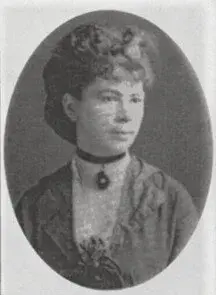
- Emily Laszowska, born Emily Gerard.
- Born: 7 May 1849; Chesters, Jedburgh, Scotland
- Died: 11 January 1905 (aged 55); Vienna, Austria
- Occupation: writer
- Spouse: Ritter Miecislaus von Laszowski
- Writing career
- Language: English
- Notable works: The Land Beyond the Forest: Facts, Figures, and Fancies from Transylvania

Signature
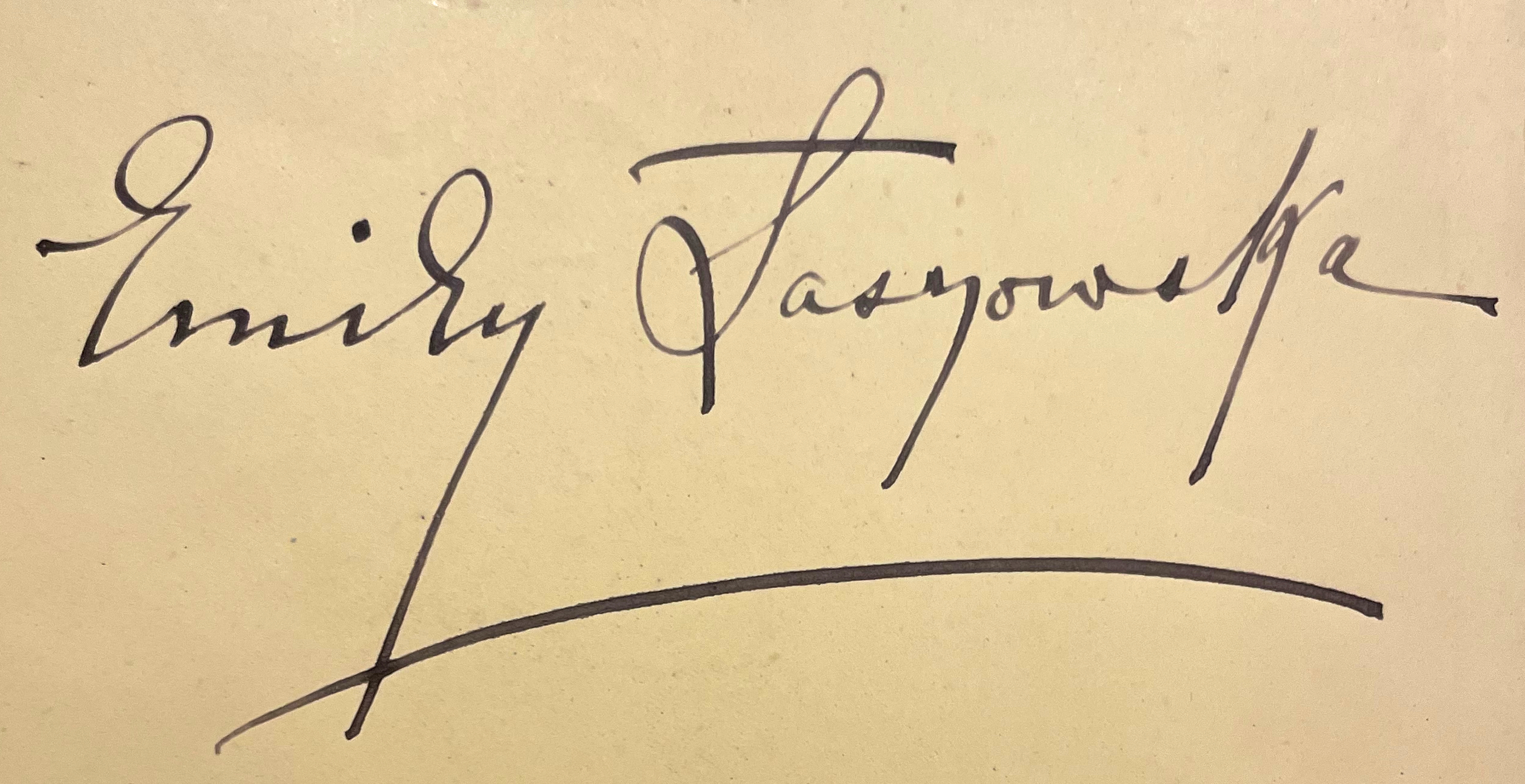

Emily Gerard (7 May 1849 – 11 January 1905), later Emily Laszowska, was a 19th-century Scottish author best known for the influence her collections of Transylvanian folklore had on Bram Stoker's 1897 novel Dracula.

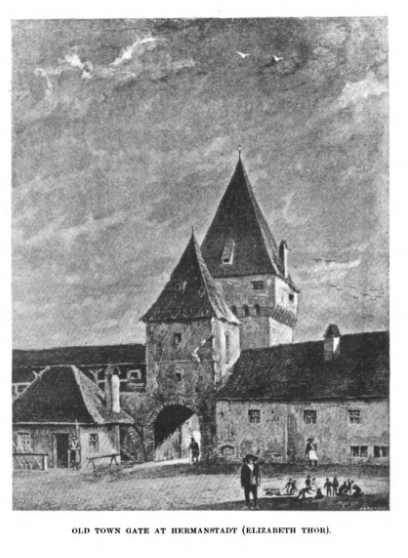
Frontispiece to The Land Beyond the Forest (1888) by Emily Gerard, illustrated by Elizabeth Thor

== Life ==
=== Early life ===
Emily Gerard was born on 7 May 1849 at Chesters, Jedburgh, Scotland, the oldest daughter of Colonel Archibald Gerard (1812–80) of Rochsoles, Lanarkshire and Euphemia Erskine (1818–70), daughter of the inventor Sir John Robison (1778–1843). She had three sisters and three brothers including General Sir Montagu Gilbert Gerard (1842–1905). She was descended from Alexander Gerard (1728–95) a philosophical writer, Archibald Alison (1757–1839) a Scottish Episcopalian minister and writer, and Gilbert Gerard (1760–1815) a minister of the Church of Scotland and theological writer. Her sister Dorothea, born on 9 August 1855 at New Monkland, Lanarkshire, was also a novelist.

In the 1861 Scotland Census, Gerard is recorded as living at Rochsoles House in Lanarkshire with her parents, her sisters Anne, Dorothea, and Mary, and a staff of 11 servants; they also have several visitors happening to stay at the house at the time of the census-taker's visit. The Gerard family lived in Vienna from 1863 to 1866, during which time Emily began a life-long friendship with Princess Marguerite de Bourbon, whose family had been friends with the Robisons since the Scottish exile of Marguerita's great-grandfather, Charles X. She was home-schooled until she was 15, when she continued her education studying European languages at the convent of the Sacré Coeur at Riedenburg in Austria for three years. The family background was originally Scottish Episcopalian, and when their mother converted to Catholicism in 1848, the sisters were raised Catholic.

== Career ==
The two sisters Dorothea and Emily became active participants in the British literary community in the latter half of the 19th century, both working collaboratively and independently. Emily Gerard wrote stories for Blackwood's Magazine, as well as reviewing French and German literature for The Times and Blackwood's.

=== Collaboration with Dorothea ===
In 1879, Gerard began to write novels, with her first major work being a collaboration with her sister Dorothea under the joint pseudonym E. D. Gerard. Reata; or What's in a Name (1880) concerned a Mexican girl's attempts to adapt to European customs and was published in Blackwood’s Magazine. Subsequent novels published by the pair in the same magazine were Beggar My Neighbour (1882), The Waters of Hercules (1885), and A Sensitive Plant (1891). When Dorothea got married and moved, their collaboration ceased. As Dorothea (Gerard) Longard de Longgarde (1855–1915), arguably the more successful and certainly the more prolific novelist of the two, had married an Austro-Hungarian officer, she spent much of her subsequent life in Austria.

==== Impact of marriage ====
In Salzburg on 14 October 1869, Gerard married Ritter Miecislaus von Laszowski (Polish: Mieczysław Łaszowski), a Polish cavalry officer serving in the Austro-Hungarian Army, who was 20 years her senior. She had two sons. She was joined by her sisters in 1870, following the death of their mother. As a result of their marriages, the sisters' subsequent novels were often set in Eastern Europe. The Gerard brothers also made contributions to the siblings' literary output, collectively adding up to nearly 60 books and novels. Both brothers were considered sufficiently noteworthy to be listed alongside Emily Gerard in Black's Who Was Who, 1897–1916 (1953). Subsequent to her marriage, she was variously referred to as Emily Gerard, Mrs de Laszowska, Emily Laszowska, or Emily de Laszowska Gerard.

=== Independent writing ===
Gerard's novels frequently centred around European characters and settings. She used her time spent in Hermannstadt and Kronstadt to write about the culture and landscape of Transylvania. Her familiarity with Transylvanian folklore came about as a result of her husband being stationed in the towns of Hermannstadt and Kronstadt from 1883 to 1885. Her book The Land Beyond the Forest (1890) and essay "Transylvania Superstitions" is credited with inspiring Bram Stoker to write Dracula. The latter publication also introduced Stoker to the term "Nosferatu" to describe the undead.

Gerard writes:

More decidedly evil is the nosferatu, or vampire, in which every Roumanian peasant believes as firmly as he does in heaven or hell. There are two sorts of vampires, living and dead. The living vampire is generally the illegitimate offspring of two illegitimate persons; but even a flawless pedigree will not insure any one against the intrusion of a vampire into their family vault, since every person killed by a nosferatu becomes likewise a vampire after death, and will continue to suck the blood of other innocent persons till the spirit has been exorcised by opening the grave of the suspected person, and either driving a stake through the corpse, or else firing a pistol-shot into the coffin. To walk smoking round the grave on each anniversary of the death is also supposed to be effective in confining the vampire. In very obstinate cases of vampirism it is recommended to cut off the head, and replace it in the coffin with the mouth filled with garlic, or to extract the heart and burn it, strewing its ashes over the grave. That such remedies are often resorted to even now is a well-attested fact, and there are probably few Roumanian villages where such have not taken place within memory of the inhabitants. There is likewise no Roumanian village which does not count among its inhabitants some old woman (usually a midwife) versed in the precautions to be taken in order to counteract vampires, and who makes of this science a flourishing trade.

Elements from this passage, including the local peasants' suspicions of the vampire, obviously appear in the first part of Dracula.

==== Friendship with Mark Twain ====
In 1897 Gerard wrote to William Blackwood, of Blackwood's Magazine, asking to be introduced to the American author Mark Twain. When Blackwood obliged, Gerard met and befriended Mark Twain, to whom The Extermination of Love (1901) is dedicated. In a letter to Blackwood, Gerard wrote of Mark Twain that he was "an excessively serious, almost solemn person...but when one can get him in the right vein he is quite fascinating."

== Death ==
On 11 January 1905 Gerard died in Vienna, Austria where she and her husband had moved following his retirement from active service. She was buried two days later. Her sister Dorothea moved to Austria following the death of her husband and lived the rest of her life as a recluse, dying on 29 September 1915.

== Literary criticism ==
During her lifetime, Gerard was regarded as something of a travel writer with a vast and privileged experience of European countries and expert linguistic abilities. In an 1888 review of her work in Salt Lake City's Women's Exponent, Gerard was described as "a clever writer and the author of several entertaining novels [who] must be rather cosmopolitan in her tastes." In A. S. Levetus's 1905 piece for Womanhood entitled "What Women are Doing in Austria," she writes, "[Emily Gerard] possesses a fertile imagination and a lively and convincing way of conveying her thoughts to others, a rich gift of language, enhanced by her acquaintances with foreign tongues, all of which she speaks and writes with the same fluency as her native tongue."

However, it was felt that other members of Gerard's family appealed more to the public as writers of novels. In 1905 obituaries for Gerard published in both The Times and The Atheneum, her sister's Dorothea's wider appeal was remarked upon. The Times observed that Emily "had not won equal popularity with that of her sister," while The Atheneum decided she was in her own right, "a capable novelist, with an excellent gift for telling a story."

== Works ==
- Reata; or What's in a Name, Edinburgh and London: William Blackwood and Sons, 1880.
- Beggar My Neighbour, Edinburgh and London: William Blackwood and Sons, 1882.
- The Waters of Hercules, Edinburgh and London: William Blackwood and Sons, 1885.

(these first three novels are all under the name "E.D. Gerard" – a collaborative pen name of Emily and her sister Dorothea Gerard)

- "Transylvanian Superstitions." The Nineteenth Century Vol.18, (1885) p. 128–144
- The Land Beyond the Forest: Facts, Figures, and Fancies from Transylvania (New York: Harper & Brothers, 1888).
- Bis (1890)
- A Secret Mission (1891)
- A Sensitive Plant (1891) (as "E.D. Gerard" in collaboration with Dorothea Gerard.)
- The Voice of a Flower (1893)
- A Foreigner; An Anglo-German Study (1896)
- An Electric Shock (1897)
- Tragedy of a Nose (1898)
- The Extermination of Love: A Fragmentary Study in Erotics (Edinburgh and London: William Blackwood and Sons, 1901)
- The Heron's Tower: A Romance (1904)
- Honour's Glassy Bubble, A Story of Three Generations (1906) (Posthumously published.)

Aside from the collaborations, she was most commonly identified as "E. Gerard" on the title pages of these works.

== Sources ==
- Heiss, Lokke. "Madame Dracula: The Life of Emily Gerard." Journal of the Fantastic in the Arts, 10 (1999): 174–186.
- Black, Adam and Charles Black. Who Was Who, 1897–1916, 4th ed., v. 1, London: Adam and Charles Black, [1920] 1953: p. 270–271.
- Katarzyna Gmerek (2005). "Emily i Dorothea Gerard – nieznane pisarki szkockie w Polsce" (PDF). pp. X-4-c.
- Eccles, Charlotte O'Conor (21 February 1899). "University of Notre Dame Archives Calendar". p. 13.
- Michie, Christopher Young,The Practice of Forestry, Edinburgh and London: William Blackwood and Sons, 1888: p. 10 of Blackwood Catalog section.
- New General Catalog of Old Books and Authors
- Teuceanu, Radu, "Un Occidental Despre Transilvania: Jane Emily Gerard, The Land beyond the Forest, 1888." Brukenthal. Acta Musei, I. 1 (2006): 243–251.
