= Ófeigur Sigurðsson =

Icelandic poet, novelist and translator

Ófeigur Sigurðsson is an Icelandic poet, novelist and translator. He was born in Reykjavík on 2 November 1975.

Ófeigur studied philosophy at the University of Iceland and graduated in 2007, writing a thesis on the work of Georges Bataille. In 2001 he published his first book of poetry, Skál fyrir skammdeginu, with the avant-garde press Nykur. Ófeigur has to this date published seven books of poetry, four novels and several translations.

Ófeigur was the first Icelander to be awarded the European Union Prize for Literature in 2011 for the novel Jon. In 2014 he published the novel Öræfi [Oraefi: The Wasteland] to critical acclaim as well as great commercial success, it was the third best selling book of the year with five printings selling out in three months. It went on to receive the Book Merchant's Prize in 2014 and The Icelandic Literature Prize in 2015.

His works have been widely translated and Oraefi: The Wasteland was released in the United States in March 2018. Ófeigur currently lives in Reykjavik, Iceland.
