= Judith Gould =

American pseudonymous novelist

Rhea Gallaher
- Born: Rhea Gallaher; May 2, 1945; Tennessee, United States
- Died: January 25, 2025 (aged 79)
- Occupation: Novelist
- Writing career
- Pen name: Judith Gould
- Period: 1982–2008
- Genre: Romance
- Website: www.judithgould.com

Nicholas Peter Bienes
- Born: Klaus Peter Peer; January 9, 1952; Leoben, Austria
- Died: August 11, 2012 (aged 60)
- Occupation: Novelist
- Writing career
- Pen name: Judith Gould
- Period: 1982–2008
- Genre: Romance
- Website: www.judithgould.com

Judith Gould is a fictional American writer of romance novels, and was the pseudonym used by co-authors Nicholas Peter "Nick" Bienes and Rhea Gallaher. Gould is a New York Times bestselling author whose books were translated into 22 languages.

In addition to being writing partners, Bienes and Gallaher were also involved romantically. They lived together for many years at the Hotel Chelsea in New York City, later moving to Valatie in upstate New York.

== Biographies ==
=== Nicholas Peter Bienes ===
Nick Bienes was born on January 9, 1952, in a small town in Austria, and baptized Klaus Peter Peer. After his biological father died he was adopted by his aunt, who had married a U.S. serviceman, and consequently he was renamed Klaus Peter Bienes. He lived in Austria, Yugoslavia, Germany and the United States. He was a native speaker of both German and English. He died on 11 August, 2012.

=== Rhea Gallaher ===
Rhea (pronounced Ray) Gallaher was born on May 22, 1945. He grew up in Harriman, Tennessee (a small town near Knoxville, Tennessee). He died on January 25, 2025.

== Bibliography as Judith Gould ==
=== Single novels ===
- Sins, 1982/Nov (adapted into the 1986 miniseries Sins, starring Joan Collins)
- Dazzle, 1989/May
- Never Too Rich, 1990/Oct
- Forever, 1992/Jun
- Too Damn Rich, 1993/Jun
- Till The End Of Time, 1998/Dec
- Rhapsody, 1999/Nov
- Time To Say Goodbye, 2000/Aug
- A Moment In Time, 2001/Aug
- The Best Is Yet To Come, 2002/Aug
- The Greek Villa, 2003/Oct
- The Parisian Affair, 2004/Oct
- Dreamboat, 2005/Oct
- The Secret Heiress, 2006/Oct
- Greek Winds of Fury, 2008/Dec

=== Love-makers Trilogy ===
1. The Love-Makers, 1985
2. The Texas Years, 1989/Jan
3. Second Love, 1997/Nov
