= Anton-Andreas Guha =

German journalist and novelist

Anton Andreas Guha (1 April 1937, in Cinobaňa – 7 or 8 February 2010, in Frankfurt am Main) was a German journalist and author.

== Life ==
Shortly after his birth, his family moved to Frauenau in the Bavarian Forest. Together with his brother, he graduated from high school in Regensburg. He studied German, History and English at Erlangen, and later sociology and psychology in Frankfurt am Main.

In 1967, after an encounter with Karl Gerold, he began working as an editor at the Frankfurter Rundschau, where he was responsible for South America and Security Policy.

His telephone conversations with Thomas Schwätzer (Max Watts) were intercepted during 1973 by the US Secret Services as part of Project Penguin Monk. In December 1977, he was offered a position in the planning department of the Bonn Chancellery where he learned that for years he had been subjected to surveillance by the German authorities.

In 1978 he received the Wächterpreis der Tagespresse, a German journalism award for excellence in investigative reporting, for his discovery that travelers who were found carrying literature considered left-wing extremist were being detained by the border police. He also questioned whether public libraries were also being subject to censorship by the authorities.

He was a critic of the security and defense policy of NATO and of the German Federal Government. A number of works of nuclear holocaust fiction appeared in 1983, and Guha published his Ende: A Diary of the Third World War.

== Quotes ==
"Only boundless naivety could assume that these Euro-strategic weapons systems could have been developed without concrete and definite military-political ideas about their use."

== Partial bibliography ==
- The neutron bomb, or, The perversion of human thought (1978)
- Nicaragua, the United States and the Somoza family
- The retrofitting of the Holocaust in Europe (1981)
- Ende: A diary of the Third World War (1983)
- America: The Risky Partner (1984)
- Shield or weapon? The strategic defense initiative (SDI) and the consequences for Europe (1986)
- Unstrung research: The consequences of a science without ethics (1987)
- The Gulf War, the peace movement and "anti-Americanism" (1991)
- The Soviet Union: A world power of chaos (1991)
- The planet strikes back: A diary from the future (1993)
- Death In The Twilight Zone: Is Europe Still Defended?
- The Enemy We Need, or, Must There Be War?

A full list of articles appears on the German Wikipedia page.
