= Dorothea Gerard =

Scottish-born novelist and romance-writer

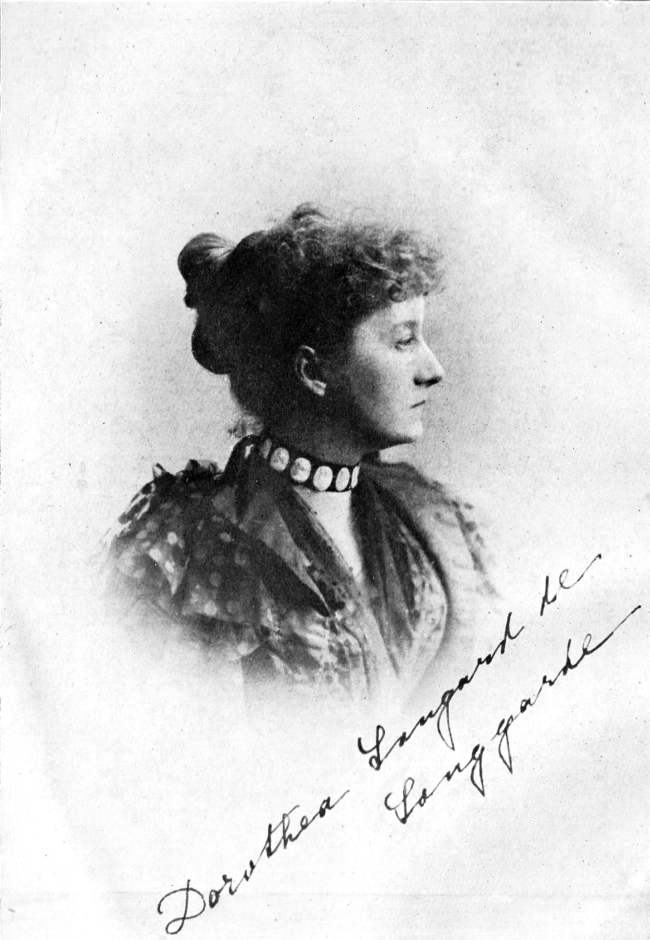
Dorothea Gerard Longard de Longgarde

Dorothea Mary Stanislaus Gerard (Mme Longard de Longgarde, 9 August 1855 – 29 September 1915) was a Scottish-born novelist and romance-writer who often wrote about controversial and unconventional subjects and "whose general conservatism co-existed with a piercing eye for relations across national and ethnic divides, for antisemitism and other forms of prejudice." At first she wrote for pleasure with her less prolific older sister Emily Gerard but later carved an independent career publishing about forty books between 1890 and 1916 mostly for Tauchnitz editions signifying her target audience was mainly English-speaking visitors travelling in Europe.

== Early life ==
Dorothea Gerard was born in 1855 at Rochsoles House in New Monkland, Lanark, Scotland, the youngest daughter of Colonel Archibald Gerard (1812–1880) of Rochsoles, Lanarkshire, and Euphemia Erskine née Robison (1818–1870), the oldest daughter of the renowned inventor Sir John Robison (1778–1843). She had three sisters and three brothers including General Sir Montagu Gilbert Gerard (1842–1905). Dorothea Gerard was also descended from Alexander Gerard (1728–1795) a philosophical writer, Archibald Alison (1757–1839) a Scottish Episcopalian minister and writer, and Gilbert Gerard (1760–1815) a minister of the Church of Scotland and theological writer. Her sister Emily Gerard born in 1849 at Chesters, Jedburgh, Roxburghshire, Scotland was also a novelist, and the two collaborated on several novels. The family background was originally Scottish Episcopalian, but when their mother converted to Catholicism in 1848 her children were raised as Catholic.

In the 1861 Scotland Census, Dorothea is recorded as living at Rochsoles House in Lanarkshire with her parents, her sisters Anne, Emily and Mary, and a staff of 11 servants; they also have several visitors happening to stay at the house at the time of the census-taker's visit. The Gerard family lived in Vienna from 1863 to 1866. Dorothea was home-schooled until the death of her mother in 1870 at which time her older and now married sister Emily assumed custody of her and Dorothea joined her sister in Austria where she continued her education studying European languages at the convent of the Sacré Coeur at Riedenburg in Austria.

The two sisters Dorothea and Emily became active participants in the British literary community in the latter half of the nineteenth century, both working collaboratively and independently.

== Collaboration with Emily Gerard ==
In 1877 Dorothea began to write novels, with her first major work being a collaboration with her sister Emily Gerard under the joint pseudonym E. D. Gerard. Reata; or What's in a Name (1880) concerned a Mexican girl's attempts to adapt to European customs and was published in Blackwood’s Magazine. Three subsequent novels published by the pair in the same magazine were Beggar My Neighbour (1882), The Waters of Hercules (1885), and A Sensitive Plant (1891). Referring to one of their joint novels, The Saturday Review called them "one of the most fascinating of our lady novelists."

== Marriage and after ==
On 12 April 1887 at Marburg Dorothea Gerard married Captain (later Major-General) Julius Longard of the 7th Austrian Lancers in the Austro-Hungarian Army following which she spent much of her subsequent life in Austria and Galicia in Eastern Europe where she also set many of her novels, many of which involved romantic liaisons between European nobility. Following her marriage Gerard feared losing her native tongue and read and wrote in English as much as possible. In 1894 her husband was awarded the title 'Longard de Longgarde'. Together they had a daughter, Dorothée Stanislaw Julia (1888–1943). Following her marriage her collaboration with her sister Emily ceased and Dorothea Gerard became successful as a writer of novels in her own right, including Recha, Etelka's Vow and A Queen of Curds and Cream. Her tale 'My Nightmare', from her book of short stories On The Way Through (1892), has been anthologised several times in collections of Victorian horror and suspense. As Dorothea Longard de Longgarde she became arguably the more successful and certainly the more prolific novelist of the two sisters, so much so that in 1893 she was interviewed for 'Portraits of Celebrities at Different Ages' in The Strand Magazine.

Dorothea Gerard died after a long illness aged 60 in September 1915 in Vienna where she had been living in strict retirement for some years. She was buried in the family vault at the Vienna Central Cemetery.

== Works ==
=== As E. D. Gerard with her sister Emily Gerard ===
- Reata; or What's in a Name, Edinburgh and London: William Blackwood and Sons, 1880.
- Beggar My Neighbour, Edinburgh and London: William Blackwood and Sons, 1882.
- The Waters of Hercules, Edinburgh and London: William Blackwood and Sons, 1885.
- A Sensitive Plant, 3 vols., Kegan Paul, London, 1891.

=== As D. Gerard ===
- Lady Baby: A novel, Leipzig: Tauchnitz 1890
- Recha, Edinburgh, London: Blackwood 1890.
- Orthodox, Leipzig: Tauchnitz 1891.
- On the Way Through and Other Tales, London 1892.
- A Queen of Curds and Cream, Leipzig: Heinemann and Balestier 1892.
- Etelka's Vow: A novel, London 1892.
- The Rich Miss Riddell, Edinburgh: Blackwood 1894.
- Lot 13, D. Appleton and Company, New York 1894.
- An Arranged Marriage, D. Appleton and Company, New York 1895.
- The Wrong Man, Leipzig: Tauchnitz 1896.
- A Spotless Reputation, Leipzig: Tauchnitz 1897.
- The Impediment: A novel, New York: D. Appleton and Company 1898.
- A Forgotten Sin Leipzig: Tauchnitz 1898.
- Things That Have Happened, London 1899.
- One Year, Edinburgh: Blackwood 1899.
- The Conquest of London, New York: Buckles 1900.
- The Supreme Crime, Leipzig: Tauchnitz 1901
- The Blood-Tax: A Study in Militarism, Leipzig: Tauchnitz 1902.
- Holy Matrimony, Leipzig: Tauchnitz 1902, London Methuen 1902
- The Eternal Woman, Leipzig: Tauchnitz 1903.
- The Three Essentials, Leipzig: Tauchnitz 1905.
- Sawdust – A Romance of the Timberlands, Philadelphia, Chicago: Winston 1905.
- The Improbable Idyl, Leipzig: Tauchnitz 1905.
- A Glorious Lie, Leipzig: Tauchnitz 1905.
- The Tree Essentials, Leipzig: Tauchnitz 1905
- The House of Riddles, London: Hutchinson 1906.
- The Compromise, Leipzig: Tauchnitz 1906. (2 volumes)
- Itinerant Daughters, London: John Long 1907.
- The Red-Hot Crown – A Semi-Historical Romance, London: John Long 1909.
- The Grass Widow, Leipzig: Tauchnitz 1910. (also London: John Long 1910 and 1914)
- The City of Enticement, Leipzig: Tauchnitz 1912.
- Miss Providence, D. Appleton & Co., New York, London, 1912.
- The Unworthy Pact, Leipzig: Tauchnitz 1913
- Exotic Martha, Leipzig: Tauchnitz 1913.
- The Austrian Officer at Work and at Play, Smith, Elder & Co, London 1913
- The Inevitable Marriage, London: John Long 1915.
- Passion and Faith, London: S. Paul 1915.

=== In German ===
- Loot Your Neighbour. Roman Cologne: Bachem o. J. (Beggar My Neighbour)
- A Forgotten Sin. Stuttgart: Engelhorn 1900
- The Blood Tax. Leipzig: Schmidt & Günther 1904.
- Restitution. Leipzig: Tauchnitz 1908.
- K. u. K. officers: Serious and Cheerful from before the World War, Brunswick, Hamburg: Westermann 1916 (posthumously)
- The City of Enticement. Graz, Wien, Leipzig: Kienreich 1919. (posthumously)
