= Þórdís Gísladóttir =

Icelandic writer and translator

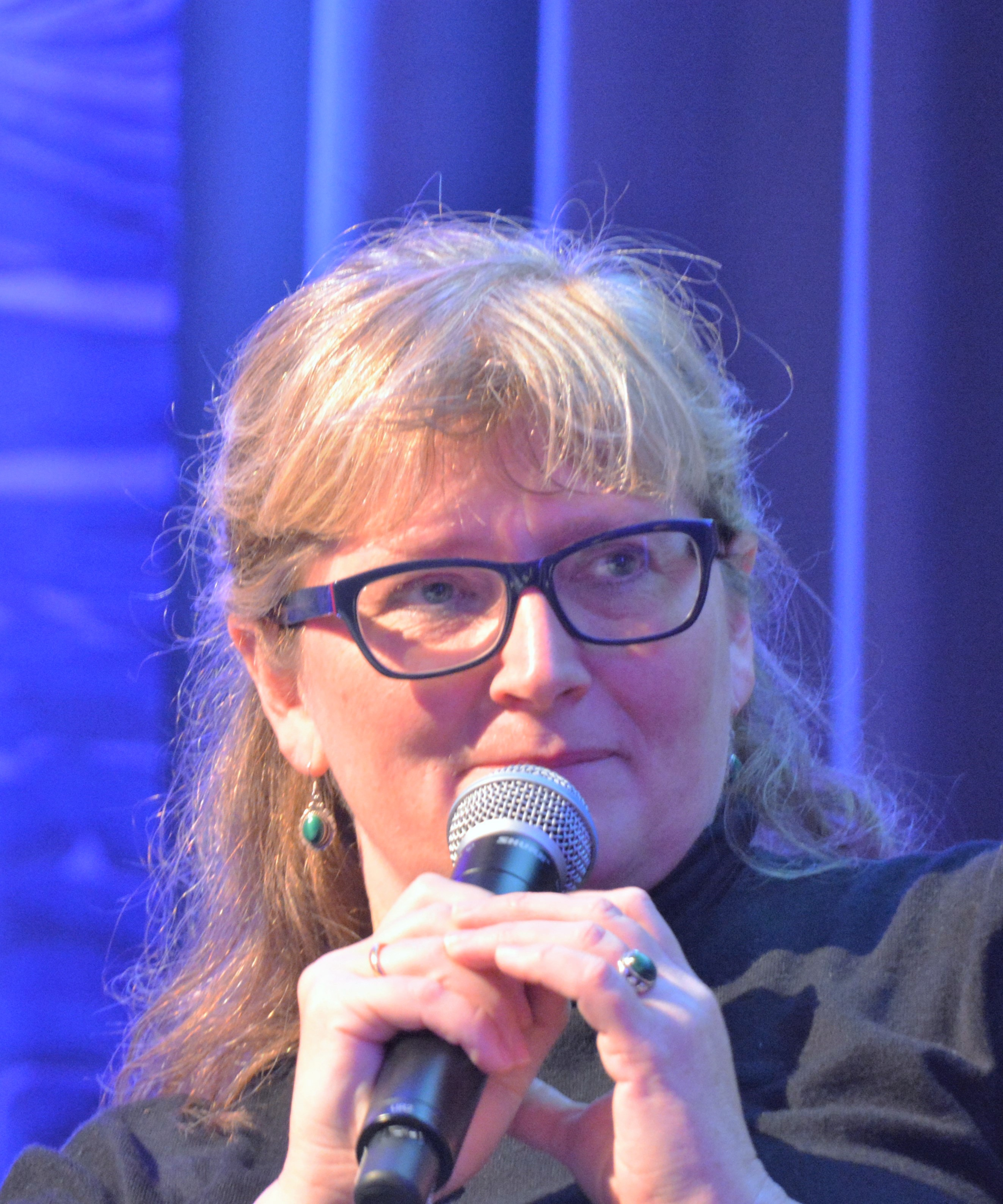
'Þórdís Gísladóttir on the Gothenburg Book Fair, 2016

Þórdís Gísladóttir, also Thordis Gisladottir, (born 14 July 1965) is an Icelandic children's book author, poet, novelist and a translator.

She is known for her children's stories about Randalin and Mundi and her poetry has also been well received. Þórdís has worked as a project manager and university teacher at the University of Iceland and the Uppsala University in Sweden, been a web editor for the Nordic Council and she has translated 17 books and a play for the Reykjavik City Theater, edited a journal about children's literature, written about literature for the Norwegian newspaper Klassekampen and made radio programs for The Icelandic National Radio. In 2010 Þórdís Gísladóttir received the Tómas Guðmundsson Award for her first poetry work Leyndarmál annarra ("Secrets of Others"). Her second book of Poetry, Velúr (2014) and her children's books Randalín, Mundi og afturgöngurnar (2015) and Doddi - bók sannleikans (2016), coauthored with Hildur Knútsdóttir, were nominated for the Icelandic literature prize. Her fourth book of poetry Óvissustig (2016) was nominated for The May Star (Maístjarnan), a poetry award given by The Icelandic Writers' Union and The National and University Library of Iceland for the best poetry book of the year.

== Biography ==
Þórdís studied language and literature at the University of Iceland. She is noted for her children's stories about Randalín and Mundi which earned her the Icelandic Women Literature Prize in 2013. and the Booksellers Prize and the third book, Randalin, Mundi og afturgöngurnar was nominated for the Icelandic Literary Award. She also has a degree in bilingual studies from Uppsala University in Sweden. In 2010, she received the Tómas Guðmundsson Award for her poetry work Leyndarmál annarra ("Secrets of Others"). It provides guidance to those who are interested in investigating what goes on behind the neighbour's curtains, revealing the unexpected sides of domestic life. Her next book of poetry, Velúr (Velvet), presents verses with a soft, often sensual texture delving into the past or into the world of fantasy.

Randalín og Mundi ("Randalín and Mundi") is a lively, humorous work for children, providing answers to questions such as "Who lives in a box and swallows a mouse every Sunday?" The story continues in Randalín og Mundi í Leynilundi ("Randalin and Mundi in the Secret Garden") when the two friends leave town for a few days, meeting strange people and interesting but fearful creatures.

Þórdís Gísladóttir has also translated a number of books by various Swedish authors, among them Henning Mankell, Linda Boström Knausgård, Kristian Lundberg, Lena Andersson and Ingmar Bergman. She has also worked at an advertising agency and been the editor for the children's cultural journal Börn og menning.

== Selected works ==
- 2010: Leyndarmál annarra
- 2012: Randalín og Mundi
- 2013: Randalín og Mundi í Leynilundi
- 2014: Velúr
- 2015: Tilfinningarök
- 2015: Randalín, Mundi og Afturgöngurnar
- 2016: Doddi - bók sannleikans
- 2016: Óvissustig
- 2017: Doddi - ekkert rugl
- 2019: Randalín, Mundi og leyndarmálið
- 2019: Mislæg gatnamót
- 2020: Hingað og ekki lengra!
- 2020: Ljóð 2010-2015
- 2021: Nú er nóg komið!
- 2024: Aðlögun
