= Tómas Guðmundsson =

Icelandic writer

Tómas Guðmundsson (6 January 1901 – 14 November 1983) was an Icelandic writer. He was known as Reykjavík's poet (Reykjavíkurskáldið, skáld Reykjavíkur).

Tómas's parents were Steinunn Þorsteinsdóttir and Guðmundur Ögmundsson, living at Efri-Brú in Grímsnes. He soon got in touch with literature and poetry. He read Icelandic sagas, Jónas Hallgrímsson's poems and more. He also started to write his own poetry at a young age.

== Career ==
He moved to Reykjavík and studied at Menntaskólinn í Reykjavík, there he got in touch with many authors, including Halldór Laxness (they formed a close friendship during the M.R. years), Guðmundur G. Hagalín and Davíð Stefánsson. Tómas graduated from M.R. in 1921.

He then studied law at Háskóli Íslands and graduated in 1926. During that time he got in touch with even more authors, including Jón Thoroddsen junior.

After his graduation he opened an office to practise law and in 1928 he started working at Hagstofa Íslands. He closed his office in 1929 and quit the bureau in 1943.

From 1943 he mostly worked at poetry and authorship. He was one of the editors of the literary magazines Helgafell and Nýja Helgafell, and also translated stories, plays and poems.

== Death ==
Tómas died 1983 in Reykjavík, aged 82.

== Legacy ==
Since 1994, the city of Reykjavík has made an award in memory of Tómas called the Bókmenntaverðlaun Tómasar Guðmundssonar (the Tómas Guðmundsson literature award).

A statue of Tómas by the sculptor Halla Gunnarsdóttir was unveiled in 2010 at the southern end of the Tjörnin, a lake in Reykjavík centrum.

== Works ==
Tómas's poems were mostly traditional and his style did not change much during his career. The poems are mostly about Reykjavík and his place of youth.

The first three books he published, Við sundin blá, Fagra veröld and Stjörnur vorsins belong to neoromanticism and so do his last two books, Fljótið helga and Heim til þín, Ísland, but its signs are not as strong.

== Publications ==
- 1925: Við sundin blá, poems
- 1933: Fagra veröld, poems
- 1940: Stjörnur vorsins, poems
- 1950: Fljótið helga, poems
- 1953: Ljóðasafn, poems
- 1977: Heim til þín, Ísland, poems
