= Elín Ebba Gunnarsdóttir =

Icelandic writer (born 1953)

Elín Ebba Gunnarsdóttir is an Icelandic writer born in 1953. She is noted for her short fiction.

Her publications include Sumar sögur : smásögur (Some Stories, Vaka-Helgafell, 1997: ISBN 9789979865254) and Ysta brún : smásögur (On The Edge, Vaka-Helgafell, 1999: ISBN 9789979214137).

Her Sumar sögur was translated into German by Karl-Ludwig Wetzig and published as Jener Sommer in Island (2000, Suhrkamp: ISBN 9783518121634).

Her story "Solmundur" was included in Gerd Schmidt Nielsen's 1999 collection Nordiske noveller i 1990'erne (Nordic short stories in the 1990s, Systime, 1999: ISBN 9788761601100).
