= Syneresis =

Syneresis (also written 'synæresis' or 'synaeresis') could refer to:

- Synaeresis, contraction of two vowels into a diphthong
- Syneresis (chemistry), extraction or expulsion of a liquid from a gel
- Syneresis cracks, cracks formed in mudstone by changes in the salinity of water
