= Shallow water marine environment =

Marine environment between the shore and the continental shelf

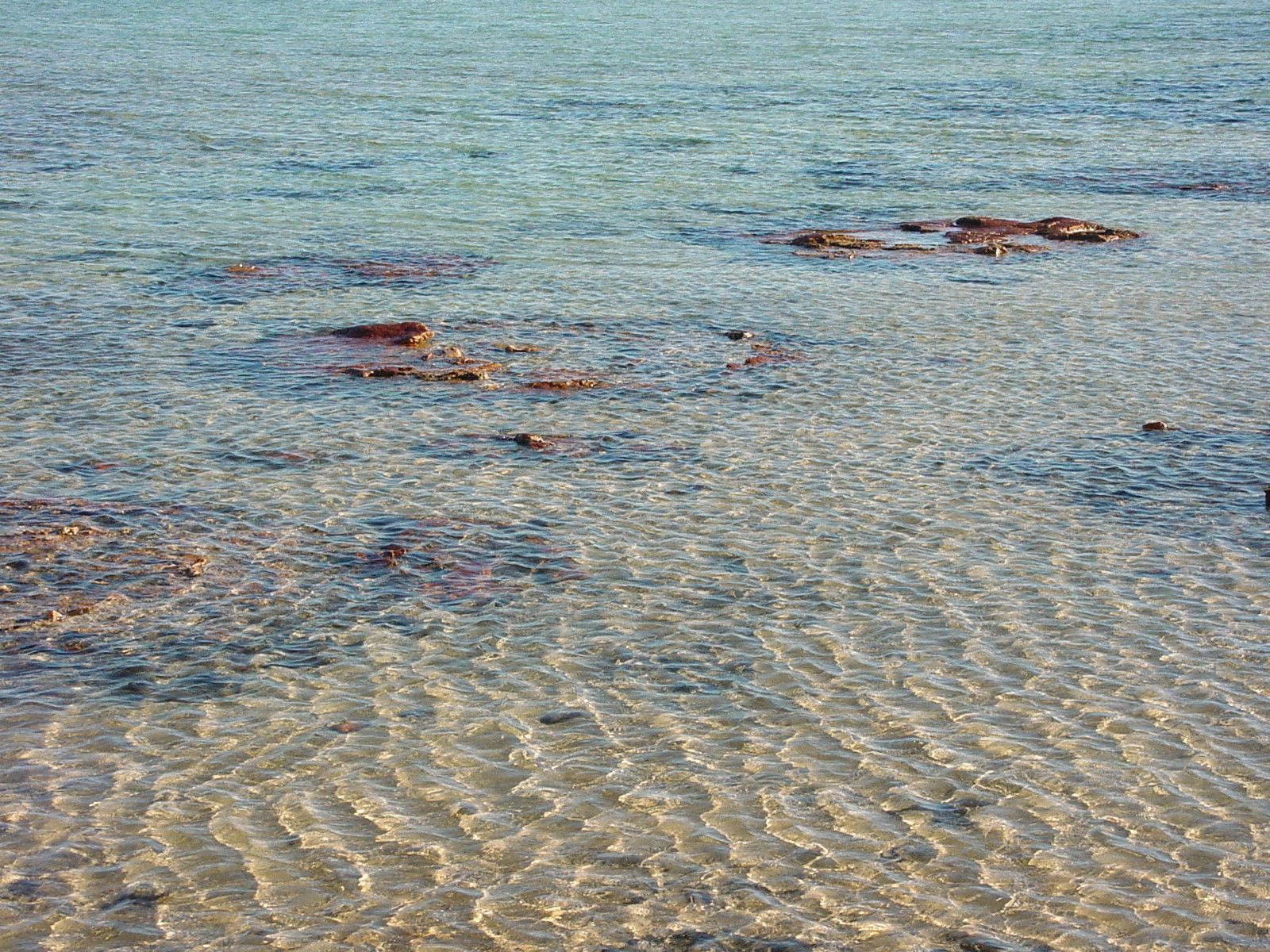
Shallow water

Shallow water marine environment refers to the neritic marine environment between the shore and the shelf break. This environment is characterized by oceanic, geological and biological conditions, as described below, and water in this environment is shallow and clear, allowing the formation of different sedimentary structures, carbonate rocks, coral reefs, and allowing certain organisms to survive and become fossils.

== Sediment ==
The sediment itself is often composed of limestone, which forms readily in shallow, warm, calm waters. While siliciclastic and carbonaceous sediments can coexist, shallow marine environments can also contain only one or the other. Shallow water marine sediment primarily features larger grain sizes because smaller grains have washed out to deeper water. Within carbonaceous sedimentary rock, evaporite minerals such as gypsum, anhydrite, and halite may be present; these are the most common evaporite minerals found within modern and ancient deposits and can occur as crystalline layers, isolated crystals, or clusters of crystals.

Approximately 75% of surface sediments are in shallow-marine environments, representing most Phanerozoic and Precambrian sedimentary rock. This is visible in the North American and Caribbean regions. However, shallow marine sediment quantity varies significantly over geologic time due to supercontinent breakup and shifting tectonic plate processes.

== Sedimentary structures ==
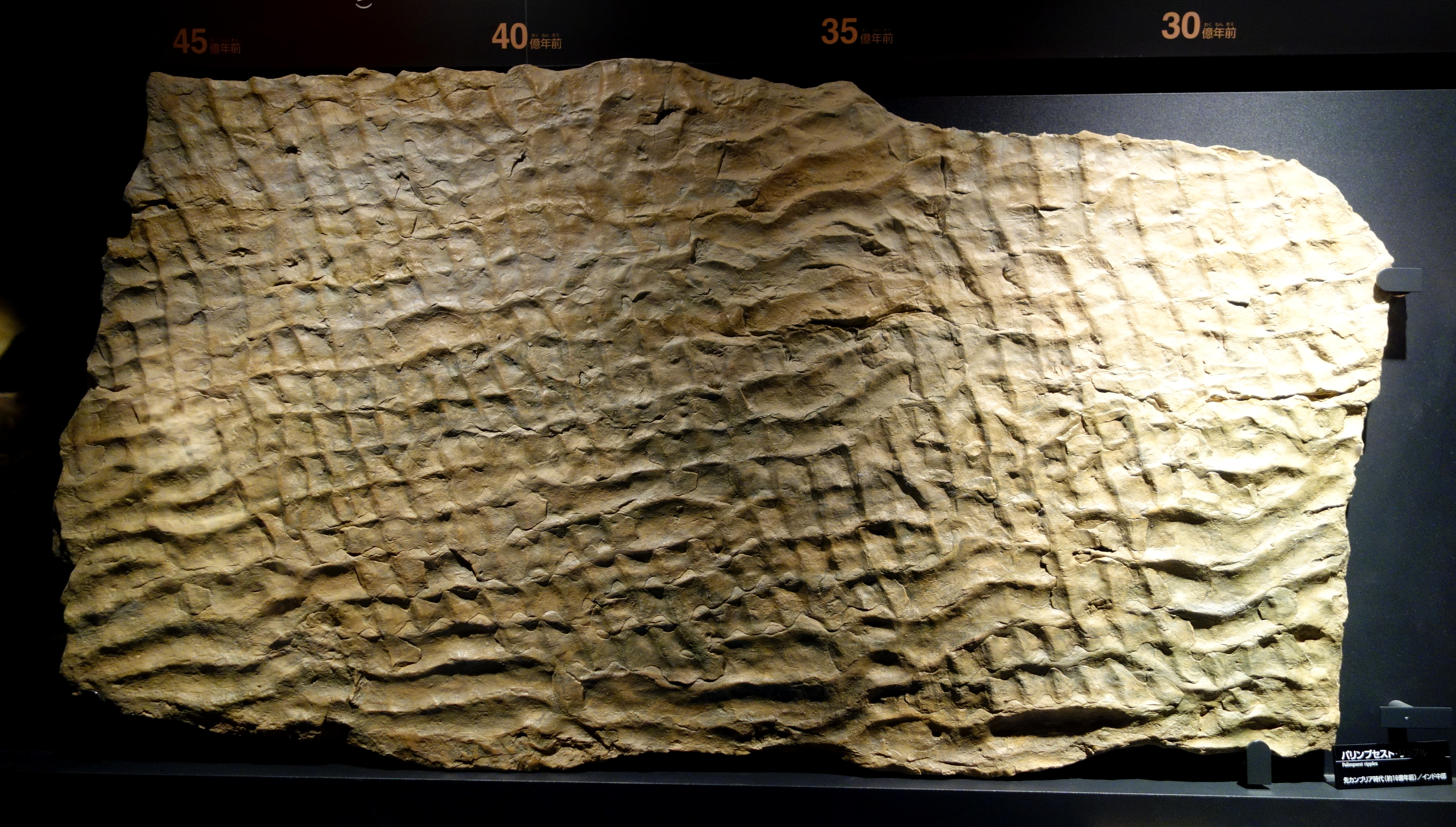
Palimpsest ripples – National Museum of Nature and Science, Tokyo

=== Shallow marine environments ===
Shallow marine environments (SME) are characterized by various types of sedimentary structures, including:

- Graded bedding: characterized by a vertical gradation in grain size, with the smallest grains at the top
- Ripples: the smallest bedform type
- Dunes: larger and similar in shape to ripples

=== Carbonaceous rocks in SMEs ===
Carbonaceous sedimentary rock in shallow marine environments contains significant amounts of non-skeletal matter along with siliciclastic or chemical constituents and can exhibit a range of sedimentary structures, including:

- Cross stratification: a layering structure found in gravel, sand, and coarse silt-sized sediment, characterized by distinct layers that are steeply inclined to the underlying surface.
- Desiccation cracks: cracks formed by the drying of newly deposited mud in sub-aerial climates.
- Flame structures: mud shaped like flames that intrude into the overlying layer of rock.
- Convolute folds: sediment folded into irregular anticlines and/or synclines.
- Flutes: outstretched ridges that are rounded at one end and flared at the other.
- Groove casts: outstretched, almost straight grooves in sediment caused by the dragging of an object.
- Chevron structures: a V-shaped type of groove cast, resulting from stress applied in two or more directions, found on the bottoms of beds deposited in shallow water environments.
- Syneresis cracks: cracks formed by means other than sub-aerial climate exposure, including contraction by clay clumping, contraction from settling during faulting, smectitic clay compaction from dewatering due to a salinity change in surrounding water, compaction dewatering under sediment causing injection from below or collapsing from above, and tensional opening due to down-sloping of a surface mud layer.
- Fenestrae: open or partially filled spaces occupied by different sediment or cement

== Water composition ==
=== Characteristics ===
Shallow marine environments are typically characterized by clear and shallow water. The distributional patterns of marine organisms in these environments can be used to define different types of shallow marine environments based on temperature, which can also provide insights into past patterns in paleolithic zones.

The boundaries between different shallow marine environment types in terms of climatic zones are not always agreed upon. However, three major criteria are used to define SME types: faunal provinces, faunal elements, and latitude.

==== Carbonate factory zones ====
Carbon dioxide is removed from the Earth atmosphere when it dissolves in seawater and forms carbonic acid. It then weathers rocks, producing bicarbonate and other ions. Calcium carbonate precipitates from calcium and the bicarbonate ions. Its long accumulation in thick geological layers gives rise to limestone formations. Many shallow marine environments are associated with carbonate factory zones, where processes that remove CO_{2} from the water transform bicarbonate ions into carbonate ions, supporting lime precipitation. These processes include increasing temperature, intense evaporation, and mixing water that is high in CO^{2−}_{3} and low in calcium cations with seawater.

==== Changes in limestone composition over geologic time ====
Over geologic time, the composition of limestone has changed from the unstable and more soluble aragonite-rich to the more stable calcite-rich. This change is influenced by the presence of magnesium ions, the second most abundant cations in seawater, which can inhibit calcite precipitation. Aragonite and calcite have the same chemical formula but a different crystalline structure. Aragonite is less prone to magnesium inhibition. Changes in the Mg/Ca ratio over geologic time, influenced by seafloor spreading and tectonic plate movement, have also contributed to controlling aragonite abundance and distribution.

== Organisms ==
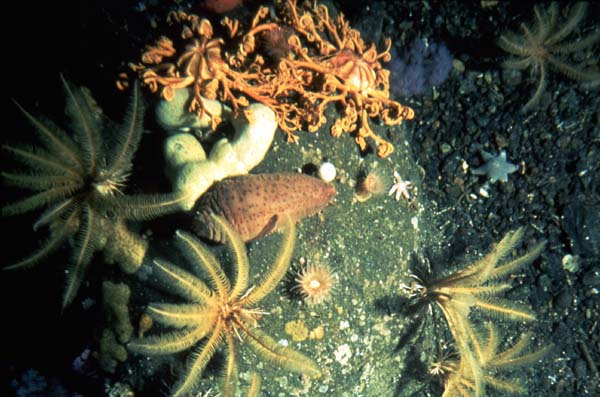
Echinoderms

Shallow marine environments, particularly the intertidal zone, are home to a diverse range of organisms, including starfish, sea anemones, sponges, marine worms, clams, mussels, predatory crustaceans, barnacles and small fish.

=== Hydrozoa and microinvertebrates ===
Hydrozoa, also known as hydroids, inhabit shallow marine environments and feed on surrounding algae and zooplankton. Species of isopods and amphipods are found in intertidal zones, creating complex burrows and surface tracks in the sediment. Brittle stars may bury themselves in sediment with their arms exposed.

=== Carbonate reefs ===
Shallow marine environments are characterized by carbonate reefs, which support many species. Estimates suggest that coral reefs alone may host between 1–9 million species. The three main types of reef formations are:

- Fringing Reefs: attached to the shore
- Barrier Reefs: separated from the mainland by a lagoon
- Atoll Reefs: ring-shaped reefs surrounding a lagoon

=== Reef organisms ===
Organisms that inhabit these reefs include red algae, green algae, bivalves and echinoderms. Many of these organisms contribute to reef formation. Furthermore, unicellular dinoflagellates live in coral tissues, engaging in a mutualistic relationship where they provide corals with essential organic molecules.

== Fossils ==
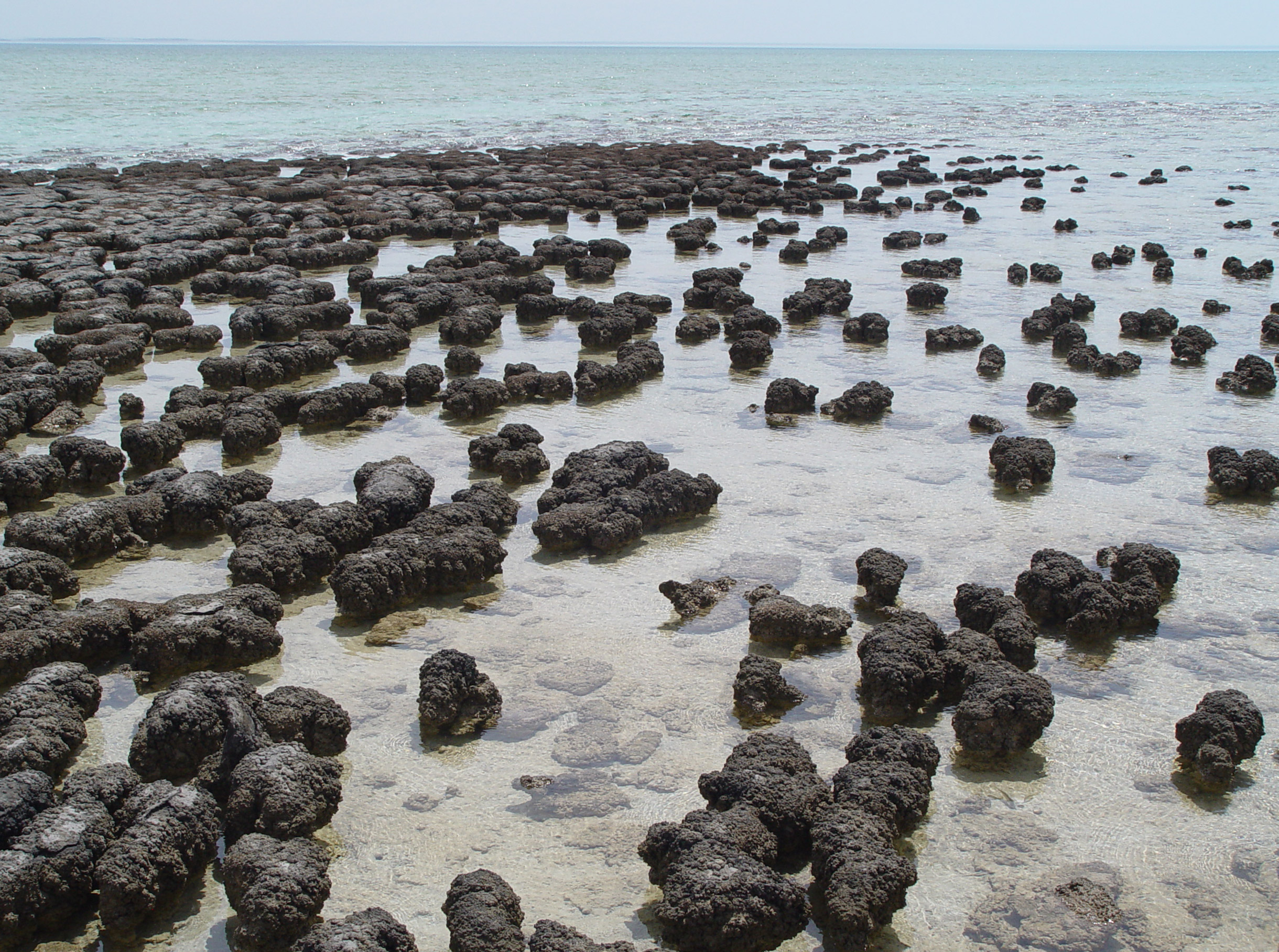
Stromatolites in Sharkbay (Western Australia)

The majority of the fossil record has been discovered in lithified SMEs, which were once home to diverse organisms. Many of these fossils date to periods when much of the Earth was covered in shallow seas.

Several types of fossils can be found in these environments, including:

- Skolithos ichnofacies: vertical, cylindrical, or U-shaped burrows created by organisms for protection. These are classified as trace fossils.
- Glossifungites ichnofacies: vertical, cylindrical, U-shaped, or tear-shaped borings or burrows created by organisms such as shrimp, crabs, worms, and bivalves. These are also classified as trace fossils.
- Stromatolites: laminated sedimentary structures formed when cyanobacteria produce microbial mats, trapping clay, silt sediment, and organic materials. These mats eventually lithify, embedding fossils.

== See also ==
- Tides in marginal seas
