= Columnar jointing =

Polygonal stone columns

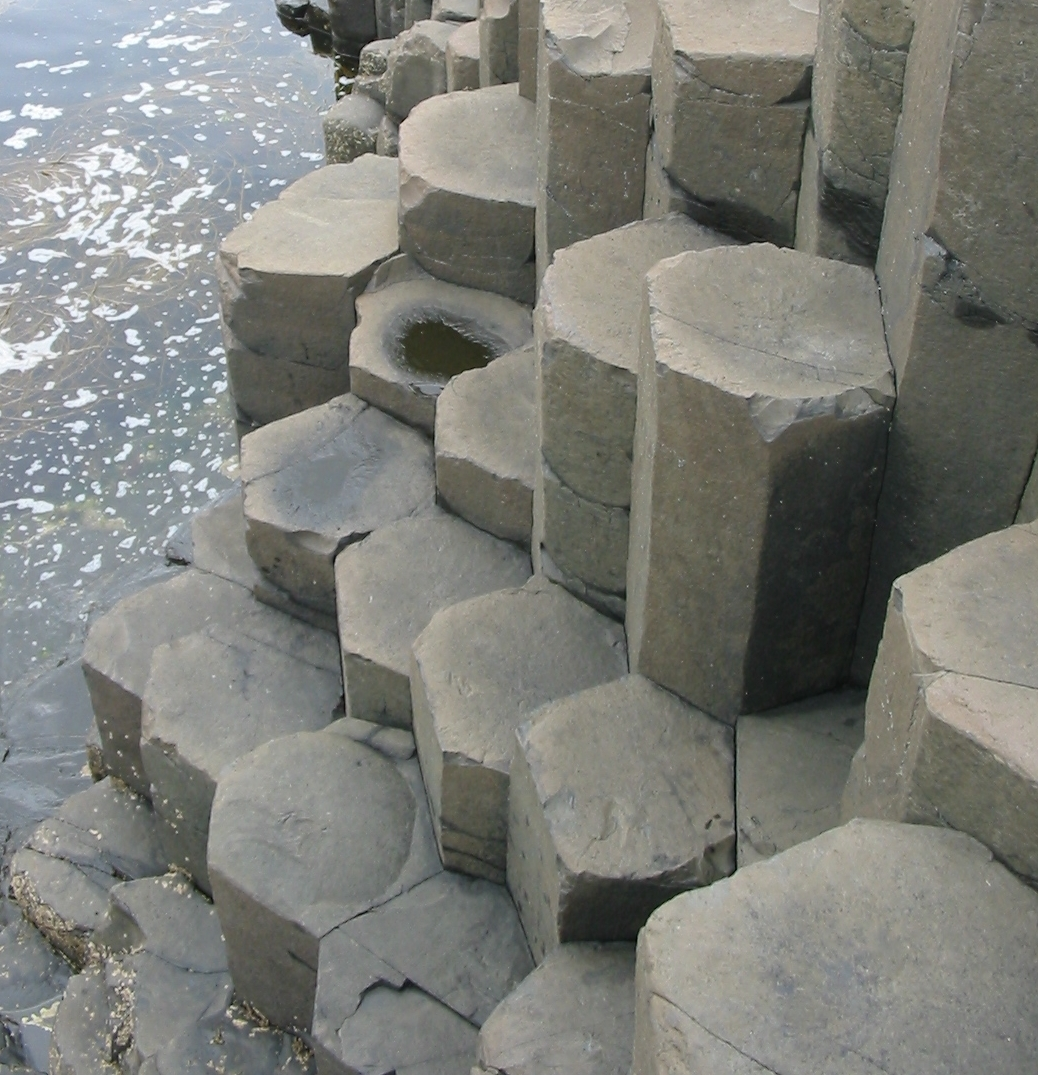
Columnar jointing in Giant's Causeway in Northern Ireland

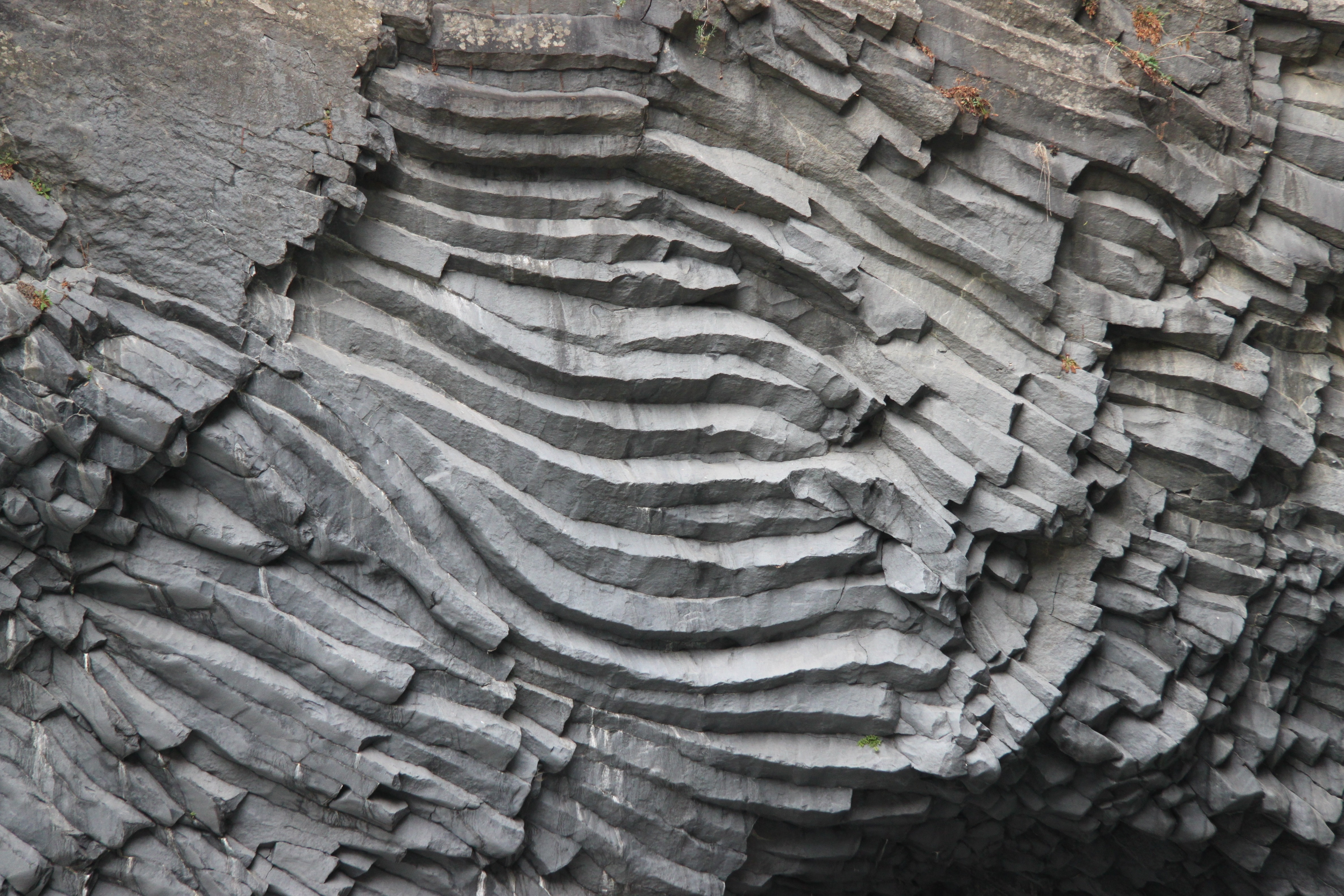
Columnar jointing in the Alcantara Gorge, Sicily

Columnar jointing is a geological structure where sets of intersecting closely spaced fractures, referred to as joints, result in the formation of a regular array of polygonal prisms, or columns. Columnar jointing occurs in many types of igneous rocks (e.g. basalt, andesite, rhyolite, tuff), and forms as the rock cools and contracts. Columnar jointing can occur in cooling lava flows and ashflow tuffs (ignimbrites), as well as in some shallow intrusions. Columnar jointing also occurs rarely in sedimentary rocks, due to a combination of dissolution and reprecipitation of interstitial minerals (often quartz or cryptocrystalline silica) by hot, hydrothermal fluids and the expansion and contraction of the rock unit, both resulting from the presence of a nearby magmatic intrusion.

The columns can vary from 3 meters to a few centimeters in diameter, and can be as much as 30 meters tall. They are typically parallel and straight, but can also be curved and vary in diameter. An array of regular, straight, and larger-diameter columns is called a colonnade; an irregular, less-straight, and smaller-diameter array is termed an entablature. The number of sides of the individual columns can vary from 3 to 8, with 6 sides being the most common.

== Physics ==
When magma or lava cools into solid igneous rock, for example basalt, much heat still remains. As it cools down further, the basalt contracts, and it forms cracks to release the tensile energy. It then is cooled down further by groundwater boiling and reflux.

When the cracks first form at the surface, the cracks are dominated by T-junctions, like mudcracks, because they were formed individually. One crack would form and move across the surface, until it hits upon a previous crack, forming a T-junction.

Then, these cracks extend downwards in a moving front that is roughly planar and parallel to the surface. As it moves, the crack pattern anneals to become lower in energy. The speed v at which the front moves is determined by the groundwater flow rate. After the front moves a few meters deep, it would evolve into a hexagonal grid with roughly equal width L. The width L is determined by the basalt's material properties, and the speed v at which the front moves.

=== Scaling ===
Define Péclet number $Pe = \frac{Lv}{D}$ where $D$ is the thermal diffusivity of the material. For all columnar jointing, the value of Pe is around 0.2, and thus the shape and speed of all columnar joints are similar after scaling. A scaled model can be made by drying cornstarch a centimeter thick, which creates columns about 1 mm wide.

For basalt, $Pe \approx 0.35$. For cornstarch, $Pe \approx 0.1$.

== Places ==
Some famous locations in the United States where columnar jointing can be found are Devils Tower in Wyoming, Devils Postpile in California and the Columbia River flood basalts in Oregon, Washington and Idaho. Other famous places include the Giant's Causeway in Northern Ireland, Fingal's Cave on the island of Staffa, Scotland and the Stuðlagil Canyon, Iceland.

=== Devils Tower ===
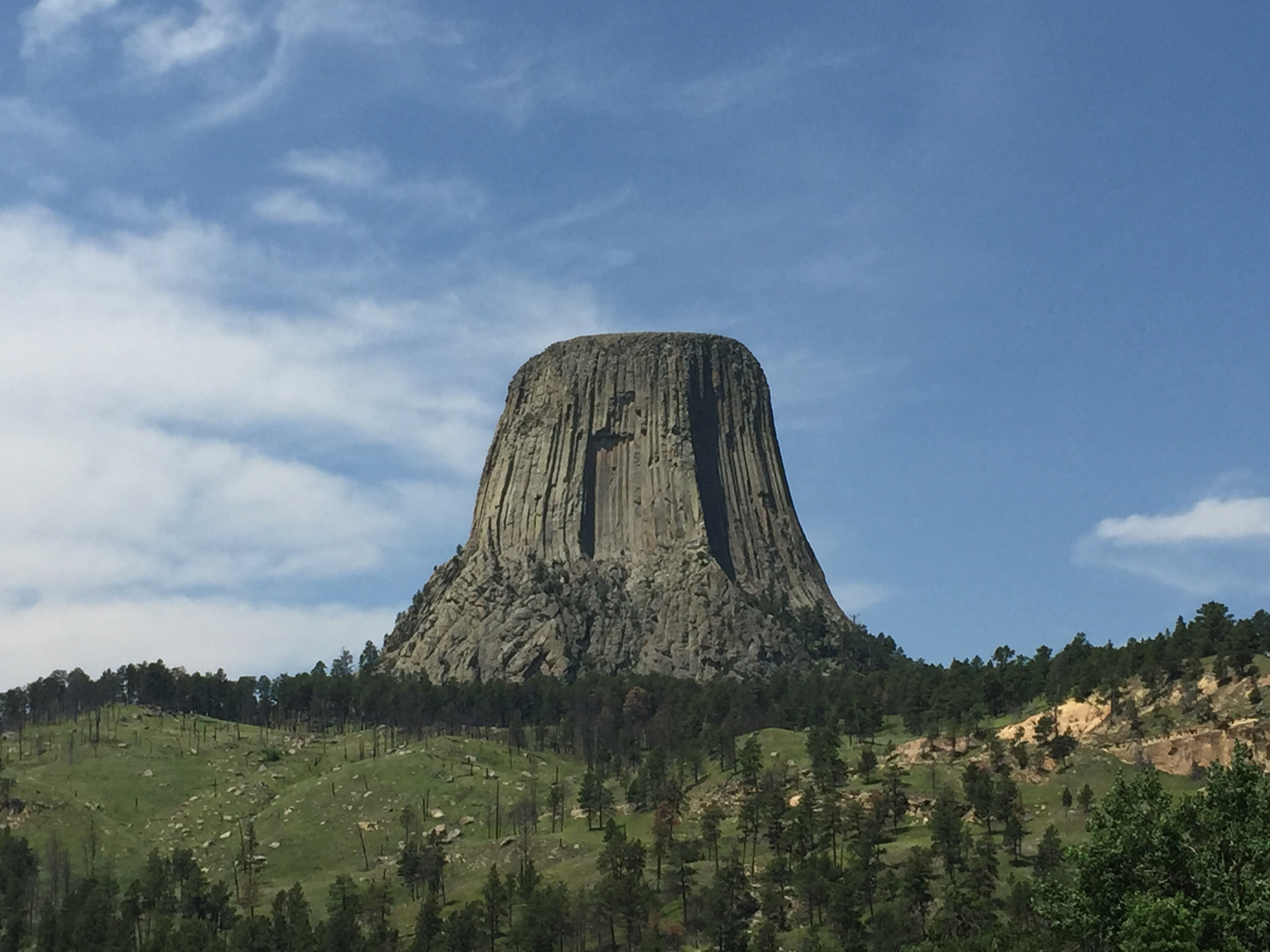
Devils Tower is an eroded laccolith in the Black Hills National Forest, Wyoming.

Devils Tower in Wyoming in the United States is about 40 million years old and 382 meters (1,253 feet) high. Geologists agree that the rock forming Devils Tower solidified from an intrusion, but it has not been established whether the magma from this intrusion ever reached the surface. Most columns are 6-sided, but 4, 5, and 7-sided ones can also be found.

=== Giant's Causeway ===
The Giant's Causeway (Irish: Clochán An Aifir) on the north Antrim coast of Northern Ireland was created by volcanic activity 60 million years ago, and consists of over 40,000 columns. According to a legend, the giant Finn McCool created the Giant's Causeway, as a causeway to Scotland.

=== Sōunkyō Gorge ===
Sōunkyō Gorge, a part of the town of Kamikawa, Hokkaido, Japan, features a 24-kilometre (15 mi) stretch of columnar jointing, which is the result of an eruption of the Daisetsuzan Volcanic Group 30,000 years ago.

=== Deccan Traps ===
The late Cretaceous Deccan Traps of India constitute one of the largest volcanic provinces of Earth, and examples of columnar jointing can be found in St. Mary's Island in the state of Karnataka.

=== High Island Reservoir ===
Formed in Cretaceous, the columnar rocks are found around the reservoir and the islands nearby in Sai Kung, Hong Kong. It is special that the rocks are not mafic, but felsic tuff instead.

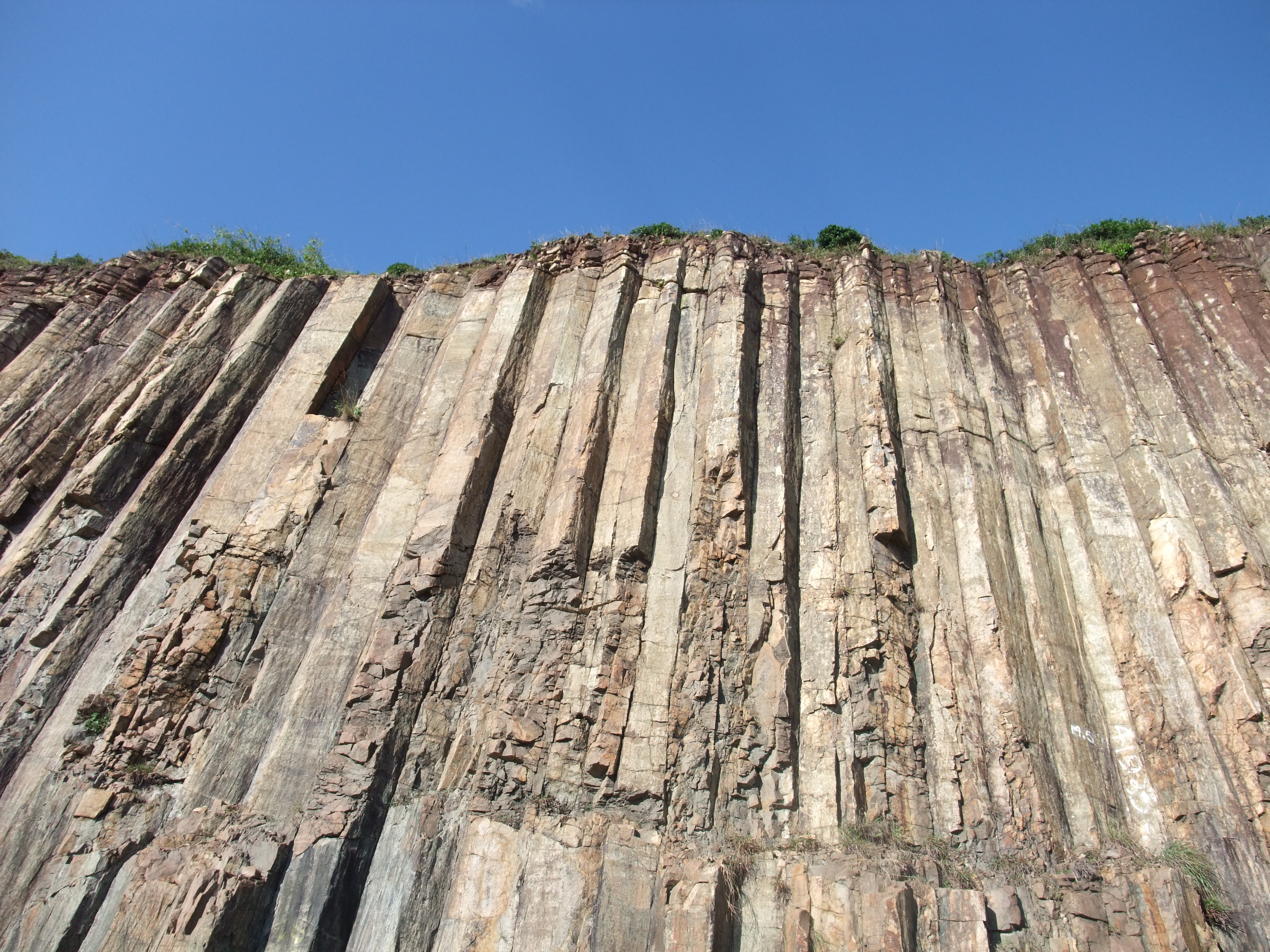
Hexagonal volcanic tuffs at East Dam of High Island Reservoir

=== Makhtesh Ramon ===
The columnar jointed sandstone of the HaMinsara (Carpentry Shop) in the makhtesh (erosion cirque) of Makhtesh Ramon, Negev desert, Israel.

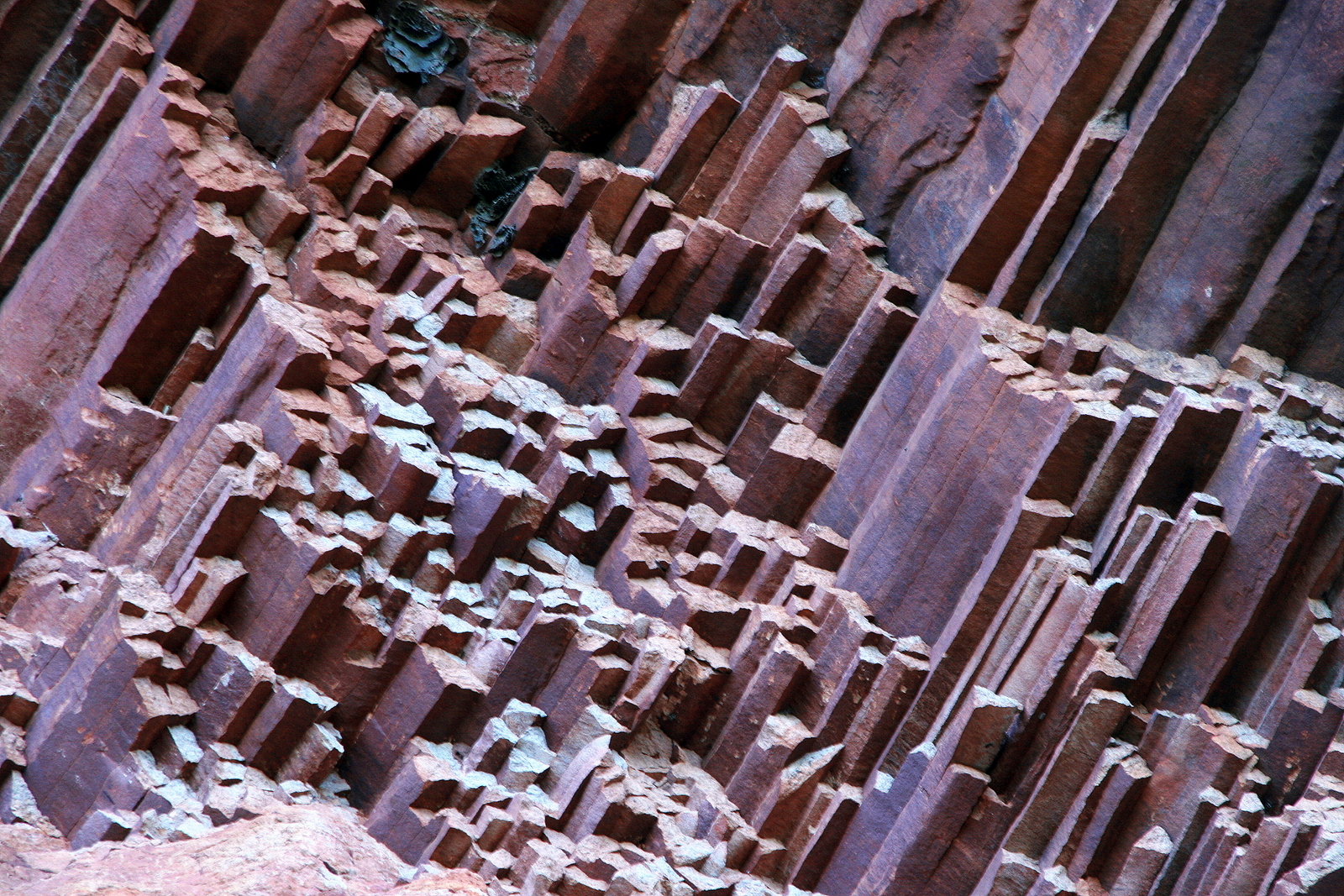
Columnar jointing in sandstone, Cerro Koi, Paraguay

=== Cerro Kõi ===
There are several examples of columnar jointed sandstones in the greater Asunción region of Paraguay. The best known is Cerro Kõi in Areguá, but there are also several quarries in Luque.

=== Mars ===
Several exposures of columnar jointing have been discovered on the planet Mars by the High Resolution Imaging Science Experiment (HiRISE) camera, which is carried by the Mars Reconnaissance Orbiter (MRO).

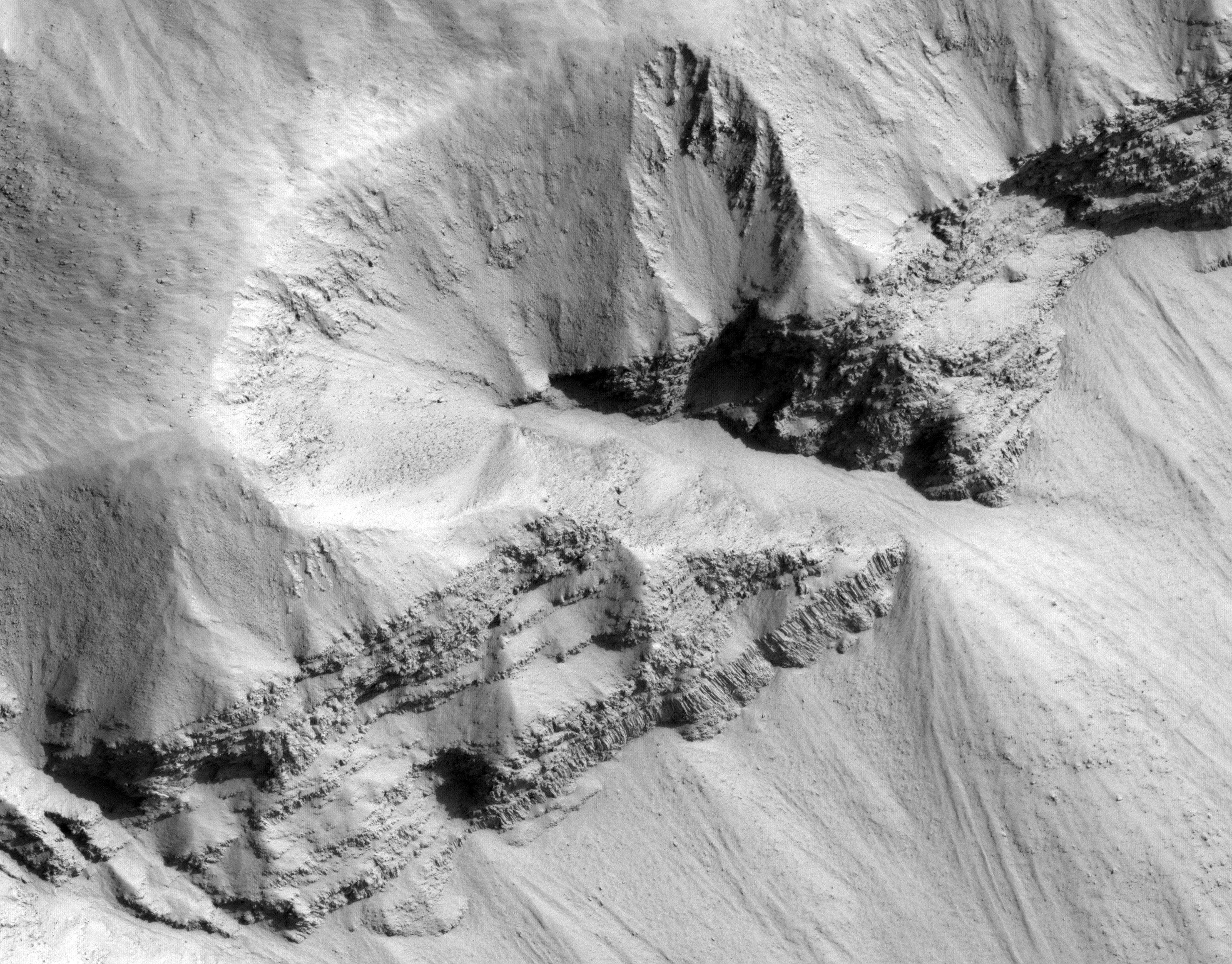
Columnar jointed rocks in unnamed crater wall, Marte Vallis region, Mars. Image courtesy of the High Resolution Imaging Science Experiment, University of Arizona.

=== Sawn Rocks ===
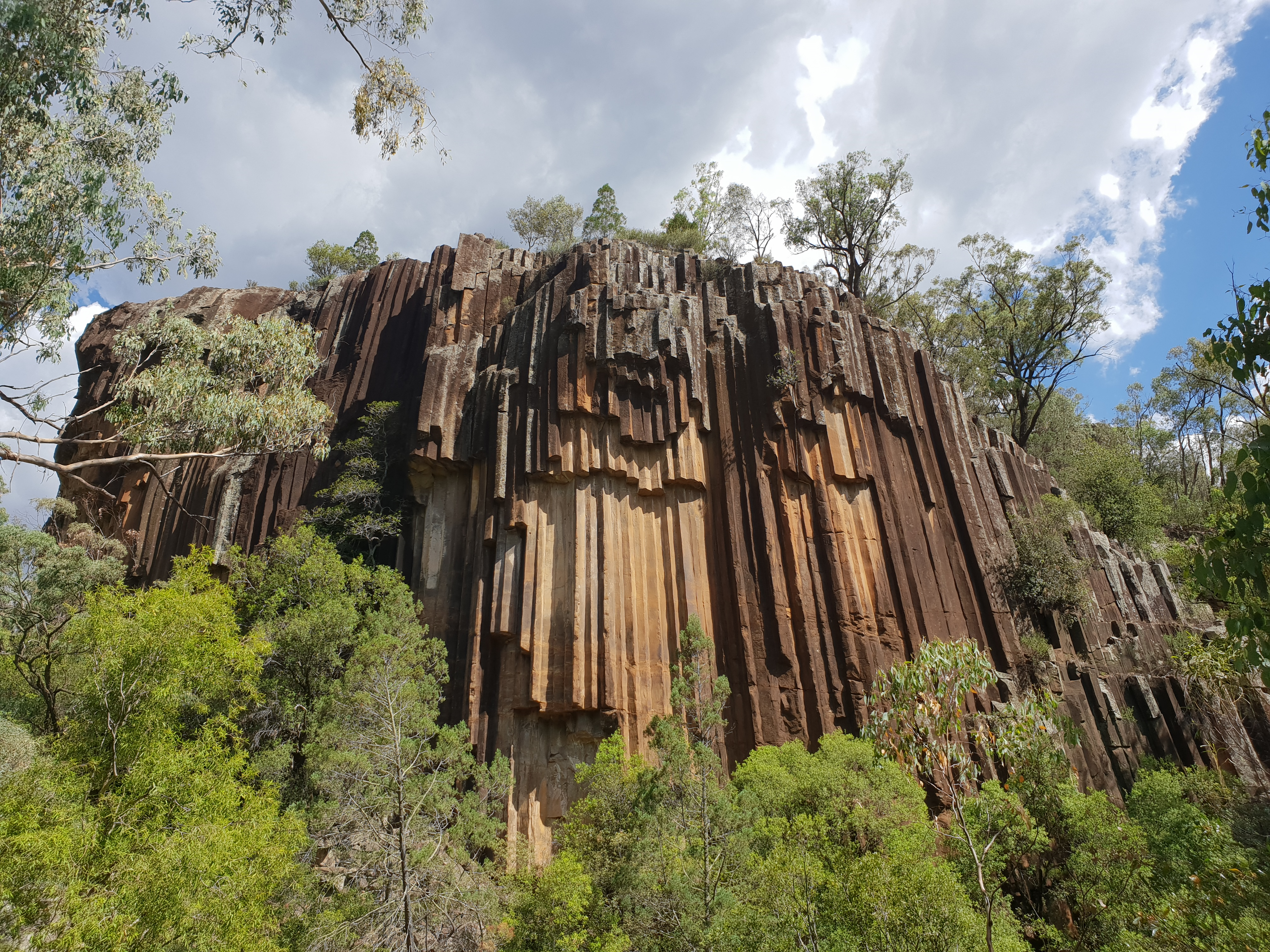
Columnar jointing at Sawn Rocks

Sawn Rocks, in Mount Kaputar National Park close to Narrabri, New South Wales, Australia, features 40 meters of columnar jointing above the creek and 30 meters below the surface.

=== Basaltic Prisms of Santa María Regla ===
Alexander von Humboldt documented the prisms located in Huasca de Ocampo, in the Mexican state of Hidalgo.

=== Columnar basalt of Tawau (Batu Bersusun) ===
At Kampung Balung Cocos, Tawau, Malaysia, the river flows through the area of columnar basalt. One section is seen vertically high on river bank. The rest lies on river bank. The water flows from the lowest area forming waterfall.

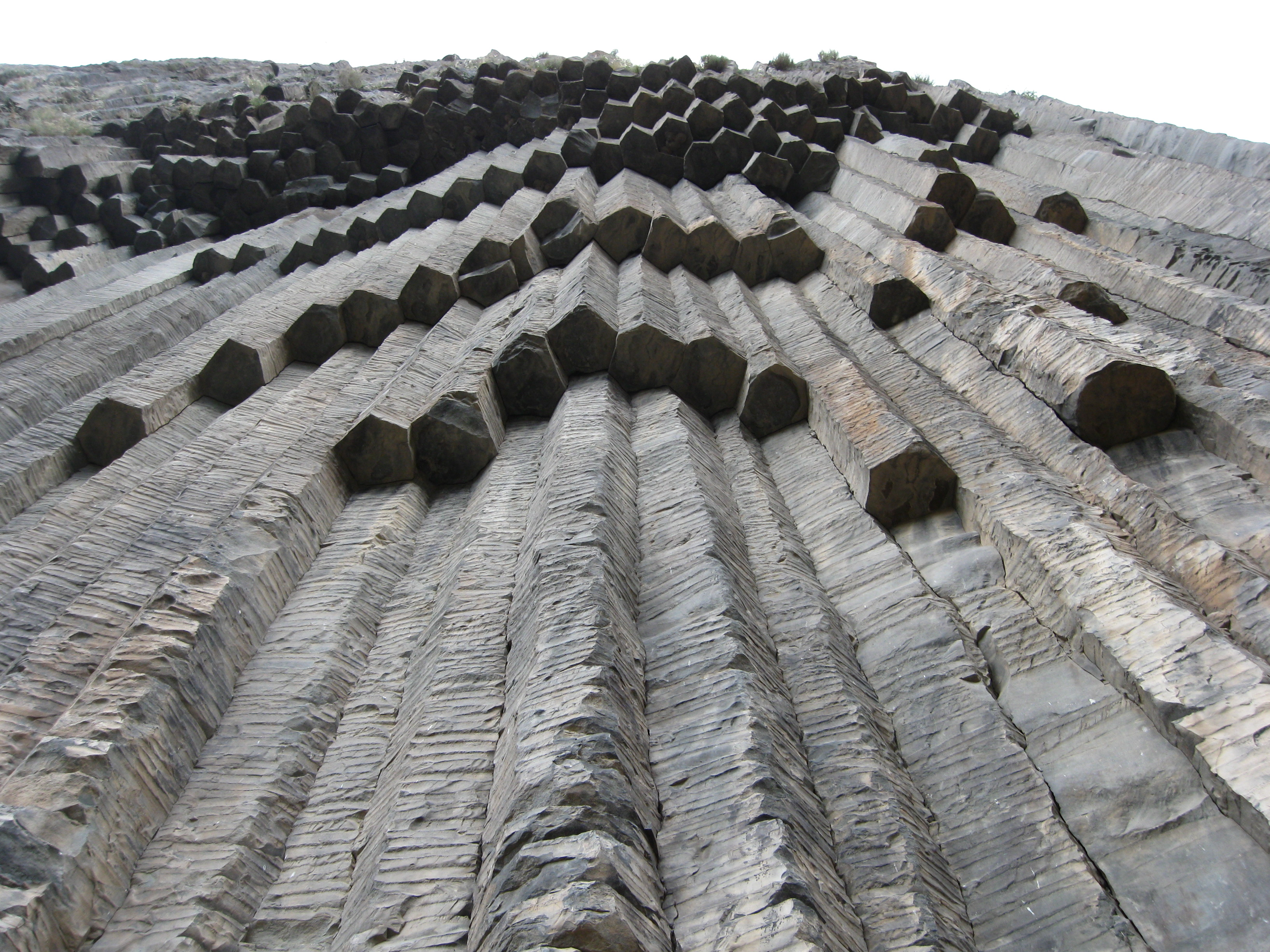
Garni gorge

=== Gorge of Garni, Armenia ===
The Garni Gorge is situated 23 km east of Yerevan, Armenia, just below the village of the same name. This portion of the Garni Gorge is typically referred to as the "Symphony of the Stones." On a promontory above the gorge the first-century AD Temple of Garni may be seen.

=== Stuðlagil Canyon, Iceland ===
The Stuðlagil Canyon, situated 45 miles west of Egilsstaðir, showing a view of columnar joint basalts rock formations and the blue-green water that runs through it.

=== Black Point, Australia ===
Black Point, situated in the D'Entrecasteaux National Park, in Western Australia is an example of black columnar basalt.

=== Jusangjeolli, South Korea ===
The columnar jointing (Jusangjeolli in Korean) on the southern coast near Seogwipo on the island of Jeju is a popular tourist destination.

== See also ==
- Basalt fan structure
- Honeycomb conjecture
- Mudcrack
- Prism (geology)
- Syneresis crack
