= Stuðlagil =

Basalt column canyon in East Iceland

Stuðlagil Canyon

Geology
- Type: Basalt columnar jointing

Geography
- Location: Jökuldalur, East Iceland
- Coordinates: 65.144°N 15.307°W
- Rivers: Jökulsá á Dal
- Interactive map of Stuðlagil Canyon

Stuðlagil Canyon (Icelandic pronunciation: [ˈstʏðlaˌcɪːl̥]; also transliterated as Studlagil) is a basalt column canyon located in the Jökuldalur valley in East Iceland. Known for its towering hexagonal basalt formations and vivid turquoise river, the canyon gained international attention after the flow of the Jökulsá á Dal (Jökla) River was reduced due to the Kárahnjúkar Hydropower Plant project. Though the canyon was physically revealed between 2006 and 2009, it remained largely unknown until its popularization by Icelandic photographer and travel writer in 2016.

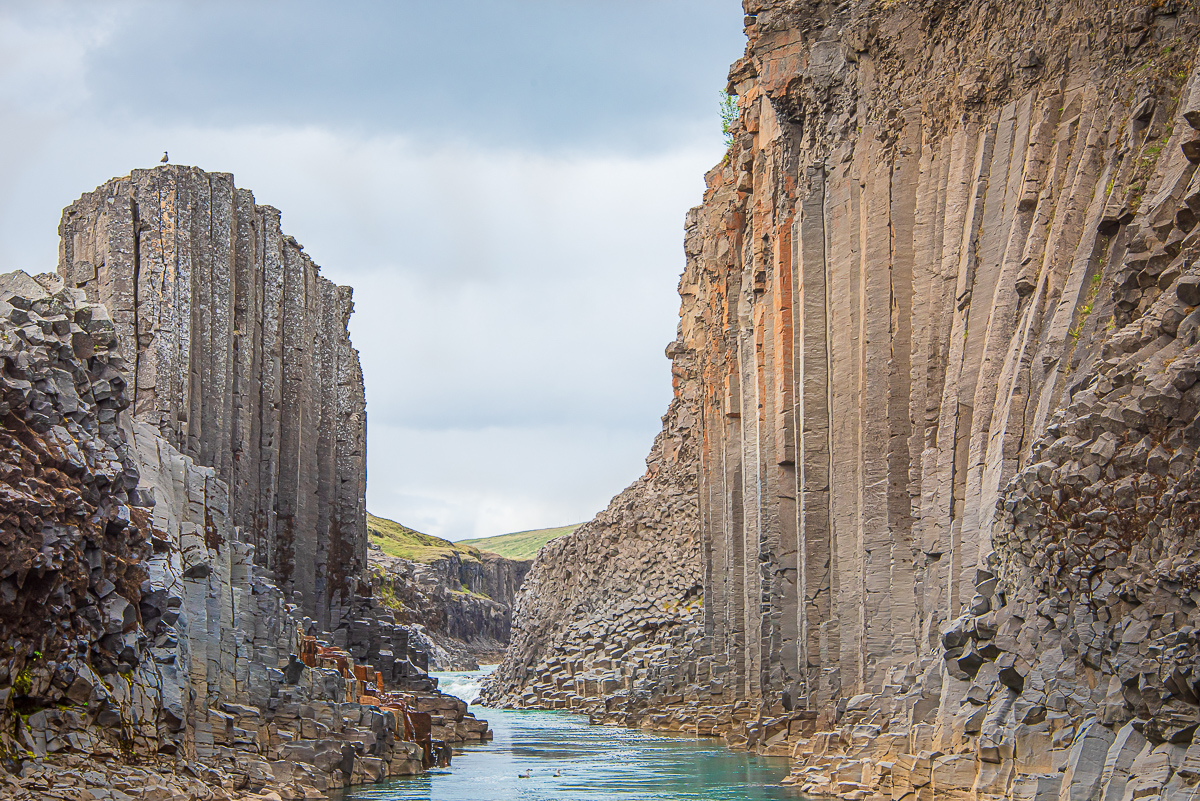
Stuðlagil Canyon

== Geological features ==
Stuðlagil Canyon is composed of hexagonal basalt columns formed by the slow cooling and contraction of thick lava flows during volcanic activity. This geological structure, known as basalt columns or sometimes columnar jointing, is found in several places in Iceland, but Stuðlagil is notable for the height, number, and alignment of its columns. The canyon's formations rise vertically from the riverbed, with some reaching several meters in height.

The vivid turquoise color of the river flowing through the canyon is due to fine glacial silt suspended in the water. This coloration is most prominent in summer, when the river is fed by clearer water from reservoirs upstream.

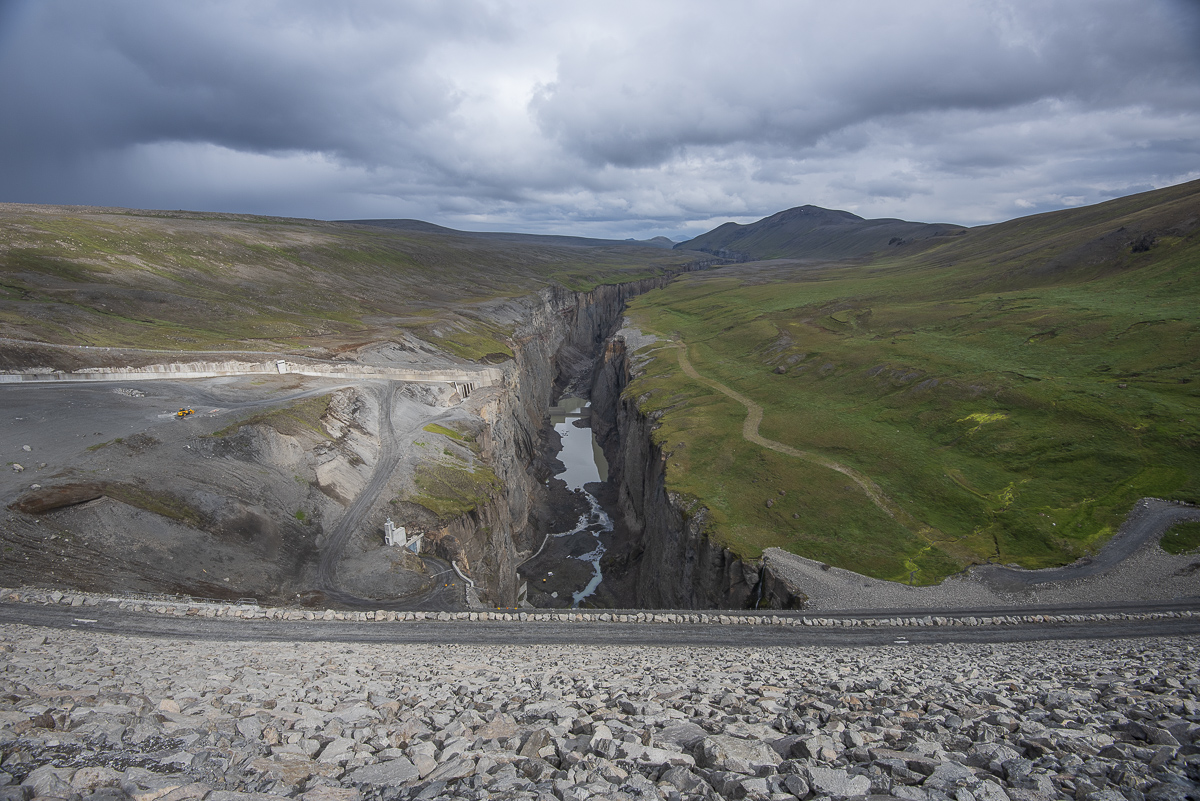
Hafrahvammagljúfur canyon an Kárahnjúkar

== Hydrological transformation ==
Before the hydropower project, the Jökulsá á Dal was Iceland’s longest and one of its most sediment-heavy glacial rivers. With the construction of the Kárahnjúkar Dam (completed in 2009), water from the river was diverted to power an aluminum smelter, reducing flow in the canyon from approximately 205 m³/s to around 95 m³/s. As a result, large portions of Stuðlagil previously submerged were revealed, and the river changed from a muddy brown to a clearer turquoise hue.

== Popularization ==
Though visible as early as 2006–2007, Stuðlagil remained unknown to the general public until 2016, when an Icelandic photographer and travel writer Einar Páll Svavarsson visited the site, photographed it, and wrote the first comprehensive article. He named the site "Stuðlagil" (from stuðlar, meaning basalt columns), mapped it on Google Maps, and secured permission from local landowners before publishing. His article and photos gained widespread attention, especially after being featured in WOW air's in-flight magazine.

In 2018, Svavarsson’s role in revealing and naming the canyon was formally recognized by Iceland’s Minister of Tourism. A 2019 report by the University of Iceland and the Icelandic Tourism Research Centre further validated his discovery and documentation.

== Tourism and accessibility ==
Stuðlagil lies near Route 1 and is accessed via Road 923. Visitors can view the canyon from either the west bank—where a viewing platform is installed—or the east bank, which requires a 5 km hike for a closer experience. Due to its sudden popularity, infrastructure has improved significantly since 2019, including the development of footpaths, parking areas, and future footbridge plans.

Safety remains a concern, especially in winter when roads and paths may be icy. Seasonal river color changes and trail accessibility also influence the best time to visit, typically between June and October.

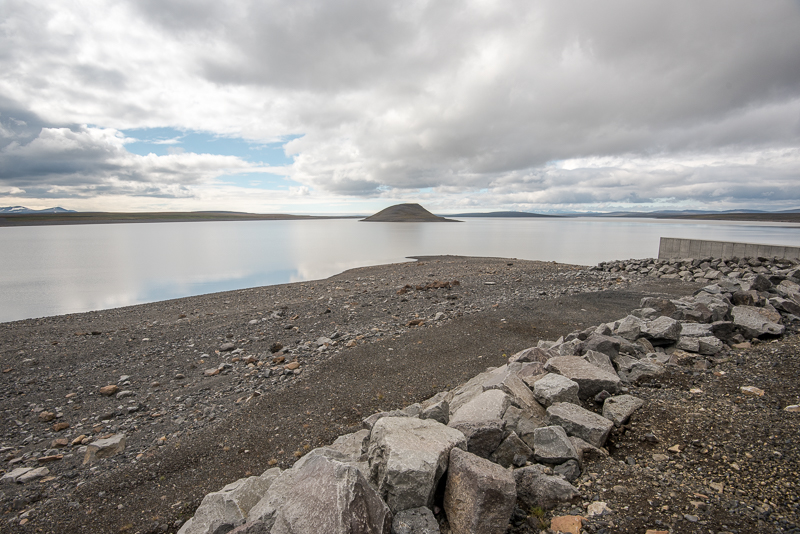
Halsalon reservoir

As of 2026, two tourists have died after falling into the canyon.

== Environmental and socio-economic impacts ==
The Kárahnjúkar project remains controversial due to the flooding of highland wilderness and waterfalls like Töfrafoss. However, the unintended revelation of Stuðlagil has brought economic revitalization to the remote Jökuldalur region, creating tourism-related jobs and services. Local farmers participate in site maintenance and visitor services.

The canyon is now considered a case of "accidental conservation"—a natural attraction created through human alteration of the landscape. It highlights the complex relationship between environmental change, discovery, and tourism in the Anthropocene era.

== See also ==
- Columnar basalt
- Geology of Iceland
