= Prism (geology) =

In sedimentology, a prism is a long, narrow, wedge-shaped sedimentary body. These types of sediments are typically formed during orogenic deformation; for example, the arkose detrital sedimentary rock found in fault troughs.

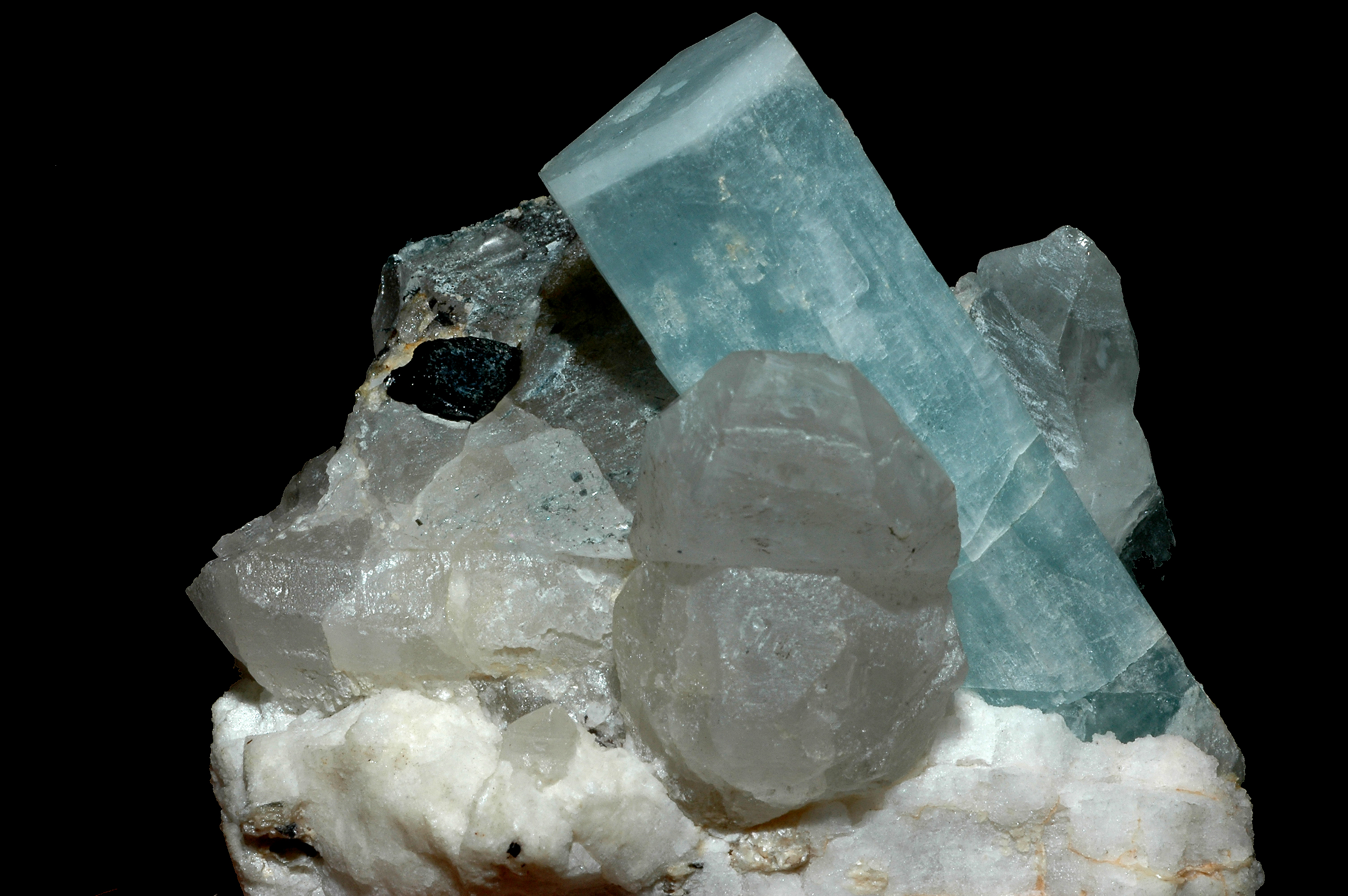
Hexagonal aquamarine prism with stubby quartz prisms

In mineralogy, prismatic is also type of mineral habit (appearance of a crystal). Prismatic minerals have crystals that show a uniform cross-section. Prismatic crystals typically have 3, 4, 6, 8 or 12 faces which are parallel to a crystallographic axis. The apatite group of minerals commonly exhibit elongated hexagonal prisms.

== Accretionary prism ==
An accretionary prism or accretionary wedge is formed from sediments that are accreted onto the non-subducting tectonic plate at a convergent plate boundary. Most of the material in the accretionary wedge consists of marine sediments scraped off from the downgoing slab of oceanic crust but in some cases includes the erosional products of volcanic island arcs formed on the overriding plate.

== Crystal habit ==
Crystal habit is an overall description of the visible external shape of a mineral. This description can apply to an individual crystal or an assembly of crystals or aggregates. Predominant crystal faces (prism - prismatic, pyramid - pyramidal and pinacoid - platy). Crystal forms (cubic, octahedral, dodecahedral). Aggregation of crystals or aggregates (fibrous, botryoidal, radiating, massive). Crystal appearance (foliated/lamellar (layered), dendritic, bladed, acicular, lenticular, tabular (tablet shaped)).

== See also ==
- Thrust tectonics
- Extensional tectonics
- Columnar jointing
