= Hálslón Reservoir =

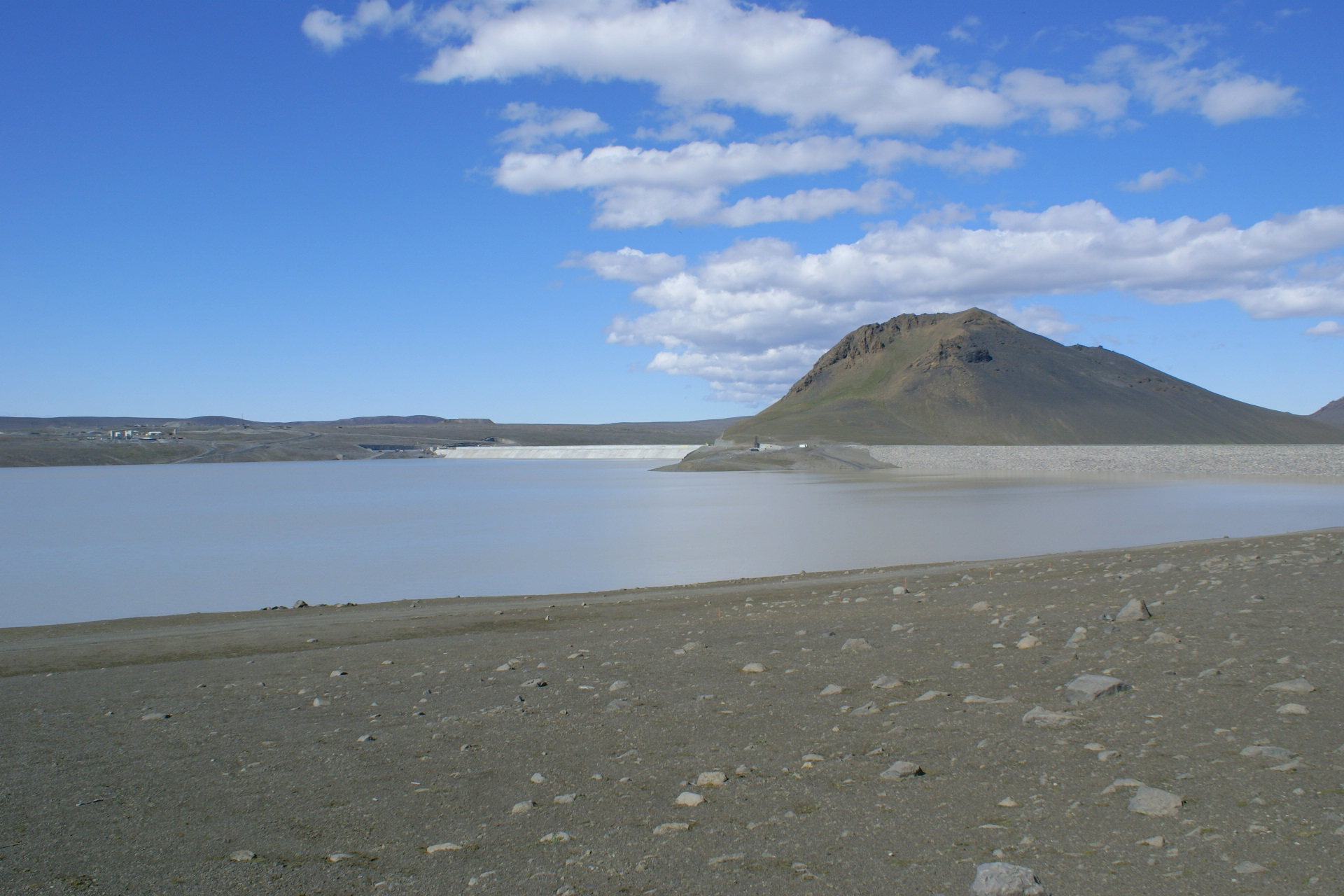
- Hálslón Reservoir and the Kárahnjúkastífla Dam

- Location within Iceland
- Location: Iceland
- Coordinates: 64°55′36″N 15°49′20″W
- Lake type: Reservoir
- Primary inflows: Jökulsá á Dal River - 107 m^{3}/s (3,800 cu ft/s)
- Primary outflows: Jökulsá á Dal River & Jökulsá í Fljótsdal River
- Catchment area: 1,806 square kilometres (446,000 acres)
- Basin countries: Iceland
- Max. length: 25 km (16 mi)
- Water volume: 2,100×10^{6} m^{3} (74×10^{9} cu ft) (live)
- Surface elevation: 575–625 m (1,886–2,051 ft)

The Hálslón Reservoir (Icelandic pronunciation: [ˈhaulsˌlouːn]) is a storage reservoir in Eastern Iceland on the Jökulsá á Dal River. The reservoir stores water for use in hydroelectricity production with the Kárahnjúkar Hydropower Plant. The reservoir was formed by three different concrete-faced, rock-filled embankment dams: the Kárahnjúkastífla Dam, the Desjarárstífla Dam [ˈtɛːsjarˌaurˌstipla] and the Sauðárdalsstífla Dam [ˈsœyːðˌaurˌtalsˌstipla].

== Dams ==
The Kárahnjúkastífla Dam is 193m tall, 730m long and straddles the river. It is made of 8.5 million cubic meters of material, making it the largest dam of its type in Europe. Construction on the dam began in April 2003 and was completed in November 2006. The Kárahnjúkastífla Dam does not create the reservoir alone, as the dam is higher in elevation than the two valleys that flank the river valley. To create the desired level, auxiliary or saddle dams were built. The 60m tall and 1,000m long Desjarárstífla Dam is adjacent and to the east of the Kárahnjúkastífla Dam. The Sauðárdalsstífla Dam is 4 km to the southwest, 25m tall and 1,100m long. Both auxiliary dams were built between April 2004 and October 2006. The reservoir began to fill in September 2006.

Water used for hydroelectricity production in the reservoir is discharged in the Jökulsá í Fljótsdal [ˈjœːkʏlsˌauː i ˈfljoutsˌtaːl̥] river to the northeast.

== Conservation ==
In January 2005, the Icelandic parliament voted to give a large area around the dam park status, thereby protecting it. The area covers one-tenth of Iceland's surface area.
