= Jökulsá á Dal =

River in Iceland

Coordinates: 65°39′16″N 14°18′44″W

Jökulsá á Dal Jökulsá á Brú, Jökla
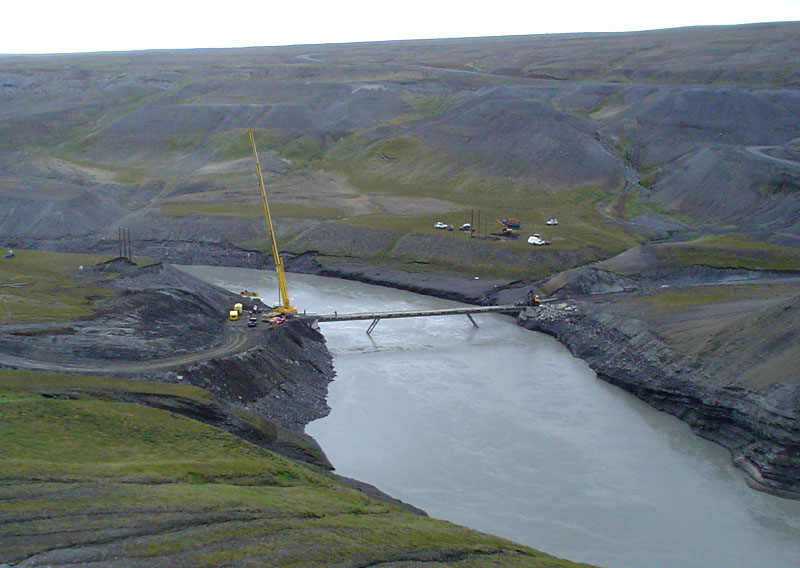
- Building of a bridge over the Jökulsá á Dal at Kárahnjúkar, 2004

Location
- Country: Iceland
- Region: Eastern Region

Physical characteristics
- Source: Vatnajökull (Brúarjökull outlet glacier)
- Length: 150 km (93 mi)
- Basin size: 3,700 km^{2} (1,400 sq mi)

Jökulsá á Dal, (pronounced [ˈjœːkʏlsˌauː auː ˈtaːl̥], lit. 'glacial river in valley') also called Jökulsá á Brú [ˈpruː] or Jökla, [ˈjœhkla] is a river in the northeast of Iceland.

Of its original length of 150 km (making it the longest river in Iceland's Eastern Region), 25 km are now part of the artificial lake Hálslón created for the Kárahnjúkar Hydropower Plant. This reduced the river's discharge from 205 m³/s to 95 m³/s, consisting of water from tributaries below the dam. Before construction of the dam, the river used to transport approximately 120 t of sediment per hour into the North Atlantic. The water from the reservoir is now redirected into Lagarfljót.

Due to the strong current, fording of the Jökulsá á Dal isn't possible. The first bridge across it was built in 1625. The bridge on Iceland's Route 1 (Hringvegur) was built in 1994, when the road to Egilsstaðir was upgraded. The previous bridge still stands, some distance downstream.

In the novel Independent People by Icelandic author Halldór Laxness, the protagonist Bjartur rides through the river on a reindeer.

== See also ==
- List of rivers of Iceland
- Stuðlagil, which Jökulsá runs through
