= Kárahnjúkar Hydropower Plant =

Dam in Iceland

Fljótsdalur Power Station Kárahnjúkar Dam
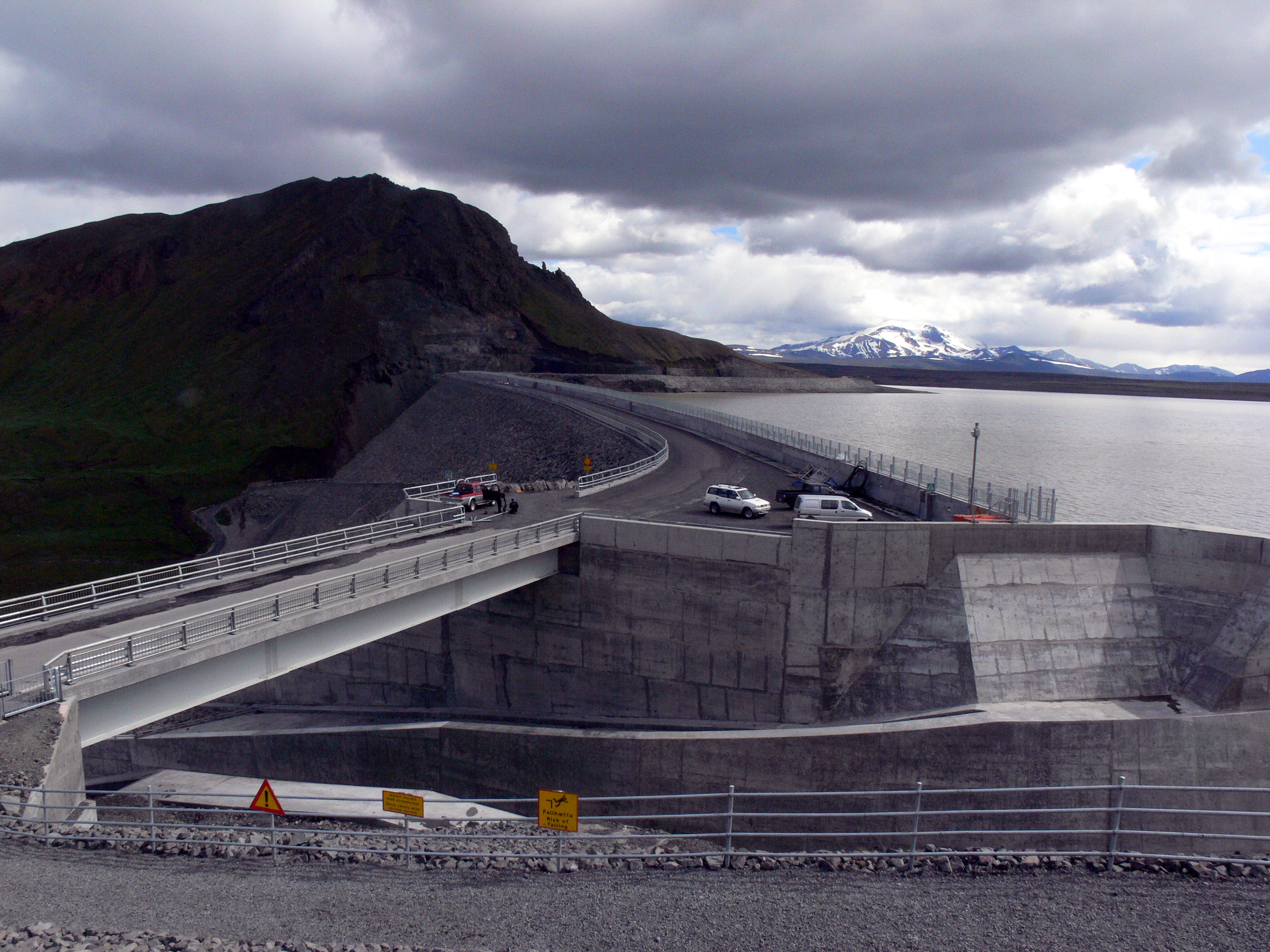
- Main Kárahnjúkar Dam

- Location within Iceland
- Country: Iceland
- Coordinates: 64°56′N 15°48′W
- Status: Operational
- Opening date: 2009

Dam and spillways
- Type of dam: Embankment, concrete-face rock-fill dams
- Impounds: Jökulsá á Dal; Jökulsá í Fljótsdal
- Height: 193 m (633 ft)
- Length: 730 m (2,400 ft)
- Dam volume: 8.5×10^{6} m^{3} (300×10^{6} cu ft)
- Spillways: 1
- Spillway type: Tunnel

Reservoir
- Creates: Hálslón Reservoir
- Total capacity: 2.1 km^{3} (1,700,000 acre⋅ft)
- Maximum length: 25 km (16 mi)

Power Station
- Operator: Landsvirkjun
- Turbines: 6 x 115 MW Francis-type
- Installed capacity: 690 MW
- Annual generation: 4,600 GWh

Kárahnjúkar Hydropower Plant (Icelandic: Kárahnjúkavirkjun; [ˈkʰauːraˌn̥juːkaˌvɪr̥cʏn]), officially called Fljótsdalur Power Station (Icelandic: Fljótsdalsstöð [ˈfljoutsˌtalsˌstœːθ]) is a hydroelectric power plant in Fljótsdalshérað municipality in eastern Iceland, designed to produce 4,600 gigawatt-hours (17,000 TJ) annually for Alcoa's Fjarðaál aluminum smelter 75 kilometres (47 mi) to the east in Reyðarfjörður. With the installed capacity of 690 MW the plant is the largest power plant in Iceland. The project, named after the nearby Kárahnjúkar mountains, involves damming the rivers Jökulsá á Dal and Jökulsá í Fljótsdal with five dams, creating three reservoirs. Water from the reservoirs is diverted through 73 kilometres (45 mi) of underground water tunnels and down a 420-metre (1,380 ft) vertical penstock towards a single underground power station. The smelter became fully operational in 2008 and the hydropower project was completed in 2009.

The Kárahnjúkar Dam (Icelandic: Kárahnjúkastífla [ˈkʰauːraˌn̥juːkaˌstipla]) is the centrepiece of the five dams and the largest of its type in Europe, standing 193 metres (633 ft) tall with a length of 730 metres (2,400 ft) and comprising 8.5 million cubic metres (300×10^{6} cu ft) of material.

The project has been heavily criticised for its environmental impact and its use of foreign workers.

== Description ==
The hydroelectricity project harnesses the rivers Jökulsá á Dal and Jökulsá í Fljótsdal by creating three reservoirs with five concrete-face rock-filled embankment dams; three on the Jökulsá á Dal and two on the Jökulsá í Fljótsdal. After being used in the Fljótsdalur Power Station, all water used in electricity production is discharged into the river Jökulsá í Fljótsdal.

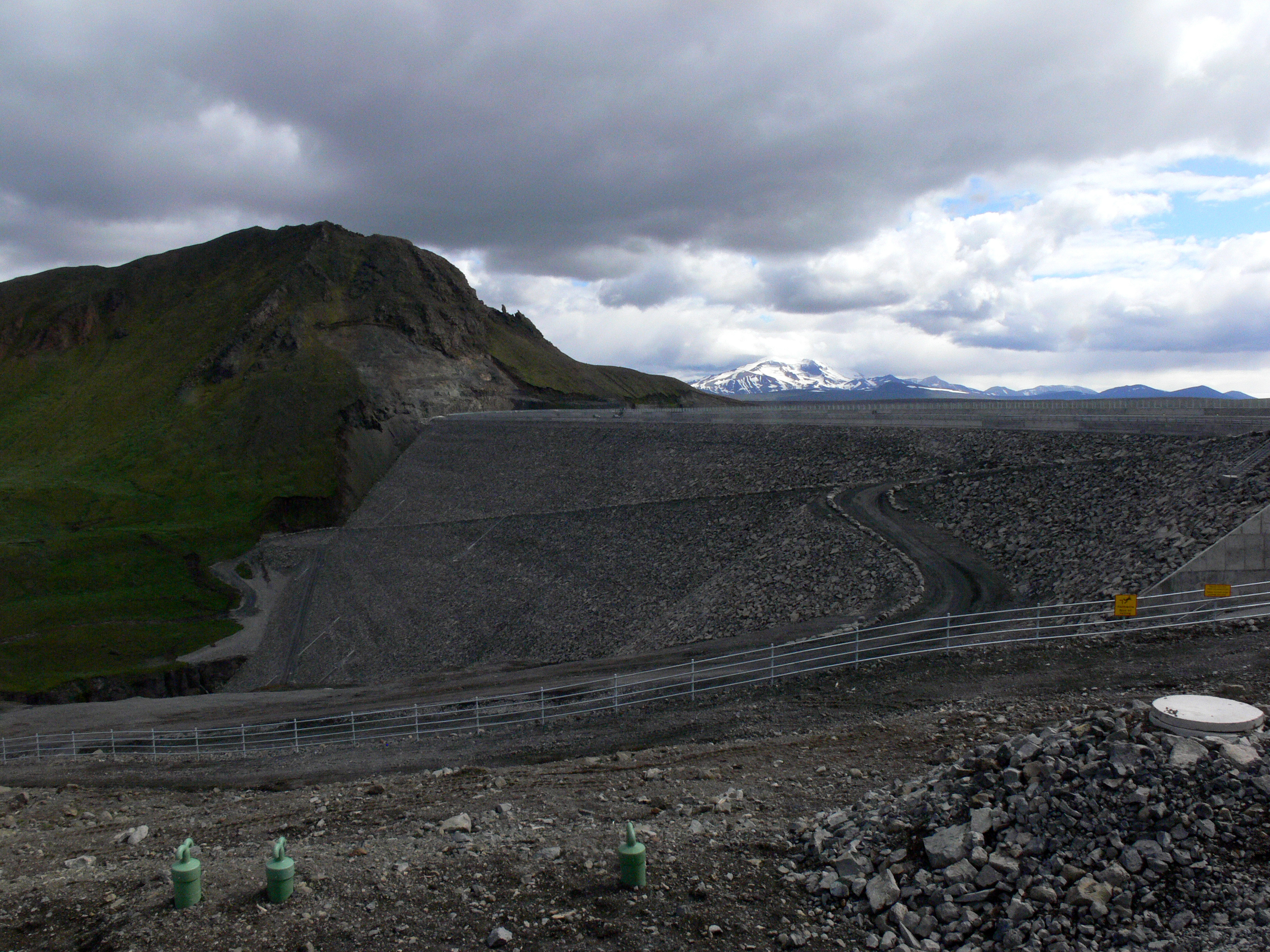
Kárahnjúkar Dam

Three dams on the Jökulsá á Dal—the Kárahnjúkar Dam (Icelandic: Kárahnjúkastífla), the Desjará Dam (Icelandic: Desjarárstífla), and the Sauðárdalur Dam (Icelandic: Sauðárdalsstífla)—create the Hálslón Reservoir. At 193 metres (633 ft) tall and 730 metres (2,400 ft) long, the Kárahnjúkar Dam is the largest dam in the project and the largest of its type in Europe. The 60-metre-tall (200 ft), 1,000-metre-long (3,300 ft) Desjará Dam and the 25-metre-tall (82 ft), 1,100-metre-long (3,600 ft) Sauðárdalur Dam are saddle or auxiliary dams that maintain the desired height of the Hálslón Reservoir. Water from the 25-kilometre-long (16 mi), 2.1-cubic-kilometre (1,700,000 acre⋅ft) Hálslón Reservoir is diverted down a 39.7-kilometre-long (24.7 mi), 7.2–7.6-metre-diameter (24–25 ft) headrace tunnel towards the Fljótsdalur Power Station.

On the river Jökulsá í Fljótsdal, the 26-metre-tall (85 ft), 1,650-metre-long (5,410 ft) Kelduá Dam forms the 60-million-cubic-metre (2.1×10^{9} cu ft) Kelduárlón Reservoir. Downstream from the Kelduá Dam is the 37-metre-tall (121 ft), 620-metre-long (2,030 ft) Ufsarstífla dam which forms the Ufsarlón, a much smaller reservoir. Water from the Ufsarlón Reservoir is diverted down a 13.3-kilometre-long (8.3 mi), 6-metre-diameter (20 ft) headrace tunnel where it joins the Hálslón Reservoir headrace tunnel.

Before each of the headrace tunnels from the Hálslón Reservoir or Ufsarlón Reservoir reach the underground power station, they both join to form a single combined headrace tunnel. The single headrace tunnel later splits into two 800-metre-long (2,600 ft), 4-metre-diameter (13 ft) steel-lined penstocks (tunnels) and the water makes a rapid descent down a final 420-metre (1,380 ft) vertical penstock into the power station. The underground Fljótsdalur Power Station contains six vertical-axis Francis turbine generators rated at 115 MW each. The power station has a combined capacity of 690 MW and a discharge of 144 cubic metres per second (5,100 cu ft/s) (averages 110 cubic metres per second (3,900 cu ft/s)) into the river Jökulsá í Fljótsdal via tailrace tunnels and canals. The power production of 4,600 GWh/year corresponds to a capacity factor of 76%, which is relatively high for a hydroelectric facility. Power produced is then transmitted to Alcoa's Fjarðaál aluminium smelter 75 kilometres (47 mi) to the east in Reyðarfjörður.

=== Fjarðaál aluminium smelter ===
The Fjarðaál aluminium smelter was completed June 2007 and reached full operation in April 2008. Construction began in 2004 and the facility contains a smelter, cast house, rod production, and deep-water port. The smelter employs 450 people and produces 940 tonnes of aluminium a day, with capacity of 346,000 tonnes tons of aluminium per year. Fjarðaál means "Fjords Aluminium" in Icelandic.

== History ==
Using the rivers Jökulsá á Dal and Jökulsá í Fljótsdal along with other resources in eastern Iceland has been on the drawing board since the 1970s. From 1975 to 2002, several international companies had planned or attempted to build a metal plant at Reyðarfjörður that would be powered by a hydroelectricity project similar to the Kárahnjúkar. All failed because of opposition to the project until Alcoa along with the Government of Iceland and Landsvirkjun, Iceland's national power company committed to the massive project in 2002.

== Construction ==
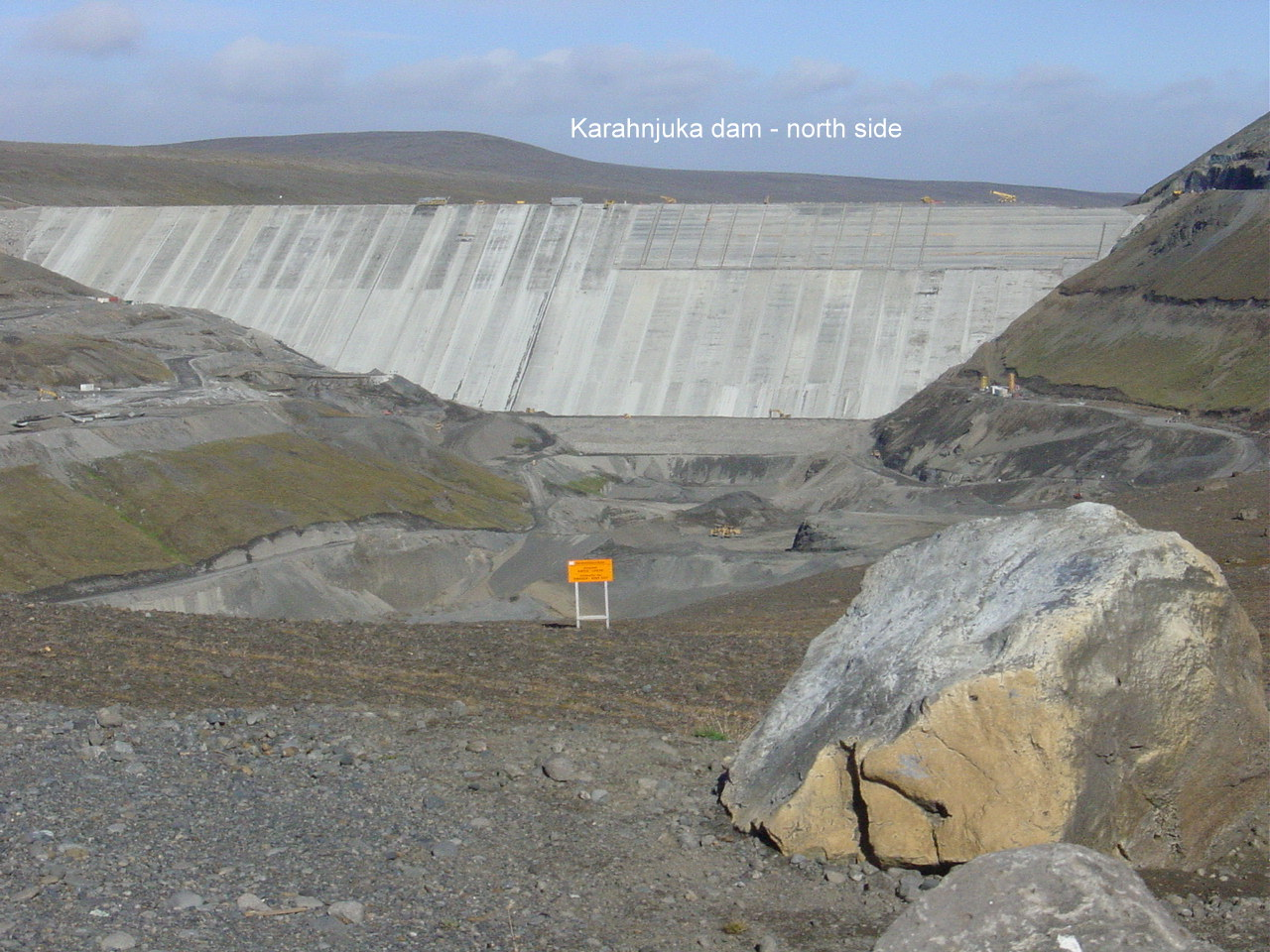
Construction of Kárahnjúkar Dam, concrete-face backside

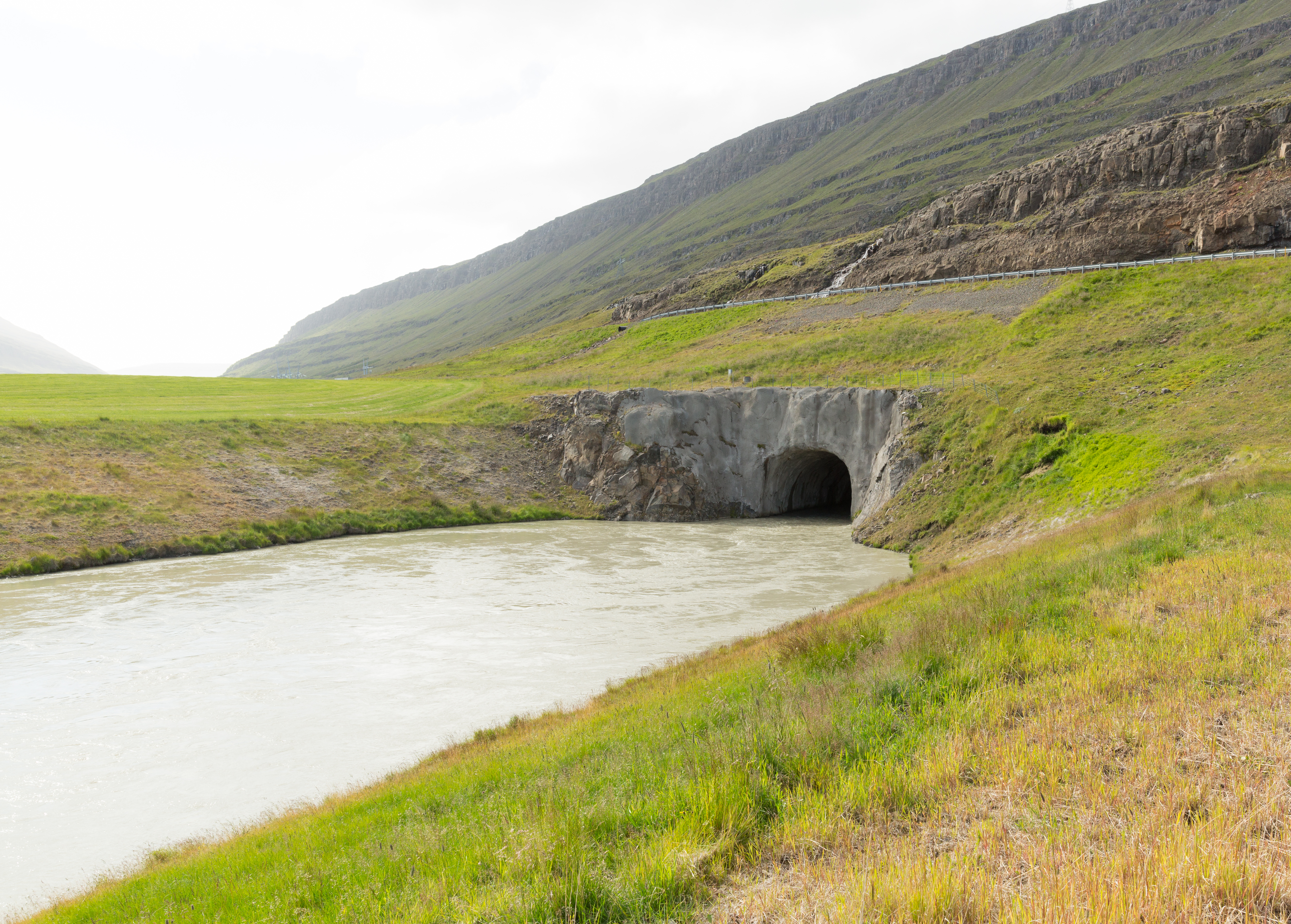
The end of the tunnel at Skriðuklaustur leading water from Kárahnjúkar Dam to the power plant.

The project is funded by Landsvirkjun, which operates the dams and Fljótsdalur Power Station. The Italian company Impregilo is the largest contractor working on the dams. The total cost of the hydropower project is US$1.3 billion. The penstock was built in place by the German company DSD-NOELL (Würzburg) whereas ATB Riva Calzoni of Italy provided intake structures, wheels gates, and sliding gates. In total, more than 4,000 tons of steel were used for the steel liner.

Preparatory work on the project began in August 2002 and construction on the Kárahnjúkar Dam and headrace tunnels for the Hálslón Reservoir began in April 2003. In September of the same year, construction began on the underground power station. Construction on both the Desjará Dam and the Sauðárdalur Dam began in April 2004. In June 2006, construction of the Kelduá Dam and Ufsarstífla Dam began and in September, the Hálslón Reservoir began to fill. In mid-2008, the Kelduá and Ufsarstífla Dams were complete and the Ufsarlón Reservoir headrace tunnel was ready.

Construction on the headrace tunnels was done by three full-face tunnel boring machines, while remaining areas were drilled and blasted. This was the first time that tunnel boring machines were used in Iceland.

There were several workplace fatalities during the construction process, including Arni Thor Bjarnason, Eilifur Gopi Hammond, Ludvik Alfred Halldorsson, and Kresimir Durinic.

== Protest concert ==
On 7 January 2006, a charity concert called Stop the Dams was held at Laugardalshöll in Reykjavik to protest the construction of the dam. The concert's profits went to a special fund for nature protection in Iceland. Over 6,000 people attended. Performers included Björk, Zeena Parkins, Múm, Damon Albarn, Ghostigital, KK, Sigur Rós, Egó, among others.

== Criticism ==
The dams have been the frequent subject of protests by environmentalists for many reasons. The area is within the second largest (formerly) unspoiled wilderness in Europe and covers about 1,000 square kilometres (390 sq mi) in total and the rivers that supply the project rise in Vatnajökull. About 70% of the workforce was composed of foreign workers. For the construction of the plant, five dams on two glacial rivers created three reservoirs, Hálslón (57 km^{2} (14,000 acres)), Kelduárlón (about 8 km^{2} (2,000 acres)) and Ufsarlón (about 1 km^{2} (250 acres)). Often described as the largest construction project in Icelandic history, it has been a sustained focus of protest over the loss of highland landscape. The area affected by changes to river flow is much larger, a report prepared for the environmental impact assessment put it at more than 2,000 square kilometres (770 sq mi) across the catchments of the Jökulsá á Dal and Jökulsá í Fljótsdal.

=== Representation in film and literature ===
The project as a whole was criticised heavily in the 2006 book Draumalandið and subsequent 2009 documentary Dreamland. The project was documented in a MegaStructures program of the National Geographic Channel, and the Discovery Channel's Extreme Engineering, along with mention in the 2006 Sigur Rós rockumentary Heima (At Home), where the band played at a protest against the building of the dam. The dam has been read as an inspiration for a mysterious dam in Steinar Bragi's horror novel Hálendið.

== See also ==
- Economy of Iceland
- Renewable energy in Iceland
- Hydroelectricity in Iceland
