= Mudcrack =

Pattern of cracks in dried muddy soil

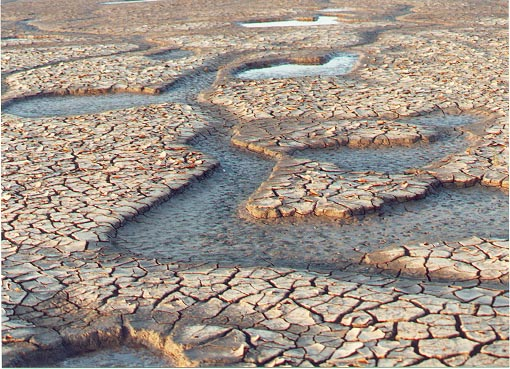
Fresh mudcracks on the shore of The Wash, England

Mudcracks (also known as mud cracks, desiccation cracks or cracked mud) are sedimentary structures formed as muddy sediment dries and contracts. Crack formation also occurs in clay-bearing soils as a result of a reduction in water content.

== Formation of mudcrack ==
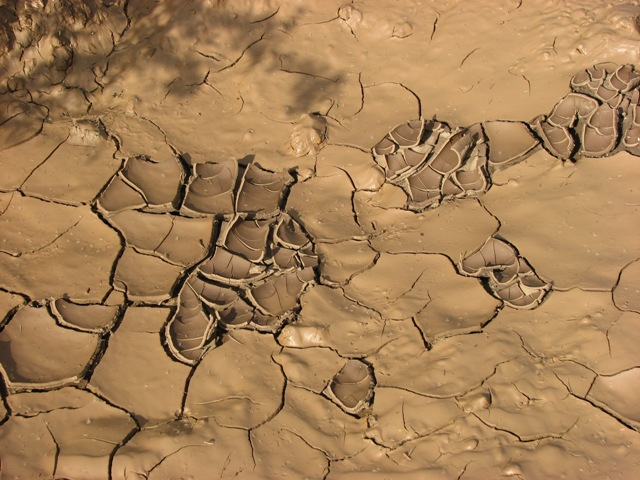
Top layer shrinks and curls up due to the strain

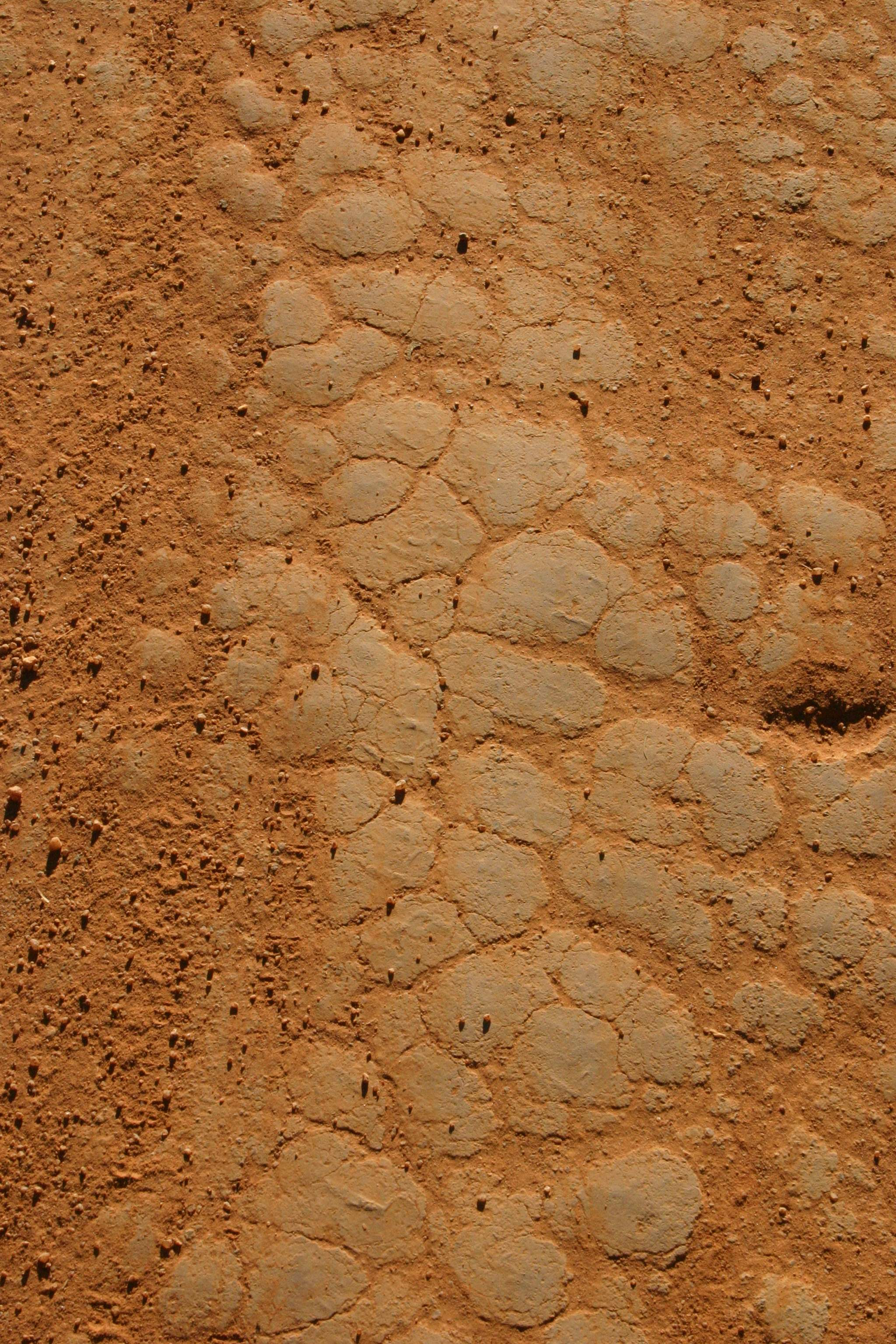
Crack pattern in clay exposed to the air

Naturally forming mudcracks start as wet, muddy sediment dries up and contracts. A strain is developed because the top layer shrinks while the material below stays the same size. When this strain becomes large enough, channel cracks form in the dried-up surface to relieve the strain. Individual cracks spread and join up, forming a polygonal, interconnected network of forms called "tesselations." If the strain continues to build, the polygons start to curl upwards. This characteristic can be used in geology to understand the original orientation of a rock. Cracks may later be filled with sediment and form casts over the base.

Typically, the initial crack pattern is dominated by T-shaped junctions. If a mudfield is repeatedly wetted and dried, it can be annealed to a pattern dominated by Y-shaped junctions, as it is thermodynamically favored like columnar jointing and polygonal patterned ground.

Syneresis cracks are broadly similar features that form from underwater shrinkage of muddy sediment caused by differences in salinity or chemical conditions, rather than aerial exposure and desiccation. Syneresis cracks can be distinguished from mudcracks because they tend to be discontinuous, sinuous, and trilete or spindle-shaped.

== Morphology and classification of mudcrack ==
Mudcracks are generally polygonal when seen from above and v-shaped in cross section. The "v" opens towards the top of the bed and the crack tapers downward. Allen (1982) proposed a classification scheme for mudcracks based on their completeness, orientation, shape, and type of infill.

=== Completeness of mudcrack ===
Complete mudcracks form an interconnected tessellating network. The connection of cracks often occurs when individual cracks join together forming a larger continuous crack. Incomplete mudcracks are not connected to each other but still form in the same region or location as the other cracks.

=== Plan-view geometry ===
Orthogonal intersections can have a preferred orientation or may be random. In oriented orthogonal cracks, the cracks are usually complete and bond to one another forming irregular polygonal shapes and often rows of irregular polygons. In random orthogonal cracks, the cracks are incomplete and unoriented therefore they do not connect or make any general shapes. Although they do not make general shapes they are not perfectly geometric. Non-orthogonal mudcracks have a geometric pattern. In uncompleted non-orthogonal cracks they form as a single three-point star shape that is composed of three cracks. They could also form with more than three cracks but three cracks in commonly considered the minimum. In completed non-orthogonal cracks, they form a very geometric pattern. The pattern resembles small polygonal shaped tiles in a repetitive pattern.

=== Mud curls ===
Mud curls form during one of the final stages in desiccation. Mud curls commonly occur on the exposed top layer of very thinly bedded mud rocks. When mud curls form, the water that is inside the sediment begins to evaporate causing the stratified layers to separate. The individual top layer is much weaker than multiple layers and is therefore able to contract and form curls as desiccation occurs. If transported by later currents, mud curls may be preserved as mud-chip rip-up clasts.

== Environments and substrates ==
Naturally occurring mudcracks form in sediment that was once saturated with water. Abandoned river channels, floodplain muds, and dried ponds are localities that form mudcracks. Mudcracks can also be indicative of a predominately sunny or shady environment of formation. Rapid drying, which occurs in sunny environments, results in widely spaced, irregular mudcracks, while closer spaced, more regular mudcracks indicate that they were formed in a shady place. Similar features also occur in frozen ground, lava flows (as columnar basalt), and igneous dykes and sills.

=== In technology ===
Polygonal crack networks similar to mudcracks can form in human-made materials such as ceramic glazes, paint film, and poorly made concrete. Mudcrack patterning at smaller scales can also be observed studied using technological thin films deposited using micro and nanotechnologies.

== Preservation of mudcrack ==
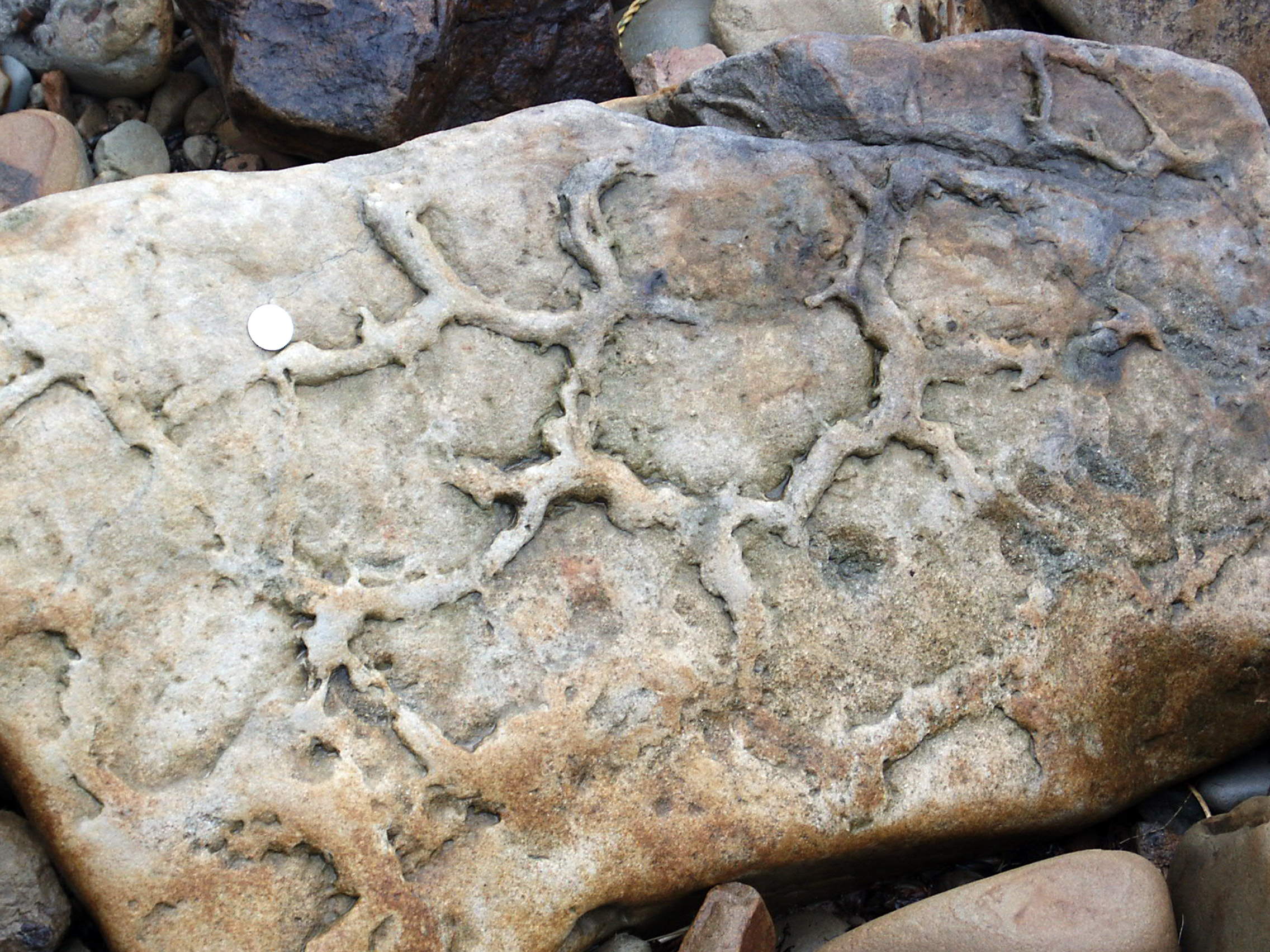
Ancient mudcracks preserved on the base of a bed of sandstone

Mudcracks can be preserved as v-shaped cracks on the top of a bed of muddy sediment or as casts on the base of the overlying bed. When they are preserved on the top of a bed, the cracks look as they did at the time of formation. When they are preserved on the bottom of the bedrock, the cracks are filled in with younger, overlying sediment. In most bottom-of-bed examples, the cracks are the part that sticks out most. Bottom-of-bed preservation occurs when mudcracks that have already formed and are completely dried are covered with fresh, wet sediment and are buried. Through burial and pressure, the new wet sediment is further pushed into the cracks, where it dries and hardens. The mudcracked rock is then later exposed to erosion. In these cases, the original mud cracks will erode faster than the newer material that fills the spaces. This type of mudcrack is used by geologists to determine the vertical orientation of rock samples that have been altered through folding or faulting.

== Gallery ==
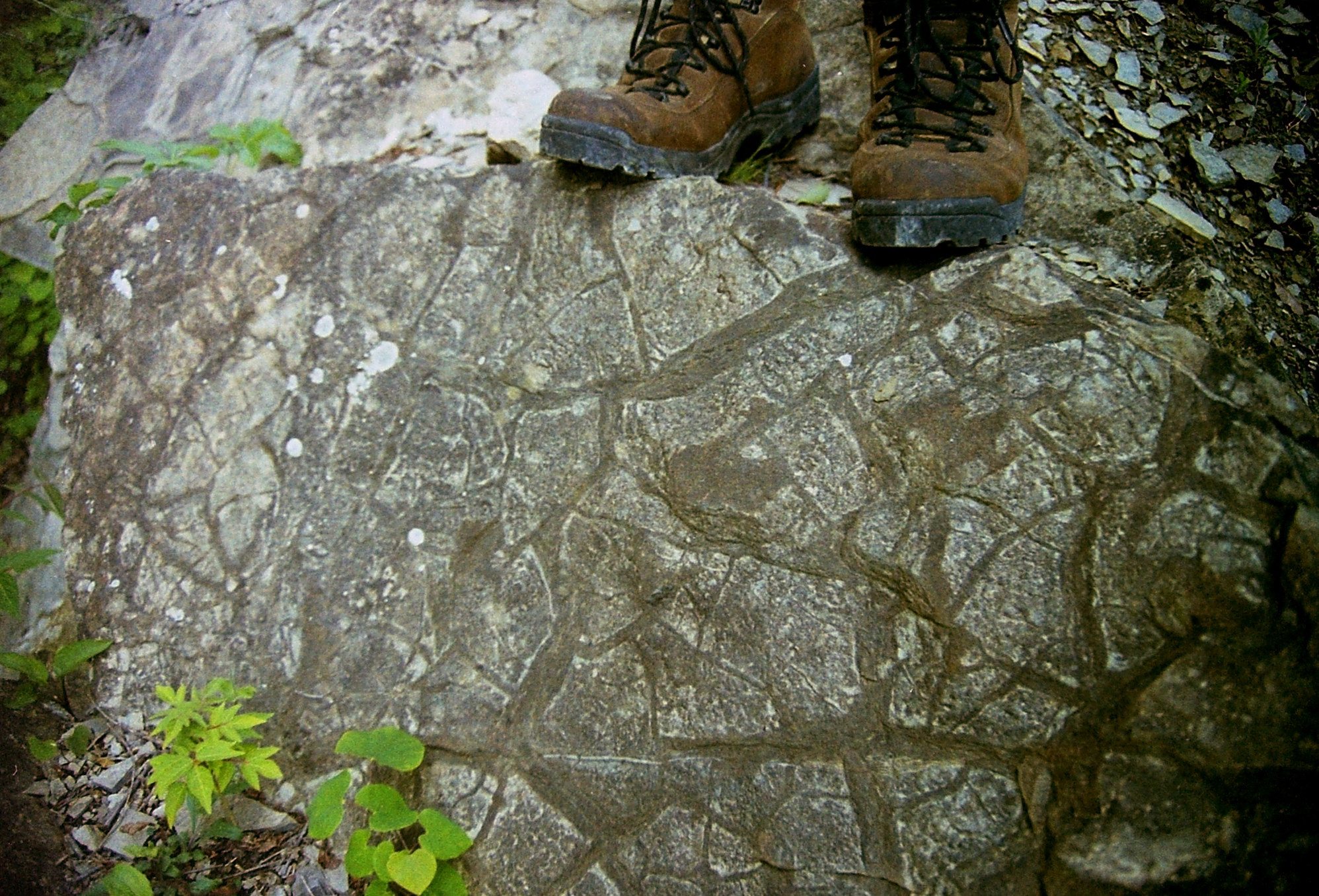
Bedding plane view of ancient mudcracks

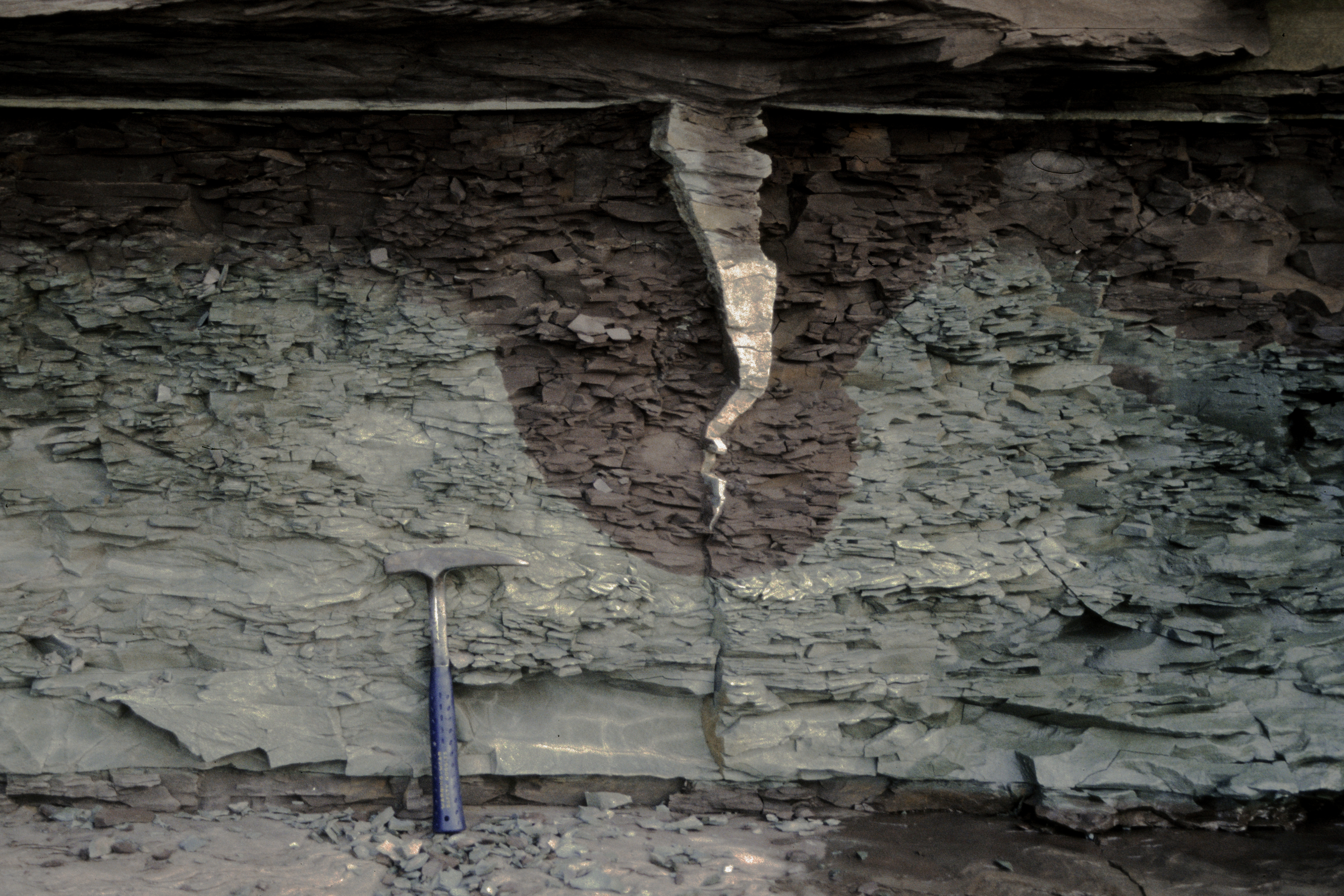
Cross-sectional view of ancient mudcrack

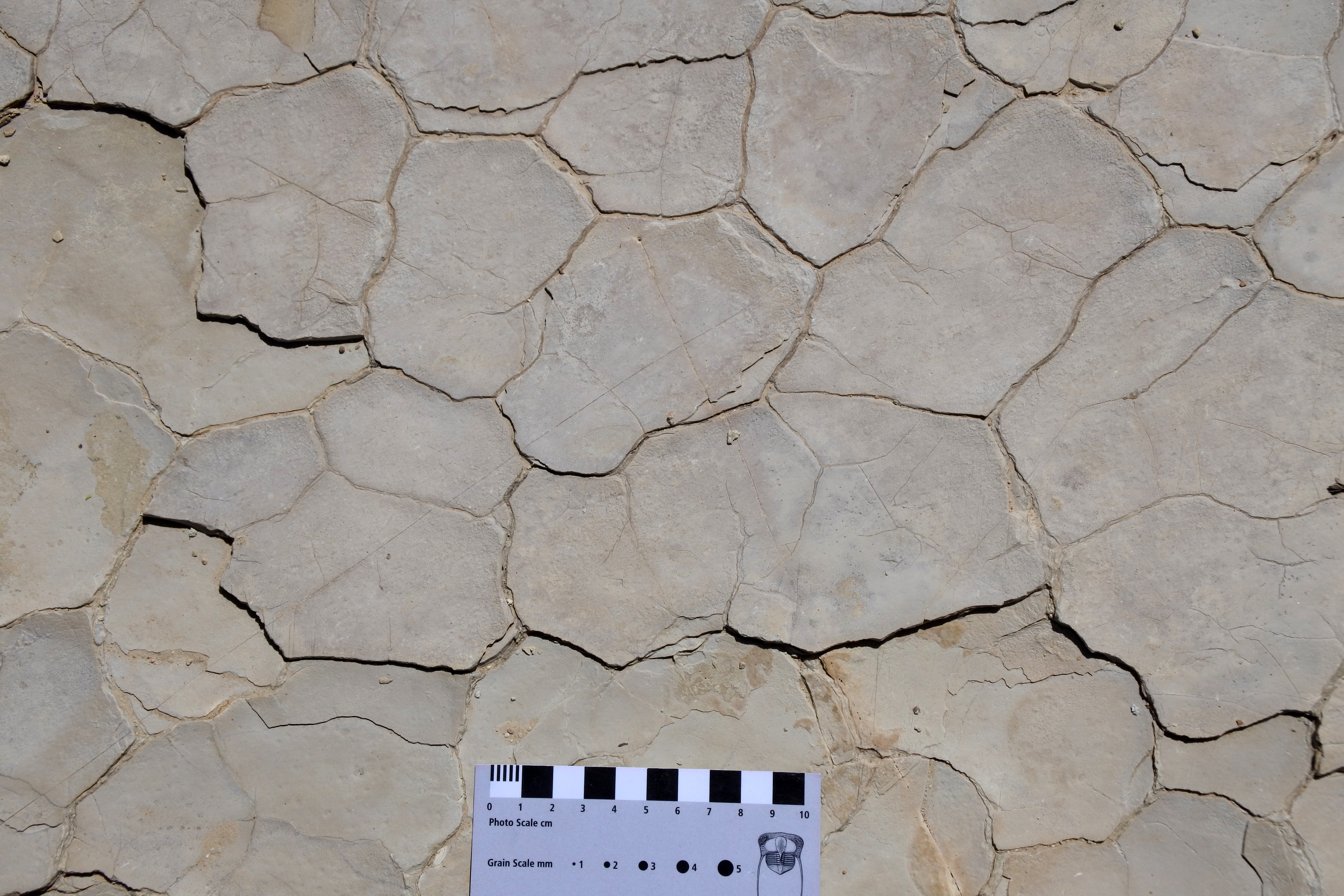
Mudcracks in the Carmel Formation (Middle Jurassic) near Gunlock, Utah.

== See also ==
- Ground fissure
- Syneresis crack, which occur in muds and can look very similar, without requiring subaerial exposure
- Craquelure, a similar phenomenon in paintings and ceramics
- Mud cracks on Mars
- Polygonal patterned ground
