= Syneresis crack =

Sedimentary structure caused by shrinkage

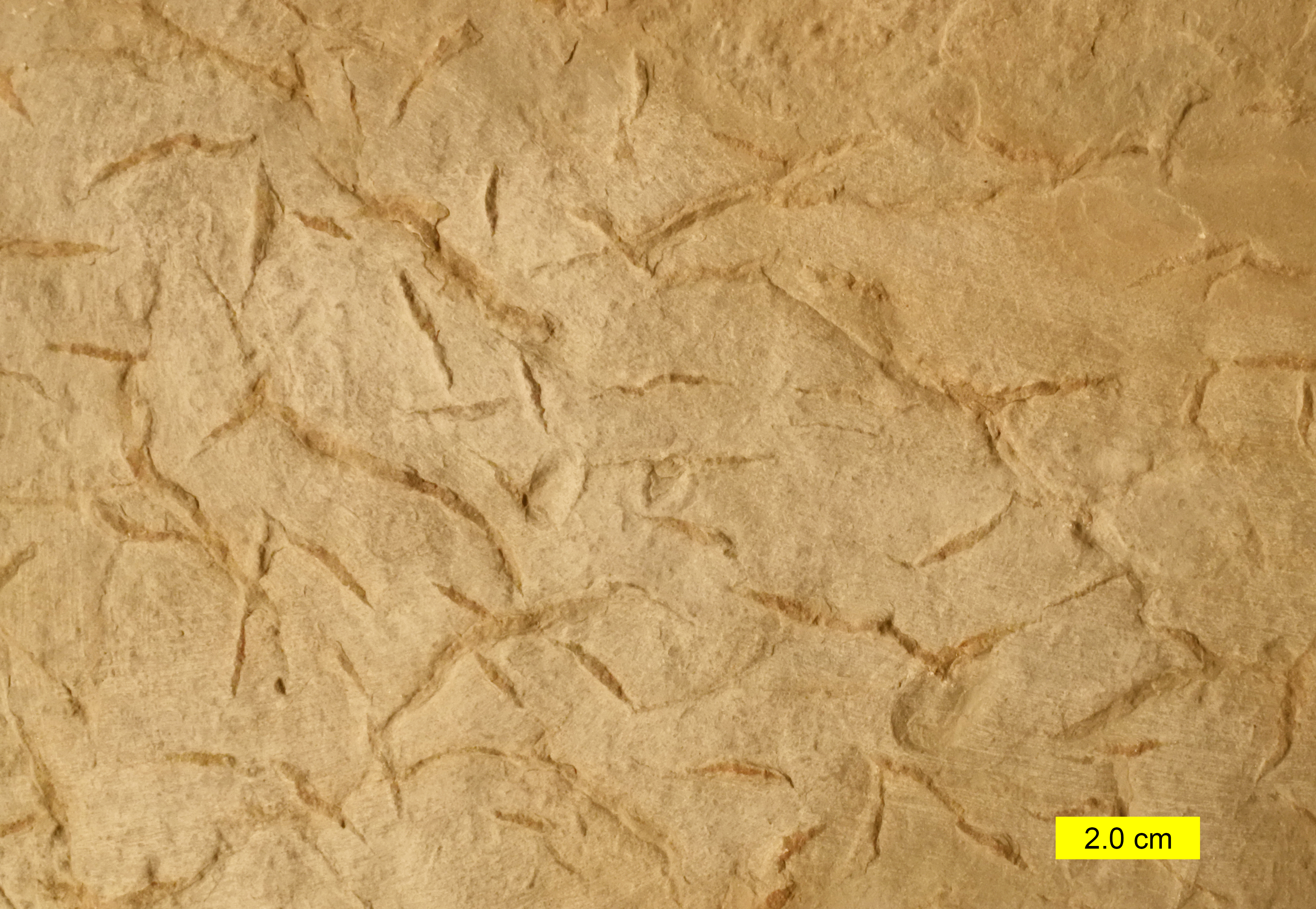
Syneresis cracks from the Drakes Formation (Upper Ordovician) of Adams County, Ohio, USA.

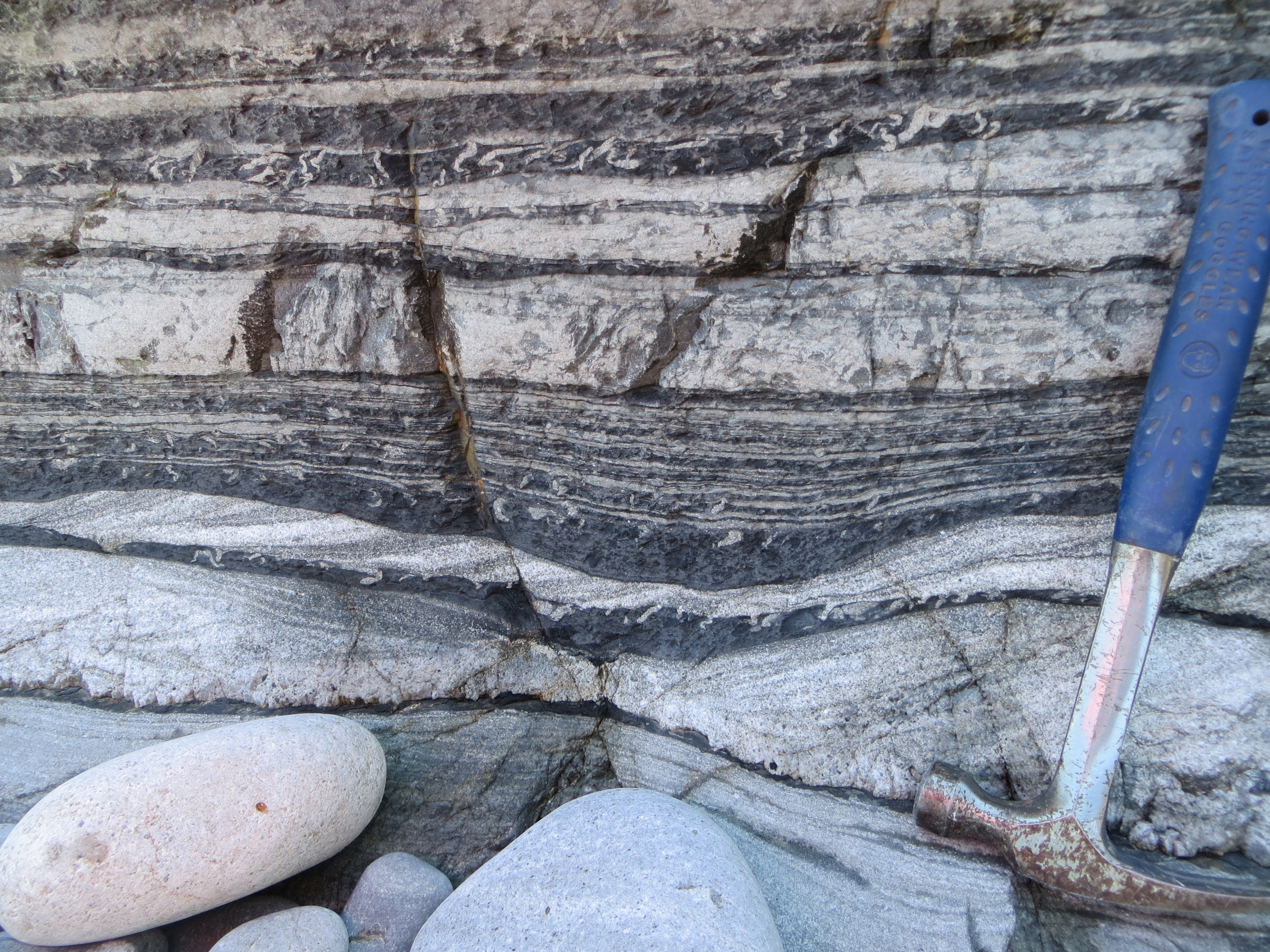
Syneresis cracks in lateral view in the Random Formation, Newfoundland and Labrador

Syneresis cracks (also known as subaqueous shrinkage cracks) are a sedimentary structure developed by the shrinkage of sediment without desiccation – not to be confused with desiccation cracks. Syneresis is the expulsion of a liquid from a gel-like substance. Syneresis cracks are formed by the contraction of clay in response to changes in the salinity of a liquid surrounding a deposit. The cracks can occur, for example, in mudstones deposited between two beds of sandstone. The markings would have been formed subaqueously on the bedding surface and could resemble desiccation mudcracks, but are not continuous and vary in shape. They commonly occur in thin mudstones interbedded with sandstones, as positive relief on the bottom of the sandstone, or as negative relief on the top of the mudstone. Subaqueous shrinkage cracks can develop on and through a surface that has been continuously covered in water. Syneresis cracks in some shales and lime mudstones may initially be preserved as small cavities, which then usually fill with silt and sand from either the overlying or underlying beds and laminae. Usually there is no pattern to the cracks, and they do not connect to form geometric shapes. Rather they are discontinuous and shaped in one of the following categories:

- polygonal - a closed plane figure, having three or more, usually straight, sides.
- sinuous - having many curves, bends, or turns.
- spindle - thickest in the middle and tapering at both ends.

A cross section of any of these would reveal that they are U- or V-shaped.

== Desiccation v. syneresis ==
Some crack patterns resemble subaerial desiccation cracks (mudcracks), which in turn has caused some confusion as to the differences between desiccation cracks and syneresis cracks.

Desiccation mudcracks are usually continuous, polygonal, and have U- or V-shaped cross sections that would have been filled in with sediment from above. Syneresis cracks, however, are usually discontinuous, spindle or sinuous in shape, and have U- or V-shaped cross sections that have been filled in with sediment from above or below.

== Experimental work ==
Experimental investigation of subaqueously formed syneresis cracks has usually been carried out in one of two ways. One way to induce cracking was by sedimentation from a saline solution and a non-swelling clay. However, when freshwater was used, no cracking could be induced in non-swelling clays, although in mud containing as little as two percent swelling clay, cracking was easily induced when salinity changes were introduced to the surrounding water.
