= Syneresis (chemistry) =

Extraction or expulsion of a liquid from a gel

Syneresis (also spelled 'synæresis' or 'synaeresis'), in chemistry, is the extraction or expulsion of a liquid from a gel, such as when serum drains from a contracting clot of blood. Another example of syneresis is the collection of whey on the surface of yogurt. Syneresis can also be observed when the amount of diluent in a swollen polymer exceeds the solubility limit as the temperature changes. A household example of this is the counterintuitive expulsion of water from dry gelatin when the temperature increases. Syneresis has also been proposed as the mechanism of formation for the amorphous silica composing the frustule of diatoms.

== Examples ==
In the processing of dairy milk, for example during cheese making, syneresis is the formation of the curd due to the sudden removal of the hydrophilic macropeptides, which causes an imbalance in intermolecular forces. Bonds between hydrophobic sites start to develop and are enforced by calcium bonds, which form as the water molecules in the micelles start to leave the structure. This process is usually referred to as the phase of coagulation and syneresis. The splitting of the bond between residues 105 and 106 in the κ-casein molecule is often called the primary phase of the rennet action, while the phase of coagulation and syneresis is referred to as the secondary phase.

In cooking, syneresis is the sudden release of moisture contained within protein molecules, usually caused by excessive heat, which over-hardens the protective shell. Moisture inside expands upon heating. The hard protein shell pops, expelling the moisture.

This process is responsible for transforming juicy rare steak into dry steak when cooked thoroughly. It creates weeping in scrambled eggs, with dry protein curd swimming in the released moisture. It also causes emulsified sauces, such as hollandaise, to "break" ("split"). Additionally, it creates unsightly moisture pockets within baked custard dishes, such as flan or crème brûlée.

Gels formed from agarose are prone to syneresis, and the degree of syneresis is inversely proportional to the concentration of the agarose in the gels.

In dentistry, syneresis is the expulsion of water or other liquid molecules from dental impression materials (for instance, alginate) after an impression has been taken. Due to this process, the impression shrinks a little and therefore its size is no longer accurate. For this reason, many dental impression companies strongly recommend to pour the dental cast as soon as possible to prevent distortion of the dimension of the teeth and objects in the impression.

The opposite process of syneresis is imbibition, which is the process of a material absorbing water molecules from the surroundings. Alginate also demonstrates imbibition because it will absorb water if soaked in it.

== See also ==
- Coagulation
- Flocculation
