= Icelandic Literary Prize =

Iceland literary award since 1989

- Native name: Íslensku bókmenntaverðlaunin
- Description: Annual literary award presented in three categories by the Icelandic Publishers Association
- Country: Iceland
- Presented by: Icelandic Publishers Association

The Icelandic Literary Prize (Icelandic: Íslensku bókmenntaverðlaunin), or Icelandic Literary Award, is an award which is given to three books each year by the Icelandic Publishers Association.

== History ==
The prize was founded on the association's centennial in 1989. One award is for fiction or poetry (fagurbókmenntir), one for academic and non-fiction works (fræðirit og rit almenns efnis), and, since 2013, one for children's and young-adult books. Five books are nominated in each category, and the year's nominations are publicized in the beginning of December, but the prize itself is not awarded until January. Because the year's nominations come in the middle of the Christmas book flood, these books receive a great deal of marketing. Once the books have been nominated, the Icelandic Publishers Association appoints a selection committee which chooses the winners.

== List of winners of the Icelandic Literary Prize for fiction ==
Year	Winner	Title (English)	Title (Icelandic)	Notes
1989	Stefán Hörður Grímsson		Yfir heiðan morgun: ljóð '87-'89	
1990	Fríða Á. Sigurðardóttir	Through the Night	Meðan nóttin líður	
1991	Guðbergur Bergsson	The Swan	Svanurinn	
1992	Þorsteinn frá Hamri	The Sleeping Sailor	Sæfarinn sofandi	
1993	Hannes Pétursson		Eldhylur	
1994	Vigdís Grímsdóttir		Grandavegur 7	
1995	Steinunn Sigurðardóttir	Heart Place	Hjartastaður	
1996	Böðvar Guðmundsson	Tree of Life	Lífsins tré	
1997	Guðbergur Bergsson		Faðir og móðir og dulmagn bernskunnar: skáldævisaga	
1998	Thor Vilhjálmsson		Morgunþula í stráum	
1999	Andri Snær Magnason	The Story of the Blue Planet	Sagan af bláa hnettinum	
2000	Gyrðir Elíasson		Gula húsið	
2001	Hallgrímur Helgason	The Author of Iceland	Höfundur Íslands	
2002	Ingibjörg Haraldsdóttir		Hvar sem ég verð	
2003	Ólafur Gunnarsson		Öxin og jörðin	
2004	Auður Jónsdóttir	The People in the Basement	Fólkið í kjallaranum	
2005	Jón Kalman Stefánsson	Summer Light and Then Comes the Night	Sumarljós og svo kemur nóttin	
2006	Ólafur Jóhann Ólafsson	Valentines	Aldingarðurinn	
2007	Sigurður Pálsson		Minnisbók	
2008	Einar Kárason		Ofsi	
2009	Guðmundur Óskarsson		Bankster	
2010	Gerður Kristný	Bloodhoof	Blóðhófnir	
2011	Guðrún Eva Mínervudóttir		Allt með kossi vekur	
2012	Eiríkur Örn Norðdahl	Evil	Illska	
2013	Sjón		Mánasteinn – drengurinn sem aldrei var til	
2014	Ófeigur Sigurðsson	Oraefi: The Wasteland	Öræfi	
2015	Einar Már Guðmundsson		Hundadagar	
2016	Auður Ava Ólafsdóttir	Hotel Silence	Ör	
2017	Kristín Eiríksdóttir		Elín, ýmislegt	
2018	Hallgrímur Helgason	Sixty kilos of sunshine	Sextíu kíló af sólskini	
2019	Sölvi Björn Sigurðsson		Selta - Apókrýfa úr ævi landlæknis	
2020	Elísabet Kristín Jökulsdóttir		Aprílsólarkuldi	
2021	Hallgrímur Helgason	Sixty kilos of knockouts	Sextíu kíló af kjaftshöggum	
2022	Pedro Gunnlaugur Garcia	Lungs	Lungu	

== List of winners of the Icelandic Literary Prize for children's books ==
Year	Winner	Title (English)	Title (Icelandic)	Notes
2013	Andri Snær Magnason	The Casket of Time	Tímakistan	
2014	Bryndís Björgvinsdóttir	The Local Joke	Hafnfirðingabrandarinn	
2015	Gunnar Helgason	My Bonkers Mum	Mamma klikk!	
2016	Hildur Knútsdóttir	Winter Frost	Vetrarhörkur	
2017	Áslaug Jónsdóttir, Rakel Helmsdal, Kalle Güettler	Monsters in Trouble	Skrímsli í vanda	
2018	Sigrún Eldjárn	The Silver Key	Silfurlykillinn	
2019	Bergrún Íris Sævarsdóttir	Forever a Friend	Langelstur að eilífu	
2020	Arndís Þórarinsdóttir and Hulda Sigrún Bjarnadóttir		Blokkin á heimsenda	
2021	Þórunn Rakel Gylfadóttir		Akam, ég og Annika	
2022	Arndís Þórarinsdóttir	Somersault	Kollhnís	

== List of winners of the Icelandic Literary Prize for academic works ==
Year	Winner	Title (English)	Title (Icelandic)	Notes
1993	Jón G. Friðjónsson		Mergur málsins : íslensk orðatiltæki: uppruni, saga og notkun	
1994	Silja Aðalsteinsdóttir		Skáldið sem sólin kyssti : ævisaga Guðmundar Böðvarssonar	
1995	Þór Whitehead		Milli vonar og ótta	
1996	Þorsteinn Gylfason	Thinking in Icelandic	Að hugsa á íslensku	
1997	Guðjón Friðriksson		Einar Benediktsson	
1998	Hörður Ágústsson		Íslensk byggingararfleifð I: ágrip af húsagerðarsögu 1750–1940	
1999	Páll Valsson		Jónas Hallgrímsson	
2000	Guðmundur Páll Ólafsson		Hálendið í náttúru Íslands	
2001	Sigríður Dúna Kristmundsdóttir		Björg	
2002	Páll Hersteinsson, Pétur M. Jónasson		Þingvallavatn	
2003	Guðjón Friðriksson		Jón Sigurðsson, ævisaga II	
2004	Halldór Guðmundsson		Halldór Laxness–ævisaga	
2005	Kristín B. Guðnadóttir, Gylfi Gíslason, Arthur Danto, Matthías Johannessen, Silja Aðalsteinsdóttir		Kjarval	
2006	Andri Snær Magnason	Dreamland: A Self-Help Manual for a Frightened Nation	Draumalandið–sjálfshjálparbók handa hræddri þjóð	
2007	Þorsteinn Þorsteinsson		Ljóðhús. Þættir um skáldskap Sigfúsar Daðasonar	
2008	Þorvaldur Kristinsson		Lárus Pálsson leikari	
2009	Helgi Björnsson		Jöklar á Íslandi	
2010	Helgi Hallgrímsson	The Mushroom Book	Sveppabókin	
2011	Páll Björnsson		Jón forseti allur? Táknmynd þjóðhetju frá andláti til samtíðar	
2012	Gunnar F. Guðmundsson		Pater Jón Sveinsson: Nonni	
2013	Guðbjörg Kristjánsdóttir		Íslenska teiknibókin	
2014	Snorri Baldursson		Lífríki Íslands: vistkerfi lands og sjávar	
2015	Gunnar Þór Bjarnason		Þegar siðmenningin fór fjandans til - Íslendingar og stríðið mikla 1914 - 1918	
2016	Ragnar Axelsson		Andlit norðursins	
2017	Unnur Þóra Jökulsdóttir		Undur Mývatns: - um fugla, flugur, fiska og fólk	
2018	Hörður Kristinsson, Jón Baldur Hlíðberg, Þóra Ellen Þórhallsdóttir		Flóra Íslands	
2019	Jón Viðar Jónsson		Stjörnur og stórveldi á leiksviðum Reykjavíkur 1925 - 1965	
2020	Sumarliði R. Ísleifsson		Í fjarska norðursins: Ísland og Grænland – viðhorfasaga í þúsund ár	
2021	Sigrún Helgadóttir		Mynd af manni I-II	
2022	Ragnar Stefánsson	When Is the Big One Coming: Predicting Earthquakes	Hvenær kemur sá stóri: Að spá fyrir um jarðskjálfta	

== See also ==
- Icelandic literature
- Nordic Council's Literature Prize
