= Wira Pdika =

Wira Pdika (or, in Odia, Matiro Poko, Company Loko, both meaning 'Earth Worm, Company man') is a 124-minute 2005 film independently produced and directed by Samarendra Das and Amarendra Das, characterised by the reviewer Subrat Kumar Sahu as 'a milestone in terms of authenticity in documentary filmmaking'.

It is in the Kui language and documents the struggles of Adivasi people in Odisha against mining of bauxite in their region. The documentary sits in the work of Samarendra Das alongside his academic book, co-authored with Felix Padel, Out of This Earth: East India Adivasis and the Aluminium Cartel (to which it also provides the image on the cover).

== Contents ==
The film includes no narration—only footage of people from the communities of the Dongria Khonds and Majhi Khonds in the Niyamgiri region of Odisha. Interviewees discuss the impact on their lives of bauxite mining by a number of companies (among them Vedanta Resources) that began in the 1990s, and their resistance to these activities. In the assessment of Kalpana Wilson, 'the film does not make claims to present an ‘unbiased’ view of events; on the contrary, it is an example of politically committed filmmaking seeking to produce work which can be widely used as a tool in the struggle. A key theme of the film is the interviewees' view that the mining discussed is not achieving economic development of their communities but plundering them, and that they instead seek sustainable development. Meanwhile, the documentary differs from some other media coverage of the struggle over mining in the Niyamgiri hills in avoiding stereotyping the Adivasi people involved as noble savages.

== Influence ==
The movement that the movie chronicles succeeded in stopping Vedanta's bauxite mining in the Niyamgiri hills in 2013, causing the firm to lose up to $10 billion (US) in revenue. However, as of 2017, indigenous people's struggles against the corporation in India and elsewhere continued.

Clips from the film have a prominent place in the Icelandic documentary Draumalandið, about aluminium smelting in Iceland.

Interviews in the documentary are cited as primary sources by a number of scholars.
