= Gerður Kristný =

Icelandic writer

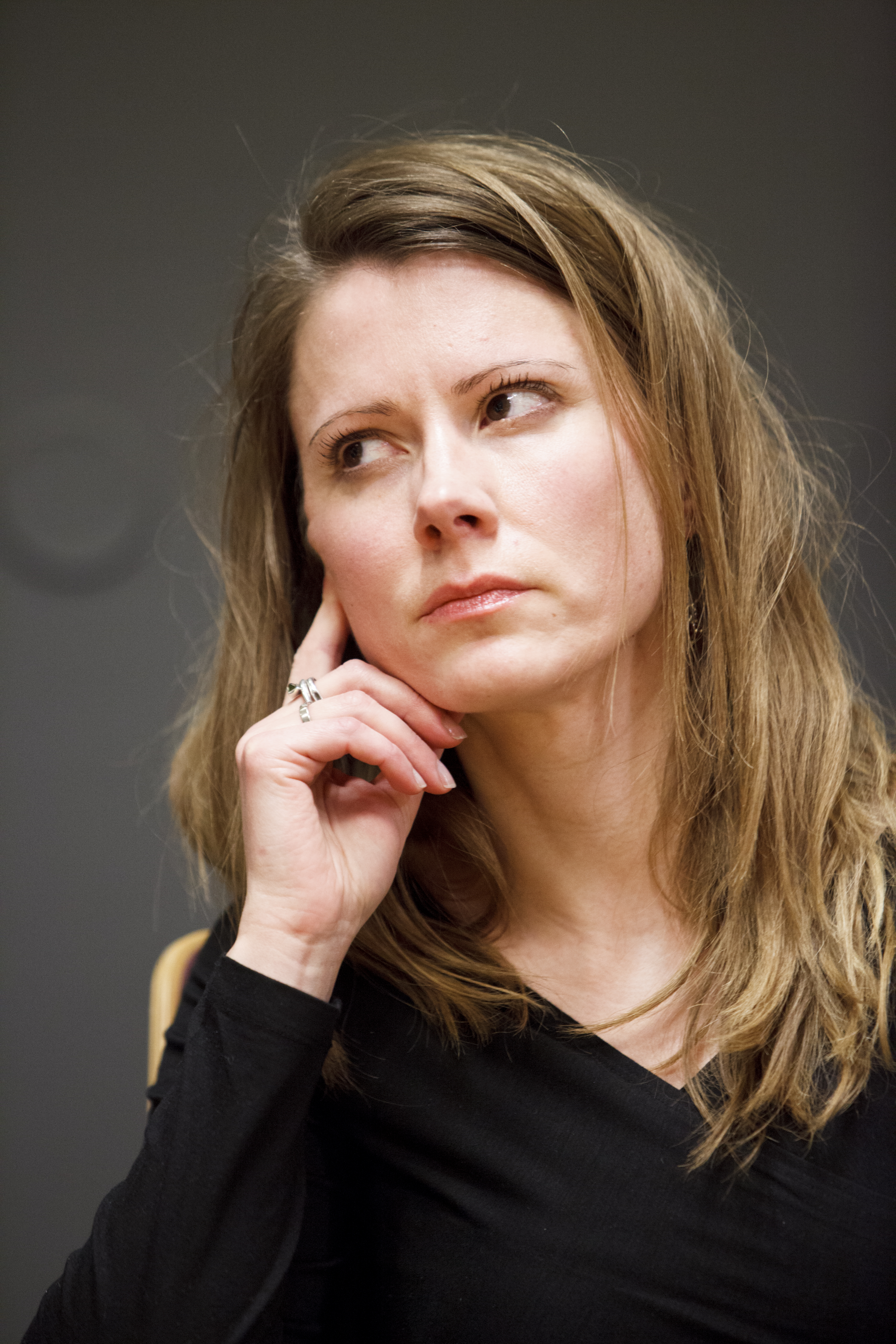
- Gerður Kristný at the Nordic Council Literature Prize 2012
- Born: 10 June 1970 (age 56)
- Writing career
- Genre: poetry
- Notable awards: Icelandic Literary Prize, The Icelandic Children's Choice Award, Halldór Laxness Literature Prize, Jónas Hallgrímsson Award

Gerður Kristný (born 1970) is an Icelandic writer who is best known for her poetry and books for children.

== Early life ==
Gerður Kristný was born on 10 June 1970 and brought up in Reykjavík. She graduated in French and comparative literature from the University of Iceland in 1992 with a BA thesis on Charles Baudelaire’s Les Fleurs du Mal. Before becoming a full-time writer, she trained at Danish Radio TV.

== Career ==
Gerður Kristný was editor of the magazine Mannlíf from 1998 to 2004 and wrote numerous books for children, short stories, and poetry during the same time. In 2005, she published the biography Myndin af pabba: Saga Thelmu (A Portrait of Dad: Thelma's Story), which tells the story of a group of sisters' experiences of sexual abuse at the hands of their father in the 1960s and 70s.

In 2010, she published the book-length poem Blóðhófnir (Bloodhoof), which is based on an ancient Nordic myth, told primarily in the Eddic poem Skírnismál. The Eddic poem depicts the god Freyr's efforts using his servant Skírnir to fetch the poet's namesake, the giantess Gerðr Gymisdóttir, from her far away home to satisfy his lustful desire through his servant. Gerður Kristný's poem recounts the same events from the perspective and in the words of the giantess alone. In this respect, Blóðhófnir coincides with feminist scholarship that challenge traditional interpretations of the Eddic poem. It also depicts the eventual meeting between Freyr and Gerðr, which never takes place in the Eddic poem. Together with Drápa and Sálumessan, published in 2014 and 2018, respectively, Blóðhófnir constitutes the first part of a trilogy of poems concerning gender-based violence.

Gerður Kristný travels regularly around the world to present her work, giving readings in places like Kampala, Cox's Bazar, Java, Maastricht and Colgata. In 2014, she participated in the International Writing Program's Fall Residency at the University of Iowa in Iowa City, IA. In 2021, she premiered a poem commemorating the University of Iceland's 110th anniversary.

== Awards and honors ==
Gerður Kristný received the Icelandic Children's Choice Book Prize (bókaverðlaun barnanna) in 2003 for her book Marta Smarta (Smart Marta) and the Halldór Laxness Literature Prize in 2004 for her novel Bátur með segli og allt (A Boat With a Sail and All). In 2005, she received the Icelandic Journalism Award for her biography Myndin af pabba: Saga Thelmu, and her collection of poetry, Höggstaður (Soft Spot), was nominated for the Icelandic Literary Prize in 2007.

In 2010, Gerður Kristný won both the West Nordic Council's Children and Young People's Literature Prize in 2010 for the novel Garðurinn (The Garden) and the Icelandic Literary Prize for her book of poetry Blóðhófnir. The latter was also nominated to the Nordic Council Literature Prize in 2011, the same year Gerður Kristný delivered the Sigurður Nordal lecture at the Árni Magnússon Institute for Icelandic Studies. She received the Jónas Hallgrímsson Award in 2020 in recognition of her contributions to the enrichment of the Icelandic language.

== Adaptations ==
Gerður Kristný's play Ballið á Bessastöðum (The Bessastaðir Ball), which she adapted from her own children's book, premiered in the Icelandic National Theater in Reykjavík in February 2011 and was acclaimed by the public and critics alike.

Blóðhófnir has twice been adapted for musical performance: as a chamber opera by Kristín Þóra Haraldsdóttir with visuals by Tinna Kristjánsdóttir, and as dramatic composition interweaving contemporary chamber music with Nordic folk music by Karin Rehnqvist.

== Family ==
Gerður Kristný lives in Reykjavík with her husband and two sons.

== Works ==
- Iðunn og afi pönk, Mál og Menning, 2020, ISBN 9789979342380
- Heimskaut, Mál og Menning, 2019, ISBN 9789979340973
- Sálumessa, Mál og Menning, 2018, ISBN 9789979338802
- Smartís, Mál og Menning, 2017, ISBN 9789979338802
- Hestvík, Mál og Menning, 2016, ISBN 9979337060
- Drápa, Mál og Menning, 2014, ISBN 9789979334828
- Ljóðasafn, Mál og Menning, 2014, ISBN 9789979334347
- Strandir, Mál og Menning, 2012, ISBN 9789979333111
- Forsetinn, prinsessan og höllin sem svaf, Mál og menning, 2011, ISBN 9789979332756
- Blóðhófnir, Mál og Menning, 2010, ISBN 9789979331872
- Prinsessan á Bessastöðum, Mál og menning, 2009, ISBN 9789979331148
- Garðurinn , Mál og Menning, 2008, ISBN 9789979330110
- Höggstaður, Mál og Menning, 2007, ISBN 9789979328780
- Ballið á Bessastöðum, Mál og menning, 2007, ISBN 9979329084
- Land hinna týndu sokka, Mál og Menning, 2006 ISBN 9979327847
- Myndin af pabba - Saga Thelmu Vaka-Helgafell, 2005 ISBN 9979218894
- Bátur með segli og allt, Vaka-Helgafell, 2004, ISBN 9789979218821
- Jóladýrin, Mál og Menning, 2004, ISBN 9979325526
- Ég veit þú kemur: Þjóðhátíð í Vestmannaeyjum 2002, Mál og Menning, 2002, ISBN 9979323620
- Marta smarta, Mál og Menning, 2002, ISBN 9979323361
- Launkofi, Mál og Menning, 2000, ISBN 9789979321040
- Eitruð epli, Mál og Menning, 1998, ISBN 9979323760
- Regnbogi í póstinum, Mál og Menning, 1996, ISBN 9979314109
- Ísfrétt, Mál og menning, 1994, ISBN 9789979306412

== Works in English ==
- Sewing Sisters
- Poems in NorthWords
- Bloodhoof, Translated by Rory McTurk, Arc Pub., 2012, ISBN 9781908376107
- Drápa - A Reykjavík Murder Mystery, Translated by Rory McTurk, Arc Pub., 2018, ISBN 9781911469261
- Reykjavik Requiem, Translated by Rory McTurk, Arc Pub., 2020, ISBN 9781910345016
