= International Family Planning and Development =

International family planning programs aim to provide women around the world, especially in developing countries, with contraceptive and reproductive services that allow them to avoid unintended pregnancies and control their reproductive choices.

In 2018, the World Health Organization (WHO) estimated that around 214 million women around the world wanted to avoid pregnancy but were not currently using any method of contraception or family planning. Family planning programs, especially in terms of development, seek to promote women making autonomous reproductive choices about the size of their family, the spacing, and overall health of women and children. Studies show that reducing the number of unintended pregnancies not only reduces the number of abortions but also lowers the number of maternal and infant deaths associated with the risks of childbirth.

In addition to reducing the number of unintended pregnancies, family planning programs run by organizations like United States Agency for International Development (USAID), the United Nations Population Fund (UNFPA), and the Bill & Melinda Gates Foundation work to reduce high fertility in developing countries and increase overall health standards for women and children to order to negate the burdens unintended pregnancies, high fertility rate, and infant and maternal mortality have on countries in the global South.

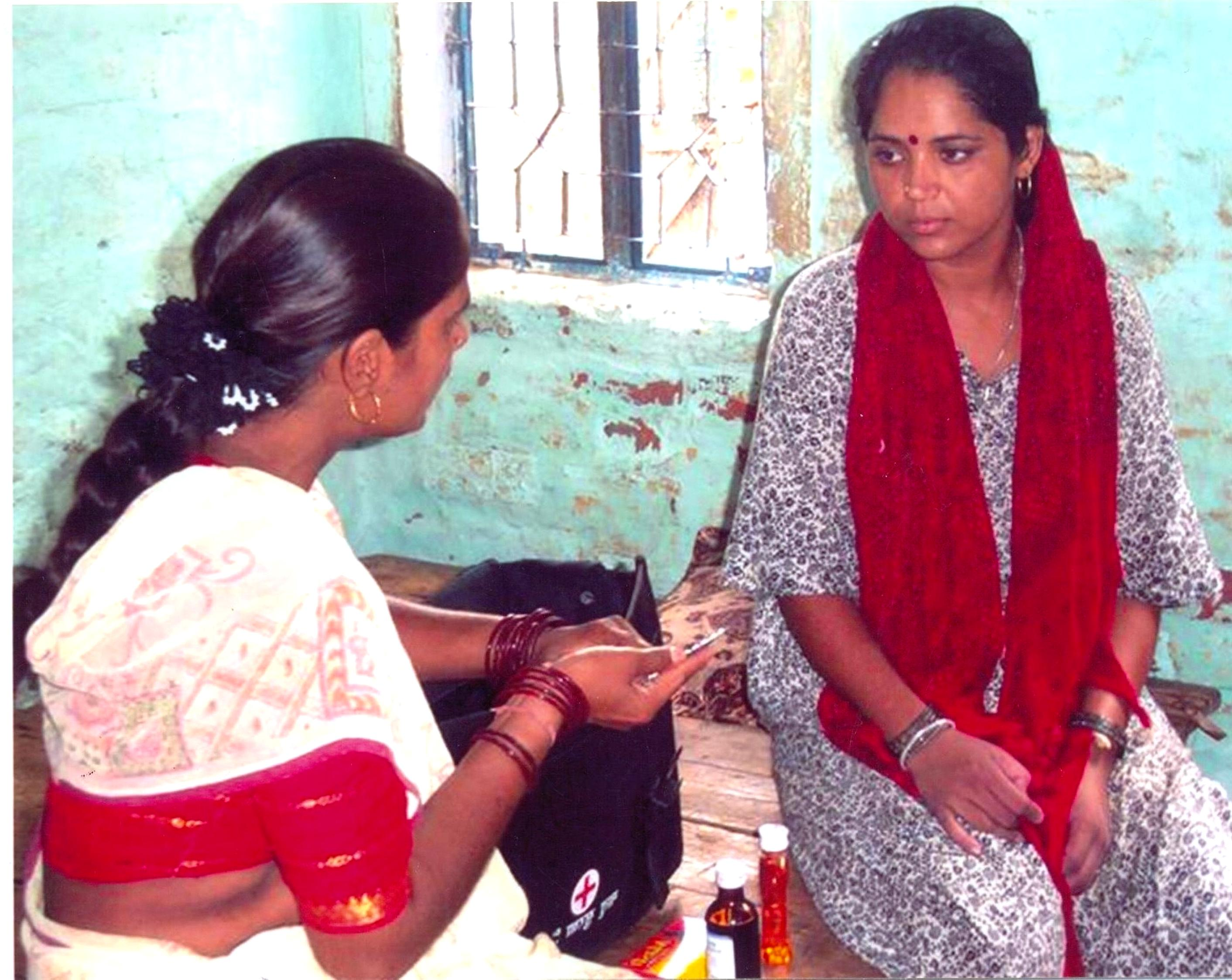
A family planning project in India increases access to family planning and contraceptives to Indian women.

== Overview of Modern International Planning ==
The start of family planning as a formal tool of international development traces it origins to May 13, 1968, when the International Conference on Human Rights issued what became known as the Proclamation of Teheran. The Teheran Proclamation stated that for parents, being able to choose how many children they want to have and to choose the spacing of those children is a basic human right. While the importance of family planning had been known to the women it affected the most, it was not until the 1968 conference that family planning was seen as the obligations of countries and governments around the world. Family planning was and still is seen as a tool to not only help lower overall global fertility rates but also aid increasing the economic and social development in many countries, particularly in developing nations by lowering health risks associated with pregnancy and childbirth to women and children. Unintended pregnancies and high fertility rates can affect everything from quality of life, nutrition standards, access to education and economic opportunities and even access to scarce resources such as food and water for women and children. Family planning programs seek to give women of child-bearing age an opportunity to make their own reproductive choices. In 2017, an estimated $1.27 billion was raised for family planning programs worldwide. Partnerships such as Family Planning 2020 (FP2020), an international coalition jointly operating by the Bill & Melinda Gates Foundation, the United Nations and the governments of the UK and the US, seek to increase the availability of contraceptives to women who would otherwise not have access to them.

== Benefits of Family Planning in Developing Countries ==
International family planning programs as a part of development plans can have many positive benefits for women and the communities they serve. The Guttmacher Institute noted in a recent study that investment in contraceptive and maternal healthcare programs can not only significantly decrease the number of unintended pregnancies worldwide but also unplanned births and induced and unsafe abortions. Other studies have similarly shown that family planning programs can reduce the maternal mortality rate associated with childbirth. The maternal death rate in developing countries is much higher than in developed countries. Additionally, family planning programs help reduce the risk of sexually transmitted infections (STIs) including HIV/AIDS. It is often argued that family planning empowers women to make choices about their bodies and their reproductive health.

== Criticisms of Family Planning Programs ==
While many studies and organizations have pointed out the benefits that family planning programs provide for the women they serve, they are not without their criticisms. There have been several documented cases around the world where women have been coerced into family planning. Researcher Kalpana Wilson noted that financial incentives given to doctors and non-governmental organizations (NGOs) that sterilized women as part of family planning programs amounted to creating a quota system that was rife for abuse and encouraged forced sterilizations for monetary gain, especially in vulnerable and marginalized communities. In India, one doctor who had performed tens of thousands of laparoscopic tubectomies was charged with performing the surgical procedure in unsanitary and hazardous conditions that led to several injuries and several deaths. Instances of forced sterilization is not an isolated case confined to India. In Peru, over 2000 poor women belonging to rural, indigenous communities were coerced and forced to be sterilized between 1995 and 2000. Critics of the Peruvian program suggest the health care workers were incentivized to sterilize the women for cash bonuses of ten dollars per woman. Since the 1980s, charges of forced sterilizations and abortions have been associated with the Chinese government's family planning program as well.
