= Hotel Silence (film) =

2024 film by Léa Pool

- French: Hôtel Silence
- Directed by: Léa Pool
- Written by: Léa Pool
- Based on: Hotel Silence by Auður Ava Ólafsdóttir
- Produced by: Elisa Garbar; Lyse Lafontaine; François Tremblay
- Starring: Sébastien Ricard
- Cinematography: Denis Jutzeler
- Edited by: Michel Arcand
- Music by: Mario Batkovic
- Production companies: Lyla Films; Louise Productions
- Distributed by: Les Films Opale
- Release date: March 29, 2024 (Quebec)
- Running time: 100 minutes
- Countries: Canada; Switzerland
- Language: French
- Budget: C$5.3 million

Hotel Silence (French: Hôtel Silence) is a 2024 Canadian-Swiss drama film written and directed by Léa Pool, based on Auður Ava Ólafsdóttir's novel Hotel Silence. It stars Sébastien Ricard as a Canadian man confronting despair in a war-devastated country. The film was nominated for the Prix de Soleure at the 60th Solothurn Film Festival in 2025.

== Synopsis ==
The film follows Jean, a man in despair who travels from Canada to an unnamed war-devastated country in Europe intending to end his life, but gains a new perspective after encountering the resilience of the people at Hotel Silence.

== Cast ==
The cast includes:

- Sébastien Ricard as Jean
- Lorena Handschin as Ana
- Jules Porier as Zoran
- Irène Jacob as Kristina
- Louise Turcot as the mother
- Paul Ahmarani as the neighbour

== Production ==
The film was written and directed by Léa Pool, based on a novel by Auður Ava Ólafsdóttir. It was produced by Lyla Films in co-production with Louise Productions Lausanne and had an approximate budget of C$5.3 million. Filming took place over 28 days, in France in November 2022, Switzerland in January 2023 and Quebec in February 2023.

== Reception ==
=== Awards and nominations ===
The film was nominated for the Prix de Soleure at the 60th Solothurn Film Festival in 2025.

=== Critical response ===
Swissinfo wrote that the film had a simple story and dialogue, and that some scenes were not entirely convincing, but remained moving to the end. The review praised Mario Batkovic’s score as outstanding. WOZ wrote that Pool avoided several clichés, focusing instead on the relationships among the characters and their responses to one another’s suffering.

== Festival screenings ==
Hôtel Silence was released in Quebec cinemas on 29 March 2024. In 2024, the film was screened at festivals including the 17th Festival du Film Francophone d’Angoulême, the 48th Hof International Film Festival and the 21st Reykjavík International Film Festival. In 2025, it was screened at the 60th Solothurn Film Festival.
