= Hannes Pétursson =

Icelandic poet and writer (born 1931)

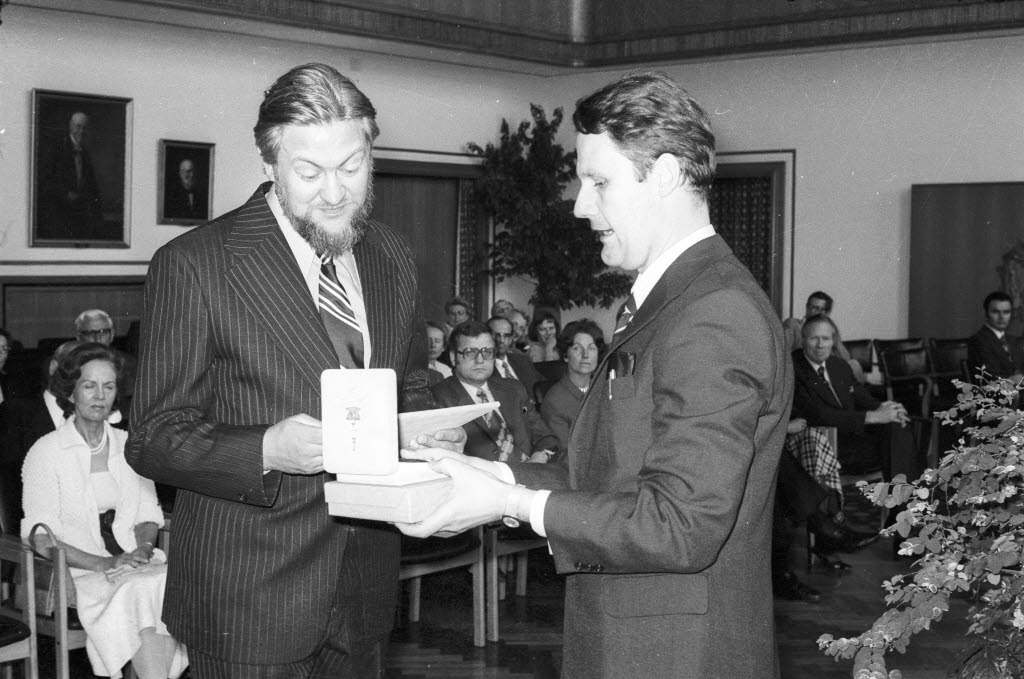
- Hannes Pétursson in 1975
- Born: 14 December 1931 (age 94); Sauðárkrókur, Iceland
- Education: University of Iceland
- Occupations: Poet; writer

Hannes Pétursson (born 14 December 1931) is an Icelandic poet and writer who has authored a number of books of poetry and other works and received many awards. He is amongst the most widely translated of living Icelandic poets. He is a recipient of the German Henrik Steffens Prize in 1975 and the Icelandic Literary Prize for his poetry collection Eldhylur in 1993.

== Biography ==
Hannes was born in Sauðárkrókur and educated in Reykjavík. He was 23 years old when he published his first book of poetry, Kvæðabók, which attracted attention. He completed a course in Icelandic Studies and philology at the University of Iceland in 1959 and worked for Bókaútgáfa Menningarsjóðs (Cultural Publishing) between 1959 and 1976. By 1966 he had already established himself as one of Iceland's leading poets.

Hannes has authored collections of poetry, fiction, narrative elements, short stories and travelogues, a book about the poet Steingrímur Thorsteinsson, a reference work on literature, and many translations. He was awarded the Icelandic Literary Prize for his poetry collection Eldhylur in 1993 and the German Henrik Steffens Prize in 1975. A writer in World Literature Today said of him when he won the Icelandic Literary Prize, "Hannes Petursson has long been one of Iceland's most eminent poets, yet he has never done better than now. His craft is without blemish." He is an honorary Writer of Iceland. His poetry has been translated into 12 languages.

== Style ==
Most of his works of poetry are free-form, with many references to national traditions, legends and cultural heritage, national song and folklore. Encyclopædia Britannica says that "early works of Hannes Pétursson show great sensitivity and skill in adapting Icelandic to new, European metres. Pétursson’s later poems (such as those in the collection Ur hugskoti [1976; “Recollections”]) reveal a movement away from innovative forms to [the] more traditional."

In some of his prose, Hannes has worked with a traditional Icelandic form known as sagnaþættir. Sagnaþættir, which have a characteristic form and style, chronicle historical events in a particular place, based on oral histories or written accounts.

== Selected works ==
- Kvæðabók, 1955.
- Í sumardölum (In summer valleys), 1959.
- Stund og staðir (Time and places), 1962.
- Steingrímur Thorsteinsson, líf hans og list, 1964.
- Steinar og sterkir litir, 1965.
- Innlönd, 1968.
- Rímblöð (Pages of rhyme), 1971.
- Íslenzkt skáldatal 1.-2., 1973-1976.
- Rauðamyrkur, 1973.
- Óður um Ísland, 1974.
- Úr hugskoti, 1976.
- Heimkynni við sjó, 1978.
- Kvæðafylgsni, 1979.
- 36 ljóð, 1983.
- Frá Ketubjörgum til Klaustra, 1990.
- Eintöl á vegferðum, 1991.
- Eldhylur (Fire Pit), 1993.
- Fyrir kvölddyrum, 2006.

=== Prose ===
- Sögur að norðan (Stories from the North), 1961.
- Ljóðabréf (Letters Of Poetry), 1973.
- Misskipt er manna láni 1.-3., 1982-1987.
