= Auður Jónsdóttir =

Icelandic writer (born 1973)

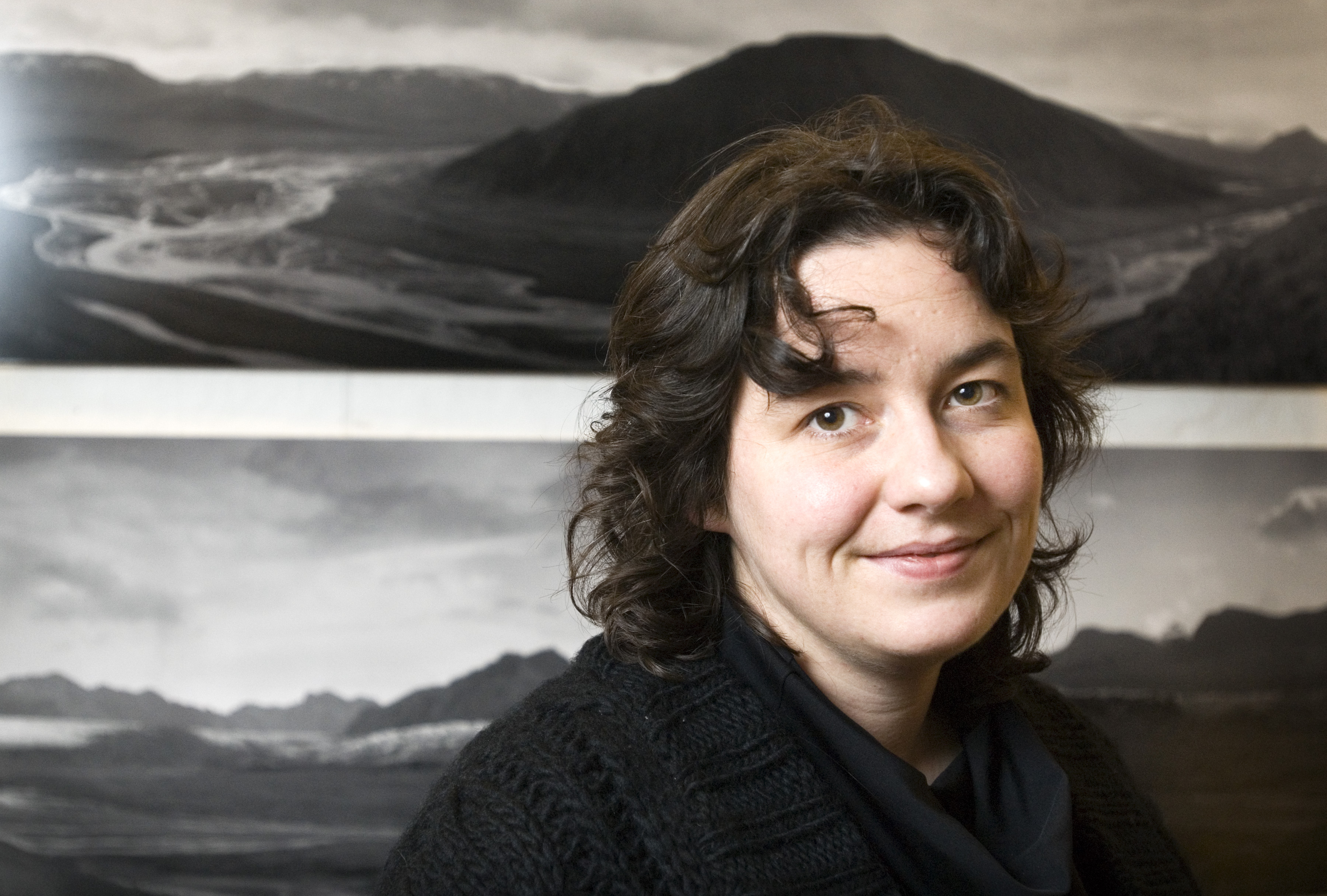
- Audur Jonsdottir 2016
- Born: 30 March 1973 (age 53); Reykjavík
- Occupation: Icelandic writer

Auður Jónsdóttir (born 30 March 1973) is an Icelandic author. Her novels deal with family, particularly mother-daughter relationships.

== Career ==
Auður's debut novel, Bliss (Stjórnlaus Lukka), was nominated for the Icelandic Literary Prize in 1998.

In 2002 she wrote the children's book One self is the strangest of all (Skrýtnastur er maður sjálfur), a portrait of her grandfather, the Nobel prize-winning author Halldor Laxness.

The People in the Basement won the 2004 Icelandic Literary Prize followed by a nomination for Nordic Council's Literature Prize in 2006. It came out and was very well received in Denmark and Sweden in the same year.

Wintersun (Vetrarsól), received positive reviews in Der Spiegel and Hamburger Abendblatt among others.

In 2009, Auður worked at the Reykjavik City Theater as an in-house writer for one year resulting in a play being adapted from The People in the Basement in the following year. The show was a huge success with critics and audience alike.

Secretaries to the Spirits (Ósjálfrátt) was published in 2012 and was the best-selling Icelandic fine literature fiction of the Christmas season. It won the Fjöruverðlaun (Women's literary award) and was nominated for the Icelandic Literary Prize as well as the Nordic Council's Literature Prize. The publishing rights were sold to Random House (Germany), Tiderne Skifter (Denmark) and Presse de la Cité (France).

Auður latest novel, Grand Mal (Stóri skjálfti), became Auður's most successful novel to date.

Other work by Auður includes international news articles, essays and two books for children with reading disabilities, published by The National Centre for Educational Materials.

She has named Chimamanda Ngozi Adichie, Isabelle Allende, Nikolai Gogol, Günter Grass, Gabriel Garcia Marquez, Haruki Murakami, Zadie Smith, and Yoko Tawada as influences.

Auður was given a full-year artist salary by The Ministry of Education and Culture for 2023. The stipend amounts to ISK 507,500 ($3,551; €3,354) per month.

== Works ==
=== Novels ===
- Bliss (1998)
- Another life (2000)
- The People in the Basement (2004)
  - Danish edition (2007)
  - Swedish edition (2007)
- Tryggðarpantur (Deposit) (2006)
  - Danish edition (2007)
- Vetrarsól (Wintersun) (2008)
  - Jenseits des Meeres liegt die ganze Welt (2011, German translation), btb Random House Germany
  - Netherlands edition (2012), Querido
- Ósjálfrátt (Secretaries to the Spirits) (2012)
- Stóri skjálfti (Grand Mal) (2015)
  - Quake (2022, English translation), Dottir Press

=== Short stories ===
- The Wedding (1997)
- The Fat Mother (2001)
- The Little lawyer (2002)
- Casablanca (2003)
- Ofeig's good advice (2004)
- The Stories (2006)

=== Children's books ===
- Total Freedom (2001)
- Skrýtnastur er maður sjálfur (The Strangest Of All Is One Self) (2002)

=== Plays ===
- The People In The Basement (2010)

== Adaptations ==
The People In The Basement, Deposit, and Grand Mal are being adapted for the silver screen. Quake, the adaptation of Grand Mal, was well-received when it premiered in Iceland and the United States in 2022. The film rights were sold to Juno Films and Njuta Films, who planned to release the film theatrically in late 2022. The film was written and directed by Tinna Hrafnsdóttir.

== Personal life ==
Auður experienced seizures as a child, which later influenced her epileptic protagonist in Stóri skjálfti. She also had a dog in her childhood. She lived in England for a time as a child.

She has lived in four countries: Barcelona, Spain, Copenhagen, Denmark, Berlin, Germany and England.

She worked in a fish factory in Flateyri in 1995, which would later inform her novel Ósjálfrátt.

Auður divides her time between Berlin and Reykjavik with her family.

== Awards and nominations ==
- 2016 - The Icelandic Radio (RUV) Award
- 2015 - Icelandic book sellers prize: Grand Mal
- 2015 - Icelandic Literary Prize (Nomination): Grand Mal
- 2014 - Nordic Council Literature Prize (Nomination): Secretaries to the Spirits
- 2012 - DV Newspaper's Cultural Award (Nomination): Secretaries to the Spirits
- 2012 - The Women's Literary Award: Secretaries to the Spirits
- 2011 - Icelandic Theatre Awards, Griman: The People in the Basement (shared with Olafur Egilsson)
- 2006 - Icelandic Literary Prize (Nomination): Deposit
- 2006 - Nordic Council Literature Prize (Nomination): The People in the Basement
- 2004 - Icelandic Literary Prize: The People in the Basement
- 2002 - Icelandic book sellers prize: The strangest of all is you
- 2002 - Upplýsing Prize (Librarians): The strangest of all is you
- 2002 - Icelandic Literary Prize (Nomination): The strangest of all is you
- 1998 - Icelandic Literary Prize (Nomination): Bliss

== See also ==
- List of Icelandic writers
- Icelandic literature
