= Heiða Guðný Ásgeirsdóttir =

Icelandic farmer and politician (born 1978)

Heiða Guðný Ásgeirsdóttir (born 26 April 1978) is an Icelandic sheep farmer and former model who serves as a deputy member of the Althing.

== Career ==
From her late teens until she was 23, Heiða worked as a fashion model, including in New York City; she returned to take over her parents' sheep farm, Ljótarstaðir on the River Tungufljót, after her father could no longer manage it. He has since died; she lives there with her mother and also runs occasional walking tours of the farm, which covers 6,464 hectares (15,970 acres) and has about 500 sheep. As of 2014 she was possibly the only Icelandic woman shearing sheep; in February 2017 she was the only female contestant in the machine shearing division at the World Shearing and Woolhandling Championships in New Zealand.

She has also worked in construction and as a local police officer, and is on the board of the nearby Vatnajökull National Park. In 2017 she modelled again, for a new Icelandic brand.

Heiða became involved in environmental politics fighting plans to construct a hydro-electric plant which would involve damming the river and flooding much of her farm. She was elected as an alternate member of the Althing in the 2017 elections, representing the South constituency for the Left-Green Movement, and made her maiden speech on 18 September 2018.

== Biography ==
In 2016 she was the subject of novelist and poet Steinunn Sigurðardóttir's first non-fiction book, Heiða – Fjalldalabóndi (Heiða – The Farmer in the Valley, her local nickname).
