= Vetrarsól =

Vetrarsól (Winter Sun) is the fourth novel by Auður Jónsdóttir, published in 2008 by Mál og menning. Reviews include those in Der Spiegel, Hamburger Abendblatt, and Morgunblaðið.

== Style and themes ==
With a female protagonist, Sunna, who presents herself as often rather bewildered by the world around her, written in the first person and in an often confessional tone, and drawing on stream-of-consciousness styles, Vetrarsól satirises chick-lit. As in other work by Auður, the novel meditates extensively on motherhood and mother-daughter relations. The plot is structured around Sunna's peripheral involvement in a police hunt for a missing woman, her ex-flatmate and friend Arndís; Sunna's peripheral position enables the novel also to satirise the melodramatic character of crime fiction.

== Summary ==
The novel is set in Reykjavik. Sunna recounts events in her life running from December 1 to 9 in an unspecified year. These events are intertwined with her recollections of her time as a student in the Raval district of Barcelona about ten years before.

In the novel's present, Sunna's partner Axel leaves for a business meeting in Ísafjörður, but his ex-wife has asked him at short notice to look after his son by his first marriage, Helgi. Axel is then trapped in Ísafjörður by bad weather for the rest of the novel—though it transpires at the end that the main reason for his delay is his desperate and failed attempts to rescue his ailing business. Sunna, despite having spent little time with Helgi previously, has to care for him throughout the novel, and their developing relationship is an important thread. Much of the novel is framed by Sunna's attempts to juggle her work as an under-appreciated employee at a publishing house with looking after Helgi, often with the help of her mother, a characterful working-class left-winger.

At the beginning of the novel, Sunna sees in the news that Arndís Théodórsdóttir has gone missing. She and Arndís had been flatmates while students in Barcelona, and much of the novel comprises Sunna's reminiscences about this time. It emerges implicitly through Sunna's account that Arndís is an outgoing but also domineering character, with a tendency to islamophobia structured through her White feminism (which implicitly overlooks the insights of postcolonial feminism). While in Barcelona, Arndís gets to know an illegal immigrant from Morocco, Fatíma. Sunna acquires a Spanish boyfriend, Jordi, and gets pregnant by him, and is guided by Arndís to get an abortion.

With the encouragement of Helgi and her mother, framed by their participation in a class on writing crime novels which Sunna is involved in running as part of her work, Sunna makes some effort to investigate Arndís's disappearance. Arndís's previous husband, Benni, was murdered while working as a doctor in Africa; Sunna discovers that he was involved in a company called Futura Nostra that harvested human egg-cells from people in poor countries in return for providing medical care. Sunna meets Arndís's new partner, Garðar, but fails to be much help. This contact does lead her later to encounter Arndís's young daughter by her first marriage, Hera. After this point, she is followed by three young men who at one point corner her and threateningly ask where Arndís is. Sunna thinks she may recognise one; the police later warn Arndís that these men may be terrorists.

Eventually, Sunna divines that Arndís must be hiding in an art gallery she has set up at Stokkseyri, and finds her there. Revealing that she has guessed that Hera is actually Fatíma's daughter and not Arndís's, Sunna forces Arndís to explain what is going on. It emerges that Fatíma had been raped and got pregnant. She was afraid to admit this to her family, fearing ostracisation. Arndís convinced her to disguise the pregnancy, to give birth via a secret caesarian section operation performed by Benni, and to give Arndís and Benni the baby, which they would pretend was their own. By Arndís's account, Fatíma died of infection as a result of the operation and was secretly interred by Benni. When Benni was murdered, Arndís also pointed the police to Fatíma's brothers. The three men who threatened Sunna were indeed Arndís's brothers: when she heard they had come to Iceland, Arndís fled.

The novel ends without neat resolutions. Arndís collects Hera from school and flees the country; Sunna realises she is pregnant, and looks forward to motherhood; she is glad to have established a relationship with Helgi; she puts her relationship with Arndís behind her; and she must steer the family through Axel's latest business failure.

== Translations ==
Audur Jónsdóttir, Jenseits des Meeres liegt die ganze Welt, trans. by Kristof Magnusson (München: btb, 2011), ISBN 9783442752539
