= Miss Iceland (novel) =

2018 novel

- First edition
- Author: Auður Ava Ólafsdóttir
- Original title: Ungfrú Ísland
- Translator: Brian FitzGibbon
- Language: English
- Genre: Novel
- Set in: Iceland
- Publisher: Grove Press
- Publication date: 2018
- English publication date: 2020
- Pages: 256
- ISBN: 978-0802149237

Miss Iceland (Icelandic: Ungfrú Ísland) is a 2018 novel by award-winning novelist Auður Ava Ólafsdóttir.

Set in the conservative Icelandic society of the 1960s, this novel showcases Hekla, a woman eager to become a writer and free herself from social prejudice.
