= Ingibjörg Haraldsdóttir =

Icelandic poet and translator (1942–2016)

- Born: October 21, 1942; Reykjavík, Iceland
- Died: November 7, 2016 (aged 74)
- Occupations: Poet, translator
- Writing career
- Notable work: Kona ("Woman")
- Notable awards: Icelandic Literary Prize (2002)

Ingibjörg Haraldsdóttir (21 October 1942 – 7 November 2016) was an Icelandic poet and translator. She lived in Cuba from 1970 to 1975 and also lived in the U.S.S.R. for a time. She has had six books of poetry published. In translations she is most known for her work translating Russian and Spanish works. She was born in Reykjavík. In 2002, she was awarded the Icelandic Literary Prize.

Her best known poem is Kona ('woman'), from 1983:

Þegar allt hefur verið sagt
þegar vandamál heimsins eru
vegin metin og útkljáð
þegar augu hafa mæst
og hendur verið þrýstar
í alvöru augnabliksins
─kemur alltaf einhver kona
að taka af borðinu
sópa gólfið og opna gluggana
til að hleypa vindlareyknum út.

Það bregst ekki.

Translation:

When all has been said
When the problems of the world
Have been weighed gauged and settled
When eyes have met
And hands been pressed
In the sobriety of the moment
–some woman always comes
To clear the table
Sweep the floor and open the windows
To let out the cigar smoke.

It never fails.

== Education ==
After graduating from high school, Ingibjörg studied at the State Film School in Moscow and completed a Master of Arts degree in film directing from there in 1969. She worked as an assistant director at the Teatro Estudio in Havana, Cuba, from 1970 to 1975. She wrote and translated newspaper articles, mainly for Þjóðvoljann, during her stay in the Soviet Union and Cuba.After graduating from high school, Ingibjörg studied at the State Film School in Moscow and completed a Master of Arts degree in film directing from there in 1969.

== Career ==
She worked as an assistant director at the Teatro Estudio in Havana, Cuba, from 1970 to 1975. She wrote and translated newspaper articles, mainly for Þjóðvoljann, during her stay in the Soviet Union and Cuba.

Ingibjörg won the Icelandic Literature Prize in 2002 for her poetry collection Hvar sem ég verð, which was also nominated for the Nordic Council Literature Prize.

Ingibjörg returned to Iceland at the end of 1975 and worked for several years as a journalist and film critic at Þjóðviljinn. From 1981 onward, she focused primarily on her career as a poet and translator. Her first collection of poetry, Þangað vil ég fljúga, had been published in 1974. Over the course of her career, she published six collections of poetry, including one anthology, and her works have been translated into Hungarian, German, Latvian, Lithuanian, Bulgarian, Russian, Slovak, English, and the Nordic languages.

She received a number of literary awards, among them the Guðmundur Böðvarsson Poetry Prize, the Icelandic Literature Prize, the DV Cultural Prize for her translation of Dostoyevsky’s The Idiot, and the Icelandic Translation Prize in 2004 for her translation of Dostoyevsky’s The Gambler. She was also nominated twice for the Nordic Council Literature Prize, in 1993 and 2004.
