= Hotel Silence =

2016 novel by Auður Ava Ólafsdóttir

- First edition
- Author: Auður Ava Ólafsdóttir
- Original title: Ör
- Translator: Brian FitzGibbon
- Language: Icelandic
- Genre: Literary fiction
- Set in: Iceland; Unnamed country
- Publisher: Benedikt; Grove Press (English)
- Publication date: 2016
- Publication place: Iceland
- English publication date: 2018
- Media type: Print
- Pages: 288
- Awards: Nordic Council's Literature Prize 2018
- ISBN: 978-0802127501

Hotel Silence (Icelandic: Ör) is a 2016 novel by Auður Ava Ólafsdóttir.

== Premise ==
The novel deals with a man, Jónas Ebeneser, who's in his late 40s, poor, abandoned by his wife, and suffering his midlife crisis. After he realises that his daughter isn't his biological daughter, and his marriage implodes, he decides that there's very little for which him to live. In preparation for his imminent death, he empties his property of his personal effects; he later decides that it would be better to spare his daughter of finding his body, electing to abscond. He moves from Iceland to a war-torn country and plans to commit suicide, say by stepping on a landmine. He checks into Hotel Silence, newly-reopened in the wake of the devastating conflict.

However, in his preparation for backup plans to kill himself, he takes with him a toolbox. He finds the hotel, surrounded by rubble and deterioration, to be in awful disrepair; May and Fifi, two young adults operating it on behalf of their aunt, find out that he has much-needed repair skills and they begin to renovate the building.

News of his abilities spread through word, and he is suddenly asked by the citizens of the town to repair various property, both houses and businesses. He also establishes relationships with others, especially May, and due to the loss of so many men, he's often treated by townsfolk as the only handyman available. The demand for his help and the budding amities renew his sense of purpose, and while the town is reconstructed, he is simultaneously rehabilitated from his suicidal ideation and tendencies. He establishes a home for himself by integrating himself into the city's society.

== Critical reception ==
The Library Review gave it a starred review, calling it "beautifully spare and insightful tale of redemption." Kirkus Reviews' consensus reads that it's "engaging, perfect for fans of second chances and evolving perspectives." Library Journal, in a starred review, concluded that the novel is "soulful, lighthearted, and tender," proposing that "this charming and immersive work... is a great choice for book discussion groups."

Many reviewers discussed the quality of writing by Ólafsdóttir. The Kirkus review said that it's written in "surreal, almost Kafkaesque [style]... a surprising tale told in almost allegorical form" and Laurie Hertzel of the Star Tribune echoed that the "prose, eloquently translated from the Icelandic by Brian FitzGibbon, is just flat enough to give this quiet novel the feel of a fable." In Publishers Weekly, the reviewer described it as "sparse prose" in "capturing the aimlessness of survivors and the long shadow of war." "Her authorial voice is immediate and intimate, yet it feels remote from the Anglophone world." The Washington Independent Review of Books, though, noted that "brief snippets of random prose occasionally trip up the narrative... trite phrases litter the story. Perhaps these sound poetic in the original Icelandic."

Some believe that its "brilliance is in how utterly relatable it is, how softly human." There is a lot of discussion about the accessibility of the novel, balanced with touches of creativity. Malcolm Forbes of The National admits that "at first glance, [this may] be labelled over-familiar and unoriginal." Though, as Publishers says, "the story moves at a consistently engaging pace" and the "sly humor and bleak realities make for a life-affirming tale without any treacle," and, Forbes continuing, "the more we immerse ourselves in it, the more we encounter fresh slants and innovative touches; Jónas’s story is no straightforward arc. It is a bumpy ride with many twists and turns – culminating in a jolt on the last page... Wry and kooky, serious and sad, Hotel Silence enthralls and entertains." Hertzel concludes, "the book rises above the obvious metaphor (handyman can fix everything but himself) and the clearly signaled ending, moving naturally and powerfully from despair to hope."

== Awards ==
- Icelandic Literary Prize: Won in 2016
- Nordic Council's Literature Prize: Won in 2018
- Prix de Page: Won

== Adaptation ==
The novel was adapted by Léa Pool into the 2024 film Hotel Silence.
