= Gudmundur (Jóhann) Óskarsson =

Icelandic author and screenwriter

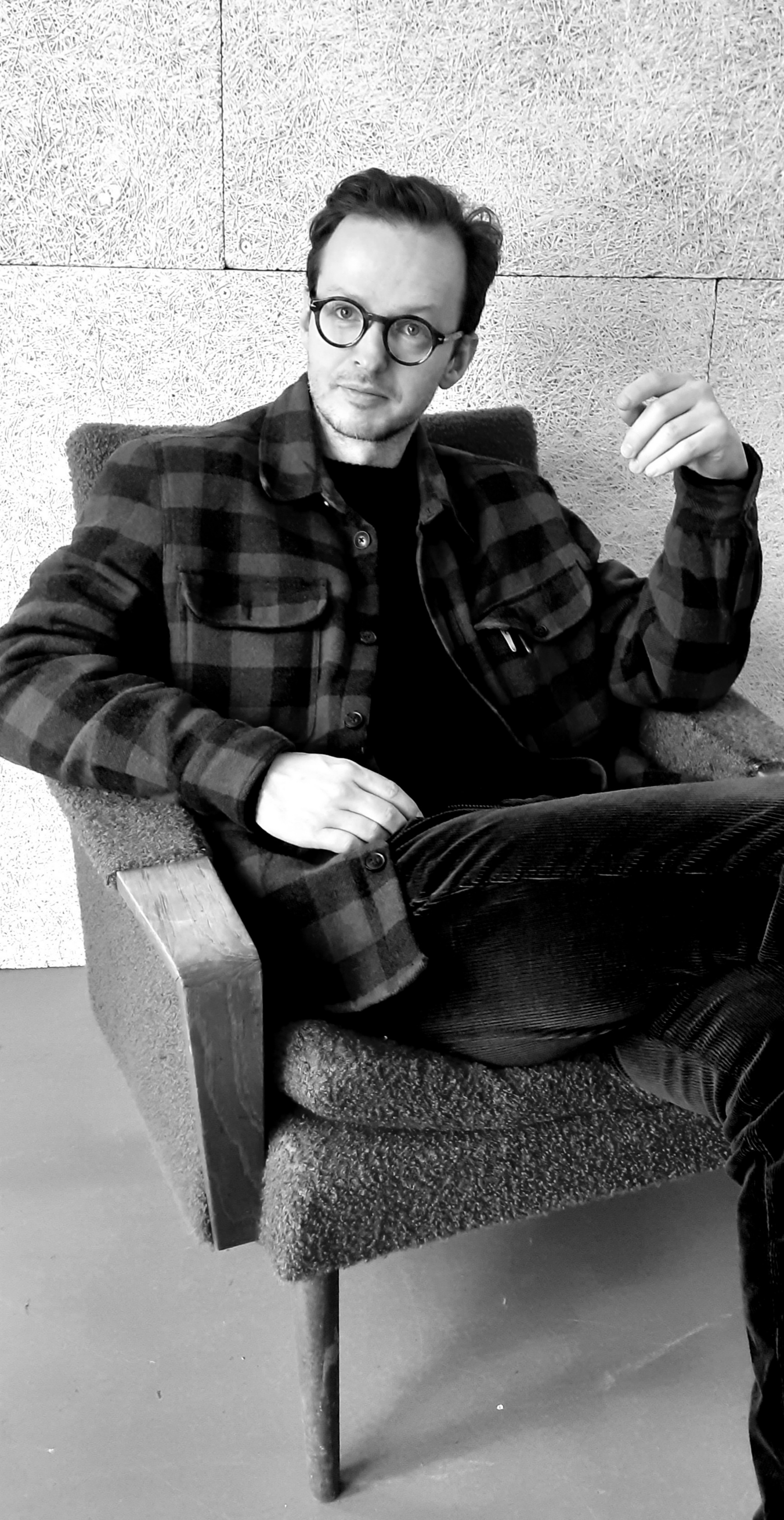
Gudmundur J. Óskarsson, Icelandic author and screenwriter in 2021.

Gudmundur J. Óskarsson (born 1978) is an Icelandic author, screenwriter and producer.

Óskarsson is a receiver of the Icelandic Literary Prize (2009) for his novel Bankster, a psychological realist account on an existential aftermath of the financial crash in Iceland that occurred in 2008.

Other published works include his debut collection of short stories Vaxandi nánd (Increasing Intimacy, 2007) and Villisumar (Cerulean Summer, 2016).

Together with film director Marteinn Thorsson, Óskarsson directs a development and film production company, Tenderlee, based in Reykjavík, Iceland. The company has created and produced feature films XL (2013), starring Ólafur Darri Ólafsson, and Backyard Village (2021), awarded as Best Feature Film and Best Original Screen Play at Vienna International Film Festival Awards. The film stars Tim Plester and Icelandic actress Laufey Elíasdóttir in lead roles.

== Bibliography ==
- Vaxandi nánd (Increasing Intimacy), 2007 ISBN 978-9979-9506-9-1
- Hola í lífi fyrrverandi golfara, 2008 ISBN 978-9979-63-088-3
- Bankster, 2009 ISBN 978-9979-63-094-4
- Villisumar (Cerulean Summer), 2016 ISBN 9789935116352

== Filmography ==
- XL (2013). Screenwriter, Producer.
- Backyard Village (2021). Screenwriter, Producer.
