= Rory McTurk =

British philologist (born 1942)

Rory W. McTurk (born 30 July 1942) is a British philologist. McTurk graduated from Oxford University in 1963. He took a further degree at the University of Iceland in 1965, and subsequently taught at Lund University, the University of Copenhagen, and University College Dublin. He took up a post at the University of Leeds in 1978, where he has gained the position of Professor Emeritus of Icelandic Studies. McTurk has authored, edited and translated many works on Icelandic literature, including the works of Steinnun Sigurðardóttir. He is a recipient of the Order of the Falcon.

== Selected bibliography ==
- Studies in Ragnars Saga Loðbrókar and its Major Scandinavian Analogues, 1991
- Chaucer and the Norse and Celtic Worlds, 2005
