= Dreamland: A Self-Help Manual for a Frightened Nation =

2006 book by Andri Snær Magnason

Draumalandið - Sjálfshjálparbók handa hræddri þjóð
- Author: Andri Snær Magnason
- Original title: Draumalandið
- Language: Icelandic
- Publisher: Mál og menning, Reykjavík
- Publication date: 2006
- Publication place: Iceland
- ISBN: 9979-3-2738-3
- OCLC: 185021869
- LC Class: DL326 .A53 2006

Dreamland - A Self-Help Manual for a Frightened Nation
- Author: Andri Snær Magnason
- Translator: Nicholas Jones
- Language: English
- Publisher: Citizen Press Ltd. London
- Publication date: 2008
- Publication place: England
- ISBN: 978-0-9551363-2-0

Dreamland: A Self-Help Manual for a Frightened Nation (in the original Icelandic: Draumalandið — Sjálfshjálparbók handa hræddri þjóð) is a book by the Icelandic author Andri Snær Magnason.

It became the number one best-selling book in Iceland in 2006, and was winner of the Icelandic Literary Award, and the Icelandic Bookseller Prize the same year. The English edition of the book has a foreword by the Icelandic artist Björk.

== Content ==
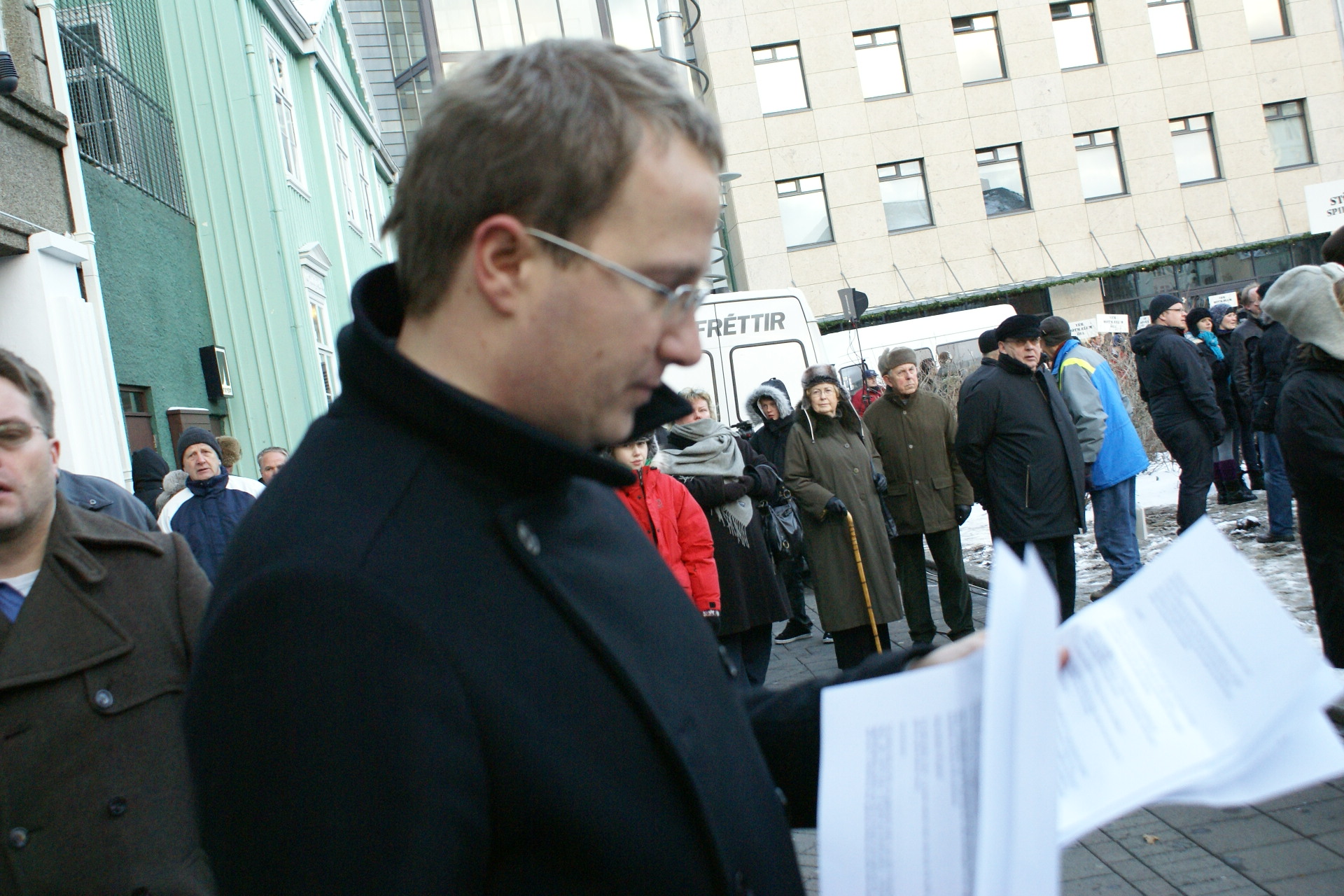
Andri Snær speaking at a protest meeting

Dreamland is Andri Snaer Magnason's critique against the current decision taken by the Icelandic government to dam Iceland's rivers in order to produce energy that can be delivered to aluminium smelters. Magnason describes how Iceland's government actively have pursued the idea to attract foreign aluminium companies to Iceland with the promise of the "cheapest energy in the world". The government advertisement described Iceland's energy potential as 30 TWh/year (3.4 GW annual mean). Magnason argues in the book that in order to accomplish this, the majority of Iceland's rivers would need to be exploited.

It is set up as a series of thoughts on issues in modern Iceland and the past Iceland and deals heavily with the Kárahnjúkar Hydropower Plant and other similar works being done. It was the best sold book in Iceland in 2006 and raised Icelanders' interest in environmentalism by a large amount. In the book the Icelandic nation is encouraged to look to more "futuristic" types of business than aluminium processing and to stop believing that they can't do anything for themselves.

== Bibliographical details and translations ==
- Andri Snær Magnason, Draumalandið: Sjálfshjálparbók handa hræddri þjóð (Reykjavík: Mál og menning, 2006) [original]
- Dreamland: A Self-Help Manual for a Frightened Nation, trans. by Nicholas Jones (London: Citizen Press, 2008), ISBN 9780955136320 [English translation]
- Draumalandið: sjálfshjálparbók handa hræddri þjóð], trans. by Kaoru Moriuchi (Tokyo: s.n., 2009), ISBN 9784140813966 [Japanese translation]
- Drømmeland: selvhjælpsbog til en ængstelig nation, med forord af Björk, trans. by Kim Lembek (København: Tiderne skifter, 2009) ISBN 9788779733602
- Traumland: was bleibt, wenn alles verkauft ist?, trans. from the English by Stefanie Fahrner (Freiburg: Orange Press, 2011), ISBN 9783936086539 [German translation]
- El país de los sueños: manual de autoayuda para una nación atemorizada, trans. by Editorial Aire (s.l.: Aire, 2013), ISBN 9788493995737 [Spanish translation]

== See also ==
- Dreamland (2009 film), based on the book
- Kárahnjúkar Hydropower Plant
