= Dreamland (2009 film) =

2009 Icelandic documentary film directed by Andri Snær Magnason

- Theatrical release poster
- Directed by: Þorfinnur Guðnason; Andri Snær Magnason
- Produced by: Sigurður Gísli Pálmason
- Cinematography: Þorfinnur Guðnason; Guðmundur Bjartmarsson; Hjalti Stefánsson; Bergsteinn Björgúlfsson
- Edited by: Eva Lind Höskuldsdóttir
- Music by: Valgeir Sigurðsson
- Release date: April 8, 2009
- Running time: 90 minutes
- Country: Iceland
- Language: Icelandic

Dreamland (Icelandic: Draumalandið) is a 2009 Icelandic documentary film about politics, environmental preservation and damming, focusing on the Kárahnjúkar Hydropower Plant and its environmental impact. The movie is based on the book Dreamland: A Self-Help Manual for a Frightened Nation by Andri Snær Magnason. The film's soundtrack is composed by Valgeir Sigurðsson.

== Content ==
The documentary Dreamland addresses the question of whether Iceland should preserve its unspoiled, unique nature or whether the nation should build enormous dams to produce hydro-electric energy. The film shows how implementing "green energy" to provide aluminum industries with cheap energy threatens the natural wonders of Iceland.

Through interviews with economists, psychologists, historians, poets, editors, and industry managers, the film delivers insight into different point of views. The documentary illustrates the fact that fear is a powerful emotion and a way of controlling people. For example, the fear of unemployment often leads to a limited view of other possible alternatives. To develop the countryside of Iceland and to employ its citizens, the Icelandic government made Iceland the biggest aluminum manufacturer.

The second theme of the documentary is how the economy benefits from war. The American military base in Keflavík increased the economy of Iceland, but when the United States no longer needed the base, Icelanders feared for their jobs, and the Icelandic government desperately lobbied the American military to stay.

The documentary streams pictures of a beautiful, untouched nature, including volcanoes, glaciers, mountains, and waterfalls, followed by gigantic hydro towers and dams that destroy the wilderness and beautiful landscape. It makes use of clips from the 2005 documentary Wira Pdika, about Bauxite mining in the Niyamgiri hills of Odisha, to emphasise the relationship of aluminium smelting in Iceland to exploitation elsewhere.

== See also ==
- Kárahnjúkar Hydropower Plant
- Dreamland: A Self-Help Manual for a Frightened Nation
