= Tímakistan =

Novel by Andri Snær Magnason

First edition (publ. Mál og menning)

Tímakistan ('the time-chest' or, in the author's own rendering, 'the casket of time') is a children's/young adults' novel by Andri Snær Magnason. It has won several prizes.

== Form ==
The novel is in prose, with a few verses quoted (one as the epigraph and others by characters). It has two narrative threads: a frame story implicitly set in Iceland and more or less in the present; and the main narrative, told within this frame, set in a distant and fantastical past. The narratives converge as it emerges that events recounted in the inner story explain the causes of events in the frame story. The story contains elements of satire of modern society.

== Plot summary ==
In the frame story, the main character is a girl called Sigrún. The world is in the grip of an economic crisis, and Sigrún's parents are convinced by adverts to buy three flat-pack boxes which turn out to be boxes in which, when the box is closed, time stands still. Each family member enters their own box, in the expectation that all will automatically be released at the same time, once the recession is over.

However, Sigrún's box opens early, and she finds her home overgrown and inhabited by animals; lacking the requisite type of allen key, she is unable to open her parents' boxes. It later emerges that the more adults attempted to escape the recession by entering time-boxes, the deeper the recession grew, until everyone had shut themselves in a time-box, leaving all the physical remains of human civilisation to decay. Sigrún and other children in a similar situation converge on the home of the only adult who is not in a time-box, a mysterious old woman called Svala.

Svala recounts to the children the story of Hrafntinna, the Princess of Pangea (who later turns out to be Svala herself). The story explains that a male ancestor of Hrafntinna's was taught by three mysterious sisters to command animals by means of spells. The sisters prohibited him from using these powers to harm people. People are so impressed by this man that he becomes king, and his powers enable him to establish agriculture, urbanisation, and the first state: Pangea. One of his descendants is King Dímon. Dímon's first love dies in childbirth, after begetting Hrafntinna. Dímon, overcome by sorrow and rage, is convinced by a mysterious accountant called Exel to use his power over animals to conquer the world in the name of his new daughter.

Hrafntinna grows up seeing little of her warring father; she is prevented by her status and court custom from making friends, and is unaware of her father's megalomania and tyranny. The situation is exacerbated when Dímon completes his conquest of Pangea, only to realise that he cannot conquer time. He offers half his kingdom to anyone who enables him to conquer time and preserve Hrafntinna's beauty. The challenge is met by a group of dwarves, among the last survivors of a genocidal war by Dímon's father. They present Dímon with a chest made from spiders' silk through which time cannot penetrate. Hrafntinna is put inside and is only allowed out occasionally, staying the same age as others age around her.

Animation of the historical rifting of Pangaea

Decapitating the dwarves, Dímon accidentally cuts Pangea in two, losing half his kingdom. He sets off to reconquer it. In the King's absence, his second wife Gunnhildur and a self-appointed monk, Ígull Kórall, use the unwitting Hrafntinna to establish a cult of the 'immortal princess', using her to control their people. Hrafntinna is visited by a would-be thief, the child Kári, who opens the time-chest, becomes Hrafntinna's first and only friend, and secretly visits her once a month; the two fall in love.

Eventually, Gunnhildur and Ígull plot to murder Hrafntinna. Kári and Dímon independently try to save her, Kári shooting Gunnhildur and Dímon Ígull. However, Dímon's arrow passes through Ígull and enters Hrafntinna's heart. The time-chest preserves Hrafntinna's life just at the point of death. Dímon is killed by a popular revolt; Kári spends his life making another time-chest for himself in the hope of joining Hrafntinna in the future; and the city is abandoned.

Hrafntinna is rediscovered in the modern era by an archaeologist/treasure-hunter, Jakob Cromwell, and saved from death by modern medicine. Jakob discovers the secret of the time-chest, founds the company Tímax, and mass-produces his own time-boxes, leading adults to shun responsibility for their children and their society by simply waiting for bad times to pass, with terrible consequences.

Having learned the cause of their predicament from Hrafntinna/Svala, Sigrún and her friends find Cromwell and release the spiders which made the time-boxes; the spiders eat the boxes and human society is revived. The story ends with Svala/Hrafntinna finding Kári's time-chest and at last meeting her lost love.

== Criticism ==
The novel draws inspiration from folk- and fairy-tales (prominently Snow White) and medieval Icelandic legendary sagas. In the assessment of Dagný Kristjánsdóttir, the novel is characterised by environmentalism, in its message that human interventions in the natural order have bad results; perversions of power, particularly in late capitalism; the manipulation of popular opinion through religion, propaganda, and marketing; and the problematisation of ideas of childhood innocence.

== Awards ==
- Icelandic Literary Prize 2013 – (Children’s/ Young Adult).
- Icelandic Booksellers' Award – Best Young Adult book of 2013.
- Nominated for the West Nordic Council's Children and Youth Literature Prize 2014.

== Translations ==
- The Casket of Time, trans. by Björg Arnadóttir and Andrew Cauthery (New York: Restless Books, 2018), ISBN 9781632062055 (English translation)
- Tidskisten, trans. by Kim Lembek (København: Tiderne skifter, 2016), ISBN 9788779737228 (Danish translation)
- Aika-arkku, trans. by Tapio Koivukari (Helsinki: Aula & Co, 2017) ISBN 9789527190500 (Finnish translation)
- A ilusao do tempo, trans. by Suzannah Branco (Sao Paulo: Editora Morro Branco [no year]) ISBN 9788592795061 (Portuguese translation)
- 『タイムボックス』(taimu bokkusu or time box), trans. by 野沢佳織 (Kaori Nozawa) (Tokyo: NHK 出版 NHK Publishing, Inc., 2016), ISBN 9784140056813 (Japanese translation)
- 《光阴之盒》, trans. by 王书慧 (Nanning: 接力出版社 Jieli Publishing House Co. Ltd., 2018), ISBN 9787544857123 (Simplified Chinese translation)
- Laiko skrynia, trans. Vaida Jankūnaitė (Kaunas: Debesų ganyklos, 2021), ISBN 9786094731952 (Lithuanian translation)
- Laika lāde, trans. Dens Dimiņš (Riga: liels un mazs, 2025), ISBN 9789934633263 (Latvian translation)
