= The Hero's Journey to the Third Pole =

2020 Icelandic documentary film

- poster
- Icelandic: Þriðji póllinn
- Directed by: Andri Snær Magnason; Anní Ólafsdóttir
- Screenplay by: Andri Snær Magnason; Anní Ólafsdóttir
- Produced by: Andri Snær Magnason; Sigurður Gísli Pálmason; Halldóra Jóhanna Þorláksdóttir; Hlín Jóhannesdóttir
- Starring: Högni Egilsson; Anna Tara Edwards
- Edited by: Eva Lind Höskuldsdóttir; Anní Ólafsdóttir; Davíð Alexander Corno
- Music by: Högni Egilsson
- Production company: Elsku Rut
- Release dates: 24 September 2020 (Reykjavík); 21 April 2021 (Copenhagen)
- Running time: 75 minutes
- Language: Icelandic

The Hero's Journey to the Third Pole (Icelandic: Þriðji póllinn) is an Icelandic documentary film from 2020, directed by Andri Snær Magnason and Anní Ólafsdóttir. It documents the efforts of Anna Tara Edwards and musician Högni Egilsson to put on a concert to raise awareness of bipolar disorder, and mental illness more generally, in Nepal.

The Hero's Journey to the Third Pole premiered at Háskólabíó in Reykjavík on 24 September 2020; its international premiere was at CPH:DOX in Copenhagen on 21 April 2021.

The film was nominated in five categories at the 2021 Edda Awards, and Högni won the award for Best Music (Tónlist ársins).
