= Andri Snær Magnason =

Icelandic writer (born 1973)

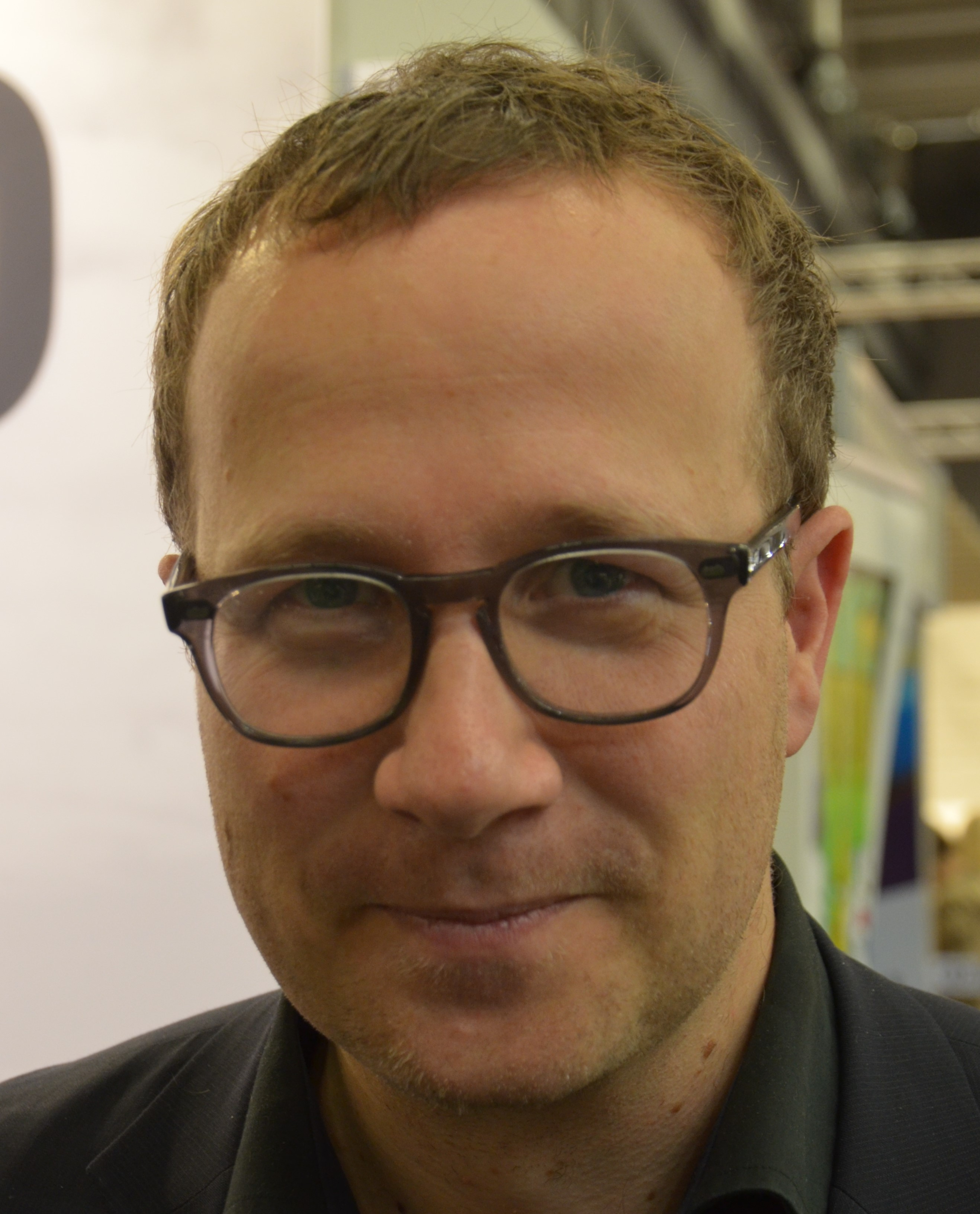
- Magnason in 2014
- Born: 14 July 1973 (age 53); Reykjavík, Iceland
- Education: BA in literature
- Writing career
- Language: Icelandic
- Genres: Children's books, environmentalism
- Notable awards: West Nordic Council's Children and Youth Literature Prize; 2002; Icelandic Literary Award; 1999, 2006, 2014; KAIROS Prize; 2007; West Nordic Council's Children and Youth Literature Prize; 2014; UKLA Award; 2014

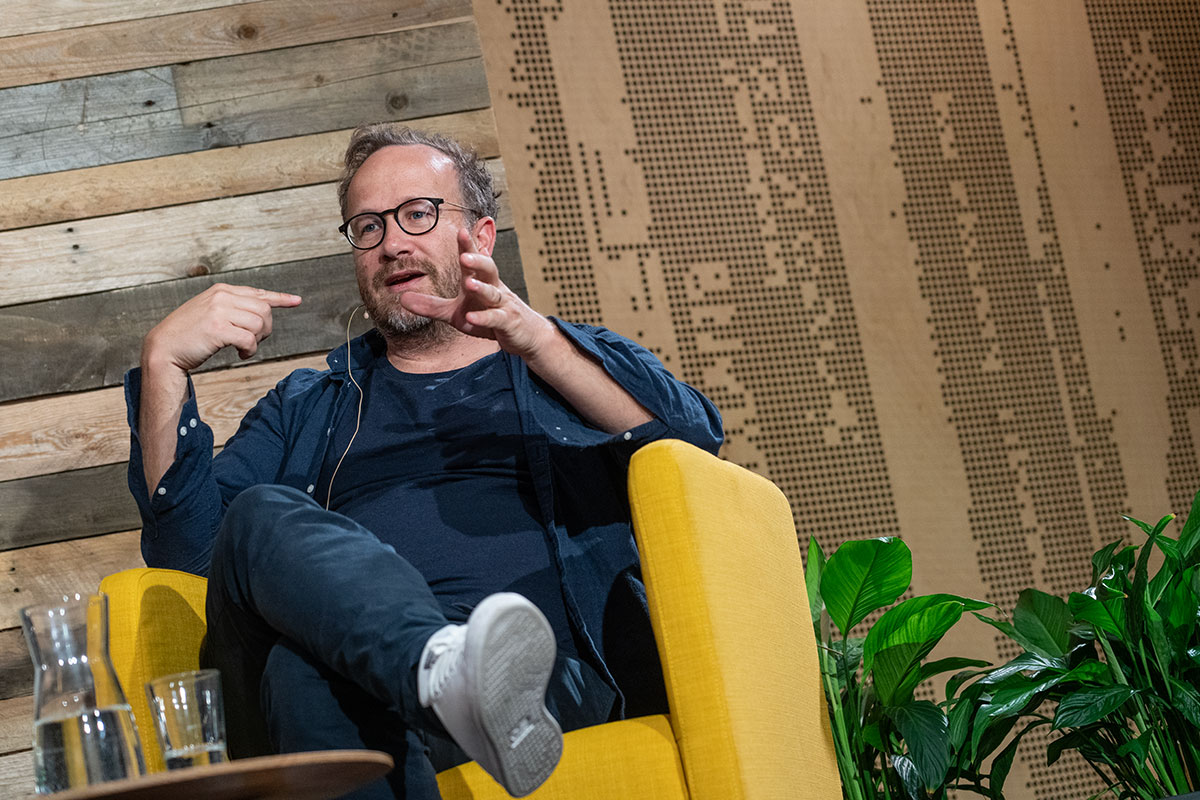
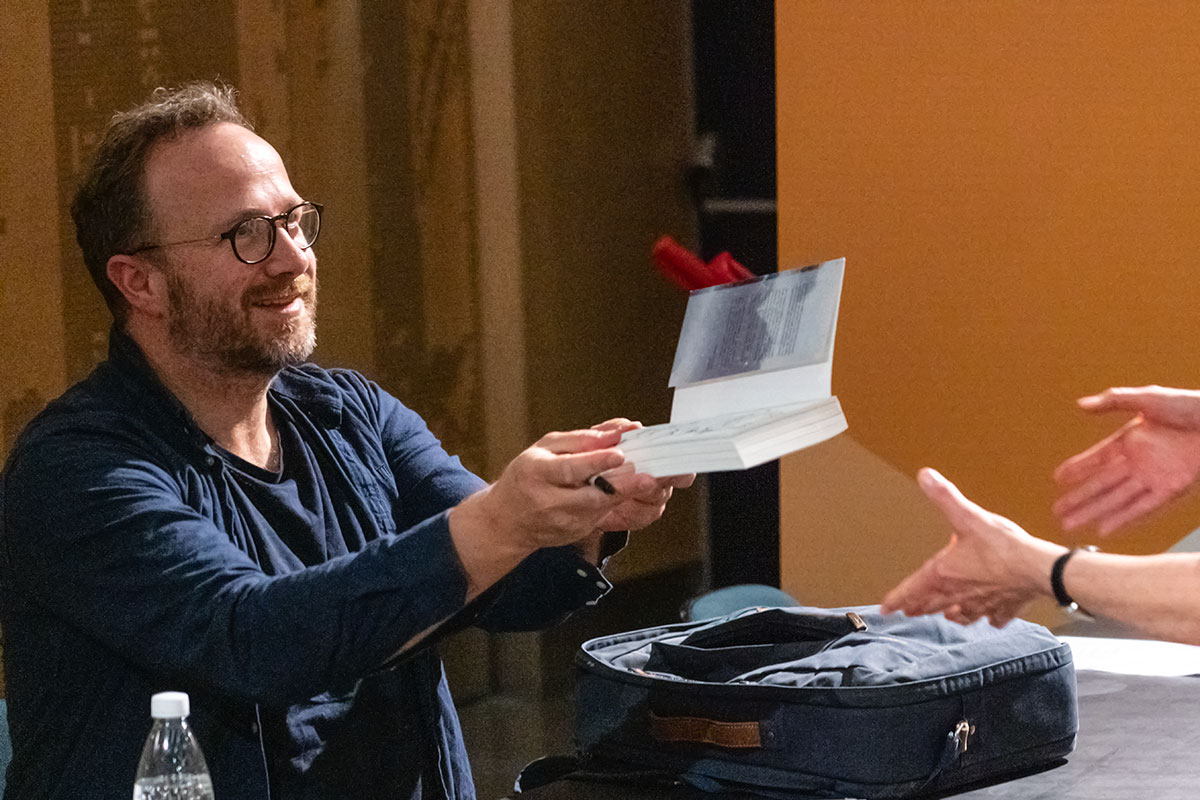
LiteratureXcange Festival Aarhus
(Denmark 2023)
Photos Hreinn Gudlaugsson

Andri Snær Magnason (born 14 July 1973) is an Icelandic writer. He has written novels, poetry, plays, short stories, and essays. Andri is also a director and producer of three documentary films that have premiered in IDFA and CPH:DOX. His work has been published or performed in more than 40 countries.

He has received the Icelandic Literary Prize in all categories, fiction, non-fiction and for children's literature. The first time in 1999 for the children's book The Story of the Blue Planet, and again in 2006 for the non-fiction book Dreamland, a critique of Icelandic industrial and energy policy. He also won the prize for his 2013 book, Tímakistan.

Andri wrote an obituary for the first glacier Iceland lost to climate change, Ok-glacier in 2019 with these words:

“Ok is the first Icelandic glacier to lose its status as a glacier. In the next 200 years all our glaciers are expected to follow the same path. This monument is to acknowledge that we know what is happening and what needs to be done, only you know if we did it."

His book, On Time and Water from 2019 is a work of narrative non fiction, translated to more than 30 languages. The book explores climate change through language, memory and mythology. He did a TED talk on the issue.

He was a candidate in the 2016 Icelandic presidential election.

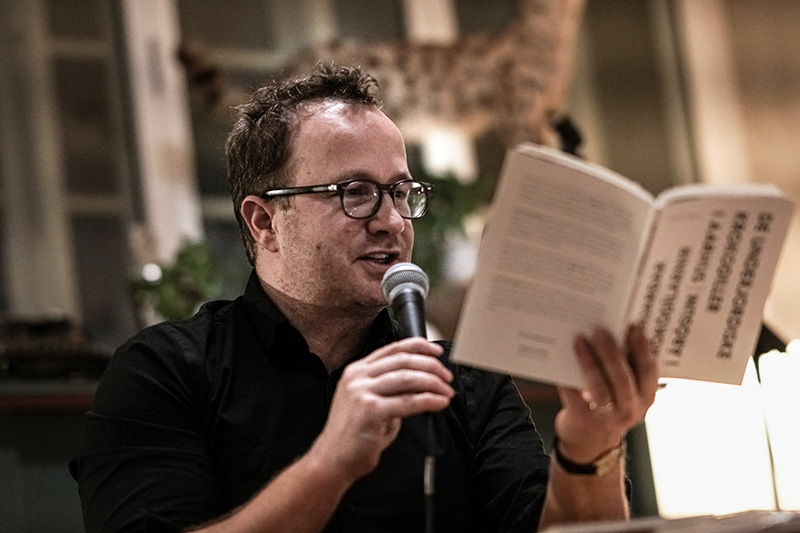
Andri Snær Magnason in Aarhus, Denmark 2017

== About ==
Andri was born in Reykjavík on 14 July 1973. He has four children.

Andri studied Icelandic Literature in the University of Iceland and finished his BA degree in 1997. At that time he had already published three books, two books of poetry and a short story collection. His poetry book, Bónus Poetry, a mythological journey through the isles of an Icelandic Bónus Supermarket, based on the Divine Comedy by Dante became a best seller in 1996.

His children's book, Blue Planet, was the first children's book to receive the Icelandic Literary Prize and has been published in 30 countries. Blue Planet was a 2014 United Kingdom Literacy Association Book Award Winner, an Honor Book for the Nature Generation's 2013 Green Earth Book Award in Children's Fiction, and received the 2002 West Nordic Children's Book Prize and the Janusz Korczak Honorary Award in 2000. The play from the story has been staged in The National Theatre of Iceland, The City Theatre of Reykjavík, at YPT in Toronto, and the City Theatres of Aalborg in Denmark, Lahti and Waasa in Finland and Lucerne in Switzerland.

His Sci-Fi novel, LoveStar, was chosen “Novel of the year” by Icelandic booksellers 2002, received the DV Literary Award and a nomination to the Icelandic Literary Prize, and was awarded the Philip K. Dick Award Special Citation of Excellence in 2013 and the Grand prix de l´imaginaire in 2016 as best foreign Science Fiction in France.

In 2006 he published Dreamland - a Self Help Manual for a Frightened Nation, where he criticises the energy policy of the Icelandic government, marketing Iceland as a source of cheap hydro electricity for international aluminium corporations. At the time the Kárahnjúkar dam was being built in Eastern Iceland, damaging one of the last and largest intact wilderness in Europe. The book became a documentary film, Dreamland (2009 film) directed by Thorfinnur Gudnason, co-directed by Andri.

Andri has collaborated with various artists in film, music, theatre, architecture, activism and design. Collaborators include múm, Högni, Anni Ólafsdóttir, Eivör Pálsdóttir, Björk, Þorleifur Arnarson, Valgeir Sigurðsson, Ásta Fanney, Bjarke Ingels and more..

Andri was vice-president of The Icelandic Writers Union and a board member of The Culture House in Reykjavik. He has been active in the fight against the destruction of the Icelandic Highlands.

In 2021, he won the Writers Award from the Icelandic National Broadcasting Service RÚV.

== Bibliography ==
- Ljóðasmygl og skáldarán – Nykur 1995
- Bonus Poetry (original title: Bónusljóð). Published by Icelandic supermarket chain Bónus in 1996.
- Very Short Stories (original title: Engar Smá Sögur). Published by Mál og menning. 1996.
- Maður undir himni, um trú í ljóðum Ísaks Harðarsonar. Published by University of Iceland Press in 1999.
- LoveStar (published in English by Seven Stories Press)
- The Story of The Blue Planet (published in English by Seven Stories Press) (original title: Sagan af bláa hnettinum. Published by Mál og menning)
- Dreamland – A Self Help Manual For A Frightened Nation (published in English by Citizen Press). (original title: Draumalandið – sjálfshjálparbók handa hræddri þjóð published by Mál og menning in 2006)
- The Time Casket Tímakistan – Mál og menning 2013
- Sofðu ást mín Mál og menning 2016
- Bónusljóð 44% meira (2017)
- On Time and Water Um tímann og vatnið (published in English by Serpents Tail) – Mál og menning 2019
- Jötunsteinn - Mál og menning 2025

=== Plays ===
- Natures Opera (original title: Náttúruóperan) LFMH 1999
- Blue Planet (original title: Blái hnötturinn) Icelandic National Theater 2001
- Hlauptu Náttúrubarn Útvarpsleikhúsið 2001
- Úlfhamssaga Hafnarfjarðarleikhúsið/Annað svið 2004
- Eternal Happiness (original title: Eilíf hamingja) with Thorleif Arnarson – City Theater/ Lifandi Leikhús 2007
- Eternal Misery (original title: Eilíf óhamingja) with Thorleif Arnarson- City Theater/ Lifandi Leikhús 2009

=== Music ===
- Voices/Raddir, Smekkleysa/Stofnun Árna Magnússonar 1998
- Flugmaður – spoken word CD with múm – Leiknótan 1999

=== Films ===
- Dreamland (original title: Draumalandið), Documentary film codirected with Þorfinnur Guðnason. Ground Control Productions 2009.
- The Hero’s Journey to the Third Pole (original title: Þriðji póllinn), Documentary film codirected with Anní Ólafsdóttir. 2020.
- Apausalypse (original title: Tídægra), Documentary film co-directed with Anní Ólafsdóttir. Elsku Rut Productions 2021.

=== Awards ===
- The Icelandic Literary Award 1999 - The Story of The Blue Planet
- The West Nordic Children's Book Award 2002 - The Story of the Blue Planet
- The DV Culture Award for best fiction 2002 - LoveStar
- The Icelandic Bröste Award for Optimism 2002
- The Icelandic Literary Award 2006 - Dreamland
- The Icelandic Film Academy Award for Best Documentary Film 2009 - Dreamland
- The Kairos Prize - 2009
- Green Earth Book Award Honorary Mention 2013 - The Story of the Blue Planet
- The Icelandic Literary Award 2013 - The Casket of Time.
- The West Nordic Children's Book Award 2014 - The Casket of Time
- UKLA Award for best Children's book of 2014 - The Story of the Blue Planet
- Green Earth Book Award Honorary Mention 2014 - The Casket of Time
- The Philip K. Dick Honorary Mention 2014 - LoveStar
- The Grand prix de l'imaginaire 2016, Best foreign Sci-Fi in France - LoveStar
- Premio Tiziano Terzani 2021 Italy, - On Time and Water.
- Water for Life Award 2022 - Aquadotto Pugliese Italy.

== See also ==
- List of Icelandic writers
- Icelandic literature
