= Stolen Life (1998 film) =

- Film poster
- Voleur de vie
- Directed by: Yves Angelo
- Screenplay by: Yves Angelo; Nancy Huston
- Based on: Tímaþjófurinn; 1986 novel by Steinunn Sigurðardóttir
- Produced by: Jean-Louis Livi
- Starring: Emmanuelle Béart; Sandrine Bonnaire
- Cinematography: Pierre Lhomme
- Edited by: Thierry Derocles
- Music by: Angélique Ionatos
- Production companies: Film Par Film; France 3 Cinéma
- Distributed by: AFMD
- Release dates: 4 September 1998 (Venezia); 9 September 1998 (France)
- Running time: 105 minutes
- Country: France
- Language: French
- Box office: 82,618 admissions

Stolen Life (original title: Voleur de vie) is a 1998 French drama film directed and co-written by Yves Angelo and starring Emmanuelle Béart and Sandrine Bonnaire. It is based on a novel by Icelandic author Steinunn Sigurðardóttir.

== Cast ==
- Emmanuelle Béart as Alda
- Sandrine Bonnaire as Olga
- André Dussollier as Jakob
- Vahina Giocante as Sigga
- Éric Ruf as Yann
- André Marcon as Steindor
- Bulle Ogier as The woman in cemetery
- François Chattot as The father
- Rudi Rosenberg as Peter
- Nathalie Richard as Yann's wife
