= Bankster =

Novel by Guðmundur Óskarsson

Bankster: Skáldsaga was the first novel by Guðmundur Óskarsson and the 2009 winner of the Icelandic Literary Prize for fiction.

== Summary ==
The novel takes the form of a diary by its protagonist, Markús. As summarised by Jón Yngvi Jóhannsson:

Bankster is in most respects a well written, traditional, psychological, realist novel, and a good example of the genre. It tells the story of an individual without attempting to any significant degree to put it in a wider or more general context. Markús is a young person who has worked in a bank. He was doing well before the Crash, and seemed absolutely typical of his section of society. He sails more or less unknowingly to his doom just as one imagines the majority of ordinary bank employees have. Along with his wife, he is in a good position to continue his life – well educated, with almost no debts – and doesn't have much to complain about. But what eventuates, on the other hand, is neither a new life nor a development of the old, but rather a familiar downward spiral: the lack of purpose and activity bit by bit take over Markús's life. The only thing he does is to write by himself in the diary that his friend, a historian with an interest in preserving sources about the present, gives him. But writing provides him neither with freedom or a way out of the financial crisis – on the contrary it's as if get gets sucked into it, and the world of authorship threatens his reality and his chances of getting out of this vicious circle.

== Reviews, studies, and relevant interviews ==
- Bergsteinn Sigurðsson. „Er ekki mikið fyrir föndur“. Fréttablaðið 5 December 2009, p. 40 (interview).
- Börkur Gunnarsson. „Skáld, það þarf að skrifa um þetta!“. Morgunblaðið 14 February 2010, pp. 16–17 (interview).
- Guðrún Baldvinsdóttir, „‘Hver á sér fegra föðurland?‘ Þjóðarsjálfsmynd í íslenskum hrunbókmenntum.“ Unpublished BA thesis, Háskóli Íslands, 2014.
- Már Másson Maack, 'Bankster', Hrunið, þið munið.
- Jón Yngvi Jóhannsson, 'Lesið í skugga hrunsins: Um skáldsögur ársins 2009', Tímarit Máls og Menningar, 71.4 (November 2010), 81–98 (p. 95).
- Úlfhildur Dagsdóttir. „Af mikilvægi leiðinlegra bóka.“ Bokmenntir.is, December 2009.
- Þormóður Dagsson. „Fölnaðar framtíðarmyndir.“ Morgunblaðið 12. December 2009, p. 62.
