= Pétur M. Jónasson =

Icelandic zoologist

Pétur Mikkel Jónasson (18 June 1920 – 1 October 2020) was an Icelandic zoologist.

He was born in Reykjavík. He finished his secondary education in Reykjavík, before moving to Copenhagen in 1939 where he took a magister degree. He was employed at the freshwater biology laboratory at the University of Copenhagen from 1957, and held the rank of professor from 1979. He was known for ecological explorations of Suså, Esrum Sø, Mývatn and Þingvallavatn. He was a member of the Royal Danish Academy of Sciences and Letters and from 1986 a member of the Norwegian Academy of Science and Letters.

For his book about Þingvallavatn, he won the Icelandic Literary Prize for academic works in 2002, together with Páll Hersteinsson.
