= Animal Life (novel) =

2020 novel by Auður Ava Ólafsdóttir

- First edition cover
- Author: Auður Ava Ólafsdóttir
- Original title: Dýralíf
- Translator: Brian FitzGibbon
- Language: Icelandic
- Genre: Literary fiction
- Publisher: Benedikt Bókaútgáfa
- Publication date: 2020
- Publication place: Iceland
- English publication date: 6 December 2022
- Media type: Print (hardcover and paperback), ebook, audiobook
- Pages: 205
- ISBN: 9789935488718 First edition hardcover

Animal Life (Dýralíf) is a literary fiction novel by Auður Ava Ólafsdóttir published in Icelandic in 2020 and in English on December 6, 2022.

== Plot ==
Animal Life follows Dýja, a midwife who has kept meticulous count of the number of babies she has delivered since losing her own child in a stillbirth. In her spare time, she works through her late great-aunt Fífa's belongings and tried to make sense of Fifa's worldview and their relationship.

== Development and publication ==
The main character of Animal Life, Dýja, is a midwife. The Icelandic word for midwife is ljósmódir, which is a combination of the Icelandic words for "light" and "mother." Much of Animal Life's thematic content revolves around Dýja's relationship with light and the short winter daylight period in Iceland.

The book's English language release was translated by Brian FitzGibbon and published by Grove Atlantic. It was released on December 6, 2022. It is Ólafsdóttir's seventh novel to be translated into English.

== Reception ==
Connie Biewald, reviewing the book for the San Francisco Chronicle, praised Ólafsdóttir's descriptions of the natural world. The Economist wrote positively of the novel's characters. FitzGibbon's translation work was praised by Cory Oldweiler of The Star Tribune, who wrote that he "seamlessly handled" translating Icelandic culture to a more global audience. Mia Levitin was more critical of the book, writing in the Financial Times that "not much happens in Animal Life in the way of plot" and criticizing the bleak worldview expressed throughout the novel. Publishers Weekly described the book as a "rich slice of life." Kirkus Reviews praised Ólafsdóttir for fact-checking much of the book but criticized Dýja and Fifa's objective worldviews.
