= Bókaútgáfa Menningarsjóðs =

Icelandic publishing company

Bókaútgáfa Menningarsjóðs (Icelandic pronunciation: [ˈpouːkaˌuːtˌkauːva ˈmɛnːiŋkarˌsjouːðs], transl. Cultural Fund Publishing) was a major Icelandic publishing company, based in Reykjavík. Founded before 1953, its editor in 1963 was Arni Böðvarsson.
