= Ragnar Stefánsson =

Icelandic seismologist (1938–2024)

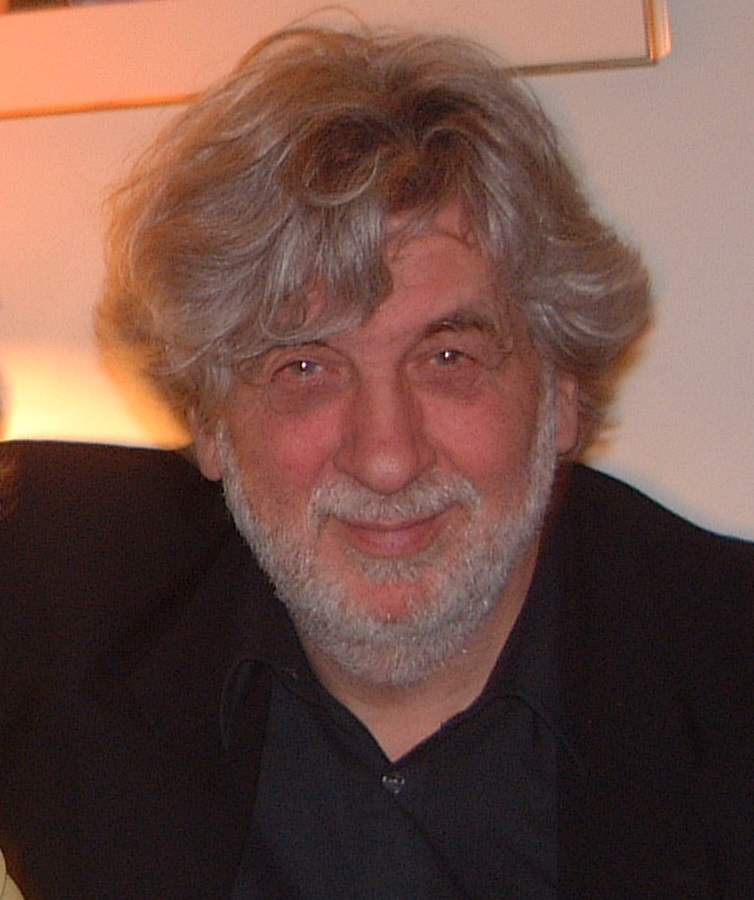
Ragnar Stefánsson in January 2000

Ragnar Stefánsson (14 August 1938 – 25 June 2024) was an Icelandic seismologist and a professor at the University of Akureyri. For 38 years he was the head of the Geophysics Department of the Icelandic Meteorological Office. As an author, he has been collected by libraries worldwide.

== Biography and education ==
Ragnar was born in Reykjavík, the son of Rósa Kristjánsdóttir and Stefán Bjarnason. He completed his Fil.kand exam (B.Sc.) in mathematics and physics from Uppsala University 1961, and Fil. kand in geophysics 1962, and Fil.lic (comparable to Ph.D.) in seismology 1966.

He married Astrid Malmström, a college teacher, in 1961. They had three children. With Björk Gísladóttir he has a daughter. With his second wife Ingibjörg Hjartardóttir, a writer, whom he married in 1990, he has two stepsons. The couple moved from Reykjavík to Svarfaðardalur in North Iceland in 2001, where they lived at Laugasteinn in Dalvík commune. Ragnar's memoir, Það skelfur, was published in 2013.

Stefánsson died on 25 June 2024, at the age of 85.

== Career ==
From 1962 to 1963 and from 1966 to 2003 he was the head of the Geophysics Department of the Icelandic Meteorological Office and in 2004 and 2005 he was the head of its Research Department at the University of Akureyri. In 2005 he was appointed research professor at that University, where he later became professor emeritus.

His main field of work was monitoring and research aimed to mitigate risks due to earthquakes and volcanic eruptions. Because of his duties as the main "earthquake watcher“ of Iceland during four decades he is sometimes known in Iceland by the nickname „Ragnar Skjálfti“, i.e. Ragnar the Earthquake.

From 1980 he led the development of monitoring systems and research aiming to provide advance warnings of earthquakes and volcanic eruptions. He led four international projects in the field of earthquake prediction research from 1988 to 2006. In his 2011 book Advances in Earthquake prediction, Research and Risk Mitigation, Ragnar summarized the main conclusions of his and colleagues research during these 20 years as well as his experience in predicting and warnings ahead of earthquakes and volcanic eruptions.

== Political activity ==
Ragnar was chairman of the Fylkingin (a socialist campaign league) during most of 1966–1984. After moving from Reykjavík to Svarfadardalur in north Iceland he and other locals founded in 2002 the Framfarafélags Dalvíkurbyggðar (Dalvik progressive association) where Ragnar was the chairman for many years. During 2003 – 2008 he was also the chairman of the organization Landsbyggðin lifi (Icelandic rural community association). He was among the founders of the Icelandic political party VG, Vinstri hreyfingin grænt framboð (Left green party) in 1999, and was a member of its party council.

== Publications ==
=== Books ===
- Ragnar Stefánsson (2011) "Advances in Earthquake Prediction, Research and Risk Mitigation”, published in June 2011, by Springer-Verlag in Berlin and Heidelberg in association with PRAXIS Publishing in UK, 271 pages.
- Ragnar Stefánsson (2022) "Hvenær kemur sá stóri? Að segja fyrir um Jarðskjálfta" (When comes the big one? To predict earthquakes). Skrudda ehf, Reykjavik 2022, 220 pages.
- Ragnar Stefánsson (2013) “Þad skelfur”, autobiography published by Skrudda ehf, Reykjavik 2013, 297 pages.

=== Articles in international scientific peer reviewed journals ===
- Stefánsson, R. 1966. The use of transverse waves in focal mechanism studies. Tectonophysics 3(1), 35–60.
- Stefánsson, R. 1966. Methods of focal mechanism studies with application to two Atlantic earthquakes. Tectonophysics 3(3), 209–243.
- Båth, M. & R. Stefánsson 1966. S-P conversion at the base of the crust. Annali di Geofisica XIX(2), 119–130.
- Stefánsson, R. 1979. Catastrophic earthquakes in Iceland. Tectonophysics 53, 273–278.
- Tryggvason, K., E. Husebye & R. Stefánsson 1983. Seimic image of the hypothesized Icelandic hot spot. Tectonophysics 100, 97–118.
- Stefánsson, R. & P. Halldórsson 1988. Strain release and strain build-up in the South Iceland seismic zone. Tectonophysics 159, 267–276.
- Stefánsson, R., R. Böðvarsson, R. Slunga, P. Einarsson, S. S. Jakobsdóttir, H. Bungum, S. Gregersen, J. Havskov, J. Hjelme & H. Korhonen 1993. Earthquake prediction research in the South Iceland seismic zone and the SIL project. Bull. Seismol. Soc. Am. 83(3), 696–716.
- Linde, A.T., K. Ágústsson, I.S. Sacks & R. Stefánsson 1993. Mechanism of the 1991 eruption of Hekla from continuous borehole strain monitoring. Nature 365, 737–740.
- Menke, W., B. Brandsdóttir, S.S. Jakobsdóttir & R. Stefánsson 1994. Seismic anisotropy in the crust at the mid-Atlantic plate boundary in Southwest Iceland. Geophys. J. Int. 119, 783–790.
- Böðvarsson, R., S. Th. Rögnvaldsson, S. S. Jakobsdóttir, R. Slunga & R. Stefánsson 1996. The SIL data acquisition and monitoring system. Seism. Res. Lett. 67(5), 35–46.
- Crampin. S., T. Volti & R. Stefánsson 1999. A successfully stress-forecast earthquake. Geophys. J. Int. 138, F1-F5.
- Ágústsson, K., A.T. Linde, R. Stefánsson & I.S. Sacks 1999. Strain changes for the 1987 Vatnafjöll earthquake in South Iceland and possible magmatic triggering. J. Geophys. Res. 104, 1151–1161.
- Allen, R.M., G. Nolet, Morgan, W.J., Vogfjörð, K.S., Nettles, M., Ekström, G., Bergsson, B.H., Erlendsson, P., Foulger, G.R., Jakobsdóttir, S.S., Julian, B.R., Pritchard, M., Ragnarsson, S. & Stefánsson, R. 2002. Plume-driven plumbing and crustal formation in Iceland. J. Geophys. Res. 107(B8), ESE 4, 1–19.
- Shen, Y., Solomon, S.C., Bjarnason, I.Þ., Nolet, G., Morgan, W.J., Allen, R.M., Vogfjörð, K.S., Jakobsdóttir, S.S., Stefánsson, R., Julian B.R. & Foulger, G.R. 2002. Seismic evidence for a tilted mantle plume and north–south mantle flow beneath Iceland. Earth Planet. Sci. Lett. 197(3–4), 261–272.
- Geirsson, H., Árnadóttir, T., Völksen, C., Jiang, W., Sturkell, E., Villemin, T., Einarsson, P., Sigmundsson, F. & Stefánsson, R. 2006. Current plate movements across the Mid-Atlantic Ridge determined from 5 years of continuous GPS measurements in Iceland. Journal of Geophysical Research,111 (B9) B09407, doi:10.1029/2005JB003717.
- Sturkell, E., Einarsson, P., Sigmundsson, F., Geirsson, H., Ólafsson, H., Pedersen,
- R., De Zeeuw-van Dalfsen, E., Linde, A.T., Sacks, I.S., & Stefánsson, R., 2006:
- Volcano geodesy and magma dynamics in Iceland, Journal of Volcanology and
- Geothermal Research, 150, 14–34, doi:10.1016/j.jvolgeores.2005.07.010. (2006).
- Wyss, M and Stefánsson. R (2006). Nucleation points of recent main shocks in southern Iceland mapped by b-values. Bull. Seismol. Soc. Am. 96, 599–608, doi:10.1785/0120040056.
- Zencher, F., M. Bonafede, and Ragnar. Stefánsson (2006). Near lithostatic pore pressure at seismogenic depths: a thermo-poro-elastic model, Geophys. J. Intern.,166, 1318–1334 doi: 10.1111/j.1365-246X.2006.03069.x.
- Bonafede, M., C. Ferrari, F. Maccaferri, and Stefánsson, R. (2007), On the preparatory processes of the M6.6 earthquake of June 17, 2000, in Iceland, Geophys. Res. Lett. (GRL), 34, L24305, doi:10.1029/2007GL031391. (2007).
- Angelier, J., F. Bergerat, F., Stefánsson, R., Bellou, M. (2008) Seismotectonics of a newly formed transform zone near a hotspot: Earthquake mechanisms and regional stress in the South Iceland Seismic Zone.Tectonophysics, volume 447 95–116, doi:10.1016/j.tecto.2006.07.016. (2008).
- Stefánsson, R., Gudmundsson G.B., and Halldórsson, P. Tjörnes fracture zone. New and old seismic evidences for the link between the North Iceland rift zone and the Mid-Atlantic ridge.Tectonophysics 447, 117–126. (2008).
- Sturkell, E., Einarsson, P., Roberts, M.J., Geirsson, H., Gudmundsson, M.T., Sigmundsson, F., Pinel, V., Gudmundsson, G.B., Ólafsson, H., and Stefánsson, R. (2008), Seismic and geodetic insights into magma accumulation at Katla subglacial volcano, Iceland: 1999 to 2005, J. Geophys. Res., 113, B03212, doi:10.1029/2006JB004851. (2008)
- Stefánsson R., Bonafede, M, and Gudmundsson G.B. (2011) Earthquake prediction research and the year 2000 earthquakes in the South Iceland Seismic Zone. Bulletin of the Seismological Society of America (BSSA); v. 101; no. 4; p. 1590-1617; DOI: 10.1785/0120090093. (2011).
