= Directorate of Education (Iceland) =

Directorate of Education (Icelandic: Menntamálastofnun) is an Icelandic governmental institution that provides educational material to students of primary and upper secondary schools in Iceland, supervises the educational system, and conducts standardized testing. It was formed in 2015 (10 years ago) when it took over the responsibilities of the National Centre for Educational Materials (Námsgagnastofnun) and the Educational Testing Institute (Námsmatsstofnun).
