= Steinunn Sigurðardóttir =

Icelandic poet and novelist

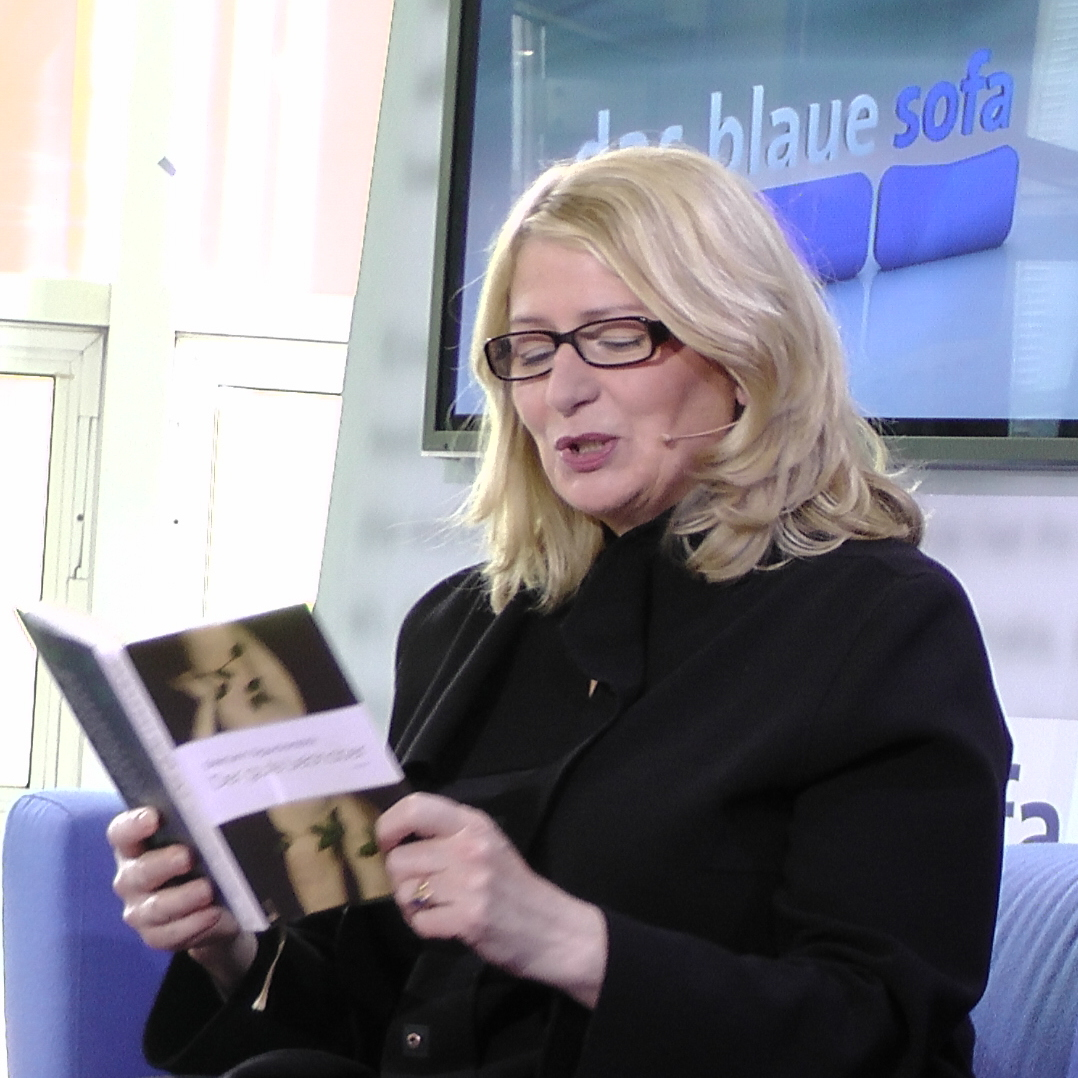
- Steinunn Sigurðardóttir in 2011
- Born: 26 August 1950 (age 76); Reykjavík, Iceland
- Occupations: Poet, novelist
- Writing career
- Notable awards: Icelandic Literary Prize (1995)

Steinunn Sigurðardóttir (born 26 August 1950) is an Icelandic poet and novelist.

She finished her university studies in 1972 with a BA in psychology and philosophy at University College Dublin. Since then, she has worked as a journalist for radio and television. She has lived in different places in Europe, the United States and Japan. Since the mid-nineties, she has mostly lived abroad − first in Paris, now in Berlin.

== Career ==
At the beginning of her writing career, until the 1980s, she published poems and short stories, thus becoming rather well known in her country.

In 1995, she received the Icelandic National Prize for Literature for her novel Hjartastaður (Heart Place). In this novel, the author describes the difficult relationship between a mother living alone with her teenage daughter and the young girl. The text is integrating some elements of a road movie, because the protagonists are on a journey through Iceland from Reykjavík to the east coast. At the same time, a gang of drug dealers, friends of the daughter, are in hot pursuit. This sounds a bit like a crime novel, but the author is more interested in the psychology of the relationship and in descriptions of Iceland's south and its nature, for example a sandstorm.

Her first novel Tímaþjófurinn (The Thief of Time, 1986) was also a big success. In this novel, the love between two teachers is in the center of the story. The woman is rather experienced and living in the High Society because of her family background, whereas her younger colleague is married and more concentrated on his work than she. The style of the novel is interesting: Poems are integrated in the text. In 1998, the novel was turned into a film in France under the title Stolen Life directed by Yves Angelo.
