= Auður Ava Ólafsdóttir =

Icelandic writer (born 1958)

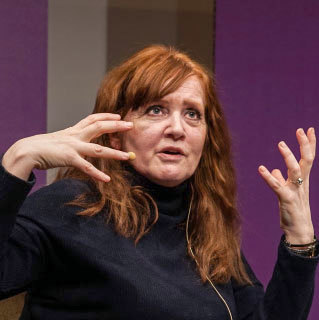
Auður at LiteratureXchange Festival in Aarhus (2019)

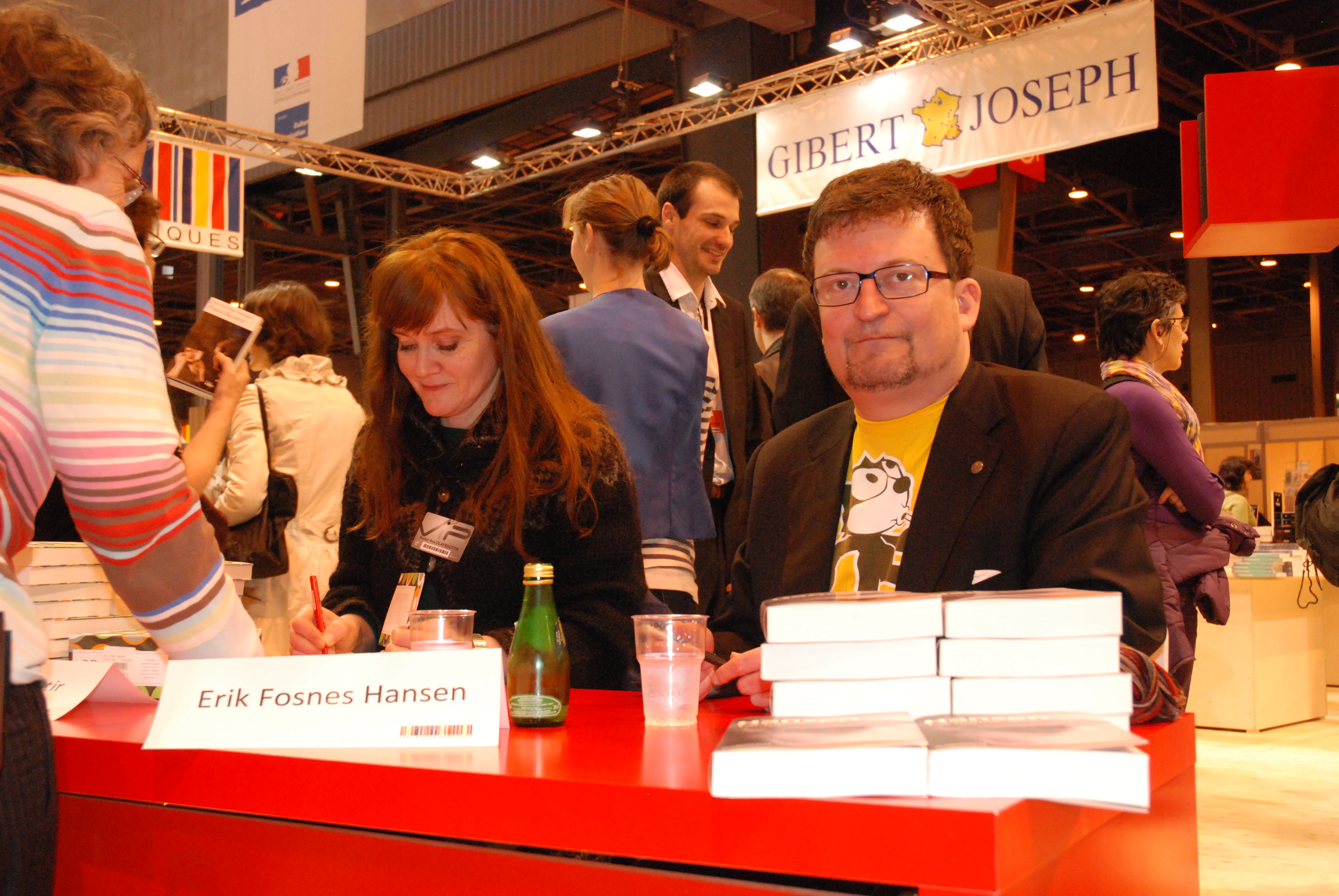
Auður Ava Ólafsdóttir and Erik Fosnes Hansen (March 2011)

Auður Ava Ólafsdóttir (born 1958) is an Icelandic professor of art history, a novelist, playwright and poet. She received the Nordic Council Literature Prize for Hotel Silence in 2018 and the Médicis Foreign Award for Miss Iceland in 2019.

== Early life and education ==
Auður Ava Ólafsdóttir was born in 1958, in Reykjavík. She studied history of art at the Sorbonne, Paris, France.

== Career ==
Auður works as an assistant professor of art history at the University of Iceland. For a time, she was the director of the university's Art Museum.

Her first novel Upphækkuð jörð (Raised Earth) was published in 1998. It set the stage for her future works in its fine dissection of the smaller things in life.

Her book Rigning í nóvember (Butterflies in November) was lauded as a "moving, layered and optimistic piece of writing". The book won the Tómas Guðmundsson Literary Award.

In 2009, she published Afleggjarinn (The Greenhouse) to mixed reviews. It was described as meticulous and finely crafted, yet lacking tension both in its language and friction in its emotion. It was also described as a sweetly comic and wry observation of sex, manhood, death and parenthood.

== Personal life ==
Auður has revealed that her temporary residence in Catholic countries and her deep interest in their art and music led her to convert to Catholicism.

== Works ==
=== Novels ===
- Upphækkuð jörð (Raised Earth), 1998
- Rigning í nóvember, 2004, in English as Butterflies in November, in German as Ein Schmetterling in November
- Afleggjarinn, 2007, in English as The Greenhouse, also translated into French, Spanish, Dutch and Italian
- Undantekningin (The Exception), 2012
- Ör (Scar), 2016, in English as Hotel Silence, also translated into Portuguese, Swedish (Ärr) and Estonian as Arm.
- Ungfrú Ísland, 2018, in English as Miss Iceland, also translated into French
- Dýralíf, 2020, in English as Animal Life.
- Eden, 2022
- DJ Bambi, 2023

=== Poetry ===
- Sálmurinn um glimmer (The Psalm of Glimmer), 2010

=== Theatre ===
- Swans mate for life (National Theatre of Iceland, 2014)

== Awards ==
- 2018 - Bókmenntaverðlaun Norðurlandaráðs: Ör
- 2016 - Íslensku bókmenntaverðlaunin: Ör
- 2011 - Prix des libraires du Québec: Rosa Candida (Afleggjarinn í franskri þýðingu Catherine Eyjólfsson). Í flokknum þýðingar (Roman hors Québec)
- 2010 - Prix de Page (Frakkland): Rosa Candida
- 2008 - Menningarverðlaun DV í bókmenntum: Afleggjarinn
- 2008 - Fjöruverðlaunin, bókmenntaverðlaun kvenna: Afleggjarinn
- 2004 - Bókmenntaverðlaun Tómasar Guðmundssonar: Rigning í nóvember

== See also ==
- List of Icelandic writers
