= Kalpana Wilson =

Academic and author

- Occupations: Academic, author

Academic background
- Education: University of Sussex (BA Hons, MA Area Studies (South Asia))
- Alma mater: SOAS University of London (PhD)

Academic work
- Discipline: Geography
- Sub-discipline: South Asia
- Institutions: London School of Economics; SOAS University of London; Birkbeck, University of London

Kalpana Wilson is an author and scholar with a focus on South Asia. She is a founding member of the South Asian Solidarity Group. She has taught at the London School of Economics, SOAS University of London, and Birkbeck, University of London.

== Education ==
Wilson completed a Bachelors with Honors and a Masters in Area Studies (South Asia) from the University of Sussex, and a PhD in Political Economy from SOAS University of London.

== Career ==
Wilson has taught at the Gender Institute at the London School of Economics, where her research focus was on Bihar, India. She has also taught at SOAS University of London and is a Lecturer in Geography at Birkbeck, University of London, where her research focus includes South Asia diasporas.

During her career, Wilson has written in a variety of forums, including in The Guardian and elsewhere about population control policies. She has also signed a variety of open letters with other academics, including in 2020 to condemn the 2020 Jawaharlal Nehru University attack, in 2019 to protest the Indian government response to violence against women, in 2016 to protest caste discrimination, and in 2015 to call for Narendra Modi to be held accountable for human rights abuses in India.

== Personal life ==
She is the daughter of John Wilson and Amrit Wilson and is married to Dipankar Bhattacharya. They have a daughter.

== Selected works ==
=== Books ===
- Wilson, Kalpana (2012). Race, Racism and Development: Interrogating History, Discourse and Practice. Bloomsbury Academic. ISBN 9781848135123.
- Madhok, Sumi; Phillips, Anne; Wilson, Kalpana, eds. (2013). Gender, Agency, and Coercion. London: Palgrave Macmillan. ISBN 978-0-230-30032-3.

=== Book contributions ===
- Wilson, Kalpana (2007). "Agency." In Georgina Blakeley and Valerie Bryson (eds.), The Impact of Feminism on Political Concepts and Debates. Manchester: Manchester University Press, 126–145.
- Kalpana Wilson (2011). "From missionaries to microcredit? 'Race', gender and agency in neoliberal development". In Visvanathan, Nalini; Duggan, Lynn; Wiegersma, Nan; Nisonoff, Laurie (eds.). The Women, Gender and Development Reader. Bloomsbury Publishing. ISBN 9781848135888.
- Wilson, Kalpana. (2013). "Agency as 'Smart Economics': Neoliberalism, Gender and Development." In Gender, Agency and Coercion, edited by S. Madhok, A. Phillips, and K. Wilson, 84 – 101. London : Palgrave McMillan.
- Ramamurthy, Anandi and Wilson, Kalpana (2018). "'An act of struggle in the present': History, education and political campaigning by South Asian anti-imperialist activists in Britain". In: Choudry, Aziz and Vally, Salim (eds.) Reflections on Knowledge, Learning and Social Movements: History's Schools. Routledge Advances in Sociology. London, UK: Routledge. ISBN 9781138059108
- Wilson, Kalpana (2018). "Development". In: Bleiker, R. (ed.) Visual Global Politics. Interventions. London, UK: Routledge. ISBN 9780415726078.
- Wilson, Kalpana (2021). "Racism, imperialism and international development". In: Farris, S. and Skeggs, B. and Toscano, A. and Bromberg, S. (eds.) The SAGE Handbook of Marxism. SAGE Publications. ISBN 9781473974234

=== Journals ===
- Cornwall, Andrea, Jasmine Gideon, and Kalpana Wilson. (2008). "Reclaiming Feminism: Gender and Neoliberalism." IDS Bulletin 39 (6): 1–9.
