= Hlemmur (disambiguation) =

Hlemmur is a city square and bus terminal in Reykjavík, Iceland. Hlemmur may also refer to:

- Hlemmur (film), an Icelandic documentary released in 2002
- Hlemmur (soundtrack), the soundtrack for the film by Sigur Rós
