= Nýhil =

Defunct Icelandic press and writing association

- Founded: 2001-2004
- Founders: Eiríkur Örn Norðdahl; Haukur Már Helgason
- Defunct: 2011
- Country of origin: Iceland
- Headquarters location: Reykjavík
- Publication types: Experimental literature

Nýhil was an Icelandic avant-garde small press and association of young writers, founded around 2001-2004 by Eiríkur Örn Norðdahl and Haukur Már Helgason, followed shortly by Grímur Hákonarson, and ceasing operation around 2011.

== History ==
The group's 'most active years were between 2004 and 2009'. The group was noted for its social criticism and international outlook, publishing over 50 volumes, and bringing over 40 writers from abroad to its poetry festivals. For a period beginning in spring 2006 the group ran a poetry bookshop in the premises of Bad Taste Records on Laugavegur. The group has also been identified as one of the sources of left-wing critical thinking that underpinned Iceland's 2009 'Pots and pans revolution'.

The group also ran an international poetry festival, whose seventh iteration took place in the Norræna húsið in autumn 2010.

The collective drew to a close as its main members emerged into the Icelandic literary mainstream. Prominent Icelandic authors who have published extensively with Nýhil include Eiríkur Örn Norðdahl and Óttar M. Norðfjörð. However, its members were linked with a series of 'radical summerschools' which began in 2009 (Nýhil published the summerschool's first proceedings in that year as Af marxisma), and the summerschools have continued.

== Publications ==
Here follows a complete list of publications named as being by Nýhil in the Icelandic national library catalogue Gegnir.

=== Novels ===
- Örvitinn eða hugsjónamaðurinn. Óttar Martin Norðfjörð (text); Inga Birgisdóttir (pictures). Reykjavík: Nýhil, 2010
- Konur. Steinar Bragi. Reykjavík: Nýhil, 2008
- Eitur fyrir byrjendur. Eiríkur Örn Norðdahl. Reykjavík: Nýhil, 2006

=== Essays/non-fiction/biography ===
- Íslensk menningarpólitík. Bjarki Valtýsson. Reykjavík: Nýhil, 2011
- Arkitektinn með alpahúfuna: ævisaga Sverris Norðfjörð. Óttar M. Norðfjörð. Reykjavík: Nýhil, 2009
- Af marxisma. ed. by Magnús Þór Snæbjörnsson and Viðar Þorsteinsson. Reykjavík: Nýhil, 2009
- Íslam með afslætti. ed. by Auður Jónsdóttir & Óttar Martin Norðfjörð. Reykjavík: Nýhil, 2008
- Gissurson: hver er orginal?. Óttar Martin Norðfjörð. Reykjavík: Nýhil, 2008
- Hólmsteinn: holaðu mig, dropi, holaðu mig: 2. bindi í ævisögu Hannesar Hólmsteins Gissurarsonar. Óttar M. Norðfjörð. Reykjavík: Nýhil, 2007
- Hannes: nóttin er blá, mamma. Óttar Martin Norðfjörð. Reykjavík: Nýhil, 2006
- Af ljóðum. Ed. by Eiríkur Örn Norðdahl. Reykjavík: Nýhil, 2005

=== Norrænar bókmenntir ===
In 2006, Nýhil made a deal with Landsbankinn that the bank would pay for 130 copies of the nine books in the Nýhil series Norrænar bókmenntir to be distributed to libraries throughout Iceland. They were:

Author	Title	Year
Eiríkur Örn Norðdahl	Blandarabrandarar (die Mixerwitze)	2005
Haukur Már Helgason	Rispa jeppa	2005
Kristín Eiríksdóttir	Húðlit auðnin	2006
Ófeigur Sigurðsson	Roði	2006
Óttar M. Norðfjörð	Gleði & glötun	2005
Tinna Timian	Litli kall strikes again	2006
Valur Brynjar Antonsson	Eðalog: drög að vísindaljóðlist 21. aldar	2006
Þórdís Björnsdóttir	Og svo kom nóttin	2006
Örvar Þóreyjarson Smárason	Gamall þrjótur, nýir tímar	2005

=== Other poetry and experimental writing ===
- Gengismunur: ljóð úr skýrslu rannsóknarnefndar alþingis. Jón Örn Loðmfjörð. Reykjavík: Nýhil, 2010
- Gjá. Haukur Már Helgason, ed. by Kári Páll Óskarsson. Reykjavík: Nýhil, 2010
- Grimm ævintýri. Ásgeir H. Ingólfsson (text); Gunnlaugur Starri Gylfason (pictures). Reykjavík: Nýhil, 2010
- Endalok: úrval ljóða. Trausti Breiðfjörð Magnússon. Reykjavík: Nýhil, 2010
- Sjálf kvíslast ég. Hildur Lilliendahl. Reykjavík: Nýhil, 2009
- Af steypu. ed. by Eiríkur Örn Norðdal and Kári Páll Óskarsson. Reykjavík: Nýhil, 2009
- FALN 2009: 5ta alþjóðlega ljóðahátíð Nýhil 2009 = Nýhíl international poetry festival V 2009 NIPF. Reykjavík: Nýhil, 2009
- Ég hata alla!: ... da ra ra raaa. Bryndís Björgvinsdóttir. Reykjavík: Nýhil, 2009
- Högg á vatni. Hermann Stefánsson. Reykjavík: Nýhil, 2009
- Sori: manifestó. Valerie Solanas, trans. by Dr. Usli. Reykjavík: Nýhil, 2009
- Úr skilvindu drauma. Arngrímur Vídalín. Reykjavík: Nýhil, 2009
- Það sem mér finnst helst að heiminum.... Ingólfur Gíslason. Reykjavík: Nýhil, 2009
- Usli: kennslubók. Dr. Usli. Reykjavík: Nýhil, 2009
- Með villidýrum. Kári Páll Óskarsson. Reykjavík: Nýhil, 2008
- Fréttir frá mínu landi: óspakmæli og örsögur. Ármann Jakobsson. Reykjavík: Nýhil, 2008
- Tvítólaveizlan. Ófeigur Sigurðsson. Reykjavik: Nýhil, 2008
- Gáttir: þýðingarit 4ðu alþjóðlegu ljóðahátíðar Nýhils = Gateways: translation of the 4th intl. Nýhil poetry festival: Reykjavík 22.-24. ágúst 2008. ritstjóri = editor Kári Páll Óskarsson. Reykjavík: Nýhil, 2008
- Síðasta ljóðabók Sjóns. Celidonius. Reykjavík: Nýhil, 2008
- Þess á milli. Ingvar Högni Ragnarsson. Reykjavík: Nýhil, 2008
- 3ja alþjóðlega ljóðahátíð Nýhils: Reykjavík 12.-14. október 2007: Þjóðleikhúskjallaranum og Norræna húsinu. Reykjavík: Nýhil, 2007
- Þjónn, það er Fönix í öskubakkanum mínum!: ljóðasafn. Eiríkur Örn Norðdahl. Reykjavík: Nýhil, 2007
- Biblía gáfaða fólksins. Gils N. Eggerz. Reykjavík: Nýhil, 2007
- Sekúndu nær dauðanum: vá, tíminn líður!. Ingólfur Gíslason. Reykjavík: Nýhil, 2007
- Handsprengja í morgunsárið: baráttukvæði. Ingólfur Gíslason & Eiríkur Örn Norðdahl. Reykjavík: Nýhil, 2007
- Fenrisúlfur. Bjarni Klemenz. Reykjavík: Nýhil, 2006
- Barkakýli úr tré: ljóðabók. Þorsteinn Guðmundsson. Reykjavík: Nýhil, 2006
- Storie S: schemes. Th,. J.B. (texts); Th., J.B. (translation); J.B. (pictures). Reykjavík: Nýhil, 2006
- Svavar Pétur & 20. öldin. Haukur Már Helgason. Reykjavík: Nýhil, 2006
- AÁBCDÐEÉFG .... Aórtt M. Ððfjnorrö. Reykjavík: Nýhil, 2006
- Úfin, strokin. Örvar der Alte. Reykjavík: Nýhil, 2005
- Ást æða varps. Ófeigur Sigurðsson and others, ed. by Haukur Már Helgason & Ófeigur Sigurðsson. Reykjavík: Nýhil, 2005
- Sirkus. Óttar Martin. Reykjavík: Nýhil, 2005
- Ofurmennisþrá: milli punkts og stjarna. Valur Brynjar Antonsson. Reykjavík: Nýhil, 2004
- Grillveður í október. Óttarr m. Reykjavík: Nýhil, 2004
- Af okkur. ed. by Viðar Þorsteinsson. Reykjavík: Nýhil, 2004
- Á íslensku má alltaf finna Ginsberg [audiobook]. Allen Ginsberg, trans. and read by Eiríkur Örn Norddahl, with music by Gísli Magnússon. Reykjavík: Nýhil, 2003
- Handlöngun. Ófeigur Sigurðsson. Reykjavík: Nýhil, 2003
- Spegilmynd Púpunnar: greatests shits. Hallvarður Ásgeirsson. Reykjavík: Nýhil, 2003
- 2004. Haukur Már Helgason. Reykjavík: Nýhil, 2003
- Af stríði. ed. by Haukur Már Helgason. Reykjavík: Nýhil, 2003
- Nihil obstat. Eiríkur Örn Norðdahl. Reykjavík: Nýhil, 2003
- Heimsendapestir. Eiríkur Örn Norðdahl. Reykjavík: Nýhil, 2002
