= Heimska =

First edition

Heimska ('stupidity'), published by Mál og menning in 2015, is the fifth novel by the Icelandic author Eiríkur Örn Norðdahl. It was chosen best Scandinavian fiction by the French literary magazine Transfuge.

== Summary ==
The novel is written in the third person, making some use of free indirect discourse and occasional included texts such as an email, an essay, and a book review. It is divided into ten sections, and ninety-four short chapters.

The action is set in Ísafjörður, implicitly in the near future. In addition to social media prominent at the time of the novel's composition (Facebook, Instagram and Skype are all mentioned, for example), it is usual for people to install webcams throughout their homes, enabling others to watch them at will. Drones also serve as flying eyes. Despite this highly technologised setting, for much of the novel there are irregular, unexpected power-cuts.

The main characters are Áki and Leníta Talbot, a narcissistic, sex-obsessed couple around their late thirties, who are also among Iceland's pre-eminent novelists, and whose fractious relationship has for most of their careers generated the artistic inspiration that each needs. Fairly significant appearances are also made by Leníta's twin sister Tilda and Tilda's husband Ragúel.

The novel begins by explaining that Áki and Leníta have separated. Each had just finished drafting a novel and revealed its content to the other. It turns out that both wrote a novel set in the early twenty-first century about a man called Akmeð. In each, Akmeð migrates from a majority-Islamic country to Iceland as a youth. He becomes an Islamic-fundamentalist terrorist, joins ISIS, and fights in the Syrian Civil War, before being found dead in a house on Laugavegur. (Chapter XLVI, apparently a review of the books, partly reproduced on the cover of Heimska, provides explicit commentary on the pomposity of two white authors largely ignorant of Islam writing this story.) Although Heimska mentions that the publishers' lawyers conclude that there is no plagiarism case to bring, Áki and Leníta are each convinced that the other has stolen their idea, and Áki moves out of their shared home into Hótel Ísafjörður, establishing an office in a disused seafood factory nearby.

Both enter a period of profound creative block and devote their energies to trying to hurt each other emotionally, principally by sending each other video footage of themselves having sex with other people. This activity comprises a significant part of the book. It includes Leníta recording footage of a drunken Áki having sex with a teenager called Marý Steinsdóttir, which Leníta posts on an internet pornography site. In revenge, Áki posts footage of Leníta having sex with a barman in Tenerife, Bob Bourequat.

Around section 6 of the novel, Iceland experiences an extended power-cut; section 6 itself comprises a series of vignettes portraying different people around Ísafjörður coping with the disappearance of electricity from their lives. The power-cut is followed by an email sent to most of the country's citizens claiming that one Birta Sóllilja has cut the power in order to promote calmer lifestyles and a more viable future.

Through a flashback, the novel then explains that the furore over the publications of the videos of Áki and Leníta having sex with Marý and Bob leads Marý and Bob themselves to meet and become a couple, while Marý is studying art in Reykjavík. Their friend Drafbjartur Þór Lie convinces them and another friend, Guðrún (Grun) Valsdóttir, to help him with his final degree project. He has been inspired to emulate the terrorist plot which Akmeð is described to plan in Áki's novel Akmeð, which involves shutting down Iceland's power through computer hacking and physical destruction. The team successfully applies for a grant to hire the Finnish computer hacker Sirpa Hietala, whose politics are inspired by the controversial deep ecologist Pentti Linkola, and move to Ísafjörður to undertake their artistic project, working in the same disused factory as Áki.

Following the power-cut, the police arrest Drafbjartur, Grun, Marý and Bob, and in unspecified circumstances kill Sirpa. However, they also believe that Áki is part of the plot, and torture him when he (who has not even noticed Marý's presence at the factory) refuses to confess. He consequently dies in police custody, and the police successfully claim that the internal bleeding that caused his death was the consequence of Áki's own dissolute lifestyle.

== Translations ==
- Dumhet, trans. by John Swedenmark (Malmö : Rámus, 2016) [Swedish]
- Heimska : la stupidité, trans. by Éric Boury (Paris : Éditions Métailié, 2017) [French]

== Reviews ==
- Anna Kristín Halldórsdóttir, 'Heimska – Ógeðfelld framtíðarsýn á Ísafirði', Pjatt.is (5 March 2016)
- Kristján Guðjónsson, 'Heimska: Eiríkur Örn Norðdahl skrifar um nánd og firrð í sýnileikaþjóðfélaginu í nýjustu skáldsögu sinni ', Pressan (7 January 2016)
- Sólveig Ásta Sigurðardóttir, 'Sjálfhverful framtíð', Tímarit Máls og menningar, 77.1 (2016), 139-143
