= Gæska: Skáldsaga =

2009 novel by Eiríkur Örn Norðdahl

- Author: Eiríkur Örn Norðdahl
- Language: Icelandic
- Genre: Magical realism
- Published: Reykjavík
- Publisher: Mál og menning
- Publication date: 2009
- Publication place: Iceland
- ISBN: 9789979330974

Gæska: Skáldsaga ('Kindness: A Novel') is the third novel by the Icelandic author Eiríkur Örn Norðdahl, written in Helsinki and Ísafjörður between 2007 and 2009.

== Form ==
The novel is often surreal or magical-realist, with many more-or-less impossible events taking place, often without explicit comment on their oddness. For example, the novel adverts to a spate of women jumping from tall buildings, but the fatal consequences of these leaps never seem to eventuate; Mount Esja is undergoing a volcanic eruption for almost the whole of the novel, ceasing at the end in a moment of pathetic fallacy; and ninety-three million refugees arrive, without explanation, in Iceland. Direct speech is sometimes in literary prose rather than realistic.

The novel is divided into two halves, one set before and one after a revolution caused by an economic meltdown, which brings an all-woman, left-wing government to power. Particularly in the first half, material is narrated in all three persons, each person being associated with narration from a different character's point of view:

- First person: Halldór Garðar, a right-wing MP, married to Millý, a left-wing MP. The story-arc of the novel is demarcated by Halldór's realisation, at the beginning, that his life and work is essentially meaningless; and his discovery, by the end, of a purpose, fundamentally through recognising the central importance of kindness as a source for life's meaning.
- Second person: Freyleif, personal assistant to Millý.
- Third person: used for a wider range of purposes, but in the first half particularly for the perspective of Óli Dóri, Freyleif's husband; and in the second for narrating the experiences of Millý, Freyleif, and a Moroccan refugee, Fatíma.

The novel also includes a number of quoted verses, and, particularly in the first half, biblical allusions.

== Content ==
In the first half of the novel, which takes place over seven days, Halldór Garðar and Freyleif both suddenly find themselves facing dramatic mid-life crises: Halldór after falling into a career as a callous right-wing politician, Freyleif after devoting all her energy to the well-being of the people around her, particularly her family. Halldór flees his job as an MP (and his wife), taking up residence at the Hótel Borg, on Austurvöllur, the square where the Icelandic parliament building stands. Freyleif begins threatening her husband to commit suicide by jumping from the block of flats where she lives, before going out on the town and having sex with a stranger.

Meanwhile, Austurvöllur fills with people from all walks of life: protesters, entrepreneurs, and the poor trying to cope with Iceland's crumbling economic situation. Here Halldór meets Amelía, the daughter of Moroccan refugees Kadír and Fatíma, whom the Icelandic state has arrested in order to eradicate their traditions to replace them with stereotyped nationalist Icelandic culture. With the help of Freyleif and to a lesser extent the hapless Halldór, Amelía rescues her parents. Thereafter, Halldór and Kadír absent themselves from the action, locking themselves in a room in Halldór and Millý's flat. Fatíma and Amelía stay with Freyleif, however. They assist Freyleif with her soup kitchen on Austurvöllur.

The second half, which takes place over four days, picks up the story after a revolution has happened bringing Millý to power at the head of an all-woman government, with Freyleif at her side. Millý reluctantly tries to convince the lecherous head of the International Monetary Fund, Aimé De Mesmaeker, to give Iceland a loan by having sex with him. She later, however, refuses a loan on the grounds that the IMF tends not to act in people's best interests anyway. Meanwhile, Fatíma also takes a central role in completing the first purpose-build Reykjavík Mosque, partly with the help of a surprised Óli Dóri, bringing her feminism to the centre of its activities. The denouement of the novel sees ninety-three million refugees arrive in Iceland, with Millý's purposeful, humanitarian and humanist embracing of their arrival as an opportunity for Iceland rather than a threat; Fatíma leading the first service in the new mosque; and the reuniting of Halldór and Kadír with their families. The end of the novel does not resolve Iceland's immigration crisis, but a positive tone is struck.

== Relations to real events ==
The novel has a great deal in common with events of the 2008–11 Icelandic financial crisis, but the first half was written before those events unfolded. Eiríkur Örn has written that it

leaves off moments after the economic collapse (which, having been written before the actual collapse, looks quite a bit different from real life) and resumes “a while later this same endless summer” – meaning that it too contains a gap where the actual “action” took place, and does not deal directly (unsymbolically) with the events of Austurvöllur or the crisis itself.

In the estimation of Guðrún Baldvinsdóttir,

the Utopian ending of the book is improbable and becomes ironic when looked at in comparison with Icelandic society in reality. Its typical dualism, good and evil, male and female, wealth and poverty, and others, can save the utopian world but unlikely to do so in reality. Things are more complicated than that, and the author of the book points to the alienation which dwells in our mentality. It also makes fun of a mentality that can often be found in the discourse of Icelandic society, that Iceland is somehow important for the international community. Although the national self-image may crash, it is built up again on the illusion that in the end it will come about that it is us who will save the world.

== Reviews and studies ==
- Anna Emelie Heuman, '„Allt sem ég gerði skorti innihald.“ Þýðing á Gæsku eftir Eirík Örn Norðdahl og inngangur að henni', unpublished BA thesis, University of Iceland, 2014; http://hdl.handle.net/1946/18171.
- Björn Þór Vilhjálmsson, ‘Þjóðarbrot’, Tímarit Máls og menningar, 71.1 (February 2010), 136–43.
- Guðrún Baldvinsdóttir, '„Hver á sér fegra föðurland?“ Þjóðarsjálfsmynd í íslenskum hrunbókmenntum', unpublished BA thesis, University of Iceland, 2014; http://hdl.handle.net/1946/17953.
- Hrund Ólafsdóttir, 'Esjan logar', Sunnudags Moggin (15 November 2009), [timarit.is/view_page_init.jsp?issId=335244&pageId=5285268&lang=is&q=kreppub%F3k 52]
- Jón Yngvi Jóhannsson, 'Lesið í skugga hrunsins: Um skáldsögur ársins 2009', Tímarit Máls og Menningar, 71.4 (November 2010), 81–98 (pp. 96–97).
- Ragnheiður Eiríksdóttir, 'Forfallinn jólabókaflóðslesari', Sunnudags Moggin (14 March 2010), 53.
