= Steinar Bragi =

Icelandic writer

- Born: 15 August 1975 (age 51)
- Writing career
- Genre: Poetry

Steinar Bragi (full name: Steinar Bragi Guðmundsson) is an Icelandic writer born 15 August 1975. He has been called 'Iceland's foremost contemporary author, in the estimation of many'.

== Career ==
At the age of 23 he published his first book of poetry, Svarthol, and his first novel, Turninn ('the tower'), was published in 2000. He studied comparative literature and philosophy at the University of Iceland. In 2008, his book Konur ('Women') received great critical and commercial success and was nominated for the Nordic Council literature prize. Current affairs, particularly the 2008–11 Icelandic financial crisis, are prominent in his work from 2008 onwards, such as Konur and Hálendið: Skáldsaga. Steinar Bragi is sometimes considered to be in the "new wave" of younger Icelandic authors influenced by popular culture and in his case the grotesque, with influences from horror writers such as H. P. Lovecraft. He is also notable as a poet.

Most of Steinar Bragi's early writing was published by the Icelandic publishing house Bjartur. In 2008, however, he changed to Mál og menning. During the transition, his novel Konur was accordingly first published by the avant-garde collective Nýhil before being republished by Mál og menning.

== Works ==
- Svarthol (Black Hole), poems, Nykur, 1998
- Augnkúluvökvi (Eyeball Liquid), poems, Nykur, 1999
- Turninn (The Tower), prose, Bjartur, 2000
- Ljúgðu gosi, ljúgðu (Lie, Pinocchio, Lie), poems, Bjartur, 2001,
- Áhyggjudúkkur (Worrydolls), novel, Bjartur, 2002
- "Draumar um bin Laden" (Dreams of bin Laden), play, On War, Nýhil, 2003
- Sólskinsfólkið (The Sunshine People), novel, Bjartur, 2004
- Litli kall strikes again (Little Guy Strikes Again), prose, Nýhil, 2005
- Útgönguleiðir (Exits), prose, Nýhil, 2005
- Hið stórfenglega leyndarmál Heimsins (The Magnificent Secret of The World), novel, Bjartur, 2006
- Konur (Women), novel, Nýhil, 2008; 2nd ed. Mál og Menning, 2009
- Himinninn yfir Þingvöllum: Þrjár sögur (The Sky Over Þingvellir: three stories), novels, Mál og menning, 2009
- Hálendið: Skáldsaga (The Highlands), novel, Mál og menning, 2011
- Reimleikar í Reykjavík (The Haunting of Reykjavík), JPV, 2013
- Kata (Katie), novel, Mál og menning, 2014
- Allt fer (Everything Goes), short stories, Mál og menning, 2016
- Truflunin (The Disturbance), novel, Mál og menning, 2020
- Dáin heimsveldi (Dead Empires), novel, Mál og menning, 2022
- Gólem (Golem), novel, Mál og menning, 2024
