= SL lífeyrissjóður =

- Trade name: SL lífeyrissjóður
- Native name: Söfnunarsjóður lífeyrisréttinda
- Type: Pension fund (open fund)
- Founded: September 26, 1974; 52 years ago
- Founder: Ministry of Finance
- Headquarters: Borgartún 29, Reykjavík, Iceland
- Key people: Guðmundur Stefán Steindórsson (managing director)
- Services: Pension savings; Pension payments; Loans to members; Investments
- Total assets: ISK 292.2 billion (2024)
- Website: sl.is

Söfnunarsjóður lífeyrisréttinda, or SL lífeyrissjóður, (also referred to in English as The General Pension Fund or SL Pension Fund) is an independent pension fund in Iceland.

The fund was founded in 1974 and operates as an open pension fund for wage earners and self-employed people who have not met their mandatory pension insurance obligation through membership in another pension fund.

In 2018 it was Iceland's ninth-largest pension fund, with assets of about ISK 163 billion and accrued pension rights for roughly 150,000 members. The fund has never reduced pension payments to its members. As of the end of 2024, its total assets were reported at ISK 292.2 billion.

== History ==
SL lífeyrissjóður was founded on 26 September 1974 within the Ministry of Finance following legislation that made pension-fund membership mandatory for wage earners. It was originally called Biðreikningur lífeyrisiðgjalda and served people who did not belong to public-sector pension funds or trade-union-linked pension funds.

The fund grew in part by absorbing ten smaller pension funds. The fund managed its assets through the 2008–2011 Icelandic financial crisis without curtailing members’ pension entitlements.

In November 2018, the fund formally adopted the working name SL lífeyrissjóður. That year it received recognition from Verdicta for the highest return among Icelandic open mutual insurance pension funds over the previous 20 years, with an average annual return of about 5%.

Sigurbjörn Sigurbjörnsson served as the fund's managing director from 1 October 1997 until he stepped down in 2025. Guðmundur Stefán Steindórsson became managing director on 1 June 2025.

== Governance ==
Under the fund's statutes, the Minister appoints the board of directors for four-year terms, in accordance with the fund's governing legislation and statutes.

== Operations and investments ==
SL lífeyrissjóður is an open pension fund, independent of banks and trade unions. Membership is available to wage earners and self-employed people who are not required to contribute to another pension fund and who have not otherwise met their mandatory pension insurance obligation.

The fund operates under Iceland's pension-fund legislation and provides entitlements including old-age, disability and survivors’ pensions. Its investment policy has been described as cautious, including relatively modest targets for domestic equity investments compared with other Icelandic pension funds, alongside a comparatively high share of foreign assets and broad international diversification.
