= Píslarvottar án hæfileika =

2010 novel by Kári Tulinius

Píslarvottar án hæfileika: Saga af hnattvæddri kynslóð ('Martyrs without talent: A history of a globalised generation') is the first novel by Kári Tulinius, published in 2010 by JPV.

== Form ==
The novel is in prose, with several quotations of free verse by one of the characters, Lilja, and passages where the prose style itself could be seen to drift into free verse. Chapters are short, and chapter titles prosaic and sometimes detailed, evoking eighteenth-century novels (for example, 'Á leiðinni á annan fund terroristaklúbbsins' [on the way to the second meeting of the terrorist club'] and 'Frásögn Geira af ferð sinni til Palestínu' [Geiri's account of his journey to Palestine]). The novel is divided into two parts, the first part ('fyrri hluti') set in September 2008 and the second ('seinni hluti') set in November 2008. The narrative of the novel's present is presented linearly and in the present tense. However, chapters set in the novel's present are interspersed with chapters, whose titles state the year in which they are set, narrating flashbacks, mostly concerning the principal character, Sóli. These passages in particular are characterised by an absence of punctuation, and at times depart from conventional typographical layouts, using layout to artistic effect in the style of concrete poetry. The language throughout the novel tends to be colloquial, and dominated by realistic direct speech.

== Summary ==
The principal characters are Sóli, Markús, Geiri, Lilja and Dóra, well educated twenty-to-thirty-something would-be radicals living in 101 Reykjavík. At the opening of the story, they form a ‘terroristaklúbb’ ('terrorist club'), whose name points firmly to their integration into US-driven discourses of the ‘war on terror’, and naively unreflective attitude to what living up to their name might really entail. They are mostly depicted meeting and chatting in bars in the town, where they discuss left-wing revolutionaries and plot a terrorist attack. They struggle, however, to agree on a name for the group, much less on the deed itself, and the relationships between them are complicated by sexual attractions and liaisons. Their main achievement is to gain the opportunity to send two of their number to travel to Palestine as aid workers. Eventually Geiri and Dóra are chosen, but Dóra is killed by being run over by a tank (evoking the death in 2003 of Rachel Corrie). Her death comes just as the 2009 ‘kitchenware revolution’ is gathering pace, so that what should be the terroristaklúbb’s moment to shine is cast into shadow, putting the characters’ inability to act meaningfully within their own society—let alone elsewhere—in a particularly stark light.

The flashbacks of the novel mostly concern formative moments in Sóli's life, not least an early life in which his mentally unstable mother prevents him discovering a world outside their house.

== Reviews and related interviews ==
- Bergrún Andradóttir, 'Píslarvottar án hæfileika', HRUNIÐ, þið munið: Gagnabanki um samtímasögu.
- Einar Falur Ingólfsson, 'Af byltingarsinnum og kattarvinum', SunnudagsMogginn (6 June 2010), p. 54.
- Ásgerður Júlíusdóttir, 'Misleitar manneskjur', Morgunblaðið, 21 May 2010, p. 43.
- 'Nennti ekki að vera kvíðin', DV (19 May 2010), p. 21.
