= Halldór Guðmundsson =

Icelandic author

Halldór Guðmundsson (born 1956 in Reykjavík) is an Icelandic author. He was also chairman of the publishing company Mál og menning and its successor after the merger with JPV, Forlagið.

His biography of Halldór Laxness was awarded the Icelandic Literary Prize. The book has also appeared in English and German.

Halldór's 2006 book Skáldalíf, about the Icelandic writer Gunnar Gunnarsson, was chosen best biography of the year by the Icelandic Booksellers' Association and nominated for the Icelandic Literary Prize.

In We are all Icelanders (2009), he discusses how the 2008 financial crisis affected ten different Icelanders, including an architect, a politician and a kindergarten nurse.

In Mamutschkas Lebensrezepte, published in German, he tells the story of restaurant operator Marianne Kowalew.

== Publications ==
- Loksins, loksins: vefarinn mikli og upphaf íslenskra nútímabókmennta. Reykjavík: Mál og menning, 1987. OCLC 22972223
- Halldór Laxness—ævisaga. Reykjavík: JPV, 2004. ISBN 9979-781-61-0. English ed. trans. Philip Roughton: The Islander: A Biography of Halldór Laxness. London: Maclehose Press, Quercus, 2008. ISBN 978-1-84724-284-6
- Skáldalíf: ofvitinn úr Suðursveit og skáldið á Skriðuklaustri. Reykjavík: JPV, 2006. ISBN 978-9979-798-06-4
- Mamutschkas Lebensrezepte. Ed. and trans. Regina Kammerer. Munich: Random House-Bertelsmann, 2010. ISBN 978-3-442-75228-7
