= Borgartún =

Street in Reykjavík, Iceland

Coordinates: 64°08′45″N 21°54′02″W

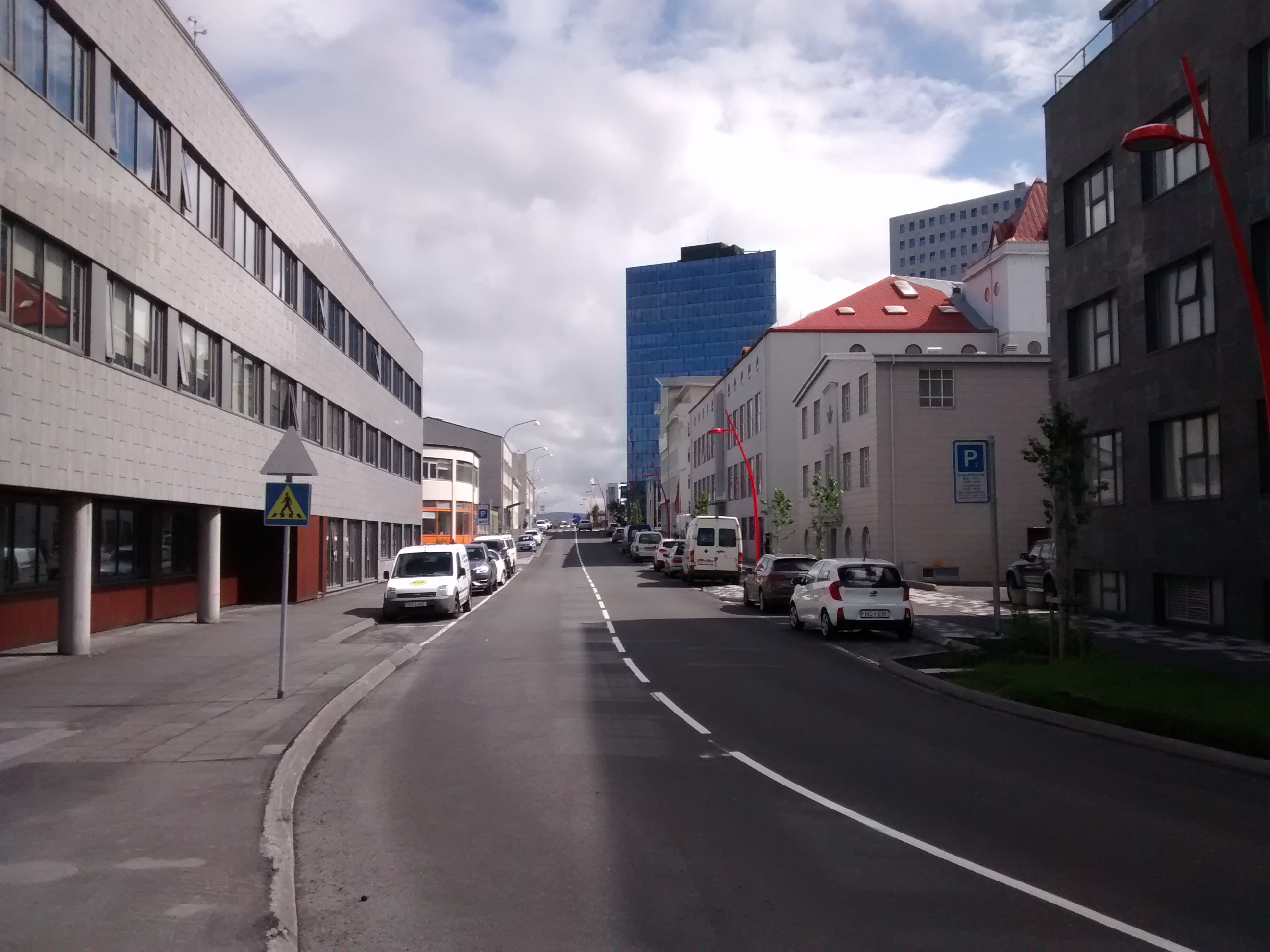
Borgartún

Borgartún (Icelandic pronunciation: [ˈpɔrkarˌtʰuːn]) is a street in Reykjavík, Iceland, that in years leading up to the country's economic crisis became the centre of the city's financial district. Borgartún runs east to west, its westernmost point being at the intersection with Snorrabraut and its easternmost point being at the intersection with Laugarnesvegur and Sundlaugavegur.

A 19-story skyscraper, part of the Höfðatorg development, is located at Borgartún. As of 2012, the skyscraper is completed but the rest of the development remains unfinished. The location of the skyscraper has been controversial because it is located opposite a low-density residential street.

Also located in Borgartún is Höfði, a house built in 1909. Initially, it was the house of the French consul in Iceland. It was the place of the Iceland Summit when Ronald Reagan and Mikhail Gorbachev met there in 1986. It is now mainly used for ceremonies for the Reykjavík City municipality.

The western end of Borgartún houses a complex of buildings where the offices of many departments of the Reykjavík city government, including a centralised service centre, are housed. The service centre is home to the Icelandic national registry, Þjóðskrá Íslands. The national statistical office Statistics Iceland is also situated at Borgartún.

== Notable companies ==
Notable companies housed on Borgartún and its surrounding streets include, but are not limited to;

- The Embassy of China
- Gildi
- Efling
- The Embassy of Poland
- Reykjavíkurborg
- Advania
- Skatturinn
- Origo
- Þjóðskrá
- Statistics Iceland
- Kvika Banki
- Arion Banki
- Vörður
- TM
- Landsvirkjun
- Motus
- Directorate of Health

== Transport ==
For the time being, Borgartún is a main artery in Iceland's main transport system, Strætó. The main bus station of Reykjavík, Hlemmur, has been closed for renovations as of 2024, rerouting most bus traffic that used to drive Laugavegur, down Borgartún. The bus stops Rúgbrauðsgerðin and Höfðatorg act as temporary link stations for routes 2, 4, 5, 12, 14, 15, 16, 17, 104 and 105. Bus stops along Borgartún include Rúgbrauðsgerðin, Höfðatorg, Borgartún and Sóltún.

== See also ==
- Laugavegur (Reykjavík): the main shopping street in Reykjavík
