= Hálendið (novel) =

2011 novel by Steinar Bragi

Hálendið: Skáldsaga
- Author: Steinar Bragi
- Language: Icelandic
- Subject: 2008–11 Icelandic financial crisis
- Genre: Fiction
- Publisher: Mál og menning
- Publication date: 2011
- Publication place: Iceland
- Media type: Print
- Pages: 253 pp.
- ISBN: 978-9979332312
- OCLC: 810563160

Hálendið (literally "The Highlands") is a 2011 novel by Steinar Bragi published by Mál og menning. It enjoyed very positive reviews.

== Synopsis ==
=== Characters ===
The novel is implicitly set around the time of the 2008–11 Icelandic financial crisis. It has four main characters, whose back-stories and psychological peculiarities the novel gradually develops through narratorial exposition and the characters' own flashbacks and conversations:

- Hrafn, born into an elite Icelandic family, who after a troubled youth has become a leading entrepreneur in Iceland's financial boom.
- Vigdís, Hrafn's girlfriend, who, notwithstanding the death of her mother in a car accident and a distant father, has done well in her education and become a psychiatrist.
- Egill, a childhood friend of Hrafn's who despite heavy drinking and womanising has by dint of hard work become a lawyer and also a leading player in Iceland's financial boom.
- Anna, Egill's girlfriend, noted in the novel for her sexual drive, who is a successful journalist and writer. She brings with her her dog Tryggur.

=== Plot ===
The four go on holiday in the Icelandic highlands, driving in a jeep to the south of Askja. Losing the road in foggy darkness, Hrafn accidentally drives the jeep into the wall of a house mysteriously located in the highland desert, making the jeep unusable and forcing the characters to demand the reluctant hospitality of the house's two inhabitants: an old woman, Ása; and an old man who in the characters' estimation is at an advanced stage of Alzheimer's disease. The novel is quick to imply that there is something strange and dangerous about the situation.

With no mobile phone signal and unsure of their location, the characters seek to find a way to reach civilization and get help, and the plot of the novel largely comprises the failure of these efforts. On the first day they try to drive to a village in an old jeep which Ása lends them, but it crashes in a pothole (which Hrafn thinks may be newly dug) and they walk home. Tryggur goes missing overnight.

On the second day Hrafn, Vigdís, and Egill try walking north to get a phone signal; Anna stays behind with an injured ankle. The walkers soon find a dam in a glacial river and an abandoned settlement, and explore the village, finding disturbing, man-made piles of animal bones, one surmounted with a photograph of Vigdís sleeping, taken with her own polaroid camera. Hrafn attacks Egill due to factors including old enmities and Egill's apparent lust for Vigdís, and the three become separated, returning home separately through a sandstorm. Meanwhile, Anna explores the house, discovering the old man's office and that he is one Kjartan Aðalsteinsson, a doctor and one-time member of the Icelandic business elite, associated with Björgólfur Guðmundsson and Margrét Þóra Hallgrímsson. From the office she finds a hidden room containing a bed, a pistol, and a switch labeled 'see me' which, when pressed, gives her a serious electric shock. Piecing clues together, Anna concludes that Kjartan had a child by his own sister, and the family moved to the highlands to escape public shame. It is also implied that he was 'a once-famous scientist who has undertaken dangerous experiments on human subjects'.

On the third day, Egill and Anna set off at daybreak without telling Hrafn and Vigdís, as Egill wishes to escape from Hrafn. Before going far, they find Tryggur's collar with an arrow made with stones pointing down the gully through which the glacial river runs. Following this sign, Egill enters a tunnel in the gully's side, sees a mutilated Tryggur, and nothing more is seen of either in the novel. It later emerges than Anna follows Egill into the tunnel. Setting off later, Hrafn and Vigdís find Anna and Egill's bags; Hrafn sees that their tracks enter the tunnel but do not emerge, but does not tell Vigdís, and the two return to the house through another sandstorm. That night, the electricity cuts out and various other unnerving developments occur, leading up to a knock on the door. Despite Ása's demands, Hrafn and Vigdís open it to find Anna wrapped in fishing line stolen from their car and mutilated, primarily by the removal of her fingers and tongue, blinded and deafened. She bears a message which appears to be an attempt by Egill to ask for help.

Early on the fourth day, Hrafn and Vigdís set off to look for Egill. The narrative perspective shifts to Hrafn and as he becomes increasingly confused or indeed deranged, it becomes increasingly unclear to the reader how reliable the account is. It is implied that Hrafn either is or starts to believe himself responsible for at least some of the violence that has taken place. Hrafn and Vigdís become separated during an increasingly confused sequence, and Hrafn returns to the house and for the first time tries to explore the basement; the sequence ends with what appears to Hrafn's mental return to a childhood trauma.

The novel closes with a confused account of Vigdís being discovered wandering naked in the highlands, the police investigating events at the 'house', and Vigdís's hospitalisation. Yet it also appears at this stage that the house was in fact a large rock; 'thereupon the reader has to wonder whether everything that goes on in between [the car-crash and the ending] was only hallucinations, triggered by the consumption of alcohol and drugs, but above all by the powerful impulse to self-destruction which the four young people experience'.

== Form and themes ==
The novel is written in the third person. It contains a map of the region where the novel is set (p. 6) and a reproduction of Seb Patane's 'Four Generations' (p. 182). It is divided into four sections: 'Eyðimörkin' ('the desert', 12 chapters), 'Það hefur enga sál' ('it has no soul', 12 chapters), 'Húsið' ('the house', 11 chapters), and 'Náttúra' ('nature', 1 chapter). The narratorial perspective shifts from one character to another, explicitly labelling from whose perspective each sequence of chapters is presented.

The novel has been understood as a self-conscious Icelandicisation of the American genre of the horror story, showing the influence of, amongst others, H. P. Lovecraft, and making subtle use of traditional Icelandic folklore. Thus, for example, Vigdís fulfils the trope of the final girl, while the fact that the house is in fact a rock recalls the homes of trolls and elves in Icelandic folklore, as does the name of Ása herself.

The novel prominently addresses the power of the natural world in Iceland, and the lack of understanding and respect of the characters for it; Icelandic culture at the height of the early twenty-first century boom; and characters' psychology.

== Translations ==
- Steinar Bragi, Excursion, trans. by Patrick Guelpa, Bibliothèque nordique (Paris: Métailié, 2013), ISBN 9782864249399 (in French)
- Steinar Bragi, Höglandet: Roman, trans. by Inge Knutsson (Stockholm: Natur & Kultur, 2014), ISBN 9789127137479 (in Swedish)
- Steinar Bragi, De hoogvlakte, trans. by Kim Liebrand (Amsterdam: Uitgeverij Luitingh-Sijthoff, 2015), ISBN 9789024567744 (Dutch)
- Steinar Bragi, Højlandet, trans. by Rolf Stavnem (København: Gyldendal, 2015), ISBN 9788702174007 (Danish)
- Steinar Bragi, Felföld, trans. by Utassy Ferenc (Budapest: Animus, 2015), ISBN 9789633242469 (Hungarian)
- Steinar Bragi, Ødemarken, trans. by Silje Beite Løken (Oslo: Gyldendal, 2016), ISBN 9788205481848 (Norwegian)
- Steinar Bragi, Sumu, trans. by Tuomas Kauko (Helsinki: Like, 2016), ISBN 9789520112547 (Finnish)
- Steinar Bragi, The Ice Lands, trans. by Lorenza Garcia (London: Macmillan, 2016), ISBN 9781509832064 (English)
- Steinar Bragi, Planina, trans. by Lucie Korecká (Zlín: Kniha Zlin, 2016), ISBN 9788074733994 (Czech)
- Steinar Bragi, El silencio de las tierras altas, trans. by Enrique Bernárdez (Barcelona: Ediciones Destino, 2016), ISBN 9788423350148 (Spanish)

== Sources ==
- Úlfhildur Dagsdóttir (2012). "Hryllilegar hremmingar á hálendinu". Tímarit Máls og menningar (in Icelandic) (4): 112–17.
