= Konur (novel) =

2009 novel by Steinar Bragi

Konur is a 2008 Icelandic novel by Steinar Bragi. It enjoyed considerable critical and commercial success, was nominated for the Nordic Council's Literature Prize, and has been widely translated.

== Synopsis ==
The novel is set in Reykjavík during the boom that preceded the 2008–11 Icelandic financial crisis. The protagonist of the novel is Eva, an Icelander who spent most of her formative years in California, and works as an artist. Largely estranged from her family, recently abandoned by her long-term partner Hrafn (and emotionally scarred by the cot-death some years before of her daughter by him), and implicitly without a very successful career, Eva moves from New York to Reykjavík, taking up the offer of an Icelandic banker, Emil Þorsson, to house-sit his flat, in one of the new developments on Sæbraut, opposite the sculpture Sólfar.

After a series of somewhat strange encounters with neighbours which serve as opportunities to develop Eva's character and back-story, and to build narrative tension, Eva finds herself locked into the flat, a situation that persists for most of the novel. It emerges that the flat is full of hidden cameras and it is implied that Eva is in fact part of an art installation by a famous Serbo-Croatian artist, Joseph Novak. Eva is forced to follow instructions she receives by telephone to put her face into a face-shaped impression in the bedroom wall; while wearing this 'mask' she loses consciousness and generally finds herself unable to remember what happens to her.

The third-person narrative is recounted largely from the point of view of Eva while not wearing the mask, during which time she often drinks heavily or takes sedatives. Eva makes attempts to escape, but is unsuccessful. The narrative focuses on the psychological torment inflicted on Eva by her imprisonment and her efforts to understand what happens to her while wearing the mask. It is hinted that she is (or at least believes she is) variously sexually abused; paraded as a celebrity at parties for the elite of the banking and art worlds; reunited with Hrafn; and eventually celebrated herself as a successful artist.

Aspects of the story are continued in Steinar Bragi's 2009 Himinninn yfir Þingvöllum: Þrjár sögur.

== Analyses ==
Eiríkur Örn Norðdahl has read the novel in relation to the 2008–11 Icelandic financial crisis:

Konur might be construed as a crisis-novel, where the newly-built house of nouveau riche plenty, owned by a “financial viking”, turns on the inhabitant, starts torturing her before literally (and symbolically) devouring her. It is in all ways a novel written about the times pre-crisis and it successfully demonstrates the seeds of the city’s, and the country’s, self-destruction, through a kind of symbolic pre-cognition.

In the assessment of Jürg Glauser, Konur is 'one of the books most obviously pessimistic about culture that have appeared in iceland in recent years'. He finds that the novel, 'a relentless story of the exploitation of the female body by contemporary art and media, draws an even deeper link between modern city architecture and the decay of the ethical foundations of society. In this text, contemporary architecture has reached an almost apocalyptic dimension and represents evil in itself'. Other commentary too has focused on the novel's explorations of warped domestic spaces and the status of women.

The novel has also been analysed by Örn Orri Ólafsson in relation to horror fiction and Victorian Gothicism, and by Viðar Þorsteinsson as an exploration of life under neoliberalism during the Icelandic banking boom.

== Bibliographic details of the original and translations ==
- Steinar Bragi, Konur (Reykjavík: Nýhil, 2008), ISBN 9789979657378; 9789979989615 (ib.); 9979657375; 9979989610
- Steinar Bragi, Konur, 2nd edn (Reykjavík: Mál og menning, 2009), ISBN 9789979330240; 9979330244
- 'Love and Art: An Excerpt From Konur by Steinar Bragi', trans. by Alda Kravec, Iceland Review 47 (4) (2009), 38-39 (English)
- Steinar Bragi, Kvinnor, trans. by Inge Knutsson (Stockholm: Natur & Kultur, 2010), ISBN 9789127121966; 9127121968 (Swedish)
- Steinar Bragi, Installation, trans. by Henrý Kiljan Albansson (Paris: Métailié, 2011), ISBN 9782864247364; 2864247364 (French)
- Steinar Bragi, Kobiety, trans. by Jacek Godek (Warzawa: Wydawnictwo Krytyki Politycznej, 2011), ISBN 9788361006992; 8361006990 (Polish)
- Steinar Bragi, Frauen, trans. by Kristof Magnusson (München: Kunstmann, 2011), ISBN 9783888977244 (ib.); 388897724X

== Sources ==
- Icelandic Literature Center review
