= Hnefi eða vitstola orð =

2013 poetry book by Eiríkur Örn Norðdahl

First edition (publ. Mál og Menning)

Hnefi eða vitstola orð (in the author's translation, Fist or words bereft of sense) is the sixth poetry book by Eiríkur Örn Norðdahl, published by Mál og menning in 2013. It is explicitly about the 2008 Icelandic financial crisis and associated Kitchenware Revolution and comprises 137 poems, plus a foreword, itself in sonnet form. In the estimation of Jakob Bjarnar, 'Eiríkur Örn certainly earns his writer's stipend; he tears up the workings of poetry while he monitors the value of the króna fall to nothing. A really amusing volume.'

== Form ==
The work is composed in free verse. Apart from the first ('Formáli: kreppusonnettan', or, in the author's translation, 'Prologue: The Crisis Sonnet') all poems are entitled only 'X.' In the top right-hand corner of each page, the value of the Króna to the Euro is listed, falling from 81.98 on the first page to 172.76 on the last; the exchange rates imply that the poems cover the time period from about 24 July 2008 to 15 May 2009.

== Video version ==
Eiríkur Örn produced a video version of parts of the collection as a contribution to the Litla ljóðahátíðin 2009.

== Poems from the collection in earlier publications ==
Many of the poems appeared, in Icelandic or in translation, in journals before or after the publication of the book:

- Tíu þúsund tregawött, spring 2009
- Tímarit Máls og menningar, vol. 2 2009
- Sprung formal, spring 2009, pp. 1-8 (in English)
- Ars Poetica, spring 2010 (in Slovak)
- 3AM Magazine, spring 2010 (in English, with another excerpt here)
- Stína, vol. 2, 2010
- Rattle, vol. 2, 2011 (in English)
- Dnevi poezija in vina, August 2011 (in Slovenian)
- Lyrikline, 2011 (in Polish and Estonian)
- Skáldagjöf SÁÁ, SÁÁ, 2011
- IWF! IWF! OMG! OMG!, Kozempel & Timm, 2011 (in German)
- Ny islandsk poesi, Arena, 2011 (in Danish)
- Parnasso, spring 2013 (in Finnish)
- DV (1 June 2013)
- Versopolis: European review of Poetry, Books and Culture (n.d.) (in Icelandic and English)

== Reviews ==
- Jakob Bjarnar, 'Ei ríkur Eiríkur ljóðsins', Vísir, 14 October 2015, https://www.visir.is/ei-rikur-eirikur-ljodsins/article/2013710049887/
- Anna Kristín Halldórsdóttir, 'Bækur: Hnefi eða vitstola orð – Fyrir fólk sem hefur gaman af ljóðum', pjatt.is 22 October 2013, http://pjatt.is/2013/10/22/baekur-hnefi-eda-vitstola-ord-fyrir-folk-sem-hefur-gaman-af-ljodum.
- Harpa, 'Mjög hressileg lesning', BB, 14 October 2014, http://www.bb.is/Pages/119?NewsID=184334.
