= Illska =

2012 novel by Eiríkur Örn Norðdahl

First edition

Illska ('evil'), published by Mál og menning in 2012, is an Icelandic novel, the fourth by Eiríkur Örn Norðdahl. It won the 2012 Icelandic Literary Prize for fiction, and was chosen as best Scandinavian fiction by the French literary magazine Transfuge. The book has been widely translated and reviewed.

== Summary ==
Illska is set around 2010. Its main characters are Agnes Lukauskaite, a second-generation Jewish immigrant from Lithuania researching far-right populism for her MA thesis in history at the University of Iceland; her boyfriend Ómar Arnarson, a graduate in Icelandic linguistics left unemployed by the 2008 Icelandic financial crisis; and Arnór Þórðarson, a PhD-student in history and a far-right activist, who becomes Agnes's love-interest later in the novel. The novel intercalates musings in the narratorial voice about racism and right-wing populism, along with an account of Agnes's grandparents' experience of the Holocaust from their home town of Jurbarkas.

== Translations ==
- Illska, la maldad, trans. by Enrique Bernárdez (Xixón, Asturies: Hoja de Lata, 2018) [Spanish]
- Zlo, trans. by Daria Lazić (Zagreb: Oceanmore, 2018) [Croatian]
- Illska: To kako, trans. by Roula Georga Kopoulou (Athens: Polis, 2017) [Greek]
- Illska: le mal, trans. by Eric Boury (Paris: Métailié, 2015) [French]
- Böse, trans. by Betty Wahl and Tina Flecken (Stuttgart: Tropen, 2014) [German]
- Ondska, trans. by Anna Gunnarsdóttir Grönberg (Malmö: Rámus, 2014) [Swedish]
- Ondskab, trans. by Nanna Kalkar (København: Ordenes By, 2013) [Danish]
