= Hlemmur (film) =

2002 Icelandic film

- Directed by: Ólafur Sveinsson
- Music by: Sigur Rós
- Release date: 2002
- Running time: 86 minutes
- Country: Iceland
- Language: Icelandic

Hlemmur is a 2002 Icelandic documentary film directed by Ólafur Sveinsson. It is named after Reykjavík's prior main bus terminal at Hlemmur and revolves around the lives of some destitute men who spend most of their time there. The film received the 2003 Edda Award for Best Documentary.

The soundtrack of this documentary was composed and performed by Sigur Rós. The film and the soundtrack were released together in a limited-edition DVD-CD package in August 2007 on the band's label Krúnk. This was the first time the film was released.
