= Örvitinn; eða hugsjónamaðurinn =

2010 novel

Örvitinn eða; hugsjónamaðurinn (The Idiot, or, the Visionary) is a novel by Óttar M. Norðfjörð, published by Nýhil in 2010. It is illustrated by Inga Birgisdóttir. It has been characterised as 'a meditation on the first decade of the 21st century in novella form, a bildungsroman with close ties to Voltaire's Candide’.

== Form ==
The novella is a third-person narrative, and is an often allegorical satire of Western politics in the first decade of the twenty-first century, particularly the so-called 'war on terror'. It is ostentatiously a tissue of literary and philosophical references, which are catalogued in a long series of endnotes (pp. 137–48). Many of the characters are based on real philosophers or literary characters, and the wording of the text often alludes to other works. Besides Candide, one of the single most direct sources for the novel is the Icelandic folkstory Búkolla.

The novella is divided into thirty short chapters, each beginning with a short summary of the chapter's contents, echoing the conventions of eighteenth-century novels. Eleven begin with an illustration.

== Summary ==
The protagonist is a boy known originally only as strákur Karlsson ('the boy Karl's son', where Karl can itself simply mean 'man'), though different characters bestow various names upon him. Strákur Karlsson grows up in Iceland in a place called Engisstaður, which ostensibly means 'meadow place' but can also be understood as 'no-place'. He is noted for his good-hearted innocence. Wishing to prove himself to his teacher Miss Júnílúnd, he sets out from home aiming to become an author and bring about world peace.

Reaching Reykjavík, strákur Karlsson meets Alfróði (whose name means 'all-wise' but might perhaps better be glossed 'know-it-all', and is inspired by Candide’s Professor Pangloss). Alfróði is a noisy, pretentious, xenophobic racist enamoured of Classical culture who convinces the protagonist that the way to bring about world peace is to join the invasion of Iraq. The two fly to Copenhagen (where inter alia they meet Konstantín Konstantínus). Alfróði reveals that he is not intending to go to Iraq himself and thrusts strákur Karlsson through the checkin. During his journey, the protagonist meets an Iraqi student, feminist, and activist called Scheherazade (but whom the protagonist always calls the arabíska prinsessan ['Arabian princess']) and the two fall in love.

Arriving in Iraq, strákur Karlsson is immediately sent on a mission with a US army unit whose leader is called the King of Hearts; he finds himself participating in the slaughter and rape of innocent Iraqis, and visits the Abu Ghraib prison. At the end of his tour of duty, he finds Scheherazade and she helps him to recover, telling him stories. Strákur Karlsson gives his passport to Scheherazade's brother to enable him to fulfil his dream of going to England to become a Shakespearian actor. Modelling their relationship on that of Peter Abelard and Héloïse d'Argenteuil, strákur Karlsson and Scheherazade have a daughter whom they call Astrolabe. Their marital bliss is destroyed one night when Scheherazade runs out of stories and strákur Karlsson's old army unit bursts in, killing Scheherazade and Astrolabe and arresting the protagonist. He escapes, flees into the desert, and wanders lost and suicidal.

Strákur Karlsson is rescued by Alfróði (who has been sent to find him) and the King of Hearts (who has become a hippy called Genesis). The three become lost in the desert but are rescued by some bedouins who lead them into Afghanistan. Strákur Karlsson makes particular friends with a would-be writer called Djim. Refusing to wear Bedouin clothing to protect himself from the sun, Alfróði goes mad and dies on the way. The group is attacked by three Al-Qaida fighters, who eventually kill everyone apart from Djim and strákur Karlsson. The Al-Qaida fighters are in turn attacked by US forces, who kill them and arrest strákur Karlsson and Djim as terrorists, before flying the two to Greenland, via the Netherlands and Iceland, for torture. Djim is killed in Greenland and strákur Karlsson removed to the Guantanamo Bay detention camp.

Strákur Karlsson is tortured at Guantanamo Bay, eventually learning to invent terrorist plots to please his captors. After meeting Khalid El-Masri, he is visited by God and convinces God to help him escape. God swaps strákur Karlsson's body temporarily with a beetle's, allowing him to fly to Havana. In Havana, strákur Karlsson falls into drinking and womanising before a sex-worker called Pythia takes pity on him an invokes the Olympian gods to restore his mental well-being. Strákur Karlsson begins to write again, composing a poem (in fact borrowed by Óttar from the oeuvre of Steinn Steinarr). He bumps into Alfróði, who turns out not to be dead and likewise to have been captured and interned in Guantanamo Bay. The two determine to escape to Miami. En route, their captain, Harry Morgan, mentions that he had previously given passage to Scheherazade and Astrolabe and that they were heading to England. The ship sinks, but strákur Karlsson and Alfróði manage to swim to Miami.

After meeting Ronald McDonald and getting arrested at the airport, the protagonist and Alfróði manage to fly to England; while they are travelling, the 2008 financial crisis breaks. They tour the UK attending every Shakespeare play in search of Sheherazade's brother, eventually finding him and his sister performing Othello at the Barbican Centre. Reunited with his family (who in fact survived the American attack and tried to find strákur Karlsson in Cuba), strákur Karlsson takes them back to Iceland, where Alfróði finds himself increasingly marginalised on account of his racism. Strákur Karlsson's family return to Engisstaður to find his parents dead. They settle there and he writes Örvitinn; eða hugsjónamaðurinn.

== Reviews ==
- 'Örviti Óttars og skákir föðurins', DV, 22 March 2010, http://www.dv.is/folk/2010/3/22/orviti-ottars-og-skakir-fodurins/
- 'Fávitinn, Ofvitinn, Örvitinn og Óttar M. Norðfjörð: Strákur Karlsson heldur út í heim', Morgunblaðið, 3 March 2010, https://www.mbl.is/greinasafn/grein/1324420/
