= Borgarlína =

Bus network in Iceland

Borgarlína is the name of a proposed BRT network in the capital region of Iceland. The network has been in planning since 2015, and involves upgrading existing road infrastructure to include long stretches of separated public transport lanes. Parts of the network could later be upgraded to light rail.

As of November 2025, about 10 years after Borgarlína was included in the regional plan for the capital area, the system had not begun passenger service as Borgarlína. According to Borgarlínan, the first phase was expected to be ready in 2031, around 16 years after the project was included in the regional plan, although parts of the infrastructure could be used by Strætó before the whole phase was completed.

The project formed part of the wider 2019 capital-area transport agreement, a 120 billion ISK public transport agreement. By 2025, Borgarlínan stated that the full Borgarlína program was estimated at 130.4 billion ISK, representing about 42% of the 311 billion ISK investment plan for the wider agreement. By 1 May 2025, 5.33 billion ISK had been booked to Borgarlína, while the system had not yet begun passenger service. In November 2025, Borgarlínan stated that the first phase was expected to be ready in 2031.

== Phase 1 ==
Borgarlína, as a bus rapid transit (BRT) system, aims to upgrade sections of the existing road infrastructure with long stretches of dedicated lanes for public transport. The lanes of Borgarlína are intended exclusively for public transport vehicles (and emergency services). These dedicated lanes will form the route for the future light rail transit (LRT) in a further phase.

The first phase of Borgarlína involves the construction of a bridge across Fossvogur Bay, which is scheduled to be completed mid-2028. The bridge will be reserved exclusively for public transport vehicles, cyclists and pedestrians.

However, the construction of the first phase of the Reykjavík express bus line Borgarlína has been delayed by the Corona pandemic. According to the updated schedule, the first section of the line is to go into operation in 2026, rather than 2025 as originally planned. The updated plans call for the Hamraborg-Miðborg tunnel to be completed in 2026 and the Ártúnshöfði-Miðborg tunnel in 2027 in the first phase.

For phase 1, 18-meter-long city buses will be purchased. The electric articulated vehicles have space for 125 passengers and have step-free access. The vehicles will mostly drive on special lanes and have priority at intersections, which will result in shorter travel times.

Buses are to run every 7 to 10 minutes during rush hour.

== See also ==
- Strætó
