= Þórbergur Þórðarson =

Icelandic writer and Esperantist

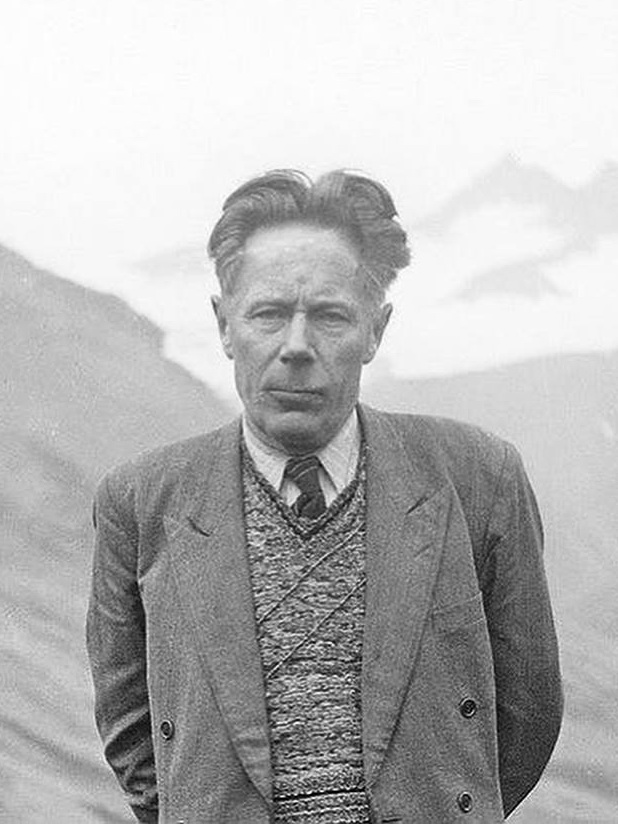
- Born: 12 March 1888; Hali, Suðursveit, Iceland
- Died: 12 November 1974 (aged 86); Reykjavík, Iceland
- Occupations: Writer, poet, essayist
- Spouse: Margrét Jónsdóttir
- Writing career
- Language: Icelandic
- Period: 1924–1970

Þórbergur Þórðarson (Thórbergur Thórdarson) (Hali í Suðursveit, 12 March 1888 (Note: Baptismal registries and census records give Þórbergur Þórðarson's birth year as 1888. However, he himself believed that he was born in 1889, so some references will state that he was born that year.) – Reykjavík, 12 November 1974) was an Icelandic author and Esperantist.

An ironist, satirist, volatile critic, and ground-breaking achiever in experimental auto-fiction, Þórbergur arguably remains among Iceland's most beloved 20th century authors. He is considered one of the popular Icelandic stylists of his day, with a shrewd vocabulary and facility for written expression. Therefore, he was respectfully dubbed "Maestro Þórbergur".

Þórbergur was an autodidact. As recounted in his largely autobiographical works, Íslenzkur aðall (1938) and Ofvitinn (1940), Þórbergur lived in poverty for much of his youth and early adulthood and could not afford secondary or higher education.

== Key years ==
This list of years detailing his life are as follows:

List of notable life details
Year	Notes
1888–1906	Grew up in Suðursveitw
1906–1909	Worked as a ship's cook
1909–1913	Attended school without graduating
1913–1918	Studied literature and philosophy at the University of Iceland but was not allowed to graduate
1916	Began collecting Icelandic vocabulary
1918	Delved into theosophy and yoga
1918–1925	Worked as a teacher
1924	His mistress gave birth to their daughter, Guðbjörg
1925	Devotes his life to Esperanto
1932	Married Margrét Jónsdóttir
1921–1940	Travelled extensively in Europe
1974	Received honorary doctorate from the University of Iceland
Nov 12, 1974	Died at Vífilsstaðir Hospital

In January 1934, Þórbergur wrote a series of essays for the socialist daily Alþýðublaðið, titled "The Nazis' Sadistic Appetite" ("Kvalaþorsti nazista"). Iceland's public prosecutor filed charges against Þórðarson for supposedly offensive clauses in the article, one of which labelled Adolf Hitler "a sadist". The Supreme Court of Iceland agreed with the prosecutor and found the author guilty of "derogating a foreign nation". The court sentenced Þórbergur to pay a fine of 200 krónur.

== English translations ==
The relatively little of Þórbergur's work which has been translated into English consists mainly of fragments from his larger works. Portions of Íslenzkur aðall (1938) were published as In Search of My Beloved in 1967. In recent years, Professor Julian Meldon D'arcy has translated a fragment from Bréf til Láru (1924) as a short story, titled "When I got pregnant", as well as the first full book to appear in English translation: The Stones Speak (2012), Þórbergur's childhood memoirs, originally published as Steinarnir tala in 1956. Further translations are in progress.

== Bibliography ==
- 1912: Nótt (Night), poem
- 1915: Hálfir skósólar
- 1917: Spaks manns spjarir
- 1922: Hvítir hrafnar (reprint of "Hálfir skósólar" and "Spaks manns spjarir")
- 1924: Bréf til Láru (Letters to Lára)
- 1938: Íslenzkur aðall (Portions published in English as "In Search of my Beloved" by Twayne Publishers, 1967)
- 1940–1941: Ofvitinn (The Eccentric)
- 1941: Edda (poetry by Þórbergur)
- 1947: Í Suðursveit
- 1945–1950: Ævisaga Árna Þórarinssonar prófasts, (memoirs of Árni Þórarinsson)
- 1954–1955: Sálmurinn um blómið (The Hymn about the Flower)
- 1956: Steinarnir tala (Published in English as The Stones Speak by Mál og menning, Reykjavík 2012)
- 1956-1958: Trilogy about Suðursveit district
- 1960: Ritgerðir 1924–1959 (essays)
- 2010: In the Footsteps of a Storyteller (excerpts accompanied by photographs, Forlagið 2010)

While only major work by Þórbergur are listed above he also wrote a number of essays and other pieces on a variety of subjects, besides writing in the international language of Esperanto.

== Museum ==
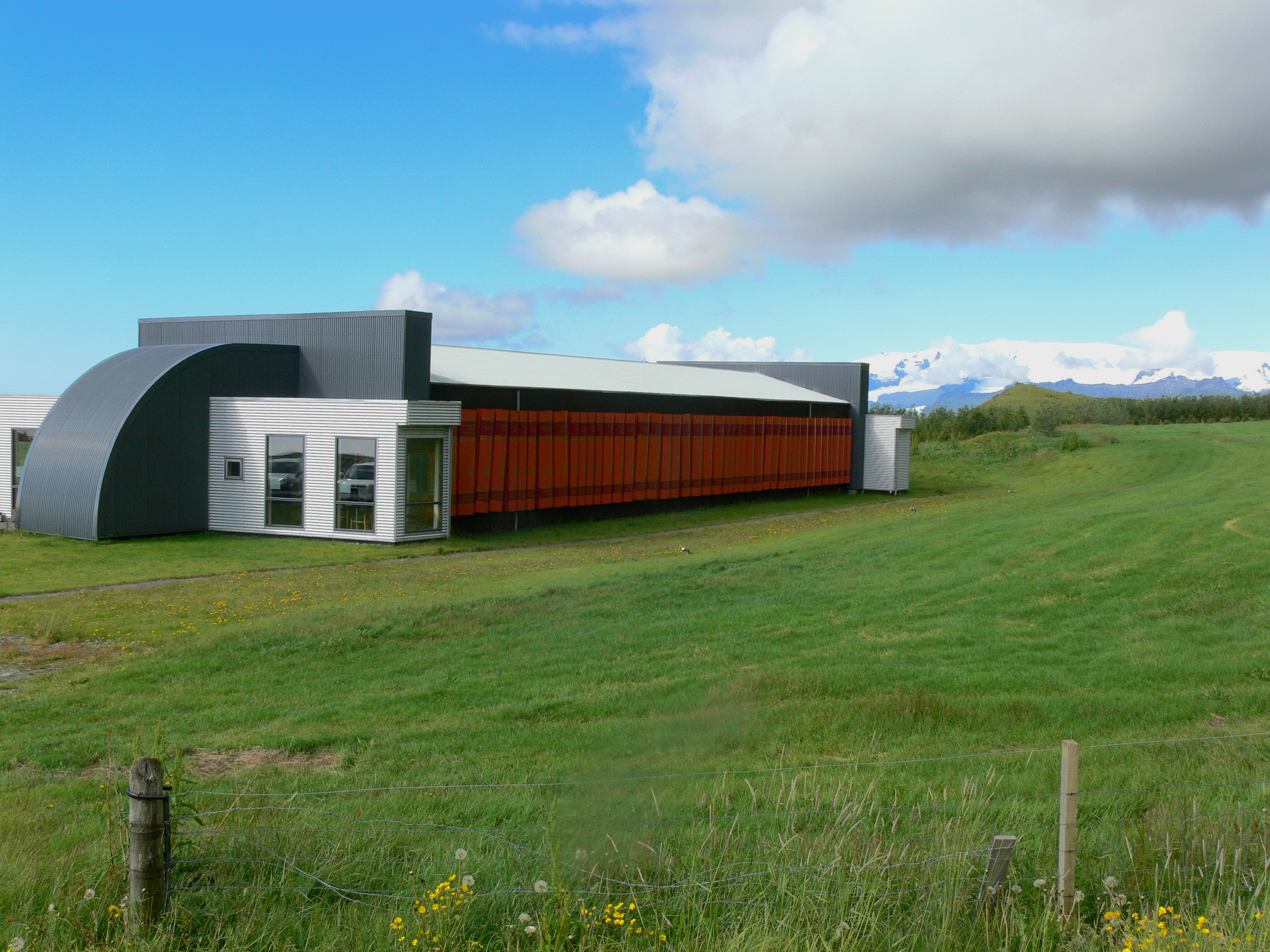
Þórbergssetur museum and cultural centre in Hali, Suðursveit

On 30 June 2006, a museum and cultural centre was opened in Hali, Suðursveit. It is called the Þórbergssetur, and is dedicated to Þórbergur's work and life.
