= Eiríkur Örn Norðdahl =

Icelandic writer (born 1978)

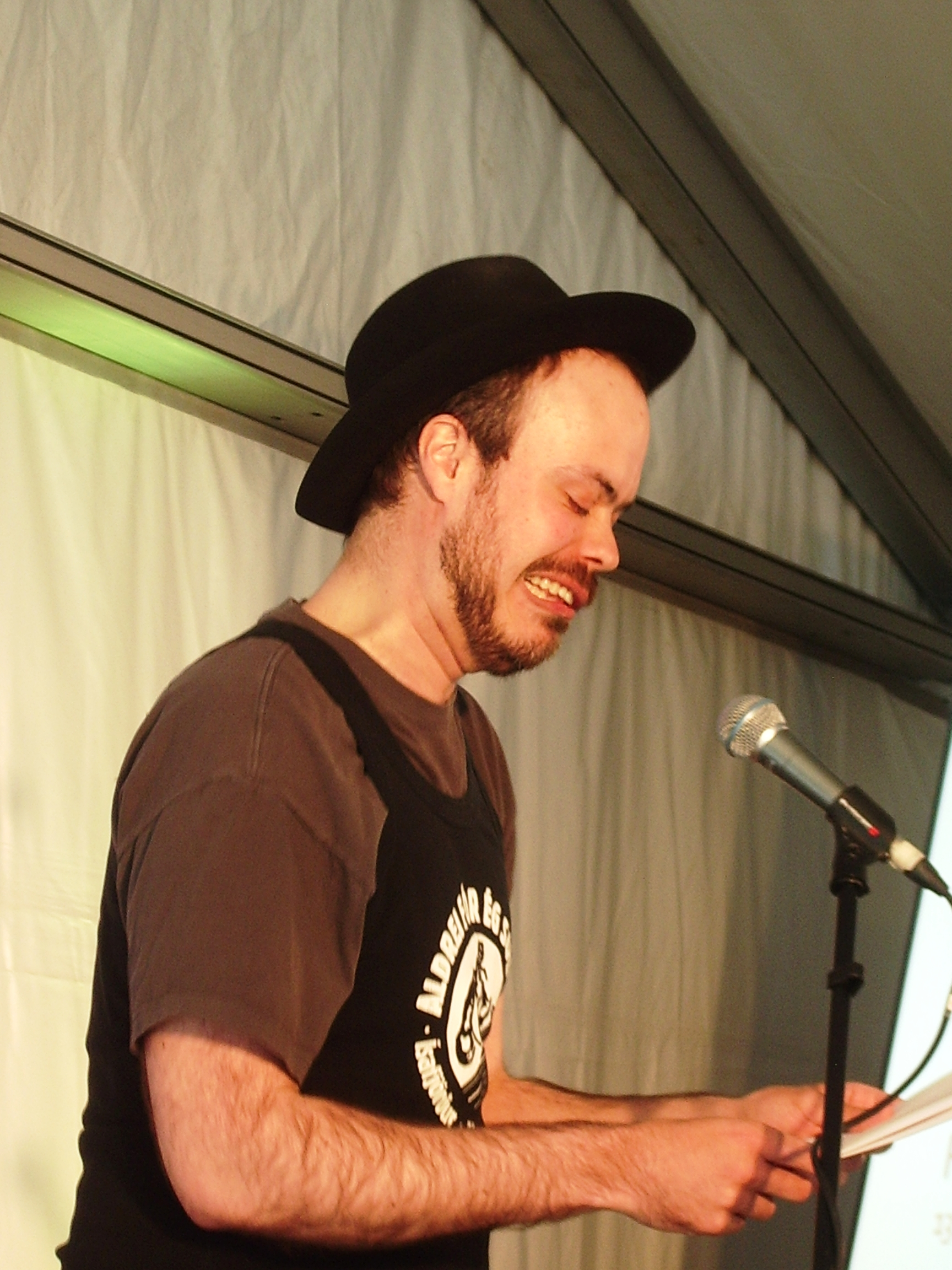
- Eiríkur Örn Norðdahl, 2009
- Born: 1 July 1978 (age 48); Reykjavík, Iceland
- Occupations: Writer; poet
- Notable work: Illska

Eiríkur Örn Norðdahl (born 1 July 1978) is an Icelandic writer. For a long time most noted as an experimental poet, in the 2010s he came to prominence as one of Iceland's foremost prose writers.

== Biography ==
Born in Reykjavík, Eiríkur Örn grew up in Ísafjörður. By Eiríkur's account he committed to a career as a writer around 2000, though he has necessarily often found an income through a wide range of other jobs, experiencing some periods of considerable hardship. He lived in Berlin from around 2002-4, and over the next ten years in various northern European countries, most prominently in Helsinki (c. 2006-9) and Oulu (c. 2009-11). In 2004 Eiríkur was a founder member of the Icelandic avant-garde poetry collective Nýhil, which organised poetry events and publishing; the co-operative continued until around 2010. He was a prominent contributor to The Reykjavík Grapevine in 2009-11.

Eiríkur Örn has married; his first child was born in 2009.

Eiríkur and his family members are in a band called Sjökvist, and they have made 3 songs that have all gained recognition.

== Awards ==
In 2008, Eiríkur Örn received the Icelandic Translators Award for his translation of Jonathan Lethem's tourettic novel, Motherless Brooklyn. His poetry-animation Höpöhöpö Böks received an Honorable Mention in 2010 at the Zebra Poetry Film Festival Berlin.

Eiríkur Örn won the 2012 Icelandic Literary Prize in the category of fiction and poetry and the 2012 Book Merchants' Prize for his novel Illska (lit. Evil).

== Writing ==
=== Poetry ===
Eiríkur Örn is best known internationally for his poetry, much of which is sound-poetry or multi-media, and which he performs widely. Much of it has been translated, into a variety of languages. His published collections are:

- Óratorrek: Ljóð um samfélagsleg málefni (Reykjavík: Mál og menning, 2017)
- Plokkfiskbókin (Reykjavík : Mál og menning, 2016)
- Hnefi eða vitstola orð, Mál & menning, 2013
- IWF! IWF! OMG! OMG!, a collection of poems translated into German by Jón Bjarni Atlason and Alexander Sitzmann
- Ú á fasismann - og fleiri ljóð, Mál & menning, 2008
- Þjónn, það er Fönix í öskubakkanum mínum, Nýhil, 2007
- Handsprengja í morgunsárið, with Ingólfi Gíslasyni, Nýhil, 2007
- Blandarabrandarar, Nýhil, 2005
- Nihil Obstat, Nýhil, 2003
- Heimsendapestir, Nýhil, 2002
- Heilagt stríð: runnið undan rifjum drykkjumanna, self-published, 2001

=== Novels ===
Eiríkur Örn is best known in Iceland for his novels, of which he has so far published six:

- Hans Blær, Mál og Menning, 2018
- Heimska, Mál og Menning, 2015
- Illska, Mál og Menning, 2012
- Gæska: Skáldsaga, Mál og Menning, 2009
- Eitur fyrir byrjendur, Nýhil, 2006 (in Swedish as Gift för nybörjare, trans. by Anna Gunnarsdotter Grönberg (Rasmus) and in German as Gift für Anfanger)
- Hugsjónadruslan, Mál og Menning, 2004

=== Translations ===
- Hvítsvíta by Athena Farrokhzad, Reykjavík : Mál og menning, 2016
- Erfðaskrá vélstúlkunnar by Ida Linde, Meðgönguljóð, 2014
- Friðlaus by Lee Child, 2010
- Spádómar Nostradamusar by Mario Reading, 2010
- Enron by Lucy Prebble, 2010
- Í frjálsu falli by Lee Child, 2009
- Maíkonungurinn - valin ljóð eftir Allen Ginsberg, Mál & menning, 2008
- Doktor Proktor og prumpuduftið by Jo Nesbø, Forlagið, 2008
- Súkkulaði by Joanne Harris, Uppheimar 2007
- 131.839 slög með bilum -ljóðaþýðingar, Ntamo, 2007
- Móðurlaus Brooklyn by Jonathan Lethem, Bjartur, 2007
- Heljarþröm by Anthony Horowitz, Forlagið, 2007
- Eminem - ævisaga by Anthony Bozza, Tindur, 2006
- Heimskir hvítir karlar by Michael Moore, Edda-Forlagið, 2003

=== Essays ===
- Booby, be Quiet!, Helsinki: Poesia, 2011
- Ást er þjófnaður, Perspired by Iceland/SLIS (Sumarbúðir LIsthneigðra Sósíalista), 2011

=== Editing ===
- Eiríkur Örn is an editor of the webzine Starafugl
- Af steypu, with Kári Páll Óskarsson, Nýhil, 2009
- Af ljóðum, Nýhil, 2005
