= Niels Nielsen (geographer) =

Portrait of Niels Nielsen.

Niels Nielsen (1893–1981) was a Danish geographer and professor of geology at Copenhagen University, particularly noted for his research on the volcanoes and glaciers of Iceland and the geomorphology of Jutland's West Coast and the Wadden Sea, in particular the Skallingen peninsula.

== Works ==
Nielsen's works include the following books:

- Contributions to the physiography of Iceland: with particular reference to the highlands west of Vatnajökull (København: Levin & Munksgaard, 1933)
- Vatnajökull: Kampen mellem ild og is (København: Hagerup, 1937)
