= Hlemmur (soundtrack) =

Soundtrack album by Sigur Rós
- Released: 20 August 2007
- Recorded: 2002
- Genre: Electronica
- Label: Krúnk

Sigur Rós chronology
Rímur (2000)	Hlemmur (2007)	untitled #1 (a.k.a. Vaka) (2003)

Alternative cover
- Cover of limited edition DVD/CD double pack

Professional ratings
Review scores
Source	Rating
Pitchfork Media	(6.1/10)

Hlemmur is a soundtrack from 2002, composed and performed by the Icelandic band Sigur Rós. It is an instrumental electronic score to the Icelandic documentary Hlemmur, which is named after Reykjavík's prior main bus terminal. It was originally made available to the general audience during the spring 2003 European and American tours. It's made up of 19 songs, some of which are variations on the same theme. The film and the soundtrack were released together in a limited-edition DVD-CD package in August 2007 on the band's own label, Krúnk.

== Track listing ==
1. "Jósef tekur fimmuna í vinnuna" [Jósef Takes the Nr. 5 to Work] - 3:04
2. "Hlemmur 1" - 1:38
3. "Fyrsta ferð" [The First Trip] - 2:35
4. "Vetur" [Winter] - 1:48
5. "Hvalir í útrýmingarhættu" [Endangered Whales] - 3:00
6. "Hlemmur 2" - 0:43
7. "Þversögn" [Paradox] - 2:09
8. "1970" - 1:14
9. "Jósef tekur fimmuna í vinnuna 2" - 1:47
10. "Ég mun læknast!" [I Will Recover!] - 1:54
11. "1993" - 1:12
12. "Hlemmur 3" - 1:19
13. "Síðasta ferð" [The Last Trip] - 2:38
14. "23:20" - 1:42
15. "Byrgið" [The Shelter] - 1:36
16. "Áfram Ísland" [Go Iceland] - 1:22
17. "Allt tekur sinn tíma!" [All in Due Time!] - 2:46
18. "Hannes" [a male name] - 2:39
19. "Óskabörn þjóðarinnar" [Model Citizens] - 4:45
