= JPV =

Icelandic publishing house

JVP logo from a 2012 publication

JPV was an Icelandic publishing house, established in 2001 by Jóhann Páll Valdimarsson, from whose initials the press takes its name. On 1 October 2007, JPV merged with the publishers Mál og menning, Vaka-Helgafell and Bókaútgáfan Iðunn under the name Forlagið. However, books continue to be published under the JPV imprint.
