= Forlagið =

Icelandic publishing house

Forlagið (Icelandic pronunciation: [ˈfɔrˌlaijɪð], meaning "The Publishing House") is the largest publishing house in Iceland. It publishes around 150 titles a year under five different imprints: JPV, Mál og menning, Vaka-Helgafell, Iðunn, and Ókeibækur. It is also publishes maps.

The company was created in 2007 when Mál og menning bought the publishing arm of Edda and merged with JPV. In 2008 it merged with Vegamót. Mál og menning is a controlling shareholder of Forlagið. At the time of its creation, it was ten times larger than the second largest Icelandic publishing house. In 2017, it had a 50% share of the general publishing market in Iceland, and was four times larger than the second largest, Bjartur-Veröld.

Annual net profits are around 50 million ISK (410,000 USD in 2016).

In 2020, the Swedish audiobook service Storytel had agreed to buy 70% of the company. But that same year, they withdrew their merger application due to competition concerns in Iceland; instead, both companies established a commercial distribution alliance to bring Forlagið's catalog to Storytel's digital platform.
