= Hlemmur =

Bus station in Reykjavík, Iceland

Coordinates: 64°08′35.60″N 21°54′51″W

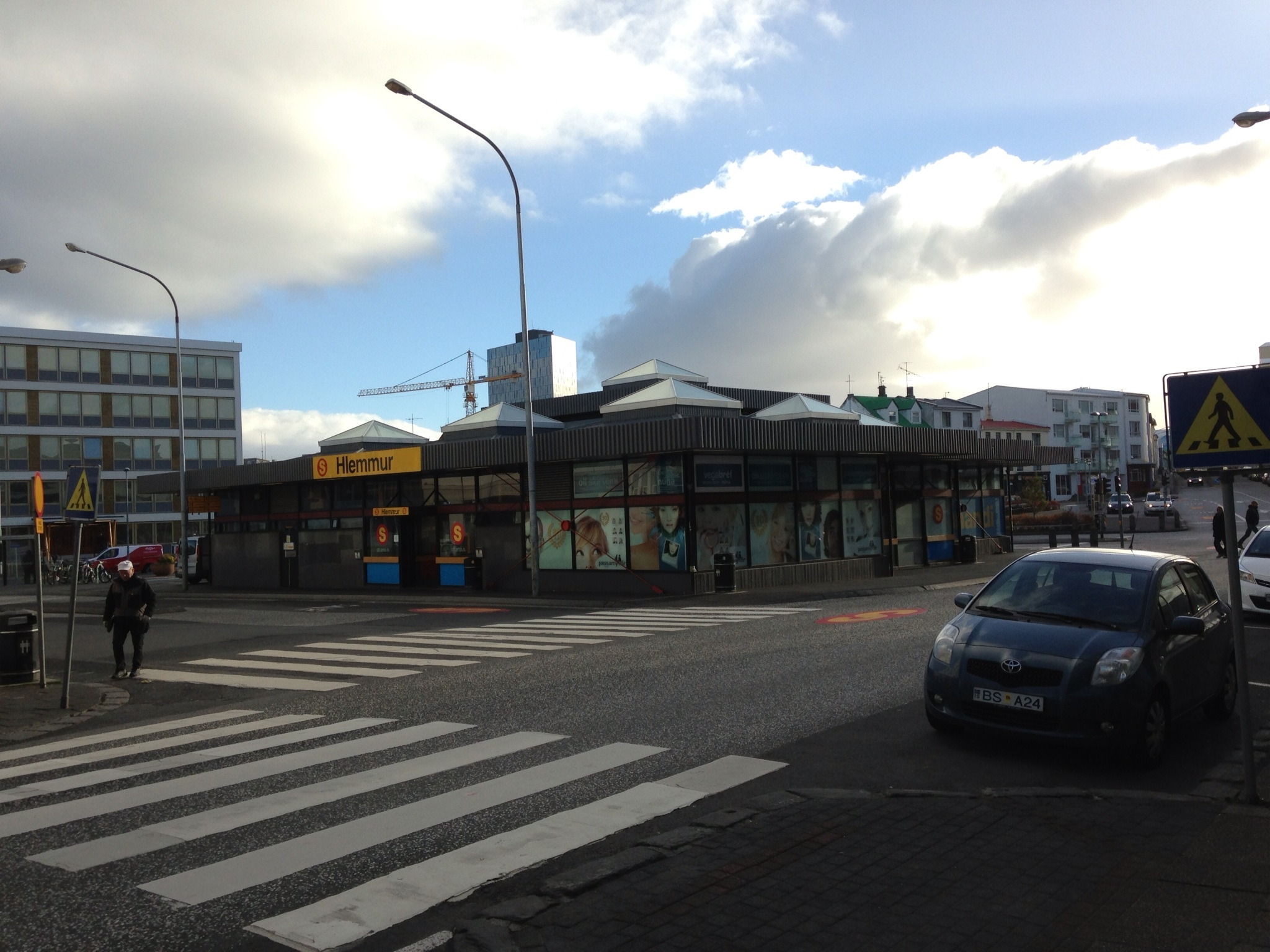

General information
- Location: Reykjavík; Iceland
- Owner: Reykjavík City
- Operator: Strætó bs

Construction
- Structure type: At-grade
Location

Hlemmur (Icelandic pronunciation: [ˈl̥ɛmmʏr̥]) is a town square in Reykjavík, Iceland. It is located in the eastern part of the central Reykjavík. As of 2024, it is currently being reconstructed as a bus rapid transit interchange for the Borgarlina project.

In future, Hlemmur will become a transport interchange and hub in the Borgarlína project. In the meanwhile, buses have been rerouted around Hlemmur during construction as of December 2024.

== History ==
In the later parts of 1800s a little bridge was made over Rauðará called Hlemmur meaning shutter or trapdoor. The bridge is long gone and the river flows today underground but the name has continued.

The bus terminal building was constructed in 1978 as the major bus terminal and interchange in eastern central Reykjavík.

Since its opening, Hlemmur was a major bus interchange for Strætó bs city bus services in central Reykjavík, Iceland. The other main interchange in the city centre is Lækjartorg. Bus routes 1, 2, 3, 4, 5, 6, 11, 12, 13, 14, 15, 16, 17 and 18 stopped at Hlemmur as well as night bus routes 103, 104, 105.

In 2017 the Hlemmur bus terminal building was converted into a food court, however the adjacent bus terminal platforms were in use until 2024, when major road reconstruction for a BRT Borgarlína station began.

The 2002 documentary Hlemmur tells the story of homeless people who spent their time in and around the bus station.
