= Strætó =

Public bus transport company in Iceland

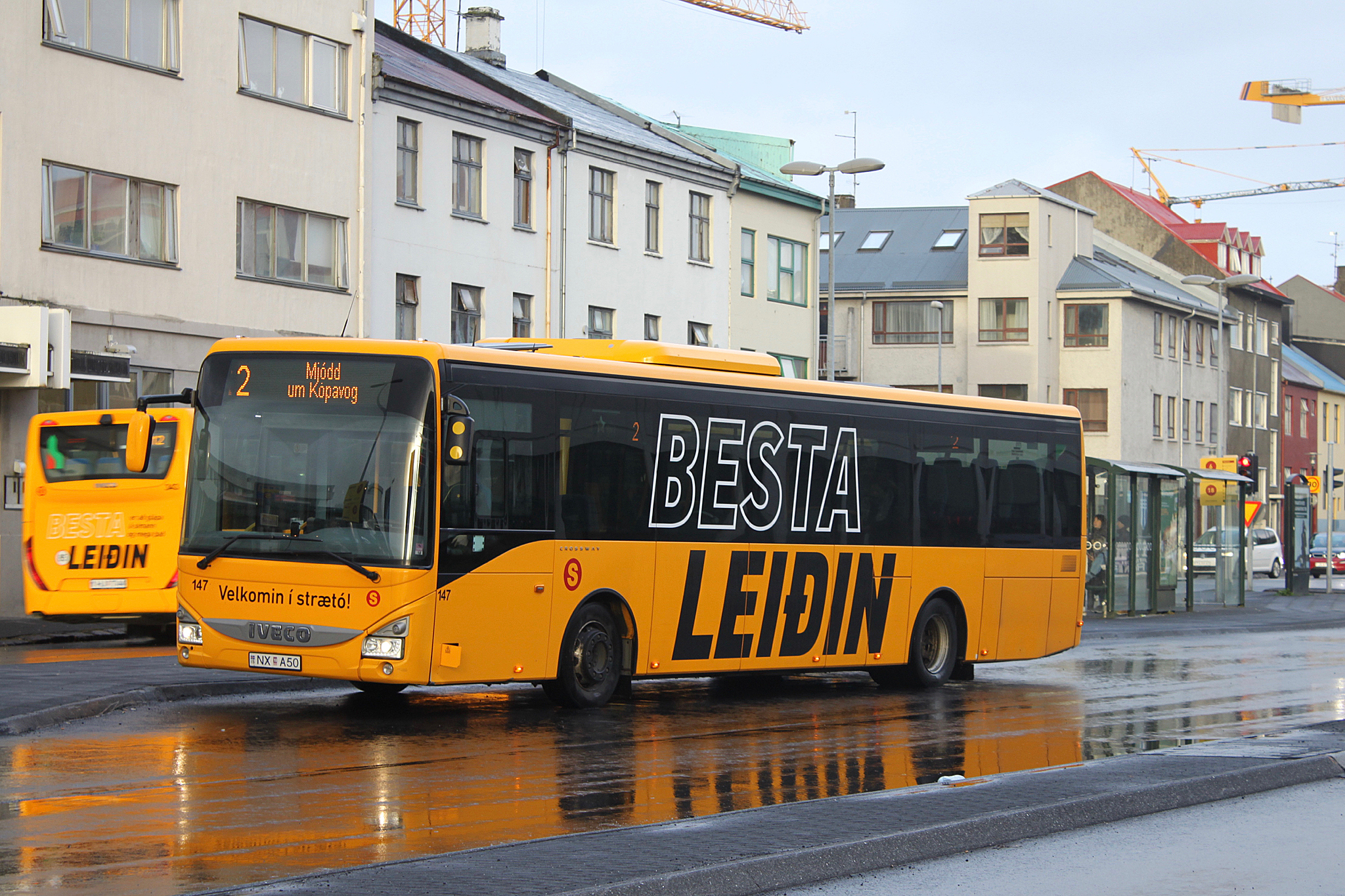
- A Strætó city bus in Reykjavík
- Founded: August 1931 (as Strætisvagnar Reykjavíkur hf.); 1 July 2001 (as Strætó bs.)
- Headquarters: Hestháls 14, 110 Reykjavík, Iceland
- Service area: Iceland
- Service type: Bus transport network
- Routes: 29 city routes 27 rural routes
- Fleet: 160
- Daily ridership: 33,378 (2019)
- Annual ridership: 12,183,000 (2019)
- Fuel type: Diesel, Electric, natural gas
- Chief executive: Jóhannes Svavar Rúnarsson
- Website: straeto.is (in Icelandic), straeto.is/en (in English)

Strætó (Icelandic pronunciation: [ˈstraiːtou]) is a public transport company which operates city buses in the Icelandic capital region, including Reykjavík and its surrounding towns. Strætó also manages rural coach services for most of the country in co-operation with the Icelandic Road Administration.

Strætó was created in its current form in 2001 through the merger of pre-existing regional bus companies, tracing its roots to the year 1931. It is owned by the six municipalities in the Capital Region: Reykjavík, Kópavogur, Hafnarfjörður, Garðabær, Mosfellsbær and Seltjarnarnes. They are known in the city by their distinctive yellow colour. In March 2023, there were 1.2 million journeys in the capital area per month, coming to around 40,000 per day.

== Bus network ==
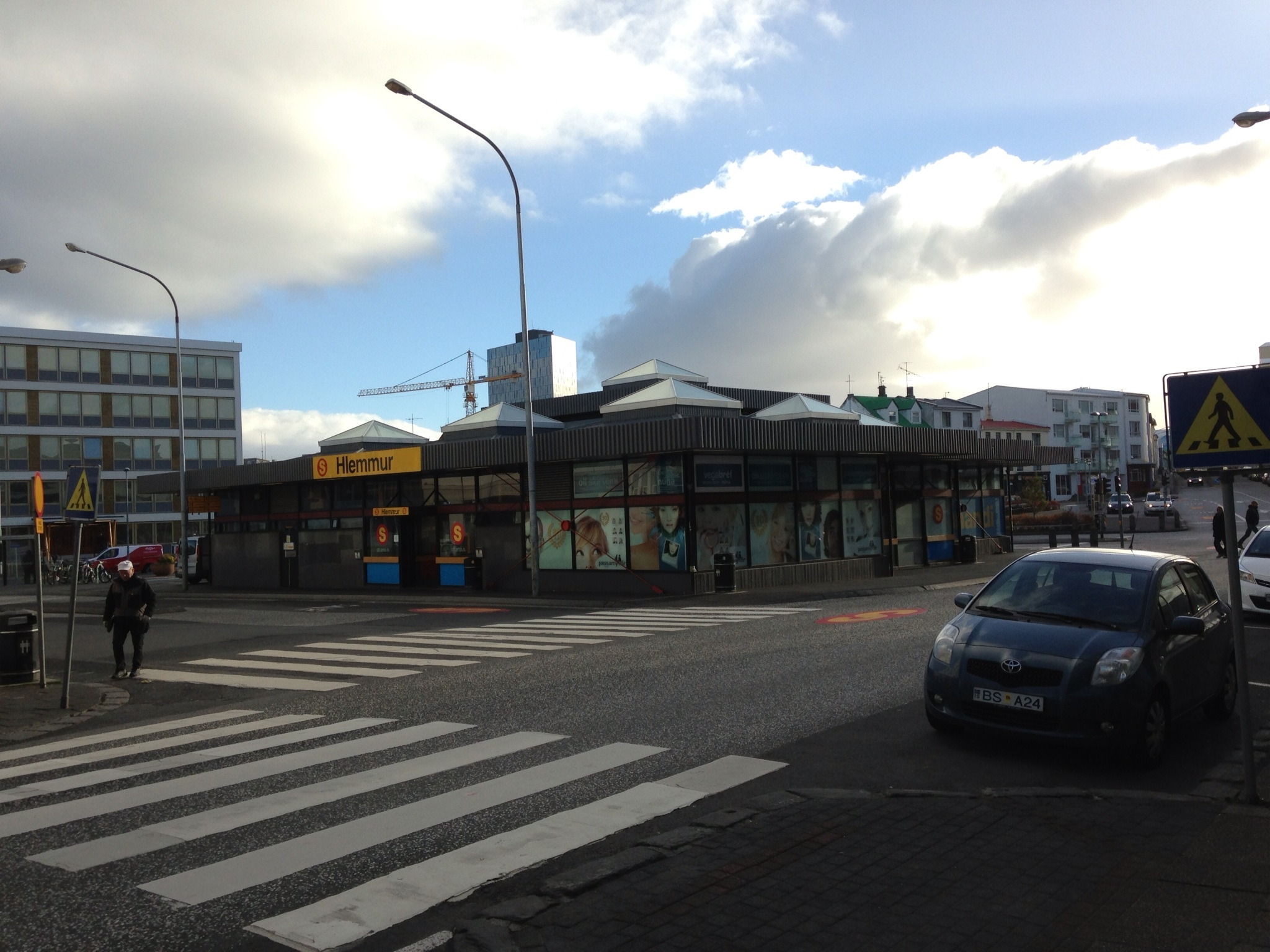
Hlemmur Terminal

Timetable of line 51

BSI Terminal

As of 2023, 29 city routes and 27 rural routes are operated. The company has a fleet of 74 city buses, of which 28 are battery electric buses and 4 CNG buses. The fleet is supplemented by around 86 diesel buses leased and operated by private bus companies, composing of around 50% of its total operations. Strætó aims to operate only zero emissions buses by 2030. All buses are fitted with real time passenger information systems. Most larger bus stops also have real time departure boards.

Most bus routes run at about 15-minute intervals during peak hours on weekdays and at 30-minute intervals during off-peak hours and at weekends. Some busier bus routes are run at increased frequencies, while others require passengers to call ahead of boarding to request a bus.

Major bus interchanges in the Capital Region are: Lækjartorg in downtown Reykjavík; Hamraborg in Kópavogur, Fjörður in Hafnarfjörður, Ásgarður in Garðabær, Ártún, Mjódd, Spöngin and Háholt.

=== Night bus ===
As of 2022, there are five night bus routes operated in the Reykjavík capital region on Friday and Saturday nights. Night buses only operate in one direction: from the city centre to the suburbs on an approximately hourly basis. For special events such as the city Culture Night, extra services have been provided during the night. The routes are numbered 101, 103, 104, 105 and 106. The cost is the same as a normal adult day fare.

=== Long distance routes ===
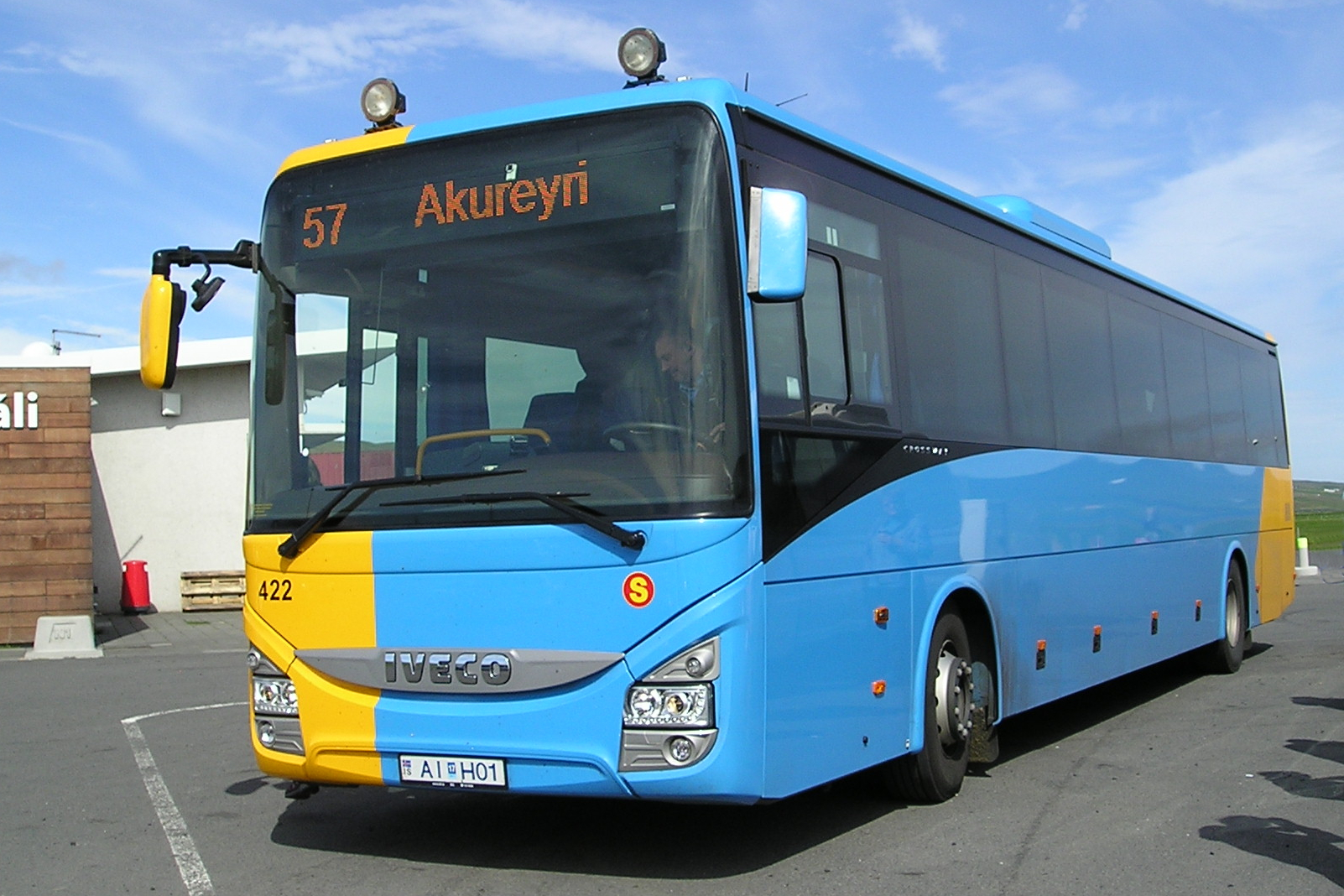
Long-distance bus route operated by Strætó.

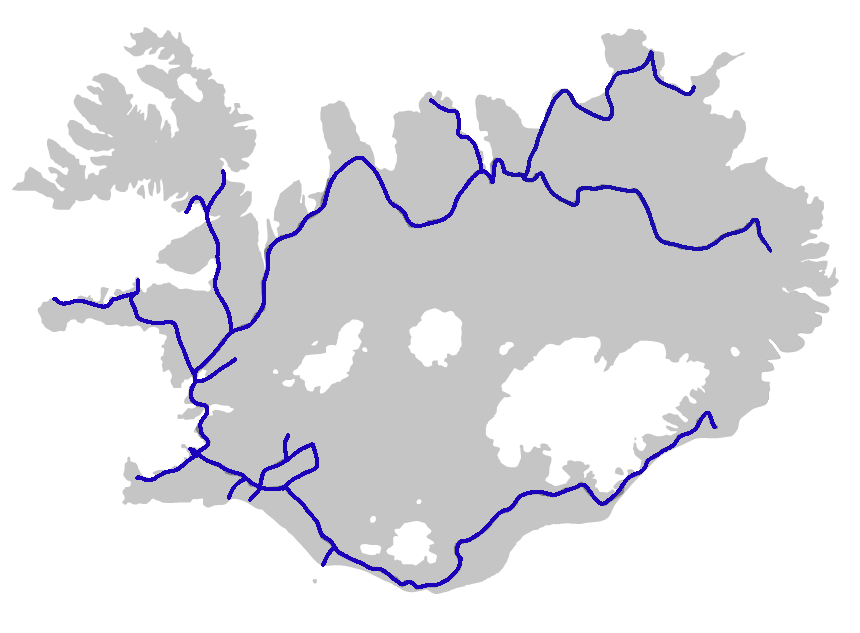
Map of the long distance routes

Bus routes numbered from 50 to 100 are long-distance routes that run to locations all around Iceland. Some very rural routes are request routes and one must call ahead for the service to operate. Long-distance services operated by Strætó from Reykjavík generally depart from the Mjódd bus terminal in the outskirts.

== Tickets and fares ==
=== City fares ===
There is a standard flat fare for a single ticket within the capital region of Reykjavík, allowing unlimited transfers for 75 minutes from activation. The single adult fare as of autumn 2024 is ISK 650 for adults. Cash is not accepted on city buses.

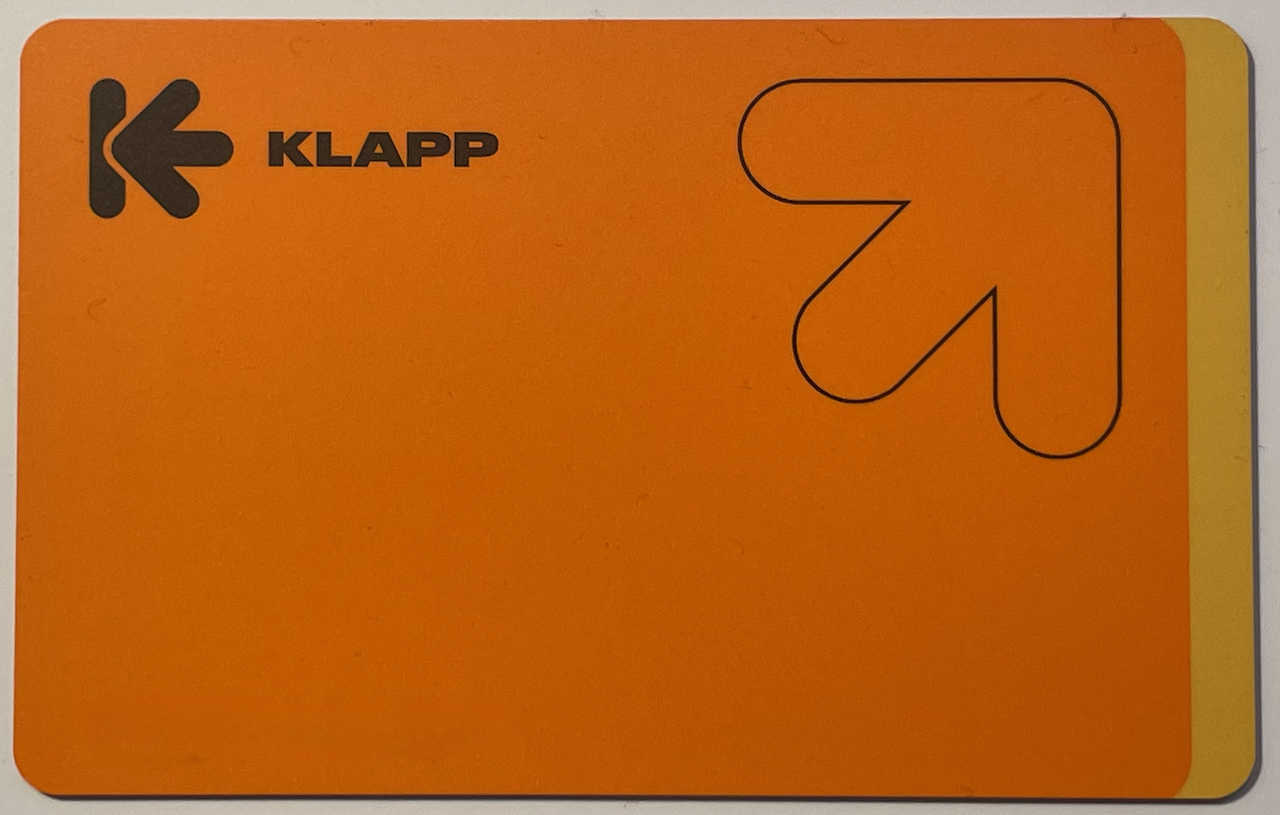
Klapp reusable smartcard

Fare payment is based on the Klapp system. Payment can be made by contactless debit and credit card. For regular users, reusable Klapp smartcards can be purchased and all types of tickets can be loaded onto the card. The Klapp app (iOS and Android) has the same functionality using barcodes. Fare-capping, called Kapp, limits single adult fare payers to three payments per day and nine per week, if using the same payment medium.

The table below explains the availability of each type of fare type:

Fare type	Single adult fare	Group tickets	Carnet (10 journeys)	Concessionary fares/passes
Contactless debit/credit card	Yes			
Klapp app (iOS and Android)	Yes	Yes		Yes
Klapp reusable smartcard	Yes	Yes		Yes
Klapp single-use paper tickets			Yes	

Disposable paper barcode tickets available as a carnet of 10 single tickets are available from participating resellers. There is no discount offered on individual journeys on the carnet, nor are there discounts on group tickets purchased in the Klapp system.

Monthly and annual passes are also available through the Klapp system.

==== Contactless payment ====
Payment by contactless debit and credit card with Visa and Mastercard is supported, including mobile solutions such as Apple Pay or Google Pay - a single adult fare is always charged when using a contactless payment card. Kapp daily and weekly fare-capping also applies to contactless card payments. Bus transfers are possible by using the same payment card on the reader for 75 minutes.

Only a full single adult fare payment is possible with credit and debit cards. Group tickets must be purchased through separate payment cards or through the Klapp system.

==== Concessionary fares ====
Concessionary fares with discounts of 50% are available for children, senior citizens and 70% for disabled people. Children under 11 travel free. Season tickets are available with the same concessions as single tickets, as well as a 50% student concession. Concessionary fares are only available using the Klapp system, not using contactless payment cards.

=== Long distance fares ===
Long distance fares are defined by a zone system based on distance travelled. Tickets are purchased on board and paid directly to the driver in cash or by credit/debit card. Concessionary single fares are half price for children, senior and disabled people. Children under the age of 11 travel for free. There are no reservations and one cannot purchase tickets ahead of time.

Season tickets for long-distance journeys can be purchased for a specific region for a period of 1, 3 or 12 months and are issued as a separate card, with concessionary fares available.

It is envisioned that long distance ticketing will be migrated to the new Klapp payment system.

== History and network development ==
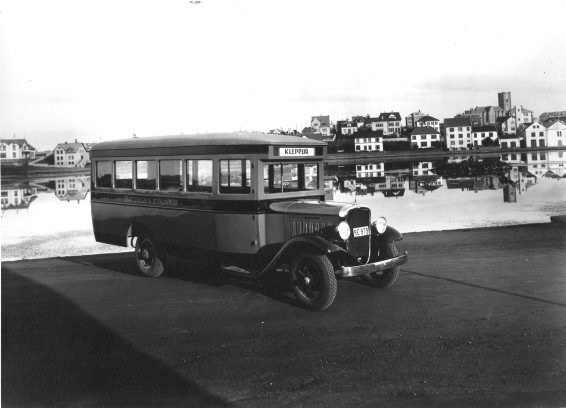
SVR bus in Reykjavík in 1933.

The first bus services in Reykjavík were established in 1931 under Strætisvagnar Reykjavíkur (SVR). Until the 21st century, SVR operated in Reykjavík and nearby satellites in the northern part of the Capital Region, while a separately operated Almenningsvagnar (AV) covered the southern part of the capital region. Strætó, in its current form, was created on 1 July 2001 by merging SVR and AV to create a unified bus service in the capital region of Reykjavík.

=== Route changes ===
Under new management, planning for the revised network began in 2001. On 23 July 2005, a new route network was instituted to replace the previous network, which had been practically unchanged for decades. Previously, new routes had been added in new developing areas, but the core routes were largely unchanged since the 20th century. The greatest change was the introduction of the 'trunk routes' and their increased frequency during peak hours. A colour coded scheme was introduced as well as a new numbering system to differentiate trunk and local routes.

In the new 2005 bus network, they were split into different categories. Eight of the routes were trunk routes (routes 1–8) that run between the city centre and the various residential neighbourhoods on the city's outskirts; these use the main traffic arteries and are thus the fastest routes available. Nine of the routes were general routes (routes 11–19) that also route through the city centre but go deeper into the different neighbourhoods on slower streets. The remaining routes were designated neighbourhood routes (routes 21–36) that run within or between the suburbs and do not stop in downtown Reykjavík. This route network is mostly unchanged as of 2024, but the designations are no longer strictly relevant.

The introduction of the new network caused some controversy as people (especially senior citizens, who make up a large percentage of users) had been accustomed to the old routes. Additionally, some smaller neighbourhoods were entirely cut out of the new routes, resulting in longer walks to the nearest bus station. On 5 March 2006, some refinements were made to the network in response to comments from users and drivers after the 2005 revision. The greatest change was the addition of three routes to better cover some neighbourhoods and increased links between suburban centres. In 2010, there were further route changes.

In early 2012, long-distance bus services in rural Iceland, previously operated locally by municipalities, were absorbed into the Strætó network under the management of the Icelandic Road Administration. Subsequently, routes were integrated into the national fare and bus numbering system, as well as being marketed under the Strætó brand.

=== Recent history ===
Night buses on weekends were introduced in autumn 1994 under SVR, but ceased in 2003.

In 2007, Strætó moved its depot from Kirkjusandur to their current location in Hestháls.

As part of a ECTOS Hydrogen demonstration project in cooperation with Icelandic New Energy and partly funded by the EU, three hydrogen fuel-cell buses were in use from October 2003 until 2008.

In 2006, the first two CNG buses began operating for Strætó using methane biogas produced from local waste. In 2018, the first battery-electric buses were introduced into the fleet. As of 2024, there are 28 are battery-electric buses and 4 CNG buses in operation, comprising around 18% of the fleet total.

In 2012, GPS tracking was introduced to the bus fleet, accompanied by on-board stop displays and audible stop announcements. This also allowed users able to track buses on the Strætó website as well as through a new mobile app, which also provided trip planning. The app later added the ability to pay for bus fares using the app in 2014. From 2014 to 2025, Strætó provided free Wi-fi on all city buses. In 2018, bus routes, stops and timetables were made available as a public API in the form of a GTFS feed, allowing Google Maps and Apple Maps to display bus information in their apps. This was expanded in 2024 with live bus times, showing users delays and real-time information. In 2020, the most frequented bus stops received real-time LED departure boards.

In 2021, consultation and planning began for a major reorganisation of the bus route network in conjunction with the construction of a bus rapid transit system in the Reykjavík Capital region, called Borgarlína.

As a result of urban redevelopment and Borgarlína construction, the main city centre terminal at Hlemmur was closed in 2024 and partly relocated to a temporary facility at Skúlagötu. After reconstruction, Hlemmur will become an interchange for Borgarlina BRT services.

==== Klapp payment system ====
In November 2021, the Klapp open-loop account based electronic fare payment system, using contactless smartcards and a mobile app was introduced. This replaced a paper based ticketing system in use since the 20th century and outdated app fare payment function from 2014. The introduction of the system was met with controversy due to its difficulty in registering concessionary fare eligibility and its particularly poor reliability, with frequent outages requiring bus drivers to let passengers on without paying.

In September 2024 fare-capping was introduced on the Klapp system, followed by payment by contactless payment cards (Visa/Mastercard) in December. In June 2025, Strætó stopped accepting cash for city bus fares. Also in 2025, Strætó began to discontinue 1- and 3-day passes, previously issued on single use Klapp barcode cards.

==== Night bus launch ====
The first regular night bus service in Reykjavík started in January 2018 on a year-long trial basis. The service consisted of six routes (101, 102, 103, 105, 106, and 111) which started at the central bus station Hlemmur running out to the suburbs. Route 111 was discontinued in January 2019 due to low usage. In April 2020, all night buses in Reykjavík were suspended until further notice as a result of the COVID-19 pandemic.

In July 2022, Strætó resumed night bus service, adding two new routes that had not existed before services were paused in March 2020. The previous routes of the 101, 102, 103, 105 and 106 were reinstated, as well as two new routes numbered 104 and 107. The new 107 route follows much the same route as the discontinued route 111.

==== Borgrlina ====
Borgrlina is a BRT system in Reykjavik and the surrounding area, which is under construction since 2025. Former planings focused a lightrail system, which is postponed, but the final goal. Since August 2026 major roadway expansions expanded to Nauthólsvegur and Reykjavík University. For mid of 2028, the Fossvogur Bridge, a central piece of infrastructure linking Reykjavík to Kópavogur, is expected to be completed. The full completion of Phase one, which stretches 14.5 km from Hamraborg to Krossmýrartorg, is expected for the year of 2031 and for 2040 the overall target completion window for all six planned phases across the capital region should be completed.
