= Laugavegur (Reykjavík) =

Street in downtown Reykjavík, Iceland

Coordinates: 64°08′43.10″N 21°55′37.92″W

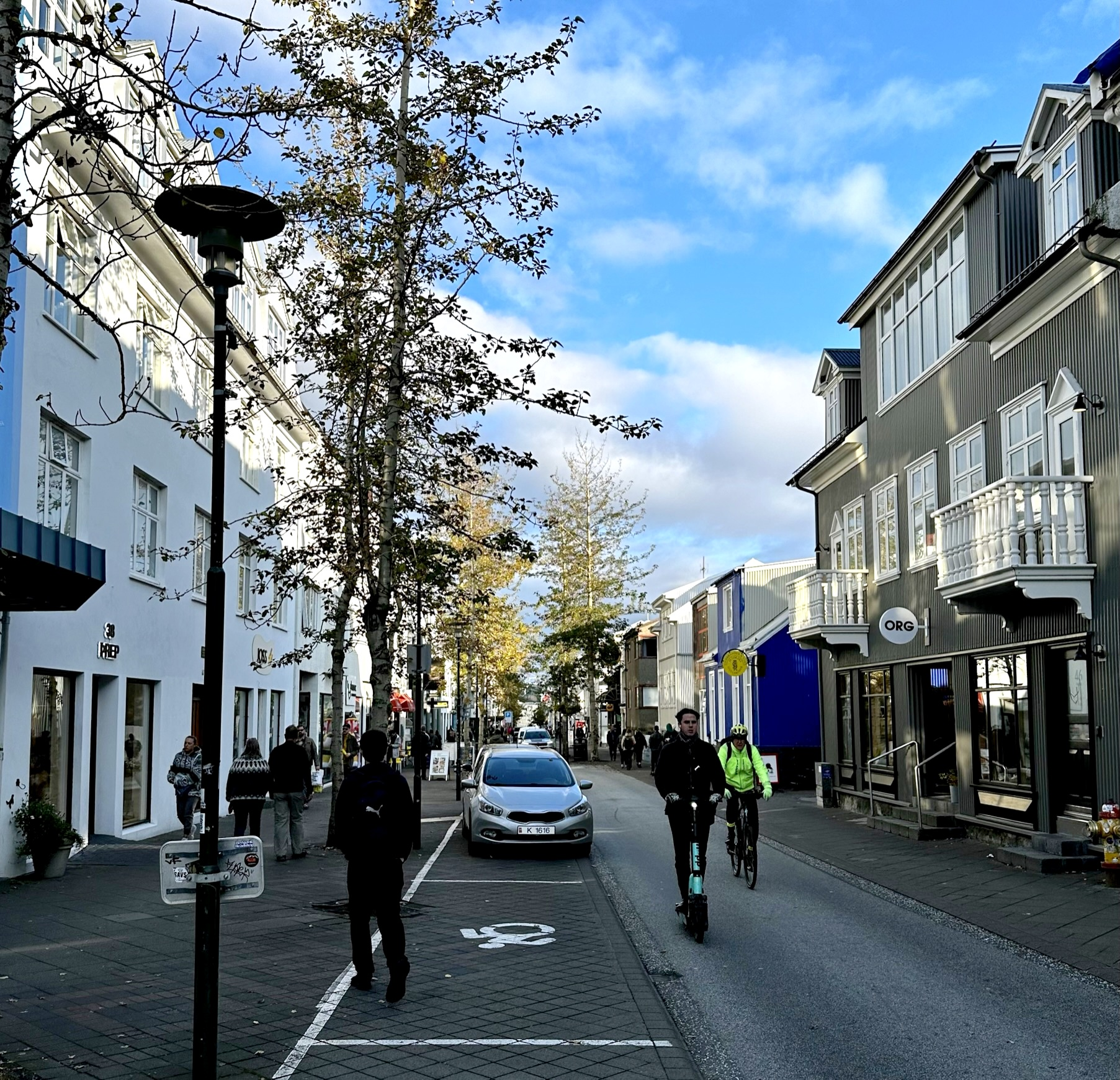
Laugavegur in 2023

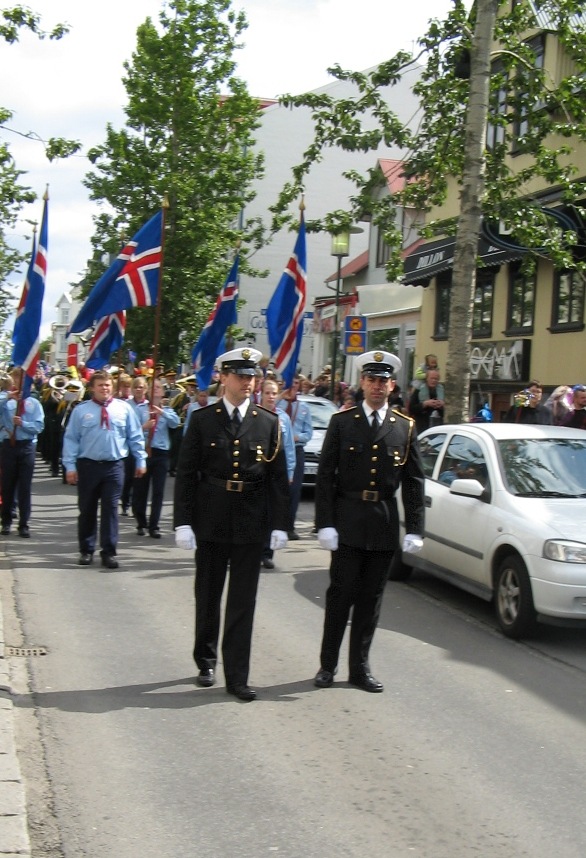
A parade on 17 June 2007 on Laugavegur

Laugavegur (Icelandic pronunciation: [ˈlœyːɣaˌvɛːɣʏr̥]) is the primary commercial artery of downtown Reykjavík, Iceland and one of the oldest shopping streets. The name means "wash road", as it used to lead to the hot springs in Laugardalur where in olden times the women of Reykjavík took their laundry for washing.

It was constructed in 1885 as a result of town council's decision. It experienced economic setbacks mostly because shopping malls opened elsewhere, most notably Kringlan that opened in 1987 and Smáralind that opened in 2001. It maintains the charm of a historical shopping street and is still home to the more exclusive stores in Iceland.

It is also home to many bars, nightclubs and restaurants. On Friday and Saturday nights, the street is often filled with people all night long.

== See also ==
- Borgartún: the main financial street in Reykjavík.
