= Mál og menning =

Icelandic publishing house

Logo, from the flyleaf of a 2018 book.

Mál og menning (Icelandic pronunciation: [ˈmauːl ɔːɣ ˈmɛnːiŋk], lit. 'Language and Culture') is an Icelandic publishing house, established in 1937. The press has published the work of many of Iceland's best known authors, among them Þórbergur Þórðarson, Jóhannes úr Kötlum, Svava Jakobsdóttir, Þórarinn Eldjárn, and Einar Kárason.

As of 2007 its books are published by the publishing house Forlagið, of which Mál og menning is a controlling shareholder.

== Origins ==
The publishing company Mál og menning was established on 17 June 1937, combining the press Heimskringla, which Kristinn E. Andrésson had founded in 1934, Ragnar í Smára's company Smári og fleirum, and the Félag byltingarsinnaðra rithöfunda (the Society of Revolutionary Authors, which included amongst others Kristinn E. Andrésson himself, Halldór Laxness, Steinn Steinarr, Jóhannes úr Kötlum and Halldór Stefánsson).

Mál og menning was originally a book club, to which people paid a subscription in order to receive books in the post. The first seven years saw the number of subscribers growing beyond 6,000. But the company soon began publishing its own books, with the objective of making good quality literature available at a low price. The first books it published were Vatnajökull by Niels Nielsen and the third volume of the journal Rauðir pennar, which the Félag byltingarsinnaðra rithöfunda had been publishing since 1935. Its first novel, published in 1938, was Móðirin by Maxim Gorky. In the early years, both translated and Icelandic works were published, but relatively few of these books were by contemporary writers.

In 1944 Kristinn Andrésson sold Heimskringla to Mál og menning, but Ragnar established the new press Helgafell. Halldór Laxness and Þórbergur Þórðarson followed Ragnar, though Halldór continued to sit on the board of Mál og menning.

== Post-war period ==
Kristinn E. Andrésson served as the chairman of Mál og menning from its founding to 1971, and was influential on the press throughout that period. He was succeeded by Sigfús Daðason, who led the company until 1973, when he became editorial director and Þröstur Ólafsson became the chairman. Þorleifur Hauksson was editorial director 1976–1982, succeeded by Þuríður Baxter. In 1980, Þröstur was succeeded as chairman by Ólafur Ólafsson and Ólöf Eldjárn. 1984 saw a new generation taking over, with Halldór Guðmundsson becoming editorial director and Árni Einarsson the chairman. The two saw Mál og menning becoming Iceland's biggest publisher.

The company was long associated with Icelandic socialism and was thought to have been subsidised by the Soviet Union during the Cold War. from 1970 the press was based in a building at Laugavegur 18, in a building that was often nicknamed 'Rúblan' ('the rouble').

== The twenty-first century ==
On 30 June 2000, the press Mál og menning merged with Vaka-Helgafell to create Edda - miðlun og útgáfa. The new company moved into a large building on Suðurlandsbraut. The books continued, however, to be published under the separate imprints Mál og menning and Vaka-Helgafell. In 2002, as Edda faced difficulties, Björgólfur Guðmundsson and others bought into the company, gaining significant influence.

In 2007 the publishing arm of Edda was sold back to the holding company of Mál and menning, and on 1 October 2007 Mál og menning, Vaka-Helgafell, JPV, and the press Iðunn, which Edda had bought some years before, merged under the name Forlagið. Books continued to be published under the imprints of Mál og menning and the other companies. The current editorial director of Mál og menning is Silja Aðalsteinsdóttir.

== Journal: Tímarit Máls og menningar ==
In 1938, the press also established a journal, Tímarit Máls og menningar. The current editor is Guðmundur Andri Thorsson.

== Bookshops ==
In 1940, the company also established a bookshop, Bókabúð Máls og menningar, on Reykjavík's main street, Laugavegur. It swiftly became one of Iceland's main bookshops. Later a number of branches of the shop were also founded, the biggest being at Síðumúli.

The bookshop remained in possession of the publishing house until 2003, when the shops were sold to Pennan/Eymundsson. The iconic Laugavegur branch retained the name Bókabúð Máls og menningar until summer 2009, when it moved to Skólavörðustígur. Soon after, however, a new bookshop opened at Laugavegur 18 under the name Bókabúð Máls og menningar. This establishment is, however, unconnected with the publishing house.

== Sources ==
- 'Erum ekki erfingjar kalda stríðsins'. Lesbók Morgunblaðsins, 14 June 1997.
- 'Mál og Menning og JPV sameinast (af vef Rúv)'. 25 November 2007.
- 'Fædd og uppalin í Máli og menningu'
- 'Nýfundin skjöl Sovéska kommúnistaflokksins í Moskvu: Mál og menning fékk styrki'
